= 1996 Ontario Liberal Party leadership election =

Canadian provincial party election

- Date: December 1, 1996
- Convention: Maple Leaf Gardens, Toronto
- Resigning leader: Lyn McLeod
- Won by: Dalton McGuinty
- Ballots: 5
- Candidates: 7

The 1996 Ontario Liberal Party leadership convention, held between November 29 and December 1, 1996 at the Maple Leaf Gardens in Toronto, elected Dalton McGuinty as the new leader of the Ontario Liberal Party, replacing Lyn McLeod, who announced her resignation following the 1995 Ontario provincial election.

The contest featured seven official candidates: MPPs Anna-Marie Castrilli, Joseph Cordiano, Dwight Duncan, John Gerretsen, Gerrard Kennedy, and Dalton McGuinty, and businessman Greg Kells. McGuinty lost the subsequent 1999 provincial election but won in 2003 and served as Premier for almost ten years until 2013.

== Background ==
Lyn McLeod, a cabinet minister in the government of Premier David Peterson, was elected leader of the party in 1992 following the defeat of the Peterson government in 1990. She defeated frontrunner Murray Elston by nine votes on the fifth ballot, becoming the first woman to lead a major party in Ontario.

The party under McLeod had been leading in the polls for most of the period from 1992 to 1995, and were generally favoured to benefit from the swing in support away from the NDP. However, the party hurt its credibility through a series of high-profile policy reversals in the period leading up to the election, the most notable being her stance on rights for same-sex couples. Following her disappointing showing in the 1995 provincial election, McLeod announced in September 1995 she would step down as soon as a replacement is selected.

== Early Campaign ==
Former cabinet ministers Sean Conway, Murray Elston and Gerry Phillips were initially the leading contenders for the leadership. At a preliminary planning meeting hosted by the party in January 1996, prospective candidates sent representatives, including the four of the six MPPs eventually entered the race (excluding Duncan who was supporting Conway at the time, and Kennedy who was not an MPP at the time); MPPs Conway, Phillips, Dominic Agostino, Richard Patten; federal environment minister Sergio Marchi, Toronto lawyer John Campion; and Robert McMurtry, brother of former Progressive Conservative Attorney General Roy McMurtry.

Conway publicly declared his intention to run in the summer of 1995, and was widely perceived to have accumulated enough support within the caucus and the wider party to secure victory, but announced in late January 1996 that he would not be a candidate. Phillips announced his bid in late March after Conway's exit, quickly emerging as the frontrunner and garnering support from half of the caucus, but withdraw in April due to a heart ailment.

Duncan became the first caucus member to formally announce a bid in June, followed shortly by Kennedy in mid July. McGuinty, Cordiano, Castrilli and Gerretsen all officially entered the race in late August. Each candidate were required to pay a $50,000 non-refundable deposit.

== Candidates ==
=== Anna-Marie Castrilli ===
Anna-Marie Castrilli, 47 a lawyer, was elected MPP for Downsview in 1995. A former chair of the Governing Council of the University of Toronto, she served as the party's colleges and universities critic.

- Other prominent supporters: Federal Ministers Jane Stewart (MP for Brant) and Art Eggleton (MP for York Centre)

=== Joseph Cordiano ===
Joseph Cordiano, 39, was first elected MPP in 1985 for Downsview, and served as MPP for Lawrence since 1987. He served as a Parliamentary Assistant to several ministers during the Peterson government, and was the only candidate that has served in government. In opposition he was a prominent voice for the party within Toronto. At the start of the campaign, he was seen as the leading right-of-centre challenger to frontrunner Kennedy.

- Supporters in Caucus (4): Elinor Caplan (Oriole), John Cleary (Cornwall), Alvin Curling (Scarborough North), Mario Sergio (Yorkview)
- Other prominent supporters: Tony Ianno (MP for Trinity—Spadina, cousin of Cordiano and served as campaign chair)

=== Dwight Duncan ===
Dwight Duncan, 37, was MPP Windsor—Walkerville since 1995. Duncan was an aide to prominent Windsor political figures like federal minister Herb Gray and provincial minister Bill Wrye, and served on Windsor City Council from 1988 until 1994. He campaigned on a cautious fiscal strategy but with plans for increased investment in health and education. Confidence with his chances, his campaign allowed a CPAC camera crew to shadow him throughout the convention, capturing a number of less-than-flattering moments for Duncan.

- Supporters in Caucus (9): Rick Bartolucci (Sudbury), Michael Brown (Algoma-Manitoulin), Mike Colle (Oakwood), Sean Conway (Renfrew North), Bruce Crozier (Essex South), Pat Hoy (Essex-Kent), Frank Miclash (Kenora), Sandra Pupatello (Windsor-Sandwich), David Ramsay (Timiskaming)
- Other prominent supporters: Federal Minister Herb Gray (MP for Windsor West); former MPP Tim Murphy

=== John Gerretsen ===
John Gerretsen, 54, was a lawyer who was elected MPP for Kingston and the Islands in 1995. He served as a Kingston Alderman/Councillor between 1972 and 1980, and served as Mayor between 1980 and 1988. He was also President of the Association of Municipalities of Ontario from 1986 to 1987.

=== Greg Kells ===
Greg Kells was an Ottawa area businessman, and the only candidate who was not in caucus.

=== Gerrard Kennedy ===
Gerrard Kennedy, 36, only entered the legislature at the end of May, when he won the by-election to replace former Premier Bob Rae in York South. He has however made a name of himself as the head of the Daily Bread Food Bank. He was seen as the leading left-of-centre candidate, and was identified by the press as the early frontrunner.

- Supporters in Caucus (3): Dominic Agostino (Hamilton East), Monte Kwinter (Wilson Heights), Gerry Phillips (Scarborough—Agincourt)
- Other prominent supporters: Former Peterson era ministers Robert Nixon, Bob Wong, Chris Ward and Charles Beer; former MPP Dianne Poole; Senator Keith Davey.

=== Dalton McGuinty ===
Dalton McGuinty, 41, a lawyer, succeeded his father Dalton McGuinty Sr. as the MPP for Ottawa South in 1990. He was seen as being from the more conservative wing of the party. Critics argued McGuinty was little more than 'Harris-lite'. Supporters countered that election of the Mike Harris government marked a transformation of thinking in Ontario politics and that the Liberals needed a right-leaning leader to compete against Harris rather than someone who would compete against NDP for a diminishing number of left-leaning voters.

- Supporters in Caucus (4): Bob Chiarelli (Ottawa West), Bernard Grandmaître (Ottawa East), Gilles Morin (Carleton East), Tony Ruprecht (Parkdale)
- Other prominent supporters: Federal Industry Minister John Manley (MP for Ottawa South), Former Waterloo North MPP Herb Epp

== Delegate selection ==
Under the procedure outlined by the party's constitution, all members of the party are eligible to cast a two-part ballot at one of the constituency association delegate selection meetings held across the province. Members vote directly for their choice of leadership candidate (or for "independent") in the top part of the ballot, and for up to 16 local delegates for the leadership convention in the bottom part of the ballot. There are also a number of women's and youth clubs that are entitled to elect delegates. Elected delegates were apportioned to leadership candidates based on their share of votes in the top part of the ballot, and are bounded to vote for their leadership candidates on the first ballot at the leadership convention. The small number of independent delegates elected can vote for whomever they chose at the convention. There were 2,386 elected delegates. There were also 514 ex-officio delegates made up of party insiders who were not committed to voting for any candidate.

Kennedy quickly attained front runner status in the race. Although he was only recently elected in a by-election he gained notoriety as head of the Daily Bread Food Bank. He was known for criticising the NDP's food policy yet coming up with practical methods to combat hunger. While four years earlier many Liberals marginalized Greg Sorbara, an Italian Canadian, as "the ethnic candidate" during the 1992 leadership contest, Cordiano, who served as Sorbara's parliamentary secretary and also an Italian Canadian, did not face the same barrier and was considered the primary challenger to Kennedy.

Kennedy emerged with a clear lead from the October delegate selection meetings. With almost 30% elected delegates, he had a lead of 200 delegates over his closest competitor. Duncan, Cordiano and McGuinty all elicited strong initial delegate support. Gerretsen, Castrilli and Kells were clearly long-shot candidates.

== Convention ==
The leadership convention was scheduled to be held at Toronto's Maple Leaf Gardens on November 29 and 30, 1996. It was remembered as a hard-fought 15½-hour battle and an organizational disaster. Although voting was supposed to start at 1 p.m. on Saturday, it didn't begin until more than two hours later, and the results of the first ballot were not available until 7:30 p.m. Candidates in last place, or with less than 5 per cent of the vote, were eliminated after each ballot.

Kennedy led after the first ballot with 30%. Cordiano, Duncan and McGuinty battled for running up, with 22%, 18% and 18% respectively. Castilli, who was only ahead of outside-caucus candidate Kells and only a dozen votes above elimination threshold, initially indicated that she was dropping out of the contest but then change her mind, contributing to a three-hour delay before the next ballot results were announced.

It was rumoured that McGuinty and Duncan had a deal that whoever was behind would drop out and endorse the other. (Other reports suggested McGuinty also had a similar deal with Cordiano.) McGuinty, who received less vote in the second ballot than the first ballot, was about to withdraw from the race after second ballot, but changed his mind as he unexpectedly received the endorsements of both Castrilli (who was eliminated) and Gerretsen (withdrawn). Gerretsen said he and McGuinty made no deal, but that his own supporters and constituents favored an eastern Ontario candidate. Castrilli supporters suggested she felt a bond with the low-profile McGuinty as a party outsider. Castrilli and Gerretsen hoisted McGuinty into the pivotal third spot and pushed Duncan from the race after the third ballot.

The third ballot result was announced after midnight. Kennedy experienced very little growth, while McGuinty leapfrogged Duncan and tied Cordiano for second place. Duncan was eliminated and endorsed Kennedy. Duncan's decision infuriated many of his supporters, and less than a third of his delegates went with him to Kennedy. CPAC's coverage of the convention infamously captured Duncan's despair after being eliminated, and the torturous conversations between him and his angry supporters.

The results of the fourth ballot was announced at about 2:30 a.m. Cordiano was eliminated and threw his support to McGuinty. There was high drama as Cordiano crossed the crowded convention floor, where McGuinty came to meet him in the centre of convention hall in full view of all the delegates. Unlike Duncan, Cordiano delivered 80% of his delegate, and was thereby largely responsible for McGuinty's victory over Kennedy for the party's leadership.

The fifth ballot, past 4 AM, came to a final direct match between Kennedy, who had led all four ballots but experienced limited growth in support, and McGuinty, who had steadily risen from an initial fourth place and surged to victory by a convincing 1,205 to 1,065 margin.

=== Ballot results ===
= Eliminated from next round
= Withdrew nomination
= Winner

Candidate	elected delegates		1st Ballot (7:31pm)		2nd Ballot (10:25pm)^{[A]}		3rd Ballot (12:39am)		4th Ballot (2:35am)		5th Ballot (4:25am)	
Name	Votes	%	Votes	%	Votes	%	Votes	%	Votes	%	Votes	%
Dalton McGuinty	410	17.2	450	17.6	440	17.6	601	23.9	750	31.1	1205	53.1
Gerard Kennedy	703	29.5	770	30.1	775	30.9	803	31.9	968	40.1	1065	46.9
Joseph Cordiano	497	20.8	557	21.8	570	22.7	601	23.9	696	28.8	Supported McGuinty	
Dwight Duncan	393	16.5	464	18.1	474	18.9	509	20.3	Supported Kennedy			
John Gerretsen	129	5.4	152	6.0	124	5.0	Supported McGuinty					
Anna-Marie Castrilli	110	4.6	141	5.5	122	4.9	Supported McGuinty					
Greg Kells	17	0.7	24	0.9	Released delegates							
Independent	127	5.3										
Total	2386	100.0	2558	100.0	2505	100.0	2514	100.0	2414	100.0	2270	100.0

^{A} Castrilli initially withdrew from the 2nd ballot but subsequently returned, causing a delay in voting

== Aftermath ==
After the contest, McGuinty named Cordiano, who was widely seen as the kingmaker, as deputy leader. Cordiano was however replaced by Gerry Phillips in 1998.

The subsequent 1999 election saw the legislature reduced from 130 to 103 seats, resulting in many MPPs having to compete with each other for re-election. Cordiano and Kennedy initially competed for the nomination in the redistributed riding of York South—Weston, but Kennedy was convinced by the party leadership to run in the new riding of Parkdale—High Park. In a highly divisive and race-driven contest, Castrilli was defeated for the party's nomination in York Centre by Monte Kwinter. McGuinty unsuccessfully tried to convince Castrilli to run in a different riding. Castrilli defected on the day the writ was dropped, became the Progressive Conservative candidate against Kennedy in Parkdale—High Park, and was defeated by Kennedy.

Castrilli's indecision after the first ballot caused the party to institute rules imposing time limit and irrevocable written notice requirement for withdrawal in future conventions. Those rules impacted the second ballot of the 2013 convention, where Harinder Takhar endorsed Sandra Pupatello after the first ballot, but missed the withdrawal deadline and remained on the second ballot.

McGuinty lost the 1999 election, but successful fought back a leadership review later in 1999 with 80% support and remained leader. He won in 2003 and served as Premier for almost ten years until 2013. Cordiano, Duncan, Kennedy and Gerretsen all served as senior cabinet ministers in the government of McGuinty.

Kennedy left the government and unsuccessfully sought the federal party leadership in 2006, but was instrumental sealing the victory for Stephane Dion, another victor who started from fourth place. His federal bid also ushered future prime minister Justin Trudeau into the formal partisan political arena as one of his prominent backer. His first ministerial chief-of-staff and 2006 campaign manager Katie Telford would go on to become the longest tenured Chief of Staff to the Prime Minister in Canadian history.

After leading the party through one defeat, two majority and one minority victories, McGuinty announced his pending resignation in late 2012, triggering the 2013 leadership contest. Kennedy entered that contest, this time with the support of Cordiano, the erstwhile rival who delivered the final blow to his 1996 bid, but with somewhat diminished statue after losing a federal leadership bid in 2006 and his local federal seat in 2011. After finishing distant third in the first and second ballots, Kennedy threw his support to the eventual winner Kathleen Wynne over frontrunner Sandra Pupatello (who chaired Duncan's 1996 leadership bid, and succeeded Kennedy as education minister). In that contest, Gerretsen was the most senior caucus supporter of Wynne, and served as Wynne's Attorney General during the first 16 months of her government.
