= David Ramsay (Ontario politician) =

Canadian politician (1948–2020)

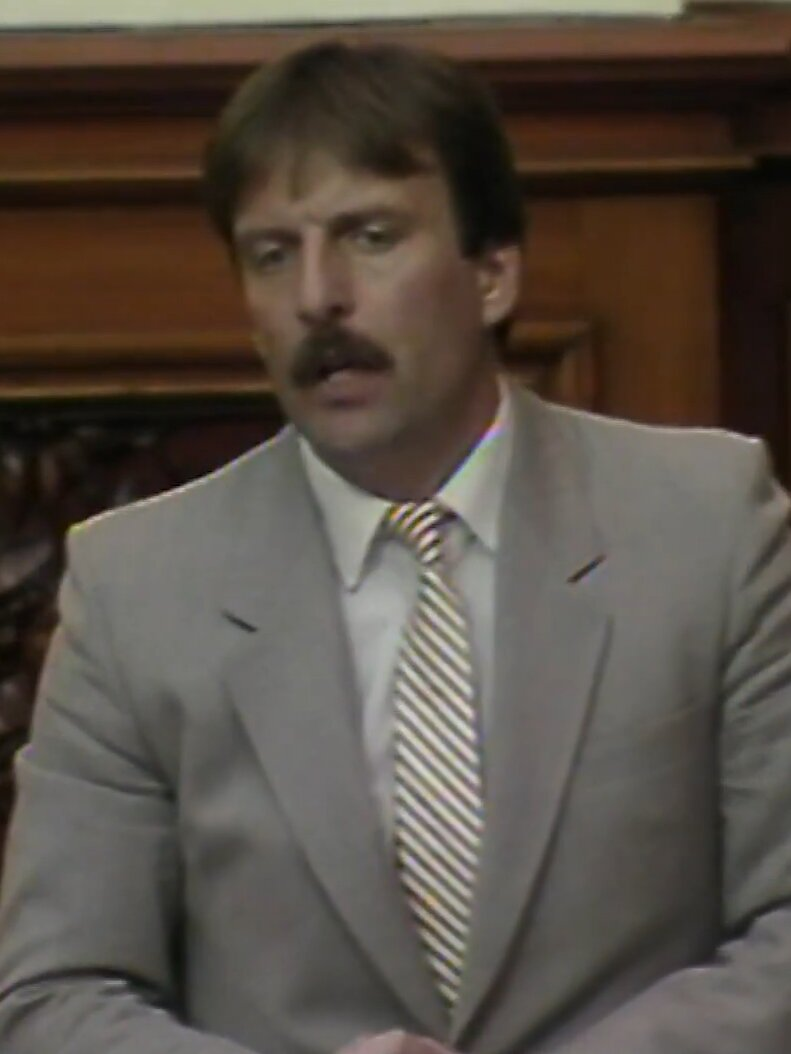
- Ramsay in 1986

Ontario MPP
- In office 1999–2011
- Preceded by: New riding
- Succeeded by: John Vanthof
- Constituency: Timiskaming—Cochrane
- In office 1985–1999
- Preceded by: Ed Havrot
- Succeeded by: Riding abolished
- Constituency: Timiskaming

Personal details
- Born: April 23, 1948 Sydney, Australia
- Died: July 29, 2020 (aged 72) Halifax, Nova Scotia, Canada
- Party: New Democrat → Liberal
- Occupation: Farmer

David James Ramsay (April 23, 1948 – July 29, 2020) was a Canadian politician in Ontario. He was elected as a New Democratic member of the Legislative Assembly of Ontario in 1985 and crossed the floor a year later to join the Liberal Party. He represented the northern Ontario riding of Timiskaming from 1985 to 1999 and the redistributed riding of Timiskaming—Cochrane from 1999 to 2011. He served as a cabinet minister in the governments of David Peterson and Dalton McGuinty.

== Background ==
Born in Australia, Ramsay moved to Canada with his parents at age one after having been adopted in Sydney, and was raised in Oakville, Ontario. He attended Concordia University in Montreal, and after graduation worked as a farmer in New Liskeard and a clerk-treasurer in Casey Township, in northern Ontario. He later served as president of the Timiskaming Federation of Agriculture in 1984-85, was a founding member of the Timiskaming Grain Growers Board, and served as chair of the Timiskaming Hospital Board for a time. Ramsay died in Halifax, Nova Scotia, on July 29, 2020, at the age of 72.

== Political career ==
=== Election as a New Democrat ===
In the 1985 provincial election he ran as the New Democrat candidate in the northern Ontario riding of Timiskaming. He defeated Progressive Conservative incumbent Ed Havrot by almost 3,000 votes, as the once-powerful Tory machine in northern Ontario began to lose its support base. He served as a critic of Small Business, Financial Institutions, and Agriculture and Food.

=== Becoming a Liberal ===
On October 6, 1986, Ramsay crossed the floor to join the governing Liberals, claiming that Northern Ontario needed greater representation in government. (Ramsay also seems to have disliked the Toronto leadership of the NDP, describing it as out of touch with his rural/populist base.)

Despite an intense effort by the NDP to defeat Ramsay in the 1987 election, he won re-election by over 4,000 votes. On September 29, 1987, Ramsay was appointed to David Peterson's cabinet as Minister of Correctional Services. Following a cabinet shuffle on August 2, 1989, he was named Minister of Agriculture and Food. Ramsay kept his seat in the 1990 election that defeated the Liberal government and brought Ramsay's former party, the NDP, to power under Bob Rae.

He ran for the leadership of the Liberal Party in the 1992 Liberal leadership convention, but placed last in a field of six candidates. Like fellow candidate Greg Sorbara, his campaign included both right-wing and left-wing elements. He supported tax reduction (including lower gasoline taxes, a reduction in the Provincial Sales Tax and a one-year moratorium on the federal Goods and Services Tax), and favoured open Sunday shopping and allowing corner stores to sell beer and wine. He also supported pay equity measures, and described himself as pro-choice on abortion.

In the provincial elections of 1995 and 1999, Ramsay's primary opposition came not from the New Democrats but the Progressive Conservatives, whose leader Mike Harris represented a neighbouring riding. He won by a clear margin on both occasions. In 1996, he endorsed Dwight Duncan's bid to lead the Ontario Liberal Party.

Ramsay served as caucus chair from 1993 to 1994 and again from 1999 to 2003.

With the victory of the Liberals under the leadership of Dalton McGuinty in the 2003 election, Ramsay returned to cabinet as Minister of Natural Resources on October 23, 2003. He was also given responsibility for Aboriginal Affairs on June 29, 2005. In June 2007, Ramsay was appointed Ontario's first Minister of Aboriginal Affairs.

In the 2007 provincial election, Ramsay won by 634 votes over NDP candidate John Vanthof. Ramsay expected to continue as a minister but was dropped from cabinet. Instead he was appointed as McGuinty's Parliamentary Assistant.

In January 2011, he said that he was retiring from politics and would not run in the 2011 election.

=== Cabinet positions ===
McGuinty ministry, Province of Ontario (2003–2013)
Cabinet posts (2)
Predecessor	Office	Successor
New Ministry	Minister of Aboriginal Affairs; 2007 (June–October)	Michael Bryant
Jerry Ouellette	Minister of Natural Resources; 2003-2007; Also responsible for Aboriginal Affairs (2005-2007)	Donna Cansfield
Peterson ministry, Province of Ontario (1985–1990)
Cabinet posts (2)
Predecessor	Office	Successor
Jack Riddell	Minister of Agriculture and Food; 1989–1990	Elmer Buchanan
Ken Keyes	Minister of Correctional Services; 1987–1989	Richard Patten
