= Wrye =

Surname list

Wrye is a surname. Notable people with the surname include:

- Bill Wrye (born 1944), Canadian politician
- Donald Wrye (1934–2015), American director, screenwriter, and producer
- Leo Wrye Zimmerman (1924–2008), American abstract artist
