= Peterson ministry =

Cabinet of Ontario, 1985–1990

- Ministry of Ontario, Canada

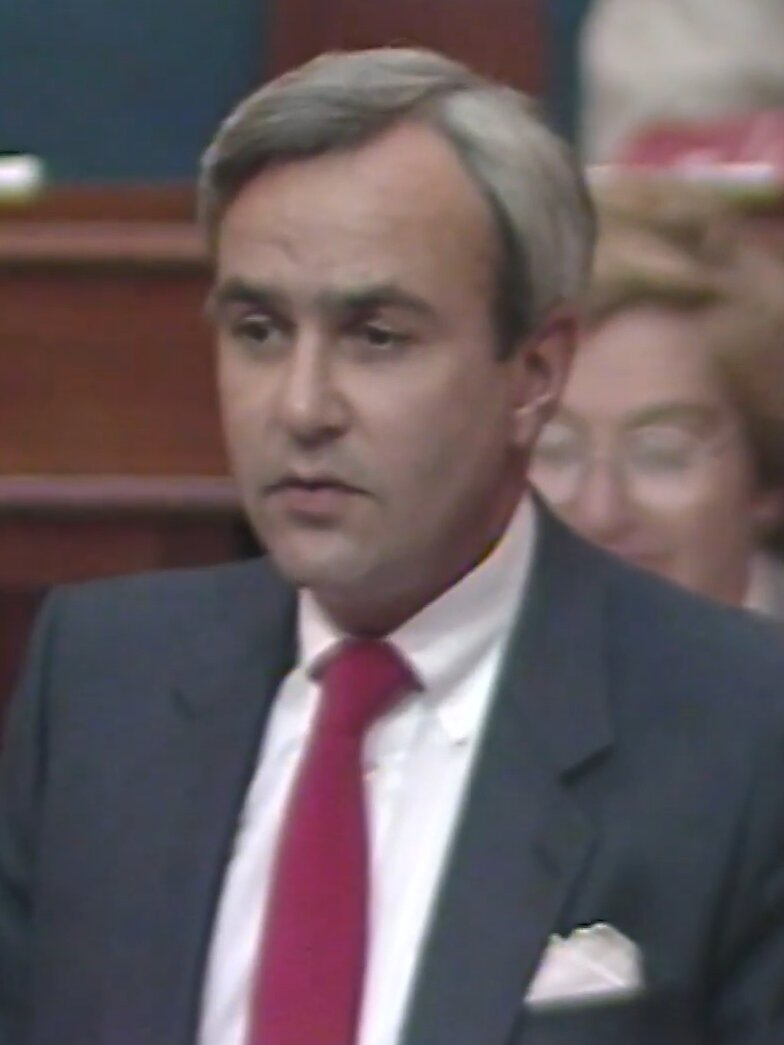
- Premier David Peterson in the legislature in 1986
- Date formed: June 26, 1985
- Date dissolved: October 1, 1990

People and organizations
- Monarch: Elizabeth II
- Lieutenant Governor: John Black Aird (1985); Lincoln Alexander (1985-90)
- Premier: David Peterson
- Deputy Premier: Robert Nixon (1987-90)
- No. of ministers: 23 (at start); 30 (max at Sept. 1987)
- Total no. of members: 39
- Member party: Liberal
- Status in legislature: Minority (1985-87); Majority (1987-90)
- Opposition party: PC Party (1985-87); NDP (1987-90)
- Opposition leader: Frank Miller (1985); Larry Grossman (1985-87); Bob Rae (1987-90)

History
- Incoming formation: 1985 election
- Outgoing formation: 1990 election
- Elections: 1985, 1987
- Legislature terms: 33rd, 34th Parliaments
- Predecessor: Miller ministry
- Successor: Rae ministry

The Peterson ministry was the cabinet (formally the Executive Council of Ontario) of the provincial government of Ontario from June 26, 1985, to October 1, 1990. It was led by the 20th Premier of Ontario, David Peterson. The ministry was made up of members of the Ontario Liberal Party, which commanded a first a minority and later a majority in the Legislative Assembly of Ontario.

The formation of this Liberal ministry ended forty-two consecutive years of Conservative rules in Ontario. It replaced the Miller ministry following the 1985 Ontario general election, during which the Peterson-led Liberals won a slightly larger share of popular vote but four fewer seats than the incumbent Progressive Conservative Party. The Liberals secured the support of the third-place New Democratic Party (NDP) with a formal agreement to implement certain NDP policy priorities in exchange for confidence and supply backing for a fixed period of two years, during which the Liberals agreed not to trigger an election. The ministry renewed its governing mandate in the 1987 general election during which it secured a massive sixty-seat majority with 95 seats, the largest number of seats secured by a single party in Ontario history. (Note: It was however far from the largest proportion of seats given the enlarged 130-seat legislature. Premiers James Whitney, Howard Ferguson, Mitch Hepburn and Leslie Frost had all lead caucuses that constituted larger proportion of the legislature.) The ministry was defeated in a shocking upset in the 1990 general election, and was replaced by the NDP Rae Ministry.

== Overview ==
The Peterson ministry entered office on June 26, 1985, eight weeks after the general election and shortly after the predecessor Miller ministry fell to a vote of non-confidence in the Ontario Legislative Assembly. Peterson and his 23-member cabinet took their oath in an outdoor ceremony on the south lawn at Queen’s Park.

Peterson entrusted the three led negotiators with the NDP some of the most crucial portfolios, naming Robert Nixon, Sean Conway and Ian Scott respectively as finance minister, education minister, and Attorney General. The three remained the most trusted team members throughout the ministry's tenure. When Peterson seek to convene his most senior advisors for counsel, the presumption was to include the three.

Peterson elevated Elinor Caplan, was the first Jewish woman to serve in ministry in Canada at either the federal or provincial level, and handed her the twin portfolios of government services and management board secretariat.

The ministry included the first and the second visible minority persons to serve in Ontario cabinet. Alvin Curling, one of the 23 original members as housing minister, is the first visible minority person to serve in a provincial cabinet. Bob Wong, who joined the team in 1987 as energy minister, is the first Chinese Canadian to serve in a cabinet.

Over its five-year tenure, the Peterson ministry had 39 different members, including eight women, and the two visible minority members in Ontario ministries. Its membership range from 21 ministers (June 1986 to Sept 1987, when both Elinor Caplan and René Fontaine were out of cabinet) to 30 ministers (at the 1987 post election shuffle).

== Portfolio realignments ==
Mindful of his minority mandate, Peterson did not make drastic changes to portfolio responsibilities upon entering government in 1985. The extent of his initial reorganization was as follows:

- elimination of the three provincial secretaries positions created by Davis in 1971.
- dividing of housing and municipal affairs into two separate portfolios.
- addition of "technology" to the name of the industry portfolio
- restoration of "mines" to the name of northern affairs; the ministry would further rename to "Ministry of Northern Development and Mines" just a few months later

With 27 portfolios to cover among 23 members, four would have to cover more than one. Thankfully, the four pairing were all closely related: Peterson himself (premier, intergovernmental affairs), Caplan (government services, management board); Greg Sorbara (colleges & universities; skills development); Ken Keyes (Solicitor General; correctional services).

While still in minority, the Peterson ministry created a new Ministry of Financial Institutions in April, 1986.

=== Changes while in majority ===
There were several instances of ministerial portfolio reorganisation:

- Ministry of Citizenship and Culture and Ministry of Transportation and Communication were reorganised into Ministry of Citizenship, Ministry of Culture and Communication, and Ministry of Transportation.
- Ministry of Northern Development and Mines was divided into Ministry of Northern Development and Ministry of Mines.
- Ministry of Municipal Affairs and Ministry of Housing was combined into "Ministry of Municipal Affairs and Housing".

Thus the number of portfolios increased to 30, as did the number of cabinet members.

=== Enabling legislation ===
The predecessor Miller ministry created a skill development portfolio but obviously did not get around to table enabling legislation. The new minister, Greg Sorbara tabled enabling legislation in the two session of the 35th Parliament.

== Composition Changes ==
Peterson largely kept his team in place during the two years the Liberals were dependant on the NDP for confidence and supply. In the three instances where his minister got into trouble, his responses were defensive and cautious. In June 1986, Elinor Caplan, widely consider one of the strongest performers while holding two heavy portfolio, resigned to fight against accusations of a conflict of interest relating to her husband's business dealings. Ten days later, mining minister René Fontaine resigned with messier story, but also about conflict of interest. Rather than appointing new ministers, Peterson asked his trusted allies, each with crucial portfolios, to take on extra duties. Caplan's work was spread to education minister Sean Conway, finance minister Bob Nixon and environment minister Jim Bradley, and Peterson himself took on the northern development and mines brief. He took the same approach when it was no longer tenable for Ken Keyes to be Solicitor General, the brief was given to Attorney General Ian Scott.

=== 1987 Post-election shuffle ===
The Peterson ministry underwent a significant reorganization following their victory at the 1987 Ontario general election, improving from minority status to a majority, securing 95 out of 130 seats, the largest government caucus in the Ontario legislature. A significantly larger caucus portended a significantly larger cabinet, and an end to the situation in which so many cabinet members had to helm multiple portfolios.

A visible focus of the shuffle was promoting women into key roles. Having been in the penalty box for a year, both Elinor Caplan and Rene Fontaine both returned to cabinet, with Caplan given a promotion to health. Joan Smith, wife of EllisDon founder Don Smith, was previously kept out of cabinet because her husband many business dealing with the government. The Premier believed the new conflict-of-interest legislation is sufficient to cover that concern and appointed her Solicitor General. There rookie women also entered cabinet – future party leader Lyn McLeod, Chaviva Hošek who chaired Prime Minister Mulroney National Economic Conference and Mavis Wilson, with McLeod given the big budget colleges and universities brief. Three male rookie also went straight in – Richard Patten, Gerry Phillips, Bob Wong. Three non-rookie round out the slate of nine newly promoted – Remo Mancini, David Ramsay and Chris Ward who got the crucial education portfolio. While no cabinet member lost their seats in the election, Peterson sent relieved Ron Van Horne, Tony Ruprecht, Ken Keyes three from their frontbench duties.

=== 1989 midterm shuffle ===
The number of women would fall to five, but at last the Minister Responsible for Women's Issues would for the first time actually be a woman.

Thus, as the election of 1990 approached, the Peterson ministry contained 25 cabinet members in 29 portfolios.

=== Election of 1990 ===
In anticipation of a general economic downturn in North America, Peterson sought to take advantage of polling numbers that were still favouring the Liberals in 1990 and called a snap election, less than three years into the massive majority mandated secured in 1987. At the time the election writ was dropped, the Liberals stood at 50% support in the polls, and Peterson's personal approval popularity was even higher at 54% due to strong public approval of his role during the negotiation of the Meech Lake accord. The move was however seen by many as arrogant and opportunistic, and public sentiment turned against the Peterson ministry quickly. A number of prominent members of the ministry, most notably Greg Sorbara and Jim Bradley, were reportedly strongly opposed to the early election call. Sean Conway, a member of Peterson's inner circle, would later acknowledge that most backbench MPPs also opposed the timing of the campaign.

Despite the Liberals retained closed to a third of the popular vote, the Liberal caucus was decimated with a fifty-nine seats net loss. The defeat was so far-reaching that the Premier was defeated in his own constituency by a 8,000-vote margin. In addition to the Premier, the election claimed seven incumbent members and six former members of the Peterson ministry as casualties.

Incumbent ministers

- Richard Patten (Ottawa Centre), Minister of Correctional Services
- Mavis Wilson (Dufferin—Peel), Minister Responsible for Women's Issues
- Ken Black (Muskoka-Georgian Bay), Minister of Tourism and Recreation and Minister Responsible for Anti-Drug Strategy
- Bob Wong (Fort York) Minister of Citizenship and Minister Responsible for Race Relations and the Ontario Human Rights Commission
- Shirley Collins (Wentworth East), minister without portfolio
- Chris Ward (Wentworth North), Minister of Government Services
- Bill Wrye (Windsor—Sandwich), Minister of Transportation

Former ministers

- Ken Keyes (Kingston and the Islands)
- Ed Fulton (Scarborough East)
- Christine Hart (York East)
- Chaviva Hošek (Oakwood)
- Lily Oddie Munro (Hamilton Centre)
- Joan Smith (London South)

== Postscript ==
Having lost his own London seat in 1990, Peterson announced his resignation as party leader on the night of the election. The Peterson ministry was formally dissolved on October 1, 1990 when the successor Rae ministry took office. Having been retired by voters at just age 47, Peterson reembarked on the legal career he touched only briefly in his youth, and become one of Toronto's influential rainmakers and Liberal backroom power broker.

The contest to succeed Peterson feature five former members of the ministry – Murray Elston, Greg Sorbara, Charles Beer, David Ramsay, along with backbencher Steve Mahoney, and elected the first woman party leader Lyn McLeod.

After two more electoral defeats, the Liberals returned to power in 2003 led by Dalton McGuinty, the only Liberal rookie in the disastrous 1990 election. McGuinty ministry featured five members of the Peterson ministry – Jim Bradley, Monte Kwinter, Greg Sorbara, David Ramsay, Gerry Phillips. Sorbara stepped up to be party president in the opposition years, served as finance minister upon the Liberals return to power, and chaired McGuinty's three successful election campaign. Bradley stayed on to serve in the Wynne ministry, and held his prized environment portfolio in all three Liberal ministry, and soldier on until 2016, 30 years after he was first raise to cabinet, when he step down from cabinet to make room for younger women.

== List of ministers ==
=== By seniority ===
Minister	Ministerial service			Parliamentary Service		
Minister	Start	End	Timespan	Year	Electoral district	Region
David Peterson	June 26, 1985	Oct 1, 1990		1975	London Centre	Southwest
Robert Nixon	June 26, 1985	Oct 1, 1990		1962	Brant-Oxford-Norfolk/-Haldimand	South Central
Jack Riddell	June 26, 1985	Aug 2, 1989		1973	Huron—Middlesex; Huron	Southwest
Sean Conway	June 26, 1985	Oct 1, 1990		1975	Renfrew North	East
John Eakins	June 26, 1985	Aug 2, 1989		1975	Victoria—Haliburton	Central
Vincent Kerrio	June 26, 1985	Aug 2, 1989		1975	Niagara Falls	South Central
Hugh O'Neil	June 26, 1985	Oct 1, 1990		1975	Quinte	Central
John Sweeney	June 26, 1985	Oct 1, 1990		1975	Kitchener—Wilmot	South Central
Jim Bradley	June 26, 1985	Oct 1, 1990		1977	St. Catharines	South Central
Ron Van Horne	June 26, 1985	Sep 29, 1987		1977	London North	Southwest
Murray Elston	June 26, 1985	Oct 1, 1990		1981	Huron—Bruce; Bruce	Southwest
Tony Ruprecht	June 26, 1985	Sep 29, 1987		1981	Parkdale	Toronto
Bill Wrye	June 26, 1985	Oct 1, 1990		1981	Windsor—Sandwich	Southwest
Bernard Grandmaître	June 26, 1985	Aug 2, 1989		1984	Ottawa East	East
Elinor Caplan	June 26, 1985	June 16, 1986		1985	Oriole	Toronto
Elinor Caplan	Sep 29, 1987	Oct 1, 1990		1985	Oriole	Toronto
Alvin Curling	June 26, 1985	Aug 2, 1989		1985	Scarborough North	Toronto
René Fontaine	June 26, 1985	June 26, 1986		1985	Cochrane North	North
René Fontaine	Sep 29, 1987	August 8, 1990		1985	Cochrane North	North
Ed Fulton	June 26, 1985	Aug 2, 1989		1985	Scarborough East	Toronto
Ken Keyes	June 26, 1985	Sep 29, 1987		1985	Kingston and the Islands	East
Monte Kwinter	June 26, 1985	Oct 1, 1990		1985	Wilson Heights	Toronto
Lily Munro	June 26, 1985	Aug 2, 1989		1985	Hamilton Centre	South Central
Ian Scott	June 26, 1985	Oct 1, 1990		1985	St. David; St. George—St. David	Toronto
Greg Sorbara	June 26, 1985	Oct 1, 1990		1985	York Centre	Central
Joan Smith	Sep 29, 1987	June 6, 1989		1985	London South	Southwest
Remo Mancini	Sep 29, 1987	Oct 1, 1990		1975	Essex South	Southwest
David Ramsay	Sep 29, 1987	Oct 1, 1990		1985	Timiskaming	North
Chris Ward	Sep 29, 1987	Oct 1, 1990		1985	Wentworth North	South Central
Chaviva Hošek	Sep 29, 1987	Aug 2, 1989		1987	Oakwood	Toronto
Lyn McLeod	Sep 29, 1987	Oct 1, 1990		1987	Fort William	North
Richard Patten	Sep 29, 1987	Oct 1, 1990		1987	Ottawa Centre	East
Gerry Phillips	Sep 29, 1987	Oct 1, 1990		1987	Scarborough—Agincourt	Toronto
Mavis Wilson	Sep 29, 1987	Oct 1, 1990		1987	Dufferin—Peel	South Central
Bob Wong	Sep 29, 1987	Oct 1, 1990		1987	Fort York	Toronto
Charles Beer	Aug 2, 1989	Oct 1, 1990		1987	York North	Central
Ken Black	Aug 2, 1989	June 28, 1990		1987	Muskoka—Georgian Bay	North
Shirley Collins	Aug 2, 1989	Oct 1, 1990		1987	Wentworth East	South Central
Christine Hart	Aug 2, 1989	May 30, 1990		1986	York East	Toronto
Gilles Morin	Aug 2, 1989	Oct 1, 1990		1985	Carleton East	East
Steven Offer	Aug 2, 1989	Oct 1, 1990		1985	Mississauga North	South Central

=== By portfolio ===
Portfolio	Minister	Tenure	
Portfolio	Minister	Start	End
Central administration
Premier and President of the Council	David Peterson	June 26, 1985	Oct 1, 1990
Minister of Intergovernmental Affairs	David Peterson	June 26, 1985	Oct 1, 1990
Deputy Premier of Ontario (Note: No Deputy Premier designated before September 1987) (Note: Non-portfolio designation)	Robert Nixon	Sep 29, 1987	Oct 1, 1990
Treasurer and Minister of Economics	Robert Nixon	June 26, 1985	Oct 1, 1990
Chair of the Management Board of Cabinet	Elinor Caplan	June 26, 1985	June 16, 1986
Chair of the Management Board of Cabinet	Robert Nixon a.i.	June 16, 1986	Sep 29, 1987
Chair of the Management Board of Cabinet	Murray Elston	Sep 29, 1987	Oct 1, 1990
Minister of Revenue	Robert Nixon	June 26, 1985	Sep 29, 1987
Minister of Revenue	Bernard Grandmaître	Sep 29, 1987	Aug 2, 1989
Minister of Revenue	Remo Mancini	Aug 2, 1989	Oct 1, 1990
Judiciary and law enforcement
Attorney General	Ian Scott	June 26, 1985	Oct 1, 1990
Solicitor General (Note: The solicitor general portfolio and correctional services portfolio remained separate portfolio, though held concurrently at times.)	Ken Keyes (Note: Keyes resigned as Solicitor General over a boating infraction, but remained in cabinet and retained correctional services portfolio)	June 26, 1985	Dec 3, 1986
Solicitor General	Ian Scott a.i.	Dec 3, 1986	Jan 7, 1987
Solicitor General	Ken Keyes	Jan 7, 1987	Sep 29, 1987
Solicitor General	Joan Smith	Sep 29, 1987	June 6, 1989
Solicitor General	Ian Scott a.i.	June 6, 1989	Aug 2, 1989
Solicitor General	Steven Offer	Aug 2, 1989	Oct 1, 1990
Minister of Correctional Services	Ken Keyes	June 26, 1985	Sep 29, 1987
Minister of Correctional Services	David Ramsay	Sep 29, 1987	Aug 2, 1989
Minister of Correctional Services	Richard Patten	Aug 2, 1989	Oct 1, 1990
Education and human services
Minister of Education	Sean Conway	June 26, 1985	Sep 29, 1987
Minister of Education	Chris Ward	Sep 29, 1987	Aug 2, 1989
Minister of Education	Sean Conway	Aug 2, 1989	Oct 1, 1990
Minister of Colleges and Universities	Greg Sorbara	June 26, 1985	Sep 29, 1987
Minister of Colleges and Universities	Lyn McLeod	Sep 29, 1987	Aug 2, 1989
Minister of Colleges and Universities	Sean Conway	Aug 2, 1989	Oct 1, 1990
Minister of Skills Development	Greg Sorbara	June 26, 1985	Sep 29, 1987
Minister of Skills Development	Alvin Curling	Sep 29, 1987	Aug 2, 1989
Minister of Skills Development	Sean Conway	Aug 2, 1989	Oct 1, 1990
Minister of Labour	Bill Wrye	June 26, 1985	Sep 29, 1987
Minister of Labour	Greg Sorbara	Sep 29, 1987	Aug 2, 1989
Minister of Labour	Gerry Phillips	Aug 2, 1989	Oct 1, 1990
Minister of Community and Social Services	John Sweeney	June 26, 1985	Aug 2, 1989
Minister of Community and Social Services	Charles Beer	Aug 2, 1989	Oct 1, 1990
Minister of Health	Murray Elston	June 26, 1985	Sep 29, 1987
Minister of Health	Elinor Caplan	Sep 29, 1987	Oct 1, 1990
Resources and industries
Minister of Agriculture and Food	Jack Riddell	June 26, 1985	Aug 2, 1989
Minister of Agriculture and Food	David Ramsay	Aug 2, 1989	Oct 1, 1990
Minister of Energy	Vincent Kerrio	June 26, 1985	Sep 29, 1987
Minister of Energy	Bob Wong	Sep 29, 1987	Aug 2, 1989
Minister of Energy	Lyn McLeod	Aug 2, 1989	Oct 1, 1990
Minister of Natural Resources	Vincent Kerrio	June 26, 1985	Aug 2, 1989
Minister of Natural Resources	Lyn McLeod	Aug 2, 1989	Oct 1, 1990
Minister of Northern Affairs and Mines (to Nov 27, 1985); Minister of Northern Development and Mines (to Sep 29, 1987); Minister of Northern Development (after Sep 29, 1987)	René Fontaine	June 26, 1985	June 26, 1986
Minister of Northern Affairs and Mines (to Nov 27, 1985); Minister of Northern Development and Mines (to Sep 29, 1987); Minister of Northern Development (after Sep 29, 1987)	David Peterson a.i.	June 26, 1986	Sep 29, 1987
Minister of Northern Affairs and Mines (to Nov 27, 1985); Minister of Northern Development and Mines (to Sep 29, 1987); Minister of Northern Development (after Sep 29, 1987)	René Fontaine	Sep 29, 1987	Aug 8, 1990
Minister of Northern Affairs and Mines (to Nov 27, 1985); Minister of Northern Development and Mines (to Sep 29, 1987); Minister of Northern Development (after Sep 29, 1987)	David Ramsay	August 20, 1990	Oct 1, 1990
Minister of Mines	Sean Conway	Sep 29, 1987	Aug 2, 1989
Minister of Mines	Hugh O'Neil	Aug 2, 1989	Oct 1, 1990
Minister of Culture and Communication (Note: created Sep 29, 1987, from "Citizenship and Culture," with a new mandate in communications.)	Lily Oddie Munro	Sep 29, 1987	Aug 2, 1989
Minister of Culture and Communication	Christine Hart	Aug 2, 1989	May 30, 1990
Minister of Culture and Communication	Hugh O'Neil	June 5, 1990	Oct 1, 1990
Minister of Financial Institutions	Monte Kwinter	April 1, 1986	Sep 29, 1987
Minister of Financial Institutions	Robert Nixon	Sep 29, 1987	Aug 16, 1988
Minister of Financial Institutions	Murray Elston	Aug 16, 1988	Oct 1, 1990
Minister of Industry, Trade and Technology	Hugh O'Neil	June 26, 1985	Sep 29, 1987
Minister of Industry, Trade and Technology	Monte Kwinter	Sep 29, 1987	Oct 1, 1990
Minister of Tourism and Recreation	John Eakins	June 26, 1985	Sep 29, 1987
Minister of Tourism and Recreation	Hugh O'Neil	Sep 29, 1987	Aug 2, 1989
Minister of Tourism and Recreation	Ken Black	Aug 2, 1989	June 28, 1990
Public assets and services
Minister of Citizenship and Culture	Lily Oddie Munro	June 26, 1985	Sep 29, 1987
Minister of Citizenship	Gerry Phillips	Sep 29, 1987	Aug 2, 1989
Minister of Citizenship	Bob Wong	Aug 2, 1989	Oct 1, 1990
Minister of Consumer and Commercial Relations	Monte Kwinter	June 26, 1985	Sep 29, 1987
Minister of Consumer and Commercial Relations	Bill Wrye	Sep 29, 1987	Aug 2, 1989
Minister of Consumer and Commercial Relations	Greg Sorbara	Aug 2, 1989	Oct 1, 1990
Minister of the Environment	Jim Bradley	June 26, 1985	Oct 1, 1990
Minister of Government Services	Elinor Caplan	June 26, 1985	June 16, 1986
Minister of Government Services	Sean Conway	June 16, 1986	Sep 29, 1987
Minister of Government Services	Richard Patten	Sep 29, 1987	Aug 2, 1989
Minister of Government Services	Chris Ward	Aug 2, 1989	Oct 1, 1990
Minister of Municipal Affairs	Bernard Grandmaître	June 26, 1985	Sep 29, 1987
Minister of Municipal Affairs	John Eakins	Sep 29, 1987	Aug 2, 1989
Minister of Municipal Affairs	John Sweeney	Aug 2, 1989	Oct 1, 1990
Minister of Housing	Alvin Curling	June 26, 1985	Sep 29, 1987
Minister of Housing	Chaviva Hošek	Sep 29, 1987	Aug 2, 1989
Minister of Housing	John Sweeney	Aug 2, 1989	Oct 1, 1990
Minister of Transportation & Communication (to Sep 29, 1987) Minister of Transportation (after Sep 29, 1987)	Ed Fulton	June 26, 1985	Aug 2, 1989
Minister of Transportation & Communication (to Sep 29, 1987) Minister of Transportation (after Sep 29, 1987)	Bill Wrye	Aug 2, 1989	Oct 1, 1990
Non-portfolio assignments = held role while minister without portfolio
Chair of Cabinet	Jim Bradley	June 16, 1986	September 29, 1987
Chair of Cabinet	Murray Elston	September 29, 1987	October 1, 1990
Chair of Cabinet	Elinor Caplan	June 26, 1985	June 16, 1986
House Leader	Robert Nixon	June 26, 1985	July 31, 1987
House Leader	Sean Conway	Sep 29, 1987	Aug 2, 1989
House Leader	Chris Ward	Aug 2, 1989	Aug 2, 1990
Minister Responsible for Native Affairs	Ian Scott	June 26, 1985	Oct 1, 1990
Minister Responsible for Francophone Affairs	Bernard Grandmaître	June 26, 1985	Aug 2, 1989
Minister Responsible for Francophone Affairs	Charles Beer	Aug 2, 1989	Oct 1, 1990
Minister Responsible for Race Relations and Ontario Human Rights Commission	Gerry Phillips	Sep 29, 1987	Aug 2, 1989
Minister Responsible for Race Relations and Ontario Human Rights Commission	Bob Wong	Aug 2, 1989	Oct 1, 1990
Minister Responsible for Women's Issues	Ian Scott	June 26, 1985	Sep 29, 1987
Minister Responsible for Women's Issues	Greg Sorbara	Sep 29, 1987	Aug 2, 1989
Minister Responsible for Women's Issues	Mavis Wilson	Aug 2, 1989	Oct 1, 1990
Minister Responsible for Anti-Drug Strategy	Ken Black	Aug 2, 1989	June 28, 1990
Minister Responsible for Senior Citizens Affairs	Ron Van Horne	June 26, 1985	Sep 29, 1987
Minister Responsible for Senior Citizens Affairs	Mavis Wilson	Sep 29, 1987	Aug 2, 1989
Minister Responsible for Senior Citizens Affairs	Gilles Morin	Aug 2, 1989	Oct 1, 1990
Minister Responsible for Disabled Persons	Tony Ruprecht	June 26, 1985	Sep 29, 1987
Minister Responsible for Disabled Persons	Remo Mancini	Sep 29, 1987	Aug 2, 1989
Minister Responsible for Disabled Persons	Shirley Collins	Aug 2, 1989	Oct 1, 1990
Minister Responsible for Multiculturalism	Tony Ruprecht	June 26, 1985	Sep 29, 1987
Minister Responsible for Multiculturalism	Bob Wong	Aug 2, 1989	Oct 1, 1990
