= Al Palladini =

Canadian politician (1943–2001)

Ontario MPP
- In office 1999–2001
- Preceded by: Riding established
- Succeeded by: Greg Sorbara
- Constituency: Vaughan—King—Aurora
- In office 1995–1999
- Preceded by: Greg Sorbara
- Succeeded by: Riding abolished
- Constituency: York Centre

Personal details
- Born: December 24, 1943 Prossedi, Italy
- Died: March 7, 2001 (aged 57) Near Acapulco, Mexico
- Party: Progressive Conservative
- Occupation: Automobile sales

Al Palladini (December 24, 1943 – March 7, 2001) was a politician in Ontario, Canada. He was a Progressive Conservative member of the Legislative Assembly of Ontario from 1995 to 2001, and was a cabinet minister in the government of Mike Harris.

== Background ==
Palladini was born in Prossedi, Italy. He was the owner of Al Palladini's Pine Tree Lincoln Mercury automobile dealership in Woodbridge, Ontario becoming locally famous for the slogan, "Any Palladini is a pal of mine" in a series of ads conceived by CHUM Radio's Larry MacInnis, and voiced by a young Rick Moranis when he was an announcer at CHUM FM radio in Toronto. He was named Canadian World Auto Marketer of the Year in 1994, and was the Vaughan Outstanding Business Achievement Award the same year. Palladini also served as Chair of the York-Finch General Hospital Foundation, and was a Director of the York University Scholarship Alliance Board.

== Politics ==
He was elected in the riding of York Centre in the provincial election of 1995, defeating Liberal Mario Ferri by more than 8,000 votes (the riding had previously been held by high-profile Liberal Greg Sorbara). On June 26, 1995, he was named Minister of Transportation. Following a cabinet shuffle on October 10, 1997, he was named Minister of Economic Development, Trade and Tourism.

Palladini was re-elected in the provincial election of 1999, defeating Liberal Tony Genco by about 7,500 votes in the redistributed riding of Vaughan—King—Aurora. After the election, his portfolio was renamed "Economic Development and Trade".

In office, Palladini presented himself as a populist while presenting legislation which reduced government services. He was often accused of anti-intellectualism. When he cut back on snowplowing budgets for provincial highways, he suggested that stranded drivers could simply use their cell phones to call for help.

=== Cabinet posts ===
Harris ministry, Province of Ontario (1995–2002)
Cabinet posts (2)
Predecessor	Office	Successor
Bill Saunderson	Minister of Economic Development, Trade and Tourism; 1997–2001	Bob Runciman
Gilles Pouliot	Minister of Transportation; 1995–1997	Tony Clement

== Resignation and death ==
Palladini resigned from cabinet on February 7, 2001, citing personal difficulties. One month later, he unexpectedly died of a heart attack on a golf course while vacationing in Mexico.

== Legacy ==
His son Franco and family continued to operate his car dealership for several years until bankruptcy in 2009. There is a community centre named Al Palladini Community Centre in Woodbridge, in his honour.

Ontario's Minister of Energy, Stephen Lecce, gives Al Palladini credit for launching his political career through his effort on his 1999 re-election campaign.
