= Harry M. Beer =

Harry McWaters Beer (15 April 1913 – 23 March 1987) was a Canadian Quaker and Headmaster of Pickering College.

Beer was educated at Pickering College and served as French Master from 1938 to 1953 before becoming the school's longest-serving Headmaster from 1953 to 1978.

Beer championed the abolition of corporal punishment as a means of discipline to the Canadian Association of Independent Schools, which eventually outlawed caning and other physical punishments as a result. The practice was subsequently outlawed across Canada in 2004. Beer brought other pacifist ideals to Pickering College during his term as Headmaster, including human rights, social justice, end environmental concerns in the teaching curriculum.

He was brother-in-law of diplomat and academic John Wendell Holmes and father of politician Charles Beer.
