= Vaughan—King—Aurora (provincial electoral district) =

Former provincial electoral district in Ontario, Canada

Ontario electoral district

Defunct provincial electoral district
- Legislature: Legislative Assembly of Ontario
- District created: 1996
- District abolished: 2003
- First contested: 1999
- Last contested: 2003

Demographics
- Population (2001): 164,590
- Electors (2000): 98,805
- Area (km²): 494

Vaughan—King—Aurora was a provincial electoral riding in Ontario, Canada, that was represented in the Legislative Assembly of Ontario from 1999 to 2007.

== Provincial riding ==
The provincial riding of Vaughan—King—Aurora was created before the 1999 election when Ontario provincial electoral districts were redefined to be the same as the federal districts. Municipalities in this riding were previously in parts of York Centre (Vaughan) and York—Mackenzie (Newmarket, Aurora, King) ridings.

The riding was last held by Greg Sorbara, representing the Ontario Liberal Party in the Legislative Assembly of Ontario. Sorbara served as the Minister of Finance for the Cabinet of Ontario from 2003 to 2005, and from 2006 to 2007.

In 2007 the riding was abolished to match the boundaries of the federal ridings. The riding was redistributed into Newmarket—Aurora, Oak Ridges—Markham, and Vaughan ridings.

== Provincial election results ==
2003 Ontario general election
Party	Candidate	Votes	%	±%
Liberal	Greg Sorbara	36928	56.14	15.97
Progressive Conservative	Carmine Iacono	21744	33.06	-21.64
New Democratic	Mike Seaward	4697	7.14	4.22
Green	Adrian Visentin	2412	3.67	2.73

1999 Ontario general election
Party	Candidate	Votes	%
Progressive Conservative	Al Palladini	28836	54.7
Liberal	Tony Genco	21173	40.17
New Democratic	Michael Seaward	1539	2.92
Libertarian	John W. Genser	670	1.27
Green	Ernst von Bezold	495	0.94

== See also ==
- List of Ontario provincial electoral districts
- Canadian provincial electoral districts
