= Charles Beer =

Canadian politician

The Honourable Charles Beer ECO

Ontario MPP
- In office 1987–1995
- Preceded by: Greg Sorbara
- Succeeded by: Frank Klees
- Constituency: York North

More...

Personal details
- Born: November 24, 1941 (age 84) Toronto, Ontario
- Party: Liberal
- Education: University of Toronto; York University; Université Laval; National Defence College
- Occupation: Politician, public administrator

John Charles McWaters Beer (born November 24, 1941) is a former Canadian politician. He was a Liberal member of the Legislative Assembly of Ontario from 1987 to 1995 and served as a cabinet minister in the government of David Peterson.

== Background ==
Beer was born in Toronto. His parents were Harry M. Beer and Elizabeth Greenway Holmes. He was educated at the University of Toronto, York University, Université Laval and the National Defence College. He worked as an educator after graduating and was the Assistant Headmaster of Pickering College from 1981 to 1986. In 1987, he served as director of the Ontario Conference of Independent Schools.

== Politics ==
He ran for the Ontario legislature in the 1977 provincial election, but finished a distant third against Progressive Conservative Frank Drea in Scarborough Centre. He campaigned for the legislature again in the 1981 election, but lost to Progressive Conservative Margaret Birch in Scarborough East.

Beer was elected to the Ontario legislature on his third attempt, in the 1987 election in which the Liberal Party won a landslide majority. He defeated Progressive Conservative candidate John Cole by 5,185 votes in York North, located just north of Toronto. Beer was appointed a parliamentary assistant in 1988, and was promoted to Minister of Community and Social Services and Minister responsible for Francophone Affairs on August 2, 1989. In the former capacity, he started the Advisory Group on New Social Assistance Legislation in 1990.

The Liberals were defeated in the 1990 provincial election but Beer retained his seat beating Progressive Conservative candidate George Timpson by only 158 votes (Ontario New Democratic Party candidate Keith Munro was a close third). Peterson resigned as Liberal leader immediately after the election, and Beer ran to succeed him in the 1992 leadership election. He finished fourth, withdrawing from the contest after the third ballot.

Beer was on the left wing of the Liberal Party and played a significant role in developing the party's "Red Book" platform for the 1995 provincial campaign. The Progressive Conservatives won a majority government in this election, however, and Beer was among the Liberal incumbents defeated, losing to Frank Klees, later a cabinet minister in the government of Mike Harris, by almost 12,000 votes.

In 1996, he endorsed Gerard Kennedy's unsuccessful bid to become leader of the Ontario Liberal Party.

=== Cabinet positions ===
Peterson ministry, Province of Ontario (1985–1990)
Cabinet post (1)
Predecessor	Office	Successor
John Sweeney	Minister of Community and Social Services; 1989–1990; Also Responsible for Francophone Affairs	Zanana Akande

== Later life ==
In the late 1990s, Beer served as the president and Chief Executive Officer of the Canadian Executive Service Organization, a not-for-profit agency that transfers Canadian technical and managerial expertise to developing countries. He served as the executive assistant to George Smitherman, the Minister of Health and Long Term Care. In 2009, he was appointed to perform a review of Ontario Accessibility Act.
