= Royal Group Technologies =

Canadian building supplies and plastics producer

Royal Group Technologies is a large Canadian building supplies maker and plastics company. Based in Vaughan, Ontario, it also has operations in much of Latin America and in Poland and China. In the 2000s, it was plagued by scandals and financial losses.

== History ==
The company was founded as Royal Plastics Group in 1970 by Vittorio "Vic" De Zen. It quickly rose to become one of Canada's largest plastic makers, specializing in PVC pipe, window profiles, and other plastics products. It had its own chemical plant in Bradford, Ontario, and a large PVC recycling facility. The company developed the Royal Building System, a construction technique using PVC frames filled with concrete, that allows very sturdy structures to be constructed in only a few days. It also moved into other areas, such as lawn furniture. It also moved into metals with its Baron Metal subsidiary.

The company went public in 1994, and the stock rapidly increased and three years later De Zen's own holdings were worth $600 million. Because of generous stock options some 200 other employees became millionaires as well. In 1997, the company was renamed Royal Group Technologies as sale grew to $2 billion per year.

In 2003, investors began to complain about the company, which was seeing falling earnings. De Zen retained over 80% of the votes at shareholders meeting, and continued to pay himself a multimillion-dollar bonus. The stock price collapsed from over $30 to under $7 in little over a year. Losing money, it placed its money losing window coverings division under new management. In November 2003 De Zen resigned as CEO, being replaced by Douglas Dunsmuir. He remained chairman, and through his stock holdings control of the company. The stock recovered somewhat, increasing in value by over 70% over the next months.

However, in February 2004 the Ontario Securities Commission and RCMP announced that they were investigating the company in connection with land deals in the Caribbean. The stock again fell sharply. This caused problems for Greg Sorbara, a former Royal Group board member, who had become Ontario's finance minister in 2003. The investigation focused on De Zen, Dunsmuir and former CFO Gary Brown. It was alleged that the Royal Group has defrauded shareholders in its relation with a resort owned by the executives on the island of St. Kitts. De Zen and his brother in law, Fortunato Bordin, had borrowed $114 million from Scotiabank to build the resort. Scotiabank headquarters were raided by 25 members of the RCMP's Integrated Market Enforcement Team on 1 February 2005 "to collect documentary and other evidence in connection to the ongoing criminal investigation into the financial activities of Royal Group Technologies Ltd. "

In November 2004, forensic auditors found what was then regarded as a suspicious land deal in Canada in which De Zen and other executives had bought land and then resold it to the company. They found that a 75 hectare lot in Vaughan had been purchased for $20.5 million and then resold to Royal Group that same day for $27 million. The company fired De Zen as chairman, Dunsmuir, and new CFO Ron Goegan. James Sardo was appointed as the new CEO. The scandal also affected Scotiabank, the company's banker, which was subject to a high-profile RCMP raid in February 2005.

In March 2005, De Zen relinquished control over the company when he exchanged his multiple-voting shares for common stock. This left the company an attractive target for a takeover attempt. It was reported that Cerberus Capital Management was preparing a $1.3-billion bid for the firm. The company put itself up for sale in the spring of 2005.

Georgia Gulf Corporation, a large PVC raw-material manufacturer, completed its acquisition of Royal Group on October 3, 2006 for $1.6 billion.

The trial respecting the allegations made against Mr. De Zen and others commenced in April 2010. Crown prosecutors had sought a jury trial, but the Ontario Superior Court noted that "the Crown engaged in an "abuse of process"" and denied the request.

On December 10, 2010, at the conclusion of the five-month trial, the trial judge acquitted the defendants of the two charges they faced. The trial judge found overwhelming evidence supporting the defence that no fraud, no deceit, no dishonesty and no concealment had taken place. Indeed, the judge indicated that it would be a "travesty of justice" to wait even one day before pronouncing the verdict of not guilty.
