= 1992 Ontario Liberal Party leadership election =

Canadian provincial party election

- Date: February 7–9, 1992
- Convention: Copps Coliseum, Hamilton, Ontario
- Resigning leader: David Peterson
- Won by: Lyn McLeod
- Ballots: 5
- Candidates: 6
- Spending limit: $250,000

The Ontario Liberal Party leadership election, 1992, held on February 8–9, 1992 elected Lyn McLeod leader of the Ontario Liberal Party. McLeod replaced David Peterson who had resigned after the party lost the 1990 provincial election and he failed to retain his seat. McLeod won after five ballots against a field of five other candidates. She was the first woman to head a major political party in Ontario.

== Background ==
The leadership convention was held to replace David Peterson who resigned after the party lost the 1990 provincial election. Initially, Robert Nixon was appointed as interim leader but he resigned on July 31, 1991, to take a federal patronage position to conduct a review of Atomic Energy of Canada Limited. Murray Elston was then appointed interim leader, but he resigned when he announced his candidacy on November 18. Jim Bradley was appointed as the third interim leader, remaining in the post until the leadership convention. The leadership race officially began on November 7, 1991, 90 days before a convention, which was held on the weekend of February 7–9, 1992, in Hamilton, Ontario.

== Candidates ==
Six caucus members entered the race. They were Charles Beer, Murray Elston, Steve Mahoney, Lyn McLeod, David Ramsay, and Greg Sorbara. Mahoney was first off the mark when he officially announced his candidacy on November 7, 1991.

== Procedure ==
The party adopted a procedure to elect a leader that included elements of both direct elections and a leadership convention. Members who had been party members for at least 90 days would choose delegates for the convention. Delegates sent by each riding varied depending on their support for individual candidates. Each elected delegate was committed to vote for a particular candidate on the first ballot but was free to choose on subsequent ballots. The hybrid format was an effort to include local democracy but with the media attention that follows a traditional convention. A spending cap of $250,000 was placed for each candidate's expenses and $671,000 was budgeted for the convention weekend.

== Convention ==
Elston was defeated by McLeod by a slim margin of 9 votes out of a total 2,315 votes cast. McLeod was the first woman to lead a major party in Ontario.

In her acceptance speech she promised to balance the budget and defeat the New Democrats in the next election. After the convention, she revealed that she had spent $272,947 on her campaign, breaking the spending cap. Elston also admitted overspending with expenses totalling $305,815.

== Ballot results ==
= Eliminated from next round
= Winner

Candidate	1st Ballot		2nd Ballot		3rd Ballot		4th Ballot		5th Ballot (Note: There were 21 spoiled ballots on the final count.)	
Name	Votes	%	Votes	%	Votes	%	Votes	%	Votes	%
Murray Elston	740	30.2	767	31.8	865	35.6	988	41.6	1153	49.8
Lyn McLeod	667	27.2	744	30.9	873	35.9	1049	44.1	1162	50.2
Greg Sorbara	345	14.1	380	15.8	402	16.6	341	14.3	Released delegates	
Charles Beer	247	10.1	307	12.7	289	11.9	Released delegates			
Steve Mahoney	236	9.6	213	8.8	Supported McLeod					
David Ramsay	216	8.8	Released delegates							
Total	2451	100.0	2411	100.0	2429	100.0	2378	100.0	2315	100.0
