= Greg Sorbara =

Canadian politician

The Honourable Greg Sorbara ECO
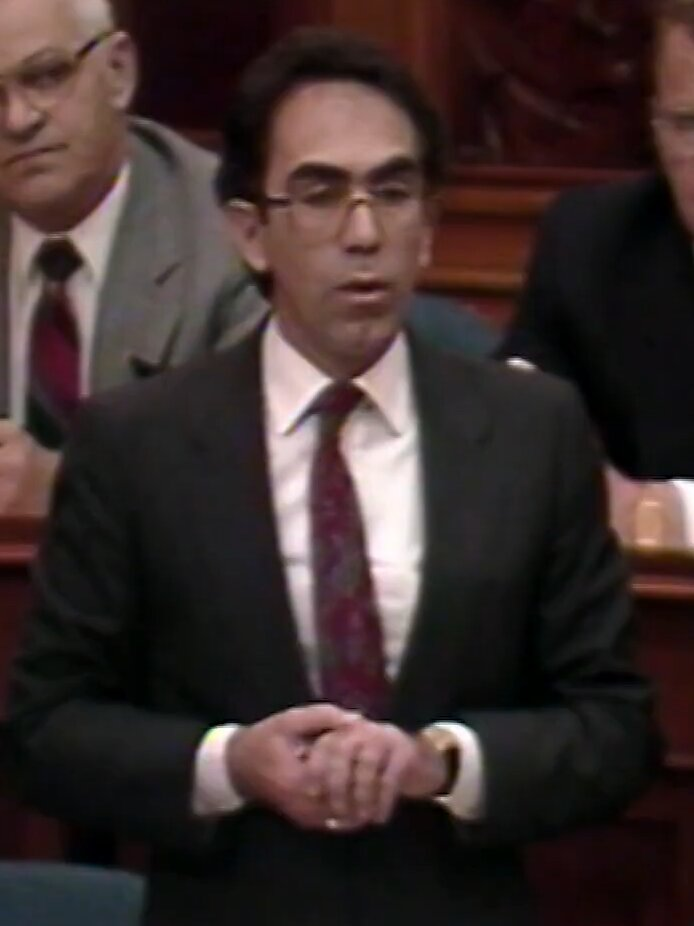
- Sorbara in 1986

Ontario Minister of Finance & Chair of the Management Board
- In office 2003–05, 2006–07
- Premier: Dalton McGuinty
- Preceded by: Janet Ecker
- Succeeded by: Dwight Duncan (and a.i. 2005–06)
Ontario ministerial offices
Premier	David Peterson
Minister of Colleges and Universities
In office 1985–1987
Preceded by	Larry Grossman
Succeeded by	Lyn McLeod
Minister of Skills Development
In office 1985–1987
Preceded by	Phil Gillies
Succeeded by	Alvin Curling
Minister of Labour
In office 1987–1989
Preceded by	Bill Wrye
Succeeded by	Gerry Phillips
Minister of Consumer and Commercial Relations
In office 1989–1990
Preceded by	Bill Wrye
Succeeded by	Peter Kormos

Member of Ontario Provincial Parliament
- In office 1985–95, 2001–12
Constituencies
In office 1985–87 (33rd Parliament)
Preceded by	William Hodgson
Succeeded by	Charles Beer
Constituency	York North
In office 1987–95 (34th, 35th)
Preceded by	Don Cousens
Succeeded by	Al Palladini
Constituency	York Centre
In office 2001–12 (37th to 40th)
Preceded by	Al Palladini
Succeeded by	Steven Del Duca
Constituency	Vaughan 2007–12; Vaughan—King—Aurora 2001–07

Ontario Liberal Party President
- In office 1999–2004
- Preceded by: Tim Murphy
- Succeeded by: Deb Matthews

Personal details
- Born: Gregory Samuel Sorbara; 4 September 1946 (age 80) Toronto, Ontario, Canada
- Party: Liberal
- Spouse: Kate Barlow
- Children: 6, including Martina
- Education: BA, LLB, LLD (hon)
- Alma mater: York University
- Profession: Lawyer, politician

Gregory Samuel Sorbara (born September 4, 1946) is a former politician in Ontario, Canada. He was a Liberal member of the Legislative Assembly of Ontario from 1985 to 1995, and again from 2001 to 2012 who represented ridings north of Toronto in the city of Vaughan. Sorbara served as a cabinet minister in the governments of David Peterson and Dalton McGuinty. He contested the Ontario Liberal leadership at its 1992 leadership convention, served as the party's president from 1999 to 2004, chaired the party's successful 2007 election campaign.

Sorbara relinquished all cabinet roles in 2007 and retired from the legislature for a second and final time in 2012. Following his retirement from electoral politics, Sorbara published his memoir, The Battlefield of Ontario Politics in 2014, and served as the chancellor of York University from 2014 to 2023. In recent years, he has been among the most prominent voices advocating for a merger of the Liberal and NDP in Ontario.

== Family life and legal career ==
Sorbara was born in Toronto, Ontario in 1946. His father, Sam Sorbara, immigrated to Canada from Italy in the 1920s.

Sorbara graduated from St. Michael's College School and attended University of Toronto for four years but left without graduating. Later, he completed his education at Glendon College in 1978 and Osgoode Hall Law School in 1981, both at York University, and practised law at Stikeman Elliott until 1984.

In 1967 he joined the Company of Young Canadians in Vancouver, where he met his future partner, Kate Barlow. His daughter Martina Sorbara is a singer-songwriter.

In 2017, Sorbara and family donated $5 million to the construction efforts of the Mackenzie Vaughan Hospital.

== Political career ==
=== Minister in Peterson ministry ===
In the 1985 provincial election Sorbara ran as the Liberal in the riding of York North, a suburban riding north of Toronto. He defeated Progressive Conservative (PC) incumbent William Hodgson by 4,100 votes. The Liberals under David Peterson were able to form a minority government after this election, and Sorbara was appointed Minister of Colleges and Universities and Minister of Skills Development on June 26, 1985.

Sorbara was re-elected in the redistributed riding of York Centre in the 1987 provincial election. On September 29, 1987, he became Minister of Labour with responsibility for Women's Issues. Following a cabinet shuffle in August 1989, he became Minister of Consumer and Commercial Relations.

The Liberals were upset by the New Democratic Party in the election which followed, though Sorbara won in his riding.

=== 1992 bid for Ontario Liberal leadership ===
On November 14, 1991, Sorbara announced that he was joining the race to replace Peterson as leader of the party. He stated, "We have to stop this province's slide into a low-wage, no-growth economy," and spoke of infrastructure investment.

At the convention held in Hamilton, Ontario on February 9, Sorbara finished third on the first ballot, and remained in this position until dropping from the race after the fourth ballot. Sorbara subsequently refused to support either Murray Elston or Lyn McLeod (the eventual winner) on the fifth and final ballot. and did not seek re-election in 1995.

Sorbara was the first Italian-Canadian to have sought the party leadership of any one of the three major parties in Ontario politics. He later acknowledged in his memoir that at the time there were parts of Ontario where being of Italian heritage made him not an unviable candidate. In 2020, his protégée Steven Del Duca became the first Italian-Canadian to be elected party leader for one of the major parties in Ontario.

=== Party presidency, return to elected office ===
Sorbara supported Dalton McGuinty's successful bid for the provincial party leadership at the 1996 leadership convention. He did not run in the 1999 provincial election, but was elected Party President in November 1999 as McGuinty's preferred candidate over former cabinet colleague Alvin Curling.

The Progressive Conservatives had swept every single seats in the seat-rich "905" area surrounding Toronto in the two preceding provincial elections. In 2001, Sorbara's successor as MPP for York North, PC cabinet minister Al Palladini, died unexpectedly. The subsequent byelection was viewed as a pivotal test of the Liberals' ability to crack the Conservative fortress in the subsequent election. Sorbara as party president personally contested and regained the seat, now named Vaughan—King—Aurora in the by-election, defeating Progressive Conservative candidate Joyce Frustaglio, a long time Vaughan city councillor, by almost 10,000 votes. The crack from the by-election correctly foretold the collapse of the fortress two years later.

=== Treasurer in the McGuinty ministry ===
The Liberals won the 2003 election, and Sorbara was appointed Minister of Finance in the Ontario Cabinet on October 23, 2003.

On May 18, 2004, Sorbara released the McGuinty government's first budget. The centrepiece was a controversial new Health Premium of $300 to $900, staggered according to income. This violated a key Liberal campaign pledge not to raise taxes, and gave the government an early reputation for breaking promises. The Liberals defended the premium by pointing to the previous government's hidden deficit, and McGuinty claimed he needed to break his campaign pledge on taxation to fulfill his promises on other fronts. This broken promise has created a lasting public relations difficulty for the Liberal Party.

The Ontario Health Premium also became a major issue in the early days of the 2004 federal election, called a week after the Ontario budget. Most believe that the controversy hampered Liberal Prime Minister Paul Martin's bid for re-election.

Also controversial was the elimination of coverage for health services not covered by the Canada Health Act including eye examinations and physical therapy. Other elements of the McGuinty government's first budget were a four-year plan to tackle the deficit left behind by the Conservatives, free immunization for children, investments in education and investments to lower waiting times for cancer care, cardiac care, joint replacement and MRI and CT scans.

On May 11, 2005, Sorbara delivered his second budget. The flagship of the budget was the "Reaching Higher" plan. Investing $6.2 billion over four years, the plan increased accessibility for low-income students with loans and grants while funding more enrollments, expanded medical school spaces, and invested in new faculty, graduate scholarships and research.

The budget also projected breaking a vow to balance the future 2007–08 budget. Sorbara instead aimed at balance in 2008–09.

Sorbara also moved to expand infrastructure spending by encouraging Ontario's large pension plans to invest in the construction of new roads, schools and hospitals. Specific projects in the budget included a 10-year expansion of the TTC and Go Transit, 15,000 new affordable housing units and improved border crossings. NDP leader Howard Hampton described this move as "privatization by stealth."

After a cabinet shuffle on June 29, 2005, Sorbara was also named as the Chair of the Management Board of Cabinet.

==== Investigations by securities regulator and police, interruption of cabinet tenure ====
Sorbara became involved in a conflict-of-interest controversy not long after his appointment. In late 2003, the Ontario Securities Commission informed Sorbara's office that Royal Group Technologies would be announcing they were under investigation by the OSC. As a former director of Royal Group, this placed Sorbara in a conflict of interest as he also oversaw the OSC. Sorbara could not consult the Premier concerning the conflict of interest as he was restricted by the province's Securities Act from informing anyone else of the impending announcement by the company. Royal Group did not announce the investigation for almost two months.

There were calls for Sorbara to resign after the controversy became public knowledge, but he was cleared of any wrongdoing by the provincial integrity commissioner in August 2004.

On October 11, 2005, the RCMP raided the offices of the Sorbara Group, his family's real estate development firm, as part of an investigation into the affairs of Royal Group Technologies. The police warrant stated that there were reasonable grounds to believe Sorbara and other former directors of Royal Group defrauded the company and shareholders when they bought land in Brampton that was owned by a subsidiary of the Sorbara Group. Sorbara initially resisted opposition calls for him to step down, but later resigned as Minister of Finance the same day.

He was reinstated on May 23, 2006, after a judge ruled that there was no cause for including Sorbara's name on the relevant search warrant.

=== Re-elections, resignation from cabinet ===
Sorbara was re-elected to the Legislature in the 2007 election, while chairing the party's successful re-election campaign. Subsequently, on October 26, 2007, he announced that he no longer wanted to sit in Cabinet, citing he wanted to devote more time for his constituents and his family. He continued to serve in the legislature and was re-elected one last time in 2011, again while the party's campaign chair (with future Premier Kathleen Wynne as vice-chair).

Sorbara delivered a statement in May 2010, supporting the minority Muslim sect, Ahmadiyya, who were recently attacked in Lahore for practicing their faith.

On August 1, 2012, Sorbara announced that he was retiring from the legislature but would stay on as chair of the Liberal's election campaign. He was succeeded by his protégée and future party leader Steven Del Duca.

== Post retirement from legislature ==
=== Liberal Politics ===
At the 2013 Ontario Liberal Leadership convention, Sorbara played a crucial role in advising Eric Hoskins, the first contestant to be eliminated, to throw his support behind Kathleen Wynne, despite publicly undertook to remain neutral in the contest. In the 2023 leadership contest, he endorsed Kingston MPP Ted Hsu.

Sobara's autobiography, The Battlefield of Ontario Politics, was released on November 1, 2014.

=== Alma mater ===
York University, Sorbara's alma mater, conferred an honorary doctor of laws degree on Sorbara in June 2013, and further awarded the 2013 Hennick Medal for Career Achievement to Sorbara in October that year.

Sorbara served as the chancellor of York University from June 2014 to May 2023. He succeeded another prominent Ontario cabinet minister Roy McMurtry, and was succeeded by Kathleen Taylor, the inaugural honoree of the Hennick Medal.

== Offices Held ==
Legislative Assembly of Ontario
Preceded by William Hodgson	MPP for York Centre; 1987–95	Succeeded by Charles Beer
Preceded by Don Cousens	MPP for York North; 1985–87	Succeeded by Al Palladini
Preceded by Al Palladini	MPP for Vaughan—King—Aurora/Vaughan; 2001–12	Succeeded by Steven Del Duca
Peterson ministry, Province of Ontario (1985–1990)
Preceded by Larry Grossman	Minister of Colleges and Universities; 1985–1987	Succeeded by Lyn McLeod
Preceded by Phil Gillies	Minister of Skills Development; 1985–1987	Succeeded by Alvin Curling
Preceded by Bill Wrye	Minister of Labour; 1987–1989	Succeeded by Gerry Phillips
Preceded by Bill Wrye	Minister of Consumer & Commercial Relations; 1989–1990	Succeeded by Peter Kormos
McGuinty ministry, Province of Ontario (2003–2013)
Preceded by Janet Ecker	Minister of Finance; 2003–05; 2006–07	Succeeded by Dwight Duncan
Preceded by Dwight Duncan	Minister of Finance; 2003–05; 2006–07	Succeeded by Dwight Duncan
Preceded by Gerry Phillips	Chair of the Management Board of Cabinet; 2003–05; 2006–07	Succeeded by Dwight Duncan
Preceded by Dwight Duncan	Chair of the Management Board of Cabinet; 2003–05; 2006–07	Succeeded by Dwight Duncan
Party political offices
Preceded by Tim Murphy	Ontario Liberal Party President; 1999–2004	Succeeded by Deb Matthews
Academic offices
Preceded by Roy McMurtry	Chancellor of York University; 2014–23	Succeeded by Kathleen Taylor

== Electoral record ==
2003 Ontario general election
Party	Candidate	Votes	%	±%
Liberal	Greg Sorbara	36,928	56.14	15.97
Progressive Conservative	Carmine Iacono	21,744	33.06	-21.64
New Democratic	Mike Seaward	4,697	7.14	4.22
Green	Adrian Visentin	2,412	3.67	2.73

2007 Ontario general election
Party	Candidate	Votes	%	±%
Liberal	Greg Sorbara	28,961	61.9	5.76
Progressive Conservative	Gayani Weerasinghe	8,773	18.8	-14.26
New Democratic	Rick Morelli	5,417	11.6	4.46
Green	Russell Korus	2,978	6.4	2.73
Independent	Savino Quatela	624	1.3	

2011 Ontario general election
Party	Candidate	Votes	%	±%
Liberal	Greg Sorbara	26,176	53.02	-8.7
Progressive Conservative	Tony Genco	15,409	31.21	12.41
New Democratic	Paul Donofrio	5,584	11.31	-2.9
Libertarian	Paolo Fabrizio	934	1.89	
Green	Brendan Frye	695	1.41	-4.99
