= Murray Elston =

Canadian politician

The Honourable Murray Elston ECO
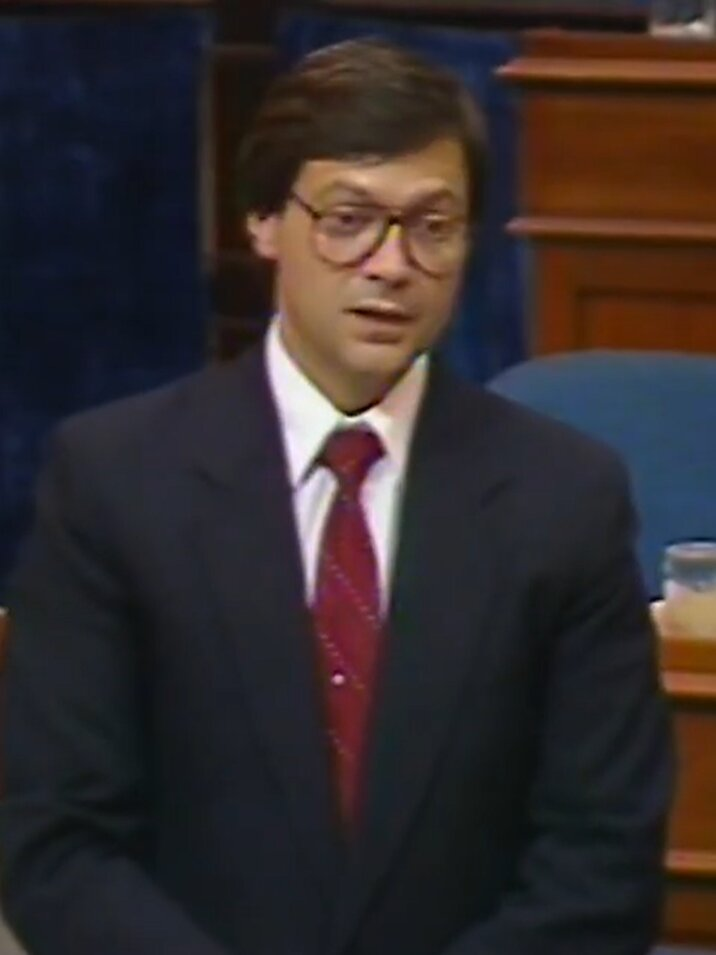
- Elston in 1986

Ontario MPP
- In office 1987–1994
- Preceded by: Riding established
- Succeeded by: Barb Fisher
- Constituency: Bruce
- In office 1981–1987
- Preceded by: Murray Gaunt
- Succeeded by: Riding abolished
- Constituency: Huron—Bruce

Personal details
- Born: Murray John Elston; October 8, 1949 (age 76) Wingham, Ontario, Canada
- Party: Liberal
- Profession: Lawyer

Murray John Elston (born October 8, 1949) is a former politician in Ontario Canada. He was a Liberal member of the Legislative Assembly of Ontario from 1981 to 1994 who represented the central Ontario ridings of Huron—Bruce and Bruce. He was a senior cabinet minister in the government of David Peterson. He briefly served as interim leader of the Liberal Party from July to November 1991.

== Background ==
Elston was educated at the University of Western Ontario, receiving a Bachelor of Arts degree and a law degree. He practised law, working for the firm of Crawford, Mill Davies & Elston.

== Politics ==
Elston was elected to the Ontario legislature in the 1981 provincial election defeating Progressive Conservative Gary Harron by 224 votes in the rural, southwestern constituency of Huron—Bruce. The Progressive Conservatives won a majority government under Bill Davis in this election, and Elston sat on the opposition benches for the next four years.

He was re-elected in the 1985 election. After the Miller government failed on a vote of no confidence, The Liberals formed a minority government with the support of the New Democratic Party and Elston was appointed to the high-profile position of Minister of Health. In this role, he was at the centre of the government's fight against extra-billing by doctors, an issue the government won after withstanding the province's first doctors' strike. Elston was at the forefront of the Canadian government's response to the AIDS crisis from 1985. Elston also announced subsidies for residents of Northern Ontario who needed to travel south for medical care.

The Liberals were re-elected with a landslide majority in the 1987 provincial election, and Elston was returned by a significant majority in the redistributed riding of Bruce. In the cabinet shuffle that followed on September 29, 1987, Elston was appointed Chair of the Management Board of Cabinet. He was also appointed Minister of Financial Institutions on August 16, 1988.

In the 1990 Ontario election, the Liberals were defeated by the New Democratic Party under Bob Rae. Many high-profile Liberals lost their seats, though Elston was returned in Bruce by a comfortable if reduced margin. Peterson, who had lost his own seat on election night, resigned immediately as party leader.

=== Cabinet positions ===
Peterson ministry, Province of Ontario (1985–1990)
Cabinet post (1)
Predecessor	Office	Successor
Robert Nixon	Minister of Financial Institutions; 1988–1990	Peter Kormos
Philip Andrewes	Minister of Health; 1985–1987	Elinor Caplan
Special Cabinet Responsibilities
Predecessor	Title	Successor
Robert Nixon	Chair of Management Board; 1987–1990	Frances Lankin
Special Parliamentary Responsibilities
Predecessor	Title	Successor
Robert Nixon	Leader of the Opposition; 1991; Also Interim Liberal Party Leader	Jim Bradley

=== Interim leader and convention ===
The Liberals initially chose Robert Nixon as their interim leader, but he resigned on July 31, 1991, to accept a federal appointment. Elston was then chosen as interim leader in Nixon's place, though his time in this position was brief. He declared himself a candidate in the race to become the party's permanent leader, and accordingly resigned as interim leader on November 19, 1991. Jim Bradley took his place until the leadership convention.

Elston quickly became the favourite to win the 1992 race, gaining endorsements from such high-profile figures as Peterson, Ian Scott, and Sheila Copps. He led voting for the first four ballots, but lost to Lyn McLeod on the fifth and final ballot by only nine votes. The number of spoiled ballots from supporters of third-place candidate Greg Sorbara was greater than McLeod's margin of victory. Some political observers speculated that Elston appeared too much like a holdover from the Peterson era, at a time when the Liberal Party wanted to present a new image to voters.

=== Opposition ===
Elston remained in the legislature for two more years, and served as Opposition House Leader before resigning as an MPP on October 31, 1994, to enter the private sector. He was touted as McLeod's likely replacement when she resigned as Liberal leader following a poor performance in the 1995 provincial election but he declined to enter the race preferring to remain out of politics. In 1996, he was the most prominent supporter of Dalton McGuinty's ultimately successful bid to win the party's leadership.

== After politics ==
From November 1994 until 1997, Elston was president of the Ontario Interlink Industrial Park. From January to October 1998, he worked for Engergreen Solutions Group. In November 1998, Elston was appointed president of Canada's Research-Based Pharmaceutical Companies (Rx&D).

From 2004 to 2009, Elston was president of the Canadian Nuclear Association, in order to lobby the Premier's office on behalf of the nuclear industry. As a former Liberal MPP, he had represented the riding of Huron-Bruce, which is home to the Bruce Nuclear Generating Station. Elston's lobbying was highly successful: on June 13, 2006, the McGuinty government announced its commitment to rebuild all of Ontario's ageing nuclear stations as well as the construction of new reactors. He served as vice-president of corporate affairs for Bruce Power from 2009 until 2011.
