= Bill Wrye =

Canadian politician (born 1944)

The Honourable Bill Wrye ECO
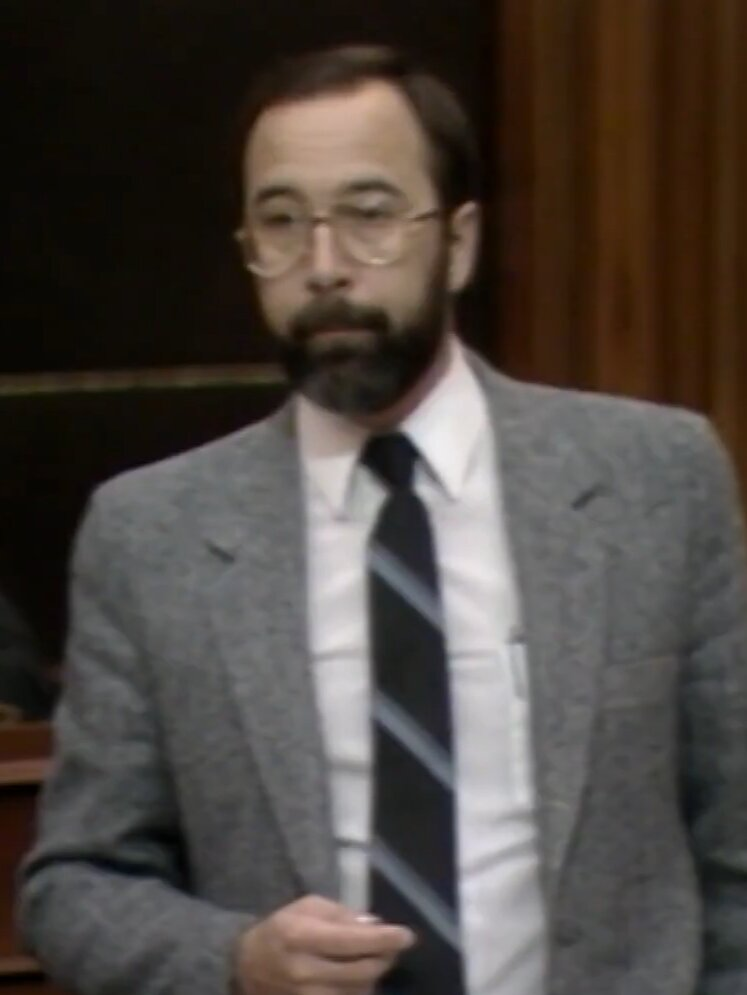
- Wrye in 1986

Ontario MPP
- In office 1981–1990
- Preceded by: Ted Bounsall
- Succeeded by: George Dadamo
- Constituency: Windsor—Sandwich

Personal details
- Born: December 25, 1944 (age 81) Regina, Saskatchewan, Canada
- Party: Liberal
- Occupation: Television producer

William Munro Wrye (born December 25, 1944) is a former Canadian politician in Ontario, Canada. He served in the Legislative Assembly of Ontario as a Liberal from 1981 to 1990, and was a cabinet minister in the government of David Peterson.

== Background ==
Wrye was educated at the Ryerson Polytechnical Institute in Toronto, and worked as a television producer for CBC before entering political life.

== Politics ==
In the 1981 provincial election he was elected to the Ontario legislature defeating incumbent New Democrat Ted Bounsall by 134 votes in the constituency of Windsor—Sandwich. He was re-elected by a greater margin in the 1985 election.

After serving in opposition for two years, the Ontario Liberal Party formed a minority government following the 1985 election. Wrye, who represented a large working-class constituency, was appointed Minister of Labour on June 26, 1985. As Labour Minister, Wrye brought forward legislation providing automatic yearly adjustments of workers-compensation benefits to the consumer price index.

He defeated George Dadamo of the NDP by 2,353 votes in the 1987 election, and was named Minister of Consumer and Commercial Relations on September 29, 1987. After a cabinet shuffle on August 2, 1989, he was named Minister of Transportation.

The Liberals were defeated by the NDP in the 1990 provincial election, and Wrye lost his seat to George Dadamo by over 4,000 votes.

=== Peterson cabinet ===
Peterson ministry, Province of Ontario (1985–1990)
Cabinet posts (3)
Predecessor	Office	Successor
Ed Fulton	Minister of Transportation; 1989–1990	Ed Philip
Monte Kwinter	Minister of Consumer and Commercial Relations; 1987–1989	Greg Sorbara
Robert Elgie	Minister of Labour; 1985–1987	Greg Sorbara

== Later life ==
Wrye has recently served with the Windsor-Essex County branch of the Canadian Mental Health Association.

Wrye was a party delegate supporting Dwight Duncan at the Liberal Party's 1996 leadership convention. After Duncan's elimination, he shifted his allegiance to Gerard Kennedy (Windsor Star, December 3, 1996). In 2003, Wrye was named as executive assistant to Duncan, who was by this time the government house leader and Liberal Member of Provincial Parliament for Windsor—St. Clair. Ironically, Duncan had once been a member of Wrye's staff.
