= Dwight Duncan =

Canadian politician (born 1959)

The Honourable Dwight Duncan ECO

9th Deputy Premier of Ontario
- In office 2011–2013
- Premier: Dalton McGuinty
- Preceded by: George Smitherman
- Succeeded by: Deb Matthews

Ontario MPP
- In office 1995–2013
- Preceded by: Wayne Lessard
- Succeeded by: Percy Hatfield
- Constituency: Windsor—Tecumseh; Windsor—St. Clair (1999–2007); Windsor—Walkerville (1995–1999)

Personal details
- Born: 3 January 1959 (age 67) Windsor, Ontario, Canada
- Party: Liberal

Dwight Duncan ECO (born 3 January 1959) is a former Canadian politician. He was a Liberal member of the Legislative Assembly of Ontario from 1995 to 2013 who represented ridings of Windsor—Walkerville, Windsor—St. Clair and Windsor—Tecumseh. He was a senior member of the government of Dalton McGuinty, serving in several cabinet roles, including Deputy Premier and Minister of Finance.

== Background ==
Duncan was born in Windsor, and attended high school at Assumption College School. He earned his bachelor's degree in economics from McGill University and a Master of Business Administration from the University of Windsor. He has been a member of the Liberal Party since the early 1970s, and skipped class in 1972 to attend a rally for his political hero, Prime Minister Pierre Trudeau.

Duncan's first full-time job after graduating from university was in the office of federal Liberal Member of Parliament (MP) Herb Gray. He later worked for provincial Labour Minister Bill Wrye between 1985 and 1987. Duncan was Administrator of Brentwood Recovery Centre, Canada's largest alcohol and drug rehabilitation centre, between 1987 and 1995. He also served on Windsor City Council from 1988 until 1994, when he chose not to seek re-election in order to prepare for his first provincial campaign.

== Opposition member ==
Duncan was first elected to the Ontario legislature in the 1995 provincial election, defeating New Democratic Party incumbent Wayne Lessard by 380 votes in Windsor—Walkerville. The Progressive Conservative Party won a majority government in this election, and Duncan became a member of the official opposition. Between 1995 and 1999, he served as his party's critic for Labour, Privatization, Housing, Transportation, and the Workers Compensation Board.

Duncan became a candidate for the Ontario Liberal Party leadership following the resignation of Lyn McLeod in 1996. His campaign plan combined a cautious fiscal strategy with plans for increased investment in health and education, and his leading supporters included Sean Conway, Tim Murphy and Mike Colle. He finished third on the first and second ballots at the party's 1996 leadership convention, but was eliminated after falling to fourth place behind Dalton McGuinty on the third. Duncan then endorsed Gerard Kennedy, who lost to McGuinty on the fifth ballot.

Duncan's 1995 opponent, Wayne Lessard, won a by-election for a different Windsor constituency in 1997. For the 1999 provincial election, redistribution forced the two MPPs to face one other a second time in Windsor—St. Clair. Duncan was again successful, defeating Lessard by over 4,000 votes. The Progressive Conservatives won a second majority government, and Duncan became opposition House Leader on 25 June 1999. He also served as Liberal Party critic for Municipal Affairs and the Management Board of Cabinet over the next four years.

== Cabinet minister ==
The Liberals won a majority government in the 2003 provincial election. Duncan was appointed Minister of Energy and Government House Leader on 23 October 2003.

=== Minister of Energy (first time) ===
One of Duncan's primary responsibilities as Energy Minister was managing Ontario Power Generation, which was in an extremely troubled state when the Liberals assumed power in 2003. A damning report into systemic mismanagement at OPG was issued shortly after the new government assumed power, and several high-level executives were forced to submit their resignations. Duncan appointed a new interim board led by former federal Minister of Energy, Mines and Resources Jake Epp to lead the organization's renewal.

Duncan subsequently announced plans for a comprehensive audit of OPG, when its budgetary shortfall was found to be $850 million. Reports in early 2004 indicated that Tory advisers with close ties to Mike Harris and Ernie Eves had received untendered contracts worth $5.6 million in 1999, when the Progressive Conservatives were still in government. The OPG's situation improved under its new management, and it was able to post a $42 million profit in 2005.

Duncan issued a strategic report from the Electricity Conservation and Supply Task Force in January 2004. The report called for Ontario to emphasize energy conservation, while also ensuring "reliability, diversity and affordability", and consumer protection. Two months later, Duncan brought forward a conservation plan highlighted by the use of "smart" electricity meters to discourage overuse during peak hours. The government plans to have smart meters installed throughout the province by 2010.

In April 2004, Duncan announced the creation of a new body called the Ontario Power Authority to purchase energy for the province and plan its long-term energy strategy. Duncan argued that the body would "depoliticize" energy debates in Ontario. Most energy companies supported this decision, while a number of environmental groups criticized it. The Globe and Mail raised concerns over the authority's expanding budget in late 2006, but Duncan argued that its expenses are necessary to create a planning regime for the future.

Hydro rates increased twice during Duncan's first tenure as Energy Minister. The Liberal Party had campaigned on a pledge to keep energy rates frozen until 2006, but reconsidered their options after discovering a $5.6 billion deficit left by the previous government. Homeowners and small business owners were paying 4.3 cents per kilowatt hour of hydro energy in 2003, even though the market rate was close to six cents. Premier McGuinty described this situation as "completely unsustainable" in light of the deficit, and Duncan announced that the rate would increase to 4.7 cents per kilowatt on 1 April 2004. In an effort to promote conservation, usage above 750 kilowatt hours was priced at 5.5 cents. Rates were increased a second time in March 2005, to 5 cents and 5.8 cents beyond 750 kilowatt hours. In making the change, Duncan acknowledged that his party had erred in its initial support for a freeze.

Duncan was also forced to revise his government's plans to shut down all of Ontario's coal-burning generators by 2007. In 2004, he acknowledged that "one or two" generators would be required as backup in the event of a failure elsewhere in the system. In June 2005, Duncan announced that the Nanticoke coal plant would remain open past 2007. He later announced that the Lambton station would remain open as well. A 2006 government report recommended keeping some plants open until 2014. In November 2006, the McGuinty government asked the provincial power authority to create a new timetable for plant closure. Duncan has said that Ontario will reduce its coal consumption in the coming years, even if plants remain open.

In April 2005, Duncan granted approval for four private companies to create new energy projects to replace the coal plants. The firms are expected to generate 1,675 megawatts of electricity.

In a speech to the Canadian Club on 2 May 2005, Duncan announced that it was time for an "open and public debate" on the future of nuclear power. He instructed the Ontario Power Authority to begin developing a long term electricity plan – referred to as an Integrated Power System Plan – so that the government could "move forward judiciously when it comes to nuclear energy in Ontario."

Shortly after assuming office, he cancelled the previous government's plans to privatize the Nuclear Inspection Services Division of Ontario Power Generation.

In July 2004, based on a recommendation of the OPG Review Committee, which Duncan appointed to review the cost over-runs and delays plaguing the restart of the four reactors at the Pickering Nuclear Generating Station, Duncan announced the government would proceed with the restart of reactor one at the Pickering station. Although smaller, the restart project still underwent cost over-runs and delays. As a result, the McGuinty government announced that it would not proceed with the restart of the two remaining Pickering A reactors and permanently mothballed them.

In 2005, Duncan concluded a deal with Bruce Power to provide the province with nuclear energy at a cost above the market rate. In 2007, the provincial Auditor-General later criticized this deal as too costly. Duncan has maintained that it was a good policy decision, and argued that much of the financial risk had been transferred to the private sector.

Duncan also promoted green energy initiatives such as the Deep lake water cooling project, wherein water from Lake Ontario is used to provide energy to buildings in Toronto. In 2005, he called for Ontario companies to bid for the right to produce an additional 1,000 megawatts of electricity from renewable sources. The province plans to have 10% of its energy come from renewable sources by 2010.

Duncan has proposed a national power grid to provide Canada with more autonomy in determining its energy policies. He outlined his support for the policy in a speech before power company executives in Toronto in February 2007, arguing that the grid would significantly reduce Canada's rate of greenhouse gas emissions. Premier Gary Doer is also a prominent supporter of this plan.

==== Government House Leader ====
Shortly after the 2003 election, Duncan was required to enter into discussions on the legislative status of the New Democratic Party. The NDP won seven seats in the election, one fewer than the number required for official party status in the legislature. Recognized parties receive $2 million in government funding and have guaranteed speaking time. The NDP requested that the rules be changed, arguing that they should receive official status to reflect the 15% popular vote they received. Duncan and McGuinty initially refused to consider this possibility. Duncan offered to provide the NDP with $420,000 and some guaranteed speaking time, but NDP leader Howard Hampton rejected this as "nothing short of a bribe" After an extended filibustering campaign by the New Democrats, a compromise was reached wherein the NDP received $775,000 and was permitted to take part in Question Period. The NDP later regained full party status after winning an eighth seat in a by-election.

=== Minister of Finance ===
Ontario Finance Minister Greg Sorbara unexpectedly resigned from office on 11 October 2005, after he was named on a Royal Canadian Mounted Police warrant issued in an investigation of his former real estate development firm. Later in the same day, Duncan was appointed to replace Sorbara as Minister of Finance and Chair of the Management Board of Cabinet.

Duncan's first budget was introduced on 23 March 2006. It focused on infrastructure spending, and particularly new spending on public transit projects in the Greater Toronto Area including extension of the Yonge-University-Spadina subway line, and roads and bridges in other parts of the province. Health spending increased by $1.9 billion, and Ontario's universities were given $290 million more in operating revenue. The budget deficit was $2.4 billion, consistent with the previous year's projection. There were no new taxes or tax increases. One month later, the federal government announced that it would provide Ontario with a further $1 billion for public transit spending in Toronto.

=== Minister of Energy (second time) ===
Greg Sorbara's returned to cabinet as Minister of Finance on 23 May 2006, after a judge ruled that there was no cause for including his name on the RCMP search warrant. Duncan was reassigned as Energy Minister.

Duncan announced his government's long-term strategic energy plan in June 2006, calling for an increased investment in nuclear power and the construction of two new reactors in the next ten years. The government will also promote a series of wind energy and conservation projects, including a plan to build dozens of windmills by 2025. The total cost is estimated at $46 billion over roughly twenty years. In November 2006, Duncan opened Canada's largest wind farm near Sault Ste. Marie.

In July 2006, Duncan directed the Ontario Power Authority to provide $400 million over three years to assist local electricity distribution utilities in conservation and demand-side management projects. Toronto Hydro responded almost immediately by promising a fee reduction for consumers who cut their electricity usage by 10%. The project was successful, and Duncan announced in November 2006 that Toronto Hydro's conservation measures would be expanded across the province.

The financial situation at Ontario Power Generation has improved significantly since 2003. Its profits for 2005 were $366 million, and its credit rating was upgraded. In July 2006, Duncan described OPG's turnaround as "[o]ne of the untold stories of the last two years". He also indicates that his government has added 3,000 megawatts of power to the provincial grid.

In October 2006, the Ontario Energy Board reduced the price of energy from 5.8 cents to 5.5 cents per kilowatt-hour, and from 6.7 cents to 6.4 above the 1,000 kilowatt-hour threshold. There was a further reduction to 5.3% and 6.2% in April 2007.

As in October 2006, the Ontario Power Authority signed contracts with seven high-efficiency co-generation projects across Ontario, with combined capacity of 414 megawatts. All of the plants are expected to come online by May 2010.

In November 2006, Duncan announced that the governments of Ontario and Quebec had agreed to join their power grids, to reduce Ontario's dependence on American power when demand exceeds capacity. The arrangement will see Ontario receive an additional 1,250 megawatts by 2010. Duncan is also attempting to finalize a deal with Manitoba, which has an abundance of hydroelectric power.

Tom Parkinson, the chair of Ontario Hydro One, resigned in December 2006 after accusations of lavish overspending. The following month, Duncan established a four-member panel to recommend a new system of compensation for energy executives. He said that the review would help reduce bureaucratic waste. Critics have argued that the panel is too expensive, and unnecessary.

In February 2007, Duncan said that Ontario is on target for meeting its Kyoto Protocol targets and that the province has achieved a 29% reduction in greenhouse-gas emissions from its coal plants since 2003. Opposition parties have argued that these reduced figures reflect a decline in the manufacturing sector, a charge that Duncan has rejected. In April, Duncan said that the province would not spend $1.6 billion to clean up the existing coal plants, arguing that the proposal was too expensive, would do nothing to benefit the environment, and was unnecessary given that the government still plans to phase out the coal plants by 2014.

Also in April 2007, Duncan announced that Ontario would ban the sale of inefficient incandescent light bulbs by 2012. The decision makes Ontario the first jurisdiction in Canada, and one of the first in the world, to take this step. In the same month, Duncan announced that a California company would construct the largest solar farm in Ontario, near Sarnia.

=== Retirement from provincial politics ===
Despite media speculation pegging him as the frontrunner in the 2013 Liberal leadership election, Duncan decided not to run to succeed Dalton McGuinty as Liberal leader and Premier and announced that he would leave politics entirely. He resigned from the legislature effective 14 February 2013 in order to accept a job as a Senior Strategic Advisor at McMillan LLP, a Bay Street law firm.

On 1 January 2016, Duncan was appointed to be the interim chair of the Board of the Windsor-Detroit Bridge Authority (Gordie Howe International Bridge). On 14 December 2016, he was appointed to a five-year term as the Board's permanent chair. In 2025, Duncan was appointed as the Chancellor of the University of Windsor.

== Federal politics ==
Duncan supported Paul Martin's bid to succeed Jean Chrétien as leader of the Liberal Party of Canada during the 1990s and early 2000s. He acted as Ontario co-chair of Michael Ignatieff's bid to become leader of the federal party in 2006. Duncan supported Justin Trudeau's candidacy for the leadership of the Liberal Party of Canada. He endorsed Mark Carney in the 2025 Liberal Party of Canada leadership election.

== Electoral record ==
2011 Ontario general election
Party	Candidate	Votes	%	±%
Liberal	Dwight Duncan	15,946	42.9	-6.8
New Democratic	Andrew McAvoy	12,175	32.8	+8.5
Progressive Conservative	Robert de Verteuil	7,749	20.8	+4.2
Green	Justin Levesque	829	2.2	-5.2
Libertarian	Dan Dominato	479	1.3	
Total valid votes		37,178	100.00	

2007 Ontario general election
Party	Candidate	Votes	%	±%
Liberal	Dwight Duncan	17,241	49.7	-5.22%
New Democratic	Helmi Charif	8,433	24.3	-4.8%
Progressive Conservative	Kristine Robinson	5,737	16.6	+4.99%
Green	Andrew McAvoy	2,549	7.4	+3.73%
Family Coalition	John Curtin	711	2.1	

2003 Ontario general election: Windsor—St. Clair
Party	Candidate	Votes	%	Expenditures
Liberal	Dwight Duncan	19,692	54.92	$70,054.29
New Democratic	Madeline Crnec	10,433	29.10	$34,049.02
Progressive Conservative	Matt Bufton	4,162	11.61	$18,124.00
Green	Chris Holt	1,315	3.67	$4,871.71
Independent Renewal	Saroj Bains	253	0.71	$0.00
Total valid votes		35,855	100.00	
Rejected, unmarked and declined ballots		302		
Turnout		36,157	47.81	
Electors on the lists		75,623		

1999 Ontario general election: Windsor—St. Clair
Party	Candidate	Votes	%	Expenditures
Liberal	Dwight Duncan	17,383	45.09	$69,840.80
New Democratic	Wayne Lessard	13,171	34.16	$31,781.20
Progressive Conservative	Michael Rohrer	7,241	18.78	$35,852.00
Green	Darren J. Brown	339	0.88	$0.00
Independent	Ralph Kirchner	263	0.68	$173.20
Natural Law	Janet Shorten	159	0.41	$0.00
Total valid votes		38,556	100.00	
Rejected, unmarked and declined ballots		243		
Turnout		38,799	52.46	
Electors on the lists		73,956		

1995 Ontario general election: Windsor—Walkerville
Party	Candidate	Votes	%	Expenditures
Liberal	Dwight Duncan	10,281	41.28	$45,522.32
New Democratic	Wayne Lessard	9,901	39.76	$45,615.07
Progressive Conservative	Michael Rohrer	3,610	14.50	$17,463.00
Family Coalition	Donna Halliday	957	3.84	$1,806.70
Natural Law	Vivek Narula	156	0.63	$0.00
Total valid votes		24,905	100.00	
Rejected, unmarked and declined ballots		387		
Turnout		25,292	52.54	
Turnout		48,141		

1991 Windsor municipal election: Council, Ward One (two members elected)
Candidate	Votes	%
(x)Dwight Duncan	8,438	36.95
Margaret Williams	6,288	27.54
Al Santing	3,285	14.39
Karen Bennett	1,905	8.34
Rick Cian	1,905	8.34
Joseph Theriault	1,014	4.44
Total Valid Votes	22,835	100.00

Provisional results taken from the Windsor Star newspaper, 13 November 1991. The revised final totals were not significantly different. Electors were permitted to vote for two candidates.

1988 Windsor municipal election: Council, Ward One (two members elected)
Candidate	Votes	%
(x)Mike Hurst	10,404	44.89
Dwight Duncan	5,976	25.79
Bob Girard	5,898	25.45
Gerald Johnson	897	3.87
Total Valid Votes	23,175	100.00

Provisional results taken from the Windsor Star newspaper, 15 November 1988. The revised final totals were not significantly different. Electors were permitted to vote for two candidates.

All provincial electoral information is taken from Elections Ontario. The expenditure entries for all elections after 1995 are taken from official candidate reports as listed by Elections Ontario. The figures cited are the Total Candidate's Campaign Expenses Subject to Limitation, and include transfers from constituency associations.

McGuinty ministry, Province of Ontario (2003–2013)
Cabinet posts (6)
Predecessor	Office	Successor
Greg Sorbara	Minister of Finance; 2007–2013	Charles Sousa
Harinder Takhar	Minister of Government Services; 2012–2013	Harinder Takhar
Monique Smith	Minister of Revenue; 2008–2009	John Wilkinson
Donna Cansfield	Minister of Energy; 2006–2007	Gerry Phillips
Greg Sorbara	Minister of Finance; 2005–2006	Greg Sorbara
John Baird	Minister of Energy; 2003–2005	Donna Cansfield
Special Cabinet Responsibilities
Predecessor	Title	Successor
Greg Sorbara	Chair of the Management Board of Cabinet; 2007–2013	Charles Sousa
Greg Sorbara	Chair of the Management Board of Cabinet; 2005–2006	Greg Sorbara
Special Parliamentary Responsibilities
Predecessor	Title	Successor
John Baird	Leader of the Government in the Ontario Legislature; 2003–2005	Jim Bradley
Political offices
Preceded by Donna Champagne	Windsor City Councillor, Ward One; 1988–1994; Served alongside: Mike Hurst; Margaret Williams	Succeeded by Dan Allen
