= Dalton McGuinty =

Premier of Ontario from 2003 to 2013

The Honourable Dalton McGuinty OOnt ECO
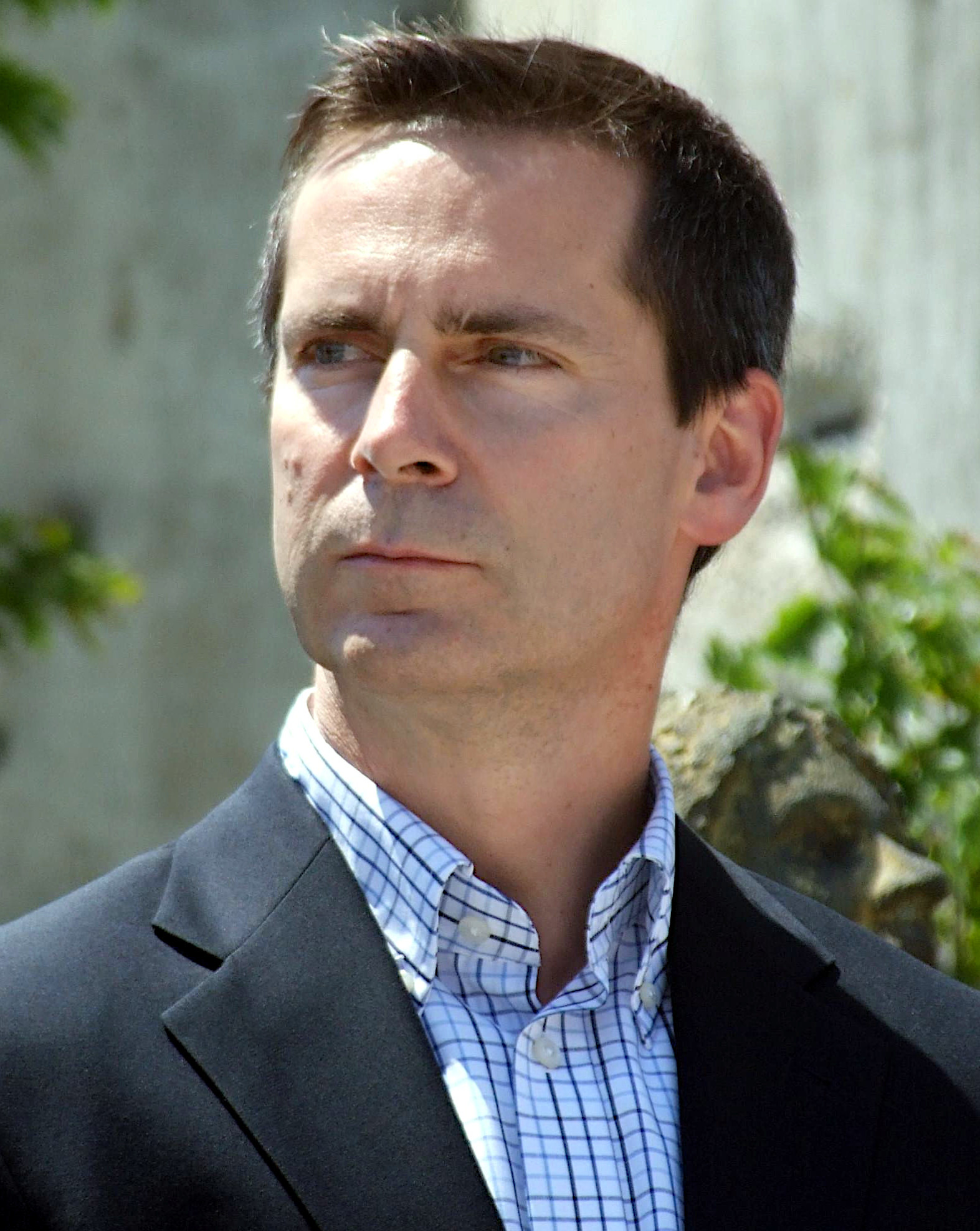
- McGuinty in 2007

24th Premier of Ontario
- In office October 23, 2003 – February 11, 2013
- Monarch: Elizabeth II
- Lieutenant Governor: James Bartleman; David Onley
- Preceded by: Ernie Eves
- Succeeded by: Kathleen Wynne

Leader of the Official Opposition
- In office December 1, 1996 – October 23, 2003
- Preceded by: Lyn McLeod
- Succeeded by: Ernie Eves

Leader of the Ontario Liberal Party
- In office December 1, 1996 – January 26, 2013
- Preceded by: Lyn McLeod
- Succeeded by: Kathleen Wynne

Member of Provincial Parliament for Ottawa South
- In office September 6, 1990 – June 12, 2013
- Preceded by: Dalton McGuinty Sr.
- Succeeded by: John Fraser

Personal details
- Born: Dalton James Patrick McGuinty Jr. July 19, 1955 (age 71) Ottawa, Ontario, Canada
- Party: Ontario Liberal
- Spouse: Terri McGuinty (m. 1980)
- Parent: Dalton McGuinty Sr. (father)
- Relatives: David McGuinty (brother)
- Education: McMaster University (BSc); University of Ottawa (LLB)

Dalton James Patrick McGuinty Jr. OOnt ECO (born July 19, 1955) is a Canadian former politician who served as the 24th premier of Ontario from 2003 to 2013. He was the first Liberal leader to win two majority governments since Mitchell Hepburn nearly 70 years earlier. In 2011, he became the first Liberal premier to secure a third consecutive term since Oliver Mowat after his party was re-elected in that year's provincial election.

McGuinty was born in Ottawa. He studied science at university, but ended up taking a law degree and practiced law in Ottawa. His father served as a Liberal member of Provincial Parliament (MPP) from 1987 until his death in 1990. A provincial election was called for later that year and McGuinty successfully ran in his father's seat, though the incumbent Liberal government was defeated. After party leader Lyn McLeod resigned due to her leading the Liberals to a second defeat in the 1995 election, McGuinty was elected leader in the 1996 leadership election. McGuinty lost the 1999 election to Progressive Conservative Premier Mike Harris, but won a resounding majority in 2003.

From 2003 to 2007, McGuinty's government increased spending for health care and education. He won another majority in 2007, though his second term was deeply affected by the 2008 financial crisis, which saw government revenues plummet. In addition, a scandal developed around a new plan to update health care records called eHealth Ontario. Just prior to the 2011 election, another controversy developed when McGuinty's government cancelled gas plants that were located in key Liberal ridings and were widely opposed by the local residents. The cost to cancel the projects was close to $1 billion and the move was seen as pandering to the electorate in a few electoral districts. The scandal caused the Liberals to be reduced to a minority government.

McGuinty continued as premier for another year and a half, but the continuing gas plant issue refused to go away. He prorogued the legislature in October 2012 before being succeeded as Liberal leader and premier by Kathleen Wynne in February 2013. McGuinty resigned his own seat in June 2013. Shortly after leaving the legislature, he was named a senior fellow at Harvard University's Weatherhead Center for International Affairs.

== Early life ==
McGuinty was born in Ottawa, Ontario. His parents are politician and professor Dalton McGuinty Sr. and full-time nurse Elizabeth (Pexton) McGuinty. The son of a Francophone mother and an Anglophone father, McGuinty is bilingual. McGuinty is the second Roman Catholic to hold the premiership. His father was of Irish descent, and his mother of English and French Canadian ancestry. His maternal grandfather immigrated to Canada from England. He has nine brothers and sisters. His younger brother David has represented the riding of Ottawa South in the House of Commons of Canada since 2004.

He is an alumnus of St. Patrick's High School in Ottawa, earning a B.Sc. in biology from McMaster University. He then earned his LL.B from the University of Ottawa before practicing law in Ottawa.

Since 1980, he has been married to high school girlfriend Terri McGuinty, an elementary school teacher. The couple have one daughter and three sons.

== Member of Provincial Parliament ==
McGuinty's father, Dalton Sr., served as Member of Provincial Parliament (MPP) for Ottawa South until his death in 1990. Dalton Jr. won the Liberal Party's nomination for his father's former riding for the provincial election of 1990 and was elected to the Legislative Assembly of Ontario.

The Liberal government of David Peterson was defeated by the social democratic Ontario New Democratic Party (NDP) in that election. In opposition, McGuinty served as the Liberal Party's critic for energy, environment and colleges and universities. He was re-elected in Ottawa South in the 1995 provincial election without much difficulty. The Liberals maintained their status as the official opposition amid a provincial swing from the NDP to the Progressive Conservatives.

== Provincial leadership ==
McGuinty's supporters in his 1996 leadership bid included John Manley, Murray Elston, and Bob Chiarelli. He was elected leader at the party's convention December in a surprise victory over front-runner Gerard Kennedy.

Kennedy, a former head of Toronto's Daily Bread food bank, was popular on the progressive wing of the party, while McGuinty built his core support on its establishment and pro-business right-wing. McGuinty was fourth on the first and second ballots, closely behind Dwight Duncan. He then overtook Duncan and Joe Cordiano on the third and fourth ballots, respectively, receiving the support of their delegates to win on the fifth ballot over Kennedy. Critics called McGuinty "Harris Lite", but his supporters argued that a right-leaning leader like McGuinty was necessary to compete against the Progressive Conservative Party of Ontario (PC Party) of Premier Mike Harris.

== Opposition leader ==
McGuinty's first term in opposition was difficult. The governing Progressive Conservatives played up McGuinty's low profile by defining him as "not up to the job" in a series of television advertisements. His internal management of the Liberal Party was also criticized by some.

McGuinty's performance in the early weeks of the 1999 provincial election was widely criticized in the media, and he was generally regarded as having performed poorly in the election's only leaders' debate. In response to a question by late CITY-TV journalist Colin Vaughan, he described Mike Harris as a "thug" who is lying to the people of Ontario.

McGuinty's Liberals won support from progressive voters who had supported the Ontario New Democratic Party, and now hoped to defeat the governing Conservatives by strategic voting. The Progressive Conservative Party was re-elected, and McGuinty rallied his party in the election's closing days to draw 40% of the popular vote for the Liberals, their second-best performance in fifty years, which increased their seat total in the Legislature from 30 to 36. McGuinty himself faced a surprisingly difficult re-election in Ottawa South, before defeating his Conservative opponent by about 3,000 votes.

During McGuinty's second term as opposition leader, he hired a more skilled group of advisors and drafted former cabinet minister Greg Sorbara as party president. McGuinty also rebuilt the party's fundraising operation, launching the Ontario Liberal Fund. In preparation for the 2003 election, the party adopted a platform that emphasized lowering class sizes in schools, hiring more nurses, increasing environmental protections, and "holding the line" on taxes. McGuinty also made an effort to improve his debating skills and received coaching from Scott Reid who also trained United States Senator John McCain.

McGuinty's chances of forming government were improved by a number of controversies involving the governing PC Party, including the fallout over the shooting death of native protester Dudley George at Ipperwash, the deaths of seven people from tainted water in Walkerton, and the decision to provide tax credits to parents who sent their children to private schools.

Harris resigned in 2001 and his successor, Ernie Eves, received a short boost in the polls from his attempts to move the PC Party to the centre.

=== 2003 election campaign ===
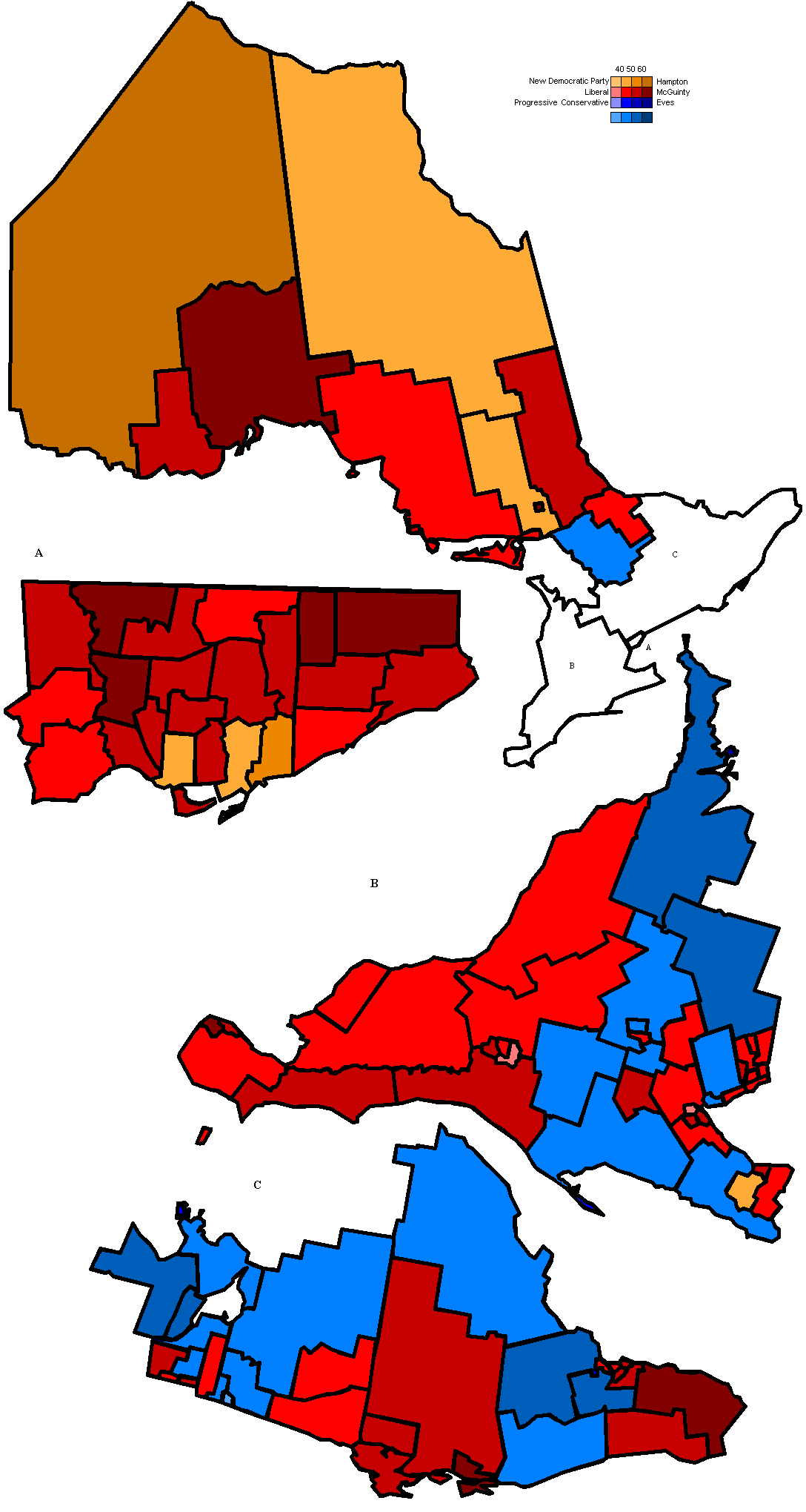
McGuinty's Liberals' 2003 sweep of the province. Liberal seats won appear in shades of red.

The 2003 North America blackout gave Eves increased exposure and rallied some support for his party. He called an election immediately after the blackout, and polling showed that the previous Liberal lead had narrowed to a tie in the first week. The rise in Tory support was short-lived. The Liberals took a commanding lead in the campaign's second week, and remained in that position until election day.

The Progressive Conservative government accidentally distributed a press release which described McGuinty as an "evil reptilian kitten-eater from another planet". Eves later stated that this was obviously meant as a joke, but acknowledged its inappropriateness.

McGuinty undertook a series of choreographed events, including signing a taxpayer protection pledge not to raise taxes. He appeared on the popular sports show "Off the Record", where he received an endorsement from Canadian Idol winner Ryan Malcolm.

McGuinty was able to maintain his party's standing in the polls in the last stages, preventing Eves from making up ground during the leader's debate. On election day, the Liberal were elected to a majority government, winning 72 of the Ontario Legislature's 103 seats. The PC Party fell to 24 seats, while the NDP lost official party status in the legislature.

Following the election, the McGuinty government asked former Provincial Auditor Erik Peters to examine the province's finances. Peters revealed that the out-going Progressive Conservative government had left a hidden deficit of at least $5.6 billion. The Conservatives questioned Peters' methodology, and suggested that the McGuinty government was overstating the province's financial difficulties to break or delay some of its campaign spending promises.

== Premier of Ontario (2003–2013) ==
=== First term (2003–2007) ===
==== First year ====
McGuinty took office as Premier and Minister of Intergovernmental Affairs on October 23, 2003.

The new government called the Legislature back in session in late 2003. The government brought in auto insurance reforms (including a price cap), rolled-back a series of corporate and personal tax cuts that had been scheduled for 2004, passed legislation that enshrined publicly funded healthcare into provincial law, hired more meat and water inspectors, opened up the provincially owned electricity companies to Freedom of Information laws and enacted a ban on partisan government advertising.

On May 18, 2004, Provincial Finance Minister Greg Sorbara released the McGuinty government's first budget, the first year of a four-year plan focused on tackling four deficits the Liberals claim the previous Tories left behind: the "health deficit", the "education deficit", the "infrastructure deficit" and the "fiscal deficit".

This budget was focused on health care. At its core was a large infusion of new money into hospitals specifically to shorten wait times in key areas: knee and hip replacements, cancer treatment, cardiac treatment, cataracts, and MRI and CT scans. The government also brought in free immunizations for children, 150 new Family Health Teams to improve access to physicians, almost 100,000 new home care spaces for Ontario's elderly, almost 4,000 new long-term care beds, and $200 million more to improve public health and fight potential outbreaks like SARS and West Nile fever.

To pay for this plan, the Liberals imposed a controversial new Health Premium of $300 to $900, staggered according to income. This violated a key Liberal campaign pledge not to raise taxes, and gave the government an early reputation for breaking promises. The Liberals defended the premium by arguing that the previous government had a hidden deficit, and McGuinty claimed he needed to break his campaign pledge on taxation to fulfill his promises on other fronts. His own finance critic of the time, Gerry Phillips, had predicted that the Tories' projected balanced budget would in fact result in a $5 billion deficit in a meeting of the Standing Committee of Estimates of the Legislature on June 3, 2003. Liberal MPP Monte Kwinter also predicted a $5 billion deficit.

As a result, the Liberals dropped badly in polls and McGuinty fell behind Ernie Eves in the category of preferred premier.

The Ontario Health Premium also became a major issue in the early days of the 2004 federal election, called a week after the Ontario budget. Many believe that the controversy hampered Liberal Prime Minister Paul Martin's bid for re-election.

Also controversial was the elimination of coverage for health services not covered by the Canada Health Act including eye examinations and physical therapy. Other elements of the McGuinty government's first budget were a four-year plan to tackle the deficit, funding for 1,000 new teachers, a transfer of two cents of the existing gas tax to municipalities to help fund transit, and a three per cent increase to those on social assistance, the first increase in ten years.

Soon after the federal election, McGuinty attended a First Ministers' Meeting on health-care reform that resulted in a new agreement for a national health accord. This Accord saw the provinces receive new federal funding in exchange for providing reports on such things as waiting times for surgeries.

McGuinty's government ended the year by releasing "Progress Report 2004: Getting Results for Ontario". This work focused on health, education, and economic growth, and set targets to achieve before the next election (including reducing the high school drop out rate, increasing participation in post-secondary education and reducing wait times for specific medical procedures).

==== Second year ====
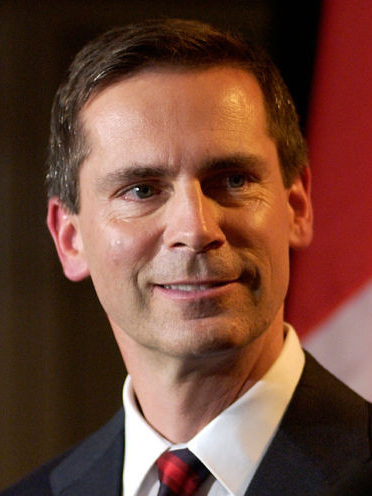
Dalton McGuinty in 2004

The McGuinty government brought forward a number of initiatives in the fall of 2004. These included legislation allowing restaurant patrons to bring their own wine, banning junk food in public schools, outlawing smoking in public places, and requiring students to stay in school until age 18. Following a series of high-profile maulings by pit bulls, the government also moved to ban the dogs. Some Ontarians were critical of this issue since it was seen as moving the responsibility for safety away from owners and over toward the animals. People who owned pitbulls previous to the ban were allowed to keep them, muzzled in public and sterilized to prevent them from breeding. The "importing" and breeding of pitbulls in Ontario was banned, while all pitbulls being held in shelters were euthanized or sent to research facilities.

During early 2005, McGuinty called the Legislature back for a rare winter session to debate and pass several high-profile bills. The government legislated a "greenbelt" around Toronto. The size of Prince Edward Island, the Greenbelt protects a broad swath of land from development and preserves forests and farmland. In response to court decisions, the McGuinty Liberals updated legislation to reflect the change in the definition of marriage to include homosexual couples.

McGuinty also launched a campaign to narrow the so-called "$23 billion gap" between what Ontario contributes to the federal government and what is returned to Ontario in services. This came as a sharp turn after more than a year of cooperating with the federal government. McGuinty said special deals made by the federal government with other provinces (Newfoundland and Labrador and Nova Scotia) compromised the nature of equalization. He noted that immigrants in Ontario receive $800 in support from the federal government, while those in Quebec receive $3,800.

Premier McGuinty and Prime Minister Paul Martin debated the Ontario government's accusations throughout the spring of 2005. McGuinty and Martin finally met in May and, following a nine-hour meeting, McGuinty received a commitment for $5.75 billion, spread out over five years, including new money for immigrant settlement, training for the unemployed, federal delivery of meat inspection and corporate tax collection and per capita funding for post-secondary education.

In late April 2005, McGuinty announced the closure of the Lakeview coal-fired generating station, one of Ontario's largest polluters. Although the McGuinty government had promised to close all coal-burning plants by 2007, Energy Minister Dwight Duncan announced on June 14, 2005, that this was no longer possible, and that the Nanticoke Coal Plant will not close until 2009.

On May 11, 2005, the McGuinty Liberals delivered their second budget, built around the "Reaching Higher" plan for education. The second year of the four-year plan, this budget was designed to tackle to so-called "education deficit". Investing $6.2 billion over the next four years, the budget included the largest investment in higher education in forty years. It also increased accessibility for low-income students, expanded medical school spaces, and invested in new faculty, graduate scholarships and research. The budget also broke a promise to balance the budget in 2007–08. The government instead aimed at balance in 2008–09.

The McGuinty Liberals also moved to expand infrastructure spending by encouraging Ontario's large pension plans to invest in the construction of new roads, schools and hospitals. Specific projects in the budget included a 10-year expansion of the Toronto Transit Commission and GO Transit, 15,000 new affordable housing units and improved border crossings. NDP leader Howard Hampton described this move as "privatization by stealth".

During their second year in office, the McGuinty Liberals brought forward a series of negotiations with the province's unions.First, Health Minister George Smitherman concluded an agreement with the province's doctors that included incentives to practice in family health teams or under-serviced communities. Education Minister Gerard Kennedy established a province-wide negotiating framework with the province's teachers' unions with the result that most school boards settled their contracts without lost teaching time. Finally, Management Board Chair Gerry Phillips closed a deal with the provincial government's own civil service union, the Ontario Public Service Employees Union.

On June 22, 2005, Education Minister Gerard Kennedy announced that 90–95% of Ontario students between junior kindergarten and Grade Three would be in classes of twenty students or fewer by 2007. He also acknowledged that extenuating circumstances may require slightly larger classes in some cases. Opposition critic Frank Klees accused the McGuinty government of breaking its promise to cap classroom sizes. Kennedy responded that some flexibility is always necessary, and that any reasonable person would regard a 90–95% success rate as a promise kept.

Also in June 2005, two cabinet ministers in McGuinty's government were scrutinized for alleged improprieties. Joseph Cordiano faced calls for his resignation after revelations that he billed $17,000 for personal expenses to his riding association. These expenses included meals in Paris and Milan, and theatre tickets in London. Cordiano insisted that these expenses were related to riding activities, and refused to resign. McGuinty defended Cordiano in public, claiming he had "complete confidence" in the minister.

At around the same time, Minister of Transportation Harinder Takhar was accused of a conflict-of-interest, after visiting a company that he owned in a blind trust. Takhar acknowledged that he made "an error in judgement", but denied any wrongdoing. Both Cordiano and Takhar were retained in their portfolios following a cabinet shuffle on June 29, 2005. The matter was sent to the provincial ethics commissioner, who on January 4, 2006, ruled that Takhar had violated Ontario's integrity guidelines by not maintaining an arms length relationship with the trustee appointed to run his blind trust. McGuinty has defended his minister, and has rejected calls to remove him from cabinet, even after the Integrity Commissioner issued his finding.

In the same cabinet shuffle, Premier McGuinty withdrew from the Intergovernmental Affairs portfolio and became the province's first Minister of Research and Innovation.

==== Third year ====
On October 11, 2005, police raided the Sorbara Group offices — owned by Greg Sorbara and his brothers — as part of the ongoing Royal Group Technologies investigation. The warrant stated that there were reasonable grounds to believe Sorbara and other directors of Royal Group defrauded the company and shareholders when they bought land in Brampton, that was owned by a subsidiary of the Sorbara Group. Sorbara initially resisted opposition calls for him to step down, then resigned as Minister of Finance the same day. He consistently denied any knowledge of the specific allegations against him, and sued the RCMP to either clarify their case against him or withdraw their investigation. Following Sorbara's resignation, Dwight Duncan was appointed as Minister of Finance and Chair of the Management Board. Donna Cansfield took over Duncan's responsibility as Minister of Energy and Jim Bradley as Government House Leader.

The next day, the McGuinty government put forward a throne speech in October reiterating their priorities of health, education and economic prosperity. The speech outlined plans to offer the first money-back guarantee on a public service: a refund for people who do not receive a birth certificate within 15 days of applying on-line.

On November 18, 2005, it was announced that Ontario's Drive Clean emissions program was to be expanded rather than scrapped.

The 2006 budget was the third year of the four-year plan, and focused on the "infrastructure deficit". The centrepiece was MoveOntario, a $1.2 billion investment in transportation infrastructure. $400 million was invested to build and repair roads and bridges in municipalities across Ontario.

On May 18, 2006, a judge agreed with Greg Sorbara's contention that the Royal Canadian Mounted Police (RCPP) had erred in including his name in the search warrant. In striking Sorbara's name from the warrant, Justice Ian Nordheimer of the Ontario Superior Court said there were inadequate grounds for police to include him in the first place. The judge was particularly scathing in his review of the RCMP probe of Sorbara. On May 23, 2006, Sorbara was reinstated as Minister of Finance, while Duncan returned to the Energy portfolio.

On August 17, 2006, Foreign Direct Investment magazine (a British magazine owned by the Financial Times) named Dalton McGuinty "personality of the year" for encouraging investment in the auto sector, for developing a plan to increase energy production, and for promoting research and innovation.

==== Fourth year ====
On June 14, 2006, Energy Minister Dwight Duncan announced the McGuinty government's twenty-year electricity plan, which committed to spending $46 billion on rebuilding all of the province's ageing nuclear reactors. The plan also made the McGuinty government the first Ontario government since the 1970s to commit to building new nuclear stations, and further postponed the schedule for closing Ontario's coal stations to 2014. In response, Greenpeace activists occupied Energy Minister Duncan's offices. The day after the announcement of its long-term electricity plan The Globe and Mail published a front-page story that the government had quietly passed a regulation to 'exempt' its energy plan from an environmental assessment.

The government's decision to exempt the government's electricity plan was criticized by some environmental organizations. In a press release, Greenpeace, the David Suzuki Foundation, and the Pembina Institute noted that each had provided the government with a legal opinion prepared by the Canadian Environmental Law Association, which concluded that the government's energy plan would be subject to the province's Environmental Assessment Act.

The McGuinty government's 2007 budget was criticized by Toronto mayor David Miller, who argued that the province was refusing to "pay its bills", and said that Toronto's budgetary problems were the result of $500 million in social service costs mandated by the provincial government. During a later discussion, provincial Finance Minister Greg Sorbara declined to help the city to fix its $71 million shortfall, saying that "he doesn't have a mandate to fix this".

On July 26, 2007, McGuinty dismissed Mike Colle as Minister of Citizenship and Immigration following a report by the auditor general that Colle had mishandled government funds. He was criticized for giving out $32 million in government grants to immigrant and cultural groups without official applications or formal statements of purpose. In one case, the Ontario Cricket Association received $1 million when it asked for $150,000.

==== 2007 re-election ====
In late 2004, John Tory was chosen to replace Ernie Eves as leader of the Progressive Conservative Party of Ontario. A principal secretary to former PC Premier Bill Davis, Tory was regarded as more moderate than Mike Harris and the mostly rural MPPs who made up the majority of his caucus. McGuinty's Liberals ran a candidate against Tory during the latter's successful bid to enter the legislature. Howard Hampton continued to lead the NDP. Though Tory out-polled McGuinty in the category of preferred premier, the Liberals held a lead over the Progressive Conservatives, while the NDP held around 20% support.

In October 2006, the McGuinty Liberals held their last Annual General Meeting before the 2007 election. The event set in place several key elements of their reelection strategy. First, American political consultant James Carville advised Liberal activists to stick to a simple message in the next election. Second, the party elected long-time activist Gord Pheneuf as the new president. Finally, Premier McGuinty laid out the theme of the next campaign: standing up for Ontario families.

On October 10, 2007, McGuinty and his Ontario Liberal Party won a consecutive majority government in the 39th general provincial election. The last Liberal Party Premier to achieve such success was Mitchell Hepburn during the 1930s.

=== Second term (2007–2011) ===
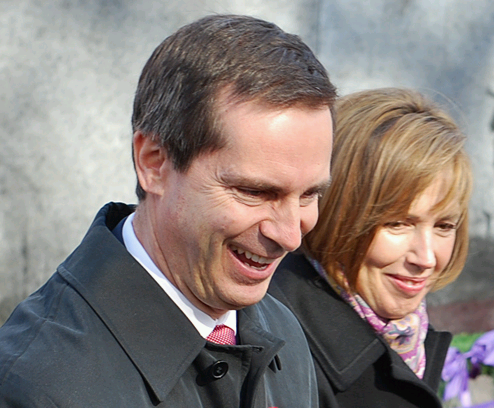
Dalton and Terri McGuinty

The 2009 Ontario Budget contained significant tax policy changes: McGuinty's Minister of Finance Dwight Duncan announced plans to harmonize Ontario's retail sales tax with the federal Goods and Services Tax, and reduce corporate and personal taxes.

On March 31, 2009, McGuinty admitted to considering of the removal of the minimum wage increase at 2010 from $9.25, to $10.25 as a mistake after the reactions that he received from the opposition and anti-poverty activists.

There was criticism of McGuinty and calls for Health Minister David Caplan to resign after it was revealed that eHealth Ontario CEO Sarah Kramer had approved about $4.8 million in no-bid contracts during the first four months of the agency's operation, while also spending, argued that the McGuinty government spent five years and $647 million on the Smart Systems for Health Agency, which used 15 per cent of its $225-million annual budget on consultants despite employing 166 people with annual salaries exceeding $100000, before the project was shut down and restarted as eHealth Ontario. Premier Dalton McGuinty said he was concerned about eHealth's spending information and said that he would act upon the auditor general's report. McGuinty and Caplan said that it was tough to recruit top experts to build a province wide electronic health records system. McGuinty and Caplan promised an independent review of eHealth, outside of the auditor general's probe. It was later revealed that the ministry and eHealth did not contract PricewaterhouseCoopers to conduct the review. The Liberals said it would have duplicated the auditor general's work, and the opposition noted that Caplan had earlier suggested the independent review had been underway. Documents obtained by the press showed that McGuinty intervened using an order in council to have Kramer hired as CEO, bypassing the competitive selection process, over the objections of officials in the Health Ministry who felt she was inexperienced. McGuinty said that he relied upon the advice of then-chairman of eHealth Dr. Alan Hudson and now described Kramer's hiring as a mistake.

==== Gas plant scandal ====
McGuinty's minority government was also criticized for a decision during the 2011 election campaign to scrap unpopular gas plants being constructed in Mississauga and Oakville — the move was seen as a politically expedient one made to improve the Liberal Party's chances of retaining the five ridings it held in the area, as the opposition PC's and NDP had already promised to scrap them. The opposition, emboldened by the minority government situation, demanded that Energy Minister Chris Bentley release all documents related to the decision. Bentley delayed prior to releasing 36,000 pages in September and insisted that all documents had been released. The cancellation of the gas plant was estimated to be $950 million to $1.1 billion over approximately 20 years.

==== 2011 re-election ====
On October 6, 2011, the Liberals were reelected for a third term in government, though they lost their majority in the Legislature. Only winning 53 of the 107 legislative seats, the Liberals were one seat short of a majority.

=== Third term (2011–2013) ===
Now that Ontario had returned to a minority government after decades of majorities, the political landscape changed significantly. The governing Liberals were required to work with the other parties to move forward with legislation and avoid losing a non-confidence motion. McGuinty had promised not to form a coalition with any other party if elected in a minority, and proceeded to govern by attracting support from opposition MPPs on a bill-by-bill basis.

McGuinty commissioned former Toronto-Dominion Bank chief economist Don Drummond to examine the province's finances. In February 2012, Drummond released the report that stated that the province would face a $30-billion deficit by 2017-18, which was nearly double what the McGuinty government had projected. Drummond recommended severe austerity measures to curb the growth of the province's debt, which was $215 billion at the time, from reaching $411 billion in five years. While McGuinty inherited a moderate deficit of $5 billion, it had tripled due to his progressive spending programs as well as the recent economic recession.

The government was soon mired in controversy on several fronts. As a result of Ontario's budgetary situation, the government took a hard line on public sector wages. It introduced Bill 115 'Putting Students First Act 2012' in order to suspend collective bargaining, impose contracts on teachers and suspend their right to strike for two years. It also introduced legislation to impose a wage freeze on 481,000 additional public sector workers in hospitals, colleges, public agencies and the civil service.

In 2012, the Liberals were plagued by yet another scandal. During the Ornge Air Ambulance scandal, the CEO was paid 14.1 million dollars, and the executives purchased a commercial building, and them leased it back to themselves at a higher than market rate, through a shell company.

The Liberals had hoped to regain their majority through by-elections and on September 6, 2012, two by-elections were held, one in Vaughan which the Liberal Party won, and another in Kitchener—Waterloo. Former Deputy Premier Elizabeth Witmer, a Progressive Conservative, had represented Kitchener—Waterloo for the previous four terms. Her resignation allowed the riding to elect Catherine Fife of the New Democratic Party (NDP), leaving McGuinty's Liberals with a minority government. The NDP victory in Kitchener-Waterloo, the seat the Liberals needed to gain, was attributed in part to the backlash against Bill 115; the Liberals placed third in the riding.

==== 2012 prorogation and resignation ====
After it became known that there were an additional 20,000 documents Bentley was cited by a rare contempt motion by a legislative committee and was facing a contempt motion of the Legislature when McGuinty unexpectedly announced on October 15, 2012, that he was ending the legislative session by proroguing the legislature and that he would resign as premier as soon as the Liberal Party chose his successor, in January 2013.

Liberal House Leader John Milloy later stated that prorogation was necessary because an impasse was reached with labour leaders and the opposition over plans to freeze all public sector wages. The opposition charged that it was done to dodge negative publicity over the investigation and criminal probe into the Ornge Air affair, the controversial decision to halt construction of two gas-fired power plants during the previous election, and the subsequent threats by the opposition to vote on finding Cabinet ministers in Contempt of Parliament for withholding from the Legislature information related to halting the projects. In early 2013, Onley explained in an interview conducted by the Toronto Star that, though he and McGuinty discussed the matter, among others, before he granted the prorogation, he could only follow the constitution and adhere to the principles of responsible government; only if the premier were "trying to subvert democracy" could Onley have refused the advice and, as Onley put it, "something that's politically controversial doesn't fit that category. Doesn't even come close.... It's up to the politicians to work out the political process, the political decision-making that is behind prorogation—and the fallout after prorogation." On the subject of the lack of a date on which the Legislature would be summoned to return, the Lieutenant-Governor said he had no guide; the Legislature's standing orders outline that a specific date must be set, but the Legislative Assembly Act does not, and precedents are inconsistent.

While there had been speculation that McGuinty would become a candidate for the federal Liberal leadership election, on October 23, 2012, he announced that he would not be doing so. McGuinty resigned from his premiership on February 11, 2013. He resigned his seat in the legislature on June 12, 2013, at the end of the legislative session, after representing Ottawa South for 23 years.

== Life after politics ==
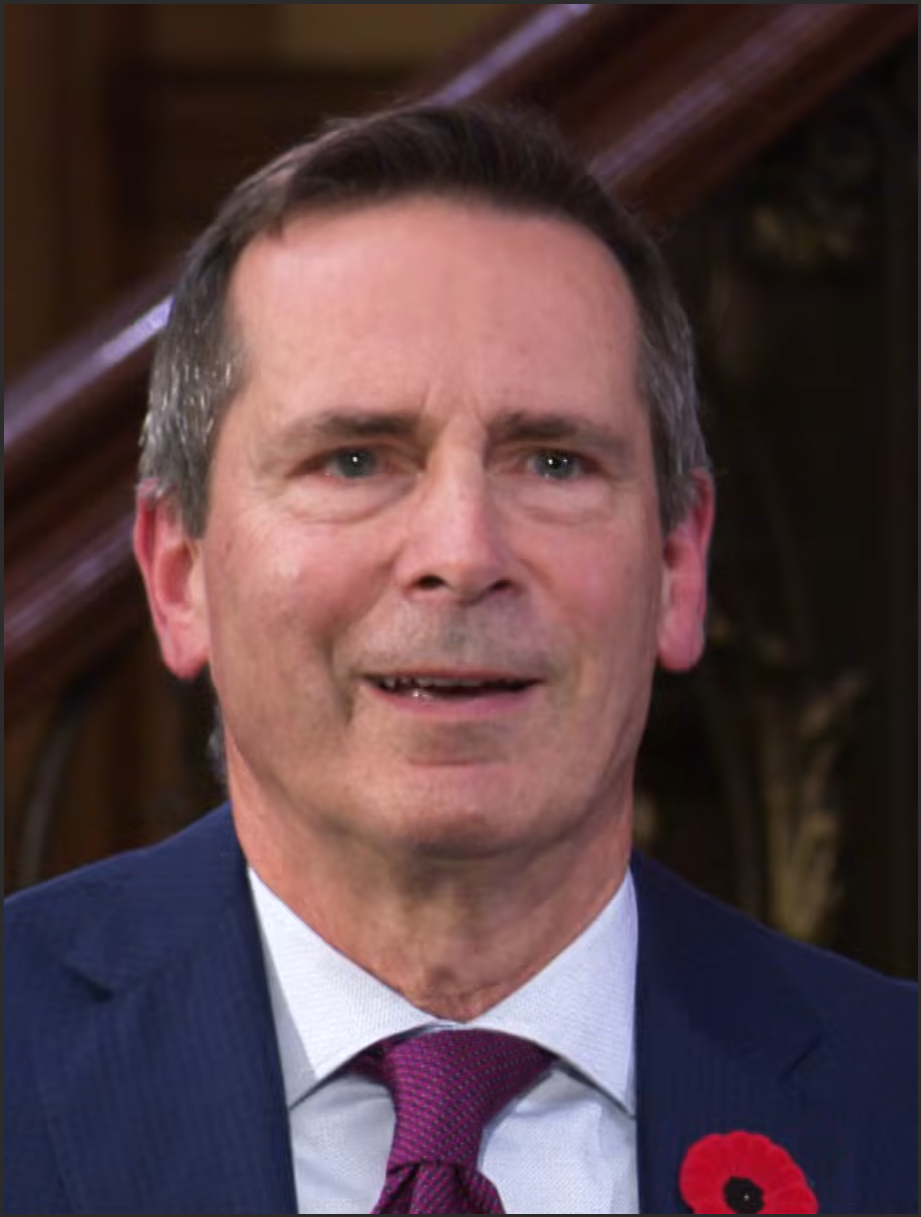
McGuinty in December 2025

In June 2013, McGuinty was named a senior fellow for the fall semester at Harvard University's Weatherhead Center for International Affairs.

McGuinty published a memoir with Dundurn Press in 2014 called Dalton McGuinty: Making a Difference about his life in politics.

== Honours ==

Ribbon	Description	Notes
	Order of Ontario (O.Ont)	2018
	Queen Elizabeth II Golden Jubilee Medal	2002; Canadian version of this medal
	Queen Elizabeth II Diamond Jubilee Medal	2012; Canadian version of this medal

=== Scholastic ===
University degrees

Location	Date	School	Degree
Ontario		McMaster University	Bachelor of Science (B.Sc) in Biology
Ontario		University of Ottawa	Bachelor of Laws (LL.B)

Chancellor, visitor, governor, rector and fellowships

Location	Date	School	Position
Massachusetts	2013 – 2014	Weatherhead Center for International Affairs at Harvard University	Senior Fellow
Ontario	2015 – 2016	Munk School of Global Affairs and Public Policy of University of Toronto	Senior Fellow
Ontario		School of Public Policy & Administration at Carleton University	Fellow

=== Honorary degrees ===
Location	Date	School	Degree	Gave commencement address
Ontario	2006	University of Ottawa	Doctor of the University (D.Univ)	Yes

=== Memberships and non-scholastic fellowships ===
Location	Date	Organisation	Position
Ontario		Law Society of Upper Canada	Member

== Awards ==
Location	Date	Institution	Award
Ontario	30 October 2013	Council of Ontario Universities	David C. Smith Award

== Freedom of the City ==
- (Ontario) 15 May 2019: Ottawa.

== See also ==
- Education in Ontario
- Ontario Liberal Party
- Liberal Party of Canada
- Legislative Assembly of Ontario
- Ottawa South (provincial electoral district)
- 1996 Ontario Liberal Party leadership election
- Harmonized Sales Tax
- Ontario power plant scandal

McGuinty ministry, Province of Ontario (2003–2013)
Cabinet posts (3)
Predecessor	Office	Successor
Michael Bryant	Minister of Economic Development; May 25, 2009 – June 24, 2009	Sandra Pupatello
Ernie Eves; Marie Bountrogianni; Monique Smith	Minister of Intergovernmental Affairs; October 23, 2003 – June 29, 2005; October 30, 2007 – January 18, 2010; October 20, 2011 – February 11, 2013	Marie Bountrogianni; Monique Smith; Laurel Broten
Ministry Created	Minister of Research and Innovation; June 29, 2005 – October 30, 2007	John Wilkinson
