= 32nd Parliament of Ontario =

Legislature, 1981–1985

The 32nd Legislative Assembly of Ontario was in session from March 19, 1981, until March 25, 1985, just prior to the 1985 general election. The majority party was the Ontario Progressive Conservative Party led by Bill Davis.

In 1985, Davis retired as party leader and Frank Miller was chosen as party leader in a leadership convention held in January 1985.

John Melville Turner served as speaker for the assembly.

== Members ==
Riding	Member	Party	First elected / previously elected	No. of terms	Notes
Algoma	Charles Jackson Wildman	New Democratic Party	1975	3rd term	
Algoma—Manitoulin	John Gordon Lane	Progressive Conservative	1971	4th term	
Armourdale	Bruce Robert McCaffrey	Progressive Conservative	1977	2nd term	
Beaches—Woodbine	Marion Helen Bryden	New Democratic Party	1975	3rd term	
Bellwoods	Ross A. McClellan	New Democratic Party	1975	3rd term	
Brampton	William Grenville Davis	Progressive Conservative	1959	7th term	Premier and Party Leader
Brant—Oxford—Norfolk	Robert Fletcher Nixon	Liberal	1962	7th term	Party Leader
Brantford	Philip Andrew Gillies	Progressive Conservative	1981	1st term	
Brock	Robert Stanley Welch	Progressive Conservative	1963	6th term	
Burlington South	George Albert Kerr	Progressive Conservative	1963	6th term	
Cambridge	William Walter Barlow	Progressive Conservative	1981	1st term	
Carleton	Robert C. Mitchell	Progressive Conservative	1980	2nd term	
Carleton East	Robert W. MacQuarrie	Progressive Conservative	1981	1st term	
Carleton-Grenville	Norm Sterling	Progressive Conservative	1977	2nd term	
Chatham—Kent	Andrew Naismith Watson	Progressive Conservative	1978	2nd term	
Cochrane North	René L. Piché	Progressive Conservative	1981	1st term	
Cochrane South	Alan William Pope	Progressive Conservative	1977	2nd term	
Cornwall	George Samis	New Democratic Party	1974	4th term	
Don Mills	Dennis Roy Timbrell	Progressive Conservative	1971	4th term	
Dovercourt	Antonio Lupusella	New Democratic Party	1975	3rd term	
Downsview	Odoardo Di Santo	New Democratic Party	1975	3rd term	
Dufferin—Simcoe	George R. McCague	Progressive Conservative	1975	3rd term	
Durham East	Sammy Lawrence Cureatz	Progressive Conservative	1977	2nd term	
Durham West	George Ashe	Progressive Conservative	1977	2nd term	
Durham—York	Kenneth Ross Stevenson	Progressive Conservative	1981	1st term	
Eglinton	Roland McMurtry	Progressive Conservative	1975	3rd term	
Elgin	Ronald Keith McNeil	Progressive Conservative	1958	8th term	
Erie	Raymond Louis Haggerty	Liberal	1967	5th term	
Essex North	Dick Ruston	Liberal	1967	5th term	
Essex South	Remo J. Mancini	Liberal	1975	3rd term	
Etobicoke	Ed Thomas Philip	New Democratic Party	1975	3rd term	
Fort William	Michael Patrick Hennessy	Progressive Conservative	1977	2nd term	
Frontenac—Addington	Joseph Earl McEwen	Liberal	1975	3rd term	Join the Progressive Conservatives in 1984
Frontenac—Addington	Joseph Earl McEwen	Progressive Conservative	1975	3rd term	Join the Progressive Conservatives in 1984
Grey	Robert Carson McKessock	Liberal	1975	3rd term	
Grey—Bruce	Edward Carson Sargent	Liberal	1963	6th term	
Haldimand—Norfolk	Gordon Irvin Miller	Liberal	1975	3rd term	
Halton—Burlington	Julian Alexander Arnott Reed	Liberal	1975	3rd term	
Hamilton Centre	Sheila Maureen Copps	Liberal	1981	1st term	Resigned in 1984
Hamilton Centre	Michael Norman Davison (1984)	New Democratic Party	1975, 1984	3rd term*	
Hamilton East	Bob Warren Mackenzie	New Democratic Party	1975	3rd term	
Hamilton Mountain	Brian Albert Charlton	New Democratic Party	1977	2nd term	
Hamilton West	Stuart Lyon Smith (Note: retired)	Liberal	1975	3rd term	Party Leader
Hamilton West	Richard Alexander Allen (1982)	New Democratic Party	1982	1st term	
Hastings—Peterborough	James Pollock	Progressive Conservative	1981	1st term	
High Park—Swansea	Yuri Shymko	Progressive Conservative	1981	1st term	
Humber	Morley Kells	Progressive Conservative	1981	1st term	
Huron—Bruce	Murray John Elston	Liberal	1981	1st term	
Huron—Middlesex	John Keith Riddell	Liberal	1973	4th term	
Kenora	Leo Edward Bernier	Progressive Conservative	1966	6th term	
Kent—Elgin	James Fitzgerald McGuigan	Liberal	1977	2nd term	
Kingston and the Islands	Keith Calder Norton	Progressive Conservative	1975	3rd term	
Kitchener	James Roos Breithaupt	Liberal	1967	5th term	
Kitchener—Wilmot	John Sweeney	Liberal	1975	3rd term	
Lake Nipigon	John Edward Stokes	New Democratic Party	1967	5th term	
Lakeshore	Albert Kolyn	Progressive Conservative	1981	1st term	
Lambton	Lorne Charles Henderson	Progressive Conservative	1963	6th term	
Lanark	Douglas Jack Wiseman	Progressive Conservative	1971	4th term	
Leeds	Robert W. Runciman	Progressive Conservative	1981	1st term	
Lincoln	Philip W. Andrewes	Progressive Conservative	1981	1st term	
London Centre	David Robertson Peterson	Liberal	1975	3rd term	Party Leader
London North	Ronald George Van Horne	Liberal	1977	2nd term	
London South	Gordon Wayne Walker	Progressive Conservative	1971, (Note: London North) 1977	3rd term*	
Middlesex	Robert Gordon Eaton	Progressive Conservative	1971	4th term	
Mississauga East	Milton Edward Charles Gregory	Progressive Conservative	1975	3rd term	
Mississauga North	Terry David Jones	Progressive Conservative	1975	3rd term	
Mississauga South	Robert Douglas Kennedy	Progressive Conservative	1967	5th term	
Muskoka	Frank Stuart Miller	Progressive Conservative	1971	4th term	Premier and Party Leader
Niagara Falls	Vincent George Kerrio	Liberal	1975	3rd term	
Nickel Belt	Floyd Laughren	New Democratic Party	1971	4th term	
Nipissing	Michael Harris	Progressive Conservative	1981	1st term	
Northumberland	Howard Nicholas Sheppard	Progressive Conservative	1981	1st term	
Oakville	James Wilfred Snow	Progressive Conservative	1967	5th term	
Oakwood	Anthony William Grande	New Democratic Party	1975	3rd term	
Oriole	John Reesor Williams	Progressive Conservative	1975	3rd term	
Oshawa	Michael James Breaugh	New Democratic Party	1975	3rd term	
Ottawa Centre	Michael Morris Cassidy	New Democratic Party	1971	4th term	Party Leader
Ottawa Centre	Evelyn Adelaide Gigantes (1984)	New Democratic Party	1975, (Note: Carleton East) 1984	3rd term*	
Ottawa East	Albert J. Roy	Liberal	1971	4th term	Resigned seat in 1984
Ottawa East	Bernard C. Grandmaître (1984)	Liberal	1984	1st term	Elected in by-election in 1984
Ottawa South	Claude Frederick Bennett	Progressive Conservative	1971	4th term	
Ottawa West	Reuben Conrad Baetz	Progressive Conservative	1977	2nd term	
Oxford	Richard L. Treleaven	Progressive Conservative	1981	1st term	
Parkdale	Tony Ruprecht	Liberal	1981	1st term	
Parry Sound	Ernie Eves	Progressive Conservative	1981	1st term	
Perth	Hugh Alden Edighoffer	Liberal	1967	5th term	
Peterborough	John Melville Turner	Progressive Conservative	1971, 1977	3rd term*	
Port Arthur	James Francis Foulds	New Democratic Party	1971	4th term	
Prescott and Russell	Don Boudria	Liberal	1981	1st term	Resigned in 1984
Prescott and Russell	Jean Poirier (1984)	Liberal	1984	1st term	Elected in by-election in 1984
Prince Edward—Lennox	James A. Taylor	Progressive Conservative	1971	4th term	
Quinte	Hugh Patrick O'Neil	Liberal	1975	3rd term	
Rainy River	T. Patrick Reid	Liberal-Labour	1967	5th term	
Renfrew North	Sean Conway	Liberal	1975	3rd term	
Renfrew South	Paul Joseph Yakabuski	Progressive Conservative	1963	6th term	
Riverdale	Jim Renwick	New Democratic Party	1964	6th term	Died in 1984
Sarnia	Andy Brandt	Progressive Conservative	1981	1st term	
Sault Ste. Marie	Russell Harold Ramsay	Progressive Conservative	1978	2nd term	
Scarborough Centre	James Francis Drea	Progressive Conservative	1971	4th term	
Scarborough East	Margaret Birch	Progressive Conservative	1971	4th term	
Scarborough North	Thomas Leonard Wells	Progressive Conservative	1963	6th term	
Scarborough West	Richard Frank Johnston	New Democratic Party	1979	2nd term	
Scarborough—Ellesmere	Alan Robinson	Progressive Conservative	1981	1st term	
Simcoe Centre	George William Taylor	Progressive Conservative	1977	2nd term	
Simcoe East	Allan Kenneth McLean	Progressive Conservative	1981	1st term	
St. Andrew—St. Patrick	Lawrence Sheldon Grossman	Progressive Conservative	1975	3rd term	
St. Catharines	Jim Bradley	Liberal	1977	2nd term	
St. David	Margaret Scrivener	Progressive Conservative	1971	4th term	
St. George	Susan A. Fish	Progressive Conservative	1981	1st term	
Stormont—Dundas—Glengarry	Osie Villeneuve	Progressive Conservative	1948, 1963	9th term*	Died in 1983
Stormont—Dundas—Glengarry	Noble Villeneuve (1983)	Progressive Conservative	1983	1st term	Elected in by-election in 1983
Sudbury	Jim Gordon	Progressive Conservative	1981	1st term	
Sudbury East	Elie Walter Martel	New Democratic Party	1967	5th term	
Timiskaming	Edward Michael Havrot	Progressive Conservative	1971, 1977	3rd term*	
Victoria—Haliburton	John F. Eakins	Liberal	1975	3rd term	
Waterloo North	Herbert Arnold Epp	Liberal	1977	2nd term	
Welland—Thorold	Mel Swart	New Democratic Party	1975	3rd term	
Wellington South	Harry A. Worton	Liberal	1955	8th term	
Wellington—Dufferin—Peel	John McLellan Johnson	Progressive Conservative	1975	3rd term	
Wentworth	Gordon Howlett Dean	Progressive Conservative	1981	1st term	
Wentworth North	Eric Gordon Cunningham (Note: resigned to run for federal seat)	Liberal	1975	3rd term	Resigned seat in 1984
Wentworth North	Ann Sloat (1984)	Progressive Conservative	1984	1st term	Elected in by-election in 1984
Wilson Heights	David Rotenberg	Progressive Conservative	1977	2nd term	
Windsor—Riverside	Dave Cooke	New Democratic Party	1977	2nd term	
Windsor—Sandwich	William Munro Wrye	Liberal	1981	1st term	
Windsor—Walkerville	Bernard Newman	Liberal	1959	7th term	
York Centre	W. Donald Cousens	Progressive Conservative	1981	1st term	
York East	Robert Goldwin Elgie	Progressive Conservative	1977	2nd term	
York Mills	Bette Stephenson	Progressive Conservative	1975	3rd term	
York North	William Marshall Chamberlain Hodgson	Progressive Conservative	1967	5th term	
York South	Donald Cameron MacDonald	New Democratic Party	1955	8th term	Resigned seat in 1982
York South	Bob Keith Rae (1982)	New Democratic Party	1982	1st term	Elected in by-election in 1982, Party Leader
York West	Nicholas Georges Leluk	Progressive Conservative	1971	4th term	
Yorkview	Michael A. Spensieri	Liberal	1981	1st term	

== Post-election changes ==
Hamilton West: Stuart Smith resigned his legislative seat on January 25, 1982, and a by-election was called for June 17, 1982.

- Richard Allen (NDP) 8,915
- Bob McMurrich (PC) 7,066
- Joe Barbera (L) 6,952
- John Turmel 174

York South: Donald C. MacDonald resigned his legislative seat in 1982, and a by-election was called for November 4, 1982.

- Bob Rae (NDP) 11,212
- John Nunziata (L) 8,595
- Barbara Jafelice (PC) 4,376
- Myron Petriw (Lbt) 234
- John Turmel 66

Stormont—Dundas and Glengarry: Osie Villeneuve died in 1983, and a by-election has called on December 15, 1983:

- Noble Villeneuve (PC) 12,197
- Johnny Whitteker (L) 8,062
- Rudi Derstroff (NDP) 627
- John Turmel 97

Frontenac—Addington: Liberal MPP J. Earl McEwen crossed the floor to join the Progressive Conservatives in 1984.

Hamilton Centre: Sheila Copps resigned her legislative seat in 1984, and a by-election was held on December 13, 1984:

- Mike Davison (NDP) 5308
- Lily Oddie Munro (L) 5,253
- Sandi Bell (PC) 3,314
- Kerry Wilson (Comm) 124

Ottawa Centre: Michael Cassidy resigned his legislative seat in 1984, and a by-election was held on December 13, 1984.

- Evelyn Gigantes (NDP) 8,165
- Graham Bird (PC) 5,870
- Lowell Green (L) 5,202
- Greg Vezina (G) 130
- Ray Joseph Cormier 94
- John Turmel 90

Ottawa East: Albert J. Roy resigned his legislative seat in 1984, and a by-election was held on December 13, 1984:

- Bernard Grandmaître (L) 7,754
- Richard Boudreau (PC) 1,934
- Jean Gilbert (NDP) 1,531
- Serge Girard 122

Prescott and Russell: Don Boudria resigned his legislative seat in 1984, and a by-election was held on December 13, 1984:

- Jean Poirier (L) 10,182
- Gaston Patenaude (PC) 8,347
- Rheo Lalonde (NDP) 1,791

Wentworth North: Eric Cunningham resigned his legislative seat in 1984, and a by-election was held on December 13, 1984:

- Ann Sloat (PC) 8,524
- Chris Ward (L) 8,355
- Lynn Spencer (NDP) 3,115
- George Graham (Lbt) 162

Riverdale: Jim Renwick died in 1984.

Kitchener: Jim Breithaupt resigned in 1984.

Rainy River: T. Patrick Reid resigned in 1984.

Eglinton: Roy McMurtry resigned his seat in 1985 to take a government position in the United Kingdom.

== See also ==
- Members in Parliament 32
