= Ontario New Democratic Party candidates in the 1981 Ontario provincial election =

The New Democratic Party of Ontario ran a full slate of candidates in the 1981 provincial election and won 21 seats out of 125 to become the third-largest party in the legislature. Many of the party's candidates have their own biography pages; information about others may be found here.

== Central Ontario ==
Riding	Candidate's Name	Notes	Residence	Occupation	Votes	%	Rank
Dufferin—Simcoe	Edward Robinson				4,007		3rd
Hastings—Peterborough	Elmer Buchanan				2,968		3rd
Muskoka–Georgian Bay	James Maguire				3,214		3rd
Northumberland	Benjamin Burd				2,711		3rd
Peterborough	J. Paul Rexe	Member of Peterborough City Council (1980–1987 & 1972–1974); NDP candidate for Peterborough in the 1980 federal election	Peterborough	Teacher	8,756		3rd
Simcoe Centre	Gaye Lamb				4,532		3rd
Simcoe East	Fayne Bullen				9,085		2nd
Victoria—Haliburton	Arthur Field				2,449		3rd

== Eastern Ontario/Ottawa ==
Riding	Candidate's Name	Notes	Residence	Occupation	Votes	%	Rank
Carleton	Judy Wasylycia-Leis				5,446		3rd
Carleton East	Evelyn Gigantes	Member of Provincial Parliament for Carleton East (1975–1981)		Radio/television broadcaster	11,579		3rd
Cornwall	George Samis				9,484		1st
Frontenac—Addington	James Maloney				2,374		3rd
Kingston and the Islands	Ronald Murray				3,897		3rd
Lanark	Charles Bennett				2,659		3rd
Leeds	Robert Smith				2,940		3rd
Ottawa Centre	Michael Cassidy				9,316		1st
Ottawa East	Danielle Page				1,905		3rd
Ottawa South	Chris Chilton				6,146		3rd
Ottawa West	John MacMillan				2,348		3rd
Prescott and Russell	Claude Dion				1,828		3rd
Prince Edward—Lennox	Lorne King				1,423		3rd
Quinte	Reg Pearson				1,795		3rd
Renfrew North	Philip Chester				1,086		3rd
Renfrew South	Aileen Pattinson				1,174		3rd
Stormont, Dundas, and Glengarry	Clifford O'Neill				1,836		3rd

== Greater Toronto Area ==
Riding	Candidate's Name	Notes	Residence	Occupation	Votes	%	Rank
Armourdale	Robert Hebdon				4,240		3rd
Beaches—Woodbine	Marion Bryden	Member of Provincial Parliament for Beaches—Woodbine (1975–1990)		Researcher/statistician	9,590		1st
Bellwoods	Ross McClellan	Member of Provincial Parliament for Bellwoods (1975–1987)		Social worker	5,111		1st
Brampton	David Moulton				6,034		3rd
Burlington South	Michael Wright				4,942		3rd
Don Mills	Michael Lee				4,487		3rd
Dovercourt	Tony Lupusella	Member of Provincial Parliament for Dovercourt (1975–1990)			5,491		1st
Downsview	Odoardo Di Santo	Member of Provincial Parliament for Downsview (1975–1985)		Paralegal	8,644		1st
Durham East	Bruce McArthur				8,648		2nd
Durham West	Hugh Peacock				6,578		3rd
Durham—York	Margaret Wilbur				4,314		3rd
Eglinton	Eileen Elmy				3,324		3rd
Etobicoke	Ed Philip	Member of Provincial Parliament for Etobicoke (1975–1987)	Rexdale, Toronto		10,373		1st
Halton—Burlington	Chris Cutler				3,500		3rd
High Park—Swansea	Ed Ziemba				8,793		2nd
Humber	Jacquie Chic				3,583		3rd
Lakeshore	Donald Sullivan				9,375		2nd
Mississauga East	Douglas Bennett				4,829		3rd
Mississauga North	Sylvia Weylie				6,667		3rd
Mississauga South	Harry Davis				4,126		3rd
Oakville	Zona Hollingsworth				2,562		3rd
Oakwood	Tony Grande	Member of Provincial Parliament for Oakwood (1975–1987)		Teacher	10,307		1st
Oriole	Lynn McDonald				4,443		3rd
Oshawa	Michael Breaugh	Member of Provincial Parliament for Oshawa (1975–1990)		Teacher	12,686		1st
Parkdale	Jan Dukszta				6,020		2nd
Riverdale	Jim Renwick			Lawyer	6,770		1st
Scarborough Centre	Paul Rook				4,898		2nd
Scarborough East	Gordon Wilson				4,826		3rd
Scarborough—Ellesmere	David Warner	Member of Provincial Parliament for Scarborough—Ellesmere (1975–1981)		Teacher	9,720		2nd
Scarborough North	Jerry Daca				6,512		3rd
Scarborough West	Richard Johnston	Member of Provincial Parliament for Scarborough West (1979–1990)		Social worker	10,019		1st
St. Andrew—St. Patrick	Stanley Kutz				3,709		3rd
St. David	Tyrone Turner				5,985		3rd
St. George	Daniel Leckie				4,999		2nd
Wilson Heights	Greg Ioannou				3,623		3rd
York East	Lois Cox				4,935		2nd
York Mills	David Crisp				3,858		3rd
York South	Donald C. MacDonald				9,518		1st
York West	Pauline Durning				2,865		3rd
Yorkview	Michael Morrone				8,973		2nd

== Hamilton/Niagara ==
Riding	Candidate's Name	Notes	Residence	Occupation	Votes	%	Rank
Brock	Heather Kilty				4,204		3rd
Erie	Barrie MacLeod				3,586		3rd
Hamilton Centre	Michael Davison			Journalist	6,930		2nd
Hamilton East	Robert W. Mackenzie	Member of Provincial Parliament for Hamilton East (1975–1995)		Union leader (United Steelworkers)	12,773		1st
Hamilton Mountain	Brian Charlton	Member of Provincial Parliament for Hamilton Mountain (1977–1995)	Hamilton	Property assessor	11,008		1st
Hamilton West	Joy Warner				4,255		3rd
Lincoln	Paavo Vuorinen				2,009		3rd
Niagara Falls	Richard Harrington				4,665		3rd
St. Catharines	Donald Loucks				4,927		3rd
Welland–Thorold	Mel Swart	Member of Provincial Parliament for Welland–Thorold (1977–1988); Member of Provincial Parliament for Welland (1975–1977); Mayor of Thorold (1955–1965); Member of Thorold Town Council (1948–1954)			13,379		1st
Wentworth	Colin Isaacs				9,864		2nd
Wentworth North	Johann Orr				4,702		3rd

== Northern Ontario ==
Riding	Candidate's Name	Notes	Residence	Occupation	Votes	%	Rank
Algoma	Bud Wildman	Member of Provincial Parliament for Algoma (1975–1999)	Echo Bay	Teacher	7,096		1st
Algoma—Manitoulin	Peter Boychuck				2,336		3rd
Cochrane North	Emil Touchette				4,426		3rd
Cochrane South	Clifford Simpson				2,777		2nd
Fort William	Paul Lannon				7,585		2nd
Kenora	Colin Wasacase				4,170		2nd
Lake Nipigon	Jack Stokes				7,846		1st
Nickel Belt	Floyd Laughren	Member of Provincial Parliament for Nickel Belt (1971–1998)	Sudbury	Professor at Cambrian College	8,451		1st
Nipissing	Arthur Peltomaa				1,774		3rd
Parry Sound	Arthur Davis				1,448		3rd
Port Arthur	Jim Foulds	Member of Provincial Parliament for Port Arthur (1971–1987)		Teacher	12,258		1st
Rainy River	Alan Tibbetts				2,438		3rd
Sault Ste. Marie	Susan Brothers				7,162		3rd
Sudbury	Bud Germa				8,052		2nd
Sudbury East	Elie Martel	Member of Provincial Parliament for Sudbury East (1967–1987)	Sudbury	Teacher	13,883		1st
Timiskaming	Robert Bain			Farmer	6,768		2nd

== Southwestern Ontario ==
Riding	Candidate's Name	Notes	Residence	Occupation	Votes	%	Rank
Brant—Oxford—Norfolk	William Jefferies				2,899		3rd
Brantford	Mac Makarchuk				9,588		2nd
Cambridge	Monty Davidson				11,748		2nd
Chatham—Kent	Ronald Franko				6,508		2nd
Elgin	James Campbell				3,250		3rd
Essex North	Marcel Lefebvre				5,911		2nd
Essex South	Blake Sanford				4,349		4th
Grey	Joan Stone				1,629		3rd
Grey–Bruce	Frank Butler				1,455		3rd
Haldimand—Norfolk	Lois Berry				3,744		3rd
Huron–Bruce	Tony McQuail				1,979		3rd
Huron–Middlesex	Gwendolyn Pemberton				1,170		3rd
Kent–Elgin	Edward Cutler				1,591		3rd
Kitchener	Ian MacFarlane				4,126		3rd
Kitchener—Wilmot	Hemi Mitic				3,686		3rd
Lambton	Ralph Wensley				1,276		3rd
London Centre	Diane Risler				3,189		3rd
London North	Rene Saumur				3,864		3rd
London South	Dale Green				5,187		3rd
Middlesex	Larry Green				2,155		3rd
Oxford	Wayne Colbran				3,673		3rd
Perth	Scott Wilson				1,881		3rd
Sarnia	Charles Sullivan				5,292		3rd
Waterloo North	W. Needham				3,672		3rd
Wellington—Dufferin—Peel	Mary Chambers				4,650		3rd
Wellington South	Terence Crowley				5,934		3rd
Windsor—Riverside	Dave Cooke	Member of Provincial Parliament for Windsor—Riverside (1977–1997)	Windsor	Social worker	13,626		1st
Windsor—Sandwich	Ted Bounsall				7,315		2nd
Windsor—Walkerville	Ray Simpson				4,988		2nd
