= 1981 Ontario general election =

Canadian provincial election

- March 19, 1981

125 seats in the 32nd Legislative Assembly of Ontario 63 seats needed for a majority
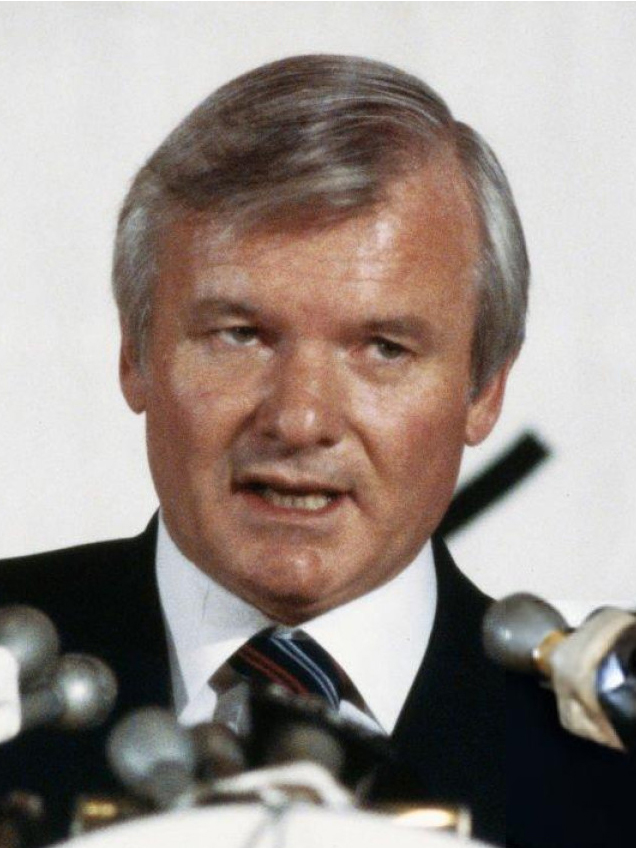

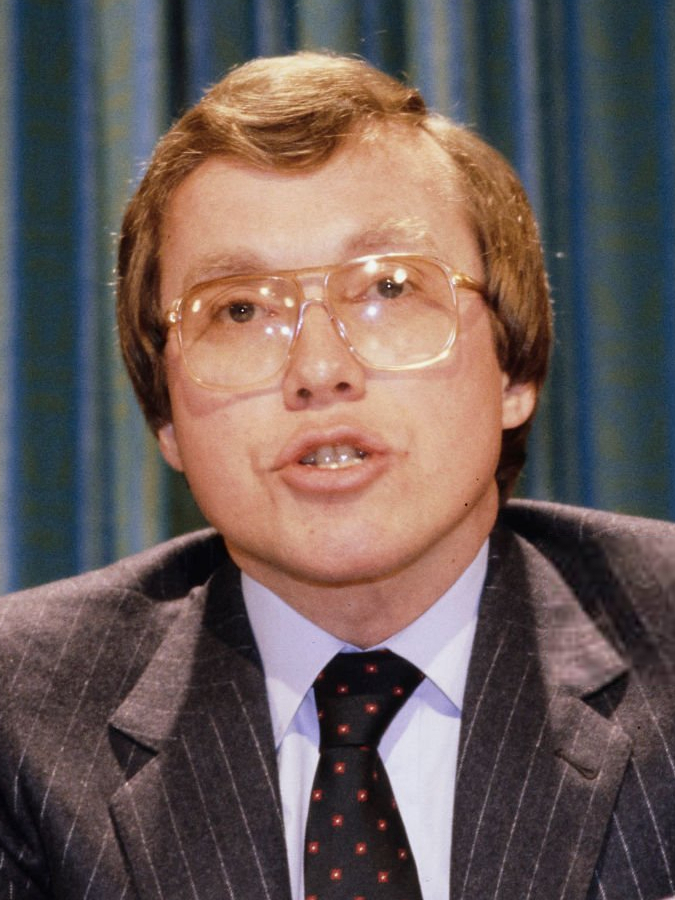
	First party	Second party	Third party
		OLP
Leader	Bill Davis	Stuart Smith	Michael Cassidy
Party	Progressive Conservative	Liberal	New Democratic
Leader since	February 12, 1971	January 25, 1976	February 5, 1978
Leader's seat	Brampton	Hamilton West	Ottawa Centre
Last election	58	33	33
Seats won	70	33	21
Seat change	▲12	0	▼12
Popular vote	1,412,488	1,065,569	672,824
Percentage	44.38%	33.48%	21.14%
Swing	▲4.80pp	▲2.29pp	▼7.02pp
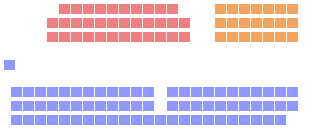
- Seating in chamber after the election
Premier before election
Bill Davis
Progressive Conservative
Premier after election
Bill Davis
Progressive Conservative

The 1981 Ontario general election was held on March 19, 1981, to elect members of the 32nd Legislative Assembly of the Province of Ontario, Canada.

The governing Ontario Progressive Conservative Party, led by Bill Davis, was re-elected for a twelfth consecutive term in office. The PCs finally won a majority government after winning only minorities in the 1975 and 1977 elections. The Liberal Party, led by Stuart Smith, was able to maintain its standing in the Legislature, while the New Democratic Party, led by Michael Cassidy, lost a significant number of seats, allowing the Tories to win a majority.

== Opinion polls ==
=== During campaign period ===
Evolution of voting intentions at provincial level
Polling firm	Last day of survey	Source	PCO	OLP	ONDP	Other	ME	Sample
Election 1981	March 19, 1981		44.38	33.48	21.14			
Gallup	March 11, 1981		51	31	18	—N/a	—N/a	—N/a
Gallup	February 18, 1981		53	27	18	1	—N/a	831
Election called

=== During the 31st Parliament of Ontario ===
Evolution of voting intentions at provincial level
Polling firm	Last day of survey	Source	PCO	OLP	ONDP	Other	ME	Sample
Election 1977	June 9, 1977		39.58	31.19	28.16	1.07		

== Campaign ==
Riding contests, by number of candidates (1981)
Candidates	PC	Lib	LL	NDP	Ind	Comm	Ltn	SC	Un	Total
3	82	80	2	82						246
4	31	31		31	10	10	8	3		124
5	8	8		8	7	6	2		1	40
6	2	2		2	4	1	1			12
7	2	2		2	6	1	1			14
Total	125	123	2	125	27	18	12	3	1	436

A number of unregistered parties also fielded candidates in this election.

There were a number of Rhinoceros Party candidates in the Toronto area, and the party may have also fielded candidates elsewhere in the province. The Workers Communist Party (Marxist–Leninist) a single candidate, Judy Darcy. Ronald G. Rodgers, founder of the Détente Party of Canada, contested a Toronto constituency.

Social Credit leader Reg Gervais announced prior to the election that he planned to run in Nickel Belt, but could not follow through and resigned at a meeting of nominated candidates where John Turmel was appointed interim leader of the Ontario Social Credit Party during the campaign, though there has never been independent confirmation of this (nor is it clear if the Ottawa-area candidacies of Turmel and Raymond Turmel and Serge Girard and Dale Alkerton and Andrew Dynowski were approved by the remaining few members of the official Social Credit Party of Ontario).

== Results ==
Elections to the 32nd Parliament of Ontario (1981)
Political party	Party leader	MPPs				Votes			
Political party	Party leader	Candidates	1977	1981	±	#	±	%	± (pp)
Progressive Conservative	Bill Davis	125	58	70	12▲	1,412,488	89,765▲	44.38%	4.80▲
Liberal	Stuart Smith	123	33	33	Steady	1,065,569	23,115▲	33.48%	2.29▲
Liberal–Labour	Stuart Smith	2	1	1	Steady	7,111	1,131▼	0.22%	0.03▼
New Democratic	Michael Cassidy	125	33	21	12▼	672,824	268,137▼	21.14%	7.02▼
Independent		27	–	–	–	10,585	3,171▲	0.33%	0.11▲
Libertarian	Scott Bell	12	–	–	–	7,087	2,874▼	0.22%	0.08▼
Communist	Mel Doig	18	–	–	–	5,306	2,831▼	0.17%	0.07▼
Social Credit	Reg Gervais	3	–	–	–	1,054	644▼	0.03%	0.02▼
Unparty		1	–	–	–	460	460▲	0.01%	New
Total		436	125	125		3,182,484		100.00%	
Rejected ballots						20,797	1,197▲		
Voter turnout						3,203,281	158,152▼	58.04	7.56▼
Registered electors						5,519,204	395,436▲		

=== Vote and seat summaries ===
Ternary plots - shift of electoral support (1977-1981)
1977

1981
Electoral districts identified by colours of winning parties

Seats and popular vote by party
Party	Seats	Votes	Change (pp)
█ Progressive Conservative	70 / 125	44.38%	4.80
█ Liberal/Liberal-Labour	34 / 125	33.70%	2.26
█ New Democratic	21 / 125	21.14%	-7.02
█ Independent	0 / 125	0.33%	0.11
█ Other	0 / 125	0.45%	-0.15

=== Synopsis of results ===
Results by riding - 1981 Ontario general election
Riding	Winning party						Turnout (Note: including spoilt ballots)	Votes					
Name (Note: order is as given in EO reports)	1977	Party	Votes	Share	Margin #	Margin %	Turnout	PC	Lib/LL	NDP	Ind	Other	Total
Algoma	NDP	NDP	7,096	52.83%	2,326	17.32%	69.22%	4,770	1,567	7,096	–	–	13,433
Algoma—Manitoulin	PC	PC	7,160	57.36%	4,174	33.44%	50.16%	7,160	2,986	2,336	–	–	12,482
Brampton	PC	PC	24,973	61.23%	15,582	38.20%	50.73%	24,973	9,391	6,034	–	390	40,788
Brantford	NDP	PC	12,847	45.35%	3,259	11.50%	59.43%	12,847	5,896	9,588	–	–	28,331
Brant—Oxford—Norfolk	Lib	Lib	13,067	59.40%	7,033	31.97%	55.64%	6,034	13,067	2,899	–	–	22,000
Brock	PC	PC	10,547	48.75%	3,665	16.94%	60.36%	10,547	6,882	4,204	–	–	21,633
Burlington South	PC	PC	19,037	57.81%	10,084	30.62%	55.69%	19,037	8,953	4,942	–	–	32,932
Cambridge	NDP	PC	12,597	42.82%	849	2.89%	59.32%	12,597	4,527	11,748	549	–	29,421
Carleton	PC	PC	17,846	55.26%	9,225	28.56%	53.22%	17,846	8,621	5,446	–	383	32,296
Carleton East	NDP	PC	15,714	38.03%	1,686	4.08%	59.37%	15,714	14,028	11,579	–	–	41,321
Carleton-Grenville	PC	PC	15,202	65.09%	9,438	40.41%	57.71%	15,202	5,764	2,391	–	–	23,357
Chatham—Kent	PC	PC	9,471	42.20%	2,963	13.20%	54.47%	9,471	6,466	6,508	–	–	22,445
Cochrane North	PC	PC	5,910	36.19%	188	1.15%	62.56%	5,910	5,722	4,426	–	274	16,332
Cochrane South	PC	PC	12,540	56.25%	5,565	24.96%	61.65%	12,540	6,975	2,777	–	–	22,292
Cornwall	NDP	NDP	9,484	41.90%	1,667	7.37%	63.65%	7,817	5,333	9,484	–	–	22,634
Dufferin—Simcoe	PC	PC	18,101	62.83%	11,399	39.57%	56.41%	18,101	6,702	4,007	–	–	28,810
Durham East	PC	PC	14,900	48.02%	6,252	20.15%	60.46%	14,900	7,226	8,648	253	–	31,027
Durham West	PC	PC	17,029	52.77%	9,583	29.70%	55.46%	17,029	7,446	6,578	–	1,215	32,268
Durham—York	PC	PC	14,404	57.51%	8,074	32.23%	56.99%	14,404	6,330	4,314	–	–	25,048
Elgin	PC	PC	13,119	55.41%	5,813	24.55%	58.78%	13,119	7,306	3,250	–	–	23,675
Erie	Lib	Lib	8,796	49.83%	3,525	19.97%	54.59%	5,271	8,796	3,586	–	–	17,653
Essex North	Lib	Lib	9,187	46.14%	3,276	16.45%	54.47%	4,812	9,187	5,911	–	–	19,910
Essex South	Lib	Lib	10,454	52.77%	5,446	27.49%	51.18%	5,008	10,454	4,349	–	–	19,811
Fort William	PC	PC	13,038	54.32%	5,453	22.72%	59.66%	13,038	3,381	7,585	–	–	24,004
Frontenac—Addington	Lib	Lib	10,558	44.21%	340	1.42%	62.89%	10,218	10,558	2,374	409	322	23,881
Grey	Lib	Lib	13,334	55.47%	4,541	18.89%	64.77%	8,793	13,334	1,629	–	284	24,040
Grey—Bruce	Lib	Lib	14,006	60.30%	6,239	26.86%	64.36%	7,767	14,006	1,455	–	–	23,228
Haldimand—Norfolk	Lib	Lib	16,254	56.49%	7,479	25.99%	63.08%	8,775	16,254	3,744	–	–	28,773
Halton—Burlington	Lib	Lib	13,395	44.99%	518	1.74%	56.33%	12,877	13,395	3,500	–	–	29,772
Hamilton Centre	NDP	Lib	9,734	47.02%	2,804	13.54%	55.58%	4,039	9,734	6,930	–	–	20,703
Hamilton East	NDP	NDP	12,773	46.47%	4,408	16.04%	55.02%	6,351	8,365	12,773	–	–	27,489
Hamilton Mountain	NDP	NDP	11,008	35.77%	197	0.64%	67.02%	10,811	8,956	11,008	–	–	30,775
Hamilton West	Lib	Lib	12,106	45.84%	2,318	8.78%	60.46%	9,788	12,106	4,255	–	260	26,409
Hastings—Peterborough	PC	PC	11,528	49.61%	2,787	11.99%	66.49%	11,528	8,741	2,968	–	–	23,237
Huron—Bruce	Lib	Lib	12,164	46.64%	224	0.86%	70.22%	11,940	12,164	1,979	–	–	26,083
Huron—Middlesex	Lib	Lib	10,707	52.24%	2,089	10.19%	66.57%	8,618	10,707	1,170	–	–	20,495
Kenora	PC	PC	10,418	60.84%	6,248	36.49%	57.94%	10,418	2,536	4,170	–	–	17,124
Kent—Elgin	Lib	Lib	10,115	47.08%	337	1.57%	64.40%	9,778	10,115	1,591	–	–	21,484
Kingston and the Islands	PC	PC	12,488	50.25%	4,023	16.19%	58.10%	12,488	8,465	3,897	–	–	24,850
Kitchener	Lib	Lib	12,592	50.98%	4,610	18.66%	50.86%	7,982	12,592	4,126	–	–	24,700
Kitchener—Wilmot	Lib	Lib	11,515	48.56%	3,002	12.66%	49.49%	8,513	11,515	3,686	–	–	23,714
Lake Nipigon	NDP	NDP	7,846	68.90%	6,018	52.85%	55.75%	1,828	1,714	7,846	–	–	11,388
Lambton	PC	PC	13,467	63.59%	7,032	33.20%	66.04%	13,467	6,435	1,276	–	–	21,178
Lanark	PC	PC	10,502	61.69%	6,638	38.99%	55.80%	10,502	3,864	2,659	–	–	17,025
Leeds	PC	PC	13,725	64.41%	9,082	42.62%	58.54%	13,725	4,643	2,940	–	–	21,308
Lincoln	Lib	PC	10,044	46.28%	394	1.82%	65.54%	10,044	9,650	2,009	–	–	21,703
London Centre	Lib	Lib	12,315	51.67%	3,986	16.72%	49.65%	8,329	12,315	3,189	–	–	23,833
London North	Lib	Lib	15,444	49.61%	3,619	11.62%	54.17%	11,825	15,444	3,864	–	–	31,133
London South	PC	PC	19,714	54.74%	8,598	23.87%	52.03%	19,714	11,116	5,187	–	–	36,017
Middlesex	PC	PC	11,672	52.84%	3,408	15.43%	66.01%	11,672	8,264	2,155	–	–	22,091
Mississauga East	PC	PC	15,759	55.68%	8,043	28.42%	50.21%	15,759	7,716	4,829	–	–	28,304
Mississauga North	PC	PC	20,331	56.27%	11,201	31.00%	49.45%	20,331	9,130	6,667	–	–	36,128
Mississauga South	PC	PC	14,165	55.63%	6,993	27.46%	55.59%	14,165	7,172	4,126	–	–	25,463
Muskoka	PC	PC	9,029	55.09%	4,881	29.78%	64.43%	9,029	4,148	3,214	–	–	16,391
Niagara Falls	Lib	Lib	12,495	47.23%	3,200	12.10%	56.32%	9,295	12,495	4,665	–	–	26,455
Nickel Belt	NDP	NDP	8,451	54.85%	3,410	22.13%	63.38%	1,915	5,041	8,451	–	–	15,407
Nipissing	Lib	PC	15,795	55.43%	4,871	17.10%	64.11%	15,795	10,924	1,774	–	–	28,493
Northumberland	PC	PC	14,727	51.58%	3,614	12.66%	65.02%	14,727	11,113	2,711	–	–	28,551
Oakville	PC	PC	16,366	62.43%	9,080	34.64%	56.58%	16,366	7,286	2,562	–	–	26,214
Oshawa	NDP	NDP	10,307	48.04%	2,471	11.52%	49.70%	7,836	3,311	10,307	–	–	21,454
Ottawa Centre	NDP	NDP	9,316	36.77%	599	2.36%	54.58%	8,717	6,926	9,316	376	–	25,335
Ottawa East	Lib	Lib	14,207	69.22%	9,972	48.59%	49.03%	4,235	14,207	1,905	–	177	20,524
Ottawa South	PC	PC	15,218	49.97%	6,386	20.97%	60.22%	15,218	8,832	6,146	259	–	30,455
Ottawa West	PC	PC	17,418	59.30%	8,306	28.28%	55.86%	17,418	9,112	2,348	–	494	29,372
Oxford	PC	PC	15,948	49.87%	4,082	12.76%	61.57%	15,948	11,866	3,673	–	493	31,980
Parry Sound	PC	PC	8,955	46.27%	6	0.03%	66.87%	8,955	8,949	1,448	–	–	19,352
Perth	Lib	Lib	16,283	62.51%	8,400	32.25%	58.88%	7,883	16,283	1,881	–	–	26,047
Peterborough	PC	PC	17,962	45.92%	6,699	17.13%	63.06%	17,962	11,263	8,756	345	787	39,113
Port Arthur	NDP	NDP	12,258	46.10%	1,414	5.32%	61.22%	10,844	3,247	12,258	140	103	26,592
Prescott and Russell	PC	Lib	15,123	56.22%	5,172	19.23%	60.83%	9,951	15,123	1,828	–	–	26,902
Prince Edward—Lennox	PC	PC	11,135	57.53%	4,338	22.41%	61.18%	11,135	6,797	1,423	–	–	19,355
Quinte	Lib	Lib	14,861	56.78%	5,344	20.42%	56.08%	9,517	14,861	1,795	–	–	26,173
Rainy River	LL	LL	4,575	40.99%	426	3.82%	61.50%	4,149	4,575 (Note: T. Patrick Reid was the incumbent)	2,438	–	–	11,162
Renfrew North	Lib	Lib	9,113	52.57%	1,976	11.40%	58.18%	7,137	9,113	1,086	–	–	17,336
Renfrew South	PC	PC	14,552	55.66%	4,132	15.80%	71.09%	14,552	10,420	1,174	–	–	26,146
St. Catharines	Lib	Lib	16,509	51.85%	6,236	19.58%	57.20%	10,273	16,509	4,927	–	132	31,841
Sarnia	Lib	PC	13,871	46.23%	3,029	10.09%	63.27%	13,871	10,842	5,292	–	–	30,005
Sault Ste. Marie	PC	PC	14,712	49.99%	7,157	24.32%	54.29%	14,712	7,555	7,162	–	–	29,429
Simcoe Centre	PC	PC	16,926	49.84%	4,421	13.02%	59.06%	16,926	12,505	4,532	–	–	33,963
Simcoe East	PC	PC	12,487	42.13%	3,402	11.48%	64.39%	12,487	7,320	9,085	749	–	29,641
Stormont—Dundas—Glengarry	PC	PC	12,017	55.38%	4,171	19.22%	65.95%	12,017	7,846	1,836	0	–	21,699
Sudbury	NDP	PC	12,043	45.95%	3,991	15.23%	62.72%	12,043	5,998	8,052	–	115	26,208
Sudbury East	NDP	NDP	13,883	49.21%	4,463	15.82%	58.94%	9,420	4,909	13,883	–	–	28,212
Timiskaming	PC	PC	8,377	44.71%	1,609	8.59%	65.03%	8,377	3,593	6,768	–	–	18,738
Victoria—Haliburton	Lib	Lib	12,807	49.71%	2,298	8.92%	62.92%	10,509	12,807	2,449	–	–	25,765
Waterloo North	Lib	Lib	12,843	49.17%	3,237	12.39%	52.30%	9,606	12,843	3,672	–	–	26,121
Welland-Thorold	NDP	NDP	13,379	49.81%	5,463	20.34%	64.78%	5,564	7,916	13,379	–	–	26,859
Wellington—Dufferin—Peel	PC	PC	16,644	56.55%	8,508	28.91%	58.51%	16,644	8,136	4,650	–	–	29,430
Wellington South	Lib	Lib	16,237	53.57%	8,320	27.45%	56.86%	7,917	16,237	5,934	–	224	30,312
Wentworth	NDP	PC	10,024	34.88%	160	0.56%	62.32%	10,024	8,847	9,864	–	–	28,735
Wentworth North	Lib	Lib	16,433	49.13%	4,121	12.32%	63.98%	12,312	16,433	4,702	–	–	33,447
Windsor—Riverside	NDP	NDP	13,626	49.59%	4,524	16.46%	56.31%	4,418	9,102	13,626	333	–	27,479
Windsor—Sandwich	NDP	Lib	7,449	40.26%	134	0.72%	48.34%	3,479	7,449	7,315	–	258	18,501
Windsor—Walkerville	Lib	Lib	10,553	54.89%	5,565	28.94%	51.29%	3,438	10,553	4,988	–	248	19,227
York Centre	Lib	PC	19,094	47.54%	1,722	4.29%	56.81%	19,094	17,372	3,701	–	–	40,167
York North	PC	PC	18,405	55.38%	8,189	24.64%	54.20%	18,405	10,216	4,614	–	–	33,235
Armourdale	PC	PC	15,938	54.63%	6,941	23.79%	60.64%	15,938	8,997	4,240	–	–	29,175
Beaches—Woodbine	NDP	NDP	9,590	43.10%	324	1.46%	59.24%	9,266	3,140	9,590	252	–	22,248
Bellwoods	NDP	NDP	5,111	40.99%	365	2.93%	58.75%	2,186	4,746	5,111	180	246	12,469
Don Mills	PC	PC	17,516	63.99%	12,148	44.38%	52.55%	17,516	5,368	4,487	–	–	27,371
Dovercourt	NDP	NDP	5,491	37.81%	294	2.02%	62.62%	3,416	5,197	5,491	258	162	14,524
Downsview	NDP	NDP	8,644	39.10%	653	2.95%	58.54%	5,475	7,991	8,644	–	–	22,110
Eglinton	PC	PC	17,386	64.92%	11,780	43.98%	57.86%	17,386	5,606	3,324	–	466	26,782
Etobicoke	NDP	NDP	10,373	40.63%	2,349	9.20%	55.31%	8,024	7,132	10,373	–	–	25,529
High Park—Swansea	NDP	PC	11,473	47.01%	2,680	10.98%	64.63%	11,473	3,635	8,793	–	507	24,408
Humber	PC	PC	20,844	60.43%	10,780	31.25%	59.93%	20,844	10,064	3,583	–	–	34,491
Lakeshore	NDP	PC	10,607	40.65%	1,232	4.72%	61.06%	10,607	5,738	9,375	–	376	26,096
Oakwood	NDP	NDP	8,862	45.17%	2,901	14.79%	56.22%	5,961	4,171	8,862	–	624	19,618
Oriole	PC	PC	15,644	49.68%	4,244	13.48%	57.65%	15,644	11,400	4,443	–	–	31,487
Parkdale	NDP	Lib	6,941	42.26%	921	5.61%	58.59%	2,914	6,941	6,020	289	259	16,423
Riverdale	NDP	NDP	6,770	46.73%	2,682	18.51%	49.62%	4,088	3,237	6,770	233	158	14,486
St. Andrew—St. Patrick	PC	PC	10,674	49.10%	3,835	17.64%	57.09%	10,674	6,839	3,709	368	148	21,738
St. David	PC	PC	9,627	39.36%	1,022	4.18%	64.80%	9,627	8,605	5,985	243	–	24,460
St. George	Lib	PC	12,390	43.00%	4,251	14.75%	58.69%	12,390	8,139	4,999	2,928	359	28,815
Scarborough Centre	PC	PC	12,793	55.92%	7,895	34.51%	53.07%	12,793	4,657	4,898	–	531	22,879
Scarborough East	PC	PC	16,386	56.03%	9,085	31.06%	55.46%	16,386	7,301	4,826	171	562	29,246
Scarborough—Ellesmere	NDP	PC	11,608	44.87%	1,888	7.30%	60.27%	11,608	4,545	9,720	–	–	25,873
Scarborough North	PC	PC	29,961	60.98%	17,298	35.20%	53.08%	29,961	12,663	6,512	–	–	49,136
Scarborough West	NDP	NDP	10,019	41.84%	375	1.57%	59.17%	9,644	3,914	10,019	369	–	23,946
Wilson Heights	PC	PC	11,722	48.55%	2,925	12.12%	51.83%	11,722	8,797	3,623	–	–	24,142
York East	PC	PC	14,562	57.34%	9,627	37.91%	57.13%	14,562	4,811	4,935	–	1,088	25,396
York Mills	PC	PC	20,613	65.59%	14,946	47.56%	53.61%	20,613	5,667	3,858	–	1,287	31,425
York South	NDP	NDP	9,518	37.01%	1,419	5.52%	59.75%	7,628	8,099	9,518	–	472	25,717
York West	PC	PC	18,501	57.58%	8,273	25.75%	58.22%	18,501	10,228	2,865	538	–	32,132
Yorkview	NDP	Lib	10,160	38.62%	1,187	4.51%	55.03%	5,329	10,160	8,973	1,343	503	26,308

= open seat
= turnout is above provincial average
= winning candidate was in previous Legislature
= not incumbent; was previously elected to the Legislature
= incumbent had switched allegiance
= incumbency arose from byelection gain
= previously incumbent in another riding
= Liberal-Labour candidate
= other incumbents renominated
= multiple candidates

=== Analysis ===
Party candidates in 2nd place
Party in 1st place	Party in 2nd place			Total
Party in 1st place	PC	Lib	NDP	Total
Progressive Conservative		55	15	70
Liberal	27		6	33
Liberal–Labour	1			1
New Democratic	13	8		21
Total	41	63	21	125

Candidates ranked 1st to 5th place, by party
Parties	1st	2nd	3rd	4th	5th
█ Progressive Conservative	70	41	14		
█ Liberal	33	63	27		
█ New Democratic	21	21	83		
█ Liberal–Labour	1		1		
█ Independent				18	3
█ Communist				12	6
█ Libertarian				10	2
█ Social Credit				3	
█ Unparty					1

Resulting composition of the 28th Legislative Assembly
Source		Party				
Source		PC	Lib	LL	NDP	Total
Seats retained	Incumbents returned	47	27	1	21	102
Seats retained	Open seats held	10	1			11
Seats changing hands	Incumbents defeated	11	4			15
Seats changing hands	Open seats gained	2	1			3
Total		70	33	1	21	125

=== Seats changing hands ===
Eighteen seats changed allegiance in this election:

PC to Liberal

- Prescott and Russell

Liberal to PC

- Lincoln
- Nipissing
- St. George
- Sarnia
- York Centre

NDP to PC

- Brantford
- Cambridge
- Carleton East
- High Park—Swansea
- Lakeshore
- Scarborough—Ellesmere
- Sudbury
- Wentworth

NDP to PC

- Hamilton Centre
- Parkdale
- Windsor—Sandwich
- Yorkview

=== MPPs elected by region and riding ===
Party designations are as follows:

PC
Liberal
NDP
Liberal-Labour

Northern Ontario

- Algoma: Bud Wildman
- Algoma—Manitoulin : John Lane
- Cochrane North: René Piché
- Cochrane South: Alan Pope
- Fort William: Mickey Hennessy
- Kenora: Leo Bernier
- Lake Nipigon: Jack Stokes
- Nickel Belt: Floyd Laughren
- Nipissing: Mike Harris
- Port Arthur: Jim Foulds
- Rainy River: T. Patrick Reid
- Sault Ste. Marie: Russ Ramsay
- Sudbury: Jim Gordon
- Sudbury East: Elie Martel
- Timiskaming: Ed Havrot

Ottawa Valley

- Carleton: Robert C. Mitchell
- Carleton East: Bob MacQuarrie
- Lanark: Douglas Wiseman
- Ottawa Centre: Michael Cassidy
- Ottawa East: Albert Roy
- Ottawa South: Claude Bennett
- Ottawa West: Reuben Baetz
- Prescott and Russell: Don Boudria
- Renfrew North: Sean Conway
- Renfrew South: Paul Yakabuski

Saint Lawrence Valley

- Carleton—Grenville: Norm Sterling
- Cornwall: George Samis
- Kingston and the Islands: Keith Norton
- Leeds: Bob Runciman
- Stormont—Dundas—Glengarry: Osie Villeneuve

Central Ontario

- Frontenac—Addington: J. Earl McEwen
- Hastings-Peterborough: Jim Pollock
- Northumberland: Howard Sheppard
- Peterborough: John Turner
- Prince Edward—Lennox: James A. Taylor
- Quinte: Hugh O'Neil
- Victoria—Haliburton: John Eakins

Georgian Bay

- Grey-Bruce: Eddie Sargent
- Muskoka: Frank Miller
- Parry Sound: Ernie Eves
- Simcoe Centre: George Taylor
- Simcoe East: Al McLean

Hamilton/Halton/Niagara

- Brock: Bob Welch
- Burlington South: George Kerr
- Erie: Ray Haggerty
- Halton—Burlington: Julian Reed
- Hamilton Centre: Sheila Copps
- Hamilton East: Robert W. Mackenzie
- Hamilton Mountain: Brian Charlton
- Hamilton West: Stuart Smith
- Lincoln: Philip Andrewes
- Niagara Falls: Vince Kerrio
- Oakville: James Snow
- St. Catharines: Jim Bradley
- Welland-Thorold: Mel Swart
- Wentworth: Gordon Howlett Dean
- Wentworth North: Eric Cunningham

Midwestern Ontario

- Brantford: Phil Gillies
- Brant—Oxford—Norfolk: Robert Nixon
- Cambridge: Bill Barlow
- Dufferin—Simcoe: George McCague
- Grey: Bob McKessock
- Haldimand-Norfolk: Gordon Miller
- Huron–Bruce: Murray Elston
- Kitchener: Jim Breithaupt
- Kitchener—Wilmot: John Sweeney
- Oxford: Dick Treleaven
- Perth: Hugh Edighoffer
- Waterloo North: Herb Epp
- Wellington South: Harry Worton
- Wellington—Dufferin—Peel: Jack Johnson

Southwestern Ontario

- Chatham—Kent: Andrew Naismith Watson
- Elgin: Ron McNeil
- Essex North: Dick Ruston
- Essex South: Remo Mancini
- Huron–Middlesex: Jack Riddell
- Kent—Elgin: Jim McGuigan
- Lambton: Lorne Henderson
- London Centre: David Peterson
- London North: Ron Van Horne
- London South: Gordon Walker
- Middlesex: Robert G. Eaton
- Sarnia: Andy Brandt
- Windsor—Riverside: Dave Cooke
- Windsor—Sandwich: Bill Wrye
- Windsor—Walkerville: Bernard Newman

Peel/York/Durham

- Brampton: Bill Davis
- Durham East: Sam Cureatz
- Durham West: George Ashe
- Durham—York: K. Ross Stevenson
- Mississauga East: Bud Gregory
- Mississauga North: Terry David Jones
- Mississauga South: Douglas Kennedy
- Oshawa: Michael Breaugh
- York Centre: W. Donald Cousens
- York North: William Hodgson

Metropolitan Toronto

- Armourdale: Bruce McCaffrey
- Beaches—Woodbine: Marion Bryden
- Bellwoods: Ross McClellan
- Don Mills: Dennis Timbrell
- Dovercourt: Tony Lupusella
- Downsview: Odoardo Di Santo
- Eglinton: Roy McMurtry
- Etobicoke: Ed Philip
- High Park—Swansea: Yuri Shymko
- Humber: Morley Kells
- Lakeshore: Al Kolyn
- Oakwood: Tony Grande
- Oriole: John Williams
- Parkdale: Tony Ruprecht
- Riverdale: Jim Renwick
- St. Andrew—St. Patrick: Larry Grossman
- St. David: Margaret Scrivener
- St. George: Susan Fish
- Scarborough Centre: Frank Drea
- Scarborough East: Margaret Birch
- Scarborough North: Thomas Wells
- Scarborough West: Richard Johnston
- Scarborough—Ellesmere: Alan Robinson
- Wilson Heights: David Rotenberg
- York East: Robert Elgie
- York Mills: Bette Stephenson
- York South: Donald C. MacDonald
- York West: Nick Leluk
- Yorkview: Michael Spensieri

== Constituency results ==
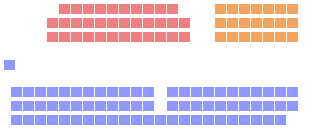

Algoma:

- (incumbent) Bud Wildman (NDP) 7096
- Vyrn Peterson (PC) 4770
- Dan Koob (L) 1567

Algoma—Manitoulin:

- (incumbent) John Lane (PC) 7160
- Ernest Massicotte (L) 2986
- Peter Boychuk (NDP) 2336

Armourdale:

- (incumbent) Bruce McCaffrey (PC) 15938
- Tim Rutledge (L) 8997
- Bob Hebdon (NDP) 4240

Beaches—Woodbine:

- (incumbent) Marion Bryden (NDP) 9590
- Paul Christie (PC) 9266
- Wayne Cook (L) 3140
- Rhino Flosznik (Ind [Rhinoceros]) 252

Bellwoods:

- (incumbent) Ross McClellan (NDP) 5111
- Walter Bardyn (L) 4746
- Tina Gabriel (PC) 2186
- Sylvie Baillargeon (Comm) 246
- Ronald G. Rodgers (Ind [Détente Party]) 180

Brampton:

- (incumbent) Bill Davis (PC) 24973
- Bob Callahan (L) 9391
- David Moulton (NDP) 6034
- Jim Bridgewood (Comm) 390

Brantford:

- Phil Gillies (PC) 12847
- (incumbent) Mac Makarchuk (NDP) 9588
- Herb German (L) 5896

Brant—Oxford—Haldimand:

- (incumbent) Robert Nixon (L) 13067
- Ian Birnie (PC) 6034
- W.E. Jefferies (NDP) 2899

Brock:

- (incumbent) Bob Welch (PC) 10547
- Bill Andres (L) 6882
- Heather Lee Kilty (NDP) 4204

Burlington South:

- (incumbent) George Kerr (PC) 19037
- Pearl Cameron (L) 8953
- Michael C. Wright (NDP) 4942

Cambridge:

- Bill Barlow (PC) 12597
- (incumbent) Monty Davidson (NDP) 11748
- John Giles (L) 4527
- George Molson Barrett 549

Carleton:

- (incumbent) Bob Mitchell (PC) 17846
- Hans Daigeler (L) 8621
- Judy Wasylycia-Leis (NDP) 5446
- Andrew Dana Dynowski (Ind [SCO]) 383

Carleton East:

- Bob MacQuarrie (PC) 15714
- Bernard Grandmaitre (L) 14028
- (incumbent) Evelyn Gigantes (NDP) 11579

Carleton-Grenville:

- (incumbent) Norm Sterling (PC) 15202
- Paul Raina (L) 5764
- Alan White (NDP) 2391

Chatham—Kent:

- (incumbent) Andy Watson (PC) 9471
- Ron Franko (NDP) 6508
- Darcy Want (L) 6466

Cochrane North:

- René Piché (PC) 5910
- Jean-Paul Bourgeault (L) 5722
- Emil Touchette (NDP) 4426
- Richard Coatsworth (Lbt) 274

Cochrane South:

- (incumbent) Alan Pope (PC) 12540
- John Sullivan (L) 6975
- Cliff Simpson (NDP) 2777

Cornwall:

- (incumbent) George Samis (NDP) 9484
- Jim Kirkey (PC) 7817
- Brian Lynch (L) 5333

Don Mills:

- (incumbent) Dennis Timbrell (PC) 17516
- Murad Velshi (L) 5368
- Michael Lee (NDP) 4487

Dovercourt:

- (incumbent) Tony Lupusella (NDP) 5491
- Gil Gillespie (L) 5197
- John Burigana (PC) 3416
- Vince Corriero (Ind [Independent Liberal]) 258
- Mel Doig (Comm) 162

Downsview:

- (incumbent) Odoardo Di Santo (NDP) 8644
- Joseph Volpe (L) 7991
- Ross Charles (PC) 5475

Dufferin—Simcoe:

- (incumbent) George McCague (PC) 18101
- Larry MacKenzie (L) 6702
- Ed Robinson (NDP) 4007

Durham East:

- (incumbent) Sam Cureatz (PC) 14900
- Bruce McArthur (NDP) 8648
- Jim Potticary (L) 7226
- Jeff Hubbell 253

Durham West:

- (incumbent) George Ashe (PC) 17029
- Norman Wei (L) 7446
- Hugh Peacock (NDP) 6578
- Bill Leslie (Lbt) 1215

Durham—York:

- Ross Stevenson (PC) 14404
- Gary Adamson (L) 6330
- Margaret Wilbur (NDP) 4314

Eglinton:

- (incumbent) Roy McMurtry (PC) 17386
- Keith Polson (L) 5606
- Eileen Elmy (NDP) 3324
- Angelo R. Cosentini (Lbt) 466

Elgin:

- (incumbent) Ron McNeil (PC) 13119
- Maurice Dillon (L) 7306
- Gord Campbell (NDP) 3250

Erie:

- (incumbent) Ray Haggerty (L) 8796
- Cam McKnight (PC) 5271
- Barrie MacLeod (NDP) 3586

Essex North:

- (incumbent) Dick Ruston (L) 9187
- Marcel Lefebvre (NDP) 5911
- Ron Arkell (PC) 4812

Essex South:

- (incumbent) Remo Mancini (L) 10454
- Wayne Patterson (PC) 5008
- Blake Sanford (NDP) 4349

Etobicoke:

- (incumbent) Ed Philip (NDP) 10373
- Aileen Anderson (PC) 8024
- Laureano Leone (L) 7132

Fort William:

- (incumbent) Mickey Hennessy (PC) 13038
- Paul Lannon (NDP) 7585
- Mike Burns (L) 3381

Frontenac—Addington:

- (incumbent) J. Earl McEwen (L) 10558
- Murray Gorham (PC) 10218
- Vincent Maloney (NDP) 2374
- Ross Baker 409
- Sally Hayes (Lbt) 322

Grey:

- (incumbent) Bob McKessock (L) 13334
- John Young (PC) 8793
- Joan Stone (NDP) 1629
- Eric Biggins (Lbt) 284

Grey—Bruce:

- (incumbent) Eddie Sargent (L) 14006
- Bob Rutherford (PC) 7767
- Frank Butler (NDP) 1455

Haldimand—Norfolk:

- (incumbent) Gordon Miller (L) 16254
- Clarence Abbott (PC) 8775
- Lois Berry (NDP) 3744

Halton—Burlington:

- (incumbent) Julian Reed (L) 13395
- Fran Baines (PC) 12877
- Chris Cutler (NDP) 3500

Hamilton Centre:

- Sheila Copps (L) 9734
- (incumbent) Mike Davison (NDP) 6930
- Brenda Riis (PC) 4039

Hamilton East:

- (incumbent) Robert W. Mackenzie (NDP) 12773
- Mike Riley (L) 8365
- Gabe Macaluso (PC) 6351

Hamilton Mountain:

- (incumbent) Brian Charlton (NDP) 11008
- Duncan Beattie (PC) 10811
- Vince Agro (L) 8956

Hamilton West:

- (incumbent) Stuart Smith (L) 12106
- Alec Murray (PC) 9788
- Joy Warner (NDP) 4255
- Elizabeth Rowley (Comm) 260

Hastings—Peterborough:

- Jim Pollock (PC) 11528
- Dave Hobson (L) 8741
- Elmer Buchanan (NDP) 2968

High Park—Swansea:

- Yuri Shymko (PC) 11473
- (incumbent) Ed Ziemba (NDP) 8793
- Peter C. Simonelis (L) 3635
- Bob Cumming (Lbt) 507

Humber:

- Morley Kells (PC) 20844
- Jim Mills (L) 10064
- Jacquie Chic (NDP) 3583

Huron—Bruce:

- Murray Elston (L) 12164
- Gary Harron (PC) 11940
- Tony McQuail (NDP) 1979

Huron—Middlesex:

- (incumbent) Jack Riddell (L) 10707
- Jim Britnell (PC) 8618
- Gwen Pemberton (NDP) 1170

Kenora:

- (incumbent) Leo Bernier (PC) 10418
- Colin Wasacase (NDP) 4170
- Jeff Holmes (Liberal-Labour) 2536

Kent—Elgin:

- (incumbent) Jim McGuigan (L) 10115
- Wes Thompson (PC) 9778
- Ed Cutler (NDP) 1591

Kingston and the Islands:

- (incumbent) Keith Norton (PC) 12488
- Carl Ross (L) 8465
- Ron Murray (NDP) 3897

Kitchener:

- (incumbent) Jim Breithaupt (L) 12592
- Morley Rosenberg (PC) 7982
- Ian MacFarlane (NDP) 4126

Kitchener—Wilmot:

- (incumbent) John Sweeney (L) 11515
- Alan Barron (PC) 8513
- Hemi Mitic (NDP) 3686

Lake Nipigon:

- (incumbent) Jack Stokes (NDP) 7846
- John Paziuk (PC) 1828
- John Lentowicz (L) 1714

Lambton:

- (incumbent) Lorne Henderson (PC) 13467
- Leigh Crozier (L) 6435
- Ralph Wensley (NDP) 1276

Lanark—Renfrew:

- (incumbent) Douglas Wiseman (PC) 10502
- Ray Matthey (L) 3864
- Cliff Bennett (NDP) 2659

Lakeshore:

- Al Kolyn (PC) 10607
- Don Sullivan (NDP) 9375
- Bill Whelton (L) 5738
- Gordon Flowers (Comm) 376

Leeds:

- Bob Runciman (PC) 13725
- John Fournell (L) 4643
- Bob Smith (NDP) 2940

Lincoln:

- Philip Andrewes (PC) 10044
- (incumbent) Ross Hall (L) 9650
- Paavo Vuorinen (NDP) 2009

London Centre:

- (incumbent) David Peterson (L) 12315
- Russ Monteith (PC) 8329
- Diane Risler (NDP) 3189

London North:

- (incumbent) Ron Van Horne (L) 15444
- Ted Browne (PC) 11825
- Sam Saumur (NDP) 3864

London South:

- (incumbent) Gordon Walker (PC) 19714
- Frank Green (L) 11116
- Dale Green (NDP) 5187

Middlesex:

- (incumbent) Robert G. Eaton (PC) 11672
- Bob Coulthard (L) 8264
- Larry Green (NDP) 2155

Mississauga East:

- (incumbent) Bud Gregory (PC) 15759
- Murray Schelter (L) 7716
- Doug Bennett (NDP) 4829

Mississauga North:

- (incumbent) Terry Jones (PC) 20331
- John Brooks (L) 9130
- Sylvia Weylie (NDP) 6667

Mississauga South:

- (incumbent) Douglas Kennedy (PC) 14165
- Basil Gerol (L) 7172
- Neil Davis (NDP) 4126

Muskoka:

- (incumbent) Frank Miller (PC) 9029
- Ken McClellan (L) 4148
- Jim Maguire (NDP) 3214

Niagara Falls:

- (incumbent) Vince Kerrio (L) 12495
- Ted Salci (PC) 9295
- Dick Harrington (NDP) 4665

Nickel Belt:

- (incumbent) Floyd Laughren (NDP) 8451
- Elmer Sopha (L) 5041
- Andre Lalande (PC) 1915

Nipissing:

- Mike Harris (PC) 15795
- (incumbent) Mike Bolan (L) 10924
- Art Peltomaa (NDP) 1774

Northumberland:

- Howard Sheppard (PC) 14727
- William A. Wyatt (L) 11113
- Ben Burd (NDP) 2711

Oakville:

- (incumbent) James W. Snow (PC) 16366
- Walt Elliot (L) 7286
- Zona Hollingsworth (NDP) 2562

Oakwood:

- (incumbent) Tony Grande (NDP) 8862
- Harriet Wolman (PC) 5961
- Jean Gammage (L) 4171
- Nan McDonald (Comm) 624

Oriole:

- (incumbent) John Williams (PC) 15644
- David Pretty (L) 11400
- Lynn McDonald (NDP) 4443

Oshawa:

- (incumbent) Michael Breaugh (NDP) 10307
- Bob Boychyn (PC) 7836
- Ivan Wallace (L) 3311

Ottawa Centre:

- (incumbent) Michael Cassidy (NDP) 9316
- David Small (PC) 8717
- Karl Feige (L) 6926
- John Turmel (Ind [SCO]) 376

Ottawa East:

- (incumbent) Albert J. Roy (L) 14207
- Omer Deslauriers (PC) 4235
- Danielle Page (NDP) 1905
- Serge Girard (Ind [SCO]) 177

Ottawa South:

- (incumbent) Claude Bennett (PC) 15218
- Robert Dyck (L) 8832
- Chris Chilton (NDP) 6146
- Ray Turmel (Ind [SCO]) 259

Ottawa West:

- (incumbent) Reuben Baetz (PC) 17418
- George Anderson (L) 9112
- Lofty MacMillan (NDP) 2348
- Dale E. Alkerton (Ind [SCO]) 494

Oxford:

- Dick Treleaven (PC) 15948
- John Finlay (L) 11866
- Wayne Colbran (NDP) 3673
- Kaye Sargent (Lbt) 493

Parkdale:

- Tony Ruprecht (L) 6941
- (incumbent) Jan Dukszta (NDP) 6020
- Verrol Whitmore (PC) 2914
- Bill McGinnis (Ind) 289
- Anna Larsen (Comm) 259

Parry Sound:

- Ernie Eves (PC) 8955
- Richard Thomas (L) 8949
- Arthur Davis (NDP) 1448

Perth:

- (incumbent) Hugh Edighoffer (L) 16283
- Colleen Misener (PC) 7883
- Scott Wilson (NDP) 1881

Peterborough:

- (incumbent) John Turner (PC) 17962
- Peter Adams (L) 11263
- Paul Rexe (NDP) 8756
- John Hayes (Lbt) 787
- Bruce Knapp (Ind) 286
- Kenneth T. Burgess (Ind) 59

Port Arthur:

- (incumbent) Jim Foulds (NDP) 12258
- Allan Laakkonen (PC) 10844
- Kenneth R. Tilson (L) 3247
- Dennis Deveau (Ind) 140
- Paul Pugh (Comm) 103

Prescott and Russell:

- Don Boudria (L) 15123
- (incumbent) Joseph Albert Bélanger (PC) 9951
- Claude Dion (NDP) 1828

Prince Edward—Lennox:

- (incumbent) James Taylor (PC) 11135
- Dan Brady (L) 6797
- Bob King (NDP) 1423

Quinte:

- (incumbent) Hugh O’Neil (L) 14861
- George Mills (PC) 9517
- Reg Pearson (NDP) 1795

Rainy River:

- (incumbent) T. Patrick Reid (Liberal-Labour) 4575
- Jack Pierce (PC) 4149
- Alan M. Tibbetts (NDP) 2438

Renfrew North:

- (incumbent) Sean Conway (L) 9113
- Bryan D. Hocking (PC) 7137
- Phil Chester (NDP) 1086

Renfrew South:

- (incumbent) Paul Yakabuski (PC) 14552
- Dick Trainor (L) 10420
- Lynne Pattinson (NDP) 1174

Riverdale:

- (incumbent) Jim Renwick (NDP) 6770
- Peter Hesky (PC) 4088
- Ed Schofield (L) 3237
- Thelma R. Forsyth (Ind) 233
- Anna Sideris (Comm) 158

St. Andrew—St. Patrick:

- (incumbent) Larry Grossman (PC) 10674
- Anne Johnston (L) 6839
- Stanley E. Kutz (NDP) 3709
- Judy Darcy (Ind [Workers Communist Party]) 262
- Jeanne McGuire (Comm) 148
- Sophia M. Firth (Ind) 106

St. Catharines:

Party	Candidate	Votes	%	+/-
Liberal	(incumbent) Jim Bradley	16,509	51.85	
Progressive Conservative	John Larocque	10,273	32.26	
New Democratic	Don Loucks	4,927	15.47	
Communist	Norman J. Newell	132	0.41	
Total valid votes		31,841	100.00	
Rejected, unmarked and declined ballots		181		
Turnout		32,022	57.20	

St. David:

- (incumbent) Margaret Scrivener (PC) 9627
- Ian Scott (L) 8605
- Tyrone Turner (NDP) 5985
- Rhino Mappin (Ind [Rhinoceros]) 243

St. George:

- Susan Fish (PC) 12390
- Bruce McLeod (L) 8139
- Dan Leckie (NDP) 4999
- George Hislop (Ind) 2677
- Bruce Evoy (Lbt) 359
- Rhino Mills (Ind [Rhinoceros]) 194
- Gary Weagle (Ind) 57

Sarnia:

- Andy Brandt (PC) 13871
- (incumbent) Paul Blundy (L) 10842
- Stu Sullivan (NDP) 5292

Sault Ste. Marie:

- (incumbent) Russ Ramsay (PC) 14712
- Albert Ferranti (L) 7555
- Susan Brothers (NDP) 7162

Scarborough Centre:

- (incumbent) Frank Drea (PC) 12793
- Paul Rook (NDP) 4898
- Kurt Christensen (L) 4657
- D’Arcy Cain (Lbt) 531

Scarborough East:

- (incumbent) Margaret Birch (PC) 16386
- Charles Beer (L) 7301
- Gordon Wilson (NDP) 4826
- Jim McIntosh (Lbt) 562
- Jeff Nelles (Ind [Rhinoceros]) 171

Scarborough—Ellesmere:

- Alan Robinson (PC) 11608
- (incumbent) David Warner (NDP) 9720
- Joe Gideon (L) 4545

Scarborough North:

- (incumbent) Thomas Leonard Wells (PC) 29961
- Vera Jean Brookes (L) 12663
- Jerry Daca (NDP) 6512

Scarborough West:

- (incumbent) Richard Johnston (NDP) 10019
- John Adams (PC) 9644
- Barbara Fava (L) 3914
- Kevin James (Ind [Rhinoceros]) 369

Simcoe Centre:

- (incumbent) George Taylor (PC) 16926
- Bruce Owen (L) 12505
- Gaye Lamb (NDP) 4532

Simcoe East:

- Al McLean (PC) 12487
- Fayne Bullen (NDP) 9085
- Jack Harber (L) 7320
- Ted Wolda (Ind) 749

Stormont—Dundas and Glengarry:

- (incumbent) Osie Villeneuve (PC) 12487
- Gerry Rosenquist (L) 7846
- Joe O’Neil (NDP) 1836

Sudbury:

- Jim Gordon (PC) 12043
- (incumbent) Bud Germa (NDP) 8052
- Jim Marchbank (L) 5998
- Richard Orlandini (Comm) 115

Sudbury East:

- (incumbent) Elie Martel (NDP) 13883
- George McDonald (PC) 9420
- Esther Davidson (L) 4909

Timiskaming:

- (incumbent) Ed Havrot (PC) 8377
- Bob Bain (NDP) 6768
- Leo St. Cyr (L) 3593

Victoria—Haliburton:

- (incumbent) John Eakins (L) 12807
- Dave Murray (PC) 10509
- Art Field (NDP) 2449

Waterloo North:

- (incumbent) Herbert Epp (L) 12843
- Bob Labbett (PC) 9606
- Bob Needham (NDP) 3672

Welland—Thorold:

- (incumbent) Mel Swart (NDP) 13379
- Al Lacavera (L) 7916
- Ivy Riddell (PC) 5564

Wellington—Dufferin—Peel:

- (incumbent) Jack Johnson (PC) 16644
- Elbert van Donkersgoed (L) 8136
- Marion Chambers (NDP) 4650

Wellington South:

- (incumbent) Harry Worton (L) 16237
- Peter Mercer (PC) 7917
- Terry Crowley (NDP) 5934
- Lynne Hulley (Comm) 224

Wentworth:

- Gordon Dean (PC) 10024
- (incumbent) Colin Isaacs (NDP) 9864
- Frank Herman (L) 8847

Wentworth North:

- (incumbent) Eric Cunningham (L) 16433
- Ann Sloat (PC) 12213
- Jody Orr (NDP) 4702

Wilson Heights:

- (incumbent) David Rotenberg (PC) 11722
- Elinor Caplan (L) 8797
- Greg Ioannou (NDP) 3623

Windsor—Riverside:

- (incumbent) Dave Cooke (NDP) 13626
- Gerry Levesque (L) 9102
- Sandy Thomson (PC) 4418
- John H. Snyder (Ind) 333

Windsor—Sandwich:

- Bill Wrye (L) 7449
- (incumbent) Ted Bounsall (NDP) 7315
- Tony Brechkow (PC) 3479
- Mike Longmoore (Comm) 258

Windsor—Walkerville:

- (incumbent) Bernard Newman (L) 10553
- Ray Simpson (NDP) 4988
- Tom Porter (PC) 3428
- Gerard O’Neil (Comm) 238

York Centre:

- Don Cousens (PC) 19094
- (incumbent) Alf Stong (L) 17372
- John Campey (NDP) 3701

York East:

- (incumbent) Robert Elgie (PC) 14562
- Lois Cox (NDP) 4935
- Don McNeill (L) 4811
- Ed McDonald (Comm) 628
- E. Scott Hughes (Unparty) 460

York Mills:

- (incumbent) Bette Stephenson (PC) 20613
- Isadore Weinberg (L) 5667
- Dave Crisp (NDP) 3858
- Scott Bell (Lbt) 1287

York North:

- (incumbent) Bill Hodgson (PC) 18405
- Jim Wilson (L) 10216
- Keith Munro (NDP) 4614

York South:

- (incumbent) Donald C. MacDonald (NDP) 9518
- Les Green (L) 8099
- Barbara Jafelice (PC) 7628
- Mike Phillips (Comm) 472

Yorkview:

- Michael Spensieri (L) 10160
- Mike Morrone (NDP) 8973
- Biran Yandell (PC) 5329
- Frank Esposito (Ind) 798
- Jack Sweet (Comm) 503
- Richard A. Brandenburg (Ind) 352
- Victor Heyn (Ind) 193

York West:

- (incumbent) Nick Leluk (PC) 18501
- Michael Eagen (L) 10228
- Pauline Durning (NDP) 2865
- Don Douloff (Ind [Rhinoceros]) 538

== Post-election changes ==
Hamilton West: Stuart Smith resigned his legislative seat on January 25, 1982, and a by-election was called for June 17, 1982.

- Richard Allen (NDP) 8915
- Bob McMurrich (PC) 7066
- Joe Barbera (L) 6952
- John Turmel 174

York South: Donald C. MacDonald resigned his legislative seat in 1982, and a by-election was called for November 4, 1982.

- Bob Rae (NDP) 11212
- John Nunziata (L) 8595
- Barbara Jafelice (PC) 4376
- Myron Petriw (Lbt) 234
- John Turmel 66

Stormont—Dundas and Glengarry: Osie Villeneuve died in 1983, and a by-election has called on December 15, 1983:

- Noble Villeneuve (PC) 12197
- Johnny Whitteker (L) 8062
- Rudi Derstroff (NDP) 627
- John Turmel 97

Frontenac—Addington: Liberal MPP J. Earl McEwen crossed the floor to join the Progressive Conservatives in 1984.

Hamilton Centre: Sheila Copps resigned her legislative seat in 1984, and a by-election was held on December 13, 1984:

- Mike Davison (NDP) 5308
- Lily Oddie Munro (L) 5253
- Sandi Bell (PC) 3314
- Kerry Wilson (Comm) 124

Ottawa Centre: Michael Cassidy resigned his legislative seat in 1984, and a by-election was held on December 13, 1984.

- Evelyn Gigantes (NDP) 8165
- Graham Bird (PC) 5870
- Lowell Green (L) 5202
- Greg Vezina (G) 130
- Ray Joseph Cormier 94
- John Turmel 90

Ottawa East: Albert J. Roy resigned his legislative seat in 1984, and a by-election was held on December 13, 1984:

- Bernard Grandmaître (L) 7754
- Richard Boudreau (PC) 1934
- Jean Gilbert (NDP) 1531
- Serge Girard 122

Prescott and Russell: Don Boudria resigned his legislative seat in 1984, and a by-election was held on December 13, 1984:

- Jean Poirier (L) 10182
- Gaston Patenaude (PC) 8347
- Rheo Lalonde (NDP) 1791

Wentworth North: Eric Cunningham resigned his legislative seat in 1984, and a by-election was held on December 13, 1984:

- Ann Sloat (PC) 8524
- Chris Ward (L) 8355
- Lynn Spencer (NDP) 3115
- George Graham (Lbt) 162

Riverdale: Jim Renwick died in 1984.

Kitchener: Jim Breithaupt resigned in 1984.

Rainy River: T. Patrick Reid resigned in 1984.

Eglinton: Roy McMurtry resigned his seat in 1985 to take a government position in the United Kingdom.

== See also ==
- Politics of Ontario
- List of Ontario political parties
- Premier of Ontario
- Leader of the Opposition (Ontario)
