= Joseph Lees Easton =

Canadian politician from Ontario

Member of the Ontario Provincial Parliament for Wentworth
- In office June 7, 1948 – October 6, 1951
- Preceded by: William Robertson
- Succeeded by: Art Child

Personal details
- Party: Co-operative Commonwealth

Joseph Lees Easton was a Canadian politician who was Co-operative Commonwealth MPP for Wentworth from 1948 to 1951.

== See also ==
- 23rd Parliament of Ontario
