= Gordon Howlett Dean =

Canadian politician

Gordon Dean

Ontario MPP
- In office 1981–1987
- Preceded by: Colin Isaacs
- Succeeded by: Riding abolished
- Constituency: Wentworth

Personal details
- Born: July 23, 1922 Fruitland, Ontario
- Died: April 19, 2008 (aged 85) London, Ontario
- Party: Progressive Conservative
- Spouse: Mary
- Children: 3
- Profession: Farmer

Gordon Howlett Dean (July 23, 1922 – April 19, 2008) was a politician in Ontario, Canada. He was a Progressive Conservative member in the Legislative Assembly of Ontario from 1981 to 1987 and was a cabinet minister in the governments of Bill Davis and Frank Miller.

== Background ==
Dean was born in Fruitland, Ontario and educated at McMaster University in Hamilton where he received his Masters of Science degree. He worked as a fruit farmer, but he worked, for a short period of time, in Chalk River at the AECL facility. Married for 58 years, he and his wife, Mary, had three daughters.

== Politics ==
He was reeve and deputy reeve of Saltfleet from 1965 to 1973, a warden in Wentworth County in 1972, and mayor of Stoney Creek from 1974 to 1980. Dean served as president of the Association of Municipalities of Ontario in 1977-78.

He ran for the provincial legislature in a by-election for the riding of Wentworth held on April 5, 1979. He lost to New Democratic Party candidate Colin Isaacs by 543 votes. Two years later, he defeated Isaacs by 260 votes in the 1981 provincial election. Dean was named a minister without portfolio in Davis's government on July 6, 1983. He was appointed Provincial Secretary for Social Development on December 23 of the same year. He supported Dennis Timbrell to succeed Davis in the Progressive Conservative Party's 1985 leadership convention, and was retained in his portfolio when Frank Miller replaced Davis as Premier of Ontario on February 8, 1985.

Dean was re-elected by an increased margin in the 1985 provincial election, which saw the Progressive Conservatives reduced to a fragile minority government. He was appointed Minister of Revenue on May 17, 1985, but accomplished little in this position before Miller's government was defeated in the house the following month. In opposition, Dean served as his party's critic for Revenue and Senior Citizen's Affairs. He did not run for re-election in 1987.

=== Cabinet ===
Miller ministry, Province of Ontario (1985)
Cabinet post (1)
Predecessor	Office	Successor
Bud Gregory	Minister of Revenue; 1985 (May–June)	Robert Nixon
Davis ministry, Province of Ontario (1971–1985)
Cabinet posts (2)
Predecessor	Office	Successor
Bruce McCaffrey	Provincial Secretary for Social Development; 1983–1985	Larry Grossman
Sub-Cabinet Post
Predecessor	Title	Successor
	Minister without portfolio (1983 July–December)	

== Later life ==
He served on the Board of Directors of St. Joseph's Healthcare and the Royal Botanical Gardens in Hamilton, Ontario. He remained an active member of the Progressive Conservative Party, the McMaster Alumni Association, and the United Church of Canada until his death.
