= Donald Ewen =

Canadian politician

Don Ewen

Ontario MPP
- In office 1971–1975
- Preceded by: Ray Connell
- Succeeded by: Eric Cunningham
- Constituency: Wentworth North
- In office 1963–1967
- Preceded by: Raymond Clare Edwards
- Succeeded by: Ian Deans
- Constituency: Wentworth

Personal details
- Born: January 25, 1922 Hamilton, Ontario
- Died: March 31, 2005 (aged 83) Hamilton, Ontario
- Party: Progressive Conservative

Donald William Ewen (January 25, 1922 – March 31, 2005) was a politician in Ontario, Canada. He was a Progressive Conservative member in the Legislative Assembly of Ontario from 1963 until 1967 in the riding of Wentworth and then from 1971 to 1975 in the riding of Wentworth North.

== Background ==
Ewen was born in Hamilton, Ontario to Donald William Ewen (1897 - 1947) and Ida Brotherton (1901 - 2000). Ewen was an active Mason, having been initiated in the Seymour Lodge #272, Ancaster, Ontario, in 1949 and rising to the rank of Grand Worshipful Master, of that Lodge, in 1961. In 1975, he was the Grand Junior Deacon of the Grand Lodge of Canada. Ewen served as a public school board trustee in Ancaster, Ontario.

== Politics ==
He was elected in the general election in 1963. He served as a backbench supporter of the John Robarts government. In 1967 he was defeated by New Democrat challenger Ian Deans by about 2,000 votes. He was re-elected, in the adjacent riding of Wentworth North in 1971. He was defeated in the 1975 general election and retired from political life.

Ewen died in Hamilton, Ontario in 2005.
