= Doug Rollins =

Canadian politician

Ontario MPP
- In office 1995–1999
- Preceded by: Hugh O'Neil
- Succeeded by: Riding abolished
- Constituency: Quinte

Personal details
- Born: November 7, 1938
- Died: November 19, 2012 (aged 74); Belleville, Ontario, Canada
- Political party: Progressive Conservative
- Spouse: Cheryl Rollins
- Relations: Clarke Rollins (cousin)
- Children: 2
- Profession: Business owner

E.J. Douglas Rollins (November 7, 1938 – November 19, 2012) was a politician in Ontario, Canada. He was a Progressive Conservative member of the Legislative Assembly of Ontario who represented the riding of Quinte from 1995 to 1999.

== Background ==
Rollins was active in many community organizations and served as President of the Belleville Agricultural Society and the Quinte Exhibition and Raceway. For many years he owned and operated a gas station in the east end of Belleville. His cousin, Clarke Rollins, was the MPP for neighbouring riding Hastings—Peterborough from 1955 to 1981.

== Politics ==
In the 1995 provincial election, he was elected as a Progressive Conservative in riding of Quinte, defeating Liberal George Zegouras by 2,103 votes. Rollins served as a backbench supporter of the Mike Harris government for the next four years.

The Harris government reduced the number of provincial constituencies from 130 to 103 in 1996, and many sitting MPPs were forced to run against each other. Rollins ran for the Progressive Conservative nomination in the new riding of Prince Edward—Hastings, but lost to Gary Fox. Fox was defeated in the June 3, 1999 election.

== Later life ==
In 2003, Rollins was appointed to the Ontario Parole Board which was seen as a patronage appointment. He died from leukemia on November 19, 2012.

His political papers are held at the Community Archives of Belleville and Hastings County.
