= Raymond Clare Edwards =

Canadian politician

Ontario MPP
- In office 1959–1963
- Preceded by: Arthur John Child
- Succeeded by: Donald Ewen
- Constituency: Wentworth

Personal details
- Born: August 2, 1920 Meyronne, Saskatchewan
- Died: February 6, 2017 (aged 96) Hamilton, Ontario
- Party: Liberal
- Spouse: Rita Miles (m. 1941)
- Children: 5
- Occupation: Realtor, insurance agent

Raymond Clare Edwards (August 2, 1920 – February 6, 2017) was a politician in Ontario, Canada. He served as a Liberal member of the Legislative Assembly of Ontario from 1959 to 1963 representing the Hamilton area riding of Wentworth.

== Background ==
Edwards was born in Meyronne, Saskatchewan, a rural part of the southern province. His parents were Charles Raymond Edwards and Caroline Matilda Stribbell. He was a realtor and insurance agent. In 1941, he married Rita Miles and together they raised five children.

== Politics ==
Edwards sat on Hamilton City Council from 1959 to 1960, representing Ward 8.

In the 1959 provincial election, Edwards ran as the Liberal candidate in the Hamilton area riding of Wentworth. He defeated Progressive Conservative incumbent Art Child by 945 votes. He served as a supporter of opposition party leader John Wintermeyer for the next four years. In the 1963 election, he was defeated by PC candidate Donald Ewen by 943 votes.
