= George Henry Bethune =

Canadian politician

Ontario MPP
- In office 1934–1943
- Preceded by: New riding
- Succeeded by: William Robertson
- Constituency: Wentworth

Personal details
- Born: September 19, 1878 Glanford township
- Died: August 11, 1965 (aged 86) Hamilton, Ontario
- Party: Liberal
- Spouse: Annie May Marshall (m. 1911)
- Children: 5
- Occupation: Farmer

George Henry Bethune (September 19, 1878 – August 11, 1965) was a farmer and political figure in Ontario. He represented Wentworth in the Legislative Assembly of Ontario from 1934 to 1943 as a Liberal member.

He was born in Glanford township, the son of William F. Bethune and Helen Storar, both of Scottish origin, and was educated there. In 1911, Bethune married Annie M. Marshall. He served as reeve for Glanford. He died in Hamilton, Ontario in 1965.
