= William Robertson (Ontario) =

Ontario labourer and politician

Ontario MPP
- In office 1943–1948
- Preceded by: George Henry Bethune
- Succeeded by: Joseph Lees Easton
- Constituency: Wentworth

Personal details
- Born: January 2, 1897 Bothwellhaugh, Scotland
- Died: April 15, 1948 (aged 51) Toronto, Ontario
- Party: CCF
- Occupation: Labourer

William Robertson (January 2, 1897 – April 15, 1948) was an Ontario labourer and political figure. He represented Wentworth in the Legislative Assembly of Ontario from 1943 to 1948 as a Co-operative Commonwealth member.

He was born in Bothwellhaugh, Scotland, the son of William Robertson, was educated there and came to Canada in 1926. He died when he was hit by a motorist right across the street from the Ontario legislative assembly in Toronto and buried in Hamilton Ontario.
