= Richard Potter (Canadian politician) =

Canadian politician and physician

Richard Thomas Potter
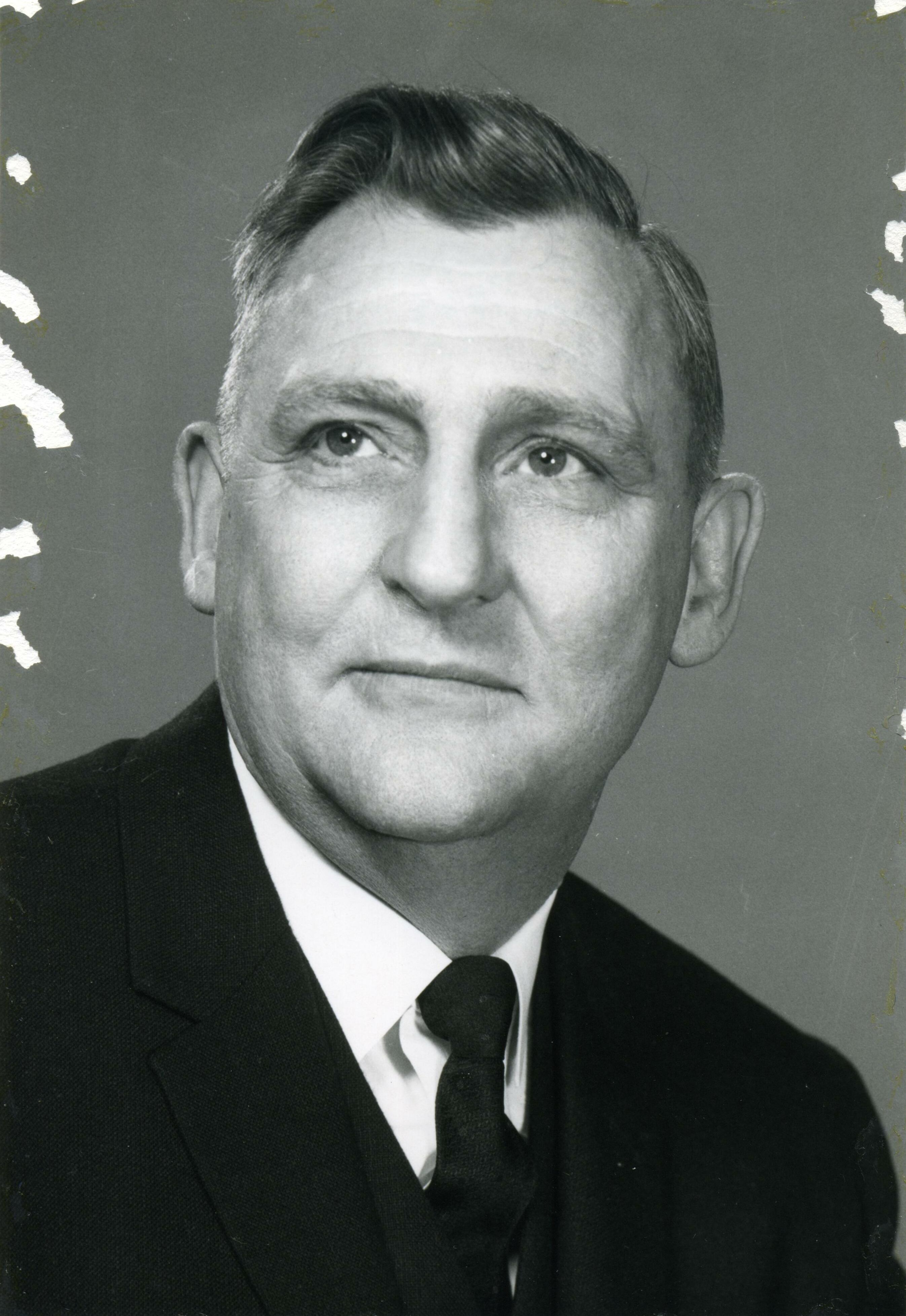
- Potter in 1965

Ontario MPP
- In office 1967–1975
- Preceded by: New riding
- Succeeded by: Hugh O'Neil
- Constituency: Quinte

Personal details
- Born: January 20, 1915 Belleville, Ontario, Canada
- Died: February 16, 2009 (aged 94) Oakville, Ontario, Canada
- Party: Progressive Conservative
- Spouse: Enid Grace Weaver
- Children: Thomas, Frances, Andrew, Karen
- Profession: Physician
- Portfolio: Minister without portfolio (1971–1972)

Military service
- Allegiance: Canada
- Branch/service: Royal Canadian Army Medical Corps
- Years of service: 1939–1945
- Rank: Lieutenant Colonel

Richard Thomas Potter (January 20, 1915 – February 16, 2009) was a Canadian physician and politician in Ontario. He served as a Progressive Conservative member of the Legislative Assembly of Ontario from 1967 to 1975, representing the eastern Ontario riding of Quinte.

== Background ==
Potter received his early education locally before attending Queen's University in Kingston, Ontario. In 1939, he graduated as a physician. Immediately after graduation, he enlisted in the Royal Canadian Army Medical Corps, serving as a military medic during World War II. Using his medical expertise, he provided care to soldiers injured in battles across Europe.

He was part of an advanced mobile medical unit, responsible for treating soldiers close to the front lines. By the end of his military service, he had attained the rank of lieutenant colonel.

Following his discharge, Potter returned to his hometown of Belleville, Ontario, where he established himself as a family doctor and anesthetist. He married Enid Grace Weaver, with whom he had four children: Thomas, Frances, Andrew, and Karen.

== Politics ==
In 1950, Potter began his political career when he was elected as an Alderman in Belleville, Ontario. The following year, he successfully ran for Mayor, campaigning on promises to establish a municipal health unit and expand community facilities.

In the 1967 provincial election, Potter ran as the Progressive Conservative candidate for the Quinte riding. He defeated Ronald Joss of the Liberal Party by a margin of 4,092 votes.

Potter was re-elected in the 1971 provincial election. Following the election, Premier Bill Davis appointed Potter as a Minister without portfolio.

In February 1972, Potter was promoted to Minister of Health. Two years later, in 1974, he was reassigned to serve as the Minister of Correctional Services.

=== Cabinet positions ===
Davis ministry, Province of Ontario (1971–1985)
Cabinet posts (2)
Predecessor	Office	Successor
Syl Apps	Minister of Correctional Services; 1974-1975	John Smith
Bert Lawrence	Minister of Health; 1972-1974	Frank Miller

== Later life ==
Potter retired from politics in 1975 at the age of 60, following a career marked by significant contributions to health and welfare reforms during his tenure as a cabinet minister. In 1976, he was appointed as the regional coroner, a role that required him to close his private medical practice and dedicate himself fully to public service.

Later in life, Potter and his wife moved to a nursing home in Oakville, Ontario to be closer to their grandchildren. He died there on February 16, 2009, at the age of 94.
