= Art Child =

Canadian politician (1915–1996)

Arthur Child

Member of Provincial Parliament for Wentworth
- In office November 22, 1951 – June 11, 1959
- Preceded by: Joseph Lees Easton
- Succeeded by: Raymond Clare Edwards

Personal details
- Born: September 15, 1915 London, England
- Died: June 30, 1996 (aged 80) Dundas, Ontario, Canada
- Party: Progressive Conservative
- Spouse: Olga Hubert
- Children: 1
- Occupation: Hockey player
Ice hockey career
- Position: Goaltender
- Played for: Wembley Lions; Earls Court Rangers; Wembley Monarchs
- National team: Great Britain
- Playing career: 1935–1940

Arthur John Child (September 15, 1915 – June 30, 1996) was a British-born Canadian politician and former amateur ice hockey goaltender. He played ice hockey for three British teams from 1935 to 1940. He served as a Progressive Conservative member of the Legislative Assembly of Ontario from 1951 to 1959 representing the Hamilton area riding of Wentworth.

== Background ==
Child was born at London, England in 1915, the son of Alfred Child. He moved to Canada in 1919 and was educated in Hamilton, Ontario, but returned to England to play hockey in 1935. He was the backup goaltender for the GB national ice hockey team which won gold at the 1936 Winter Olympics (see Ice hockey at the 1936 Winter Olympics). Child himself did not take to the ice during the tournament and was not awarded a gold medal. He also played for the Wembley Lions. He is a member of the British Ice Hockey Hall of Fame. Child later returned to Canada and worked as a supervisor for the American Can Company. He was also involved in the local sports circles in Hamilton, Ontario. He married Olga Hubert in 1940 in London, England and had one son. Child died of a heart attack while playing golf at the Dundas Golf and Country Club in 1996. He was 80.

== Politics ==
In the 1951 provincial election, Child ran as the Progressive Conservative candidate in the Hamilton area riding of Wentworth. He defeated incumbent CCF member J.L. Easton by 408 votes. He served as a backbench supporter of the Leslie Frost government for the next eight years and was re-elected in 1955. In the 1959 election, he was defeated by Liberal candidate Raymond Clare Edwards by 945 votes.
