= David William Warner =

Canadian politician

Ontario MPP
- In office 1990–1995
- Preceded by: Frank Faubert
- Succeeded by: Marilyn Mushinski
- Constituency: Scarborough—Ellesmere
- In office 1985–1987
- Preceded by: Alan Robinson
- Succeeded by: Frank Faubert
- Constituency: Scarborough—Ellesmere
- In office 1975–1981
- Preceded by: Riding established
- Succeeded by: Alan Robinson
- Constituency: Scarborough—Ellesmere

Personal details
- Born: Toronto, Ontario, Canada
- Party: New Democratic Party
- Occupation: Teacher

David William Warner is a former politician in Ontario, Canada. He was a New Democratic Party member of the Legislative Assembly of Ontario on three occasions (spanning four terms) between 1975 and 1995, and served as Speaker of the Assembly during Bob Rae's administration.

== Background ==
Warner worked as a teacher and served as chair of Elementary Public Schools in Scarborough. His daughter Barbara Warner ran for the Ontario NDP in the 2003 provincial election, in the riding of Scarborough Southwest. She contested nominations within the Ontario NDP, in the riding of Toronto-Danforth, and within the federal NDP, in her home riding of Beaches-East York. His daughter Sherri Warner has not run for office. Both Barbara and Sherri served as legislative pages in the Ontario Legislature in 1985 and 1986 respectively.

== Politics ==
Warner ran for the House of Commons of Canada as a candidate of the federal New Democratic Party in the elections of the 1972 and 1974, but finished a distant third in the riding of York—Scarborough on both occasions.

In 1975, he was elected to the Ontario legislature in the 1975 provincial election, defeating Progressive Conservative candidate, Brian Harrison, by fewer than 1,000 votes in the riding of Scarborough—Ellesmere. He was re-elected by roughly the same margin in the 1977 provincial election. The Progressive Conservatives under Bill Davis held a minority government throughout this period, and Warner served as a member of the opposition. He was defeated by Progressive Conservative candidate Alan Robinson in the 1981 election, when the Davis government won a majority victory.

Warner was re-elected in the 1985 provincial election, defeating Robinson by 219 votes as the Tories were reduced to a precarious minority government under the new leadership of Frank Miller. The Liberals under David Peterson were able to form a minority government with outside support from the NDP, and Warner served as his party's critic for Education and Skills Development over the next two years. He was again defeated in the 1987 provincial election, losing to Liberal Frank Faubert by 481 votes.

The NDP won a majority government in the 1990 provincial election, as Warner defeated Faubert by about 4,500 votes in a rematch from 1987.

On November 19, 1990, the house chose their Speaker using a secret ballot system. Previously, the Speaker had been appointed by the government. Warner won the ballot over other candidates including Liberal Jean Poirier and PC Norm Sterling. He held this position throughout the Rae government's mandate. His tenure in this office was generally free of controversy, unlike the tenures of his Progressive Conservative successors.

The NDP were defeated in the 1995 provincial election, and Warner lost his seat to Progressive Conservative Marilyn Mushinski by over 5,000 votes.

== After politics ==
Warner is now editor of the magazine of the Ontario Former Parliamentarians Association, and sits on the Association's governing body. In 2018, Warner compiled and edited a special edition of the OFPA's magazine about the artists of Queen's Park. He previously served as board member of the United Nations Association of Canada, president of the Canadian Cuban Friendship Association in Toronto, chair of non profit counselling agency InCharge Debt Solutions, and board member of Credit Canada Debt Solutions.

He and his wife Pat are both retired. They enjoy travelling with their three grandchildren Sebastian, Logan, and Jillian.
