= Alan Robinson (Canadian politician) =

Canadian politician

Ontario MPP
- In office 1981–1985
- Preceded by: David Warner
- Succeeded by: David Warner
- Constituency: Scarborough—Ellesmere

Personal details
- Born: October 21, 1948 Toronto, Ontario, Canada
- Died: December 6, 2013 (aged 65) Toronto, Ontario, Canada
- Party: Progressive Conservative
- Occupation: Journalist
- Portfolio: Minister without portfolio Chief Government Whip (February–May 1985)

Alan M. Robinson (October 21, 1948 – December 6, 2013) was a politician in Ontario, Canada. He served in the Legislative Assembly of Ontario from 1981 to 1985, and was a cabinet minister in the government of Frank Miller. Robinson was a member of the Progressive Conservative Party.

== Background ==
Robinson was born in Toronto, Ontario, and educated at Ryerson Polytechnical Institute. He worked as a broadcaster and newspaperman.

== Politics ==
He was an alderman in Scarborough from 1978 to 1981.

He was elected to the Ontario legislature in the 1981 election, defeating New Democratic Party incumbent David Warner by 1,888 votes in Scarborough—Ellesmere. He served as a backbench supporter of Bill Davis's government for four years. Robinson supported Dennis Timbrell's unsuccessful bid to succeed Davis at the Progressive Conservative Party's January 1985 leadership convention, and was named a minister without portfolio and Chief Government Whip when Frank Miller became Premier of Ontario on February 8, 1985.

The Progressive Conservatives under Miller's leadership were reduced to a minority government in the 1985 election. Robinson lost to David Warner in Scarborough—Ellesmere by 1,119 votes.

== Later life ==
After leaving politics, Robinson became the president and CEO of PACex International, which describes itself as "Canada's National Packaging, Food Process, Material Handling & Logistics Exhibition". He retired in 2006. PACex purchased the Canadian Materials Handling & Logistics Show in 2003.

Robinson died after a long illness, on December 6, 2013.
