= Hugh O'Neil =

Canadian politician (1936–2015)

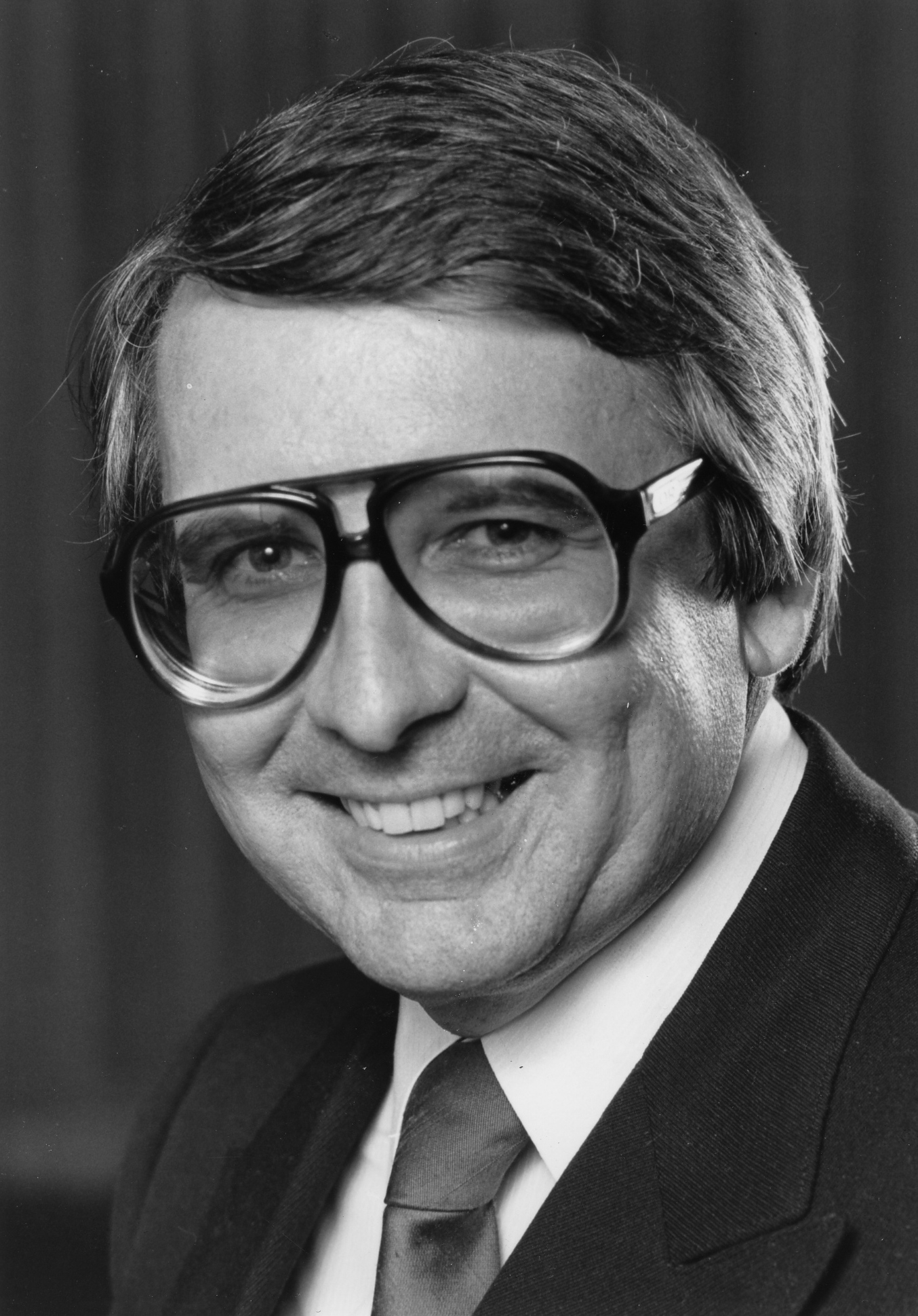
- O'Neil circa 1980

Ontario MPP
- In office 1975–1995
- Preceded by: Richard Potter
- Succeeded by: Doug Rollins
- Constituency: Quinte

Personal details
- Born: Hugh Patrick O'Neil; July 10, 1936; Belleville, Ontario
- Died: September 14, 2015 (aged 79); Trenton, Ontario
- Political party: Liberal
- Spouse: Donna McColl
- Children: 2

Hugh Patrick O'Neil (July 10, 1936 – September 14, 2015) was a politician in Ontario, Canada. He was a Liberal member of the Legislative Assembly of Ontario from 1975 to 1995, and served as a cabinet minister in the government of David Peterson.

== Background ==
O'Neil was educated at Peterborough Teachers' College (c. 1907 as Peterborough Normal School), and worked as a teacher and real estate broker before entering political life. He was married to Donna Grace (McColl) and they raised two children, David and Catherine.

== Politics ==
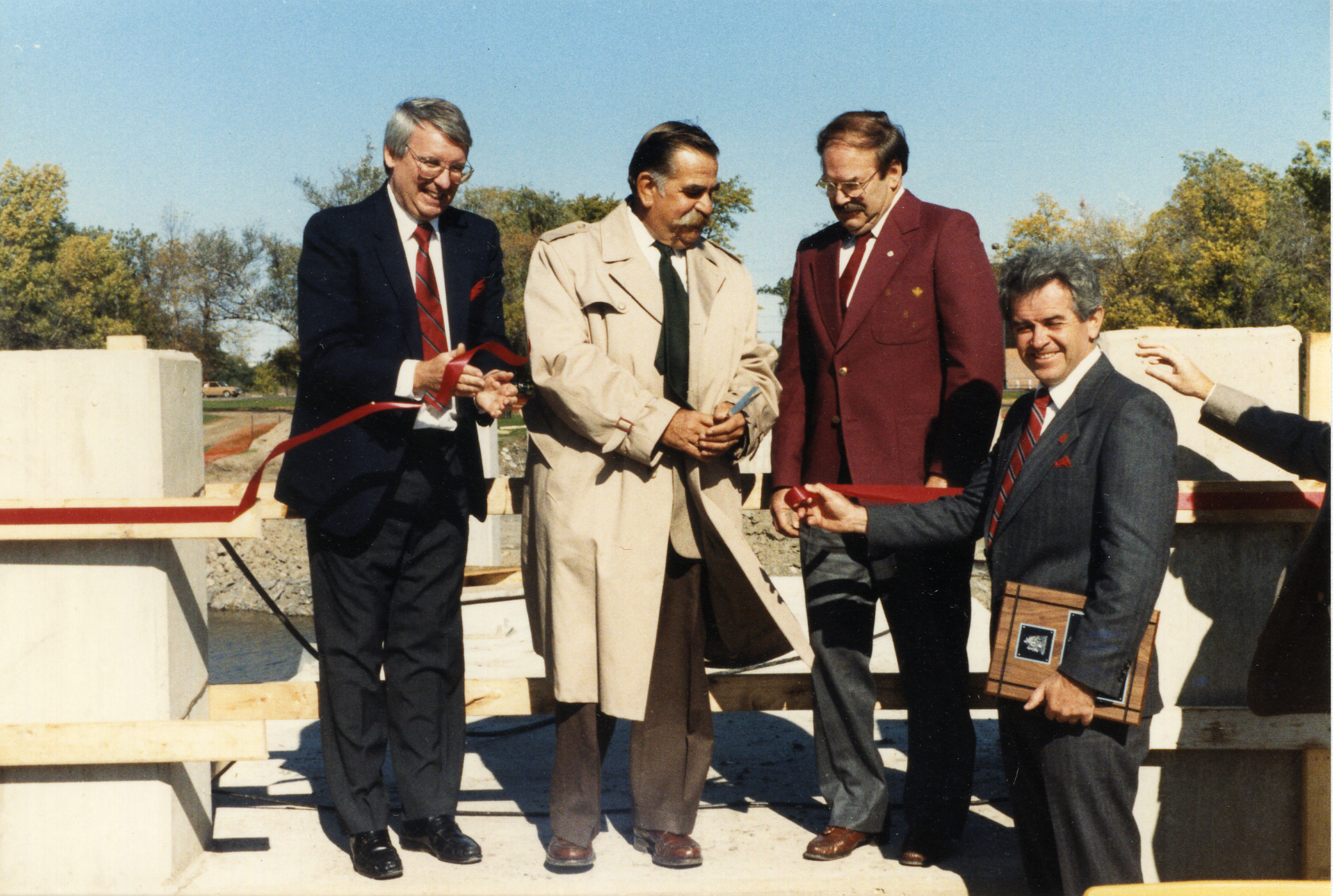
Hugh O'Neil (left) as Tourism Minister in Belleville, 1987

He was elected to the Ontario legislature in the 1975 provincial election, defeating the Progressive Conservative candidate by 659 votes in the eastern Ontario riding of Quinte. He was re-elected by a much greater margin in the 1977 provincial election, and in the elections of 1981, 1985, 1987, and 1990.

The Liberals under David Peterson formed a minority government following the 1985 election, and O'Neil was appointed as Minister of Industry, Trade and Technology on June 26, 1985.

In 1987, O'Neil was named Minister of Tourism and Recreation. Following a cabinet shuffle, he was named as Minister of Mines on August 2, 1989. He also became Minister of Culture and Communications on June 5, 1990. In addition, O'Neil served as Peterson's regional minister for eastern Ontario.

The Liberals were defeated by the New Democratic Party in the 1990 provincial election. O'Neil was re-elected and served as his party's critic for Tourism and Recreation for the entirety of the next parliament, and did not run for re-election in 1995, choosing instead to retire from politics and return to a business career in real estate.

=== Cabinet positions ===
Ontario provincial government of David Peterson
Cabinet posts (4)
Predecessor	Office	Successor
Christine Hart	Minister of Culture and Communications; 1990 (June–Sept)	Rosario Marchese
Sean Conway	Minister of Mines; 1989–1990	Gilles Pouliot
John Eakins	Minister of Tourism and Recreation; 1987–1989	Ken Black
Andy Brandt	Minister of Industry, Trade and Technology; 1985–1987	Monte Kwinter

== Later life ==
After his time in the legislature, he managed a property development company in the residential and commercial sector. He spent much of his spare time volunteering for community organizations and spent time as Honorary Colonel of the Canadian Armed Forces 424 Transport and Rescue Squadron at CFB Trenton. He was also Honorary Chair of Loyalist College Foundation Board of Directors and several other groups.

In July 2013, O'Neil and John Williams, former mayor of Quinte West, were awarded the Canadian Forces Medallion for Distinguished Service for their dedication in creating and completing the Afghanistan Repatriation Memorial at Bain Park in Quinte West adjacent to CFB Trenton, Canada's largest military base. O'Neil spearheaded the campaign beginning in 2010 to create the memorial and was a key member of the memorial committee. This award is the Canadian military's highest level of recognition for a civilian.

O'Neil died in Trenton, Ontario, on September 14, 2015, at the age of 79.

O'Neil's son, Dave, is the Liberal Party candidate in Bay of Quinte for the 2025 Ontario general election.

The O'Neil collection of papers, photos and legislative records is available for viewing at the Community Archives of Belleville and Hastings County in Belleville, Ontario.
