= Fruitland, Ontario =

Coordinates: 43.2100°N 79.7151°W

Fruitland, Ontario (Census Tract 5370085.03) (2006 Population 2,824) is a community in the eastern end of Hamilton, Ontario, Canada. Its adjacent communities includes Winona, Beamsville, and Grimsby. The region became known as Fruitland due to its fertile soil, and the region is renowned for its winery industry. At the eastern border is Glover Road and its western border is Millen Road. E. D. Smith's Jam and Condiment Factory is located just to the east of Fruitland, as well as many other industrial entities. Orchards are also in abundance, and the region attracts many migrant workers who work in the fields.

== See also ==
- Stoney Creek
- Hamilton
