= Scarborough—Ellesmere =

Former provincial electoral district in Ontario, Canada

Scarborough-Ellesmere
Ontario electoral district

Defunct provincial electoral district
- Legislature: Legislative Assembly of Ontario
- District created: 1974
- District abolished: 1996
- First contested: 1975
- Last contested: 1995

Demographics
- Census division: Toronto
- Census subdivision: Toronto

Scarborough—Ellesmere was a provincial riding in Ontario, Canada. It was created prior to the 1975 provincial election and eliminated in 1996, when its territory was incorporated into the riding of Scarborough Centre. Scarborough—Ellesmere riding was created from parts of the former ridings of Scarborough North, Scarborough West and Scarborough Centre. It was in the former borough of Scarborough.

Four Members of Provincial Parliament represented the riding during its history. The most notable was David Warner who served as Speaker of the Legislature from 1990 to 1995.

== Boundaries ==
Scarborough—Ellesmere occupied the west central part of Scarborough. From its southwest corner it went north along Victoria Park Avenue to Lawrence Avenue East. East to Birchmount Road and then north to Highway 401. It turned east and followed the 401 to Markham Road. South from this point along Markham to Ellesmere Road and then east to Scarborough Golf Club Road. It went south to Lawrence Avenue East and then turned back west along Lawrence to Midland Avenue where it jogged south to Eglinton Avenue East. It then followed Eglinton west to back to Victoria Park Avenue.

== Members of Provincial Parliament ==
Scarborough—Ellesmere
Assembly	Years	Member	Party
Created from Scarborough North, Scarborough West and Scarborough Centre in 1975
30th	1975–1977	David Warner	New Democratic
31st	1977–1981	David Warner	New Democratic
32nd	1981–1985	Alan Robinson	Progressive Conservative
33rd	1985–1987	David Warner	New Democratic
34th	1987–1990	Frank Faubert	Liberal
35th	1990–1995	David Warner	New Democratic
36th	1995–1999	Marilyn Mushinski	Progressive Conservative
Sourced from the Ontario Legislative Assembly
Merged into Scarborough Centre after 1996

== Electoral results ==
=== 1987 electoral boundaries ===
1995 Ontario general election
Party	Candidate	Votes	%	±%
Progressive Conservative	Marilyn Mushinski	13,282	47.89	+31.21
New Democratic	David William Warner	7,906	28.50	–19.70
Liberal	Kris Parthiban	5,602	20.20	–12.14
Confederation of Regions	James C. MacLeod	745	2.69	–
Natural Law	Daniéle Bélair	202	0.73	–
Total valid votes		27,737	98.73	
Total rejected, unmarked and declined ballots		356	1.27	–0.02
Turnout		28,093	64.95	–1.84
Eligible voters		43,252		
Progressive Conservative gain from New Democratic		Swing		+21.68
Source: Elections Ontario

1990 Ontario general election
Party	Candidate	Votes	%	±%
New Democratic	David William Warner	14,036	48.20	+8.14
Liberal	Frank Faubert	9,417	32.34	–9.33
Progressive Conservative	Gregory Hugh Vezina	4,855	16.67	–1.59
Libertarian	Kelvin L. Smith	811	2.79	–
Total valid votes		29,119	98.71	
Total rejected, unmarked and declined ballots		381	1.29	+0.51
Turnout		29,500	66.80	+3.20
Eligible voters		44,165		
New Democratic gain from Liberal		Swing		+8.74
Source: Elections Ontario

1987 Ontario general election
Party	Candidate	Votes	%	±%
Liberal	Frank Faubert	12,422	41.67	+16.99
New Democratic	David William Warner	11,941	40.06	+2.64
Progressive Conservative	Gail Anne Brewer	5,445	18.27	–18.34
Total valid votes		29,808	99.22	
Total rejected ballots		234	0.78	+0.21
Turnout		30,042	63.60	+0.06
Eligible voters		47,238		
Liberal gain from New Democratic		Swing		+7.18
Source: Elections Ontario

=== 1975 electoral boundaries ===
1985 Ontario general election
Party	Candidate	Votes	%	±%
New Democratic	David William Warner	10,119	37.42	–0.15
Progressive Conservative	Alan Robinson	9,900	36.61	–8.25
Liberal	Carole Lidgold	6,674	24.68	+7.11
Libertarian	George J. Dance	348	1.29	–
Total valid votes		27,041	99.43	
Total rejected ballots		156	0.57	–0.01
Turnout		27,197	63.53	+3.38
Eligible voters		42,808		
New Democratic gain from Progressive Conservative		Swing		+4.05
Source: Elections Ontario

1981 Ontario general election
Party	Candidate	Votes	%	±%
Progressive Conservative	Alan Robinson	11,608	44.87	+10.26
New Democratic	David William Warner	9,720	37.57	–2.95
Liberal	Joe Gideon	4,545	17.57	–6.54
Total valid votes		25,873	99.42	
Total rejected ballots		152	0.58	+0.25
Turnout		26,025	60.15	–3.56
Eligible voters		43,264		
Progressive Conservative gain from New Democratic		Swing		+6.61
Source: Elections Ontario

1977 Ontario general election
Party	Candidate	Votes	%	±%
New Democratic	David William Warner	10,625	40.52	+1.53
Progressive Conservative	Spurge Near	9,074	34.61	+0.58
Liberal	Ken Dimson	6,320	24.10	–1.78
Libertarian	Mathias Blecker	201	0.77	–0.32
Total valid votes		26,220	99.66	
Total rejected ballots		89	0.34	–0.05
Turnout		26,309	63.72	–3.89
Eligible voters		41,290		
New Democratic hold		Swing		+0.47
Source: Elections Ontario

1975 Ontario general election
Party	Candidate	Votes	%
New Democratic	David William Warner	10,573	39.00
Progressive Conservative	Brian Harrison	9,226	34.03
Liberal	Ken Tilley	7,019	25.89
Libertarian	Scott Bell	295	1.09
Total valid votes		27,113	99.61
Total rejected ballots		107	0.39
Turnout		27,220	67.60
Eligible voters		40,264	
New Democratic pickup new district.			
Source: Elections Ontario

== See also ==
- List of Ontario provincial electoral districts
- Canadian provincial electoral districts
