= Eric Cunningham =

Canadian politician (1949–2015)

Ontario MPP
- In office 1975–1984
- Preceded by: Don Ewen
- Succeeded by: Ann Sloat
- Constituency: Wentworth North

Personal details
- Born: Eric Gordon Cunningham; April 14, 1949 Hamilton, Ontario
- Died: January 1, 2015 (aged 65) Huntsville, Ontario
- Party: Liberal
- Education: University of Western Ontario; McMaster University
- Occupation: Advertising executive

Eric Gordon Cunningham (April 14, 1949 – January 1, 2015) was a politician in Ontario, Canada. He was a Liberal member of the Legislative Assembly of Ontario from 1975 to 1984.

== Background ==
Cunningham was born in Hamilton, Ontario, and educated at the University of Western Ontario and McMaster University. He worked as an advertising executive, was a founder of the Ontario New Liberal Association, and received a provincial recognition award in 1968.

== Politics ==
He campaigned for the House of Commons of Canada in the 1974 federal election as a candidate of the Liberal Party of Canada, and lost to Progressive Conservative Bill Kempling by 668 votes in Halton—Wentworth. He was elected to the Ontario legislature in a provincial election the following year, defeating Progressive Conservative incumbent Don Ewen by 1,977 votes in Wentworth North. He was re-elected by an increased majority in the 1977 election, and defeated Progressive Conservative challenger Ann Sloat in 1981. He supported Jim Breithaupt for the Liberal Party leadership in 1982, and resigned from the legislature in 1984 to run federally a second time.

Cunningham was defeated in the 1984 federal election, losing to Progressive Conservative candidate Geoff Scott by over 10,000 votes amid Brian Mulroney's landslide victory across the country.

== Later life ==
Cunningham joined United Water Canada in 1999, as vice-president of business development responsible for Canada. In 2002, he told an interviewer that his company was investigating possibilities with several Canadian municipalities for private sector expansion in water treatment.

Cunningham also remained active in the Liberal Party. In 2004, he supported Tony Valeri over Sheila Copps for the federal party's contested nomination in Hamilton East—Stoney Creek.

Cunningham died at the age of 65 on January 1, 2015.
