= Colin Isaacs =

Canadian politician

Ontario MPP
- In office 1979–1981
- Preceded by: Ian Deans
- Succeeded by: Gordon Dean
- Constituency: Wentworth

Personal details
- Born: 1948 (age 76–77); New Malden, Surrey, England
- Political party: New Democrat
- Profession: Environmental consultant, journalist

Colin Francis Weeber Isaacs (born 3rd quarter 1948) is a former politician in Ontario, Canada. He was a New Democratic Party member in the Legislative Assembly of Ontario representing the riding of Wentworth from 1979 to 1981. He works as an environmental consultant and journalist and publishes the Gallon Newsletter.

== Early life ==
He was born in New Malden, Surrey, England and was educated at the University of London and the University of Western Ontario. Isaacs served on the town council for Stoney Creek.

== Politics ==
He ran for the provincial legislature in a by-election for the riding of Wentworth held on April 5, 1979. He won the contest defeating Progressive Conservative candidate Gordon Dean by 543 votes. Two years later, he was defeated by Dean by 160 votes in the 1981 provincial election.

== Later life ==
He was a director of the Recycling Council of Ontario and executive director for the Pollution Probe Foundation. Isaacs was environmental columnist for the Financial Post from 1990 to 1994. He publishes and edits the Gallon Environment Letter, an electronic newsletter addressing environmental issues.
