= Ann Sloat =

Canadian politician

Ontario MPP
- In office 1984–1985
- Preceded by: Eric Cunningham
- Succeeded by: Chris Ward
- Constituency: Wentworth North

Mayor of Ancaster, Ontario
- In office 1973–1984
- Preceded by: Arthur Bowes
- Succeeded by: Bob Wade

Personal details
- Born: Frances O'Rourke; July 28, 1928; Stratford, Ontario
- Died: November 21, 2017 (aged 89); Hamilton, Ontario
- Political party: Progressive Conservative
- Spouse: Donald Moore Sloat
- Children: 6
- Occupation: Nurse

Frances Sloat (née O'Rourke; July 28, 1928 – November 21, 2017) was a politician in Ontario, Canada. She was the mayor of Ancaster from 1973 to 1984, and the Progressive Conservative member of the Legislative Assembly of Ontario from 1984 to 1985. She was elected in a by-election in December 1984, but was defeated six months later in the 1985 provincial election. During her time as MPP the legislature was not in session.

== Background ==
Frances Sloat, nicknamed "Ann", was born in Stratford, Ontario, and was educated in that city and Hamilton. She graduated from Hamilton General Hospital, School of Nursing in 1951. She and her husband Donald, who died in 1978, raised six children.

== Politics ==
Sloat was a school trustee in Ancaster, and chaired the Wentworth County Board of Education from 1971 to 1972.

From 1973 to 1984, she served as the mayor of Ancaster.

Sloat campaigned for the Ontario legislature in the 1981 provincial election, and lost to Liberal incumbent Eric Cunningham by 4,121 votes in Wentworth North. Cunningham resigned his seat in 1984, and Sloat contested a by-election to succeed him in December of the same year. She was successful, defeating Liberal Chris Ward by 169 votes. She took the oath of office as a Member of Provincial Parliament in January 1985, and immediately endorsed Frank Miller to become the party's new leader at a February leadership convention.

Miller won the party leadership, and did not re-convene the legislature before calling another provincial election. This time, Ward defeated Sloat by 5,168 votes amid a provincial swing to the Liberals.

She returned to municipal politics after this loss. She served as a Hamilton-Wentworth regional councillor, and was deputy mayor of Ancaster before the city's amalgamation with Hamilton in 2000.

== Later life ==
Sloat was also a member of the Ancaster Hydro Commission for eleven years. In 2001, she was listed as a corporate officer of the Hamilton Utilities Corporation.

She died on November 21, 2017, at the age of 89. Earlier in the year, the town of Ancaster named the plaza in front of the town hall in Sloat's honour.
