= Quinte (electoral district) =

Former provincial electoral district in Ontario, Canada

Ontario electoral district

Defunct provincial electoral district
- Legislature: Legislative Assembly of Ontario
- District created: 1966
- District abolished: 1996
- First contested: 1967
- Last contested: 1995

Quinte was a provincial electoral district in Ontario, Canada. It was created in 1967 out of Hastings West and abolished in 1999, when it was redistributed into Prince Edward—Hastings and Northumberland when ridings were redistributed to match their federal counterparts. It consisted of the Belleville and Trenton areas.

== Members of Provincial Parliament ==
Quinte
Assembly	Years	Member	Party
Riding created out of Hastings West
28th	1967–1971	Richard Potter	Progressive Conservative
29th	1971–1975	Richard Potter	Progressive Conservative
30th	1975–1977	Hugh O'Neil	Liberal
31st	1977–1981	Hugh O'Neil	Liberal
32nd	1981–1985	Hugh O'Neil	Liberal
33rd	1985–1987	Hugh O'Neil	Liberal
34th	1987–1990	Hugh O'Neil	Liberal
35th	1990–1995	Hugh O'Neil	Liberal
36th	1995–1999	Doug Rollins	Progressive Conservative
Riding dissolved into Prince Edward—Hastings and Northumberland

== Election results ==
1995 Ontario general election
Party	Candidate	Votes	%	±%
Progressive Conservative	Doug Rollins	13,961	47.28	+27.66
Liberal	George Zegouras	11,826	40.05	+2.62
New Democratic	Barb Dolan	3,743	12.68	–10.93
Total valid votes		29,530	98.92	
Total rejected, unmarked and declined ballots		323	1.08	+0.09
Turnout		29,853	58.79	–0.63
Eligible voters		50,783		
Progressive Conservative gain from Liberal		Swing		+12.52
Source: Elections Ontario

1990 Ontario general election
Party	Candidate	Votes	%	±%
Liberal	Hugh O'Neil	11,114	37.43	–24.65
New Democratic	Greg Meehan	7,010	23.61	+10.87
Progressive Conservative	Doug Rollins	5,825	19.62	–4.06
Confederation of Regions	Stu Meeks	3,411	11.49	–
Family Coalition	Dave Switzer	2,331	7.85	–
Total valid votes		29,691	99.01	
Total rejected, unmarked and declined ballots		296	0.99	+0.55
Turnout		29,987	59.41	+2.24
Eligible voters		50,471		
Liberal hold		Swing		–17.76
Source: Elections Ontario

1987 Ontario general election
Party	Candidate	Votes	%	±%
Liberal	Hugh O'Neil	17,151	62.08	–1.02
Progressive Conservative	Doug Brewer	6,543	23.68	–7.18
New Democratic	Gene Morosan	3,520	12.74	+6.70
Libertarian	Allan C. Bristol	413	1.49	–
Total valid votes		27,627	99.56	
Total rejected ballots		122	0.44	+0.15
Turnout		27,749	57.17	–3.49
Eligible voters		48,536		
Liberal hold		Swing		+3.08
Source: Elections Ontario

1985 Ontario general election
Party	Candidate	Votes	%	±%
Liberal	Hugh O'Neil	18,988	63.10	+6.32
Progressive Conservative	Neil Robertson	9,287	30.86	–5.50
New Democratic	Gene Morosan	1,817	6.04	–0.82
Total valid votes		30,092	99.72	
Total rejected ballots		86	0.29	–0.01
Turnout		30,178	60.66	+4.61
Eligible voters		49,751		
Liberal hold		Swing		+5.91
Source: Elections Ontario

1981 Ontario general election
Party	Candidate	Votes	%	±%
Liberal	Hugh O'Neil	14,861	56.78	+0.44
Progressive Conservative	George Mills	9,517	36.36	+3.70
New Democratic	Reg Pearson	1,795	6.86	–4.14
Total valid votes		26,173	99.70	
Total rejected ballots		78	0.30	+0.03
Turnout		26,251	56.04	–12.24
Eligible voters		46,840		
Liberal hold		Swing		–1.63
Source: Elections Ontario

1977 Ontario general election
Party	Candidate	Votes	%	±%
Liberal	Hugh O'Neil	17,264	56.34	+13.27
Progressive Conservative	Don Williams	10,009	32.66	–8.13
New Democratic	Mike Maloney	3,371	11.00	–5.14
Total valid votes		30,644	99.73	
Total rejected ballots		82	0.27	+0.04
Turnout		30,726	68.29	+0.41
Eligible voters		44,996		
Liberal hold		Swing		+10.70
Source: Elections Ontario

1975 Ontario general election
Party	Candidate	Votes	%	±%
Liberal	Hugh O'Neil	12,440	43.07	+14.09
Progressive Conservative	Robin Jeffrey	11,781	40.79	–16.57
New Democratic	Carson McLauchlan	4,663	16.14	+2.48
Total valid votes		28,884	99.77	
Total rejected ballots		66	0.23	–0.27
Turnout		28,950	67.88	+0.36
Eligible voters		42,649		
Liberal gain from Progressive Conservative		Swing		+15.33
Source: Elections Ontario

1971 Ontario general election
Party	Candidate	Votes	%	±%
Progressive Conservative	Richard Potter	15,066	57.36	+5.13
Liberal	Gerald A. Weaver	7,611	28.98	–4.52
New Democratic	Alan J. Deacon	3,588	13.66	–0.61
Total valid votes		26,265	99.50	
Total rejected ballots		132	0.50	+0.09
Turnout		26,397	67.52	–6.89
Eligible voters		39,093		
Progressive Conservative hold		Swing		+4.83
Source: Elections Ontario

1967 Ontario general election
Party	Candidate	Votes	%
Progressive Conservative	Richard Potter	11,410	52.23
Liberal	Donald Joss	7,319	33.50
New Democratic	Ian E. Reilly	3,117	14.27
Total valid votes		21,846	99.59
Total rejected ballots		89	0.41
Turnout		21,935	74.41
Eligible voters		29,478	
Progressive Conservative pickup new district.			
Source: Elections Ontario

== See also ==
- List of Ontario provincial electoral districts
- Canadian provincial electoral districts
