= Chris Ward (Canadian politician) =

Canadian politician (born 1949)

The Honourable Chris Ward ECO
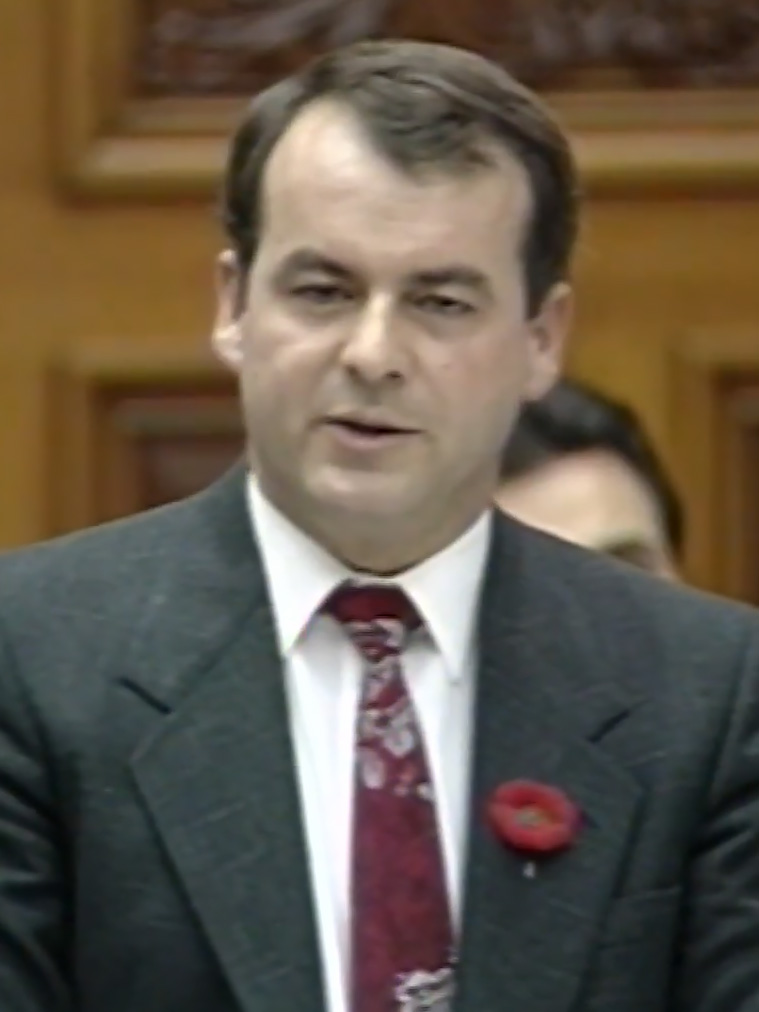
- Ward in 1987

Ontario MPP
- In office 1985–1990
- Preceded by: Ann Sloat
- Succeeded by: Don Abel
- Constituency: Wentworth North

Personal details
- Born: Christopher Campbell Ward; June 21, 1949 (age 77) Birmingham, England
- Party: Liberal
- Spouse: Carol Suzanne Hunter

Christopher Campbell Ward (born June 21, 1949) is a former politician in Ontario, Canada. He served in the Legislative Assembly of Ontario as a Liberal from 1985 to 1990 and was a cabinet minister in the government of David Peterson.

== Background ==
The son of Albert Charles Ward and Daniella Joy Griffiths, Ward was raised in Ontario and educated in Dundas. In 1971, he married Carol Suzanne Hunter.

== Politics ==
He was elected a ward councillor in Flamborough in 1978, a regional councillor in 1980 and mayor in 1982.

In 1984, Ward ran for the Ontario legislature in a by-election for the constituency of Wentworth North. He lost to Progressive Conservative Ann Sloat by 169 votes, but a few months later defeated Sloat by 5,168 votes in the 1985 provincial election amid a general surge in support for the Liberal Party. He was re-elected handily in the 1987 election.

Ward served as parliamentary assistant to the Minister of Health from June 26, 1985, to January 9, 1987, and as the assistant to Attorney General Ian Scott from January to September 1987. He was promoted to cabinet as Minister of Education on September 29, 1987. Following a cabinet shuffle on August 2, 1989, he was named Minister of Government Services and Government House Leader.

In the 1990 provincial election, Ward lost his seat to NDP candidate Don Abel by a mere 88 votes. During the campaign, Ward was targeted by a group of local lawyers who opposed the Peterson government's no-fault auto insurance program.

He attempted to return to the legislature in the 1995 election, but lost to Progressive Conservative candidate Toni Skarica by over 10,000 votes.

He supported Gerard Kennedy for the leadership of the Ontario Liberal Party in 1996.

=== Cabinet positions ===
Peterson ministry, Province of Ontario (1985–1990)
Cabinet posts (2)
Predecessor	Office	Successor
Richard Patten	Minister of Government Services; 1989–1990	Frances Lankin
Sean Conway	Minister of Education; 1987–1989	Sean Conway
Special Parliamentary Responsibilities
Predecessor	Title	Successor
Sean Conway	Government House Leader; 1989–1990	Shelley Martel

== Later life ==
After leaving politics, Ward became Vice-President of Strategic Planning and Communications for Canada's Research-based Pharmaceutical Companies. He now runs Ward Health Strategies, a consulting firm based in Toronto and Washington, D.C. He has provided briefings to legislators in several American states on behalf of the Pharmaceutical Research and Manufacturers of America.
