= Wentworth (provincial electoral district) =

Ontario electoral district

Defunct provincial electoral district
- Legislature: Legislative Assembly of Ontario
- District created: 1934
- District abolished: 1987
- First contested: 1934
- Last contested: 1985

Wentworth was a provincial riding in Ontario, Canada, that was created for the 1934 election when Wentworth South was renamed Wentworth. It was abolished prior to the 1987 election. It was redistributed into the ridings of Wentworth East and Hamilton Mountain before 1987 election.

== Members of Provincial Parliament ==
Wentworth
Assembly	Years	Member	Party
Renamed in 1934 from Wentworth South
19th	1934–1937	George Henry Bethune (Note: In 1938, the title of Member of the Legislative Assembly was officially changed to Member of Provincial Parliament. Previously, it was unofficially used in the media and in the Legislature.)	Liberal
20th	1937–1943	George Henry Bethune	Liberal
21st	1943–1945	William Robertson	Co-operative Commonwealth
22nd	1945–1948	William Robertson	Co-operative Commonwealth
23rd	1948–1951	Joseph Lees Easton	Co-operative Commonwealth
24th	1951–1955	Arthur John Child	Progressive Conservative
25th	1955–1959	Arthur John Child	Progressive Conservative
26th	1959–1963	Raymond Clare Edwards	Liberal
27th	1963–1967	Donald Ewen	Progressive Conservative
28th	1967–1971	Ian Deans	New Democratic
29th	1971–1975	Ian Deans	New Democratic
30th	1975–1977	Ian Deans	New Democratic
31st	1977–1979	Ian Deans	New Democratic
31st	1979–1981	Colin Isaacs	New Democratic
32nd	1981–1985	Gordon Howlett Dean	Progressive Conservative
33rd	1985–1987	Gordon Howlett Dean	Progressive Conservative
Merged into Wentworth East and Hamilton Mountain before 1987 election
Sourced from the Ontario Legislative Assembly
