= Lowell Green =

Canadian radio personality (1936–2026)

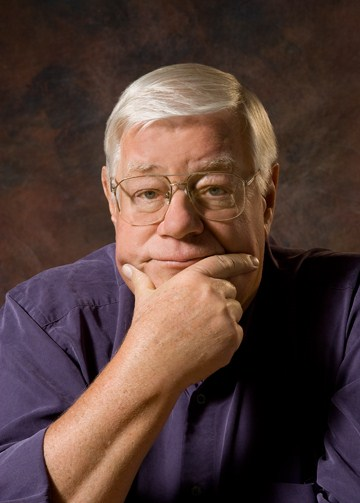
- Born: 7 July 1936; Ann Arbor, Michigan, U.S.
- Died: 14 February 2026 (aged 89); Ottawa, Ontario, Canada
- Spouse: Deborah Green
- Awards: Queen Elizabeth II Golden Jubilee Medal Queen Elizabeth II Diamond Jubilee Medal RCL Friendship Award CDS Medallion Senate 150th Anniversary Medal Helen Keller Fellowship Award Lifetime Achievement Award Golden Ribbon Canada Book Award
- Presenting career
- Show: The Lowell Green Show
- Station: CFRA Ottawa
- Time slot: Weekdays 10 am to 12pm
- Style: Talk radio
- Country: Canada
- Previous show: Greenline
- Website: lgreen.ca (archived)

Lowell Green (7 July 1936 – 14 February 2026) was a Canadian radio personality, journalist and author, best known as the host of The Lowell Green Show, a conservative morning talk show that aired on the Ottawa, Ontario, radio station CFRA. He wrote newspaper articles and autobiographical, historical and fictional books.

== Early life and education ==
Green was born in Ann Arbor, Michigan, United States, on 7 July 1936, to Canadian parents, and immigrated to Canada. He graduated from Macdonald Agricultural College of McGill University in Montreal, Quebec in 1956.

== Broadcasting career ==
Green started his radio broadcasting career in Brantford, Ontario, and subsequently moved to radio stations in Sudbury, Ontario, and Montreal, Quebec. In 1960, he was hired by G. Campbell McDonald at CFRA as a news and farm reporter. In 1966, he began hosting Greenline, and eventually became the longest-running open-line talk show host in North America. He retired briefly from radio in the 1980s, but returned in 1990.

In 1993, he returned to CFRA and hosted The Lowell Green Show until his official retirement on 4 January 2016. He continued contributing to the station's weekly "midday program News and Views with Rob Snow" until a Bell Media restructuring in mid-November 2019. On occasion, he could be heard calling into The Rob Snow Show, now airing on CIWW.

Green was controversial at times. Several complaints have been made against him to the Canadian Broadcast Standards Council (CBSC). In a 1994 complaint to the CBSC, listeners alleged that Green had been rude and abusive to a caller who identified herself as a Christian. Although the CBSC determined that Green's conduct had contravened its guidelines on discrimination, it also decided that the station had responded appropriately, and the group did not prescribe any further action. In 2006 and 2008, the council censured Green for his treatment of a Muslim man who challenged Green on the way the radio show host portrays Islam. In June 2017, there was controversy as to whether Indigo Books and Music had pulled Green's latest book, Amazing But True!, from its bookshelves in stores in Canada.

On 31 December 2019, in an emotional farewell, Green ended his radio career on CFRA with the following final words:

I believe, that we all have a responsibility, more than that, we have a duty, to do whatever we can, in whatever fashion we can, to make a better world for our children.

And CFRA Nation, you have done your duty, and I hope and pray that you'll continue to do so. Thank you all, goodbye.

On 14 September 2020, Green returned online with The Island of Sanity, a one-hour podcast available on various Internet platforms, which was pared down to thirty minutes on 13 October 2020 and featured live on Internet radio and the social networking platform Facebook.

== Activism and philanthropy ==
In a late 1960s protest, Green urged his listeners to fill bottles of water taken from the polluted Rideau River, and to ship them to the Ontario legislature at Queen's Park. His listeners shipped many bottles and containers of polluted water. Canada Post objected, and stopped accepting them. According to Green, the uproar led to the creation of the Rideau Valley Conservation Authority and the start of a clean-up effort of the Rideau River and the Ottawa River.

With his 1967 Save The Centennial Flame Campaign, a month of broadcasts, and over three-thousand petitions from listeners, the Centennial Flame remains on Parliament Hill.

In 1975, after the school shooting that occurred at the St. Pius X High School in Ottawa, Green and thousands of his supporters joined his Fire Arms Safety Association. It lobbied and petitioned Members of Parliament, while he appeared before parliamentary and senate committees tasked with the process of making policy and enacting new gun law legislation in Canada. In order to encourage Quebecers to vote "No" in the 1995 Quebec Independence referendum, he promoted and helped organize a political Unity Rally which was held in Place du Canada in Montreal, Quebec.

With the Reverend Norman Johnston, he founded the Ottawa chapter of the Big Brothers and was founder of the Help Santa Toy Parade in Ottawa. He contributed to ongoing efforts to help modernize and renovate the Saint Vincent Hospital and the Élisabeth Bruyère Hospital in Ottawa. He was a founder of the Sunday Herald in Ottawa which was in 1988 purchased by the Ottawa Sun.

Green served on the boards of the United Way, the John Howard Society, the Drug Addiction Research Council, and on the town council in West Hull, Quebec.

== Politics ==
Green attempted to win the Liberal nomination for the federal riding of Pontiac during the 1968 federal election, but lost this bid to Thomas Lefebvre. On 13 December 1984, Green ran for the Ontario Liberal Party in a provincial by-election in Ottawa Centre. The by-election was called after NDP Michael Cassidy resigned his seat. He came third, losing to NDP candidate Evelyn Gigantes. Green blamed this loss on his "sharp" personality and a low voter turnout.

Green's politics shifted considerably to the right in later years. On 24 October 2020, Green publicly endorsed Matthew Fisher, a former journalist who was a foreign correspondent for The Globe and Mail, Sun Media and Postmedia Network for 34 years, to become the Conservative MP for Kanata—Carleton.

== Death ==
Green died on 14 February 2026, at the age of 89.

== Honours and awards ==
=== Government and state honours ===
- Queen Elizabeth II Golden Jubilee Medal (2002), awarded for contributions to Canadian public life.
- Queen Elizabeth II Diamond Jubilee Medal (2012), awarded in recognition of service to Canada.
- Senate of Canada 150th Anniversary Medal (2017), commemorating contributions to Canadian civic life.
- Chief of the Defence Staff Medallion, awarded for support of members of the Canadian Armed Forces and veterans.

=== Broadcasting and professional awards ===
- Award for coverage of the Springhill mining disaster (1958), recognizing early career reporting.
- Recognition from the International Olympic Committee (1976), for broadcast coverage of the 1976 Summer Olympics in Montreal.
- Radio Television Digital News Association of Canada Lifetime Achievement Award (2006), honouring his career in broadcast journalism.
- Canadian Association of Broadcasters Golden Ribbon Award for Outstanding Community Service (2006).

=== Community and service recognition ===
- Helen Keller Fellowship Award from Lions Clubs International, presented after an on-air fundraising campaign raised approximately CA$280,000 for a child requiring medical treatment.
- Friendship Award from the Royal Canadian Legion, recognizing advocacy on behalf of veterans.
- Community Builders Award, displayed at Ottawa City Hall, recognizing civic engagement.

=== Literary recognition ===
- Canada Book Award, recognizing his published works.
- Nominee, Governor General's Pierre Berton Award (2017), presented by Canada's National History Society for contributions to popular Canadian history writing.

=== Civic honours ===
- Ottawa hospital wing named in his honour.
- City of Ottawa day proclaimed in his honour.

=== Parliamentary tributes and public commendations ===
- Recognized in the House of Commons of Canada by the Honourable Pierre Poilievre (21 November 2017).
- Commendations issued by Prime Ministers John Diefenbaker, Lester B. Pearson, Pierre Trudeau, and Stephen Harper.

== Books ==
The following is a list of works authored by Lowell Green. His latest book, Amazing But True! 150 Fascinating Stories About Canada, was in 2017 nominated for the Governor General's Pierre Berton Award, presented annually by Canada's National History Society for works celebrating Canadian history. He also received the Canada Book Award which recognizes and promotes Canadian authors.

- Death in October. Renfrew, Ontario: General Store, 1996. ISBN 1-894439-19-8
- The Pork Chop and Other Stories: A Memoir. Carp, Ontario: Creative Bound Resources, 2005. ISBN 1-894439-19-8
- How the Granola-crunching, Tree-hugging Thug Huggers are Wrecking Our Country! Carp, Ontario: Creative Bound Resources, 2006. ISBN 1-894439-30-9
- It's Hard to Say Goodbye. Carp, Ontario: Creative Bound Resources, 2007. ISBN 1-894439-37-6
- Hoodwinked: The Spy Who Didn't Die. Carp, Ontario: Spruce Ridge, 2009. ISBN 978-0-9813149-0-7
- Mayday. Mayday: curb immigration and stop multiculturalism, or it's the end of the Canada we know. Carp, Ontario: Spruce Ridge, 2010. ISBN 978-0-9813149-1-4
- Here's proof only we conservatives have our heads screwed on straight. Carp, Ontario: Spruce Ridge, 2011. ISBN 978-0-9813149-2-1
- Why Now Is The Perfect Time to Wave a Friendly Goodbye to Quebec. Carp, Ontario: Spruce Ridge, 2013. ASIN B00HL02ZIW
- Amazing But True!: 150 Fascinating Stories About Canada! Carp, Ontario: Spruce Ridge, 2017. ISBN 9780981314952
- Common Sense for a Wounded Nation. Carp, Ontario: Spruce Ridge Publishing Inc, 2020. ISBN 9780981314969
