= 33rd Parliament of Ontario =

Canadian state government, 1985–1987

- Minority parliament

Parliament leaders
- Premier: Frank Miller
- David Peterson
- Leader of the Opposition: David Peterson
- Frank Miller
- Larry Grossman

Party caucuses
- Government: Progressive Conservative Party (Note: The Progressive Conservative Party briefly formed government but was defeated in a confidence vote.) (until June 1985)
- Liberal Party (after June 1985)
- Opposition: Liberal Party (until June 1985)
- Progressive Conservative Party (after June 1985)
- Recognized: New Democratic Party (Note: Providing confidence and supply for Liberal government.)
- Members: 125 MPP seats

Sovereign
- Monarch: Elizabeth II; 6 February 1952 – present
- Lieutenant governor: John Black Aird
- Lincoln Alexander
| ← 32nd | → 34th |

The 33rd Legislative Assembly of Ontario was held from June 4, 1985, until July 31, 1987, just prior to the 1987 general election.

Hugh Alden Edighoffer served as speaker for the assembly.

| ▀ | ▀ | ▀ | ▀ | ▀ | ▀ | ▀ | ▀ | ▀ | ▀ | ▀ | ▀ | ▀ | ▀ | ▀ | ▀ | ▀ | ▀ | ▀ | ▀ | ▀ | ▀ | ▀ | ▀ | ▀ | ▀ | ▀ |
| ▀ | ▀ | ▀ | ▀ | ▀ | ▀ | ▀ | ▀ | ▀ | ▀ | ▀ | ▀ | ▀ | ▀ | ▀ | ▀ | ▀ | ▀ | ▀ | ▀ | ▀ | ▀ | ▀ | ▀ | ▀ | ▀ | ▀ | ▀ |
| ▀ | ▀ | ▀ | ▀ | ▀ | ▀ | ▀ | ▀ | ▀ | ▀ | ▀ | ▀ | ▀ | ▀ | ▀ | ▀ | ▀ | ▀ | ▀ | ▀ | ▀ | ▀ | ▀ | ▀ | ▀ | ▀ | ▀ | ▀ |
▀
▀
▀
| ▀ | ▀ | ▀ | ▀ | ▀ | ▀ | ▀ | ▀ | ▀ | ▀ | ▀ | ▀ | ▀ | ▀ | ▀ | ▀ | ▀ | ▀ | ▀ | ▀ | ▀ | ▀ | ▀ | ▀ | ▀ | ▀ |
| ▀ | ▀ | ▀ | ▀ | ▀ | ▀ | ▀ | ▀ | ▀ | ▀ | ▀ | ▀ | ▀ | ▀ | ▀ | ▀ | ▀ | ▀ | ▀ | ▀ | ▀ | ▀ | ▀ | ▀ | ▀ |
| ▀ | ▀ | ▀ | ▀ | ▀ | ▀ | ▀ | ▀ | ▀ | ▀ | ▀ | ▀ | ▀ | ▀ | ▀ | ▀ | ▀ | ▀ | ▀ | ▀ | ▀ | ▀ | ▀ | ▀ | ▀ |

Twenty-two days into the 33rd Parliament, Premier Frank Miller resigned following the defeat of his Progressive Conservative government in a motion of no confidence. Upon Miller's resignation, Lieutenant Governor John Black Aird appointed David Peterson, then Leader of the Opposition and Leader of the Ontario Liberal Party, as Premier. Peterson went on to form a minority government with the support of the Ontario New Democratic Party.

| ▀ | ▀ | ▀ | ▀ | ▀ | ▀ | ▀ | ▀ | ▀ | ▀ | ▀ | ▀ | ▀ | ▀ | ▀ | ▀ | ▀ | ▀ | ▀ | ▀ | ▀ | ▀ | ▀ | ▀ | ▀ | ▀ | ▀ |
| ▀ | ▀ | ▀ | ▀ | ▀ | ▀ | ▀ | ▀ | ▀ | ▀ | ▀ | ▀ | ▀ | ▀ | ▀ | ▀ | ▀ | ▀ | ▀ | ▀ | ▀ | ▀ | ▀ | ▀ | ▀ | ▀ | ▀ | ▀ | ▀ |
| ▀ | ▀ | ▀ | ▀ | ▀ | ▀ | ▀ | ▀ | ▀ | ▀ | ▀ | ▀ | ▀ | ▀ | ▀ | ▀ | ▀ | ▀ | ▀ | ▀ | ▀ | ▀ | ▀ | ▀ | ▀ | ▀ | ▀ | ▀ | ▀ |
▀
▀
▀
| ▀ | ▀ | ▀ | ▀ | ▀ | ▀ | ▀ | ▀ | ▀ | ▀ | ▀ | ▀ | ▀ | ▀ | ▀ | ▀ | ▀ | ▀ | ▀ | ▀ | ▀ | ▀ | ▀ | ▀ | ▀ | ▀ |
| ▀ | ▀ | ▀ | ▀ | ▀ | ▀ | ▀ | ▀ | ▀ | ▀ | ▀ | ▀ | ▀ | ▀ | ▀ | ▀ | ▀ | ▀ | ▀ | ▀ | ▀ | ▀ | ▀ | ▀ | ▀ | ▀ |
| ▀ | ▀ | ▀ | ▀ | ▀ | ▀ | ▀ | ▀ | ▀ | ▀ | ▀ | ▀ | ▀ | ▀ | ▀ | ▀ | ▀ | ▀ | ▀ | ▀ | ▀ | ▀ | ▀ | ▀ | ▀ |

== Members ==
| Riding | Member | Party | First elected / previously elected | No. of terms | Notes |
|---|---|---|---|---|---|
| Algoma | Bud Wildman | New Democratic Party | 1975 | 4th term | |
| Algoma—Manitoulin | John Gordon Lane | Progressive Conservative | 1971 | 5th term | |
| Armourdale | Bruce McCaffrey | Progressive Conservative | 1977 | 3rd term | |
| Beaches—Woodbine | Marion Bryden | New Democratic Party | 1975 | 4th term | |
| Bellwoods | Ross A. McClellan | New Democratic Party | 1975 | 4th term | |
| Brampton | Bob Callahan | Liberal | 1985 | 1st term | |
| Brant—Oxford—Norfolk | Robert Nixon | Liberal | 1962 | 8th term | |
| Brantford | Phil Gillies | Progressive Conservative | 1981 | 2nd term | |
| Brock | Peter Partington | Progressive Conservative | 1985 | 1st term | |
| Burlington South | Cam Jackson | Progressive Conservative | 1985 | 1st term | |
| Cambridge | Bill Barlow | Progressive Conservative | 1981 | 2nd term | |
| Carleton | Robert C. Mitchell | Progressive Conservative | 1980 | 3rd term | |
| Carleton East | Gilles E. Morin | Liberal | 1985 | 1st term | |
| Carleton-Grenville | Norm Sterling | Progressive Conservative | 1977 | 3rd term | |
| Chatham—Kent | Maurice Louis Bossy | Liberal | 1985 | 1st term | |
| Cochrane North | Jacques Noe René Fontaine | Liberal | 1985 | 1st term | |
| Cochrane South | Alan William Pope | Progressive Conservative | 1977 | 3rd term | |
| Cornwall | Luc Bernard Guindon | Progressive Conservative | 1985 | 1st term | |
| Don Mills | Dennis Roy Timbrell | Progressive Conservative | 1971 | 5th term | |
| Dovercourt | Antonio Lupusella | New Democratic Party | 1975 | 4th term | |
| Dovercourt | Antonio Lupusella | Liberal | 1975 | 4th term | |
| Downsview | Joseph Cordiano | Liberal | 1985 | 1st term | |
| Dufferin—Simcoe | George R. McCague | Progressive Conservative | 1975 | 4th term | |
| Durham East | Sammy Lawrence Cureatz | Progressive Conservative | 1977 | 3rd term | |
| Durham West | George Ashe | Progressive Conservative | 1977 | 3rd term | |
| Durham—York | Kenneth Ross Stevenson | Progressive Conservative | 1981 | 2nd term | |
| Eglinton | David James McFadden | Progressive Conservative | 1985 | 1st term | |
| Elgin | Ronald Keith McNeil | Progressive Conservative | 1958 | 9th term | |
| Erie | Raymond Louis Haggerty | Liberal | 1967 | 6th term | |
| Essex North | Patrick Michael Hayes | New Democratic Party | 1985 | 1st term | |
| Essex South | Remo J. Mancini | Liberal | 1975 | 4th term | |
| Etobicoke | Ed Thomas Philip | New Democratic Party | 1975 | 4th term | |
| Fort William | Michael Patrick Hennessy | Progressive Conservative | 1977 | 3rd term | |
| Frontenac—Addington | Lawrence George South | Liberal | 1985 | 1st term | |
| Grey | Robert Carson McKessock | Liberal | 1975 | 4th term | |
| Grey—Bruce | Edward Carson Sargent | Liberal | 1963 | 7th term | |
| Haldimand—Norfolk | Gordon Irvin Miller | Liberal | 1975 | 4th term | |
| Halton—Burlington | Donald S. Knight | Liberal | 1985 | 1st term | |
| Hamilton Centre | Lily Oddie Munro | Liberal | 1985 | 1st term | |
| Hamilton East | Bob Warren Mackenzie | New Democratic Party | 1975 | 4th term | |
| Hamilton Mountain | Brian Albert Charlton | New Democratic Party | 1977 | 3rd term | |
| Hamilton West | Richard Alexander Allen | New Democratic Party | 1982 | 2nd term | |
| Hastings—Peterborough | James Pollock | Progressive Conservative | 1981 | 2nd term | |
| High Park—Swansea | Yuri Shymko | Progressive Conservative | 1981 | 2nd term | |
| Humber | Jim Henderson | Liberal | 1985 | 1st term | |
| Huron—Bruce | Murray John Elston | Liberal | 1981 | 2nd term | |
| Huron—Middlesex | John Keith Riddell | Liberal | 1973 | 5th term | |
| Kenora | Leo Edward Bernier | Progressive Conservative | 1966 | 7th term | |
| Kent—Elgin | James Fitzgerald McGuigan | Liberal | 1977 | 3rd term | |
| Kingston and the Islands | Kenneth A. Keyes | Liberal | 1985 | 1st term | |
| Kitchener | David R. Cooke | Liberal | 1985 | 1st term | |
| Kitchener—Wilmot | John Sweeney | Liberal | 1975 | 4th term | |
| Lake Nipigon | Gilles Pouliot | New Democratic Party | 1985 | 1st term | |
| Lakeshore | Ruth Anna Grier | New Democratic Party | 1985 | 1st term | |
| Lambton | David William Smith | Liberal | 1985 | 1st term | |
| Lanark | Douglas Jack Wiseman | Progressive Conservative | 1971 | 5th term | |
| Leeds | Robert W. Runciman | Progressive Conservative | 1981 | 2nd term | |
| Lincoln | Philip W. Andrewes | Progressive Conservative | 1981 | 2nd term | |
| London Centre | David Robertson Peterson | Liberal | 1975 | 4th term | Premier and Party Leader |
| London North | Ronald George Van Horne | Liberal | 1977 | 3rd term | |
| London South | Elizabeth "Joan" Smith | Liberal | 1985 | 1st term | |
| Middlesex | Douglas Richard Reycraft | Liberal | 1985 | 1st term | |
| Mississauga East | Milton Edward Charles Gregory | Progressive Conservative | 1975 | 4th term | |
| Mississauga North | Steven Offer | Liberal | 1985 | 1st term | |
| Mississauga South | Margaret Marland | Progressive Conservative | 1985 | 1st term | |
| Muskoka | Frank Stuart Miller | Progressive Conservative | 1971 | 5th term | Premier and Party Leader |
| Niagara Falls | Vincent George Kerrio | Liberal | 1975 | 4th term | |
| Nickel Belt | Floyd Laughren | New Democratic Party | 1971 | 5th term | |
| Nipissing | Michael Harris | Progressive Conservative | 1981 | 2nd term | |
| Northumberland | Howard Nicholas Sheppard | Progressive Conservative | 1981 | 2nd term | |
| Oakville | Terrance P. O'Connor | Progressive Conservative | 1985 | 1st term | |
| Oakwood | Anthony William Grande | New Democratic Party | 1975 | 4th term | |
| Oriole | Elinor Caplan | Liberal | 1985 | 1st term | |
| Oshawa | Michael James Breaugh | New Democratic Party | 1975 | 4th term | |
| Ottawa Centre | Evelyn Adelaide Gigantes | New Democratic Party | 1975, (Note: Carleton East) 1984 | 4th term* | |
| Ottawa East | Bernard C. Grandmaître | Liberal | 1984 | 2nd term | |
| Ottawa South | Claude Frederick Bennett | Progressive Conservative | 1971 | 5th term | |
| Ottawa West | Reuben Conrad Baetz | Progressive Conservative | 1977 | 3rd term | |
| Oxford | Richard L. Treleaven | Progressive Conservative | 1981 | 2nd term | |
| Parkdale | Tony Ruprecht | Liberal | 1981 | 2nd term | |
| Parry Sound | Ernie Eves | Progressive Conservative | 1981 | 2nd term | |
| Perth | Hugh Alden Edighoffer | Liberal | 1967 | 6th term | |
| Peterborough | John Melville Turner | Progressive Conservative | 1971, 1977 | 4th term* | |
| Port Arthur | James Francis Foulds | New Democratic Party | 1971 | 5th term | |
| Prescott and Russell | Jean Poirier | Liberal | 1984 | 2nd term | |
| Prince Edward—Lennox | James A. Taylor | Progressive Conservative | 1971 | 5th term | |
| Quinte | Hugh Patrick O'Neil | Liberal | 1975 | 4th term | |
| Rainy River | Franklin Jack Pierce | Progressive Conservative | 1985 | 1st term | |
| Renfrew North | Sean Conway | Liberal | 1975 | 4th term | |
| Renfrew South | Paul Joseph Yakabuski | Progressive Conservative | 1963 | 7th term | Died in 1987 |
| Riverdale | David R. Reville | New Democratic Party | 1985 | 1st term | |
| Sarnia | Andy Brandt | Progressive Conservative | 1981 | 2nd term | |
| Sault Ste. Marie | Karl Avid Morin-Strom | New Democratic Party | 1985 | 1st term | |
| Scarborough Centre | William C. Davis | Progressive Conservative | 1985 | 1st term | |
| Scarborough East | Edward A. Fulton | Liberal | 1985 | 1st term | |
| Scarborough North | Alvin Curling | Liberal | 1985 | 1st term | |
| Scarborough West | Richard Frank Johnston | New Democratic Party | 1979 | 3rd term | |
| Scarborough—Ellesmere | David William Warner | New Democratic Party | 1977, 1985 | 2nd term* | |
| Simcoe Centre | Earl W. Rowe | Progressive Conservative | 1985 | 1st term | |
| Simcoe East | Allan Kenneth McLean | Progressive Conservative | 1981 | 2nd term | |
| St. Andrew—St. Patrick | Lawrence Sheldon Grossman | Progressive Conservative | 1975 | 4th term | Party Leader |
| St. Catharines | Jim Bradley | Liberal | 1977 | 3rd term | |
| St. David | Ian G. Scott | Liberal | 1985 | 1st term | |
| St. George | Susan A. Fish | Progressive Conservative | 1981 | 2nd term | |
| Stormont—Dundas—Glengarry | Noble Villeneuve | Progressive Conservative | 1983 | 2nd term | |
| Sudbury | Jim Gordon | Progressive Conservative | 1981 | 2nd term | |
| Sudbury East | Elie Walter Martel | New Democratic Party | 1967 | 6th term | |
| Timiskaming | David Ramsay | New Democratic Party (Note: became Liberal in October 1986) | 1985 | 1st term | |
| Timiskaming | David Ramsay | Liberal | 1985 | 1st term | |
| Victoria—Haliburton | John F. Eakins | Liberal | 1975 | 4th term | |
| Waterloo North | Herbert Arnold Epp | Liberal | 1977 | 3rd term | |
| Welland—Thorold | Mel Swart | New Democratic Party | 1975 | 4th term | |
| Wellington South | Rick Eugenio Ferraro | Liberal | 1985 | 1st term | |
| Wellington—Dufferin—Peel | John McLellan Johnson | Progressive Conservative | 1975 | 4th term | |
| Wentworth | Gordon Howlett Dean | Progressive Conservative | 1981 | 2nd term | |
| Wentworth North | Christopher Campbell Ward | Liberal | 1985 | 1st term | |
| Wilson Heights | Monte Kwinter | Liberal | 1985 | 1st term | |
| Windsor—Riverside | Dave Cooke | New Democratic Party | 1977 | 3rd term | |
| Windsor—Sandwich | William Munro Wrye | Liberal | 1981 | 2nd term | |
| Windsor—Walkerville | Bernard Newman | Liberal | 1959 | 8th term | |
| York Centre | W. Donald Cousens | Progressive Conservative | 1981 | 2nd term | |
| York East | Robert Goldwin Elgie (Note: resigned to accept appointment) | Progressive Conservative | 1977 | 3rd term | Resigned seat in 1985 |
| York East | Christine Hart (1986) | Liberal | 1986 | 1st term | Elected in by-election in 1986 |
| York Mills | Bette Stephenson | Progressive Conservative | 1975 | 4th term | |
| York North | Greg Sorbara | Liberal | 1985 | 1st term | |
| York South | Bob Keith Rae | New Democratic Party | 1982 | 2nd term | Party Leader |
| York West | Nicholas Georges Leluk | Progressive Conservative | 1971 | 5th term | |
| Yorkview | Claudio Polsinelli | Liberal | 1985 | 1st term | |
