= Mississauga North (provincial electoral district) =

Former provincial electoral district in Ontario, Canada

Ontario electoral district

Defunct provincial electoral district
- Legislature: Legislative Assembly of Ontario
- District created: 1975
- District abolished: 1999
- First contested: 1975
- Last contested: 1995

Demographics
- Census division: Peel
- Census subdivision: Mississauga / Brampton

Mississauga North was a provincial electoral district in Ontario, in the municipal areas of Mississauga and Brampton from 1975 to 1999. Prior to 1975 it was contained within the ridings of Peel North and Peel. After 1999 it was re-distributed to two new ridings: Brampton West—Mississauga and Bramalea—Gore—Malton—Springdale.

== Members of Provincial Parliament ==
Mississauga North
Assembly	Years	Member	Party
Created from Peel and Peel North in 1975
30th	1975–1977	Terry David Jones	Progressive Conservative
31st	1977–1981	Terry David Jones	Progressive Conservative
32nd	1981–1985	Terry David Jones	Progressive Conservative
33rd	1985–1987	Steve Offer	Liberal
34th	1987–1990	Steve Offer	Liberal
35th	1990–1995	Steve Offer	Liberal
36th	1995–1999	John Snobelen	Progressive Conservative
Sourced from the Ontario Legislative Assembly
Merged into Brampton West—Mississauga and Bramalea—Gore—Malton—Springdale before the 1999 election

== Election results ==
1995 Ontario general election
Party	Candidate	Votes	%	±%
Progressive Conservative	John Snobelen	22,095	47.76	+23.87
Liberal	Steve Offer	17,681	38.22	+0.37
New Democratic	Dan Shekhar	5,283	11.42	–22.12
Green	John Boddy	1,206	2.61	–0.22
Total valid votes		46,265	99.04	
Total rejected, unmarked and declined ballots		447	0.96	–0.53
Turnout		46,712	57.37	–0.40
Eligible voters		81,425		
Progressive Conservative gain from Liberal		Swing		+22.99
Source: Elections Ontario

1990 Ontario general election
Party	Candidate	Votes	%	±%
Liberal	Steve Offer	12,658	37.85	–18.18
New Democratic	Jean E. Foster	11,216	33.54	+9.93
Progressive Conservative	John Snobelen	7,990	23.89	+3.52
Green	Ken W. Moores	946	2.83	–
Independent	Howard Baker	632	1.89	–
Total valid votes		33,442	98.52	
Total rejected, unmarked and declined ballots		504	1.48	+0.98
Turnout		33,946	57.77	+3.85
Eligible voters		58,764		
Liberal hold		Swing		–14.05
Source: Elections Ontario

1987 Ontario general election
Party	Candidate	Votes	%	±%
Liberal	Steve Offer	14,604	56.03	+14.34
New Democratic	John Moszynski	6,153	23.61	+4.21
Progressive Conservative	Gabe Spoletini	5,309	20.37	–18.54
Total valid votes		26,066	99.50	
Total rejected ballots		131	0.50	–0.01
Turnout		26,197	53.92	–0.53
Eligible voters		48,588		
Liberal hold		Swing		+5.06
Source: Elections Ontario

1985 Ontario general election
Party	Candidate	Votes	%	±%
Liberal	Steve Offer	21,369	41.69	+16.42
Progressive Conservative	Terry David Jones	19,945	38.91	–17.36
New Democratic	Sylvia Weylie	9,943	19.40	+0.94
Total valid votes		51,257	99.49	
Total rejected ballots		265	0.51	+0.13
Turnout		51,522	54.45	+5.09
Eligible voters		94,626		
Liberal gain from Progressive Conservative		Swing		+16.89
Source: Elections Ontario

1981 Ontario general election
Party	Candidate	Votes	%	±%
Progressive Conservative	Terry David Jones	20,331	56.27	+9.71
Liberal	John Brooks	9,130	25.27	+8.88
New Democratic	Sylvia Weylie	6,667	18.45	–17.30
Total valid votes		36,128	99.61	
Total rejected ballots		141	0.39	+0.05
Turnout		36,269	49.36	–13.64
Eligible voters		73,486		
Progressive Conservative hold		Swing		+0.41
Source: Elections Ontario

1977 Ontario general election
Party	Candidate	Votes	%	±%
Progressive Conservative	Terry David Jones	16,151	46.56	+11.02
New Democratic	David Busby	12,401	35.75	+1.45
Liberal	Al LaRochelle	5,684	16.39	–13.77
Libertarian	Betty Cerar	380	1.10	–
Communist	Anna Sideris	71	0.20	–
Total valid votes		34,687	99.66	
Total rejected ballots		117	0.34	+0.01
Turnout		34,804	62.99	–4.28
Eligible voters		55,251		
Progressive Conservative hold		Swing		+4.78
Source: Elections Ontario

1975 Ontario general election
Party	Candidate	Votes	%
Progressive Conservative	Terry David Jones	11,001	35.55
New Democratic	David Busby	10,616	34.30
Liberal	Vince Zuccaro	9,332	30.15
Total valid votes		30,949	99.67
Total rejected ballots		101	0.33
Turnout		31,050	67.28
Eligible voters		46,153	
Progressive Conservative pickup new district.			
Source: Elections Ontario

== See also ==
- List of Ontario provincial electoral districts
- Canadian provincial electoral districts
