= 1985 Ontario general election =

Canadian provincial election

- May 2, 1985

125 seats in the 33rd Legislative Assembly of Ontario 63 seats needed for a majority
- Turnout: 61.55%
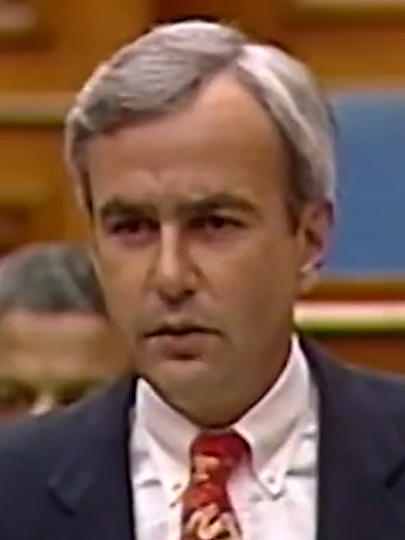

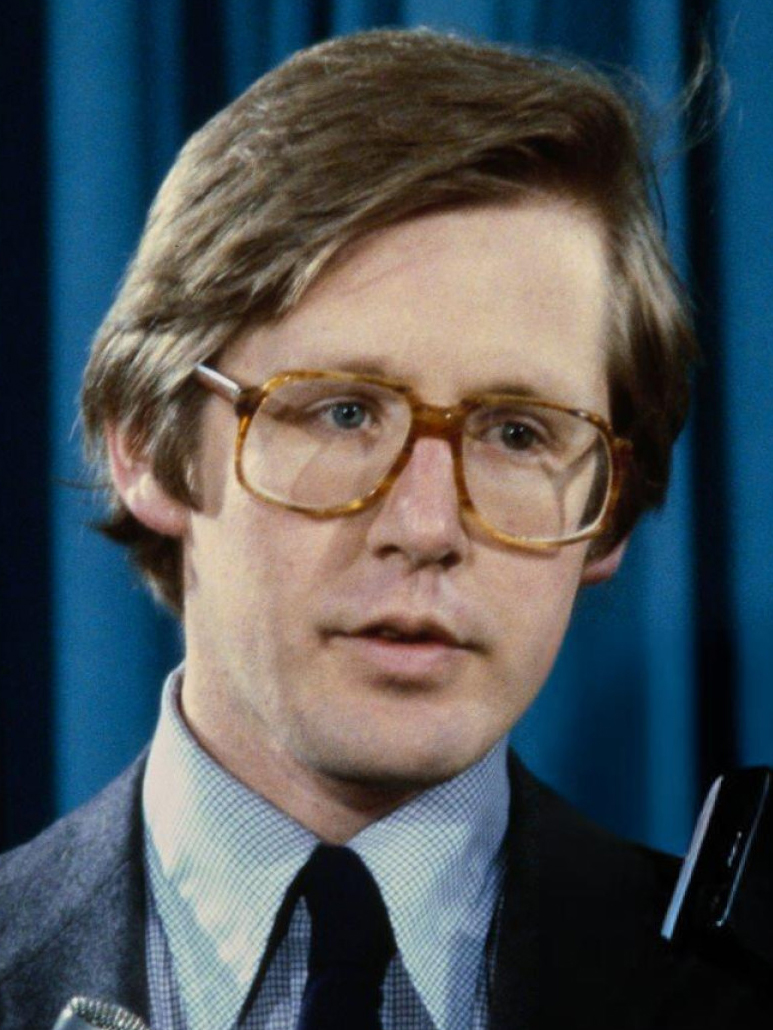
| | First party | Second party | Third party |
|---|---|---|---|
| Leader | Frank Miller | David Peterson | Bob Rae |
| Party | Progressive Conservative | Liberal | New Democratic |
| Leader since | January 26, 1985 | February 21, 1982 | February 7, 1982 |
| Leader's seat | Muskoka | London Centre | York South |
| Last election | 70 | 34 | 21 |
| Seats won | 52 | 48 | 25 |
| Seat change | ▼18 | ▲14 | ▲4 |
| Popular vote | 1,349,168 | 1,377,965 | 857,743 |
| Percentage | 37.1% | 37.9% | 23.6% |
| Swing | ▼7.3pp | ▲5.2pp | ▲2.4pp |
Premier before election
Frank Miller
Progressive Conservative
Premier after election
David Peterson
Liberal

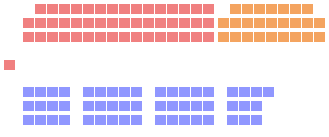
Diagram of the 1985 election results in the Provincial Legislature

The 1985 Ontario general election was held on May 2, 1985, to elect members to the Legislative Assembly of Ontario in the province of Ontario, Canada. The Progressive Conservatives won the most seats, but came short of a majority, and lost the popular vote to the Liberals. This left the NDP with the balance of power in the 33rd Legislative Assembly of Ontario.

Shortly afterward, the 42 years of PC governance in Ontario came to an end by a confidence vote defeating Premier Frank Miller's minority government. David Peterson's Liberals then formed a minority government with the support of Bob Rae's New Democratic Party.

== Prelude ==
Around Thanksgiving in 1984, Ontario Premier Bill Davis announced that he would be stepping down from his longtime post and as leader of the Ontario PCs in early 1985. In office since 1971, he had a string of electoral victories by pursuing a moderate agenda and by relying on the skill of the Big Blue Machine team of advisors. Davis, who remained generally popular throughout his term in office, would unveil a surprise legacy project: full funding for Ontario's separate Catholic school system, which would become known as Bill 30. That decision was supported by both other parties but was generally unpopular, especially in the PC base.

The subsequent leadership race saw the party divide into two rough camps. The moderate and mainly-urban wing was represented by the second-place finisher, Larry Grossman. The more conservative rural faction backed the eventual victor, Frank Miller. After Miller's victory at the convention, the party's factions failed to reconcile, which was especially important since many moderate members of the Big Blue Machine were pushed aside.

== Election ==
Despite those problems, the PCs remained far ahead in the polls, and when Miller called an election just six weeks after becoming premier, he was about 20% ahead of the Liberals. Over the campaign, however, the PC lead began to shrink as the Liberals waged a highly effective campaign. During the campaign, the separate schools question re-emerged when the Anglican prelate of Toronto, Archbishop Lewis Garnsworthy, held a news conference on the issue in which he compared Davis' methods in pushing through the reform to Adolf Hitler, saying: "This is how Hitler changed education in Germany, by exactly the same process, by decree. I won't take that back." Garnsworthy was much criticized for his remarks, but the issue was revived, which alienated the PC base, some of whom chose to stay home on election day.

The election held May 2, 1985, ended in a stalemate. The PCs emerged with a much-reduced caucus of 52 seats. The Liberals won 48 seats but won slightly more of the popular vote. The NDP held the balance of power, with 25 seats. Despite taking 14 seats from the PCs, the Liberals were somewhat disappointed, as they felt that they had their first realistic chance of winning government in recent memory. The NDP was also disappointed by the election result, as the party had been nearly tied with the Liberals for popular support for several years and had hoped to surpass them.

== Aftermath ==
The incumbent PCs intended to remain in power with a minority government, as they had done on two occasions under Davis' leadership. Rae and the NDP had little interest in supporting a continuation of PC rule, while the Liberals were also more amenable to a partnership compared to in the 1970's. Among other things, the Liberals repeatedly pointed out that (again, unlike in the previous decade) their party had won the popular vote and therefore, in their view, had at least as much of a right to govern the province as the Conservatives. The NDP began negotiations on May 13 to reach an agreement with the Liberals. Rae and Peterson signed an accord on May 29 that would see a number of NDP priorities put into law in exchange for an NDP motion of non-confidence in Miller's government and the NDP's support of the Liberals. The NDP agreed to support a Liberal minority government for two years during which the Liberals agreed not to call an election.

Miller, apprised of negotiations, considered a plan to address the province on television two days before the throne speech, disown funding for Catholic schools, and announce he was meeting with the Lieutenant Governor to request an election before a confidence vote could take place. Believing that the Lieutenant Governor would have to call an election if requested before the confidence vote, Miller refused to do so since he believed the party's finances to be too fragile for a second campaign and that repudiating a key Davis policy would tear the party apart.

In what was by then a foregone conclusion, on June 18, 1985 the PC government was defeated by the passage of a motion of no confidence introduced by Rae. Lieutenant-Governor John Black Aird then asked Peterson to form a government. Privately, Aird's actions suited Miller since even without party infighting and finances to consider, the PC's internal polling had by then clearly indicated the voters did not want another election and that even if the Lieutenant-Governor could have been convinced to call one, the Liberals would have been likely to win in a landslide. The actions of Aird, who was appointed by former Liberal Prime Minister Pierre Trudeau, therefore allowed Miller to portray his relinquishing of the premiership as a grudging acquiescence that he was forced to undertake by a representative of the sovereign, who the PCs would subsequently claim had breached constitutional convention and inappropriately engaged in partisanship to elevate the second-place party to government. In any case, Miller resigned on June 26 and Peterson's minority government was sworn in on the same day.

== Opinion polls ==
=== During campaign period ===
Evolution of voting intentions at provincial level
| Polling firm | Last day of survey | Source | PCO | OLP | ONDP | Other | ME | Sample |
|---|---|---|---|---|---|---|---|---|
| Election 1985 | May 2, 1985 | | 37.9 | 37.1 | 23.6 | 1.4 | | |
| Environics | April 19, 1985 | | 41 | 33 | 26 | —N/a | —N/a | 1,015 |
| | April 1985 | | 43 | 35 | 21 | —N/a | —N/a | —N/a |
| | April 1985 | | 47 | 32 | 21 | —N/a | —N/a | —N/a |
Election called (March 25, 1985)

=== During the 32nd Parliament of Ontario ===
Evolution of voting intentions at provincial level
| Polling firm | Last day of survey | Source | PCO | OLP | ONDP | Other | ME | Sample |
|---|---|---|---|---|---|---|---|---|
| Gallup | March 1985 | | 50.5 | 28.8 | 20.3 | —N/a | —N/a | —N/a |
| Decima | February 1985 | | 55 | 21 | 21 | —N/a | —N/a | —N/a |
| CROP Inc | June 1984 | | 50 | —N/a | —N/a | —N/a | —N/a | —N/a |
| Gallup | June 1983 | | 51.9 | 30 | 17.6 | —N/a | 4 | 1,038 |
| Election 1981 | March 19, 1981 | | 44.38 | 33.48 | 21.14 | 1 | | |

== Results ==
Elections to the 33rd Parliament of Ontario (1985)
| Political party | Party leader | MPPs | | | | Votes | | | |
| Political party | Party leader | Candidates | 1981 | 1985 | ± | # | ± | % | ± (pp) |
|---|---|---|---|---|---|---|---|---|---|
| Progressive Conservative | Frank Miller | 125 | 70 | 52 | 18▼ | 1,343,044 | 69,444▼ | 36.94% | 7.44▼ |
| Liberal (Note: 1981 results include Liberal-Labour) | David Peterson | 125 | 34 | 48 | 14▲ | 1,377,965 | 305,285▲ | 37.90% | 4.20▲ |
| New Democratic | Bob Rae | 125 | 21 | 25 | 4▲ | 865,507 | 192,683▲ | 23.81% | 2.67▲ |
| Independent | | 28 | – | – | – | 25,728 | 15,143▲ | 0.71% | 0.38▲ |
| Libertarian | Scott Bell | 17 | – | – | – | 12,831 | 5,744▲ | 0.35% | 0.13▲ |
| Green | | 9 | – | – | – | 5,345 | 5,345▲ | 0.15% | New |
| Communist | Gordon Massie | 10 | – | – | – | 3,696 | 1,610▼ | 0.10% | 0.07▼ |
| Freedom (Note: previously known as the Unparty) | none (Note: Robert Metz was the President) | 3 | – | – | – | 1,583 | 1,123▲ | 0.04% | 0.03▲ |
| Total | | 442 | 125 | 125 | | 3,635,699 | | 100.00% | |
| Rejected ballots | | | | | | 26,434 | 5,637▲ | | |
| Voter turnout | | | | | | 3,662,133 | 458,852▲ | 61.55 | 3.51▲ |
| Registered electors | | | | | | 5,950,295 | 431,091▲ | | |

=== Vote and seat summaries ===
Ternary plots - shift of electoral support (1981-1985)
1981

1985
Electoral districts identified by colours of winning parties

Seats and popular vote by party
| Party | Seats | Votes | Change (pp) |
|---|---|---|---|
| █ Progressive Conservative | 52 / 125 | 36.94% | -7.44 |
| █ Liberal | 48 / 125 | 37.90% | 4.20 |
| █ New Democratic | 25 / 125 | 23.81% | 2.67 |
| █ Independent | 0 / 125 | 0.71% | 0.38 |
| █ Other | 0 / 125 | 0.64% | 0.19 |

=== Synopsis of results ===
Results by riding – 1985 Ontario general election
| Riding | Winning party | | | | | | Turnout (Note: including spoilt ballots) | Votes | | | | | |
| Name (Note: order is as given in EO reports) | 1981 | Party | Votes | Share | Margin # | Margin % | Turnout | Lib | PC | NDP | Ind | Other | Total |
|---|---|---|---|---|---|---|---|---|---|---|---|---|---|
| Algoma | NDP | NDP | 7,575 | 53.11% | 3,881 | 27.21% | 70.64% | 2,995 | 3,694 | 7,575 | – | – | 14,264 |
| Algoma—Manitoulin | PC | PC | 7,174 | 47.24% | 2,470 | 16.26% | 55.49% | 4,704 | 7,174 | 3,309 | – | – | 15,187 |
| Brampton | PC | Lib | 25,656 | 45.62% | 4,417 | 7.85% | 55.84% | 25,656 | 21,239 | 8,313 | 500 | 531 | 56,239 |
| Brantford | PC | PC | 13,444 | 41.65% | 1,141 | 3.53% | 64.87% | 6,533 | 13,444 | 12,303 | – | – | 32,280 |
| Brant—Oxford—Norfolk | Lib | Lib | 15,317 | 62.21% | 9,500 | 38.58% | 60.36% | 15,317 | 5,817 | 3,487 | – | – | 24,621 |
| Brock | PC | PC | 9,741 | 41.55% | 660 | 2.82% | 63.11% | 9,081 | 9,741 | 3,867 | – | 755 | 23,444 |
| Burlington South | PC | PC | 16,479 | 42.12% | 4,657 | 11.90% | 63.04% | 11,822 | 16,479 | 10,820 | – | – | 39,121 |
| Cambridge | PC | PC | 12,888 | 40.33% | 903 | 2.83% | 60.19% | 7,083 | 12,888 | 11,985 | – | – | 31,956 |
| Carleton | PC | PC | 17,732 | 44.34% | 2,639 | 6.60% | 57.85% | 15,093 | 17,732 | 7,165 | – | – | 39,990 |
| Carleton East | PC | Lib | 23,221 | 48.14% | 7,033 | 14.58% | 57.59% | 23,221 | 16,188 | 8,829 | – | – | 48,238 |
| Carleton-Grenville | PC | PC | 15,524 | 57.47% | 7,505 | 27.78% | 56.54% | 8,019 | 15,524 | 3,468 | – | – | 27,011 |
| Chatham—Kent | PC | Lib | 10,340 | 41.23% | 1,134 | 4.52% | 58.84% | 10,340 | 9,206 | 5,535 | – | – | 25,081 |
| Cochrane North | PC | Lib | 8,793 | 47.39% | 1,910 | 10.29% | 68.78% | 8,793 | 6,883 | 2,878 | – | – | 18,554 |
| Cochrane South | PC | PC | 13,935 | 59.05% | 8,273 | 35.06% | 62.63% | 4,002 | 13,935 | 5,662 | – | – | 23,599 |
| Cornwall | NDP | PC | 9,430 | 43.57% | 3,046 | 14.07% | 59.41% | 6,384 | 9,430 | 5,828 | – | – | 21,642 |
| Dufferin—Simcoe | PC | PC | 16,198 | 50.09% | 4,376 | 13.53% | 57.94% | 11,822 | 16,198 | 4,316 | – | – | 32,336 |
| Durham East | PC | PC | 15,193 | 46.59% | 5,361 | 16.44% | 58.14% | 7,584 | 15,193 | 9,832 | – | – | 32,609 |
| Durham West | PC | PC | 18,684 | 44.03% | 4,336 | 10.22% | 56.38% | 14,348 | 18,684 | 8,495 | – | 911 | 42,438 |
| Durham—York | PC | PC | 14,343 | 48.55% | 4,583 | 15.51% | 58.83% | 9,760 | 14,343 | 5,440 | – | – | 29,543 |
| Elgin | PC | PC | 11,816 | 45.29% | 3,197 | 12.25% | 62.09% | 8,619 | 11,816 | 5,315 | 342 | – | 26,092 |
| Erie | Lib | Lib | 10,926 | 54.57% | 5,022 | 25.08% | 60.91% | 10,926 | 5,904 | 3,191 | – | – | 20,021 |
| Essex North | Lib | NDP | 7,901 | 33.56% | 1,286 | 5.46% | 61.39% | 6,615 | 6,105 | 7,901 | 2,925 | – | 23,546 |
| Essex South | Lib | Lib | 11,382 | 47.22% | 6,284 | 26.07% | 61.08% | 11,382 | 5,098 | 2,677 | 4,947 | – | 24,104 |
| Fort William | PC | PC | 14,452 | 54.66% | 7,381 | 27.91% | 63.83% | 4,629 | 14,452 | 7,071 | – | 289 | 26,441 |
| Frontenac—Addington | Lib | Lib | 11,684 | 45.56% | 2,387 | 9.31% | 61.14% | 11,684 | 9,297 | 3,723 | 941 | – | 25,645 |
| Grey | Lib | Lib | 16,061 | 65.17% | 10,186 | 41.33% | 63.49% | 16,061 | 5,875 | 2,402 | – | 306 | 24,644 |
| Grey—Bruce | Lib | Lib | 14,883 | 59.97% | 7,288 | 29.37% | 65.85% | 14,883 | 7,595 | 2,340 | – | – | 24,818 |
| Haldimand—Norfolk | Lib | Lib | 17,456 | 56.06% | 7,593 | 24.38% | 66.48% | 17,456 | 9,863 | 3,821 | – | – | 31,140 |
| Halton—Burlington | Lib | Lib | 14,991 | 42.46% | 214 | 0.61% | 58.95% | 14,991 | 14,777 | 4,871 | 665 | – | 35,304 |
| Hamilton Centre | Lib | Lib | 9,184 | 44.01% | 384 | 1.84% | 56.85% | 9,184 | 2,883 | 8,800 | – | – | 20,867 |
| Hamilton East | NDP | NDP | 13,774 | 43.80% | 1,600 | 5.09% | 61.03% | 12,174 | 5,268 | 13,774 | – | 234 | 31,450 |
| Hamilton Mountain | NDP | NDP | 13,871 | 44.24% | 4,142 | 13.21% | 69.28% | 7,757 | 9,729 | 13,871 | – | – | 31,357 |
| Hamilton West | Lib | NDP | 10,182 | 37.42% | 450 | 1.65% | 61.95% | 9,732 | 6,705 | 10,182 | 593 | – | 27,212 |
| Hastings—Peterborough | PC | PC | 12,272 | 54.91% | 6,686 | 29.91% | 60.30% | 5,586 | 12,272 | 4,492 | – | – | 22,350 |
| Huron—Bruce | Lib | Lib | 17,159 | 61.94% | 8,609 | 31.08% | 71.72% | 17,159 | 8,550 | 1,992 | – | – | 27,701 |
| Huron—Middlesex | Lib | Lib | 13,820 | 61.21% | 6,439 | 28.52% | 70.71% | 13,820 | 7,381 | 1,148 | 229 | – | 22,578 |
| Kenora | PC | PC | 12,574 | 66.69% | 8,549 | 45.35% | 60.95% | 2,254 | 12,574 | 4,025 | – | – | 18,853 |
| Kent—Elgin | Lib | Lib | 11,616 | 54.36% | 3,778 | 17.68% | 62.81% | 11,616 | 7,838 | 1,916 | – | – | 21,370 |
| Kingston and the Islands | PC | Lib | 11,924 | 46.33% | 2,287 | 8.89% | 56.36% | 11,924 | 9,637 | 3,892 | – | 285 | 25,738 |
| Kitchener | Lib | Lib | 14,066 | 46.86% | 4,382 | 14.60% | 58.60% | 14,066 | 9,684 | 5,654 | 610 | – | 30,014 |
| Kitchener—Wilmot | Lib | Lib | 15,987 | 54.38% | 7,250 | 24.66% | 55.24% | 15,987 | 8,737 | 4,673 | – | – | 29,397 |
| Lake Nipigon | NDP | NDP | 5,708 | 41.70% | 1,176 | 8.59% | 64.45% | 3,448 | 4,532 | 5,708 | – | – | 13,688 |
| Lambton | PC | Lib | 10,816 | 47.52% | 860 | 3.78% | 67.64% | 10,816 | 9,956 | 1,987 | – | – | 22,759 |
| Lanark | PC | PC | 10,916 | 56.39% | 5,770 | 29.81% | 56.28% | 5,146 | 10,916 | 3,297 | – | – | 19,359 |
| Leeds | PC | PC | 11,809 | 51.61% | 5,061 | 22.12% | 58.76% | 6,748 | 11,809 | 3,583 | 741 | – | 22,881 |
| Lincoln | PC | PC | 12,226 | 49.84% | 3,222 | 13.13% | 67.82% | 9,004 | 12,226 | 2,264 | 1,036 | – | 24,530 |
| London Centre | Lib | Lib | 13,890 | 54.80% | 7,176 | 28.31% | 52.81% | 13,890 | 6,714 | 4,340 | – | 403 | 25,347 |
| London North | Lib | Lib | 20,536 | 54.43% | 9,103 | 24.13% | 60.14% | 20,536 | 11,433 | 5,191 | – | 566 | 37,726 |
| London South | PC | Lib | 24,522 | 51.03% | 6,683 | 13.91% | 62.91% | 24,522 | 17,839 | 5,080 | – | 614 | 48,055 |
| Middlesex | PC | Lib | 11,292 | 47.16% | 810 | 3.38% | 68.03% | 11,292 | 10,482 | 2,169 | – | – | 23,943 |
| Mississauga East | PC | PC | 14,900 | 37.96% | 2,566 | 6.54% | 57.52% | 12,334 | 14,900 | 12,015 | – | – | 39,249 |
| Mississauga North | PC | Lib | 21,369 | 41.69% | 1,424 | 2.78% | 54.54% | 21,369 | 19,945 | 9,943 | – | – | 51,257 |
| Mississauga South | PC | PC | 13,186 | 44.58% | 1,563 | 5.28% | 59.94% | 11,623 | 13,186 | 4,770 | – | – | 29,579 |
| Muskoka | PC | PC | 12,723 | 68.42% | 9,687 | 52.09% | 67.82% | 3,036 | 12,723 | 2,836 | – | – | 18,595 |
| Niagara Falls | Lib | Lib | 14,658 | 48.78% | 6,042 | 20.11% | 61.03% | 14,658 | 8,616 | 6,778 | – | – | 30,052 |
| Nickel Belt | NDP | NDP | 8,912 | 52.37% | 3,063 | 18.00% | 70.39% | 2,255 | 5,849 | 8,912 | – | – | 17,016 |
| Nipissing | PC | PC | 14,900 | 49.86% | 3,898 | 13.04% | 64.66% | 11,002 | 14,900 | 3,984 | – | – | 29,886 |
| Northumberland | PC | PC | 14,296 | 47.67% | 1,850 | 6.17% | 63.87% | 12,446 | 14,296 | 3,247 | – | – | 29,989 |
| Oakville | PC | PC | 14,265 | 41.66% | 687 | 2.01% | 64.06% | 13,578 | 14,265 | 4,390 | – | 2,008 | 34,241 |
| Oshawa | NDP | NDP | 12,686 | 50.25% | 5,158 | 20.43% | 54.71% | 5,034 | 7,528 | 12,686 | – | – | 25,248 |
| Ottawa Centre | NDP | NDP | 11,890 | 43.45% | 3,885 | 14.20% | 59.18% | 7,103 | 8,005 | 11,890 | 364 | – | 27,362 |
| Ottawa East | Lib | Lib | 14,601 | 68.40% | 10,630 | 49.80% | 49.15% | 14,601 | 2,257 | 3,971 | 518 | – | 21,347 |
| Ottawa South | PC | PC | 12,971 | 39.41% | 1,337 | 4.06% | 63.63% | 11,634 | 12,971 | 8,311 | – | – | 32,916 |
| Ottawa West | PC | PC | 15,089 | 46.63% | 2,948 | 9.11% | 59.43% | 12,141 | 15,089 | 4,427 | – | 701 | 32,358 |
| Oxford | PC | PC | 15,507 | 46.81% | 4,851 | 14.64% | 60.71% | 10,656 | 15,507 | 5,660 | 577 | 729 | 33,129 |
| Parry Sound | PC | PC | 10,904 | 50.53% | 1,360 | 6.30% | 69.58% | 9,544 | 10,904 | 1,130 | – | – | 21,578 |
| Perth | Lib | Lib | 20,040 | 69.31% | 13,964 | 48.30% | 62.24% | 20,040 | 6,076 | 2,796 | – | – | 28,912 |
| Peterborough | PC | PC | 16,878 | 43.03% | 4,937 | 12.59% | 60.25% | 9,734 | 16,878 | 11,941 | – | 673 | 39,226 |
| Port Arthur | NDP | NDP | 13,084 | 44.99% | 3,258 | 11.20% | 63.06% | 6,169 | 9,826 | 13,084 | – | – | 29,079 |
| Prescott and Russell | Lib | Lib | 18,833 | 57.95% | 7,795 | 23.99% | 60.34% | 18,833 | 11,038 | 2,625 | – | – | 32,496 |
| Prince Edward—Lennox | PC | PC | 10,170 | 52.44% | 3,252 | 16.77% | 57.55% | 6,918 | 10,170 | 2,307 | – | – | 19,395 |
| Quinte | Lib | Lib | 18,988 | 63.10% | 9,701 | 32.24% | 60.73% | 18,988 | 9,287 | 1,817 | – | – | 30,092 |
| Rainy River | LL | PC | 5,053 | 39.56% | 278 | 2.18% | 67.25% | 2,944 | 5,053 | 4,775 | – | – | 12,772 |
| Renfrew North | Lib | Lib | 12,849 | 66.45% | 7,101 | 36.72% | 63.60% | 12,849 | 5,748 | 740 | – | – | 19,337 |
| Renfrew South | PC | PC | 14,182 | 51.97% | 4,495 | 16.47% | 68.64% | 9,687 | 14,182 | 3,420 | – | – | 27,289 |
| St. Catharines | Lib | Lib | 20,605 | 57.94% | 11,576 | 32.55% | 61.65% | 20,605 | 9,029 | 5,624 | – | 305 | 35,563 |
| Sarnia | PC | PC | 18,651 | 61.25% | 11,213 | 36.82% | 59.99% | 7,438 | 18,651 | 3,572 | – | 792 | 30,453 |
| Sault Ste. Marie | PC | NDP | 16,362 | 44.85% | 1,069 | 2.93% | 64.49% | 4,830 | 15,293 | 16,362 | – | – | 36,485 |
| Simcoe Centre | PC | PC | 15,379 | 38.04% | 534 | 1.32% | 60.78% | 14,845 | 15,379 | 9,639 | 566 | – | 40,429 |
| Simcoe East | PC | PC | 13,371 | 41.86% | 2,369 | 7.42% | 63.52% | 7,566 | 13,371 | 11,002 | – | – | 31,939 |
| Stormont, Dundas and Glengarry | PC | PC | 13,119 | 60.03% | 6,083 | 27.83% | 61.94% | 7,036 | 13,119 | 1,700 | – | – | 21,855 |
| Sudbury | PC | PC | 12,591 | 48.61% | 5,581 | 21.55% | 60.65% | 6,302 | 12,591 | 7,010 | – | – | 25,903 |
| Sudbury East | NDP | NDP | 17,241 | 54.66% | 7,665 | 24.30% | 63.21% | 4,726 | 9,576 | 17,241 | – | – | 31,543 |
| Timiskaming | PC | NDP | 10,765 | 50.79% | 2,824 | 13.32% | 71.10% | 2,026 | 7,941 | 10,765 | 464 | – | 21,196 |
| Victoria—Haliburton | Lib | Lib | 15,340 | 50.93% | 3,770 | 12.52% | 67.09% | 15,340 | 11,570 | 3,209 | – | – | 30,119 |
| Waterloo North | Lib | Lib | 16,458 | 54.60% | 7,309 | 24.25% | 58.80% | 16,458 | 9,149 | 4,534 | – | – | 30,141 |
| Welland-Thorold | NDP | NDP | 17,065 | 59.44% | 11,038 | 38.45% | 66.73% | 6,027 | 5,618 | 17,065 | – | – | 28,710 |
| Wellington—Dufferin—Peel | PC | PC | 14,845 | 46.92% | 4,444 | 14.05% | 58.06% | 10,401 | 14,845 | 6,395 | – | – | 31,641 |
| Wellington South | Lib | Lib | 17,995 | 47.83% | 5,006 | 13.30% | 65.46% | 17,995 | 12,989 | 6,641 | – | – | 37,625 |
| Wentworth | PC | PC | 12,322 | 38.29% | 1,985 | 6.17% | 61.14% | 10,337 | 12,322 | 8,571 | 947 | – | 32,177 |
| Wentworth North | Lib | Lib | 18,328 | 47.73% | 5,168 | 13.46% | 65.33% | 18,328 | 13,160 | 6,158 | – | 751 | 38,397 |
| Windsor—Riverside | NDP | NDP | 17,883 | 61.62% | 11,164 | 38.47% | 57.28% | 4,418 | 6,719 | 17,883 | – | – | 29,020 |
| Windsor—Sandwich | Lib | Lib | 10,730 | 48.35% | 3,147 | 14.18% | 56.50% | 10,730 | 3,681 | 7,583 | – | 197 | 22,191 |
| Windsor—Walkerville | Lib | Lib | 9,130 | 40.03% | 2,150 | 9.43% | 58.56% | 9,130 | 6,980 | 6,698 | – | – | 22,808 |
| York Centre | PC | PC | 25,022 | 45.82% | 5,246 | 9.61% | 57.11% | 19,776 | 25,022 | 7,171 | 2,644 | – | 54,613 |
| York North | PC | Lib | 21,291 | 46.78% | 4,095 | 9.00% | 59.16% | 21,291 | 17,196 | 7,026 | – | – | 45,513 |
| Armourdale | PC | PC | 13,394 | 41.26% | 212 | 0.65% | 68.43% | 13,182 | 13,394 | 5,429 | – | 456 | 32,461 |
| Beaches—Woodbine | NDP | NDP | 12,672 | 49.82% | 5,371 | 21.12% | 65.11% | 5,065 | 7,301 | 12,672 | – | 396 | 25,434 |
| Bellwoods | NDP | NDP | 8,088 | 47.49% | 1,433 | 8.41% | 67.32% | 6,655 | 1,964 | 8,088 | 324 | – | 17,031 |
| Don Mills | PC | PC | 15,481 | 50.72% | 7,977 | 26.14% | 57.52% | 7,504 | 15,481 | 6,153 | 1,382 | – | 30,520 |
| Dovercourt | NDP | NDP | 6,677 | 38.96% | 77 | 0.45% | 67.75% | 6,600 | 3,564 | 6,677 | – | 298 | 17,139 |
| Downsview | NDP | Lib | 11,234 | 43.92% | 221 | 0.86% | 65.58% | 11,234 | 3,329 | 11,013 | – | – | 25,576 |
| Eglinton | PC | PC | 13,503 | 43.60% | 914 | 2.95% | 67.42% | 12,589 | 13,503 | 4,880 | – | – | 30,972 |
| Etobicoke | NDP | NDP | 16,792 | 54.33% | 9,219 | 29.83% | 58.77% | 6,544 | 7,573 | 16,792 | – | – | 30,909 |
| High Park—Swansea | PC | PC | 9,960 | 38.13% | 330 | 1.26% | 70.02% | 5,578 | 9,960 | 9,630 | 244 | 707 | 26,119 |
| Humber | PC | Lib | 18,057 | 45.92% | 1,951 | 4.96% | 66.85% | 18,057 | 16,106 | 5,160 | – | – | 39,323 |
| Lakeshore | PC | NDP | 11,539 | 39.89% | 2,037 | 7.04% | 67.93% | 9,502 | 7,886 | 11,539 | – | – | 28,927 |
| Oakwood | NDP | NDP | 10,407 | 41.63% | 776 | 3.10% | 68.62% | 9,631 | 4,636 | 10,407 | – | 327 | 25,001 |
| Oriole | PC | Lib | 17,641 | 49.05% | 4,084 | 11.36% | 65.23% | 17,641 | 13,557 | 3,660 | – | 1,106 | 35,964 |
| Parkdale | Lib | Lib | 12,065 | 62.67% | 6,929 | 35.99% | 66.69% | 12,065 | 2,052 | 5,136 | – | – | 19,253 |
| Riverdale | NDP | NDP | 9,869 | 52.16% | 5,279 | 27.90% | 61.69% | 3,949 | 4,590 | 9,869 | – | 514 | 18,922 |
| St. Andrew—St. Patrick | PC | PC | 10,332 | 40.47% | 1,959 | 7.67% | 63.95% | 6,330 | 10,332 | 8,373 | – | 496 | 25,531 |
| St. David | PC | Lib | 13,120 | 46.98% | 3,418 | 12.24% | 69.43% | 13,120 | 9,702 | 4,878 | – | 228 | 27,928 |
| St. George | PC | PC | 11,378 | 35.04% | 835 | 2.57% | 58.00% | 9,361 | 11,378 | 10,543 | 186 | 1,007 | 32,475 |
| Scarborough Centre | PC | PC | 8,890 | 35.56% | 359 | 1.44% | 57.77% | 8,531 | 8,890 | 7,577 | – | – | 24,998 |
| Scarborough East | PC | Lib | 15,855 | 48.22% | 4,610 | 14.02% | 58.27% | 15,855 | 11,245 | 4,381 | – | 1,402 | 32,883 |
| Scarborough—Ellesmere | PC | NDP | 10,119 | 37.42% | 219 | 0.81% | 63.63% | 6,674 | 9,900 | 10,119 | – | 348 | 27,041 |
| Scarborough North | PC | Lib | 30,504 | 47.52% | 7,860 | 12.24% | 57.68% | 30,504 | 22,644 | 9,072 | 1,974 | – | 64,194 |
| Scarborough West | NDP | NDP | 12,889 | 53.19% | 6,895 | 28.45% | 60.47% | 4,806 | 5,994 | 12,889 | 544 | – | 24,233 |
| Wilson Heights | PC | Lib | 12,363 | 40.76% | 2,188 | 7.21% | 64.26% | 12,363 | 10,175 | 7,793 | – | – | 30,331 |
| York East | PC | PC | 11,459 | 40.05% | 2,276 | 7.96% | 64.52% | 6,629 | 11,459 | 9,183 | – | 1,339 | 28,610 |
| York Mills | PC | PC | 17,943 | 48.19% | 7,865 | 21.12% | 61.12% | 10,078 | 17,943 | 6,872 | – | 2,339 | 37,232 |
| York South | NDP | NDP | 16,373 | 54.02% | 9,566 | 31.56% | 66.53% | 6,807 | 5,321 | 16,373 | 1,465 | 343 | 30,309 |
| York West | PC | PC | 14,595 | 39.98% | 715 | 1.96% | 65.00% | 13,880 | 14,595 | 6,930 | – | 1,099 | 36,504 |
| Yorkview | Lib | Lib | 15,986 | 49.84% | 3,328 | 10.38% | 60.72% | 15,986 | 3,431 | 12,658 | – | – | 32,075 |

= open seat
= turnout is above provincial average
= winning candidate was in previous Legislature
= not incumbent; was previously elected to the Legislature
= incumbent had switched allegiance
= incumbency arose from byelection gain
= previously incumbent in another riding
= other incumbents renominated
= previously an MP in the House of Commons of Canada
= multiple candidates

=== Comparative analysis for ridings (1985 vs 1981) ===
Summary of riding results by turnout, vote share for winning candidate, and swing (vs 1981) (Note: Summarized from "Data Explorer". Elections Ontario.)
| Riding and winning party | | | Turnout | | Vote share | | Swing (Note: Positive indicates improvement to standing of party winning in 1981; negative points to 1981's second-place party being swung to.) |
| Riding and winning party | | | % | Change (pp) | % | Change (pp) | Change (pp) |
|---|---|---|---|---|---|---|---|
| Algoma | NDP | Hold | 70.64 | 1.41 | 53.11 | 0.28 | 4.95 |
| Algoma—Manitoulin | PC | Hold | 55.49 | 5.33 | 47.24 | -10.12 | -8.59 |
| Brampton | Lib | Gain | 55.84 | 5.12 | 45.62 | 22.60 | -23.03 |
| Brantford | PC | Hold | 64.87 | 5.44 | 41.65 | -3.70 | -3.98 |
| Brant—Oxford—Norfolk | Lib | Hold | 60.36 | 4.72 | 62.21 | 2.82 | 3.31 |
| Brock | PC | Hold | 63.11 | 2.75 | 41.55 | -7.20 | -7.06 |
| Burlington South | PC | Hold | 63.04 | 7.35 | 42.12 | -15.68 | -9.36 |
| Cambridge | PC | Hold | 60.19 | 0.86 | 40.33 | -2.49 | -0.03 |
| Carleton | PC | Hold | 57.85 | 4.63 | 44.34 | -10.92 | -10.98 |
| Carleton East | Lib | Gain | 57.59 | -1.78 | 48.14 | 14.19 | -9.33 |
| Carleton-Grenville | PC | Hold | 56.54 | -1.17 | 57.47 | -7.61 | -6.31 |
| Chatham—Kent | Lib | Gain | 58.84 | 4.37 | 41.23 | 12.42 | 0.72 |
| Cochrane North | Lib | Gain | 68.78 | 6.22 | 47.39 | 12.36 | -5.72 |
| Cochrane South | PC | Hold | 62.63 | 0.98 | 59.05 | 2.80 | 8.56 |
| Cornwall | PC | Gain | 59.41 | -4.25 | 43.57 | 9.04 | -12.00 |
| Dufferin—Simcoe | PC | Hold | 57.94 | 1.53 | 50.09 | -12.74 | -13.02 |
| Durham East | PC | Hold | 58.14 | -2.32 | 46.59 | -1.43 | -1.85 |
| Durham West | PC | Hold | 56.38 | 0.93 | 44.03 | -8.75 | -9.74 |
| Durham—York | PC | Hold | 58.83 | 1.84 | 48.55 | -8.96 | -8.36 |
| Elgin | PC | Hold | 62.09 | 3.31 | 45.29 | -10.13 | -6.15 |
| Erie | Lib | Hold | 60.91 | 6.32 | 54.57 | 4.75 | 2.56 |
| Essex North | NDP | Gain | 61.39 | 6.92 | 33.56 | 3.87 | -10.96 |
| Essex South | Lib | Hold | 61.08 | 9.90 | 47.22 | -5.55 | -0.71 |
| Fort William | PC | Hold | 63.83 | 4.18 | 54.66 | 0.34 | 2.60 |
| Frontenac—Addington | Lib | Hold | 61.14 | -1.76 | 45.56 | 1.35 | 3.94 |
| Grey | Lib | Hold | 63.49 | -1.27 | 65.17 | 9.71 | 11.22 |
| Grey—Bruce | Lib | Hold | 65.85 | 1.49 | 59.97 | -0.33 | 1.25 |
| Haldimand—Norfolk | Lib | Hold | 66.48 | 3.39 | 56.06 | -0.43 | -0.80 |
| Halton—Burlington | Lib | Hold | 58.95 | 2.63 | 42.46 | -2.53 | -0.57 |
| Hamilton Centre | Lib | Hold | 56.85 | 1.26 | 44.01 | -3.01 | -5.85 |
| Hamilton East | NDP | Hold | 61.03 | 6.01 | 43.80 | -2.67 | -5.47 |
| Hamilton Mountain | NDP | Hold | 69.28 | 2.26 | 44.24 | 8.47 | 6.28 |
| Hamilton West | NDP | Gain | 61.95 | 1.49 | 37.42 | 21.31 | 1.17 |
| Hastings—Peterborough | PC | Hold | 60.30 | -6.19 | 54.91 | 5.30 | 8.96 |
| Huron—Bruce | Lib | Hold | 71.72 | 1.50 | 61.94 | 15.31 | 15.11 |
| Huron—Middlesex | Lib | Hold | 70.71 | 4.14 | 61.21 | 8.97 | 9.16 |
| Kenora | PC | Hold | 60.95 | 3.01 | 66.69 | 5.86 | 4.43 |
| Kent—Elgin | Lib | Hold | 62.81 | -1.59 | 54.36 | 7.28 | 8.06 |
| Kingston and the Islands | Lib | Gain | 56.36 | -1.74 | 46.33 | 12.26 | -12.54 |
| Kitchener | Lib | Hold | 58.60 | 7.74 | 46.86 | -4.11 | -2.03 |
| Kitchener—Wilmot | Lib | Hold | 55.24 | 5.75 | 54.38 | 5.83 | 6.00 |
| Lake Nipigon | NDP | Hold | 64.45 | 8.70 | 41.70 | -27.20 | -22.13 |
| Lambton | Lib | Gain | 67.64 | 1.61 | 47.52 | 17.14 | -18.49 |
| Lanark | PC | Hold | 56.28 | 0.48 | 56.39 | -5.30 | -4.59 |
| Leeds | PC | Hold | 58.76 | 0.22 | 51.61 | -12.80 | -10.25 |
| Lincoln | PC | Hold | 67.82 | 2.28 | 49.84 | 3.56 | 5.66 |
| London Centre | Lib | Hold | 52.81 | 3.15 | 54.80 | 3.13 | 5.79 |
| London North | Lib | Hold | 60.14 | 5.98 | 54.43 | 4.83 | 6.25 |
| London South | Lib | Gain | 62.91 | 10.88 | 51.03 | 20.17 | -18.89 |
| Middlesex | Lib | Gain | 68.03 | 2.02 | 47.16 | 9.75 | -9.41 |
| Mississauga East | PC | Hold | 57.52 | 7.30 | 37.96 | -17.71 | -10.94 |
| Mississauga North | Lib | Gain | 54.54 | 5.09 | 41.69 | 16.42 | -16.89 |
| Mississauga South | PC | Hold | 59.94 | 4.35 | 44.58 | -11.05 | -11.09 |
| Muskoka | PC | Hold | 67.82 | 3.39 | 68.42 | 13.34 | 11.16 |
| Niagara Falls | Lib | Hold | 61.03 | 4.72 | 48.78 | 1.54 | 4.00 |
| Nickel Belt | NDP | Hold | 70.39 | 7.00 | 52.37 | -2.48 | 8.49 |
| Nipissing | PC | Hold | 64.66 | 0.56 | 49.86 | -5.58 | -2.03 |
| Northumberland | PC | Hold | 63.87 | -1.16 | 47.67 | -3.91 | -3.24 |
| Oakville | PC | Hold | 64.06 | 7.48 | 41.66 | -20.77 | -16.32 |
| Oshawa | NDP | Hold | 54.71 | 5.02 | 50.25 | 2.20 | 4.46 |
| Ottawa Centre | NDP | Hold | 59.18 | 4.60 | 43.45 | 6.68 | 5.92 |
| Ottawa East | Lib | Hold | 49.15 | 0.12 | 68.40 | -0.82 | 4.62 |
| Ottawa South | PC | Hold | 63.63 | 3.41 | 39.41 | -10.56 | -8.45 |
| Ottawa West | PC | Hold | 59.43 | 3.56 | 46.63 | -12.67 | -9.58 |
| Oxford | PC | Hold | 60.71 | -0.86 | 46.81 | -3.06 | 0.94 |
| Parry Sound | PC | Hold | 69.58 | 2.71 | 50.53 | 4.26 | 3.14 |
| Perth | Lib | Hold | 62.24 | 3.36 | 69.31 | 6.80 | 8.02 |
| Peterborough | PC | Hold | 60.25 | -2.81 | 43.03 | -2.90 | 0.54 |
| Port Arthur | NDP | Hold | 63.06 | 1.84 | 44.99 | -1.10 | 2.94 |
| Prescott and Russell | Lib | Hold | 60.34 | -0.49 | 57.95 | 1.74 | 2.38 |
| Prince Edward—Lennox | PC | Hold | 57.55 | -3.64 | 52.44 | -5.09 | -2.82 |
| Quinte | Lib | Hold | 60.73 | 4.65 | 63.10 | 6.32 | 5.91 |
| Rainy River | PC | Gain | 67.25 | 5.75 | 39.56 | 2.39 | -10.16 |
| Renfrew North | Lib | Hold | 63.60 | 5.41 | 66.45 | 13.88 | 12.66 |
| Renfrew South | PC | Hold | 68.64 | -2.45 | 51.97 | -3.69 | 0.33 |
| St. Catharines | Lib | Hold | 61.65 | 4.44 | 57.94 | 6.09 | 6.48 |
| Sarnia | PC | Hold | 59.99 | -3.28 | 61.25 | 15.02 | 13.36 |
| Sault Ste. Marie | NDP | Gain | 64.49 | 10.20 | 44.85 | 20.51 | 2.18 |
| Simcoe Centre | PC | Hold | 60.78 | 1.72 | 38.04 | -11.80 | -5.85 |
| Simcoe East | PC | Hold | 63.52 | -0.87 | 41.86 | -0.26 | -2.03 |
| Stormont, Dundas and Glengarry | PC | Hold | 61.94 | -4.01 | 60.03 | 4.65 | 4.31 |
| Sudbury | PC | Hold | 60.65 | -2.08 | 48.61 | 2.66 | 3.16 |
| Sudbury East | NDP | Hold | 63.21 | 4.27 | 54.66 | 5.45 | 4.24 |
| Timiskaming | NDP | Gain | 71.10 | 6.07 | 50.79 | 14.67 | -10.96 |
| Victoria—Haliburton | Lib | Hold | 67.09 | 4.18 | 50.93 | 1.22 | 1.80 |
| Waterloo North | Lib | Hold | 58.80 | 6.50 | 54.60 | 5.44 | 5.93 |
| Welland-Thorold | NDP | Hold | 66.73 | 1.94 | 59.44 | 9.63 | 9.05 |
| Wellington—Dufferin—Peel | PC | Hold | 58.06 | -0.45 | 46.92 | -9.64 | -7.43 |
| Wellington South | Lib | Hold | 65.46 | 8.61 | 47.83 | -5.74 | -7.07 |
| Wentworth | PC | Hold | 61.14 | -1.19 | 38.29 | 3.41 | 5.55 |
| Wentworth North | Lib | Hold | 65.33 | 1.34 | 47.73 | -1.40 | 0.57 |
| Windsor—Riverside | NDP | Hold | 57.28 | 0.97 | 61.62 | 12.04 | 14.97 |
| Windsor—Sandwich | Lib | Hold | 56.50 | 8.16 | 48.35 | 8.09 | 6.73 |
| Windsor—Walkerville | Lib | Hold | 58.56 | 7.27 | 40.03 | -14.86 | -9.14 |
| York Centre | PC | Hold | 57.11 | 0.30 | 45.82 | -1.72 | 2.66 |
| York North | Lib | Gain | 59.16 | 4.95 | 46.78 | 16.04 | -16.82 |
| Armourdale | PC | Hold | 68.43 | 7.79 | 41.26 | -13.37 | -11.57 |
| Beaches—Woodbine | NDP | Hold | 65.11 | 5.87 | 49.82 | 6.72 | 9.83 |
| Bellwoods | NDP | Hold | 67.32 | 8.57 | 47.49 | 6.50 | 2.74 |
| Don Mills | PC | Hold | 57.52 | 4.98 | 50.72 | -13.27 | -9.12 |
| Dovercourt | NDP | Hold | 67.75 | 5.13 | 38.96 | 1.15 | -0.79 |
| Downsview | Lib | Gain | 65.58 | 7.04 | 43.92 | 7.78 | -1.91 |
| Eglinton | PC | Hold | 67.42 | 9.56 | 43.60 | -21.32 | -20.52 |
| Etobicoke | NDP | Hold | 58.77 | 3.46 | 54.33 | 13.69 | 10.31 |
| High Park—Swansea | PC | Hold | 70.02 | 5.39 | 38.13 | -8.87 | -4.86 |
| Humber | Lib | Gain | 66.85 | 6.92 | 45.92 | 16.74 | -18.11 |
| Lakeshore | NDP | Gain | 67.93 | 6.87 | 39.89 | 3.97 | -8.67 |
| Oakwood | NDP | Hold | 68.62 | 12.39 | 41.63 | -3.55 | 4.15 |
| Oriole | Lib | Gain | 65.23 | 7.58 | 49.05 | 12.85 | -12.42 |
| Parkdale | Lib | Hold | 66.69 | 8.10 | 62.67 | 20.40 | 15.19 |
| Riverdale | NDP | Hold | 61.69 | 12.07 | 52.16 | 5.42 | 4.69 |
| St. Andrew—St. Patrick | PC | Hold | 63.95 | 6.86 | 40.47 | -8.63 | -0.98 |
| St. David | Lib | Gain | 69.43 | 4.63 | 46.98 | 11.80 | -8.21 |
| St. George | PC | Hold | 58.00 | -0.69 | 35.04 | -7.96 | -4.27 |
| Scarborough Centre | PC | Hold | 57.77 | 4.71 | 35.56 | -20.35 | -14.63 |
| Scarborough East | Lib | Gain | 58.27 | 2.80 | 48.22 | 23.25 | -22.54 |
| Scarborough—Ellesmere | NDP | Gain | 63.63 | 3.36 | 37.42 | -0.15 | -4.05 |
| Scarborough North | Lib | Gain | 57.68 | 4.60 | 47.52 | 21.75 | -23.72 |
| Scarborough West | NDP | Hold | 60.47 | 1.30 | 53.19 | 11.35 | 13.44 |
| Wilson Heights | Lib | Gain | 64.26 | 12.43 | 40.76 | 4.32 | -9.66 |
| York East | PC | Hold | 64.52 | 7.39 | 40.05 | -17.29 | -14.98 |
| York Mills | PC | Hold | 61.12 | 7.51 | 48.19 | -17.40 | -13.22 |
| York South | NDP | Hold | 66.53 | 6.78 | 54.02 | 17.01 | 13.02 |
| York West | PC | Hold | 65.00 | 6.78 | 39.98 | -17.60 | -11.89 |
| Yorkview | Lib | Hold | 60.72 | 5.69 | 49.84 | 11.22 | 2.93 |

=== Analysis ===
Party candidates in 2nd place
| Party in 1st place | Party in 2nd place | | | Total |
| Party in 1st place | PC | Lib | NDP | Total |
|---|---|---|---|---|
| Progressive Conservative | | 38 | 14 | 52 |
| Liberal | 42 | | 6 | 48 |
| New Democratic | 16 | 9 | | 25 |
| Total | 58 | 47 | 20 | 125 |

Candidates ranked 1st to 5th place, by party
| Parties | 1st | 2nd | 3rd | 4th | 5th |
|---|---|---|---|---|---|
| █ Progressive Conservative | 52 | 58 | 15 | | |
| █ Liberal | 48 | 47 | 30 | | |
| █ New Democratic | 25 | 20 | 79 | 1 | |
| █ Independent | | | 1 | 20 | 7 |
| █ Libertarian | | | | 15 | 1 |
| █ Communist | | | | 10 | |
| █ Green | | | | 5 | 3 |
| █ Freedom | | | | 3 | |

Resulting composition of the 28th Legislative Assembly
| Source | | Party | | | |
|---|---|---|---|---|---|
| Source | | PC | Lib | NDP | Total |
| Seats retained | Incumbents returned | 43 | 24 | 16 | 83 |
| Seats retained | Open seats held | 7 | 5 | 3 | 15 |
| Seats retained | Byelection loss reversed | | 1 | | 1 |
| Seats retained | Ouster of incumbent changing allegiance | | 1 | | 1 |
| Seats changing hands | Incumbents defeated | | 12 | 4 | 16 |
| Seats changing hands | Open seats gained | 2 | 5 | 1 | 8 |
| Seats changing hands | Byelection gain held | | | 1 | 1 |
| Total | | 52 | 48 | 25 | 125 |

=== Significant results among independent and minor party candidates ===
Those candidates not belonging to a major party, receiving more than 1,000 votes in the election, are listed below:

| Riding | Party | Candidates | Votes | Placed |
|---|---|---|---|---|
| Don Mills | █ Independent | Gary Watson | 1,382 | 4th |
| Essex North | █ Independent | Raymond Boggs | 2,925 | 4th |
| Essex South | █ Independent | Jeffrey Totten | 4,947 | 3rd |
| Lincoln | █ Independent | Kenneth Lee | 1,036 | 4th |
| Oakville | █ Green | Christopher Kowalchuk | 2,008 | 4th |
| Oriole | █ Libertarian | George Graham | 1,106 | 4th |
| St. George | █ Libertarian | Michael Beech | 1,007 | 4th |
| Scarborough East | █ Libertarian | James McIntosh | 1,402 | 4th |
| Scarborough North | █ Independent | Ronald Austin | 1,974 | 4th |
| York Centre | █ Independent | Stewart Cole | 2,644 | 4th |
| York Mills | █ Libertarian | Scott Bell | 2,339 | 4th |
| York South | █ Independent | William Schulze | 1,063 | 4th |
| York West | █ Libertarian | Robert Dunk | 1,099 | 4th |

=== Seats changing hands ===
Twenty-five seats changed allegiance in this election:

PC to Liberal

- Brampton
- Carleton East
- Chatham—Kent
- Cochrane North
- Humber
- Kingston and the Islands
- Lambton
- London South
- Middlesex
- Mississauga North
- Oriole
- St. David
- Scarborough East
- Scarborough North
- Wilson Heights
- York North

PC to NDP

- Lakeshore
- Sault Ste. Marie
- Scarborough—Ellesmere
- Timiskaming

Liberal to NDP

- Essex North
- Hamilton West

Liberal-Labour to PC

- Rainy River

NDP to Liberal

- Downsview

NDP to PC

- Cornwall

=== MPPs elected by region and riding ===
Party designations are as follows:

PC
Liberal
NDP

Northern Ontario

- Algoma: Bud Wildman
- Algoma—Manitoulin : John Lane
- Cochrane North: René Fontaine
- Cochrane South: Alan Pope
- Fort William: Mickey Hennessy
- Kenora: Leo Bernier
- Lake Nipigon: Gilles Pouliot
- Nickel Belt: Floyd Laughren
- Nipissing: Mike Harris
- Port Arthur: Jim Foulds
- Rainy River: Jack Pierce
- Sault Ste. Marie: Karl Morin-Strom
- Sudbury: Jim Gordon
- Sudbury East: Elie Martel
- Timiskaming: David Ramsay

Ottawa Valley

- Carleton: Robert C. Mitchell
- Carleton East: Gilles Morin
- Lanark: Douglas Wiseman
- Ottawa Centre: Evelyn Gigantes
- Ottawa East: Bernard Grandmaître
- Ottawa South: Claude Bennett
- Ottawa West: Reuben Baetz
- Prescott and Russell: Jean Poirier
- Renfrew North: Sean Conway
- Renfrew South: Paul Yakabuski

Saint Lawrence Valley

- Carleton—Grenville: Norm Sterling
- Cornwall: Luc Guindon
- Kingston and the Islands: Ken Keyes
- Leeds: Bob Runciman
- Stormont—Dundas—Glengarry: Noble Villeneuve

Central Ontario

- Frontenac—Addington: Larry South
- Hastings-Peterborough: Jim Pollock
- Northumberland: Howard Sheppard
- Peterborough: John Turner
- Prince Edward—Lennox: James A. Taylor
- Quinte: Hugh O'Neil
- Victoria—Haliburton: John Eakins

Georgian Bay

- Grey-Bruce: Eddie Sargent
- Muskoka: Frank Miller
- Parry Sound: Ernie Eves
- Simcoe Centre: Earl W. Rowe
- Simcoe East: Al McLean

Hamilton/Halton/Niagara

- Brock: Peter Partington
- Burlington South: Cam Jackson
- Erie: Ray Haggerty
- Halton—Burlington: Don Knight
- Hamilton Centre: Lily Oddie Munro
- Hamilton East: Robert W. Mackenzie
- Hamilton Mountain: Brian Charlton
- Hamilton West: Richard Allen
- Lincoln: Philip Andrewes
- Niagara Falls: Vince Kerrio
- Oakville: Terry O'Connor
- St. Catharines: Jim Bradley
- Welland-Thorold: Mel Swart
- Wentworth: Gordon Howlett Dean
- Wentworth North: Chris Ward

Midwestern Ontario

- Brantford: Phil Gillies
- Brant—Oxford—Norfolk: Robert Nixon
- Cambridge: Bill Barlow
- Dufferin—Simcoe: George McCague
- Grey: Bob McKessock
- Haldimand-Norfolk: Gordon Miller
- Huron–Bruce: Murray Elston
- Kitchener: David R. Cooke
- Kitchener—Wilmot: John Sweeney
- Oxford: Dick Treleaven
- Perth: Hugh Edighoffer
- Waterloo North: Herb Epp
- Wellington South: Rick Ferraro
- Wellington—Dufferin—Peel: Jack Johnson

Southwestern Ontario

- Chatham—Kent: Maurice Bossy
- Elgin: Ron McNeil
- Essex North: Patrick Michael Hayes
- Essex South: Remo Mancini
- Huron–Middlesex: Jack Riddell
- Kent—Elgin: Jim McGuigan
- Lambton: David William Smith
- London Centre: David Peterson
- London North: Ron Van Horne
- London South: Elizabeth Joan Smith
- Middlesex: Doug Reycraft
- Sarnia: Andy Brandt
- Windsor—Riverside: Dave Cooke
- Windsor—Sandwich: Bill Wrye
- Windsor—Walkerville: Bernard Newman

Peel/York/Durham

- Brampton: Bob Callahan
- Durham East: Sam Cureatz
- Durham West: George Ashe
- Durham—York: K. Ross Stevenson
- Mississauga East: Bud Gregory
- Mississauga North: Steven Offer
- Mississauga South: Margaret Marland
- Oshawa: Michael Breaugh
- York Centre: W. Donald Cousens
- York North: Greg Sorbara

Metropolitan Toronto

- Armourdale: Bruce McCaffrey
- Beaches—Woodbine: Marion Bryden
- Bellwoods: Ross McClellan
- Don Mills: Dennis Timbrell
- Dovercourt: Tony Lupusella
- Downsview: Joseph Cordiano
- Eglinton: David James McFadden
- Etobicoke: Ed Philip
- High Park—Swansea: Yuri Shymko
- Humber: Jim Henderson
- Lakeshore: Ruth Grier
- Oakwood: Tony Grande
- Oriole: Elinor Caplan
- Parkdale: Tony Ruprecht
- Riverdale: David Reville
- St. Andrew—St. Patrick: Larry Grossman
- St. David: Ian Scott
- St. George: Susan Fish
- Scarborough Centre: William C. Davis
- Scarborough East: Ed Fulton
- Scarborough North: Alvin Curling
- Scarborough West: Richard Johnston
- Scarborough—Ellesmere: David William Warner
- Wilson Heights: Monte Kwinter
- York East: Robert Elgie
- York Mills: Bette Stephenson
- York South: Bob Rae
- York West: Nick Leluk
- Yorkview: Claudio Polsinelli

== Riding results ==
Algoma:

- (incumbent) Bud Wildman (NDP) 7575
- Jim Thibert (PC) 3694
- Bryan McDougall (L) 2995

Algoma—Manitoulin:

- (incumbent) John Lane (PC) 7174
- Tom Farquhar (L) 4704
- Len Hembruf (NDP) 3309

Armourdale:

- (incumbent) Bruce McCaffrey (PC) 13394
- Gino Matrundola (L) 13182
- Bob Hebdon (NDP) 5429
- Simon Srdarev (Lbt) 456

Beaches—Woodbine:

- (incumbent) Marion Bryden (NDP) 12672
- Paul Christie (PC) 7301
- Sally Kelly (L) 5065
- Steve Thistle (Lbt) 396

Bellwoods:

- (incumbent) Ross McClellan (NDP) 8088
- Walter Bardyn (L) 6655
- Bento de Sao Jose (PC) 1964
- Ronald Rodgers 324

Brampton:

- Bob Callahan (L) 25656
- Jeff Rice (PC) 21239
- Terry Gorman (NDP) 8313
- Jim Bridgewood (Comm) 531
- Dave Duqette 500

Brantford:

- (incumbent) Phil Gillies (PC) 13444
- Jack Tubman (NDP) 12303
- Herb German (L) 6533

Brant-Oxford-Norfolk:

- (incumbent) Robert Nixon (L) 15317
- Ian Birnie (PC) 5817
- Irene Heltner (NDP) 3487

Brock:

- Peter Partington (PC) 9741
- Bill Andres (L) 9081
- Robert Woolston (NDP) 3867
- Brian Dolby (G) 755

Burlington South:

- Cam Jackson (PC) 16479
- Doug Redfearn (L) 11822
- Walter Mukewich (NDP) 10820

Cambridge:

- (incumbent) Bill Barlow (PC) 12888
- Alec Dufresne (NDP) 11985
- Bob Jeffrey (L) 7083

Carleton:

- (incumbent) Bob Mitchell (PC) 17732
- Hans Daigeler (L) 15093
- Bea Murray (NDP) 7165

Carleton East:

- Gilles Morin (L) 23221
- (incumbent) Bob MacQuarrie (PC) 16188
- Joan Gullen (NDP) 8829

Carleton-Grenville:

- (incumbent) Norm Sterling (PC) 15524
- Dan Maxwell (L) 8019
- Alan White (NDP) 3468

Chatham—Kent:

- Maurice Bossy (L) 10340
- (incumbent) Andy Watson (PC) 9206
- Ron Franko (NDP) 5535

Cochrane North:

- René Fontaine (L) 8793
- (incumbent) René Piché (PC) 6883
- Andre Philippe (NDP) 2878

Cochrane South:

- (incumbent) Alan Pope (PC) 13935
- Roger Loiselle (NDP) 5662
- Jim Martin (L) 4002

Cornwall:

- Luc Guindon (PC) 9430
- Claude Poirier (L) 6384
- Steve Corrie (NDP) 5828

Don Mills:

- (incumbent) Dennis Timbrell (PC) 15481
- John Atkin (L) 7504
- Michael Wyatt (NDP) 6153
- Gary Watson (Ind [RWL]) 1382

Dovercourt:

- (incumbent) Tony Lupusella (NDP) 6677
- Gil Gillespie (L) 6600
- Joe Palozzi (PC) 3564
- Gordon Massie (Comm) 298

Downsview:

- Joseph Cordiano (L) 11234
- (incumbent) Odoardo Di Santo (NDP) 11013
- Vincent Stabile (PC) 3329

Dufferin—Simcoe:

- (incumbent) George McCague (PC) 16198
- Gary Johnson (L) 11822
- Jeff Koechlin (NDP) 4316

Durham East:

- (incumbent) Sam Cureatz (PC) 15193
- Doug Smith (NDP) 9832
- Steve Ryan (L) 7584

Durham West:

- (incumbent) George Ashe (PC) 18684
- Brian Evans (L) 14348
- Don Stewart (NDP) 8495
- Eugene Gmitrowicz (Lbt) 911

Durham—York:

- (incumbent) Ross Stevenson (PC) 14343
- Don Hadden (L) 9760
- Margaret Wilbur (NDP) 5440

Eglinton:

- David McFadden (PC) 13503
- Dianne Poole (L) 12589
- John Goodfellow (NDP) 4880

Elgin:

- (incumbent) Ron McNeil (PC) 11816
- Peter Charlton (L) 8619
- Gord Campbell (NDP) 5315

Erie:

- (incumbent) Ray Haggerty (L) 10926
- Stan Pettit (PC) 5904
- Shirley Summers (NDP) 3191

Essex North:

- Pat Hayes (NDP) 7901
- Jack Morris (L) 6615
- Jack Menard (PC) 6105
- Ray Boggs 2925

Essex South:

- (incumbent) Remo Mancini (L) 11382
- Paul Setterington (PC) 5098
- Jeff Totten 4947
- Paul Hertel (NDP) 267

Etobicoke:

- (incumbent) Ed Philip (NDP) 16792
- John Smith (PC) 7573
- John Genser (L) 6544

Fort William:

- (incumbent) Mickey Hennessy (PC) 14452
- Don Smith (NDP) 7071
- Norris Badanai (L) 4629
- John MacLennan (Comm) 289

Frontenac—Addington:

- Larry South (L) 11684
- (incumbent) J. Earl McEwen (PC) 9297
- Lars Thompson (NDP) 3723
- Ross Baker 941

Grey:

- (incumbent) Bob McKessock (L) 16061
- Case Vanderham (PC) 5875
- Rhonda Green (NDP) 2402
- Eric Biggins (Lbt) 306

Grey—Bruce:

- (incumbent) Eddie Sargent (L) 14883
- Arlene Wright (PC) 7595
- Joanne Shaw (NDP) 2340

Haldimand—Norfolk:

- (incumbent) Gordon Miller (L) 17456
- Barbara Martindale (PC) 9863
- Wayne Pierce (NDP) 3821

Halton—Burlington:

- Don Knight (L) 14991
- Peter Pomeroy (PC) 14777
- Doug Hamilton (NDP) 4871
- Neil Sivertson 665

Hamilton Centre:

- Lily Oddie Munro (L) 9184
- (incumbent) Mike Davison (NDP) 8800
- John Ankers (PC) 2883

Hamilton East:

- (incumbent) Robert W. Mackenzie (NDP) 13774
- Shirley Collins (L) 12174
- Fred Lombardo (PC) 5268
- Kerry Wilson (Comm) 234

Hamilton Mountain:

- (incumbent) Brian Charlton (NDP) 13871
- Steve Oneschuk (PC) 9729
- Dominic Agostino (L) 7757

Hamilton West:

- (incumbent) Richard Allen (NDP) 10182
- Paul Hanover (L) 9732
- Anne Jones (PC) 6705
- Ron Crawford 496
- Val Hache 97

Hastings—Peterborough:

- (incumbent) Jim Pollock (PC) 12272
- Paul Ockenden (L) 5586
- Elmer Buchanan (NDP) 4492

High Park—Swansea:

- (incumbent) Yuri Shymko (PC) 9960
- Elaine Ziemba (NDP) 9630
- John Rudnicki (L) 5578
- Bob Cumming (Lbt) 498
- Robert Seajkowski 244
- Andrew Scorer (G) 209

Humber:

- Jim Henderson (L) 18057
- (incumbent) Morley Kells (PC) 16106
- Peter Sutherland (NDP) 5160

Huron—Bruce:

- (incumbent) Murray Elston (L) 17159
- Mike Snobelen (PC) 8550
- Norma Peterson (NDP) 1992

Huron—Middlesex:

- (incumbent) Jack Riddell (L) 13820
- Bryan Smith (PC) 7381
- Paul Klopp (NDP) 1148
- Carmen Dawson 229

Kenora:

- (incumbent) Leo Bernier (PC) 12574
- Colin Wasacase (NDP) 4025
- Mark Ducharme (L) 2254

Kent—Elgin:

- (incumbent) Jim McGuigan (L) 11616
- Shirley McHardy (PC) 7838
- Donald Alexander (NDP) 1916

Kingston and the Islands:

- Ken Keyes (L) 11924
- (incumbent) Keith Norton (PC) 9637
- Pamela Cross (NDP) 3892
- Don Irvine (G) 285

Kitchener:

- David Cooke (L) 14066
- Don Travers (PC) 9684
- Tim Little (NDP) 5654
- Ed Halbach (Ind [Humanist]) 453
- Albert Norris 157

Kitchener—Wilmot:

- (incumbent) John Sweeney (L) 15987
- Jim Ziegler (PC) 8737
- Mike Cooper (NDP) 4673

Lake Nipigon:

- Gilles Pouliot (NDP) 5708
- Jim Files (PC) 4532
- Michael Power (L) 3448

Lambton:

- David William Smith (L) 10816
- Bob Boyd (PC) 9956
- Grant Reynolds (NDP) 1987

Lanark—Renfrew:

- (incumbent) Douglas Wiseman (PC) 10916
- John Carley (L) 5146
- Don Page (NDP) 3297

Lakeshore:

- Ruth Grier (NDP) 11539
- Frank Sgarlata (L) 9502
- (incumbent) Al Kolyn (PC) 7886

Leeds:

- (incumbent) Robert Runciman (PC) 11809
- Dolores Wing (L) 6748
- Bob Smith (NDP) 3583
- Mackie Morrison 741

Lincoln:

- (incumbent) Philip Andrewes (PC) 12226
- Gladys Huffman (L) 9004
- Barbara Mersereau (NDP) 2264
- Ken Lee 1036

London Centre:

- (incumbent) David Peterson (L) 13890
- Bill Rudd (PC) 6714
- Peter Cassidy (NDP) 4340
- Michelle McColm (F) 403

London North:

- (incumbent) Ron Van Horne (L) 20536
- George Auold (PC) 11433
- Marion Boyd (NDP) 5191
- Robert Smink (F) 566

London South:

- Joan Smith (L) 24522
- (incumbent) Gord Walker (PC) 17839
- David Winninger (NDP) 5080
- Robert Metz (F) 614

Middlesex:

- Doug Reycraft (L) 11292
- (incumbent) Bob Eaton (PC) 10482
- Larry Green (NDP) 2169

Mississauga East:

- (incumbent) Bud Gregory (PC) 14900
- Victor Maida (L) 12334
- Larry Taylor (NDP) 12015

Mississauga North:

- Steve Offer (L) 21369
- (incumbent) Terry Jones (PC) 19945
- Sylvia Weylie (NDP) 9943

Mississauga South:

- Margaret Marland (PC) 13186
- Carolynne Siller (L) 11623
- Barry Stevens (NDP) 4770

Muskoka:

- (incumbent) Frank Miller (PC) 12723
- Kenneth McClellan (L) 3036
- Bob Maguire (NDP) 2836

Niagara Falls:

- (incumbent) Vince Kerrio (L) 14658
- Ted Salci (PC) 8616
- Deloris Skilton (NDP) 6778

Nickel Belt:

- (incumbent) Floyd Laughren (NDP) 8912
- Evelyn Dutrisac (PC) 5849
- Trudy Bolduc (L) 2255

Nipissing:

- (incumbent) Mike Harris (PC) 14900
- Mike Gauthier (L) 11002
- Lynne Bennett (NDP) 3984

Northumberland:

- (incumbent) Howard Sheppard (PC) 14296
- Joan Fawcett (L) 12446
- Judi Armstrong (NDP) 3247

Oakville:

- Terry O'Connor (PC) 14265
- Doug Carrothers (L) 13578
- Kevin Flynn (NDP) 4390
- Chris Kowalchuk (G) 2008

Oakwood:

- (incumbent) Tony Grande (NDP) 10407
- Joe Ricciuti (L) 9631
- Harriet Wolman (PC) 4636
- Mike Sterling (Comm) 327

Oriole:

- Elinor Caplan (L) 17641
- (incumbent) John Williams (PC) 13557
- Lorne Strachan (NDP) 3660
- George Graham (Lbt) 1106

Oshawa:

- (incumbent) Mike Breaugh (NDP) 12686
- Bob Boychyn (PC) 7528
- Joe Neal (L) 5034

Ottawa Centre:

- (incumbent) Evelyn Gigantes (NDP) 11890
- Graham Bird (PC) 8005
- Pat Legris (L) 7103
- John Turmel 364

Ottawa East:

- (incumbent) Bernard Grandmaitre (L) 14601
- Kathryn Barnard (NDP) 3971
- Paul St. Georges (PC) 2257
- Serge Girard (politician)|Serge Girard 518

Ottawa South:

- (incumbent) Claude Bennett (PC) 12971
- Andrew Caddell (L) 11634
- John Smart (NDP) 8311

Ottawa West:

- (incumbent) Reuben Baetz (PC) 15089
- Alex Cullen (L) 12141
- Greg Ross (NDP) 4427
- Gregory Vezina (G) 701

Oxford:

- (incumbent) Dick Treleaven (PC) 15507
- Charlotte Sutherland (L) 10656
- Wayne Colburn (NDP) 5660
- Kaye Sargent (Lbt) 729
- Rick Spurgeon 577

Parkdale:

- (incumbent) Tony Ruprecht (L) 12065
- Richard Gilbert (NDP) 5176
- Tessie Jew (PC) 2052

Parry Sound:

- (incumbent) Ernie Eves (PC) 10904
- Richard Thomas (L) 9544
- Leo Gagne (NDP) 1130

Perth:

- (incumbent) Hugh Edighoffer (L) 20040
- Glynn Coghlin (PC) 6076
- Warren Ham (NDP) 2796

Peterborough:

- (incumbent) John Turner (PC) 16878
- Linda Slavin (NDP) 11941
- Bill Ayotte (L) 9734
- John Conlin (Lbt) 461
- George K. Kerr (G) 212

Port Arthur:

- (incumbent) Jim Foulds (NDP) 13084
- Swede Johnson (PC) 9826
- John Ranta (L) 6169

Prescott and Russell:

- (incumbent) Jean Poirier (L) 18833
- Guy Genier (PC) 11038
- Maurice Landry (NDP) 2625

Prince Edward—Lennox:

- (incumbent) James Taylor (PC) 10170
- Gordon Mylks (L) 6918
- Harry Plummer (NDP) 2307

Quinte:

- (incumbent) Hugh O’Neil (L) 18988
- Neil Robertson (PC) 9287
- Gene Morosan (NDP) 1817

Rainy River:

- Jack Pierce (PC) 5053
- Howard Hampton (NDP) 4775
- Ron King (L) 2944

Renfrew North:

- (incumbent) Sean Conway (L) 12849
- Bryan Hocking (PC) 5748
- Robert Cottingham (NDP) 740

Renfrew South:

- (incumbent) Paul Yakabuski (PC) 14182
- Dermott Calver (L) 9687
- Ish Theilheimer (NDP) 3420

Riverdale:

- David Reville (NDP) 9869
- Bret Snider (PC) 4590
- Doug DeMille (L) 3949
- Maggie Bizzell (Comm) 322
- Michael Tegtmeyer (G) 192

St. Andrew—St. Patrick:

- (incumbent) Larry Grossman (PC) 10332
- Meg Griffiths (NDP) 8373
- Jim DaCosta (L) 6330
- Cathy Laurier (Comm) 264
- Judy Hannon (G) 232

St. Catharines:

| Party | Candidate | Votes | % | +/- |
|---|---|---|---|---|
| Liberal | (incumbent) Jim Bradley | 20,605 | 57.94 | |
| Progressive Conservative | Elaine Herzog | 9,029 | 25.39 | |
| New Democratic | Michael Cormier | 5,624 | 15.81 | |
| Communist | Eric Blair | 305 | 0.86 | |
| Total valid votes | | 35,563 | 100.00 | |
| Rejected, unmarked and declined ballots | | 201 | | |
| Turnout | | 35,764 | 61.65 | |

St. David:

- Ian Scott (L) 13120
- Julian Porter (PC) 9702
- Barbara Hall (NDP) 4878
- Earl Epstein (Lbt) 227

St. George:

- (incumbent) Susan Fish (PC) 11378
- Diana Hunt (NDP) 10543
- Joseph Mifsud (L) 9361
- Michael Beech (Lbt) 1007
- Karol Siroky (Ind [New Tories]) 186

Sarnia:

- (incumbent) Andy Brandt (PC) 18651
- Michael Robb (L) 7438
- Duncan Longwell (NDP) 3572
- Margaret Coe (Lbt) 792

Sault Ste. Marie:

- Karl Morin-Strom (NDP) 16362
- (incumbent) Russ Ramsay (PC) 15293
- Roy Youngson (L) 4830

Scarborough Centre:

- William C. Davis (PC) 8890
- Gerald Lennon (L) 8531
- Barry Christensen (NDP) 7577

Scarborough East:

- Ed Fulton (L) 15855
- Verla Fiveash (PC) 11245
- Alawi Mohideen (NDP) 4381
- Jim McIntosh (Lbt) 1402

Scarborough—Ellesmere:

- David Warner (NDP) 10119
- (incumbent) Alan Robinson (PC) 9900
- Carole Lidgold (L) 6674
- George Dance (Lbt) 348

Scarborough North:

- Alvin Curling (L) 30504
- Carole Noble (PC) 22644
- Jerry Daca (NDP) 9072
- R.J. Austin 1972

Scarborough West:

- (incumbent) Richard Johnston (NDP) 12889
- Kurt Christensen (PC) 5994
- Anthony Judd (L) 4806
- John MacMillan 544

Simcoe Centre:

- Earl W. Rowe (PC) 15379
- Ross Whiteside (L) 14845
- Paul Wessenger (NDP) 9639
- Steve Kaasgaard 566

Simcoe East:

- (incumbent) Al McLean (PC) 13371
- Fayne Bullen (NDP) 11002
- George MacDonald (L) 7566

Stormont—Dundas—Glengarry and East Grenville:

- (incumbent) Noble Villeneuve (PC) 13119
- Bill Dillabough (L) 7036
- Rudi Derstroff (NDP) 1700

Sudbury:

- (incumbent) Jim Gordon (PC) 12591
- Ernie St-Jean (NDP) 7010
- Chris Nash (L) 6302

Sudbury East:

- (incumbent) Elie Martel (NDP) 17241
- George McDonald (PC) 9576
- Edelgard Mahant (L) 4726

Timiskaming:

- David Ramsay (NDP) 10765
- (incumbent) Ed Havrot (PC) 7941
- Dale Woods (L) 2026
- George Yeates 464

Victoria—Haliburton:

- (incumbent) John Eakins (L) 15340
- Murray Fearrey (PC) 11570
- Art Field (NDP) 3209

Waterloo North:

- (incumbent) Herbert Epp (L) 16458
- Lynne Woolstencroft (PC) 9149
- Richard Gerson (NDP) 4534

Welland—Thorold:

- (incumbent) Mel Swart (NDP) 17065
- Roy Smith (L) 6027
- Ed Minchin (PC) 5618

Wellington—Dufferin—Peel:

- (incumbent) Jack Johnson (PC) 14845
- Bruce Whiteside (L) 10401
- Sandy Young (NDP) 6395

Wellington South:

- Rick Ferraro (L) 17995
- Marilyn Robinson (PC) 12989
- Derek Fletcher (NDP) 6641

Wentworth:

- (incumbent) Gordon Dean (PC) 12322
- June Peace (L) 10337
- Sharon Lehnert (NDP) 8571
- Albert Papazian 947

Wentworth North:

- Chris Ward (L) 18328
- (incumbent) Ann Sloat (PC) 13160
- Lynn Spencer (NDP) 6158
- George Grinnell (G) 751

Wilson Heights:

- Monte Kwinter (L) 12363
- (incumbent) David Rotenberg (PC) 10175
- Howard Moscoe (NDP) 7793

Windsor—Riverside:

- (incumbent) Dave Cooke (NDP) 17883
- Ron Burgoyne (PC) 6719
- Ferguson Jenkins (L) 4418

Windsor—Sandwich:

- (incumbent) Bill Wrye (L) 10730
- Paul Forder (NDP) 7583
- Ron Arkell (PC) 3681
- Mike Longmoore (Comm) 197

Windsor—Walkerville:

- (incumbent) Bernard Newman (L) 9130
- Jane Boyd (PC) 6980
- Gary Parent (NDP) 6698

York Centre:

- (incumbent) Don Cousens (PC) 25022
- Ron Maheu (L) 19776
- Diane Meaghan (NDP) 7171
- Stewart Cole 2644

York East:

- (incumbent) Robert Elgie (PC) 11459
- Gord Crann (NDP) 9183
- Omar Chaudhery (L) 6629
- Ed McDonald (Comm) 929
- Kathy Sorensen (Lbt) 410

York Mills:

- (incumbent) Bette Stephenson (PC) 17943
- Gunnar Tannis (L) 10078
- Gord Doctorow (NDP) 6872
- Scott Bell (Lbt) 2339

York North:

- Greg Sorbara (L) 21291
- (incumbent) William Hodgson (PC) 17196
- Keith Munro (NDP) 7026

York South:

- (incumbent) Bob Rae (NDP) 16373
- Horace Hale (L) 6807
- Toomas Dunapuu (PC) 5321
- Paul Schulze 1063
- Lucille Boikoff 402
- Dusan Kubias (Lbt) 343

York West:

- (incumbent) Nick Leluk (PC) 14595
- Leonard Braithwaite (L) 13880
- Phil Jones (NDP) 6980
- Bob Dunk (Lbt) 1099

Yorkview:

- Claudio Polsinelli (L) 15986
- Mike Foster (NDP) 12658
- Leslie Soobrian (PC) 3431

== Post-election changes ==
York East (res. Robert Elgie, September 26, 1985), April 17, 1986:

- Christine Hart (L) 9347
- Gina Brannan (PC) 7956
- Gord Crann (NDP) 7928
- Jim McIntosh (Lbt) 243
- John MacLennan (Comm) 100
- Mark Adair (G) 60
- John Turmel (SC) (Note: Turmel ran as a "Social Credit Party of Ontario" candidate despite the fact that the party was long since defunct) 44
- Jack Arshawsky 27

Cochrane North (res. René Fontaine, 1986), August 14, 1986:

- René Fontaine (L) 8463
- Bertrand Proulx 766
- Judy Cole 606
- Graham McCready 185
- Kaye Sargent (Lbt) 99
- John Turmel 75

David Ramsay, elected as a New Democrat, joined the Liberal Party on October 6, 1986. Tony Lupusella, also elected as a New Democrat, joined the Liberal Party on December 17, 1986. After Lupusella's defection, the Liberals held as many seats in the legislative assembly as the Progressive Conservatives, at 51, (if the Speaker of the Legislature is included as a Liberal).

Paul Yakabuski, PC MPP for Renfrew South died July 31, 1987

== See also ==
- Politics of Ontario
- List of Ontario political parties
- Premier of Ontario
- Leader of the Opposition (Ontario)
- Independent candidates, 1985 Ontario provincial election
