= Bert Lawrence =

Canadian politician (1923–2007)

Ontario MPP
- In office 1967–1974
- Preceded by: New riding
- Succeeded by: Paul Frederick Taylor
- Constituency: Carleton East
- In office 1963–1967
- Preceded by: Gordon Lavergne
- Succeeded by: Riding abolished
- Constituency: Russell

Personal details
- Born: March 31, 1923 Calgary, Alberta
- Died: March 28, 2007 (aged 83) Gatineau, Quebec
- Party: Progressive Conservative
- Spouse: Lois Davidson
- Children: 4
- Occupation: Lawyer
- Awards: MC

Military service
- Years of service: 1944-1945
- Rank: Captain
- Unit: 8th Reconnaissance Regiment (14th Canadian Hussars)
- Battles/wars: D-Day, Liberation of the Netherlands

Albert Benjamin Rutter "Bert" Lawrence MC (March 31, 1923 – March 28, 2007) was a politician in Ontario, Canada. He was a Progressive Conservative member of the Legislative Assembly of Ontario from 1963 to 1974 who represented the ridings of Russell and Carleton East. He served as a cabinet minister in the governments of John Robarts and Bill Davis.

== Background ==
Lawrence was born in Calgary, Alberta, and grew up in Ottawa, Ontario. He was educated at Ashbury College and at Royal Military College of Canada in Kingston, Ontario. He enlisted in the army with the rank of Lieutenant in the 8th Reconnaissance Regiment (VIII Recce). He landed in Normandy in the first week of July 1944. He was decorated with the Military Cross by King George VI for engineering a bridge in an advance action at the Risle River near Brionne, France. He was injured twice including during V2 rocket attack near Antwerp in October 1944. Lawrence reflected on his narrow escapes from death. He wrote in his journal, "Keeping alive consists of 90 per cent luck and 10 per cent soldiering." He returned to action in February 1945 and participated to the end of the fighting. He was promoted to captain at the end of the war.

When he returned home he acquired a law degree at Osgoode Hall Law School. He graduated in 1948 and went to work for an Ottawa firm called Honeywell, Baker, Gibson, and Wotherspoon. He married Lois Davidson in October 1949 and they raised four children. He died in Gatineau, Quebec in 2007.

== Politics ==
In the 1950s he was elected to Gloucester, Ontario town council for two terms. In the 1956 Federal Conservative leadership convention he organized the campaign for Davie Fulton. While there was little chance of winning, his wife Lois said that he enjoyed immensely. She said, "They were so young, it was like they were lambs to slaughter. It was absolutely all-absorbing for what seemed like a month. There was huge hoopla and excitement."

In the 1963 provincial election, Lawrence ran as the Progressive Conservative candidate in the riding of Russell. He narrowly defeated Liberal candidate Fred Barrett by only 413 votes. In 1967 he ran in the redistributed riding of Carleton East. He defeated Liberal Eugene Bellemare by a comfortable margin of 4,221 votes. He was re-elected in 1971.

In 1969, Ontario Premier John Robarts brought Lawrence into the cabinet as minister without portfolio. In February 1970, he was promoted to Minister of Financial and Commercial Affairs. In March 1971 he was shuffled to Minister of Health.

During his time as Minister, he began to promote the idea of no-fault insurance, the first time it was discussed in the province. Lawrence felt that the current system was unfair to consumers as judgments were applied unevenly. While he felt this would benefit consumers he did not push hard on the issue due to his mindfulness of Ontario Insurance companies.

He ran in the 1971 leadership convention to succeed Robarts, and came in fifth place. The new premier, Bill Davis, appointed him as Minister of Health. In February 1972, he was assigned to the super-ministry post of Provincial Secretary for Resource Development. In March 1972, he flew to Cuba on a government jet to talk about trade. He defended the trip because he met with Cuban government officials and said that he had opened a number of doors. He was roundly criticized in the media and his influence was diminished as a result. In 1974 he said, "At that time, the government, the media and the public were much more resentful of Cuba's political position than they are today, and they were less appreciative of the trade opportunities than they are today."

Lawrence was dropped from cabinet altogether in February 1974. He decided to retire from the legislature later on in September. He returned to his law practice.

He attempted a move to federal politics by running as the Progressive Conservative Party of Canada candidate for Ottawa—Carleton in the 1980 federal election but was defeated by Liberal Jean-Luc Pépin.

=== Cabinet positions ===
Davis ministry, Province of Ontario (1971–1985)
Cabinet posts (2)
Predecessor	Office	Successor
New position	Provincial Secretary for Resource Development; 1972–1974	Allan Grossman
Thomas Wells	Minister of Health; 1971–1972	Richard Potter
Robarts ministry, Province of Ontario (1961–1971)
Cabinet posts (2)
Predecessor	Office	Successor
Leslie Rowntree	Minister of Financial and Commercial Affairs; 1970–1971	Arthur Wishart
Sub-Cabinet Post
Predecessor	Title	Successor
	Minister without portfolio (1969–1970)	
