= Carleton East =

Former provincial electoral district in Ontario, Canada

Ontario electoral district

Defunct provincial electoral district
- Legislature: Legislative Assembly of Ontario
- District created: 1967
- District abolished: 1999
- First contested: 1967
- Last contested: 1995

Demographics
- Census division(s): Carleton County (1967–1968); Regional Municipality of Ottawa-Carleton (1968–1999)
- Census subdivision(s): Gloucester, Osgoode (1967-1975), Ottawa, Rockcliffe Park

Carleton East was a provincial electoral district in Ontario, Canada. It was created for the 1967 election and was abolished in 1999 into Carleton—Gloucester and Ottawa—Vanier.

From 1986 until its abolition in 1998, the riding included most of the (now former) city of Gloucester, except the area north of Leitrim Road between Limebank Road and Conroy Road and the area north of the Queensway and west of Blair Road. Carleton East also included the (now former) village of Rockcliffe Park and the city of Ottawa north of Montreal Road and east of Rockcliffe Park.

== Members of Provincial Parliament ==
Carleton East
Assembly	Years	Member	Party
Created from Russell before the 1967 election
28th	1967–1971	Bert Lawrence	Progressive Conservative
29th	1971–1974	Bert Lawrence	Progressive Conservative
29th	1974–1975	Paul Frederick Taylor	Liberal
30th	1975–1977	Evelyn Gigantes	New Democratic
31st	1977–1981	Evelyn Gigantes	New Democratic
32nd	1981–1985	Bob MacQuarrie	Progressive Conservative
33rd	1985–1987	Gilles Morin	Liberal
34th	1987–1990	Gilles Morin	Liberal
35th	1990–1995	Gilles Morin	Liberal
36th	1995–1999	Gilles Morin	Liberal
Sourced from the Ontario Legislative Assembly
Merged into Carleton—Gloucester and Ottawa—Vanier before the 1999 election

== Election results ==
1995 Ontario general election
Party	Candidate	Votes	%	±%
Liberal	Gilles Morin	17,780	48.19	–5.68
Progressive Conservative	Jeff Slater	13,571	36.79	+22.32
New Democratic	Fiona Faucher	4,783	12.96	–15.24
Natural Law	Ian A. G. Campbell	758	2.05	–
Total valid votes		36,892	99.19	
Total rejected, unmarked and declined ballots		302	0.81	–0.23
Turnout		37,194	60.34	–3.18
Eligible voters		61,643		
Liberal hold		Swing		–14.00
Source: Elections Ontario

1990 Ontario general election
Party	Candidate	Votes	%	±%
Liberal	Gilles Morin	19,059	53.88	–10.21
New Democratic	Joan Gullen	9,976	28.20	+9.30
Progressive Conservative	Judy Corbishley	5,117	14.46	+0.31
Family Coalition	Wilfrid André Lafrance	1,224	3.46	+0.59
Total valid votes		35,376	98.96	
Total rejected, unmarked and declined ballots		371	1.04	+0.66
Turnout		35,747	63.52	+2.68
Eligible voters		56,279		
Liberal hold		Swing		–9.76
Source: Elections Ontario

1987 Ontario general election
Party	Candidate	Votes	%	±%
Liberal	Gilles Morin	20,706	64.09	+15.95
New Democratic	Joan Gullen	6,105	18.90	+0.59
Progressive Conservative	Roland Saumure	4,572	14.15	–19.41
Family Coalition	Wilfrid André Lafrance	926	2.87	–
Total valid votes		32,309	99.63	
Total rejected ballots		121	0.37	–0.06
Turnout		32,430	60.84	+3.31
Eligible voters		53,304		
Liberal hold		Swing		+7.68
Source: Elections Ontario

1985 Ontario general election
Party	Candidate	Votes	%	±%
Liberal	Gilles Morin	23,221	48.14	+14.19
Progressive Conservative	Bob MacQuarrie	16,188	33.56	–4.47
New Democratic	Joan Gullen	8,829	18.30	–9.72
Total valid votes		48,238	99.56	
Total rejected ballots		211	0.44	+0.14
Turnout		48,449	57.53	–1.79
Eligible voters		84,212		
Liberal gain from Progressive Conservative		Swing		+9.33
Source: Elections Ontario

1981 Ontario general election
Party	Candidate	Votes	%	±%
Progressive Conservative	Bob MacQuarrie	15,714	38.03	+5.12
Liberal	Bernard Grandmaître	14,028	33.95	+1.63
New Democratic	Evelyn Gigantes	11,579	28.02	–6.75
Total valid votes		41,321	99.70	
Total rejected ballots		123	0.30	–0.03
Turnout		41,444	59.32	–5.72
Eligible voters		69,867		
Progressive Conservative gain from New Democratic		Swing		+5.94
Source: Elections Ontario

1977 Ontario general election
Party	Candidate	Votes	%	±%
New Democratic	Evelyn Gigantes	12,733	34.77	–1.25
Progressive Conservative	Darwin Kealey	12,052	32.91	+4.11
Liberal	Ed Ryan	11,837	32.32	–2.86
Total valid votes		36,622	99.67	
Total rejected ballots		121	0.33	+0.03
Turnout		36,743	65.04	–1.50
Eligible voters		56,496		
New Democratic hold		Swing		–2.68
Source: Elections Ontario

1975 Ontario general election
Party	Candidate	Votes	%	±%
New Democratic	Evelyn Gigantes	11,982	36.02	+0.31
Liberal	Paul Frederick Taylor	11,701	35.18	–1.41
Progressive Conservative	Darwin Kealey	9,579	28.80	+1.10
Total valid votes		33,262	99.70	
Total rejected ballots		99	0.30	–0.04
Turnout		33,361	66.53	–
Eligible voters		50,143		
New Democratic gain from Liberal		Swing		+0.86
Source: Elections Ontario

Ontario provincial by-election, November 7, 1974 Resignation of Bert Lawrence
Party	Candidate	Votes	%	±%
Liberal	Paul Frederick Taylor	9,989	36.59	+4.58
New Democratic	Evelyn Gigantes	9,749	35.71	+14.29
Progressive Conservative	Pierre Benoit	7,562	27.70	–18.87
Total valid votes		27,300	99.67	
Total rejected ballots		91	0.33	–0.14
Turnout		27,391	–	–
Eligible voters				
Liberal gain from Progressive Conservative		Swing		+11.73
Source: Elections Ontario

1971 Ontario general election
Party	Candidate	Votes	%	±%
Progressive Conservative	Bert Lawrence	13,190	46.56	–13.67
Liberal	Fred Barrett	9,067	32.01	–0.65
New Democratic	Jean Usher	6,069	21.43	+14.32
Total valid votes		28,326	99.53	
Total rejected ballots		134	0.47	–0.03
Turnout		28,460	65.97	+13.48
Eligible voters		43,141		
Progressive Conservative hold		Swing		–6.51
Source: Elections Ontario

1967 Ontario general election
Party	Candidate	Votes	%
Progressive Conservative	Bert Lawrence	9,111	60.24
Liberal	Eugène Bellemare	4,939	32.65
New Democratic	Elaine Lund	1,075	7.11
Total valid votes		15,125	99.50
Total rejected ballots		76	0.50
Turnout		15,201	52.49
Eligible voters		28,958	
Progressive Conservative pickup new district.			
Source: Elections Ontario

== See also ==
- List of Ontario provincial electoral districts
- Canadian provincial electoral districts
