= Bob MacQuarrie =

Canadian politician

Robert Waldron MacQuarrie (November 24, 1926 – January 11, 2007) was a politician in Ontario, Canada. He served in the Legislative Assembly of Ontario from 1981 to 1985, as a member of the Progressive Conservative Party.

MacQuarrie was born in Rexton, New Brunswick, educated at Princes of Wales College (later renamed the University of Prince Edward Island), and practiced law with the firm of Cuzner, MacQuarrie.

He began his political career at the municipal level, serving as reeve of Gloucester Township in Ontario from 1972 to 1978, and as a councillor in the Municipality of Ottawa-Carleton from 1969 to 1978. In 1980–81, he was director of the Eastern Ontario Development Corporation.

He was elected to the Ontario legislature in the 1981 provincial election, defeating Liberal candidate Bernard Grandmaitre and New Democrat Evelyn Gigantes in a close three-way contest for Carleton East. MacQuarrie served as a government backbencher for the next four years, acting as parliamentary assistant to the Solicitor-General and Attorney-General. In January 1985, he supported Roy McMurtry's bid to succeed Bill Davis as leader of the Progressive Conservative Party.

The Progressive Conservatives were reduced to a tenuous minority government in the 1985 provincial election, and lost power to David Peterson's Liberals. MacQuarrie was defeated in Carleton East, losing to Liberal candidate Gilles Morin by 7,033 votes.

The City of Ottawa named a sports complex after Bob Macquarrie - The "Bob MacQuarrie-Orléans Recreation Complex" located at 1490 Youville Drive in Orléans, Ontario, Canada.
