= 1971 Progressive Conservative Party of Ontario leadership election =

- Date: February 12, 1971
- Convention: Maple Leaf Gardens, Toronto, Ontario
- Resigning leader: John Robarts
- Won by: Bill Davis
- Ballots: 4
- Candidates: 6

The 1971 Progressive Conservative Party of Ontario leadership election was held on February 12 of that year to replace retiring premier John Robarts. The party selected Bill Davis on the fourth ballot.

== Background ==
The change in leadership came about when John Robarts announced his retirement plans on December 1, 1970. Five sitting members quickly announced their intention to vie for the leadership. Bill Davis was the early front runner and was seen as the candidate of the party establishment. He had support of 14 cabinet ministers and 42 Members of Provincial Parliament (MPPs). Allan Lawrence was viewed as suave and a bit of a maverick. He attracted supporters who disliked Davis' education expenditures. Darcy McKeough, Bob Welch and Bert Lawrence had less support and were viewed as compromise candidates. Robert Pharand was a late entry into the race. He was a 26-year-old graduate student from Ottawa who announced his intention to run on January 31, 1971. He represented a small group of young Conservative members who felt the five established candidates were not speaking clearly enough about the issues.

== The convention ==
The convention was held at Maple Leaf Gardens in Toronto between February 11–12, 1971. On the first night speeches were made by the candidates. Davis defended his record at the Ministry of Education. He described himself as resolute decisive and steadfast. The text read well but he spoke in a monotone that lessened the impact. Some argued that the speech 'fell flat'. Darcy McKeough spoke next. He gave an aggressive speech. He tried to cast himself as the compromise candidate, neither for the establishment (Davis) nor for the dissidents (A. Lawrence). Bob Welch discarded his prepared speech and gave a fierce rendering of his vision. He pledged himself to a more open party. Allan Lawrence ignored his previous arguments about excessive spending on education and government services. Instead he described himself as natural successor to Robarts, a preserver of Canadian unity and Ontario's greatness. Some observers felt his speech was cheeky and presumptuous but it went down well with his organizers. Bert Lawrence who realized that he was well behind in the polls, promised an improved relationship between government and people, structural reform of the cabinet, an enlarged role for backbenchers, and better coordination of the work of the civil service.

== Voting procedure ==
On the second day, voting took place. 15 large voting machines were placed in the middle of the floor. Alan Eagleson, a key organizer of the convention, explained to delegates how the voting machines would work. Voting began at 3:15 pm but after an hour it was announced that 12 of the 15 machines had failed work properly. During the next two hours conference organizers met with the manufacturer of the machines and candidates. The manufacturers claimed that nothing was wrong with their machines and it was the delegates who had failed to use them properly. After a meeting with the candidates, there was unanimous agreement that the first ballot be scrapped and that it be redone using paper ballots. This was announced to the delegates at about 6:15 pm. Voting didn't take place until about 7:45 pm and the results were announced about 9 pm.

In the meantime, unofficial results from the machine vote had leaked out and there was intense discussions between candidates and their organizers. When the first paper ballot results were announced, Davis was in the lead by 117 votes. Both Robert Pharand and Bert Lawrence dropped out and refused to endorse anyone. The second ballot began at about 10 pm and the results had Bob Welch in last place. Darcy McKeough tried to make a deal with him but he was turned down. Welch felt that to make a deal with McKeough would go against his principles for an open party. He refused to make an endorsement. After the third ballot, McKeough was in last place and he gave his endorsement to Davis. The fourth ballot results were announced at 2 am. It gave Davis the victory by only 44 votes.

Analysis of the results focused on why Davis almost lost. Some argued that Davis' moderate stance was almost outshone by Lawrence who curried favour with more right-wing Conservatives. In terms of delegates, Lawrence and Davis were virtually tied. The deciding factor was the sitting MPPs who voted almost entirely for Davis.

== Ballot results ==
Delegate support by ballot
Candidate	1st ballot (cancelled)		1st ballot		2nd ballot		3rd ballot		4th ballot	
Name	Votes cast	%	Votes cast	%	Votes cast	%	Votes cast	%	Votes cast	%
Bill Davis	502	32.2	548	33.1	595	36.0	669	41.3	812	51.4
Allan Lawrence	379	24.3	431	26.0	498	30.1	606	37.4	768	48.6
Darcy McKeough	260	16.7	273	16.5	288	17.4	346	21.3	Endorsed Davis	
Bob Welch	252	16.2	270	16.3	271	16.4	No endorsement			
Bert Lawrence	154	9.9	128	7.7	No endorsement					
Robert Pharand	13	0.8	7	0.4	No endorsement					
Total	1,560	100.0	1,657	100.0	1,652	100.0	1,621	100.0	1,580	100.0
