= John Snobelen =

Canadian politician

The Honourable John Snobelen ECO

Ontario MPP
- In office 1999–2003
- Preceded by: New riding
- Succeeded by: Bob Delaney
- Constituency: Mississauga West
- In office 1995–1999
- Preceded by: Steve Offer
- Succeeded by: Riding abolished
- Constituency: Mississauga North

Personal details
- Born: 1954 (age 71–72) Guelph, Ontario
- Party: Progressive Conservative
- Occupation: Businessman

John Snobelen (born c. 1954) is a former politician in Ontario, Canada. He was a Progressive Conservative member of the Legislative Assembly of Ontario from 1995 to 2003, and served as a cabinet minister in the government of Mike Harris.

== Background ==
Snobelen was raised in Meadowlark, Ontario, and dropped out of high school in Grade 11. He eventually became a successful businessman, making a fortune in the waste-haulage business. He served as President of Jarsno Environmental Inc., Mid-Ontario Equipment Limited and the Cameron Group.

Snobelen was also president of the Hunger Project in Canada, and an associate of the Carter Center, a human-rights organization started by former United States President Jimmy Carter.

== Politics ==
Snobelen ran for the Ontario legislature in the provincial election of 1990, placing third behind incumbent Liberal Steve Offer and a New Democrat in Mississauga North. In the provincial election of 1995, he ran in the same riding and defeated Offer by about 4,500 votes.

The Progressive Conservatives won a majority government in the 1995 election, and Snobelen was appointed as Minister of Education and Training in Mike Harris's government on June 26, 1995. Shortly after his appointment, Snobelen was filmed arguing that the PC government needs to "bankrupt" and to create a "useful crisis" in the education system so as to initiate significant reforms. This controversy provoked several calls for his resignation, and further unsettled the relationship between the government and the teaching community, which were already tense after the previous NDP administration unilaterally imposed a Social Contract.

In 1997, Snobelen introduced Bill 160, which gave the province control of municipal education taxes, introduced standardized testing, cut teaching preparation time, allowed the government to determine class sizes and granted early retirement initiatives to older, more experienced teachers. Critics argue that the purpose of this bill was to cut education spending, and reduce the power of the teachers' unions in order to privatize Ontario's public education system (Klein, N., The Shock Doctrine). The education restructuring, along with other cuts to government spending, was expected to significantly reduce the province's deficit. Community organizations, teachers and leaders of the provincial unions criticized the bill not only as an attack on local control of public schools and on union bargaining influence, but also as unnecessarily confrontational and as threatening the quality of Ontario's education system.

Snobelen was moved to the Ministry of Natural Resources on October 10, 1997. Arguments with the teacher's unions and accusations that a high school dropout who didn't understand the education portfolio led to his transfer. Snobelen's increasingly hostile fight with the unions was the main reason that prompted Harris to shuffle his cabinet at this time.

Shortly after his transfer, Ontario's public school teachers entered a two-week strike against the Harris government, with much of their anger directed against the reforms proposed by Snobelen. The Harris government argued that two million students were being held "hostage" by the strike and denounced the teachers for striking in violation of provincial labour laws. Some also criticized the teachers for using their work hours to participate in union activities. Teachers' representatives argued that they had no other viable options to oppose the proposed legislation. A provincial judge later determined that the provincial government did not meet its obligations in seeking to resolve the strike.

Snobelen's successor as Minister of Education, David Johnson, implemented many aspects of Bill 160 after the strike.

As Natural Resources Minister, Snobelen helped push through the Harris government's "Lands For Life" program, which protected 24,000 km² of public land in parks and conservation reserves, making them off-limit to industrial activity. He also cancelled the Spring Bear Hunt, a decision which was opposed by many Ontario hunters but supported by animal rights groups.

He was re-elected in the provincial election of 1999, defeating Liberal Bob Delaney in the redistributed riding of Mississauga West. He retained the Natural Resources portfolio after the election.

Snobelen was dropped from cabinet when Ernie Eves succeeded Harris as Premier in 2002.

In late 2002, it was reported that Snobelen was spending most of his time at a private cattle ranch in Oklahoma while still drawing a Member of Provincial Parliament's (MPP) salary. Faced with criticism, he returned to the legislature for most of the 2003 session and resigned his seat on March 17.

=== Cabinet positions ===
Harris ministry, Province of Ontario (1995–2002)
Cabinet posts (2)
Predecessor	Office	Successor
Chris Hodgson	Minister of Natural Resources; 1997–2002	Jerry Ouellette
Dave Cooke	Minister of Education; 1995–1997	David Johnson

== After politics ==
On January 13, 2007, he was arrested in Milton, Ontario for the possession of an unregistered handgun. He was granted an absolute discharge in April 2008, though the judge noted that he had made a serious error in judgement.

In 2012, Snobelen ran for the Presidency of the Progressive Conservative Party of Ontario, finishing second to Richard Ciano.
