= Paul Schulze (candidate) =

Paul Schulze was a candidate in York South for the 1985 Ontario provincial election. He was 37 years old, and was a television production assistant for Crossroads Christian Communications Inc. His campaign was centred on "family values" issues, including opposition to abortion. He received 1,063 votes (3.51%), finishing fourth against New Democratic Party leader Bob Rae.
