= Julian Reed =

Canadian politician (1936–2022)

Member of Parliament for Halton (Halton—Peel; 1993–1996)
- In office October 25, 1993 – June 28, 2004
- Preceded by: Garth Turner
- Succeeded by: Gary Carr

Member of the Ontario Provincial Parliament for Halton—Burlington
- In office September 18, 1975 – May 2, 1985
- Preceded by: Riding established
- Succeeded by: Don Knight

Personal details
- Born: Julian Alexander Arnott Reed; January 27, 1936 Toronto, Ontario, Canada
- Died: January 6, 2022 (aged 85) Georgetown, Ontario, Canada
- Party: Ontario Liberal (1975-1985); Liberal (1993-2004)
- Occupation: Farmer, actor

Julian Alexander Arnott Reed (January 27, 1936 – January 6, 2022) was a Canadian politician in Ontario, Canada. He was a Liberal member of the Legislative Assembly of Ontario from 1975 to 1985 representing the riding of Halton—Burlington. He was also a Federal Liberal MP in the House of Commons of Canada from 1993 to 2004.

== Background ==
Reed was born in Toronto, Ontario, and educated at Ontario Agricultural College at the University of Guelph. He worked as a farmer, and was also a professional actor.

== Provincial politics ==
Reed was elected to the Ontario legislature in the 1975 provincial election as a member of the Ontario Liberal Party, defeating Progressive Conservative candidate Gary Dawkins by 463 votes in Halton—Burlington. He was re-elected in the elections of 1977 and 1981. The Progressive Conservatives were the governing party in Ontario throughout this period, and Reed served for ten years as a member of the opposition. He did not seek re-election in 1985.

== Federal politics ==
Reed returned to political life in the 1993 federal election, defeating Progressive Conservative cabinet minister Garth Turner by 3,991 votes in Halton—Peel. He was re-elected by greater margins in the 1997 and 2000 campaigns. He served as a backbench supporter of the Jean Chrétien and Paul Martin administrations. He served as Parliamentary Secretary to the Minister for International Trade from 1997 to 1998 and to the Minister of Foreign Affairs from 1998 to 1999. Reed did not seek re-election in 2004.

== Later life and death ==
Reed was a supporter of renewable energy throughout his political career, and was the keynote speaker at a 2002 meeting of the Canadian Solar Industries Association. Reed died in Georgetown, Ontario on January 6, 2022.
