= Terry David Jones =

Canadian politician

Terry Jones

Ontario MPP
- In office 1975–1985
- Preceded by: New Riding
- Succeeded by: Steve Offer
- Constituency: Mississauga North

Personal details
- Born: June 13, 1938 Toronto, Ontario
- Died: March 21, 2014 (aged 75) Cambridge, Ontario
- Party: Progressive Conservative
- Spouse: Donna (div. 1986)
- Children: 3
- Occupation: Insurance agent

Terry David Jones (June 13, 1938 - March 21, 2014) was a former politician in Ontario, Canada. He served in the Legislative Assembly of Ontario from 1975 to 1985 as a member of the Progressive Conservative Party.

== Background ==
Jones was born in Toronto, and educated at the University of Toronto. He worked for his family building cottages in Muskoka. Later he established an insurance business in Streetsville, Ontario.

== Politics ==
He was elected to the Ontario legislature in the 1975 provincial election, defeating New Democratic Party candidate David Busby by 385 votes in Mississauga North. In 1976, Jones chaired a commission which established the provincial drinking age at nineteen.

He defeated Busby again by a greater margin in the 1977 election, and won by a significant majority in 1981. Jones was a backbench supporter of the William Davis and Frank Miller governments, and was named Deputy Speaker on October 11, 1983. During his time in office he served as Parliamentary Assistant to several ministers including the Provincial Secretary for Social Development and the Minister of the Treasury and Economics.

The Progressive Conservatives suffered an electoral setback in the 1985 election, and Jones lost his seat to Liberal candidate Steve Offer by 1,424 votes.

=== Parliamentary positions ===
Special Parliamentary Responsibilities
Predecessor	Title	Successor
Sam Cureatz	Deputy Speaker; 1983-1985	Dick Treleaven

== After politics ==
In 1992, Jones was convicted of fraud related to a property development scheme and sentenced to six months in jail. Jones had set up a land deal and promised investors that large profits would result from the sale of the land. Instead the deal went sour and investors lost $1,010,000. Jones's lawyer contended that his client did not personally profit from the deal. In 1999, he was ordered to give up his licence to sell insurance. He spent his remaining years working as a consultant and became an amateur painter. He was age 75 when he died.
