= Paul Frederick Taylor =

Canadian politician

Paul Taylor

Ontario MPP
- In office 1974–1975
- Preceded by: Bert Lawrence
- Succeeded by: Evelyn Gigantes
- Constituency: Carleton East

Personal details
- Born: July 30, 1939 (age 87) Montreal, Quebec
- Party: Liberal
- Occupation: News media executive

Paul Frederick Taylor (born July 30, 1939) is a former politician in Ontario, Canada. He was a Liberal member of the Legislative Assembly of Ontario from 1974 to 1975 who represented the Ottawa area riding of Carleton East.

== Background ==
Taylor was born in 1939. He worked as a radio broadcaster before being elected as an MPP. He lives in Toronto, Ontario.

== Politics ==
On November 7, 1974, Taylor was elected in a by-election that was necessitated by the retirement of the PC MPP, Bert Lawrence. He defeated NDP candidate Evelyn Gigantes by 240 votes. In his maiden speech, he appealed for better treatment of Ontario's francophone population and he lamented the lack of French language services in the province. He said, "I was shocked and deeply disturbed to learn on election day that nowhere in the polling places was there any voting information in French." His time in office was short as an election was called for September 18, 1975. In a rematch with Gigantes, Taylor was defeated by 281 votes.

== Later life ==
After leaving political office, Taylor was the Ottawa Bureau Chief & Managing Editor for Newsradio Canada, a division of Maclean Hunter Broadcasting and, most recently, he is the Owner and President of Personal Aspirations Inc.
