= Halton—Burlington =

Former provincial electoral district in Ontario, Canada

Ontario electoral district

Defunct provincial electoral district
- Legislature: Legislative Assembly of Ontario
- District created: 1974
- District abolished: 1986
- First contested: 1975
- Last contested: 1985

Halton—Burlington was a provincial electoral district in Ontario, Canada. It existed from 1975 to 1987, when it was abolished when the riding was redistributed to Halton Centre and Halton North. It consisted of the city of Burlington in the Halton region.

In its history it was represented by Liberals Julian Reed and Don Knight.

== Members ==
Halton—Burlington
Assembly	Years	Member	Party
Riding created out of Halton East and Halton West
30th	1975–1977	Julian Reed	Liberal
31st	1977–1981	Julian Reed	Liberal
32nd	1981–1985	Julian Reed	Liberal
33rd	1985–1987	Don Knight	Liberal
Riding dissolved into Halton Centre and Halton North

== Election results ==
1985 Ontario general election
Party	Candidate	Votes	%	±%
Liberal	Don Knight	14,991	42.46	–2.53
Progressive Conservative	Peter Pomeroy	14,777	41.86	–1.40
New Democratic	Doug Hamilton	4,871	13.80	+2.04
Independent	Neil J. Sivertson	665	1.88	–
Total valid votes		35,304	99.57	
Total rejected ballots		151	0.43	–0.06
Turnout		35,455	58.91	+2.67
Eligible voters		60,188		
Liberal hold		Swing		–0.57
Source: Elections Ontario

1981 Ontario general election
Party	Candidate	Votes	%	±%
Liberal	Julian Reed	13,395	44.99	–1.83
Progressive Conservative	Fran Baines	12,877	43.25	+8.81
New Democratic	Chris Cutler	3,500	11.76	–6.99
Total valid votes		29,772	99.52	
Total rejected ballots		145	0.48	+0.26
Turnout		29,917	56.24	–12.84
Eligible voters		53,198		
Liberal hold		Swing		–5.32
Source: Elections Ontario

1977 Ontario general election
Party	Candidate	Votes	%	±%
Liberal	Julian Reed	13,985	46.82	+7.68
Progressive Conservative	George Gray	10,287	34.44	–3.05
New Democratic	William (Bill) Johnson	5,598	18.74	–4.63
Total valid votes		29,870	99.77	
Total rejected ballots		68	0.23	–0.06
Turnout		29,938	69.08	–3.56
Eligible voters		43,337		
Liberal hold		Swing		+5.37
Source: Elections Ontario

1975 Ontario general election
Party	Candidate	Votes	%
Liberal	Julian Reed	10,998	39.14
Progressive Conservative	Gary Dawkins	10,535	37.49
New Democratic	William A. Johnson	6,567	23.37
Total valid votes		28,100	99.72
Total rejected ballots		80	0.28
Turnout		28,180	72.65
Eligible voters		38,791	
Liberal pickup new district.			
Source: Elections Ontario

== See also ==
- List of Ontario provincial electoral districts
- Canadian provincial electoral districts
