= Gilles Morin =

Canadian politician

The Honourable Gilles Morin ECO

Ontario MPP
- In office 1985–1999
- Preceded by: Bob MacQuarrie
- Succeeded by: Riding abolished
- Constituency: Carleton East

Personal details
- Born: 20 July 1931 (age 94) Dolbeau-Mistassini, Quebec, Canada
- Party: Liberal
- Occupation: Investment dealer

Military service
- Years of service: 1951–1964
- Rank: Captain
- Unit: Royal 22^{e} Régiment; Governor General's Foot Guards
- Battles/wars: Korea

Gilles Morin (born July 20, 1931) is a retired politician in Ontario, Canada. He served as a Liberal member of the Legislative Assembly of Ontario from 1985 to 1999, and was briefly a cabinet minister in Ontario.

== Background ==
Morin was educated at the Séminaire de Québec, the Académie Commerciale de Québec and the École Supérieure Montcalm. He was a member of the Regular Forces of the Canadian Army from 1951 to 1959, and served in Korea with the 3rd Battalion of the Royal 22^{e} Régiment. He was an aide-de-camp to Governors General Vincent Massey and Georges Vanier from 1957 to 1959, and served in the Governor General's Foot Guards from 1959 to 1964. He retired with the rank of captain.

Morin subsequently became an investment dealer, and was president of the Caisse populaire Montfort for three years. In 1976, he also served as Director of Regional Services for the Office of the Ombudsman in Ontario.

== Politics ==
He was elected to the Ontario legislature in the 1985 provincial election, defeating incumbent Progressive Conservative Bob MacQuarrie by over 7,000 votes in the Carleton East constituency. The Liberal Party formed a minority government after this election, and Morin served as an Assistant Speaker for the next two years.

He was easily re-elected in the 1987 election. From August 2, 1989, to October 1, 1990, he briefly served as a Minister without portfolio responsible for Senior Citizens Affairs in the government of David Peterson.

Morin was easily returned again in the 1990 election, although the Liberals were upset by the New Democratic Party. For the next five years, he served in parliament as Deputy Speaker.

He faced the most difficult election of his career in the 1995 election, defeating Progressive Conservative Jeff Slater by just over 4,000 votes. The Progressive Conservatives won the election, and Morin again served as a Deputy Speaker for the next four years. He did not run for re-election in 1999. Morin endorsed Dalton McGuinty's bid to lead the Ontario Liberal Party in 1996.

== Later life ==
In 1999, he became a member of the Ontario Highway Transport Board, which regulates the province's intercity bus industry.
