= Steve Offer =

Canadian politician

The Honourable Steve Offer ECO

Ontario MPP
- In office 1985–1995
- Preceded by: Terry Jones
- Succeeded by: John Snobelen
- Constituency: Mississauga North

Personal details
- Born: November 4, 1949 (age 76) Toronto, Ontario
- Party: Liberal
- Spouse: Karen
- Children: 3
- Occupation: Lawyer
- Profession: Business executive

Steven Offer (born November 4, 1949) is a former politician in Ontario, Canada. He was a Liberal member of the Legislative Assembly of Ontario from 1985 to 1995 who represented the riding of Mississauga North. He served as a cabinet minister in the government of David Peterson.

== Background ==
Offer has a Bachelor of Arts degree from York University, and a law degree from Osgoode Hall.

== Politics ==
He was elected to the Ontario legislature in the 1985 provincial election, defeating incumbent Progressive Conservative Terry Jones by 1,424 votes in Mississauga North. The Liberal party formed a minority government after the election, and Offer served as parliamentary assistant to the Minister of Consumer and Commercial Relations from June 26, 1985 to September 1987.

Offer was easily re-elected in the 1987 provincial election, in which the Liberal party won a landslide majority. He continued serving as a parliamentary assistant until August 2, 1989, when he was promoted to cabinet as Solicitor General.

In 1990, Offer was challenged for the Liberal nomination in Mississauga North by a representative of the local Sikh community, who claimed that the Peterson government was insufficiently responsive to the concerns of minorities. He won the challenge, and was narrowly re-elected in the 1990 provincial election, defeating New Democratic Party candidate John Foster by 1,442 votes. The Liberals lost the provincial election to the NDP, and Offer moved to the opposition benches. In opposition, he served as his party's critic for Labour and Environment.

The Progressive Conservatives won a majority government in the 1995 provincial election, and Offer lost to Tory candidate John Snobelen by over 4,000 votes.

After politics, Offer continued with a number of charitable causes. He is currently the Senior Vice President (Sales, Business Development and Government Relations) with FNF Canada. which is a division of Fidelity National Financial .

=== Cabinet posts ===
Peterson ministry, Province of Ontario (1985–1990)
Cabinet post (1)
Predecessor	Office	Successor
Ian Scott	Solicitor General; 1989-1990	Mike Farnan
