= Don Knight (politician) =

Canadian politician

Ontario MPP
- In office 1985–1987
- Preceded by: Julian Reed
- Succeeded by: Riding abolished
- Constituency: Halton—Burlington

Personal details
- Born: April 9, 1942 (age 84) Meaford, Ontario
- Party: Liberal
- Occupation: Insurance broker

Donald S. Knight (born April 9, 1942) is a former politician in Ontario, Canada. He was a Liberal member of the Legislative Assembly of Ontario from 1985 to 1987 who represented the riding of Halton—Burlington.

== Background ==
Knight was born in Meaford, Ontario and attended the University of Waterloo. He worked as an insurance broker. Knight was a member of the Optimist Club of Milton and the Murton Lodge of Perfection.

== Politics ==
Knight was a councillor in Milton, Ontario from 1980 to 1985.

He was elected to the Ontario legislature in the 1985 provincial election for Halton—Burlington, defeating Progressive Conservative candidate Peter Pomeroy by 214 votes. The Liberal Party formed a minority government after the election, and Knight served as parliamentary assistant to the Chair of the Management Board of Cabinet in 1987. He did not seek re-election in the 1987 campaign.

== Later life ==
Knight has remained active with Ontario's network of Optimist Clubs since leaving politics.

== See also ==
- List of University of Waterloo people
