= Evelyn Gigantes =

Canadian politician (1942–2026)

The Honourable Evelyn Gigantes ECO

Ontario MPP
- In office 1990–1995
- Preceded by: Richard Patten
- Succeeded by: Richard Patten
- Constituency: Ottawa Centre
- In office 1985–1987
- Preceded by: Michael Cassidy
- Succeeded by: Richard Patten
- Constituency: Ottawa Centre
- In office 1975–1981
- Preceded by: Paul Frederick Taylor
- Succeeded by: Bob MacQuarrie
- Constituency: Carleton East

Personal details
- Born: Evelyn Adelaide Peach; November 1, 1942 Yarmouth, Nova Scotia, Canada
- Died: January 16, 2026 (aged 83)
- Party: New Democrat
- Spouse(s): Terry Gigantes (div.); John Sifton
- Children: 2
- Occupation: Radio and television broadcaster

Evelyn Adelaide Gigantes (November 1, 1942 – January 16, 2026) was a Canadian politician who served as a New Democratic Party member of the Legislative Assembly of Ontario for five terms between 1975 and 1995. She was a cabinet minister in the Government of Ontario under premier Bob Rae.

== Background ==
Gigantes was born in Yarmouth, Nova Scotia, on November 1, 1942. She was raised in Aylmer, Quebec. Her father, Earle Peach, was an author who wrote a book called Memories of a Cape Breton Childhood. She earned a Bachelor of Arts degree from Carleton University. She worked as a radio and television broadcaster before entering political life, and was for a time an interviewer with the Canadian Broadcasting Corporation, and host of her own current affairs show in Ottawa. During her time out of political office, she was a member of the City of Ottawa Municipal Energy Planning Project and served as a representative on women's issues for the National Union of Provincial Government Employees. Gigantes had a daughter, Clea, from a first marriage and a son, Matthew, with her second husband, John Sifton.

== Politics ==
=== Carleton East ===
Gigantes ran for the Ontario legislature in a by-election held on November 7, 1974. She was defeated by Progressive Conservative Paul Frederick Taylor in the Ottawa-area riding of Carleton East, losing by 240 votes. The following year, however, she defeated Taylor by 281 votes in the provincial election of 1975. During her first term she was the NDP's critic for energy and later, education.

In the provincial election of 1977 Gigantes was re-elected over Progressive Conservative Darwin Kealey by 781 votes. In the summer of 1980, Gigantes gave birth to her first child. The birth was a first for a sitting Ontario MPP. She said the baby was conceived during an NDP convention the previous fall. She quipped, "It was one of the most positive products of the convention."

In the 1981 provincial election she finished third behind both Liberal Bernard Grandmaitre and the winner, Progressive Conservative Bob MacQuarrie.

=== Ottawa Centre ===
Gigantes returned to the legislature through a by-election win in Ottawa Centre on December 13, 1984, called after former Ontario NDP leader Michael Cassidy resigned as MPP (Cassidy had won election to the House of Commons at Ottawa Centre with the Canadian NDP in the federal election). She defeated Progressive Conservative candidate Graham Bird by 1,878 votes. The Liberal candidate, radio call-in show host Lowell Green, came in third. Gigantes was re-elected over Bird by an increased margin in the 1985 provincial election.

After the 1985 election, the Liberal Party under David Peterson was able to form a minority administration with support from the NDP (which did not join the Liberals in a formal coalition, but offered support on key legislative initiatives). Gigantes served as her party's critic for the Attorney General and for Women's Issues in this period. In November 1986, Gigantes proposed a gay rights amendment to a bill that sought to bring Ontario statutes into line with the new Canadian Charter of Rights and Freedoms. Her amendment proposed to protect gays from being discriminated against based on their sexual orientation. The bill, including her contentious amendment, was passed a month later by a vote of 64–45. At the same time during debate on another bill about pay equity, Gigantes was expelled from the legislature for calling Attorney General Ian Scott a liar.

The Liberals won a majority government in the 1987 provincial election, and Gigantes lost her seat to Liberal Richard Patten by 1,087 votes. Between 1987 and 1990, she worked as a union representative for the National Union of Provincial Government Employees.

=== In government ===
The NDP won a majority government under Bob Rae in the 1990 provincial election, and Gigantes, once again campaigning in Ottawa Centre, defeated Patten by almost 3,000 votes. Gigantes remarked during the election campaign that the Liberals, who were widely seen as leading in the polls, were not in control of events. She said, "The election call has triggered a very cold look at the record of this government and people don't like what they see."

As a result of her legislative experience, she was appointed to Rae's first cabinet as Minister of Health on October 1, 1990. In June 1990, the federal government narrowly passed bill C-43 which would have placed restrictions on doctors who performed abortions. In response to the bill, many Ontario doctors decided to stop performing abortions altogether. In November 1990, Gigantes announced that the province would set up fully funded free-standing abortion clinics to ensure that abortion services remained available. In January 1991, Gigantes and fellow cabinet minister Anne Swarbrick led a delegation that appeared before the legal affairs committee of the Senate of Canada that was discussing the bill. Eventually, the bill was defeated on a tie vote in the Senate and the federal government never reintroduced the legislation.

On April 19, 1991, Gigantes resigned from cabinet after inadvertently revealing the name of a Toronto man who had been sent to the United States for drug treatment that wasn't offered in the province. Three months later, she was reinstated to cabinet as Minister of Housing.

During her time as housing minister, Gigantes proposed that apartments within houses, referred to as "granny-flats", would be legalized and protected. The legislation eventually called the Residents' Rights Act was passed into law in the summer of 1994. The bill removed the ability of municipalities to ban so-called basement apartments and sought to improve the safety of tenants by giving them the ability to complain about landlords. In August 1994, Gigantes resigned from cabinet when she was found in breach of conflict-of-interest guidelines. Gigantes resigned because she allegedly pressured an Ottawa tenant to drop charges against the board members of her public housing project. The committee found that the breach was minor but had "the potential to diminish the public's trust."

The NDP were defeated in the 1995 provincial election and Gigantes again lost the Ottawa Centre riding to Richard Patten by over 1,500 votes.

== Later life and death ==
In 2004, Gigantes co-chaired a candidate search committee for the federal New Democratic Party.

Gigantes died on January 16, 2026, at the age of 83. Ontario NDP leader Marit Stiles paid tribute to her as a "force of nature", saying, "Her courage and her refusal to stay quiet made a real difference in this province that we still feel today."

== Cabinet posts ==
Rae ministry, Province of Ontario (1990–1995)
Cabinet posts (2)
Predecessor	Office	Successor
Dave Cooke	Minister of Housing; 1991–1994	Richard Allen
Elinor Caplan	Minister of Health; 1990–1991	Frances Lankin
