= 1978 Ontario New Democratic Party leadership election =

- February 5, 1978
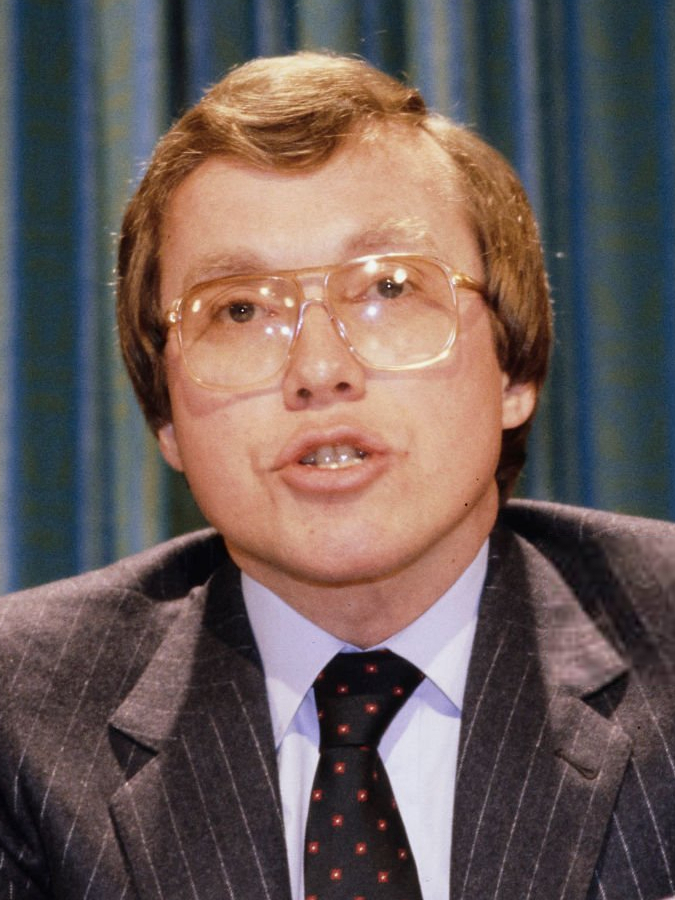

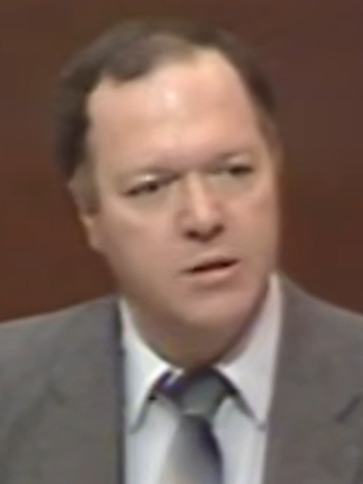
Candidate	Michael Cassidy	Ian Deans	Michael Breaugh
Riding	Ottawa Centre	Wentworth	Oshawa
Final ballot	980 (54.78%)	809 (45.22%)	Eliminated
First ballot	675 (37.56%)	623 (34.67%)	499 (27.77%)
Leader before election
Stephen Lewis
Elected Leader
Michael Cassidy

1978 Ontario New Democratic Party leadership election
- Date: February 5, 1978
- Convention: Sheraton Centre; Toronto, Ontario
- Resigning leader: Stephen Lewis
- Won by: Michael Cassidy
- Ballots: 2
- Candidates: 3

The 1978 Ontario New Democratic Party leadership election was held in Toronto, Ontario, on February 5, 1978, to elect a successor to Stephen Lewis as leader of the Ontario New Democratic Party (NDP). The convention was necessary because Lewis resigned after the party performed poorly in the 1977 Ontario provincial election, where they had dropped to third place in the Legislative Assembly of Ontario. Michael Cassidy won on the second ballot, defeating Ian Deans.

== Background ==
In the lead-up to the leadership election, Ian Deans was perceived as the frontrunner. He enjoyed the most support from the Ontario New Democratic caucus, and had a commanding lead in an unofficial poll of delegates taken just days before the vote.

Michael Breaugh had less support from New Democratic politicians than Deans, but enjoyed the support of then federal New Democratic Party leader Ed Broadbent.

Cassidy was generally considered the most left-wing candidate. His policy advisor in the leadership campaign was James Laxer, a former leader of The Waffle, a faction which had separated from the New Democratic Party in 1974.

Cassidy's victory was seen as an upset, and marked an ideological shift to the left for the party. Deans later attributed his defeat to weak support from labour unions.

== Candidates ==
=== Michael Breaugh ===
Michael Breaugh was the Member of Provincial Parliament (MPP) for Oshawa. He was first elected in the 1975 provincial election. Previously, he was member of Oshawa City Council from 1973 to 1975. Before entering politics, he was a teacher.

Endorsements

- MPs: (1) Ed Broadbent (Oshawa)

=== Michael Cassidy ===
Michael Cassidy was the Member of Provincial Parliament (MPP) for Ottawa Centre. He was first elected in the 1971 provincial election. Previously, he was member of Ottawa City Council, representing Wellington Ward from 1970 to 1972. Before entering politics, he was a journalist, serving as bureau chief of the Financial Times in Ottawa.

Endorsements

- Other prominent individuals: (1) James Laxer

=== Ian Deans ===
Ian Deans was the Member of Provincial Parliament (MPP) for Wentworth. He was first elected in the 1975 provincial election. Before entering politics, he was a firefighter.

Endorsements

- MPPs: (15) Ted Bounsall (Windsor—Sandwich), Brian Charlton (Hamilton Mountain), Dave Cooke (Windsor—Riverside), Monty Davidson (Cambridge), Michael Davison (Hamilton Centre), Bud Germa (Sudbury), Donald C. MacDonald (York South), Bob Mackenzie (Hamilton East), Mac Makarchuk (Brantford), Elie Martel (Sudbury East), Ross McClellan (Bellwoods), Ed Philip (Etobicoke), George Samis (Cornwall), Mel Swart (Welland), Fred Young (Yorkview)

== Voting results ==
= Eliminated from next round
= Winner

Delegate support by ballot
Candidate	1st Ballot		2nd Ballot		
Name	Votes	%	Votes	%	+/− (pp)
Michael Cassidy	675	37.6	980	54.8	+17.2
Ian Deans	623	34.7	809	45.2	+10.5
Michael Breaugh	499	27.8	Eliminated (endorsed Cassidy)		
Total	1,797	100.0	1,789	100.0	-8
