= Yasir Naqvi =

Canadian politician (born 1973)

The Honourable Yasir Naqvi ECO MP
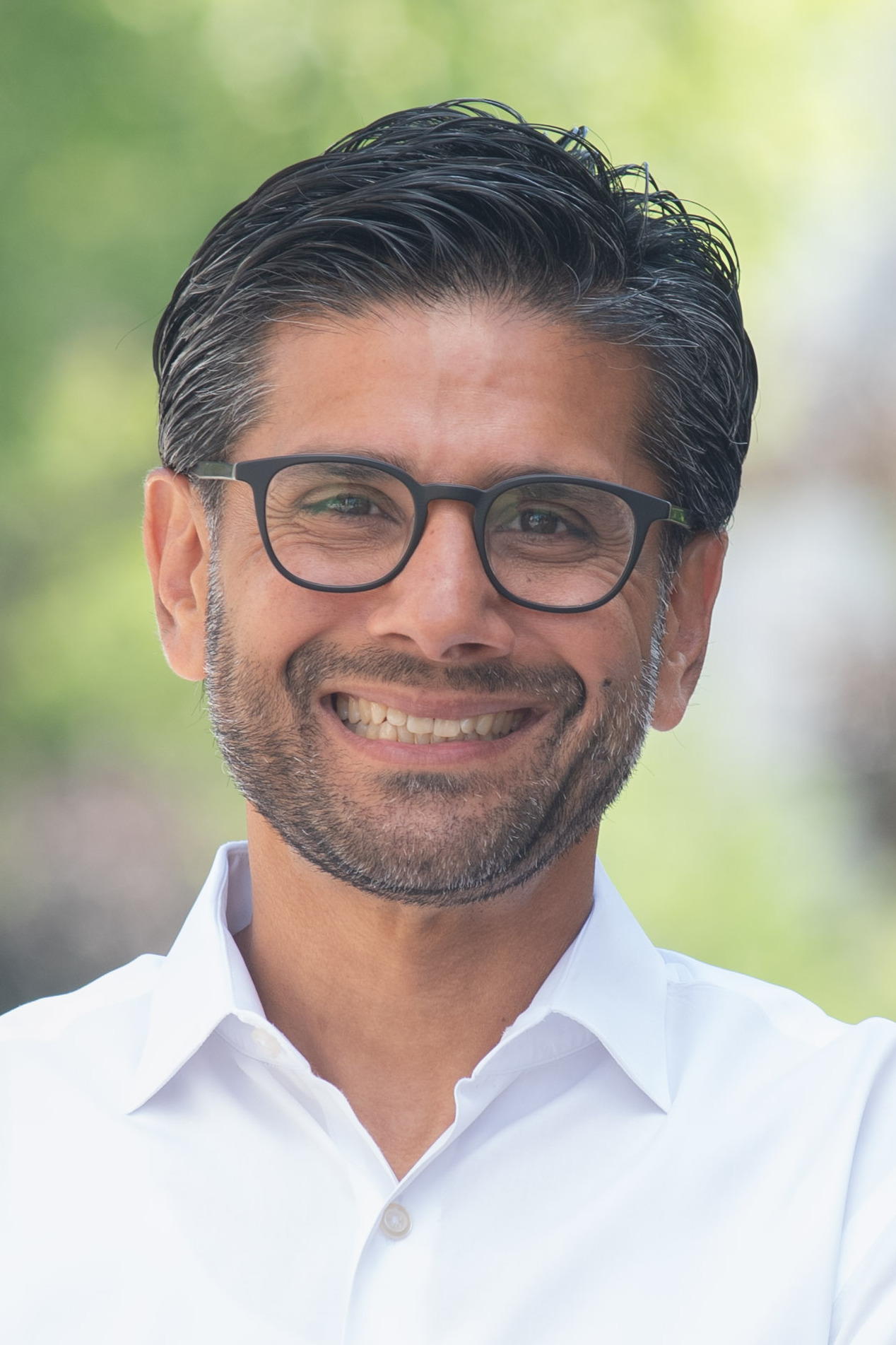
- Naqvi in 2021

Member of Parliament for Ottawa Centre
- Incumbent
- Assumed office 20 September 2021
- Preceded by: Catherine McKenna

39th Attorney General of Ontario
- In office 13 June 2016 – 29 June 2018
- Premier: Kathleen Wynne
- Preceded by: Madeleine Meilleur
- Succeeded by: Caroline Mulroney

Member of the Provincial Parliament for Ottawa Centre
- In office 10 October 2007 – 6 June 2018
- Preceded by: Richard Patten
- Succeeded by: Joel Harden

Personal details
- Born: Yasir Abbas Naqvi; 25 January 1973 (age 53) Karachi, Pakistan
- Party: Liberal
- Other political affiliations: Ontario Liberal
- Children: 2
- Education: McMaster University (BA, BSc), University of Ottawa (LLB), Carleton University (MA), Rotman School of Management
- Occupation: Lawyer; politician

Yasir Abbas Naqvi ECO MPP (born 25 January 1973) is a Canadian politician who has served as the member of Parliament (MP) for Ottawa Centre since the 2021 federal election, sitting as a Liberal. Prior to his election to the House of Commons of Canada, Naqvi was active in Ontario provincial politics, serving as the first visible-minority attorney general of Ontario (2016–2018), minister of community safety and correctional services (2014–2016), and minister of labour (2013–2014). He represented Ottawa Centre in the Legislative Assembly. On 3 June 2023, Naqvi announced his candidacy for the 2023 Ontario Liberal Party leadership election. He placed third, losing to Bonnie Crombie.

== Background ==
Naqvi was born and raised in Karachi, Pakistan and immigrated to Canada with his family after his father was jailed for nine months for leading a pro-democracy demonstration. His family moved to the United Kingdom, settling in London for a short time.

In 1988, at the age of 15, Naqvi settled in Niagara Falls, Ontario with his family where they bought a motel. Naqvi attended McMaster University and graduated with a degree in Political Science and Life Science.

Just two years after arriving in Canada, Naqvi volunteered in the 1990 provincial election. He has been involved with the Liberal Party of Canada and the Liberal Party of Ontario ever since.

He went on to attend the University of Ottawa Law School and was called to the Bar in Ontario in 2001. He began practicing in international trade law at Flavell Kubrick LLP, where he eventually became a partner.

He left Flavell Kubrick in 2005 to work for Land Michener LLP. In 2007, Naqvi joined the Centre for Trade Policy and Law at Carleton University. He also served as President of the Liberal Party of Ontario from October 2009 until February 2013.

The Ottawa Citizen named Naqvi as one of its "People to Watch in 2010", with a profile in the 9 January 2010 Saturday Observer headlined "Yasir Naqvi, he's a firecracker". Ottawa Life magazine also included him in its Tenth Annual "Top 50 People in the Capital" list for 2010. In a September 2011 column, Adam Radwanski of The Globe and Mail called Naqvi "possibly the hardest-working constituency MPP in the province."

Naqvi was also recognized by Carleton University in 2017 as part of their 75 for the 75th series, which highlighted 75 notable alumni in the Faculty of Public Affairs in honour of the University's 75th anniversary.

Prior to entering politics he volunteered with a number of community associations including the Centretown Community Health Centre and the Ottawa Food Bank.

== Political career ==
=== Ontario provincial politics ===
The Ontario Liberal Party nomination in the riding of Ottawa Centre was opened up in March 2007 when incumbent MPP and Peterson era cabinet minister Richard Patten announced that he would not seek re-election. Naqvi competed against long time Ottawa City Councillor Diane Deans, who was backed by the central party and endorsed by Patten, for the nomination. In the general election, he defeated New Democratic Party (NDP) candidate Will Murray by 2,094 votes. He was successful in seeking re-election in both in 2011 and 2014.

He was appointed Parliamentary Assistant to Rick Bartolucci, the Minister of Community Safety and Correctional Services, in the cabinet announcement of 30 October 2007. On 3 October 2008, he was named Parliamentary Assistant to the Minister of Revenue Dwight Duncan. On 24 June 2009, a cabinet shuffle moved John Wilkinson into the role of Minister of Revenue and Naqvi was kept on as his Parliamentary Assistant. On 2 September 2010, Naqvi was appointed Parliamentary Assistant to Minister of Education Leona Dombrowsky.

Naqvi introduced six Private Member's Bills – the "Safer Communities and Neighbourhoods Act", the "City of Ottawa Amendment Act", the "Escaping Domestic Violence Act", the "College and University Student Associations Act", the "Enhancing Red Light Camera System Enforcement Act", and the "Protection of Public Participation Act". Parts of the City of Ottawa Amendment Act were passed as part of the 2010 budget and parts of the Escaping Domestic Violence Act were passed in March 2016 as part of the Sexual Violence and Harassment Action Plan Act. On 17 September 2009, Naqvi introduced a co-sponsored notion with NDP member of Provincial Parliament (MPP) France Gélinas declaring the third week of February "Kindness Week", inspired by a successful Kindness Week initiative underway in Ottawa. Naqvi also co-sponsored Toby's Act with NDP MPP France Gelinas and Progressive Conservative (PC) MPP Christine Elliott which added gender identity and gender expression to the Ontario Human Rights Code.

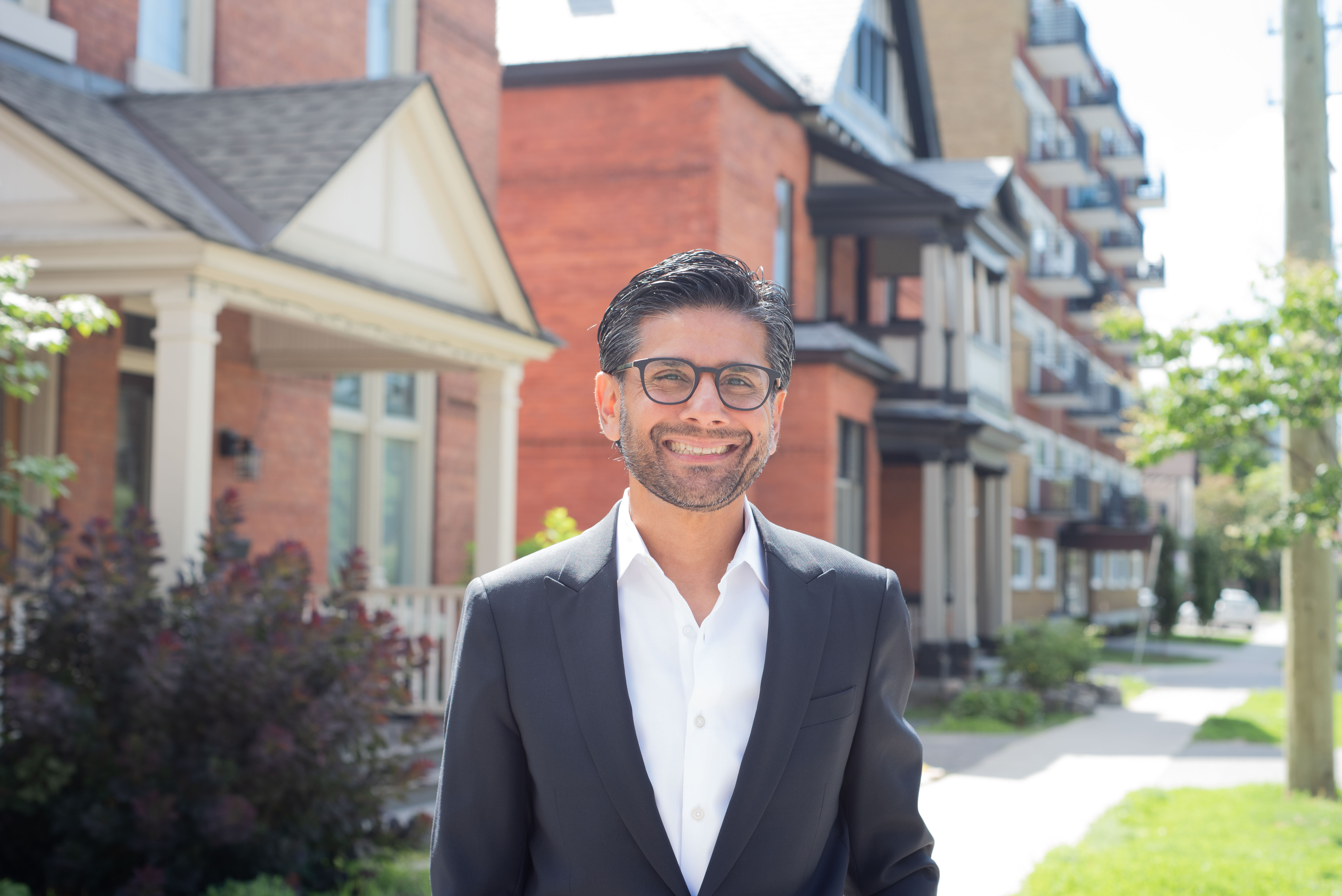
Yasir Naqvi in 2021

In March 2013, an article appeared in the Toronto Sun which claimed that Naqvi had endorsed an Islamist book on men physically punishing their wives. The following day in the National Post, Naqvi denied having endorsed the book. The Post reported that "Naqvi acknowledged that he wrote a letter of support for the book two years ago, but says he didn't read it…. The minister says he also didn't authorize the use of his name or comments in the "reviews" section of the book." Naqvi said that he wrote a congratulatory note to the author for the publication but had not read the book nor endorsed the messaging within it. He also made a statement where he strongly condemned violence against women and stated, "I believe that abuse of any kind is unacceptable and I do not share the views expressed in this book". In February 2013, when Kathleen Wynne took over as Premier, she appointed Naqvi to her first cabinet as Minister of Labour. After the June 2014 election, Naqvi was moved to the position of Minister of Community Safety and Correctional Services and Government House Leader. In 2016, Naqvi and the Ontario Government were criticized for the state of provincial prisons and the human rights violations of inmates.

Attorney General

On 13 June 2016, he assumed the role of Attorney General following a cabinet shuffle, becoming both the first visible-minority and the first Muslim person to do so.

As Attorney General of Ontario, Naqvi introduced the Safe Access to Abortion Services Act, 2017. This bill created Safe access zones for abortion clinics and health-care facilities in Ontario, making it illegal to advise a person not to access abortion services, videotape or photograph a patient or provider for the purpose of discouraging them from abortion services and perform acts of disapproval about issues relating to abortion by any means. These safe access zones are in effect within 50m of abortion clinics and 150m of hospitals or offices of healthcare professionals that provide abortion services.

In a 2018 article naming him one of the 25 Most Influential in the Justice System and Legal Profession, Naqvi was "credited by voters as pulling Ontario's court system into the future with his Digital Justice Action Plan, putting wireless internet in courtrooms, instituting the use of email and text for jury summons, as well as initiating a 2017 website that digitized the filing of civil claims."

Naqvi unsuccessfully sought a fourth mandate in the June 2018 Ontario general election. He came in second behind New Democrat Joel Harden.

In his brief time away from politics, Naqvi was appointed CEO of the Institute for Canadian Citizenship (ICC).

=== Federal politics ===
Naqvi was elected for the Liberal Party of Canada in Ottawa-Centre on 20 September 2021, handily winning his seat with 45.5% of the popular vote. He was chosen to serve as Parliamentary Secretary to the President of the King's Privy Council for Canada and Minister of Emergency Preparedness.

As a Member of Parliament, Naqvi has served on the Canadian House of Commons Standing Committee on Justice and Human Rights (JUST) as well as on the Special Joint Committee on the Declaration of Emergency (DEDC).

In July 2022, Naqvi announced the creation of the Downtown Ottawa Revitalization Task Force to explore ideas and create recommendations that will assist policymakers in the reimagining of downtown Ottawa.

Naqvi was "disappointed" regarding the reopening of Wellington Road, in front of the Parliament of Canada, citing this would result in having cars and buses return to the street, even though the City of Ottawa planned bicycle lanes, further enhancing commuting. He indicated that he preferred having "conversations" to find a good result for Wellington Street.

Naqvi resigned from his role as a Parliamentary Secretary in March 2023 as he began seriously considering running in the 2023 Ontario Liberal Party leadership election. He officially announced his candidacy on 3 June 2023 while continuing to sit as a federal MP.

=== Ontario Liberal leadership campaign ===
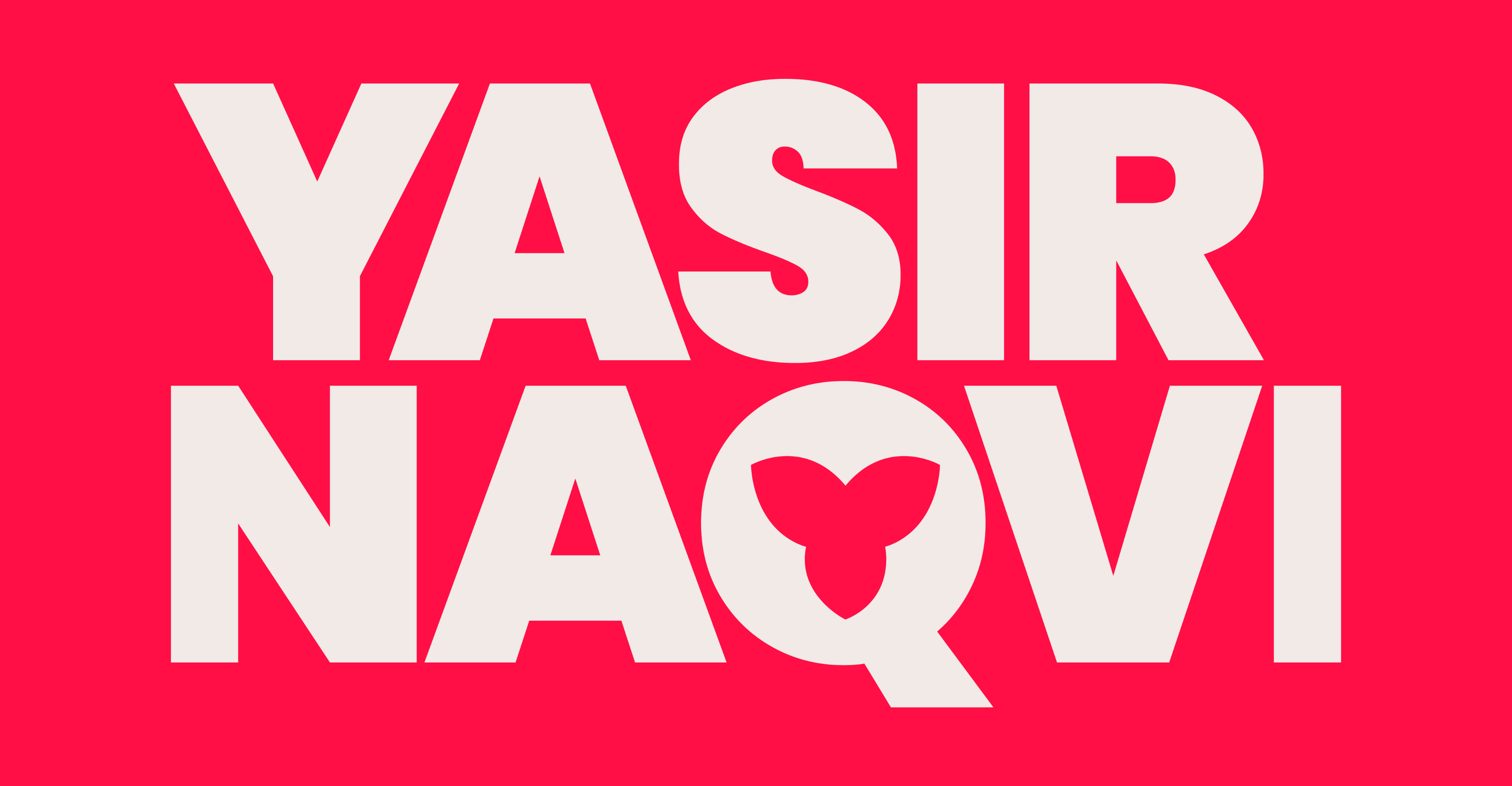
Yasir Naqvi Campaign Logo

Naqvi returned to the provincial scene in 2023 running for the leadership of the Ontario Liberal Party, while remaining a federal MP. He placed third in the 2023 Ontario Liberal Party leadership election behind Mississauga mayor Bonnie Crombie, who won the vote, and runner-up Nathaniel Erskine-Smith.

== Personal life ==
Naqvi was married and has a son and a daughter. They live in Ottawa. Naqvi's older brother, Ali Naqvi, was a candidate for the New Democratic Party in the riding of Mississauga East—Cooksville in the 2015 Canadian federal election, and in the riding of Etobicoke North in the 2008 Canadian federal election and 2006 Canadian federal election, and in the riding of Don Valley West in the 2003 Ontario general election. Naqvi's father Anwar Naqvi was a candidate for the New Democratic Party in the riding of Halton in the 2006 Canadian federal election and the 2004 Canadian federal election, and in the riding of Oakville in the 2003 Ontario general election.

== Electoral record ==
=== Federal elections ===
2025 Canadian federal election: Ottawa Centre
| Party | Candidate | Votes | % | ±% | Expenditures |
|---|---|---|---|---|---|
| Liberal | Yasir Naqvi | 51,026 | 62.73 | +17.50 | $145,082.19 |
| New Democratic | Joel Harden | 15,935 | 19.59 | –13.12 | $140,977.79 |
| Conservative | Paul D'Orsonnens | 12,692 | 15.60 | –0.68 | $80,223.66 |
| Green | Amanda Rosenstock | 916 | 1.13 | –1.67 | $13,758.70 |
| Canadian Future | Andrea Chabot | 268 | 0.33 | N/A | $17,715.43 |
| Christian Heritage | Marie-Chantal Leriche | 234 | 0.29 | N/A | $0.00 |
| Communist | Cashton Perry | 154 | 0.19 | –0.09 | $0.00 |
| Independent | Mike Salmon | 66 | 0.08 | N/A | $0.00 |
| Independent | Zed Chebib | 47 | 0.06 | N/A | none listed |
| Total valid votes | | 81,338 | 99.26 | –0.05 | $149,828.93 |
| Total rejected ballots | | 604 | 0.74 | +0.05 | |
| Turnout | | 81,942 | 77.43 | +2.99 | |
| Eligible voters | | 105,823 | | | |
| Liberal notional hold | | Swing | | +15.31 | |
Source: Elections Canada

2021 Canadian federal election: Ottawa Centre
| Party | Candidate | Votes | % | ±% | Expenditures |
|---|---|---|---|---|---|
| Liberal | Yasir Naqvi | 33,825 | 45.50 | –3.16 | $123,140.48 |
| New Democratic | Angella MacEwen | 24,552 | 33.03 | +3.99 | $119,016.95 |
| Conservative | Carol Clemenhagen | 11,650 | 15.67 | +3.10 | $87,213.88 |
| Green | Angela Keller-Herzog | 2,115 | 2.84 | –4.56 | $34,113.84 |
| People's | Regina Watteel | 1,605 | 2.16 | +1.25 | $8,682.43 |
| Animal Protection | Shelby Bertrand | 261 | 0.35 | +0.09 | $3,741.29 |
| Communist | Alex McDonald | 201 | 0.27 | +0.13 | $0.00 |
| Independent | Rich Joyal | 132 | 0.18 | - | none listed |
| Total valid votes/expense limit | | 74,341 | – | – | $124,204.20 |
| Total valid votes | | 74,341 | | | |
| Total rejected ballots | | 497 | | | |
| Turnout | | 74,838 | 77.17 | | |
| Eligible voters | | 96,979 | | | |
| Liberal hold | | Swing | | –3.58 | |
Source: Elections Canada

=== Provincial elections ===
2018 Ontario general election: Ottawa Centre
| Party | Candidate | Votes | % | ±% |
|---|---|---|---|---|
| New Democratic | Joel Harden | 29,675 | 46.08 | +25.61 |
| Liberal | Yasir Naqvi | 21,111 | 32.78 | –19.24 |
| Progressive Conservative | Colleen McCleery | 10,327 | 16.03 | –2.15 |
| Green | Cherie Wong | 2,266 | 3.52 | –4.30 |
| None of the Above | Marc Adornato | 437 | 0.68 | – |
| Libertarian | Bruce A. Faulkner | 385 | 0.60 | –0.39 |
| Communist | Stuart Ryan | 110 | 0.17 | –0.36 |
| Canadians' Choice | James Sears | 92 | 0.14 | – |
| Total valid votes | | 64,403 | 99.08 | |
| Total rejected, unmarked and declined ballots | | 601 | 0.92 | –0.27 |
| Turnout | | 65,004 | 61.20 | +4.36 |
| Eligible voters | | 106,208 | | |
| New Democratic gain from Liberal | | Swing | | +22.42 |
Source: Elections Ontario

2014 Ontario general election: Ottawa Centre
| Party | Candidate | Votes | % | ±% |
|---|---|---|---|---|
| Liberal | Yasir Naqvi | 27,689 | 52.02 | +5.20 |
| New Democratic | Jennifer McKenzie | 10,894 | 20.47 | –8.67 |
| Progressive Conservative | Rob Dekker | 9,678 | 18.18 | –0.15 |
| Green | Kevin O'Donnell | 4,163 | 7.82 | +3.50 |
| Libertarian | Bruce A. Faulkner | 525 | 0.99 | +0.51 |
| Communist | Larry L. Wasslen | 283 | 0.53 | +0.21 |
| Total valid votes | | 53,232 | 98.80 | |
| Total rejected, unmarked and declined ballots | | 646 | 1.20 | +0.63 |
| Turnout | | 53,878 | 56.85 | +3.12 |
| Eligible voters | | 94,777 | | |
| Liberal hold | | Swing | | +6.93 |
Source: Elections Ontario

2011 Ontario general election: Ottawa Centre
| Party | Candidate | Votes | % | ±% | Expenditures |
|---|---|---|---|---|---|
| Liberal | Yasir Naqvi | 23,646 | 46.81 | +11.90 | $102,168.00 |
| New Democratic | Anil Naidoo | 14,715 | 29.13 | –1.77 | $83,779.02 |
| Progressive Conservative | Rob Dekker | 9,257 | 18.33 | –1.59 | $27,933.58 |
| Green | Kevin O'Donnell | 2,184 | 4.32 | –8.03 | $5,902.64 |
| Independent | Kristina Chapman | 309 | 0.61 | – | $3,418.00 |
| Libertarian | Michael Zeithammel | 240 | 0.48 | – | $0 |
| Communist | Stuart Ryan | 160 | 0.32 | –0.07 | $394.11 |
| Total valid votes/expense limit | | 50,511 | 99.43 | – | $112,575.19 |
| Total rejected, unmarked and declined ballots | | 290 | 0.57 | –0.12 | |
| Turnout | | 50,801 | 53.73 | –4.52 | |
| Eligible voters | | 94,553 | | | |
| Liberal hold | | Swing | | +6.84 | |
Source: Elections Ontario

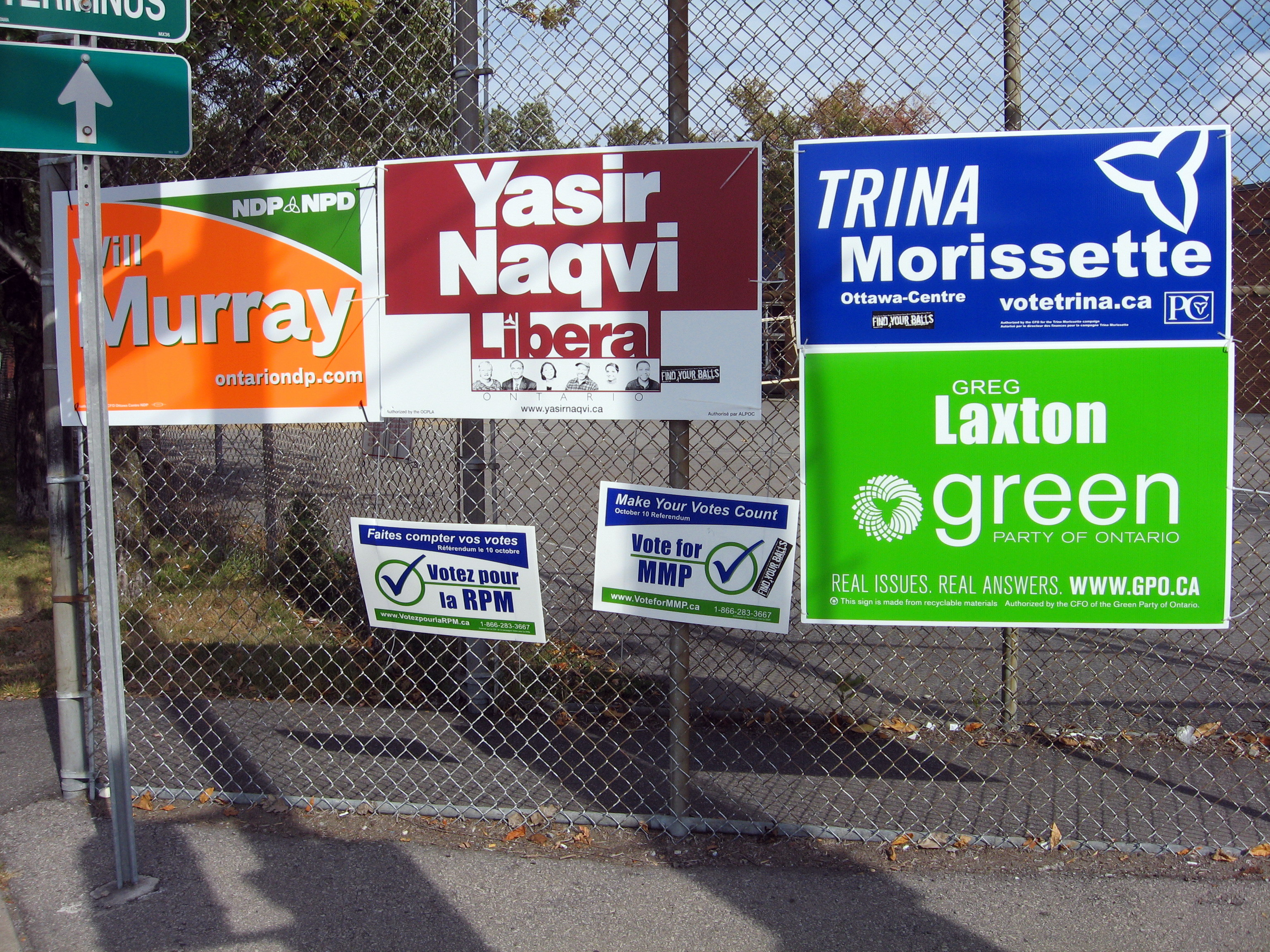
Election signs for the major party Ottawa Centre candidates during the 2007 election

2007 Ontario general election: Ottawa Centre
| Party | Candidate | Votes | % | ±% | Expenditures |
|---|---|---|---|---|---|
| Liberal | Yasir Naqvi | 18,255 | 34.91 | –10.19 | $74,103.43 |
| New Democratic | Will Murray | 16,161 | 30.90 | +7.92 | $76,746.81 |
| Progressive Conservative | Trina Morissette | 10,416 | 19.92 | –2.77 | $41,039.06 |
| Green | Greg Laxton | 6,458 | 12.35 | +4.62 | $9,967.33 |
| Family Coalition | Danny Moran | 516 | 0.99 | – | $627.00 |
| Independent | Richard Eveleigh | 283 | 0.54 | – | $70.00 |
| Communist | Stuart Ryan | 204 | 0.39 | –0.23 | $928.61 |
| Total valid votes/expense limit | | 52,293 | 99.31 | – | $97,635.24 |
| Total rejected, unmarked and declined ballots | | 366 | 0.70 | –0.03 | |
| Turnout | | 52,659 | 58.25 | +2.62 | |
| Eligible voters | | 90,403 | | | |
| Liberal hold | | Swing | | –9.06 | |
Source: Elections Ontario

Wynne ministry, Province of Ontario (2013–2018)
Cabinet posts (3)
| Predecessor | Office | Successor |
|---|---|---|
| Madeleine Meilleur | Attorney General; 2016–2018 | Caroline Mulroney |
| Madeleine Meilleur | Minister of Community Safety and Correctional Services; 2014–2016 | David Orazietti |
| Linda Jeffrey | Minister of Labour; 2013–2014 | Kevin Flynn |
Special Parliamentary Responsibilities
| Predecessor | Title | Successor |
| John Milloy | Government House Leader; 2014–2018 | Todd Smith |
