= Katharine Gibbs (disambiguation) =

Katherine, Katharine, Katie , or Katy Gibbs may refer to:

- Katie Gibbs, Canadian politician
- Katharine Gibbs, founder of Gibbs College
- Kay Francis, actress born "Katharine Gibbs"
