= Stand Up For Science =

Stand Up For Science or Stand Up for Science may refer to:

- A 2006 Discovery Institute intelligent design campaign.
- A series of 2013 Canadian protests organised by Evidence For Democracy.
- Stand Up for Science 2025, a series of 2025 American protests.
