= James Sears =

Canadian neo-Nazi and convicted criminal

- Born: Dimitrious Sarafopoulos; September 14, 1963 (age 63)
- Other name: "Dimitri the Lover"
- Occupation: Physician (license revoked)
- Political party: New Constitution
- Other political affiliations: Canadians' Choice
- Movement: Neo-Nazism
- Status: Released
- Convictions: 2 counts of willful promotion of hate
- Criminal charge: Violation of parole
- Penalty: 1 year in prison (6 months each count, served consecutively)

Details
- Date apprehended: Surrendered for incarceration on June 14, 2021

James Nicholas Sears (born Dimitrious Sarafopoulos; September 14, 1963) is a Canadian neo-Nazi who was convicted of willful promotion of hatred in 2019.

Sears was the editor of a misogynist and antisemitic tabloid promoting his own New Constitution Party. The newspaper, titled Your Ward News, was barred from distribution by Canada Post in 2016, and Sears was convicted of willful promotion of hate on January 24, 2019. He was sentenced to imprisonment for one year on August 22, 2019. On August 27, 2019, Sears was released on bail pending the hearing of his appeal. On June 14, 2021, his appeal was denied and his one-year prison sentence began. He was released on parole on October 14, 2021, and was arrested again for violating his parole conditions on February 3, 2022.

== Medical and military background ==
Sears was trained as a physician and described himself as a retired Canadian Armed Forces Medical Officer (Captain). In the 1980s he was a medical student with the Canadian Armed Forces and graduated in 1988. During his subsequent internship, he was judged "immature" and entered psychotherapy in 1990. Following complaints from female patients, Sears' medical licence was revoked by the College of Physicians and Surgeons of Ontario in 1992 after Sears pleaded guilty to two counts of sexual assault.

Sears started the Second Opinion Medical-Legal Consultants Group in 1994, offering "medical investigative services" such as medical background checks for the prospective employees of its clients and research for parties to medical malpractice suits. In 2001, it was reported in the Toronto Star that they had been hired by Canadian Tire and the Toronto Transit Commission.

== Mortgage broker ==
Sears claimed as of 2005 to be the co-owner of Toronto mortgage broker Trillium Mortgage. In 2014, in campaign materials supporting his run for Toronto city council, In an article describing hate mail allegedly sent from Your Ward News to Toronto city councillor Kristyn Wong-Tam, Torontoist reported that as of 2015 Sears was merely an employee of the brokerage.

== Pickup artist ==
Sears was also known for his activities as a pickup artist. Using the pseudonym "Dimitri the Lover", he would sell courses that claimed to train men in how to seduce women. A voicemail purported to be training material from his courses regularly makes its way around the internet.

== Your Ward News ==
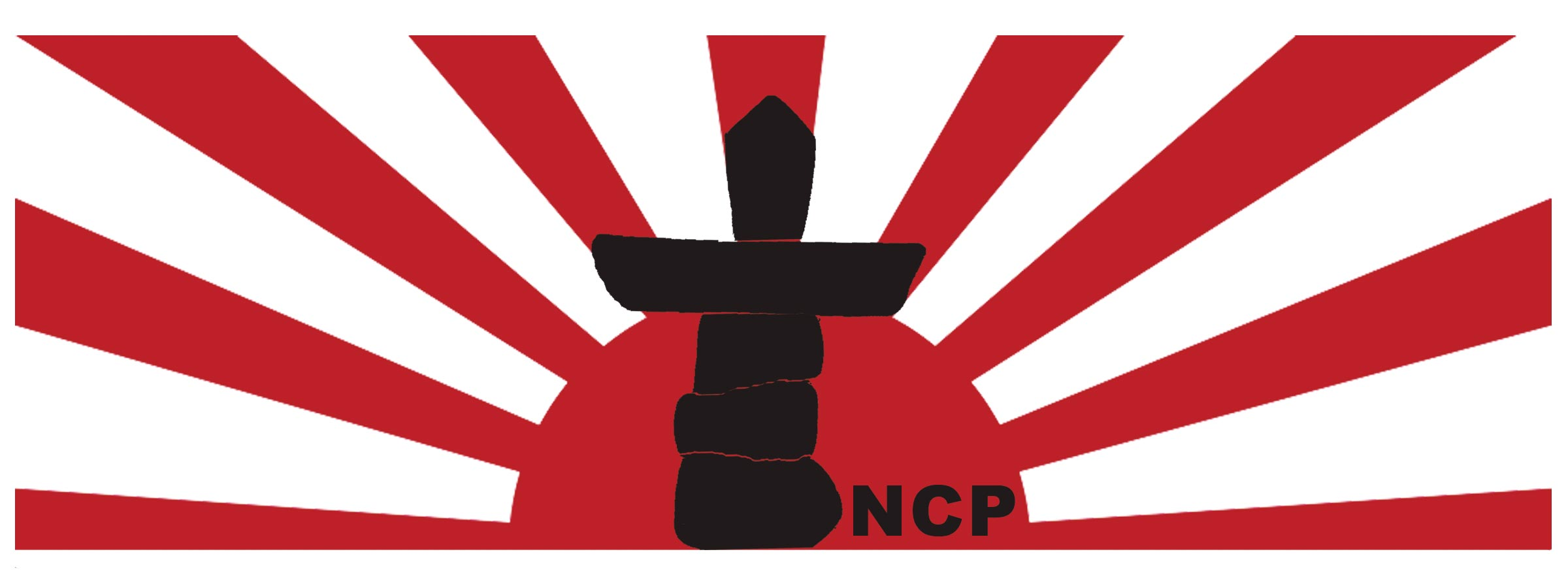
Logo of the New Constitution Party

Sears is editor-in-chief of Your Ward News, a quarterly newspaper which promotes the New Constitution Party, an unregistered neo-Nazi political party led by Sears. The newspaper used to be printed and distributed as a flyer in the east Toronto neighbourhood of The Beaches. The vanity publication, which claimed to have a circulation of 50,000, was criticized for using antisemitic caricatures and language, described by former Canadian Jewish Congress Chief Executive Officer Bernie Farber as "classic anti-Semitic tropes" and "a clear attempt at a hateful representation of Jews". On June 6, 2016, the Government of Canada ordered Canada Post to cease delivery of the paper.

The newspaper continued to be distributed using private delivery services, and was investigated for hate crime. On June 21, 2017, Sears and publisher Leroy St. Germaine were charged under the Criminal Code with uttering threats against Warren and Lisa Kinsella in an article by Sears in which he wrote that his supporters may decide to "bludgeon the Kinsellas to death."

In November 2017, Sears and St. Germaine were each charged with two counts of willful promotion of hatred under the Criminal Code. They were accused of promoting hatred against women and Jews. Both were found guilty on January 24, 2019. The Crown asked that Sears be given a one-year jail sentence and an additional three years' probation during which Sears would be prohibited from publishing any material. On August 22, 2019, Sears was sentenced to one year's imprisonment, consisting of six months for each charge, served consecutively, the maximum sentence available. On August 29, 2019, St. Germaine was sentenced to one year of house arrest. While Sears and St. Germaine appealed the verdict, suggesting that their counsel was incompetent, a judge denied their appeal on June 14, 2021, sustaining the lower court's sentences. Sears was ordered to surrender himself that afternoon to begin serving his sentence.

After being released on parole in 2021, Sears accepted a "free speech award" from white supremacist Paul Fromm. In his videotaped acceptance speech, Sears theorized about the handling of the COVID-19 pandemic in Canada "if the Nazis were in charge", and called for the public execution of Chief Public Health Officer Theresa Tam. Sears was arrested again on February 3, 2022, for violating his parole conditions.

== Political candidacies ==
In the 2014 Toronto civic election, Sears was a city council candidate in Ward 32 and received 797 votes (roughly 3% of the vote). His campaign included a website with an interactive animation that asked users to choose one of three playable characters, Rob Ford, Vladimir Putin or Adolf Hitler to "spank" the bare bottom of a cartoon caricature of city councillor Mary-Margaret McMahon, Sears's rival in the election.

He ran in the 2015 federal election as an independent candidate (no party affiliation) and placed fifth out of seven candidates, getting 254 votes (less than 0.5% of the vote).

Sears was a candidate for the Canadians' Choice Party in the 2018 provincial election running against Attorney General Yasir Naqvi in Ottawa Centre. He placed last out of eight candidates with 92 votes.

In 2018, he registered as a candidate for Mayor of Toronto in that year's election. He finished with 680 votes, less than 1% of the total vote.

=== Electoral record ===
2014 Toronto election, Ward 32
Candidate	Votes	%
Mary-Margaret McMahon	15,762	60.92
Sandra Bussin	4,552	17.59
Brian Graff	1,922	7.43
James Sears	797	3.08
Eric de Boer	677	2.62
Carmel Suttor	464	1.79
Alan Burke	404	1.56
Maria Garcia	402	1.55
Michael Connor	334	1.29
Sean Dawson	241	0.93
Bruce Baker	213	0.82
Jim Brookman	107	0.41
Total	25,875	100%

2015 Canadian federal election: Beaches—East York
Party	Candidate	Votes	%	±%	Expenditures
Liberal	Nate Erskine-Smith	27,458	49.45	+18.69	$104,089.50
New Democratic	Matthew Kellway	17,113	30.82	-10.82	$129,211.99
Conservative	Bill Burrows	9,124	16.43	-6.31	$35,453.04
Green	Randall Sach	1,433	2.58	-2.02	$3,691.94
Independent	James Sears	254	0.46	–	$35,400.00
Marxist–Leninist	Roger Carter	105	0.19	-0.08	–
Independent	Peter Surjanac	43	0.08	–	$449.62
Total valid votes/expense limit		55,530	99.61		$208,561.84
Total rejected ballots		216	0.39	-0.01	
Turnout		55,746	71.99	+5.33	
Eligible voters		77,440			
Liberal gain from New Democratic		Swing		+14.76	
Source: Elections Canada

2018 Ontario general election: Ottawa Centre
Party	Candidate	Votes	%	±%
New Democratic	Joel Harden	29,675	46.08	+25.61
Liberal	Yasir Naqvi	21,111	32.78	–19.24
Progressive Conservative	Colleen McCleery	10,327	16.03	–2.15
Green	Cherie Wong	2,266	3.52	–4.30
None of the Above	Marc Adornato	437	0.68	–
Libertarian	Bruce A. Faulkner	385	0.60	–0.39
Communist	Stuart Ryan	110	0.17	–0.36
Canadians' Choice	James Sears	92	0.14	–
Total valid votes		64,403	99.08	
Total rejected, unmarked and declined ballots		601	0.92	–0.27
Turnout		65,004	61.20	+4.36
Eligible voters		106,208		
New Democratic gain from Liberal		Swing		+22.42
Source: Elections Ontario
