= Ottawa Centre =

Ottawa Centre may refer to:

- Ottawa Centre (federal electoral district)
- Ottawa Centre (provincial electoral district)
