= Adornato =

Adornato is an Italian surname. Notable people with the surname include:

- Ferdinando Adornato (born 1954), Italian politician and journalist
- Marc Adornato (born 1977), Canadian artist
