= Joel Harden =

Canadian politician

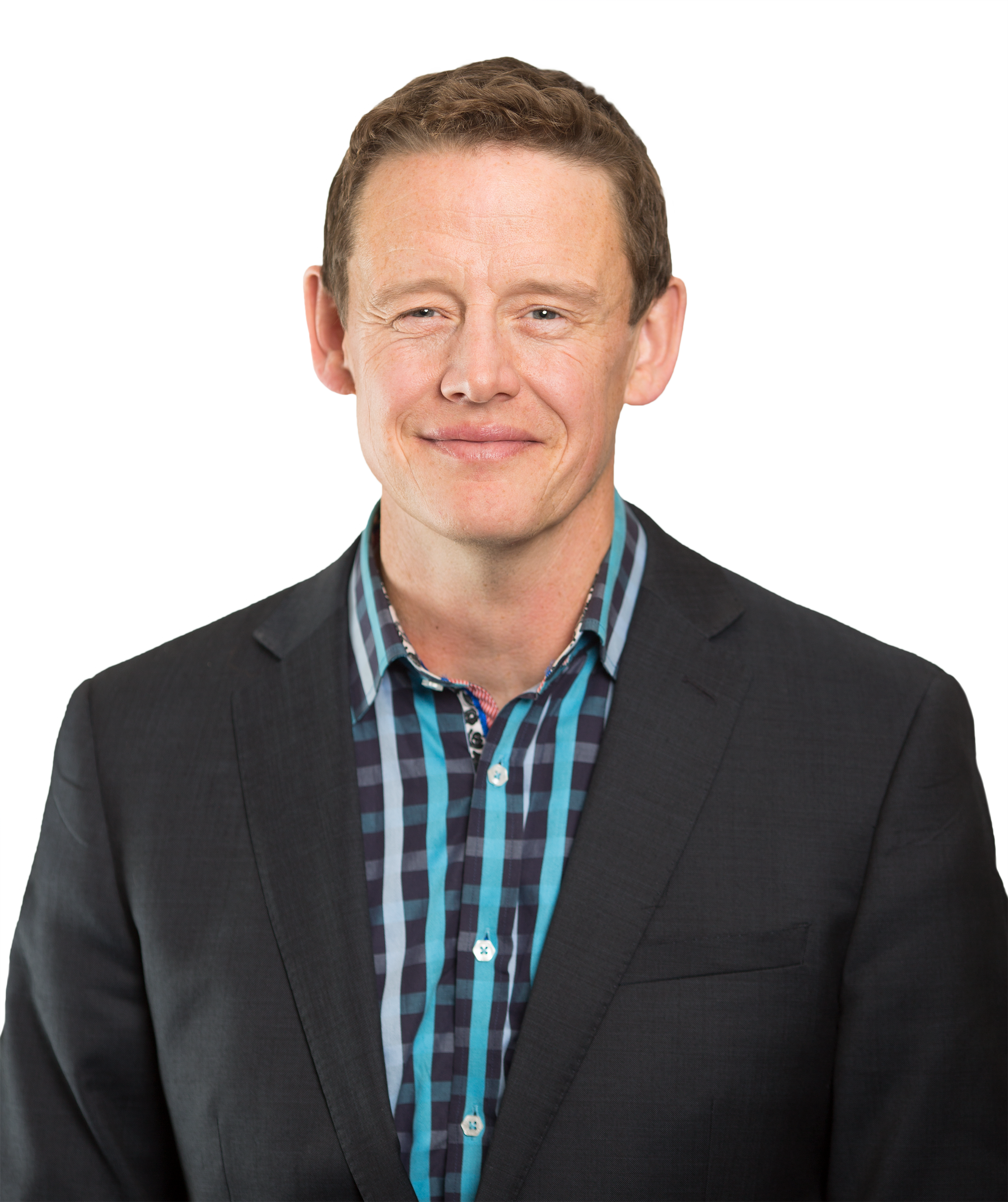
- Harden in 2019

Member of the Ontario Provincial Parliament for Ottawa Centre
- In office June 7, 2018 – January 28, 2025
- Preceded by: Yasir Naqvi
- Succeeded by: Catherine McKenney

Critic roles
- 2022–2025: Opposition Critic for Transit and Active Transportation
- 2018–2022: Opposition Critic for Accessibility and Persons with Disabilities Pensions; Seniors' Affairs

Personal details
- Born: January 14, 1972 (age 54)
- Party: New Democratic; Ontario New Democratic
- Children: 2
- Education: York University; Queen's University
- Occupation: Politician; researcher
- Website: Constituency website Campaign website

Joel Davison Harden (born January 14, 1972) is a former Canadian politician who represented Ottawa Centre in the Legislative Assembly of Ontario from 2018 to 2025. A member of the Ontario New Democratic Party (NDP), Harden served as the party's critic for transit and active transportation. He was the federal NDP candidate in the riding of Ottawa Centre in the 2025 Canadian federal election.

== Background ==
=== Early life and education ===
Harden grew up in Vankleek Hill, Ontario. He holds an undergraduate degree in sociology and political studies from Queen's University. He later attended York University, where he earned a master's degree in 1997 and a doctorate in political science in 2006.

=== Career ===
Harden worked as a researcher at the Canadian Federation of Students (CFS). He was an instructor at the Department of Law and Legal Studies at Carleton University and an adjunct professor at Brock University. He has also taught at Nipissing University, York University, and McMaster University.

From 1998 to 2000, Harden was the chairman of the Ontario section of the CFS. From 2005 to 2010, he was senior researcher at the Canadian Labour Congress (CLC) and was director of the labour education department at the CLC from 2010 to 2012.

In 2013, Formac Lorimer published Joel Harden's book Quiet No More: New Political Activism in Canada and Around the Globe.

== Political career ==
Harden was elected to the Legislative Assembly of Ontario in the 2018 provincial election.

In August 2018, Harden was appointed Official Opposition Critic for Accessibility & Persons with Disabilities; Pensions; Seniors' Affairs. Harden's parliamentary roles included sitting on the Standing Committee on Social Policy.

He is a self-described democratic socialist. Harden supports the BDS movement.

=== Federal politics ===
Harden filed papers in March 2024 to seek the federal NDP's nomination to run as the party's candidate in Ottawa Centre in the 2025 Canadian federal election. He won the contested nomination race on January 11, 2025, against Canadian Labour Congress national director of human rights, Vicky Smallman. He was defeated in the general election, finishing second to Liberal incumbent Yasir Naqvi. Harden endorsed Avi Lewis in the 2026 New Democratic Party leadership election.

=== Controversies ===
==== Support for Khalida Jarrar ====
In 2019, Harden called on Prime Minister Justin Trudeau to demand that Israel immediately release Khalida Jarrar, a member of the Popular Front for the Liberation of Palestine (PFLP), which Canada had designated as a terrorist organization. Jarrar was also a member of the Palestinian Legislative Council, and had been arrested by Israeli security forces and convicted of "promoting terror activities." Harden tweeted that he was "Saddened, sickened and disgusted by the continued abuse of Khalida Jarrar, my parliamentary colleague, by Israeli occupation forces." Michael Mostyn, the CEO of B’nai Brith Canada, released a statement criticizing Harden's support for Jarrar: “It is appalling that an elected official would call for the release of a leader of what Canada rightly acknowledges as an antisemitic terrorist group." The NDP’s provincial secretary, Lucy Watson, clarified that the NDP denounces terrorism in any form and that the NDP supports a "peaceful and sustainable negotiated resolution to the conflict in the region".

==== Comments on Israel and Palestine ====
In November 2022, Harden was criticized for his statements in a video blog interview related to Israel and Palestine. Harden said that the: "single greatest origin of violence in the Middle East is unquestionably the state of Israel." He ultimately issued a written apology for perpetuating an antisemitic stereotype and condemned antisemitism. In the interview, Harden also took a pro-Palestinian position and said: "I think it's important to remain steadfast against all supremacist ideologies, all forms of prejudice and racism. When I'm at Palestinian solidarity demonstrations, if I hear people making antisemitic remarks, I take a point of pulling that person aside and saying "you're not helping." The Centre for Israel and Jewish Affairs posted on social media that Harden's comments in the interview: "can only be called antisemitism and misinformation about Israel." Peter Tabuns, the interim leader of the Ontario New Democratic Party and the leader of the Opposition, said "I welcome his commitment to further education about antisemitism. Antisemitism has no place in our party."

==== Noise law infraction ====
In January 2024, Harden and eight others were fined for Ottawa By-law noise-violations as a result of using a megaphone at a pro-Palestine protest. Ottawa By-Law and Regulatory Services (BLRS) director Roger Chapman said:

It's important to note that enforcement during demonstrations is a result of escalated actions by the participants, which may pose nuisance and public safety issues. As the activities of protesters escalated and became more frequent, including the defacement of property, the use of sound reproduction devices, smoke bombs, fireworks, and threats towards our officers, BLRS took action to address these concerns. Initially, warnings were issued to individuals regarding the operation of these sound production devices ... when the activity persisted, fines of $490 were issued.

== Electoral record ==
=== Federal elections ===
2025 Canadian federal election: Ottawa Centre
Party	Candidate	Votes	%	±%	Expenditures
Liberal	Yasir Naqvi	51,026	62.73	+17.50	$145,082.19
New Democratic	Joel Harden	15,935	19.59	–13.12	$140,977.79
Conservative	Paul D'Orsonnens	12,692	15.60	–0.68	$80,223.66
Green	Amanda Rosenstock	916	1.13	–1.67	$13,758.70
Canadian Future	Andrea Chabot	268	0.33	N/A	$17,715.43
Christian Heritage	Marie-Chantal Leriche	234	0.29	N/A	$0.00
Communist	Cashton Perry	154	0.19	–0.09	$0.00
Independent	Mike Salmon	66	0.08	N/A	$0.00
Independent	Zed Chebib	47	0.06	N/A	none listed
Total valid votes		81,338	99.26	–0.05	$149,828.93
Total rejected ballots		604	0.74	+0.05	
Turnout		81,942	77.43	+2.99	
Eligible voters		105,823			
Liberal notional hold		Swing		+15.31	
Source: Elections Canada

=== Provincial elections ===
2022 Ontario general election: Ottawa Centre
Party	Candidate	Votes	%	±%	Expenditures
New Democratic	Joel Harden	30,311	54.34	+8.26	$134,177
Liberal	Katie Gibbs	12,596	22.58	−10.20	$103,394
Progressive Conservative	Scott Healey	8,773	15.73	−0.31	$45,558
Green	Shelby Bertrand	2,718	4.87	+1.35	$11,136
New Blue	Glen Armstrong	798	1.43		$1,325
None of the Above	Marc Adornato	233	0.42	−0.26	$0
Communist	Stuart Ryan	153	0.27	+0.10	$0
Independent	Thomas Borcsok	82	0.15		$378
People's Front	Raymond Samuels	59	0.11		$285
Independent	Josh Rachlis	58	0.10		$0
Total valid votes/expense limit		55,781	99.52	+0.44	$154,648
Total rejected, unmarked, and declined ballots		266	0.48	-0.44	
Turnout		56,047	50.74	-10.46	
Eligible voters		109,977			
New Democratic hold		Swing		+9.23	
Source(s): "Summary of Valid Votes Cast for Each Candidate" (PDF). Elections Ontario. 2022. Archived from the original on May 18, 2023.; "Statistical Summary by Electoral District" (PDF). Elections Ontario. 2022. Archived from the original on May 21, 2023.

2018 Ontario general election: Ottawa Centre
Party	Candidate	Votes	%	±%
New Democratic	Joel Harden	29,675	46.08	+25.69
Liberal	Yasir Naqvi	21,111	32.78	-18.89
Progressive Conservative	Colleen McCleery	10,327	16.03	-2.08
Green	Cherie Wong	2,266	3.52	-4.22
None of the Above	Marc Adornato	437	0.68	
Libertarian	Bruce A. Faulkner	385	0.60	-0.96
Communist	Stuart Ryan	110	0.17	-0.35
Canadians' Choice	James Sears	92	0.14	
Total valid votes		64,403	100.0	
New Democratic gain from Liberal		Swing		+22.29
Source: Elections Ontario
