= Chris Bradshaw =

Canadian politician (1944–2018)

Interim Leader of the Green Party of Canada
- In office 2001–2003
- Preceded by: Joan Russow
- Succeeded by: Jim Harris

Personal details
- Born: Christopher John Bradshaw; May 20, 1944 Vancouver, British Columbia, Canada
- Died: November 3, 2018 (aged 74) Ottawa, Ontario, Canada
- Party: Green
- Education: Oberlin College

Christopher John Bradshaw (May 20, 1944 – November 3, 2018) was a Canadian politician and businessman. He served as interim leader of the Green Party of Canada from 2001 to 2003, and sought public office as a candidate of the Green Party of Canada and the Green Party of Ontario.

== Business ==
Bradshaw has a Bachelor of Arts degree in political science, and worked for General Motors of Canada following his graduation. He subsequently moved to Ottawa, Ontario, where he worked in a low-income community with the Company of Young Canadians, then as executive director of the CMHC-funded Canadian Organization of Public Housing Tenants, and then for 22 years as community relations specialist for the Planning Department of the Regional Municipality of Ottawa–Carleton, retiring in 1995. He then co-founded Vrtucar, a car-sharing service in Ottawa, in May 2000, but sold his share to his partner in late 2006. The company continues to grow.

== Advocacy ==
In 1988, he started Ottawalk, the first pedestrian advocacy group in the continent. He was recognized by America Walks in 2001 as the "father of pedestrian advocacy in North America."

== Politics ==
In February 2001, Bradshaw was appointed interim leader of the federal Green Party, via election by the board. Bradshaw helped organize the 2003 Green Party Leadership Convention in Ottawa, and was responsible for moving the party's central office to Ottawa from Toronto. In February 2003, he was succeeded as party leader by Jim Harris. At the 2002 national convention in Montreal, he was elected leader, with the understanding that the post would be filled on a more permanent basis in early 2003 via mail-in ballots.

Bradshaw ran for public office in the Ontario provincial election of 1999, receiving 1,231 votes in Ottawa Centre. In the 2003 election, he finished fourth with 3,821 votes (7.75%) in the same riding, the highest vote percentage of any Green Party candidate in the province.

Federally, Bradshaw first ran for office in the general election of 2000. Again campaigning in Ottawa Centre, he received 1529 votes for a fifth-place finish. In 2002, while serving as party leader, he contested a by-election in Bonavista—Trinity—Conception, Newfoundland but received only 139 votes. Bradshaw ran in Newfoundland in an effort to foster a genuinely national party: there has been a history of division between the Terra Nova Green Party, which is the Newfoundland & Labrador Green Party Association, and the federal Green Party.

In the 2004 federal election, Bradshaw campaigned in the rural St. Lawrence Valley riding of Leeds—Grenville, replacing Jerry Heath who unexpectedly declined to run. Despite the last-minute substitution, Bradshaw received 5.5% of the votes cast (2,722), a significant improvement over the Green Party's previous 1.73%.

== Electoral record ==
2004 Canadian federal election: Leeds—Grenville
Party	Candidate	Votes	%	±%	Expenditures
Conservative	Gord Brown	26,002	50.46	-5.80	$69,173
Liberal	Joe Jordan	16,967	32.93	-6.58	$60,373
New Democratic	Steve Armstrong	5,834	11.32	+9.22	$10,009
Green	Chris Bradshaw	2,722	5.28	+3.55	$532
Total valid votes		51,525	100.00		
Conservative notional hold		Swing		+0.39	

2003 Ontario general election: Ottawa Centre
Party	Candidate	Votes	%	±%	Expenditures
Liberal	Richard Patten	22,295	45.10	+6.93	$ 72,458.74
New Democratic	Jeff Atkinson	11,362	22.98	−2.48	49,598.63
Progressive Conservative	Joe Varner	11,217	22.69	−10.05	17,112.70
Green	Chris Bradshaw	3,821	7.73	+5.11	9,283.05
Communist	Stuart Ryan	306	0.62	+0.25	878.30
Freedom	Matt Szymanowicz	218	0.44		0.00
Independent	Fakhry Guirguis	214	0.43		1,094.74
Total valid votes/expense limit		49,433	100.0	+5.08	$ 85,928.64
Total rejected ballots		360	0.72	−0.11	
Turnout		49,793	55.63	+2.67	
Eligible voters		89,509		−0.07	
Source(s) "General Election of October 2, 2003 — Summary of Valid Ballots by Candidate". Elections Ontario. "General Election of October 2, 2003 — Statistical Summary". Elections Ontario. "2003 Candidate and Constituency Association Returns — Candidate Campaign Returns (CR-1)".

Canadian federal by-election, May 13, 2002: Bonavista-Trinity-Conception Resignation of Brian Tobin
Party	Candidate	Votes	%	±%
Liberal	John Efford	18,665	74.82	20.44
Progressive Conservative	Michelle Brazil	5,281	21.17	-5.93
New Democratic	Jim Gill	588	2.36	-13.57
Alliance	David Tulett	166	0.67	-1.92
Green	Chris Bradshaw	139	0.56	–
Independent	Brent Rockwood	106	0.42	–
Total valid votes		24,945	100.0	

2000 Canadian federal election: Ottawa Centre
Party	Candidate	Votes	%	±%
Liberal	Mac Harb	22,710	40.00	-5.19
New Democratic	Heather-Jane Robertson	13,516	23.81	+0.08
Alliance	David Brown	10,167	17.91	+6.34
Progressive Conservative	Beverly Mitchell	7,505	13.22	-3.11
Green	Chris Bradshaw	1,531	2.70	+1.21
Marijuana	Brad Powers	813	1.43	
Canadian Action	Carla Marie Dancey	210	0.37	-0.04
Communist	Marvin Glass	139	0.24	
Natural Law	Neil Paterson	111	0.20	
Marxist–Leninist	Mistahi Corkill	66	0.12	-0.14
Total valid votes		56,768	100.00	

1999 Ontario general election: Ottawa Centre
Party	Candidate	Votes	%	±%	Expenditures
Liberal	Richard Patten	17,956	38.17	−1.09	$ 48,983.01
Progressive Conservative	Ray Kostuch	15,403	32.74	+9.10	54,104.81
New Democratic	Elisabeth Arnold	11,977	25.46	−7.77	58,863.46
Green	Chris Bradshaw	1,231	2.62	+1.39	4,119.65
Communist	Marvin Glass	174	0.37	−0.37	1,384.26
Natural Law	Wayne Foster	170	0.36	−0.93	0.00
Independent	Mistahi Corkill	132	0.28		0.00
Total valid votes/expense limit		47,043	100.0	+65.64	$ 85,987.20
Total rejected ballots		395	0.83	−0.27	
Turnout		47,438	52.96	−10.92	
Eligible voters		89,570		+99.23	
Source(s) "General Election of June 3 1999 — Summary of Valid Ballots by Candidate". Elections Ontario. "General Election of June 3 1999 — Statistical Summary". Elections Ontario. "1999 Summary of Income and Campaign Expenses – Candidate Campaign Returns (CR-1)".
