= Richard Patten =

Canadian politician (1942–2021)

Member of the Ontario Provincial Parliament for Ottawa Centre
- In office 8 June 1995 – 10 October 2007
- Preceded by: Evelyn Gigantes
- Succeeded by: Yasir Naqvi
- In office 10 September 1987 – 6 September 1990
- Preceded by: Evelyn Gigantes
- Succeeded by: Evelyn Gigantes

Personal details
- Born: 13 May 1942 Montreal, Quebec, Canada
- Died: 30 December 2021 (aged 79) Ottawa, Ontario, Canada
- Party: Liberal
- Occupation: YMCA Manager

Richard Andrew Patten (13 May 1942 – 30 December 2021) was a Canadian politician. Patten was a Liberal member of the Legislative Assembly of Ontario from 1987 to 1990 and again from 1995 to 2007. He represented the riding of Ottawa Centre. He served as a cabinet minister in the government of David Peterson.

== Personal life ==
Patten was educated at Sir George Williams University in Montreal. He worked as a manager with the Young Men's Christian Association (YMCA), and served as President of the Canadian Council for International Cooperation. Patten sat on an NGO advisory committee to the World Bank while with the CCIC. He died on 30 December 2021, at the age of 79.

== Politics ==
In the 1987 provincial election, Patten ran as the Liberal candidate in the riding of Ottawa Centre. He defeated incumbent New Democrat Evelyn Gigantes by just over 2,000 votes. The Liberal party won the election and Patten was appointed Minister of Government Services. In August 1989 he was shuffled to Minister of Correctional Services.

In the 1990 provincial election Patten was defeated by his NDP rival Gigantes. For the next five years, Patten served as president and CEO of the Children's Hospital of Eastern Ontario (CHEO) Foundation, doing extensive fund-raising work for the organization.

In 1995 provincial election Patten campaigned against Gigantes once again this time defeating her by 1,700 votes. The Progressive Conservatives won the election, and Patten joined 29 other Liberals in the opposition. He attempted to mobilize a campaign for the party's leadership in 1996, but failed in this effort and subsequently supported Dwight Duncan. When Duncan was eliminated after the third ballot, he endorsed Dalton McGuinty, the eventual winner.

In the 1999 provincial election, Patten was re-elected over Progressive Conservative Ray Kostuch and New Democrat Elisabeth Arnold. The Progressive Conservatives again won the election, and Patten remained in opposition. Patten was treated for non-Hodgkin's lymphoma during this parliament.

The Liberals won the 2003 election and he was re-elected again by over 10,000 votes. During this session he served as parliamentary assistant to the Minister of Education, the Minister of Economic Development and Trade and to Premier Dalton McGuinty. Patten maintained a strong interest in the CHEO and devoted legislative efforts towards the centre's operations.

On 14 March 2007, Patten announced he would not seek re-election in the upcoming election, preferring to focus on work with the CHEO Foundation.

=== Cabinet positions ===
Peterson ministry, Province of Ontario (1985–1990)
Cabinet posts (2)
Predecessor	Office	Successor
David Ramsay	Minister of Correctional Services; 1989–1990	Mike Farnan
Sean Conway	Minister of Government Services; 1987–1989	Chris Ward

== Electoral record ==
2003 Ontario general election: Ottawa Centre
Party	Candidate	Votes	%	±%	Expenditures
Liberal	Richard Patten	22,295	45.10	+6.93	$ 72,458.74
New Democratic	Jeff Atkinson	11,362	22.98	−2.48	49,598.63
Progressive Conservative	Joe Varner	11,217	22.69	−10.05	17,112.70
Green	Chris Bradshaw	3,821	7.73	+5.11	9,283.05
Communist	Stuart Ryan	306	0.62	+0.25	878.30
Freedom	Matt Szymanowicz	218	0.44		0.00
Independent	Fakhry Guirguis	214	0.43		1,094.74
Total valid votes/expense limit		49,433	100.0	+5.08	$ 85,928.64
Total rejected ballots		360	0.72	−0.11	
Turnout		49,793	55.63	+2.67	
Eligible voters		89,509		−0.07	
Source(s) "General Election of October 2, 2003 — Summary of Valid Ballots by Candidate". Elections Ontario. "General Election of October 2, 2003 — Statistical Summary". Elections Ontario. "2003 Candidate and Constituency Association Returns — Candidate Campaign Returns (CR-1)".

1999 Ontario general election: Ottawa Centre
Party	Candidate	Votes	%	±%	Expenditures
Liberal	Richard Patten	17,956	38.17	−1.09	$ 48,983.01
Progressive Conservative	Ray Kostuch	15,403	32.74	+9.10	54,104.81
New Democratic	Elisabeth Arnold	11,977	25.46	−7.77	58,863.46
Green	Chris Bradshaw	1,231	2.62	+1.39	4,119.65
Communist	Marvin Glass	174	0.37	−0.37	1,384.26
Natural Law	Wayne Foster	170	0.36	−0.93	0.00
Independent	Mistahi Corkill	132	0.28		0.00
Total valid votes/expense limit		47,043	100.0	+65.64	$ 85,987.20
Total rejected ballots		395	0.83	−0.27	
Turnout		47,438	52.96	−10.92	
Eligible voters		89,570		+99.23	
Source(s) "General Election of June 3 1999 — Summary of Valid Ballots by Candidate". Elections Ontario. "General Election of June 3 1999 — Statistical Summary". Elections Ontario. "1999 Summary of Income and Campaign Expenses – Candidate Campaign Returns (CR-1)".

1995 Ontario general election: Ottawa Centre
Party	Candidate	Votes	%	±%	Expenditures
Liberal	Richard Patten	11,150	39.26	+0.98	$ 44,245.00
New Democratic	Evelyn Gigantes	9,438	33.23	−14.47	39,455.24
Progressive Conservative	Chris Thompson	6,715	23.64	+14.70	31,048.00
Natural Law	Ron Parker	365	1.29		0.00
Green	Andrew Van Iterson	349	1.23	−0.66	200.00
Communist	Malek Khouri	210	0.74		1,086.25
Independent	John C. Turmel	173	0.61	+0.08	0.00
Total valid votes		28,400	100.0	−6.72	
Total rejected ballots		317	1.10		
Turnout		28,717	63.88		
Eligible voters		44,958			
Source(s) "General Election of June 8 1995 — Summary of Valid Ballots by Candidate". Elections Ontario. "General Election of June 8 1995 — Statistical Summary". Elections Ontario. "1995 Summary of Income and Campaign Expenses" ( Word'95 .doc).

1990 Ontario general election: Ottawa Centre
Party	Candidate	Votes	%	±%
New Democratic	Evelyn Gigantes	14,522	47.70	+7.64
Liberal	Richard Patten	11,656	38.28	−8.88
Progressive Conservative	Alex Burney	2,723	8.94	−1.8
Family Coalition	John Gray	809	2.66	
Green	Bill Hipwell	576	1.89	
Independent	John Turmel	160	0.53	−1.50
Total valid votes		30,446	100.0	+3.54

1987 Ontario general election: Ottawa Centre
Party	Candidate	Votes	%	±%
Liberal	Richard Patten	13,867	47.16	+21.20
New Democratic	Evelyn Gigantes	11,780	40.06	−3.39
Progressive Conservative	Greg Vezina	3,159	10.74	−18.51
Independent	John Turmel	598	2.03	+0.70
Total valid votes		29,404	100.0	+7.46
