= Harold MacKenzie =

Canadian politician

Harold Arthur MacKenzie

MPP for Ottawa Centre
- In office October 17, 1967 – October 20, 1971
- Preceded by: New Riding
- Succeeded by: Michael Morris Cassidy

Personal details
- Born: January 21, 1921 Truro, Nova Scotia
- Died: August 12, 2012 (aged 91) Ottawa, Ontario
- Party: Liberal

Harold Arthur MacKenzie (1922 – August 15, 2012) was a Canadian politician, who represented Ottawa Centre in the Legislative Assembly of Ontario from 1967 to 1971 as a Liberal member.

MacKenzie was elected in the general election in 1967. During the 28th Legislative Assembly of Ontario he served on six Standing Committees of the Legislative Assembly.

Born in Truro, Nova Scotia, MacKenzie served as an officer on HMCS Uganda during the Second World War, then returned to Canada and became a professional engineer, working first in private practice and later with the Department of Defense, in Ottawa.

MacKenzie was divorced and had three daughters, Jocelyn, Alison and Susanne.
