= Michael Cassidy (Canadian politician) =

Canadian politician (1937–2025)

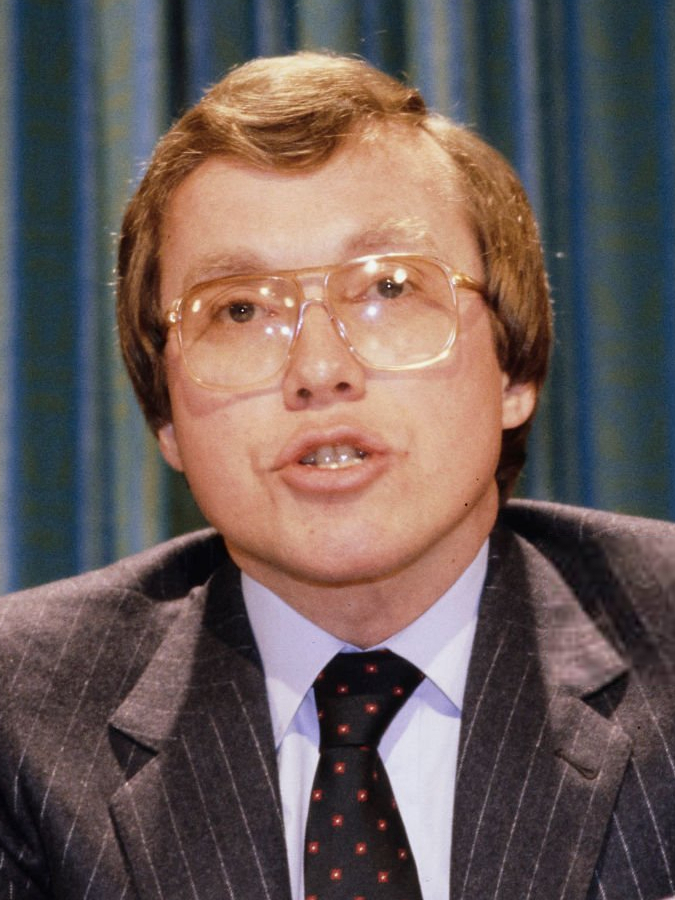
- Cassidy in 1981

Leader of the Ontario New Democratic Party
- In office 1978–1982
- Preceded by: Stephen Lewis
- Succeeded by: Bob Rae

Member of Parliament
- In office 1984–1988
- Preceded by: John Leslie Evans
- Succeeded by: Mac Harb
- Constituency: Ottawa Centre, Ontario

Member of Provincial Parliament
- In office 1971–1984
- Preceded by: Harold MacKenzie
- Succeeded by: Evelyn Gigantes
- Constituency: Ottawa Centre, Ontario

Alderman on Ottawa City Council
- In office January 1, 1970 – September 1, 1972
- Preceded by: Mary Harrison and Lionel O'Connor
- Succeeded by: Joe Cassey
- Constituency: Wellington Ward

Lanark Highlands Township Councillor
- In office 2003–2006

Personal details
- Born: Michael Morris Cassidy; May 10, 1937 Victoria, British Columbia, Canada
- Died: November 9, 2025 (aged 88)
- Party: Ontario New Democratic Party (provincial); New Democratic Party (federal)
- Spouse: Maureen Waddington (died 2015)
- Children: 3
- Education: Trinity College, Toronto; London School of Economics
- Occupation: Radio and television broadcaster

Michael Morris Cassidy (May 10, 1937 – November 9, 2025) was a Canadian politician. He served in the Legislative Assembly of Ontario from 1971 to 1984, and in the House of Commons of Canada from 1984 to 1988. Cassidy was the leader of the New Democratic Party of Ontario from 1978 to 1982.

== Early life and career ==
Cassidy was born on May 10, 1937, in Victoria, British Columbia, the son of Beatrice Pearce and Harry Cassidy. Henry who was a founding member of the Co-operative Commonwealth Federation, a one-time candidate for the leadership of the Ontario Liberal Party, and dean of the School of Social Work at the University of Toronto. After graduating from the University of Toronto Schools, Cassidy attended the University of Trinity College in the University of Toronto, and the London School of Economics. Before politics, Cassidy worked as a journalist, and was bureau chief of the Financial Times of Canada in Ottawa for a period.

== Political career ==
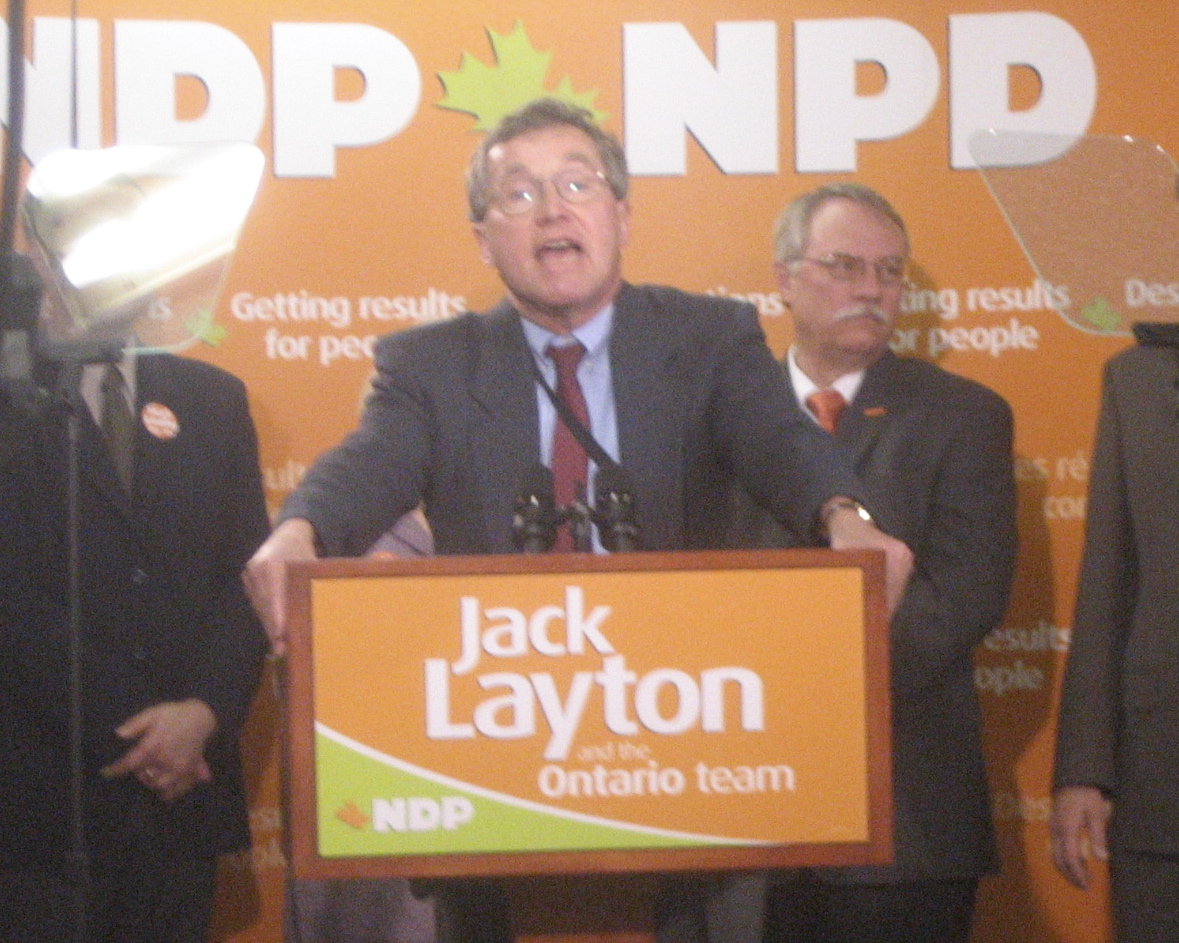
Cassidy speaking at a federal NDP rally in 2006

Cassidy was elected as an Ottawa alderman in the December 1969 municipal election, topping the poll in Wellington Ward, electing himself to Ottawa-Carleton Regional Council too, as a result. While serving on council, he also became a journalism lecturer at Carleton University.

Two years later, he was elected to the Ontario legislature for Ottawa Centre in the 1971 provincial election. Cassidy defeated Progressive Conservative candidate Garry Guzzo, who later served in the legislature from 1995 to 2003, by 182 votes. He did not immediately resign from his council seat and held both positions until the provincial government banned concurrent tenure in 1972. Focusing on provincial politics, Cassidy was re-elected with an increased majority in the 1975 election, in which the NDP under Stephen Lewis reduced the Conservatives to a minority government and became the official opposition in the legislature.

The NDP fell back to third place, behind the Liberal Party, in the 1977 provincial election, and Lewis resigned as leader the following year. Cassidy entered the contest to succeed him and defeated Ian Deans and Michael Breaugh in February 1978. He had a difficult job following Lewis, who was a charismatic and dynamic figure. Cassidy, by comparison, had a rather dry personality. He was also the most left-wing of the three leadership candidates, and was not fully trusted by the party establishment. Cassidy's policy advisor in the leadership campaign was James Laxer, a former leader of The Waffle NDP faction, which had separated from the party in 1974. Some members of the NDP caucus considered his election as a serious mistake and encouraged him to resign before contesting an election. Cassidy ignored this advice and remained as leader.

The NDP fared poorly in the 1981 election, falling from 33 seats to 21. Their decline allowed the Progressive Conservatives to regain a majority government, while the Liberals neither gained nor lost seats. Cassidy faced a difficult re-election in Ottawa Centre, defeating PC candidate David Small by only 599 votes. He stepped down as leader after the campaign and was replaced in 1982 by Bob Rae. Donald C. MacDonald, another former NDP leader, would later describe Cassidy's leadership as "an unhappy interlude for both him and the party".

Cassidy then resigned as Member of Provincial Parliament (MPP) in 1984 to enter national politics. He campaigned for the federal New Democratic Party in the 1984 election, defeating Progressive Conservative candidate Dan Chilcott by 54 votes to win the Ottawa Centre riding; two-term Liberal MP John Leslie Evans fell to third place. He served in the 33rd Canadian Parliament. He lost his seat in the 1988 election, coming 762 votes behind Liberal challenger Mac Harb.

Cassidy was appointed to the board of directors of Ontario Hydro in the early 1990s, during Bob Rae's tenure as premier. He was fired without notice on January 10, 1996, by the Progressive Conservative government of Mike Harris, but was reinstated by a court order on January 19. Cassidy opposed the Harris government's plan to restructure and partially privatize the Crown corporation and remained a director until 1997.

In 2005, Cassidy became involved in a battle to protect Tay River and the surrounding area from exploitation by multinational developers. He published an essay on the controversy in October 2005. Cassidy has also operated the Ottawa-based Ginger Group Consultants firm, providing lobbying, strategic planning and public relations work for labour organizations and related groups.

He was elected to Council in the Township of Lanark Highlands in 2003 but was defeated in 2006.

== Personal life and death ==
His wife, Maureen Cassidy (née Waddington), died on October 21, 2015. The couple had three children.

Cassidy considered himself an agnostic, and a humanist. He was a Unitarian lay preacher while in England.

While sitting at Queen's Park, Cassidy earned a Master's of Business Administration from York University in 1984.

Cassidy died on November 9, 2025, at the age of 88. He was paid tribute by now-Ontario NDP leader Marit Stiles.

== Electoral record ==
1988 Canadian federal election: Ottawa Centre
Party	Candidate	Votes	%	±%
Liberal	Mac Harb	18,096	36.46	+6.84
New Democratic	Mike Cassidy	17,334	34.92	+0.55
Progressive Conservative	Bob Plamondon	13,142	26.48	−7.78
Green	John W. Dodson	300	0.60	+0.05
Rhinoceros	Leapin Liz Johnson	292	0.59	−0.15
Independent	John Turmel	152	0.31	
Independent	Michael K.B. Hahn	115	0.23	
Libertarian	Rudolph Shally	111	0.22	
Independent	Hardial Bains	66	0.13	
Commonwealth of Canada	Istvan Kovach	30	0.06	
Total valid votes		49,638	100.00	
Source(s) "History of Federal Ridings — General Elections — OTTAWA CENTRE, Ontario (1966- )". Parliament of Canada.

1984 Canadian federal election: Ottawa Centre
Party	Candidate	Votes	%	±%
New Democratic	Mike Cassidy	17,844	34.37	+18.41
Progressive Conservative	Dan Chilcott	17,790	34.26	−2.15
Liberal	John Evans	15,380	29.62	−16.28
Rhinoceros	Barry J. Heidt	382	0.74	−0.02
Green	Gordon Scott McLeod	285	0.55	
Communist	Marvin Glass	93	0.18	−0.07
Independent	Ray Joseph Cormier	71	0.14	
Independent	Rodger L. James	45	0.09	
Independent	Marc Gauvin	29	0.06	
Total valid votes		51,919	100.00	
Source(s) "History of Federal Ridings — General Elections — OTTAWA CENTRE, Ontario (1966- )". Parliament of Canada.

1981 Ontario general election: Ottawa Centre
Party	Candidate	Votes	%	±%
New Democratic	Michael Cassidy	9,316	36.77	−4.79
Progressive Conservative	David Small	8,717	34.41	+2.25
Liberal	Karl Feige	6,926	27.34	+2.47
Independent	John Turmel	376	1.48	
Total valid votes		25,335	100.0	−0.91

1977 Ontario general election: Ottawa Centre
Party	Candidate	Votes	%	±%
New Democratic	Michael Cassidy	10,626	41.56	+2.64
Progressive Conservative	Brian Cameron	8,223	32.16	−0.62
Liberal	Ian Kimmerly	6,358	24.87	−2.52
Communist	Marvin Glass	360	1.41	+0.5
Total valid votes		25,567	100.0	−6.64

1975 Ontario general election: Ottawa Centre
Party	Candidate	Votes	%	±%
New Democratic	Michael Cassidy	11,658	38.92	+3.46
Progressive Conservative	Gale Kerwin	8,978	32.78	−1.88
Liberal	Gerald Kirby	7,500	27.39	−2.49
Communist	Marvin Glass	250	0.91	
Total valid votes		27,386	100.0	+20.26

1971 Ontario general election: Ottawa Centre
Party	Candidate	Votes	%	±%
New Democratic	Michael Cassidy	8,075	35.46	+17.59
Progressive Conservative	Garry Guzzo	7,893	34.66	−4.4
Liberal	Rudy Capogreco	6,804	29.88	−13.19
Total valid votes		22,772	100.0	+27.57
