= Katie Gibbs =

Canadian science advocate

- Education: University of Guelph University of Ottawa
- Known for: Science advocacy
- Scientific career
- Thesis: Species Declines: Examining patterns of species distribution, abundance, variability and conservation status in relation to anthropogenic activities. (2012)
- Doctoral advisor: David J. Currie

Katherine E. Gibbs, better known as Katie Gibbs, is the co-founder and executive director of the Canadian advocacy group Evidence for Democracy (E4D).

== Education ==
In 2006, Gibbs completed a Bachelor of Science degree in zoology at the University of Guelph. In 2012, Gibbs completed a PhD in conservation biology at the University of Ottawa, where she researched threats to endangered species across Canada. She studied the habitats of 62 imperiled species of birds, reptiles, mammals and amphibians in Canada. The study concluded that use of pesticides in agricultural land had a correlation to the loss of species.

== Career ==
=== Advocacy ===
Prior to forming E4D, Gibbs was involved in social and political campaigning for the Green Party of Canada, where she was the co-chair of the first youth wing of the Green Party, the President of her local riding Green Party association, and worked at the central Green Party office in Ottawa during the 2011 elections. During her PhD, Gibbs was one of the organizers for a Death of Evidence protest in Ottawa, in July 2012. Over 2,000 scientists and supporters attended the protest, which was in the form of a mock funeral, to protest then Prime Minister Stephen Harper's government funding cuts to basic science research. The protest's success prompted Gibbs to co-found E4D: a non-partisan Canadian non-profit organization which advocates for evidence-based policy-making in the government.

Gibbs is E4D's Executive Director. On behalf of the organization, Gibbs has commented on various science policy issues in the media, including the hiring of Mona Nemer (Canada's Chief Science Advisor), the firing of Molly Shoichet (Ontario's first Chief Scientist) and the introduction of scientific integrity guidelines in the Canadian government.

She was a panellist at the Canadian Science Policy Conference for a panel titled 'Science Integrity: Jump-starting Public Science' and is also the co-author of several articles in the Ottawa Citizen.

=== Awards ===
In 2015, Gibbs was shortlisted for the Everyday Political Citizen of the Year award. Gibbs received a 2016 Young Alumni Awards of Excellence from her alma mater, the University of Ottawa.

=== Politics ===
On September 28, 2021, Gibbs was nominated to run for the Ontario Liberal Party in the 2022 election. Running in Ottawa Centre, she came in second behind incumbent Ontario New Democratic Party Member of Provincial Parliament Joel Harden.

2022 Ontario general election: Ottawa Centre
Party	Candidate	Votes	%	±%	Expenditures
New Democratic	Joel Harden	30,311	54.34	+8.26	$134,177
Liberal	Katie Gibbs	12,596	22.58	−10.20	$103,394
Progressive Conservative	Scott Healey	8,773	15.73	−0.31	$45,558
Green	Shelby Bertrand	2,718	4.87	+1.35	$11,136
New Blue	Glen Armstrong	798	1.43		$1,325
None of the Above	Marc Adornato	233	0.42	−0.26	$0
Communist	Stuart Ryan	153	0.27	+0.10	$0
Independent	Thomas Borcsok	82	0.15		$378
People's Front	Raymond Samuels	59	0.11		$285
Independent	Josh Rachlis	58	0.10		$0
Total valid votes/expense limit		55,781	99.52	+0.44	$154,648
Total rejected, unmarked, and declined ballots		266	0.48	-0.44	
Turnout		56,047	50.74	-10.46	
Eligible voters		109,977			
New Democratic hold		Swing		+9.23	
Source(s): "Summary of Valid Votes Cast for Each Candidate" (PDF). Elections Ontario. 2022. Archived from the original on 2023-05-18.; "Statistical Summary by Electoral District" (PDF). Elections Ontario. 2022. Archived from the original on 2023-05-21.

== Bibliography ==
=== Selected Academic Publications ===
- Gibbs, K.E. and Currie, D.J. "Protecting Endangered Species: Do the Main Legislative Tools Work?" PLoS ONE. 7(5): e35730.
- Gibbs, K.E., Mackey, R.L. and Currie, D.J. "Human land use, agriculture, pesticides and losses of imperiled species." Diversity and Distributions. 15, 242–253.
- Gibbs, K.E. and Magnuson-Ford, K. "Can scientists speak?"

=== Selected Editorials ===
- Gibbs, K.E. and Westwood, A. "We need a national debate on science." Toronto Star.
- Gibbs, K.E. "Canada’s future depends on a national science strategy that offers bold vision." Power and Influence magazine.
