= Evidence For Democracy =

Non-partisan Canadian non-profit organization

Evidence for Democracy (E4D) is a non-partisan Canadian non-profit organization which advocates for evidence-based policy-making in the government. It was co-founded by Katie Gibbs (executive director) and Scott Findlay in 2012.

== History ==
In July 2012, prior to forming E4D, Katie Gibbs was one of the organizers for the Death of Evidence protest in Ottawa. Over 2,000 scientists and supporters attended the protest, which was in the form of a mock funeral, to protest then Prime Minister Stephen Harper's government funding cuts to basic science research and in response to Bill C-38. The protest's success prompted Gibbs to co-found E4D.

== Organization ==
E4D advocates for evidence-based policy-making and to build a national culture where science and evidence are valued. E4D primarily launches issue-based campaigns to address current issues which affect science, alongside panels, lectures, workshops and documentary screenings, to provide knowledge and skill-based training to the scientific community, as well as the broader public.

== Notable campaigns ==
On 16 September 2013, E4D collaborated with local organizers to hold Stand Up for Science protests in 17 cities (including Toronto and Vancouver), to voice concerns for the state of science in Canada. Previous science advocacy, coupled with the Stand Up for Science protests across Canada, helped place science as a key campaign issue in the 2015 Canadian federal elections.

In March 2016, the Professional Institute of the Public Service of Canada and E4D submitted an open letter with over 5,000 Canadians signatures, to the Canadian Prime Minister Justin Trudeau, Minister Navdeep Bains, and Minister Kirsty Duncan, to safeguard government scientists' right to speak through collective agreements. In July 2018, following lobbying, the Canadian federal government introduced guidelines for scientific integrity.

In September 2017, E4D launched a petition, on behalf of the Polar Environment Atmospheric Research Laboratory (PEARL), to advocate for funding for PEARL's research into Canadian atmospheric climate science. As a result of this petition and lobbying from others, the Canadian government allocated $1.6 million to allow PEARL's continued operation until fall of 2019. E4D is currently campaigning for long-term PEARL funding, and to re-introduce funding for the six Canadian climate science projects (members of the Climate Change and Atmospheric Research program) which lost their funding.

Throughout 2018, E4D collaborated with local organizers to host the March for Science in 10 Canadian cities (St. John's, Halifax, Montreal, Ottawa, Toronto, Windsor, Winnipeg, Regina, Vancouver and Victoria) on Saturday 14 April 2018. In mid-2018, E4D partnered with others to launch a campaign to return environmental and natural resource decision-making to public interest, advocating for the public to contact their representative and the Minister of the Environment and Climate Change Strategy. This campaign aims to address the British Columbia government's professional reliance system.

On 8 August 2019, a call to vote for science was published by The Narwhal. This campaign was also promoted by the E4D just because they stand for funding structures, integration of science into policy and transparency and openness.

During March 2023, virtual weekly video sessions were presented as part of the organization's Evidence Matters campaign. Recordings are available on YouTube.
