= Ottawa Centre (provincial electoral district) =

Provincial electoral district in Ontario, Canada

Coordinates: 45°25′N 75°42′W

Ontario electoral district
- Ottawa Centre in relation to other Ottawa electoral districts

Provincial electoral district
- Legislature: Legislative Assembly of Ontario
MPP
Catherine McKenney
New Democratic
- District created: 1966
- First contested: 1968
- Last contested: 2025

Demographics
- Population (2016): 118,040
- Electors (2018): 106,208
- Area (km²): 37
- Pop. density (per km²): 3,190.3
- Census division: Ottawa
- Census subdivision: Ottawa

Ottawa Centre is an urban provincial electoral district in Ontario, Canada that has been represented in the Legislative Assembly of Ontario since 1968. While the riding's boundaries (mainly to the south and west as the north and east borders have remained the Ottawa River and Rideau Canal, respectively) have changed over the years to account for population changes, the riding has always comprised the central areas of Ottawa, the nation's capital.

== History ==
The district was created before the 1967 election. Since the 1999 election, the provincial district has had the same borders as the federal riding of Ottawa Centre.

It is represented in the Legislative Assembly of Ontario by Catherine McKenney of the Ontario NDP. The provincial riding has been won by the NDP ten times (1971, 1975, 1977, 1981, 1984 by-election, 1985, 1990, 2018, 2022, and 2025) and by the Liberals eight times (1967, 1987, 1995, 1999, 2003, 2007, 2011, and 2014) and never by the Conservatives or any other party.

== Geography ==
The riding covers most of downtown Ottawa, including the Parliament Buildings. From the historic Rideau Canal, the riding stretches west encompassing the neighbourhoods of Downtown, Centretown (Centretown West which includes Little Italy is usually considered a distinct neighbourhood), Lebreton Flats, Mechanicsville, Hintonburg, and Westboro. The riding encompasses additional neighbourhoods south of downtown, including The Glebe, Old Ottawa South, Lees Avenue, Old Ottawa East and others.

Party support varies between different parts of the riding. The consistently best areas for the Ontario New Democratic Party (NDP) are Old Ottawa South, the Glebe, and Centretown. Old Ottawa South and the Glebe are also the main Green party areas. The suburban far south and west of the riding around Hog's Back and Carlingwood Park, the large homes near the Civic Hospital, the expensive homes and apartments by the Rideau Canal, and the more expensive downtown condos are the most strongly Liberal and Conservative areas. The major swing areas are the western portions of the riding such as Hintonburg and Westboro: while traditionally Liberal, these neighbourhoods have recently become stronger for the NDP.

Many public sector workers live in the riding. The northern part of the riding contains many government office buildings, including Parliament Hill. The riding also includes Carleton University and Saint Paul University's campuses and residences.

== Members of Provincial Parliament ==
Ottawa Centre
Assembly	Years	Member	Party
Riding created
28th	1967–1971	Harold MacKenzie	Liberal
29th	1971–1975	Michael Cassidy	New Democratic
30th	1975–1977	Michael Cassidy	New Democratic
31st	1977–1981	Michael Cassidy	New Democratic
32nd	1981–1984	Michael Cassidy	New Democratic
32nd	1984–1985	Evelyn Gigantes	New Democratic
33rd	1985–1987	Evelyn Gigantes	New Democratic
34th	1987–1990	Richard Patten	Liberal
35th	1990–1995	Evelyn Gigantes	New Democratic
36th	1995–1999	Richard Patten	Liberal
37th	1999–2003	Richard Patten	Liberal
38th	2003–2007	Richard Patten	Liberal
39th	2007–2011	Yasir Naqvi	Liberal
40th	2011–2014	Yasir Naqvi	Liberal
41st	2014–2018	Yasir Naqvi	Liberal
42nd	2018–2022	Joel Harden	New Democratic
43rd	2022–2025	Joel Harden	New Democratic
44th	2025–present	Catherine McKenney	New Democratic

== Election results ==
Winning party in each polling division of Ottawa Centre at the 2025 Ontario general election

2025 Ontario general election
Party	Candidate	Votes	%	±%	Expenditures
New Democratic	Catherine McKenney	32,483	55.70	+1.36	$130,575
Liberal	Thomas Simpson	13,591	23.30	+0.72	$84,596
Progressive Conservative	Scott Healey	9,573	16.41	+0.68	$13,986
Green	Simon Beckett	1,550	2.66	–2.21	$13,220
New Blue	Maria Desouza	468	0.80	–0.63	$7,244
Ontario Party	Shannon Boschy	321	0.55	N/A	$3,402
Communist	Cashton Perry	232	0.40	+0.13	$0
Independent	Josh Rachlis	102	0.17	N/A	$0
Total valid votes/expense limit		58,320	99.53	+0.01	$192,174
Total rejected, unmarked, and declined ballots		277	0.47	–0.01	
Turnout		58,597	49.09	-1.65	
Eligible voters		119,363			
New Democratic hold		Swing		+0.32	
Source(s): "VOTE TOTALS FROM OFFICIAL TABULATION" (PDF). Elections Ontario. March 2, 2025.

Winning party in each polling division of Ottawa Centre at the 2022 Ontario general election

2022 Ontario general election
Party	Candidate	Votes	%	±%	Expenditures
New Democratic	Joel Harden	30,311	54.34	+8.26	$134,177
Liberal	Katie Gibbs	12,596	22.58	−10.20	$103,394
Progressive Conservative	Scott Healey	8,773	15.73	−0.31	$45,558
Green	Shelby Bertrand	2,718	4.87	+1.35	$11,136
New Blue	Glen Armstrong	798	1.43		$1,325
None of the Above	Marc Adornato	233	0.42	−0.26	$0
Communist	Stuart Ryan	153	0.27	+0.10	$0
Independent	Thomas Borcsok	82	0.15		$378
People's Front	Raymond Samuels	59	0.11		$285
Independent	Josh Rachlis	58	0.10		$0
Total valid votes/expense limit		55,781	99.52	+0.44	$154,648
Total rejected, unmarked, and declined ballots		266	0.48	-0.44	
Turnout		56,047	50.74	-10.46	
Eligible voters		109,977			
New Democratic hold		Swing		+9.23	
Source(s): "Summary of Valid Votes Cast for Each Candidate" (PDF). Elections Ontario. 2022. Archived from the original on May 18, 2023.; "Statistical Summary by Electoral District" (PDF). Elections Ontario. 2022. Archived from the original on May 21, 2023.

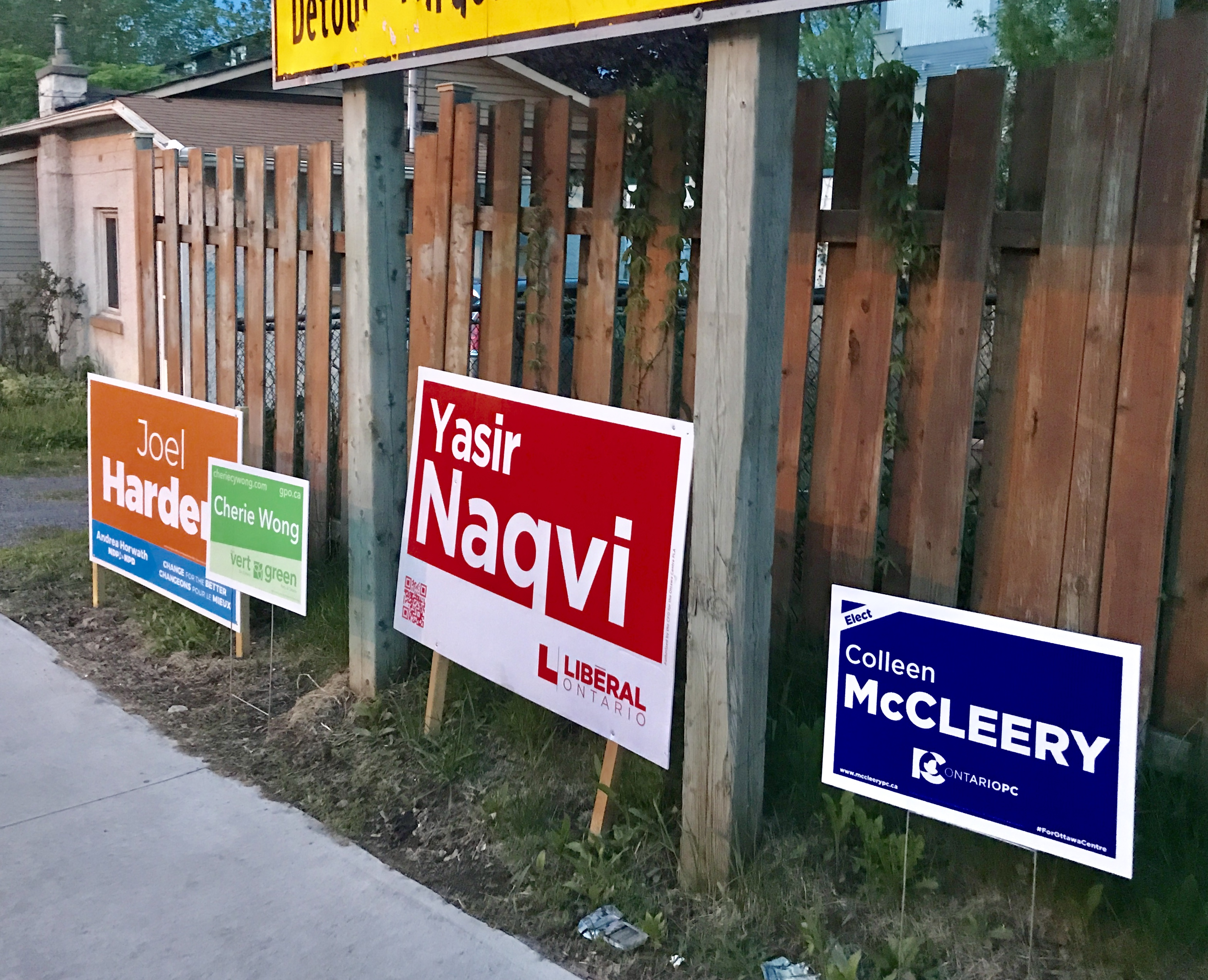
Election signs on Lees Avenue during the 2018 election campaign

2018 Ontario general election
Party	Candidate	Votes	%	±%
New Democratic	Joel Harden	29,675	46.08	+25.69
Liberal	Yasir Naqvi	21,111	32.78	-18.89
Progressive Conservative	Colleen McCleery	10,327	16.03	-2.08
Green	Cherie Wong	2,266	3.52	-4.22
None of the Above	Marc Adornato	437	0.68	
Libertarian	Bruce A. Faulkner	385	0.60	-0.96
Communist	Stuart Ryan	110	0.17	-0.35
Canadians' Choice	James Sears	92	0.14	
Total valid votes		64,403	100.0	
New Democratic gain from Liberal		Swing		+22.29
Source: Elections Ontario

2014 Ontario general election
Party	Candidate	Votes	%	±%
Liberal	Yasir Naqvi	27,689	52.02	+4.86
New Democratic	Jennifer McKenzie	10,894	20.47	−8.74
Progressive Conservative	Rob Dekker	9,678	18.18	−0.21
Green	Kevin O'Donnell	4,163	7.82	+3.42
Libertarian	Bruce A. Faulkner	525	0.99	+1.08
Communist	Larry L. Wasslen	283	0.53	+0.21
Total valid votes		53,232	100.0	+5.74
Liberal hold		Swing		+6.80
Source(s) "Election Night Results – General Election Results by District – 062, Ottawa Centre – Unofficial". Elections Ontario.

2011 Ontario general election
Party	Candidate	Votes	%	±%	Expenditures
Liberal	Yasir Naqvi	23,646	46.81	+11.90	$ 102,168.00
New Democratic	Anil Naidoo	14,715	29.13	−1.77	83,779.02
Progressive Conservative	Rob Dekker	9,257	18.33	−1.59	27,933.58
Green	Kevin O'Donnell	2,184	4.32	−8.03	5,902.64
Independent	Kristina Chapman	309	0.61		3,418.00
Libertarian	Michal Zeithammel	240	0.48		0.00
Communist	Stuart Ryan	160	0.32	−0.07	394.11
Total valid votes / expense limit		50,511	100.00	−3.41	$ 112,575.19
Total rejected, unmarked and declined ballots		290	0.57	−0.13	
Turnout		50,801	53.74	−4.51	
Eligible voters		94,533		+4.57	
Liberal hold		Swing		+6.34	
Source(s) "Summary of Valid Votes Cast for Each Candidate – October 6, 2011 General Election" (PDF). Elections Ontario. "Statistical Summary – General Elections 2011" ( XLS Spreadsheet). Elections Ontario. "2011 Candidate Campaign Returns (CR-1)".

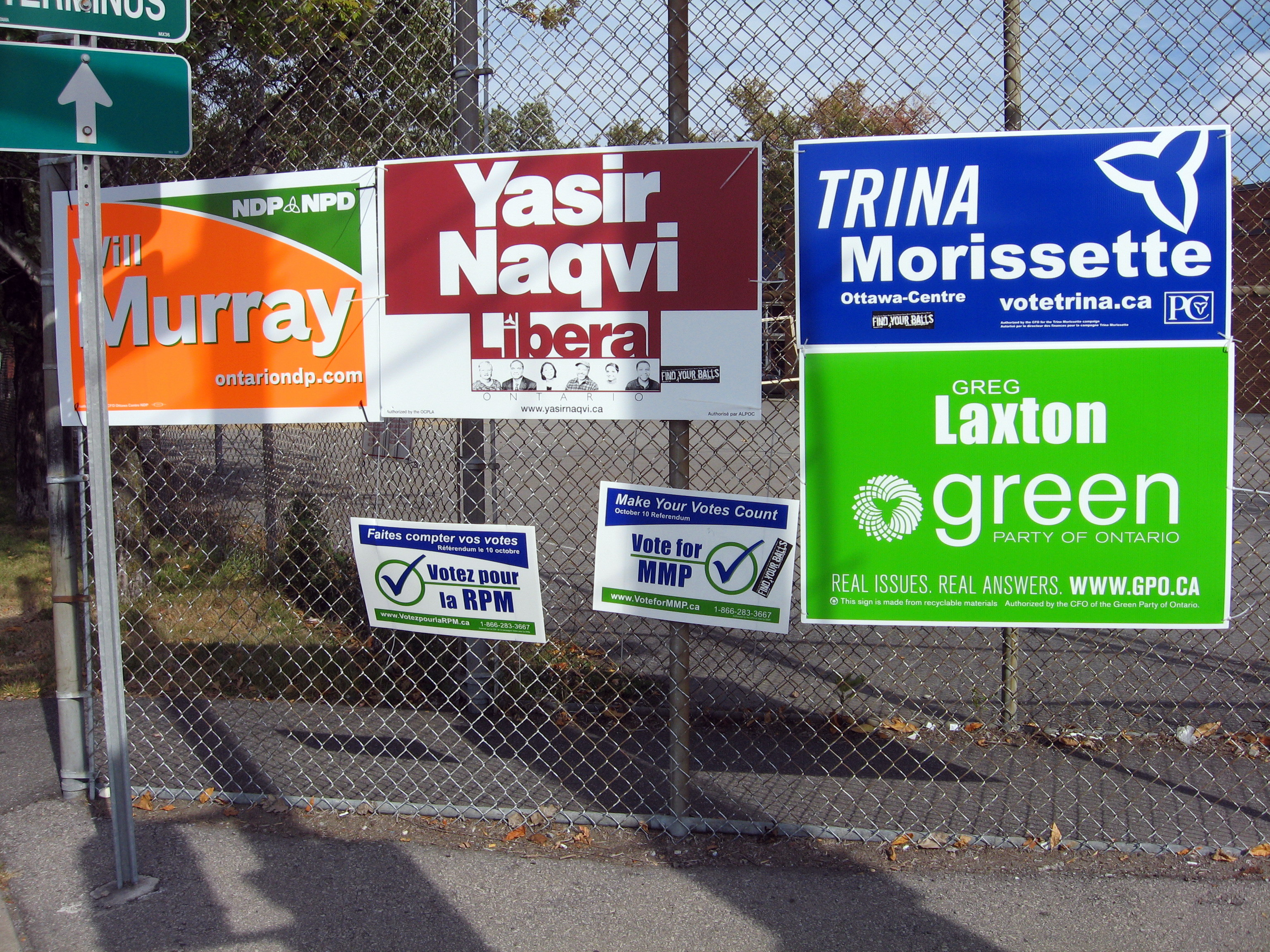
Election signs for the major party Ottawa Centre candidates during the 2007 election

2007 Ontario general election
Party	Candidate	Votes	%	±%	Expenditures
Liberal	Yasir Naqvi	18,255	34.91	−10.19	$ 74,103.43
New Democratic	Will Murray	16,161	30.90	+7.92	76,746.81
Progressive Conservative	Trina Morissette	10,416	19.92	−2.77	41,039.06
Green	Greg Laxton	6,458	12.35	+4.62	9,967.33
Family Coalition	Danny Moran	516	0.99		627.00
Independent	Richard Eveleigh	283	0.54		70.00
Communist	Stuart Ryan	204	0.39	−0.23	928.61
Total valid votes/expense limit		52,293	100.0	+5.79	$ 97,635.24
Total rejected ballots		366	0.70	−0.02	
Turnout		52,659	58.25	+2.62	
Eligible voters		90,403		+1.00	
Source(s) "Summary of Valid Votes Cast for Each Candidate – October 10, 2007 General Election" (PDF). Elections Ontario. "Statistical Summary – General Elections 2007" (PDF). Elections Ontario. "2007 Candidate Campaign Returns (CR-1)".

2003 Ontario general election
Party	Candidate	Votes	%	±%	Expenditures
Liberal	Richard Patten	22,295	45.10	+6.93	$ 72,458.74
New Democratic	Jeff Atkinson	11,362	22.98	−2.48	49,598.63
Progressive Conservative	Joe Varner	11,217	22.69	−10.05	17,112.70
Green	Chris Bradshaw	3,821	7.73	+5.11	9,283.05
Communist	Stuart Ryan	306	0.62	+0.25	878.30
Freedom	Matt Szymanowicz	218	0.44		0.00
Independent	Fakhry Guirguis	214	0.43		1,094.74
Total valid votes/expense limit		49,433	100.0	+5.08	$ 85,928.64
Total rejected ballots		360	0.72	−0.11	
Turnout		49,793	55.63	+2.67	
Eligible voters		89,509		−0.07	
Source(s) "General Election of October 2, 2003 — Summary of Valid Ballots by Candidate". Elections Ontario. "General Election of October 2, 2003 — Statistical Summary". Elections Ontario. "2003 Candidate and Constituency Association Returns — Candidate Campaign Returns (CR-1)".

1999 Ontario general election
Party	Candidate	Votes	%	±%	Expenditures
Liberal	Richard Patten	17,956	38.17	−1.09	$ 48,983.01
Progressive Conservative	Ray Kostuch	15,403	32.74	+9.10	54,104.81
New Democratic	Elisabeth Arnold	11,977	25.46	−7.77	58,863.46
Green	Chris Bradshaw	1,231	2.62	+1.39	4,119.65
Communist	Marvin Glass	174	0.37	−0.37	1,384.26
Natural Law	Wayne Foster	170	0.36	−0.93	0.00
Independent	Mistahi Corkill	132	0.28		0.00
Total valid votes/expense limit		47,043	100.0	+65.64	$ 85,987.20
Total rejected ballots		395	0.83	−0.27	
Turnout		47,438	52.96	−10.92	
Eligible voters		89,570		+99.23	
Source(s) "General Election of June 3 1999 — Summary of Valid Ballots by Candidate". Elections Ontario. "General Election of June 3 1999 — Statistical Summary". Elections Ontario. "1999 Summary of Income and Campaign Expenses – Candidate Campaign Returns (CR-1)".

1995 Ontario general election
Party	Candidate	Votes	%	±%	Expenditures
Liberal	Richard Patten	11,150	39.26	+0.98	$ 44,245.00
New Democratic	Evelyn Gigantes	9,438	33.23	−14.47	39,455.24
Progressive Conservative	Chris Thompson	6,715	23.64	+14.70	31,048.00
Natural Law	Ron Parker	365	1.29		0.00
Green	Andrew Van Iterson	349	1.23	−0.66	200.00
Communist	Malek Khouri	210	0.74		1,086.25
Independent	John C. Turmel	173	0.61	+0.08	0.00
Total valid votes		28,400	100.0	−6.72	
Total rejected ballots		317	1.10		
Turnout		28,717	63.88		
Eligible voters		44,958			
Source(s) "General Election of June 8 1995 — Summary of Valid Ballots by Candidate". Elections Ontario. "General Election of June 8 1995 — Statistical Summary". Elections Ontario. "1995 Summary of Income and Campaign Expenses" ( Word'95 .doc).

1990 Ontario general election
Party	Candidate	Votes	%	±%
New Democratic	Evelyn Gigantes	14,522	47.70	+7.64
Liberal	Richard Patten	11,656	38.28	−8.88
Progressive Conservative	Alex Burney	2,723	8.94	−1.8
Family Coalition	John Gray	809	2.66	
Green	Bill Hipwell	576	1.89	
Independent	John Turmel	160	0.53	−1.50
Total valid votes		30,446	100.0	+3.54

1987 Ontario general election
Party	Candidate	Votes	%	±%
Liberal	Richard Patten	13,867	47.16	+21.20
New Democratic	Evelyn Gigantes	11,780	40.06	−3.39
Progressive Conservative	Greg Vezina	3,159	10.74	−18.51
Independent	John Turmel	598	2.03	+0.70
Total valid votes		29,404	100.0	+7.46

1985 Ontario general election
Party	Candidate	Votes	%	±%
New Democratic	Evelyn Gigantes	11,890	43.45	+1.69
Progressive Conservative	Graham Bird	8,005	29.26	−0.77
Liberal	Pat Legris	7,103	25.96	−0.65
Independent	John Turmel	364	1.33	+0.87
Total valid votes		27,362	100.0	+39.95

Ontario provincial by-election, December 13, 1984
Party	Candidate	Votes	%	±%
New Democratic	Evelyn Gigantes	8,165	41.76	+4.99
Progressive Conservative	Graham Bird	5,870	30.02	−4.38
Liberal	Lowell Green	5,202	26.61	−0.73
Green	Greg Vezina	130	0.66	
Independent	Ray Joseph Cormier	94	0.48	
Independent	John Turmel	90	0.46	−1.02
Total valid votes		19,551	100.0	−22.83
By-election called following Michael Cassidy's resignation to run federally.

1981 Ontario general election
Party	Candidate	Votes	%	±%
New Democratic	Michael Cassidy	9,316	36.77	−4.79
Progressive Conservative	David Small	8,717	34.41	+2.25
Liberal	Karl Feige	6,926	27.34	+2.47
Independent	John Turmel	376	1.48	
Total valid votes		25,335	100.0	−0.91

1977 Ontario general election
Party	Candidate	Votes	%	±%
New Democratic	Michael Cassidy	10,626	41.56	+2.64
Progressive Conservative	Brian Cameron	8,223	32.16	−0.62
Liberal	Ian Kimmerly	6,358	24.87	−2.52
Communist	Marvin Glass	360	1.41	+0.5
Total valid votes		25,567	100.0	−6.64

1975 Ontario general election
Party	Candidate	Votes	%	±%
New Democratic	Michael Cassidy	11,658	38.92	+3.46
Progressive Conservative	Gale Kerwin	8,978	32.78	−1.88
Liberal	Gerald Kirby	7,500	27.39	−2.49
Communist	Marvin Glass	250	0.91	
Total valid votes		27,386	100.0	+20.26

1971 Ontario general election
Party	Candidate	Votes	%	±%
New Democratic	Michael Cassidy	8,075	35.46	+17.59
Progressive Conservative	Garry Guzzo	7,893	34.66	−4.4
Liberal	Rudy Capogreco	6,804	29.88	−13.19
Total valid votes		22,772	100.0	+27.57"1971 Ontario Election". Canadian Elections Database.</ref></ref>

1967 Ontario general election
Party	Candidate	Votes	%
Liberal	Harold MacKenzie	7,688	43.07
Progressive Conservative	Ivan Sparks	6,973	39.06
New Democratic	Ivan Greenberg	3,190	17.87
Total valid votes		17,851	100.0

== 2007 electoral reform referendum ==
2007 Ontario electoral reform referendum
Side	Votes	%
First Past the Post	26,586	52.1
Mixed Member Proportional	24,443	47.9
Total valid votes	51,029	100.0

== See also ==
- List of Ontario provincial electoral districts
- Canadian provincial electoral districts
- Ottawa Centre (federal electoral district)
