= Marc Adornato =

Contemporary Canadian artist

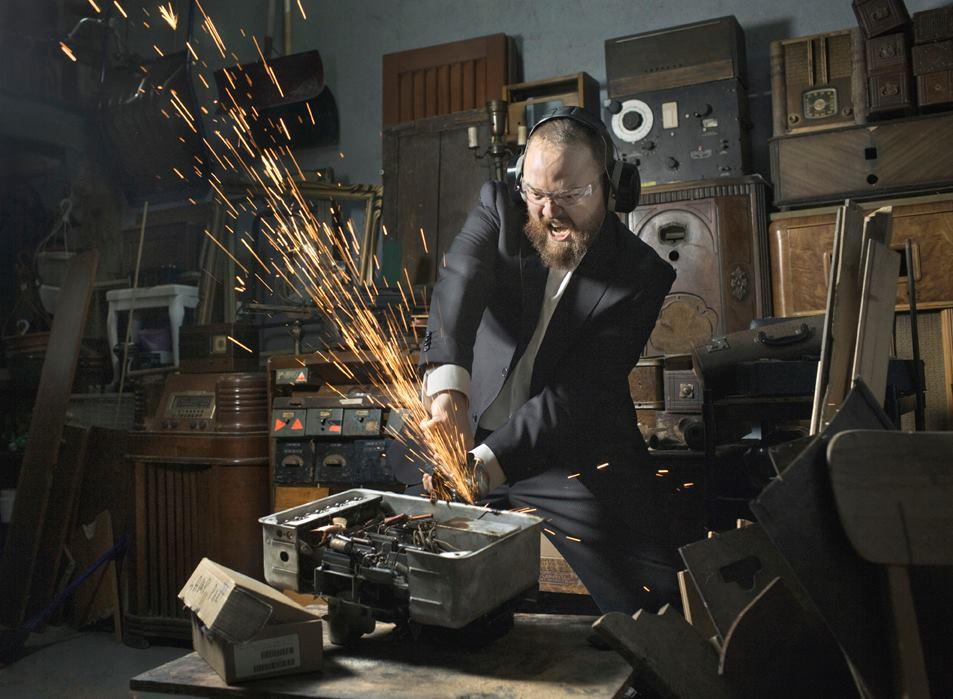
- Born: June 7, 1977 (age 48); Montreal, Quebec
- Known for: Satirical, provocative, sociopolitically engaged artwork
- Spouse: Urszula Adamik married 2012-14
- Website: http://www.adornato.com

Marc Adornato (born June 7, 1977) is a contemporary Canadian artist based in Ottawa, Ontario, working in a variety of mediums including painting, mixed media, video and performance. He is known for his satirical and subversive artwork that often involve socio-political issues such as climate change, terrorism, state surveillance, and wealth inequality.

== Early life and education ==
Adornato was born in Montreal, Quebec, in 1977. He spent his formative years (1982–1986) in Riyadh, Saudi Arabia with his family, before settling in Ottawa, Ontario, in 1990. In 2001, he completed a degree in Fine Art with a major in Media Art, from the Nova Scotia College of Art and Design in Halifax Nova Scotia.

== 2001–2009 ==
In 2001–2009, Adornato's work focused on "pro-cloning, sciences, politics and history" and concerned himself particularly with "la guerre et le clonage". Adornato produced a series of artworks entitled Anarchos Apokalypsis where he burned, shredded and "smashed shit to pieces" - then hung it in museums and galleries. Notable pieces from that era are his Canadian and American flags made with real Canadian currency he destroyed, entitled, United We Spend which was featured in the Weapons of Mass Dissemination: The Propaganda of War exhibit at the Canadian War Museum during the period from 2005–2006 over the course of his participation in The War Story Collective. Also included in this series were The Fish performance installation where he set a robotic singing fish on fire, Robo-Christ made from cheap disposable technology, and several video mash-ups including State of the Union and In God We Trust that address George W. Bush's war on Iraq. Tending to independent distribution, the artist's video mash-ups still reside on YouTube, and Adornato has spoken out publicly against traditional media outlets and voiced frequent challenges to public figures. His work has also been shown at the Bank of Canada's Currency Museum. During this period, Adornato self-identified as a "technophile" using "favourite newscasts, just as any artist works using a preferred brush or type of paint". His early works have been described as "an eclectic mix (and remix) of fantasy, comedy, parody and sharp socio-political commentary".

== 2010–2015, Assemblage work ==
In 2010, Adornato's artwork took on a distinctively different look that tended towards "assemblage". He began to work with antiquated materials from before the 1960s: everything from reclaimed barn wood, to radios, typewriters, cameras, sewing machines, to vintage fur pelts, antlers, and World War II-era gas masks. His hybrid assemblage/mash-up style continues to be prevalent in his current sculptural work. Recent notable creations are the Hunting Dissent series, which was the subject of a conflict with a local eatery when Adornato spoke out against an alleged copy of his work. The Hunting Dissent series, along with the dark-humored BlowUp Dolls, and the emerging train-derailment series Progress Derailed, are among those shown in many non-traditional venues in Ottawa.

== 2015–present day ==
=== #MYPROTEST ===
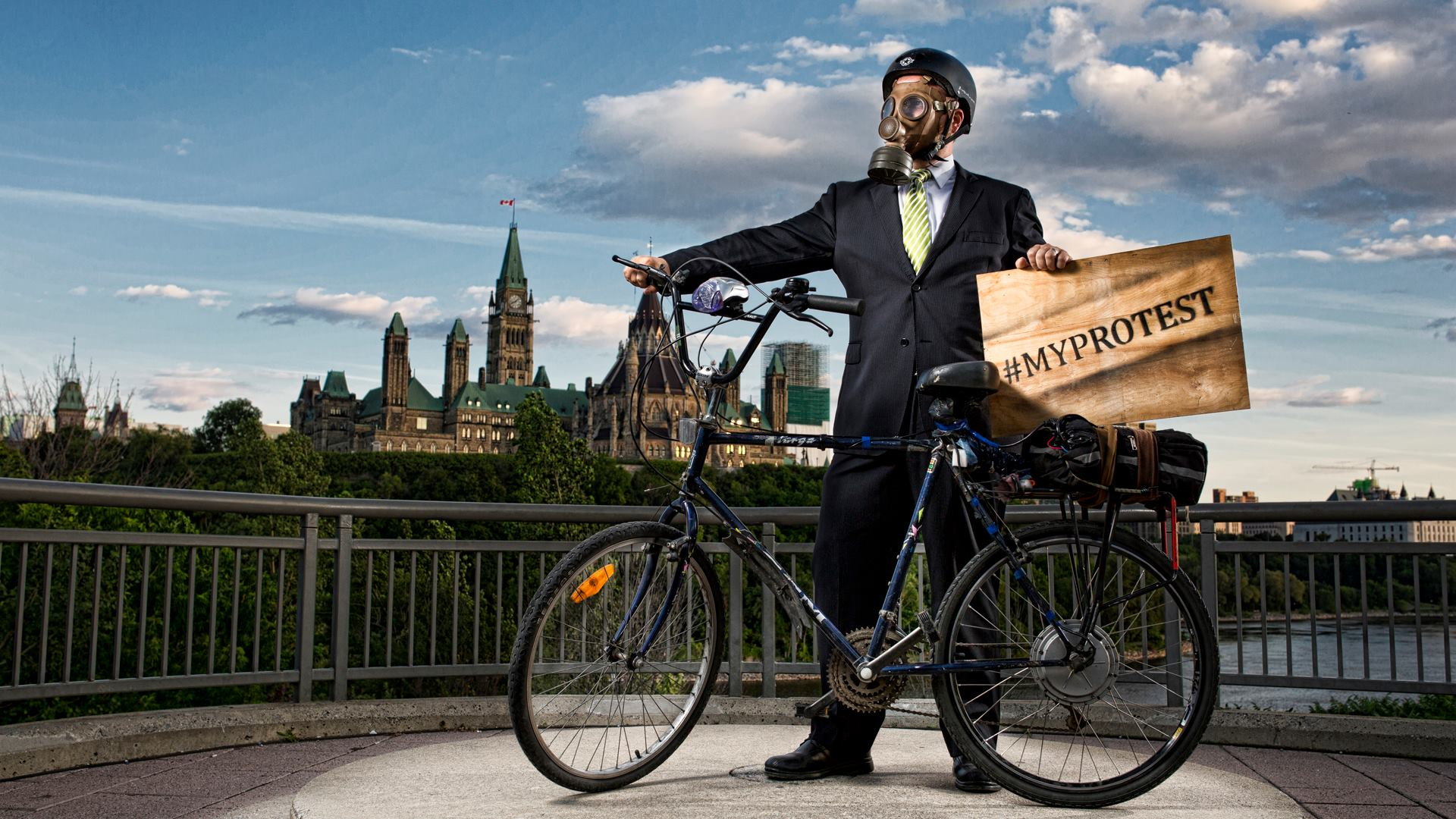
Adornato during the 2014-15 #MYPROTEST performance piece

2014-15 #MYPROTEST: In 2015, Adornato completed a year long performance-meets-protest in which the artists cycled through Ottawa on a self-constructed electric bike while wearing a gas mask. The piece existed in large part through the social media responses and subsequent public reactions that Adornato would capture and document, absorbing his audience's response into the documentary component of the piece itself. At its inception, #MYPROTEST utilized propaganda-inspired media tactics relaying messages of condemnation on the subjects of GMOs, wealth inequality, student debt and surveillance culture. The project continues to reside in video form on YouTube, and features music by indie pop band Hilotrons An ATIPS (access to information privacy) request placed by the artist uncovered mention of an RCMP investigation, evidence of the incendiary nature of the more protest based works.

=== RBC Painting Competition series ===
Adornato received attention across Canada and into the US for his 2015 RBC Painting competition submission titled Arbie Goes Rogue.

The painting, Adornato's first, depicts a Royal Bank of Canada building on fire, with the RBC mascot 'Arbie' holding a sign saying "iProtest". In a press release statement about the painting Adornato wrote, "It is wonderful to see that RBC has thrown some of their spare change into the hats of a few emerging Canadian painters over the past few years...I do hope my painting wins the $25,000 reward for the 2015 RBC Canadian Painting Competition. After being taxed on almost half of that, I will be able to put the rest towards my student loans, and RBC's outrageous banking, brokerage, mutual funds, and credit card fees." Receiving heavy media coverage, the piece incited responses from outlets all over the country.

=== Ruined landscapes ===
In June 2016 this ongoing series of twenty five paintings was first exhibited in the Ottawa Art Gallery. During this show titled "I've Got Some Bad News" Adornato first displayed the collection alongside a retrospective of previous assemblage and sculptural works dating back as far as 2009. Adornato's artist statement referenced the Group of Seven's repeated depiction of the "pristine Canadian Landscape." With his typically satirical bent, Adornato stated:

100 years later, I've created contemporary artworks that reflects the new Canadian landscape, and embody Canadian philosopher Marshall McLuhan's phrase 'the medium is the message' by actually ruining other people's landscape paintings with toxic accidents.

'Ruined Landscapes' is a new painting series where I am 'hijacking' vintage landscape paintings found in thrift stores and antique shops, and painting in hazmat cleanup crews and man-made environmental disasters. Many of the painting titles are appropriated from actual news headlines from real accidents that have occurred throughout the Canadian landscape. Train derailments, fuel truck rollovers, oil tankers running aground and illegal chemical dumping are just some of the toxic accidents reflected in these truly Canadian landscape paintings."

== Select exhibitions and collections of note ==
Adornato's artwork has been in numerous exhibits, most recently the Ruined Landscapes series displayed in 2016 at the Ottawa Art Gallery in a salon style show that packed the house titled "I've got some bad news". Pieces in this collection are now part of numerous public and private collections including the City of Ottawa Art Collection, and individual collections of Canadian singer-songwriter Jim Bryson, Bridgehead founder Tracey Clark, and owner of the former Byward Market nightclub Zaphod Beeblebrox, Eugene Haslam. His work has also appeared in The Julian Garner Greyarea Gallery, the Canadian War Museum, Weapons of Mass Dissemination: The Propaganda of War, The Bank of Canada's Currency Museum, Sacred Money, Damned Money and appears frequently in non-traditional locations including restaurants and the artist's own renegade installs. The artist is rumoured to be working on a new series to be released in 2020 titled "Dystopia Rising".
