= List of Ontario CCF/NDP members =

This is a list of members of the Ontario Co-operative Commonwealth Federation (CCF) and its successor, the Ontario New Democratic Party (NDP), social democratic political parties in Ontario, Canada.

== Current and former CCF/NDP members of the Ontario legislature ==
=== First elected in 1934 ===
The CCF won one of the 90 seats available in the Legislative Assembly of Ontario in the 1934 provincial election:

- Samuel Lawrence; Hamilton East elected 1934, def. 1937, Mayor of Hamilton 1944-1949

In the 1937 election no CCFers were elected.

=== First elected in 1943 ===
The CCF won 34 of the 90 seats available in the 1943 election:

- Rae Luckock; Bracondale (Oakwood, Toronto) 1943-1945; 1st (tied with Macphail) woman elected to Ontario Legislature
- Charles Strange; Brantford 1943-1945
- John Kehoe; Cochrane North 1943-1945
- Bill Grummett; Cochrane South 1943-1945-1948-1951-1955
- Arthur Nelson Alles; Essex North 1943-1945 (resigned from CCF caucus in 1945 to sit as Independent Labour, did not run in 1945)
- Robert Thornberry; Hamilton Centre 1943-1945, 1948–1951
- Frederick Wilson Warren; Hamilton-Wentworth 1943-1945
- Garfield Anderson; Fort William 1943—1945-1948
- William Herbert Connor; Hamilton East 1943-1945
- William Docker; Kenora 1943-1945-1948
- Harry Steel; Lambton West 1943-1945
- Cyril Overall; Niagara Falls 1943-1945
- Arthur Casselman; Nipissing 1943-1945
- Arthur Henry Williams; Ontario (Durham) 1943-1945
- Elmer Smith; Parry Sound 1943-1945
- Frederick Oliver Robinson; Port Arthur 1943-1945-1948-1951
- George Edward Lockhart; Rainy River 1943-1945
- Leslie Wismer; Riverdale 1943-1945, 1948–1951
- William Dennison; St. David 1943-1945, 1948–1951
- George Isaac Harvey; Sault Ste Marie 1943-1945-1948-1951
- Robert Carlin; Sudbury 1943-1945-1948
- Calvin Taylor; Timiskaming 1943-1945-1948-1951
- John Henry Cook; Waterloo North 1943-1945
- Grieve Robinson; Waterloo South 1943-1945
- Howard Elis Brown; Welland 1943-1945
- Leslie Hancock; Wellington South 1943-1945 (resigned from CCF caucus in 1944 to sit as Independent Farmer-Labour, did not run in 1945)
- William Robertson; Wentworth 1943-1945-1948
- George Bennett; Windsor Sandwich 1943-1945
- William Riggs; Windsor Walkerville 1943-1945
- Bertram Leavens; Woodbine 1943-1945, 1948–1951
- Agnes Campbell Macphail; York East (East York) 1943-1945 (defeated), 1948–1951 (defeated) first female MPP sworn in, tied with Luckock as first woman elected to legislature
- George Herbert Mitchell; York North 1943-1945
- Ted Jolliffe; York South 1943-1945, 1948–1951 (CCF leader, 1942-1953)
- Charles Millard; York West 1943-1945, 1948–1951

=== First elected in 1945 ===
The CCF won 8 of the 90 seats available in the 1945 election:

=== First elected in 1948 ===
The CCF won 21 of the 90 seats available in the 1948 election:

- Reid Scott; Beaches 1948-1951, later NDP MP
- Harry Walters; Bracondale (Oakwood) 1948-1951
- George Eamon Park; Dovercourt 1948-1951
- Gordon Bennett Ellis; Essex North 1948-1951
- John Dowling; Hamilton East 1948-1951
- William Temple; High Park 1948-1951
- T.D. Thomas; Ontario (Durham) 1948-1951-1955, Oshawa 1955-1959-1963
- Lloyd Fell; Parkdale 1948-1951
- Theodore Isley; Waterloo South 1948-1951
- Joseph Lees Easton; Wentworth 1948-1951

=== First elected in 1951 ===
The CCF won two of the 90 seats available in the 1951 election:

=== First elected in 1955 ===
The CCF won 3 of the 90 seats available in the 1955 election:

- Reg Gisborn; Wentworth East 1955-1959-1963-1967, Hamilton East 1967-1971-1975 (retired, NDP won)
- Donald Cameron MacDonald; York South 1955-1959-1963-1967-1971-1975-1977-1981-1982by (gave up seat for Bob Rae, NDP won) (CCF/NDP leader, 1953-1970)

=== First elected in 1959 ===
The CCF won five of the 98 seats available in the 1959 election:

- Norman Andrew Davison; Hamilton East 1959-1963-1967, Hamilton Centre 1967-1971-1975
- Kenneth Bryden; Woodbine 1959-1963-1967 (retired, NDP won)

=== First elected in 1963 ===
The NDP won 7 of the 108 seats available in the 1963 election:

- Stephen Lewis; Scarborough West 1963-1967-1971-1975-1977-1978by (retired, NDP won) (NDP leader, 1970-1978)
- Fred Young; Yorkview (North York) 1963-1967-1971-1975-1977-1981, United Church Minister, former North York Alderman

=== First elected in 1964 ===
The NDP won a seat available in a 1964 by-election:

- Jim Renwick; lawyer; Riverdale 1964by-1967-1971-1975-1977-1981-1984 (died in 1984, NDP won)

=== First elected in 1967 ===
The NDP won 20 of the 117 seats available in the 1967 election:

- John L. Brown; Beaches-Woodbine 1967-1971
- Donald Jackson; Timiskaming 1967-1971
- Mac Makarchuk - Brantford 1967-1971, 1975-1977-1981
- Bill Ferrier; Cochrane South 1967-1971-1975-1977
- Morton Shulman; High Park 1967-1971-1975 (retired, NDP won)
- Patrick Lawlor; Lakeshore 1967-1971-1975-1977-1981
- Clifford George Pilkey; Oshawa 1967-1971
- Walter Pitman; former MP; Peterborough 1967-1971, NDP MP for Peterborough 60-62, & former Ontario NDP leadership candidate
- Margaret Renwick; Scarborough Centre 1967-1971
- Elie Martel; Sudbury East 1967-1971-1975-1977-1981-1985-1987 (retired, NDP won)
- John Edward Stokes; Thunder Bay 1967-1971-1975, Lake Nipigon 1975-1977-1981-1985 (retired, NDP won)
- Ian Deans; Wentworth 1967-1971-1975-1977-1979by, NDP MP for Hamilton Mountain 1984-1986
- Fred Burr; Sandwich-Riverside 1967-1975, Windsor Riverside 1975-1977 (retired, NDP won)
- Hugh Peacock; Windsor West 1967-1971 (retired, NDP won)

=== First elected in 1969 ===
The NDP won a seat available in a 1969 by-election:

- Archdeacon Kenneth Bolton; Middlesex South 1969by-1971

=== First elected in 1971 ===
The NDP won 19 of the 117 seats available in the 1971 election:

- Floyd Laughren; Nickel Belt 1971-1975-1977-1981-1985-1987-1990-1995-1998by (retired, NDP won)
- Michael Cassidy; Ottawa Centre 1971-1975-1977-1981-1984by (ran federally, NDP won), (NDP leader, 1978-1982)
- Jan Dukszta; Parkdale 1971-1975-1977-1981 (ran, NDP defeated)
- James Francis Foulds; Port Arthur 1971-1975-1977-1981-1985-1987
- Bud Germa; former MP; Sudbury 1971-1975-1977-1981, former NDP MP 1967-1968 for Sudbury
- Ted Bounsall; Windsor West 1971-1975, Windsor Sandwich 1975-1977-1981

=== First elected in 1974 ===
The NDP won a seat available in a 1974 by-election:

- George Samis; Stormont 1974by-1975, Cornwall 1975-1977-1981-1985

=== First elected in 1975 ===
The NDP won 38 of the 125 seats available in the 1975 election:

- Bud Wildman; Algoma 1975-1977-1981-1985-1987-1990-1995-1999 (retired, NDP lost)
- Marion Bryden; Beaches-Woodbine 1975-1977-1981-1985-1987-1990 (retired, NDP won)
- Ross McClellan; Bellwoods 1975-1977-1981-1985-1987
- Monty Davidson; Cambridge 1975-1977-1981
- Evelyn Gigantes; Carleton East 1975-1977-1981, Ottawa Centre 1984by-1985-1987, 1990-1995 (ran, NDP lost)
- Antonio Lupusella; Dovercourt 1975-1977-1981-1985-1986 (lost NDP Nomination, became a Liberal, MPP till 1990)
- Odoardo Di Santo; Downsview 1975-1977-1981-1985 (ran, NDP lost),
- Douglas Moffatt; Durham East 1975-1977
- Charles Godfrey; Durham West 1975-1977
- Edward Philip; Etobicoke 1975-1977-1981-1985-1987, Etobicoke-Rexdale 1987-1990-1995 (ran, NDP lost)
- Iain Angus; Fort William 1975-1977
- Michael Norman Davison; Hamilton Centre 1975-1977-1981 (ran, NDP lost), 1984by-1985 (ran, NDP lost)
- Bob Warren Mackenzie; Hamilton East 1975-1977-1981-1985-1987-1990-1995 (retired, NDP lost)
- Ed Ziemba; High Park-Swansea 1975-1977-1981 (ran, NDP lost)
- Anthony Grande; Oakwood 1975-1977-1981-1985-1987 (ran, NDP lost)
- Michael Breaugh; Oshawa 1975-1977-1981-1985-1987-1990 (ran Federally, NDP won), former NDP MP for Oshawa 1990-1993
- Gillian Sandeman; Peterborough 1975-1977
- David Warner; Scarborough Ellesmere 1975-1977-1981, 1985–1987, 1990-1995 (ran, NDP lost)
- Robert Bain; Timiskaming 1975-1977
- Mel Swart; Welland-Thorold 1975-1977-1981-1985-1987-1988by (?, NDP won)

=== First elected in 1977 ===
The NDP won 33 of the 125 seats available in the 1977 election:

- Brian Charlton; Hamilton Mountain 1977-1981-1985-1987-1990-1995 (ran, NDP lost)
- Dave Cooke; Windsor Riverside 1977-1981-1985-1987-1990-1995-1998by (retired, NDP won)

=== First elected in 1979 ===
The NDP won two seat in a 1979 by-elections:

- Colin Isaacs - Wentworth 1979by-1981 (ran, NDP lost)
- Richard Johnston; Scarborough West 1979by-1981-1985-1987-1990 (retired, NDP won)

=== First elected in 1981 ===
The NDP won 21 of the 125 seats available in the 1981 election.

=== First elected in 1982 ===
The NDP won two seats in 1982 by-elections:

- Richard Alexander Allen; Hamilton West 1982by-1985-1987-1990-1995 (ran, NDP lost)
- Bob Rae; York South 1982by-1985-1987-1990-1995-1996by (retired, NDP lost) (NDP leader, 1982-1996, later a Liberal MP and leader)

=== First elected in 1985 ===
The NDP won 25 of the 125 seats available in the 1985 election:

- Patrick Michael Hayes - Essex North 1985-1987, Essex-Kent 1990-1995 (ran, NDP lost)
- David Reville; Riverdale 1985-1987-1990 (retired, NDP won)
- Ruth Grier; Lakeshore 1985-1987, Etobicoke Lakeshore 1987-1990-1995 (ran, NDP lost)
- Gilles Pouliot; Lake Nipigon 1985-1987-1990-1995-1999 (retired, NDP lost)
- Karl Morin-Strom; Sault Ste Marie 1985-1987-1990 (retired, NDP won)
- David Ramsay; Timiskaming 1985-1986* (switched to Liberal Party in 1986, retired 2011)

=== First elected in 1987 ===
The NDP won 19 of the 130 seats available in the 1987 election:

- Mike Farnan - Cambridge 1987-1990-1995 (ran, NDP lost)
- Howard Hampton; Rainy River 1987-1990-1995-1999, Kenora Rainy River 1999-2003–2007-2011 (retired, NDP won) (NDP leader, 1996-2009)
- Shelley Martel; Sudbury East 1987-1990-1995-1999, Nickle Belt 1999-2003-2007 (retired, NDP won France Gélinas)

=== First elected in 1988 ===
The NDP won a seat in a 1988 by-election:

- Peter Kormos; Welland Thorold 1988by-1990-1995-1999, Niagara Centre 1999-2003–2007-2011 (retired, NDP won)

=== First elected in 1990 ===
The NDP won 74 of the 130 seats available in the 1990 election:

- Frances Lankin - Beaches-Woodbine 1990-1995-1999, Beaches-East York 1999-2001by (retired, NDP won)
- Bradley Ward - Brantford 1990-1995 (ran, NDP lost)
- Randy Hope - Chatham-Kent 1990-1995 (ran, NDP lost)
- Len Wood - Cochrane North 1990-1995-1999 (ridings merged, ran in Timiskaming, NDP lost)
- Gilles Bisson - Cochrane South 1990-1995-1999, Timmins-James Bay 1999-2003–2007-2011-2014-2018-2022 (def.)
- Margery Ward - Don Mills 1990-1993by (died of cancer, NDP lost)
- Tony Silipo; Dovercourt 1990-1995-1999 (ran, NDP lost)
- Anthony Perruzza; Downsview 1990-1995 (ran, NDP lost),
- Drummond White; Durham Centre 1990-1995 (ran, NDP lost)
- Gord Mills; Durham East 1990-1995 (ran, NDP lost)
- James Wiseman; Durham West 1990-1995 (ran, NDP lost)
- Larry O'Connor; Durham-York 1990-1995 (ran, NDP lost),
- Peter North; Elgin 1990-1993 (quit NDP, sat as independent till 1999)
- Rosario Marchese; Fort York 1990-1995-1999, Trinity Spadina 1999-2003–2007-2011-2014 (ran, NDP lost)
- Fred Wilson; Frontenac-Addington 1990-1995 (ran, NDP lost)
- Derek Fletcher; Guelph 1990-1995 (ran, NDP lost)
- Noel Duignan; Halton North 1990-1995 (ran, NDP lost)
- David Christopherson; Hamilton Centre 1990-1995-1999, Hamilton West 1999-2003 (retired, NDP lost)
- Elmer Buchanan; Hastings Peterborough 1990-1995 (ran, NDP lost)
- Elaine Ziemba; High Park-Swansea 1990-1995 (ran, NDP lost)
- Paul Klopp; Huron 1990-1995 (ran, NDP lost)
- Gary Wilson; Kingston and the Islands 1990-1995 (ran, NDP lost)
- Will Ferguson; Kitchener 1990-1995 (did not run, NDP lost)
- Mike Cooper; Kitchener Wilmot 1990-1995 (ran, NDP lost)
- Ron Hansen; Lincoln 1990-1995 (ran, NDP lost)
- Marion Boyd; London Centre 1990-1995-1999 (ran, NDP lost)
- David Winninger; London South 1990-1995 (ran, NDP lost)
- Irene Mathyssen; Middlesex 1990-1995 (ran, NDP lost)
- Ellen MacKinnon; Lambton 1990-1995 (did not run, NDP lost)
- Dan Waters; Muskoka-Georgian Bay 1990-1995 (ran, NDP lost),
- Margaret Harrington; Niagara Falls 1990-1995 (ran, NDP lost)
- Shirley Coppen; Niagara South 1990-1995 (ran, NDP lost)
- Norman Jamison; Norfolk 1990-1995 (ran, NDP lost)
- Tony Rizzo; Oakwood 1990
- Allan Pilkey; Oshawa 1990-1995 (ran, NDP lost)
- Kimble Sutherland; Oxford 1990-1995 (ran, NDP lost)
- Karen Haslam; Perth 1990-1995 (ran, NDP lost)
- Jenny Carter; Peterborough 1990-1995 (ran, NDP lost)
- Paul R. Johnson; Prince Edward-Lennox 1990-1995 (ran, NDP lost)
- Shelley Wark-Martyn; Port Arthur 1990-1995 (ran, NDP lost)
- Marilyn Churley; Riverdale 1990-1995-1999, Broadview Greenwood 1999-2003, Toronto Danforth 2003-2005 (retired, NDP won)
- Zanana Akande; St. Andrew's-St. Patrick 1990-1994
- Christel Haeck; St. Catharines-Brock 1990-1995 (ran, NDP lost)
- Bob Huget; Sarnia 1990-1995 (ran, NDP lost)
- Tony Martin; Sault Ste Marie 1990-1995-1999-2003 (ran, NDP lost), NDP MP Sault Ste Marie 2004–2011
- Stephen Owens; Scarborough Centre 1990-1995 (ran, NDP lost)
- Bob Frankford; doctor; Scarborough East 1990-1995 (ran, NDP lost)
- Anne Swarbrick; Scarborough West 1990-1995 (ran, NDP lost),
- Paul Wessenger; Simcoe Centre 1990-1995 (ran, NDP lost)
- Sharon Murdock; Sudbury 1990-1995 (ran, NDP lost)
- Mark Morrow; Wentworth East 1990-1995 (ran, NDP lost)
- Donald Abel; Wentworth North 1990-1995 (ran, NDP lost)
- Dennis Drainville; Victoria-Haliburton 1990-1993by (quit, NDP lost), Anglican priest
- George Dadamo; Windsor Sandwich 1990-1995 (did not run, NDP lost)
- Wayne Lessard; Windsor Walkerville 1990-1995 (ran, NDP lost), Windsor-Riverside 1998by-1999
- Gary Malkowski; York East (East York) 1990-1995 (ran, NDP lost),
- Giorgio Mammoliti; Yorkview 1990-1995 (ran, NDP lost), Toronto City Councillor

=== First elected in 1995 ===
The NDP won 17 of the 130 seats available in the 1995 election.

=== First elected in 1998 ===
The NDP won two seats in 1998 by-elections:

- Blain Morin; Nickle Belt 1998by-1999 (Ridings Merged, Did not seek nomination)
- Alex Cullen; Ottawa West 1997by-1998*-1999 (ran NDP lost)

(elected as a Liberal in 1997, he switched to the NDP in 1998 after losing nomination), Ottawa City Councillor

=== First elected in 1999 ===
The NDP won 9 of the 103 seats available in the 1999 election.

=== First elected in 2001 ===
The NDP won a seat in a 2001 by-election:

- Michael Prue; Beaches-East York 2001by-2003–2007-2011-2014 (ran, lost), former mayor of East York

=== First elected in 2003 ===
The NDP won 7 of the 103 seats available in the 2003 election.

=== First elected in 2004 ===
The NDP won a seat in a 2004 by-election:

- Andrea Horwath (NDP leader, 2009–2022); Hamilton East 2004by-2007-2011-2014–2018-2022, (Resigned August 15, 2022 to run for Mayor of Hamilton) former Hamilton City Councillor

=== First elected in 2006 ===
The NDP won a seat, and retained one that they already held, in 2006 by-elections:

- Peter Tabuns; Toronto-Danforth 2006by-2007-2011-2014–2018-2022-2025–present, former Toronto City Councillor/frm Head of Greenpeace, interim NDP leader and leader of the opposition (2022-2023)
- Cheri DiNovo; Parkdale-High Park 2006by-2007-2011-2014–2018, (retired, NDP won) United Church Minister

=== First elected in 2007 ===
The NDP picked up one seat in a by-election, but lost it in the general election. Two MPPs resigned and their seats were retained in the general election in which the NDP won 10 seats, the same number as in the 2003 election. However the size of the legislature increased in this election from 103 to 107 seats.

- Paul Ferreira, York South—Weston, Februaryby-October 2007 (def.)
- France Gélinas, Nickel Belt, 2007-2011–2014–2018-2022-2025-present
- Paul Miller, Hamilton East—Stoney Creek, 2007-2011–2014–2018-2022 (expelled from NDP 2022, ran as Independent, defeated, NDP lost)

=== First elected in 2011 ===
The NDP won 17 seats (out of 107) for a net gain of 7.

- Teresa Armstrong, London—Fanshawe, 2011-2014–2018-2022–2025-present
- Sarah Campbell, Kenora—Rainy River, 2011-2014–2018 (ret., NDP lost)
- Cindy Forster, Welland, 2011-2014–2018 (ret., riding dissolved)
- Michael Mantha, Algoma—Manitoulin, 2011-2014–2018-2022–2023 (expelled from NDP caucus 2023, ret. 2025, NDP lost)
- Taras Natyshak, Essex, 2011-2014–2018-2022 (ret., NDP lost)
- Jonah Schein, Davenport, 2011-2014 (def.)
- Jagmeet Singh, Bramalea—Gore—Malton, 2011-2014–2017 (resigned to become leader of the federal NDP, riding abolished)
- Monique Taylor, Hamilton Mountain, 2011-2014–2018-2022–2025-present
- John Vanthof, Timiskaming—Cochrane, 2011-2014–2018-2022–2025-present

=== First elected in 2012 ===
The NDP picked up 1 seat in a by-election, increasing their total to 18.

- Catherine Fife, Kitchener—Waterloo, 2012by-2014–2018-2022–2025-present

=== First elected in 2013 ===
The NDP picked up 2 seats in by-election, increasing their total to 20.

- Peggy Sattler, London West, 2013by-2014–2018-2022-2025-present
- Percy Hatfield, Windsor—Tecumseh, 2013by-2014-2018-2022 (ret., NDP lost)

=== First elected in 2014 ===
The NDP picked up one seat in a by-election, which was retained in that year's general election, increasing their total to 21. In the general election, 3 seats were gained and 3 seats were lost resulting in no net change. One of the newly elected MPPs, however, resigned later the same year after just six months in office, and the party lost the resulting by-election.

- Wayne Gates, Niagara Falls, 2014by-2014–2018-2022–2025-present
- Jennifer French, Oshawa, 2014–2018-2022–2025–present
- Lisa Gretzky, Windsor West, 2014–2018-2022–2025–present
- Joe Cimino, Sudbury, 2014 (resigned 5 months after the election, NDP lost by-election)

=== First elected in 2018 ===
The NDP picked up 22 seats to become the Official Opposition, with 40 seats

- Joel Harden, Ottawa Centre, 2018–2022–2025 (ret., NDP won)
- Ian Arthur, Kingston and the Islands, 2018–2022 (ret., NDP lost)
- Sara Singh, Brampton Centre, 2018–2022 (def.)
- Gurratan Singh, Brampton East, 2018–2022 (def.)
- Kevin Yarde, Brampton North, 2018–2022 (lost nomination, NDP lost)
- Doly Begum, Scarborough Southwest, 2018–2022–2025-2026
- Rima Berns-McGown, Beaches—East York, 2018–2022 (ret., NDP lost)
- Marit Stiles, Davenport, 2018–2022–2025–present, NDP leader since 2023
- Bhutila Karpoche, Parkdale—High Park, 2018–2022–2025 (ret., NDP won)
- Chris Glover, Spadina—Fort York, 2018–2022–2025–present
- Suze Morrison, Toronto Centre, 2018–2022 (ret., NDP won)
- Jill Andrew, Toronto—St. Paul's, 2018–2022–2025 (def.)
- Jessica Bell, University—Rosedale, 2018–2022–2025–present
- Tom Rakocevic, Humber River—Black Creek, 2018–2022–2025–present
- Faisal Hassan, York South—Weston, 2018–2022 (def.)
- Sandy Shaw, Hamilton West—Ancaster—Dundas, 2018–2022–2025–present
- Jeff Burch, Niagara Centre, 2018–2022–2025–present
- Jennie Stevens, St. Catharines, 2018–2022–2025–present
- Laura Mae Lindo, Kitchener Centre, 2018–2022–2023 (res., NDP lost by-election)
- Terence Kernaghan, London North Centre, 2018–2022–2025–present
- Guy Bourgouin, Mushkegowuk—James Bay, 2018–2022–2025–present
- Jamie West, Sudbury, 2018–2022–2025–present

=== First elected in 2022 ===
The NDP was returned as the Official Opposition, with 31 seats, nine fewer than in 2018. Three new MPPs were elected:

- Chandra Pasma, Ottawa West—Nepean, 2022–2025–present
- Kristyn Wong-Tam, Toronto Centre, 2022–2025–present
- Lise Vaugeois, Thunder Bay—Superior North, 2022–2025–present

=== First elected in 2023 ===
The NDP elected one MPP in a by-election to replace former NDP leader Andrea Horwath who resigned her seat to run for Mayor of Hamilton.

- Sarah Jama, Hamilton Centre, March—October 2023 (expelled from NDP caucus and sat as Independent, defeated 1995 by NDP candidate)

=== First elected in 2025 ===
The NDP was returned as the Official Opposition under new leader Marit Stiles and elected 27 MPPs in the 2025 Ontario general election. Three new MPPs were elected:

- Catherine McKenney, Ottawa Centre, 2025—present
- Alexa Gilmour, Parkdale—High Park, 2025—present
- Robin Lennox, Hamilton Centre, 2025—present

=== First elected in 2026 ===
The NDP held 1 seat in a by-election, increasing their total to 27.

- Fatima Shaban, Scarborough Southwest, 2026—present

== Prominent Ontario CCF/NDP members and organizers ==
1930/1940s

- Elmore Philpott - president of the Ontario Association of CCF Club, 1933–1934
- Graham Spry - League for Social Reconstruction/CCF organizer and Ontario CCF vice-president
- Frank Underhill - League for Social Reconstruction/CCF organizer
- F.R. Scott - League for Social Reconstruction/CCF organizer
- John Mitchell, president of the Ontario CCF (1934-1941) and Hamilton alderman
- Murray Cotterill - prominent organizer and Ontario CCF leadership candidate in 1942
- Lister Sinclair - CCF speechwriter
- George Grube- Ontario CCF president (1944-1946)
- Lewis Duncan - Former Toronto City councillor & Ontario CCF leadership challenger in 1946
- Bill White - First African-Canadian to run for provincial or federal office in Canada.

1950s

- Miller Stewart - Ontario CCF president
- Douglas Campbell (Toronto politician) - candidate for party positions

1970s

- Michael Lewis - organizer and provincial secretary
- Gerald Caplan - advisor to Stephen Lewis, director of research in the late 1990s

1980s

- Ian Orenstein - former Ontario NDP leadership challenger, comic book artist

1990s

- Alex Munter - long-time NDP member, former candidate, Head of Canadians for Equal Marriage,
- Sheila White - NDP strategist & candidate
- Tarek Fatah - long-time NDP member, former candidate, Host of TV show Muslim Chronicle - subsequently a Liberal and later endorsed Stephen Harper's Conservatives
- Jamey Heath - organizer and candidate

== Prominent NDP candidates & past candidates ==
2011 election

- Cathy Crowe - street nurse and social activist
- James Gordon - singer, songwriter (also ran in 2014)
- Celia Ross - academic (also ran in 2014)
- Steve Mantis - advocate for injured workers

2003 election

- Earl Manners - Head of Ontario Secondary School Teachers Union

1995 election

- Brent Hawkes - Reverend Metropolitan Community Church, gay activist

1987 election

- Judy Rebick - Founder of Rabble.ca, feminist

== Prominent NDPers/CCFers at the municipal level ==
=== Toronto ===
- David Miller - Mayor of Toronto 2003–2010
- William Dennison - Mayor of Toronto 1966-1972
- James Simpson - Mayor of Toronto 1935
- Gus Harris - Reeve of Scarborough Township 1956; Mayor of Scarborough 1978-1988
- True Davidson - Reeve and later Mayor of East York 1960-1971. Originally a CCFer, later a Liberal.
- Ford Brand - Controller on Toronto City Council (1951-1958), ran second in the 1958 Toronto mayoral election.
- Maria Augimeri - long-time NDP City Councillor for North York & Toronto
- Howard Moscoe - long-time NDP City Councillor for North York & Toronto
- Joe Pantalone - long-time NDP City Councillor in Toronto
- Pam McConnell - long-time NDP City Councillor in Toronto
- Sandra Bussin - long-time NDP City Councillor in Toronto
- Joe Mihevc - long-time NDP City Councillor in Toronto
- Reid Scott - Toronto alderman from 1969 to 1976, former CCF MPP and NDP Member of Parliament
- Janet Davis - NDP City Councillor in Toronto
- Anthony Perruzza - NDP City Councillor in Toronto
- Gord Perks - NDP City Councillor in Toronto
- Paula Fletcher - NDP City Councillor in Toronto, Former leader of Manitoba Communist Party
- Adam Giambrone - NDP City Councillor and federal party president
- Jack Layton - Former NDP Toronto City Councillor (later MP and party leader)
- Olivia Chow - Former NDP Toronto City Councillor (later MP, currently mayor)
- Barbara Hall - former NDP Toronto City Councillor, later 'Liberal' Mayor of Toronto
- Dan Heap - Former NDP Toronto City Councillor (also frm NDP MP)
- Irene Jones - Former NDP Toronto City Councillor
- Dan Leckie - Former long-time NDP Toronto City Councillor
- David Robertson - Ontario MPP
- Martin Silva - Former long-time NDP Toronto City Councillor
- Fred Young Former NDP North York City Councillor (also frm NDP MPP)
- Irene Atkinson - Toronto School Board Trustee (Parkdale-High Park)
- Sheila Cary-Meagher - Toronto School Board Trustee (Beaches-East York)
- Stephnie Payne - longtime Toronto School Board Trustee (York West)
- Maria Rodriques - Toronto School Board Trustee Davenport 2003–present
- Cathy Dandy - Toronto School Board Trustee Toronto Danforth 2006–2014
- Rick Telfer - former School Board Trustee (Toronto-Danforth, Ward 15) 2003-2006
- John Campey - frm longtime School Board Trustee & NDP Organizer
- John Doherty - frm Toronto School Board Trustee
- Bob Spencer - frm Toronto School Board Trustee
- Sheila Lambrinos - frm North York School Board Trustee
- Errol Young - frm North York School Board Trustee
- Pat Collie - frm Scarborough School Board Trustee
- Catherine Leblanc-Miller - Toronto Catholic School Trustee
- Maria Rizzo - Toronto Catholic School Trustee

== See also ==
- List of articles about CCF/NDP members
- List of articles about British Columbia CCF/NDP members
- List of articles about Alberta CCF/NDP members
- List of articles about Saskatchewan CCF/NDP members
- List of articles about Manitoba CCF/NDP members
- List of articles about Nova Scotia CCF/NDP members
- List of articles about Yukon NDP members
