= Ontario New Democratic Party candidates in the 1967 Ontario provincial election =

This is a list of candidates for the Ontario New Democratic Party in the 1967 Ontario general election. The ONDP ran candidates in all of the province's 117 ridings; 20 of whom were elected.

== Central Ontario ==
Riding	Candidate's Name	Notes	Residence	Occupation	Votes	%	Rank
Dufferin–Simcoe	William Shannon				1,943		3rd
Hastings	Sydney Rodger				1,374		3rd
Northumberland	Joseph Gabovic				1,066		3rd
Peterborough	Walter Pitman	Member of Parliament for Peterborough (1960–1962)		Teacher	15,432		1st
Simcoe Centre	Robert Dennis				1,686		3rd
Simcoe East	Gordon Stanley				3,208		3rd
Victoria—Haliburton	Mervin Everall				3,384		3rd

== Eastern Ontario/Ottawa ==
Riding	Candidate's Name	Notes	Residence	Occupation	Votes	%	Rank
Carleton	David Bell				3,404		3rd
Carleton East	Elaine Lund				1,075		3rd
Frontenac—Addington	Ian Stewart				2,285		3rd
Glengarry	Thomas Aitken				745		3rd
Grenville–Dundas	Rene Benoit				475		3rd
Kingston and the Islands	John Meister				3,617		3rd
Lanark	Axel Sjoberg				921		3rd
Leeds	Paul Langley				895		3rd
Ottawa Centre	Irvin Greenberg				3,190		3rd
Ottawa East	Frederick Cote				1,263		3rd
Ottawa South	William Hardy				2,531		3rd
Ottawa West	Julian Gwyn				6,266		3rd
Prescott and Russell	Wilfred Latreille				835		3rd
Prince Edward—Lennox	James Flint				1,363		3rd
Quinte	Ian Reilly	ONDP candidate for Hastings West in the 1963 provincial election			3,117		3rd
Renfrew North	Ian Douglas				850		3rd
Renfrew South	Jacqueline Brown				572		3rd
Stormont	Edgar Denis				2,371		3rd

== Greater Toronto Area ==
Riding	Candidate's Name	Notes	Residence	Occupation	Votes	%	Rank
Armourdale	Harold Koehler				6,602		3rd
Beaches—Woodbine	John Brown				10,522		1st
Bellwoods	Frank Parrill				2,684		3rd
Don Mills	Chris Smith				8,747		2nd
Dovercourt	Otto Bressan				4,594		3rd
Downsview	Murray Chusid				8,855		2nd
Durham	Douglas Moffatt				4,164		3rd
Eglinton	Peter Morgan				4,449		3rd
Etobicoke	Morton Warling				9,138		2nd
Halton East	William Gillies	ONDP candidate for Halton in the 1963 provincial election			6,359		3rd
Halton West	Theodore MacDonald				7,823		2nd
High Park	Morton Shulman			Physician	12,892		1st
Humber	Kealey Cummings				7,889		2nd
Lakeshore	Patrick Lawlor		Toronto	Lawyer	10,029		1st
Ontario	Allan McPhail				2,528		3rd
Ontario South	Thomas Edwards	ONDP candidate for Ontario in the 1963 provincial election			7,894		2nd
Oshawa	Clifford Pilkey	Member of Oshawa City Council (1963–1966)	Oshawa	Union leader (United Auto Workers)	13,182		1st
Parkdale	Jan Dukszta			Psychiatrist	4,778		2nd
Peel North	George Hill				7,415		2nd
Peel South	Charles Jenkins				8,616		3rd
Riverdale	Jim Renwick	Member of Provincial Parliament for Riverdale (1964–1984); President of the New Democratic Party (1967–1969)		Lawyer	10,716		1st
Scarborough Centre	Margaret Renwick				12,892		1st
Scarborough East	Jack Ottaway				6,260		3rd
Scarborough North	John Brewin				10,202		2nd
Scarborough West	Stephen Lewis	Member of Provincial Parliament for Scarborough West (1963–1978)			13,225		1st
St. Andrew—St. Patrick	Adam Fuerstenberg				3,707		3rd
St. David	Giles Endicott	ONDP candidate for St. David in the 1963 provincial election			6,354		3rd
St. George	Harry Pope	ONDP candidate for Ottawa East in the 1963 provincial election			5,046		3rd
York East	Fiona Nelson				7,402		3rd
York–Forest Hill	Leon Kumove				8,443		2nd
York Mills	Audrie Tucker				6,418		3rd
York South	Donald C. MacDonald	Leader of the Ontario New Democratic Party (1953–1970); Member of Provincial Parliament for York South (1955–1982)	Toronto	Journalist/teacher	13,073		1st
York West	Jacqueline Shepherd				3,885		3rd
Yorkview	Fred Young	Member of Provincial Parliament for Yorkview (1963–1981)		United Church minister	13,437		1st

== Hamilton, Ontario/Niagara ==
Riding	Candidate's Name	Notes	Residence	Occupation	Votes	%	Rank
Hamilton Centre	Norman Davison	Member of Provincial Parliament for Hamilton Centre (1967–1975); Member of Provincial Parliament for Hamilton East (1959–1967)	Hamilton		8,922		1st
Hamilton East	Reg Gisborn	Member of Provincial Parliament for Hamilton East (1967–1975); Member of Provincial Parliament for Wentworth East (1955–1967)		Metalworker	11,843		1st
Hamilton Mountain	John Dowling				11,022		2nd
Hamilton West	Joseph Bothen				7,005		3rd
Lincoln	Delby Bucknall				4,424		3rd
Niagara Falls	Roy Wiley				3,291		3rd
St. Catharines	William Cousintine				6,134		3rd
Welland	Mel Swart				9,710		2nd
Welland South	Robert Stanford				4,497		3rd
Wentworth	Ian Deans			Firefighter	9,183		1st
Wentworth North	Gordon Vichert				6,342		2nd

== Northern Ontario ==
Riding	Candidate's Name	Notes	Residence	Occupation	Votes	%	Rank
Algoma	Agnes Turcott				2,805		3rd
Algoma—Manitoulin	Leonard Lefebvre				2,358		3rd
Cochrane North	Gerald Jannetteau				3,538		2nd
Cochrane South	Bill Ferrier			United Church minister	8,377		1st
Fort William	Ted Freeman	Member of Provincial Parliament for Fort William (1963–1967)		Salesman	7,282		2nd
Kenora	Robert Clark				4,086		2nd
Muskoka	Earl Heiber				1,959		3rd
Nickel Belt	Donald Scott				4,976		2nd
Nipissing	Jack Wynter				4,698		3rd
Parry Sound	Raymond Emery				3,417		3rd
Port Arthur	May Seaman				5,866		3rd
Rainy River	George Lockhart				2,908		3rd
Sault Ste. Marie	Earl Orchard				9,797		2nd
Sudbury	Arthur Kube				7,266		2nd
Sudbury East	Elie Martel		Sudbury	Teacher	7,454		1st
Thunder Bay	Jack Stokes			Rail conductor	4,064		1st
Timiskaming	Donald Jackson				7,328		1st

== Southwestern Ontario ==
Riding	Candidate's Name	Notes	Residence	Occupation	Votes	%	Rank
Brant	Suzanne Blackburn				1,702		3rd
Brantford	Mac Makarchuk			Journalist	10,465		1st
Chatham—Kent	J. Seagrave				2,044		3rd
Essex—Kent	Victor McMurren				1,609		2nd
Essex South	Pierre Blais				1,605		2nd
Grey–Bruce	Lorne Creighton				3,869		3rd
Grey	Walter Aitken				1,126		3rd
Haldimand—Norfolk	Harry Yaychuk				2,603		3rd
Huron	John Boyne				1,343		3rd
Huron—Bruce	Jack Pym				908		3rd
Kent	Ray McGaffey				606		3rd
Kitchener	Marley Rosenburg	ONDP candidate for Waterloo North in the 1963 provincial election			10,298		2nd
Lambton	Arnold Bock				1,035		3rd
London North	Robert Abrahams				4,559		3rd
London South	William Harrington				4,836		3rd
Middlesex North	Peter Weber				1,819		3rd
Middlesex South	Kenneth Bolton				4,654		3rd
Oxford	Stanley Down				4,507		3rd
Perth	V.I. McIntosh				3,191		3rd
Sandwich—Riverside	Fred Burr	ONDP candidate for Essex North in the 1963 provincial election			8,312		1st
Sarnia	John Hall				3,611		3rd
Waterloo North	Theodore Isley				6,890		3rd
Waterloo South	Robert Kerr				9,323		2nd
Wellington—Dufferin	Alan Rimmer	ONDP candidate for York East in the 1963 provincial election			1,306		3rd
Wellington South	Eugene Benson				6,082		3rd
Windsor—Walkerville	Peter MacKenzie				8,202		2nd
Windsor West	Hugh Peacock	NDP candidate for Essex West in the 1965 federal election.		Union official (UAW)	8,618		1st
