= Ontario New Democratic Party candidates in the 1971 Ontario provincial election =

This is a list of candidates for the Ontario New Democratic Party in the 1971 Ontario general election.

== Central Ontario ==
Riding	Candidate's Name	Notes	Residence	Occupation	Votes	%	Rank
Dufferin–Simcoe	Derek Morley				3,450		3rd
Hastings	Richard Lunn				1,626		3rd
Northumberland	Arthur Cockerill				3,563		3rd
Peterborough	Walter Pitman	Member of Provincial Parliament for Peterborough (1967–1971); Member of Parliament for Peterborough (1960–1962)		Teacher	18,042		2nd
Simcoe Centre	Bruce Bonnell				5,543		3rd
Simcoe East	Roger Pretty				6,641		2nd
Victoria—Haliburton	Arthur Field				2,595		3rd

== Eastern Ontario/Ottawa ==
Riding	Candidate's Name	Notes	Residence	Occupation	Votes	%	Rank
Carleton	Garth Stevenson				7,656		3rd
Carleton East	Jean Usher				6,069		3rd
Glengarry	Ernest Lalonde				1,672		3rd
Grenville–Dundas	Frank Stocker				1,927		3rd
Frontenac—Addington	James Maloney				2,081		4th
Kingston and the Islands	Mary Lloyd-Jones				3,587		3rd
Lanark	James Ronson				2,450		3rd
Leeds	John Fielding				4,723		2nd
Ottawa Centre	Michael Cassidy	Member of Ottawa City Council (1970–1972)	Ottawa	Journalist	8,075		1st
Ottawa East	Denis Deneau				3,590		3rd
Ottawa South	Donald Francis				10,638		2nd
Ottawa West	Ralph Sutherland				11,637		2nd
Prescott and Russell	Yvon Montpetit				4,723		3rd
Prince Edward—Lennox	Bryan Beazer				2,350		3rd
Quinte	Alan Deacon				3,588		3rd
Renfrew North	Frank Berry				2,516		3rd
Renfrew South	Jack McCullough				2,008		3rd
Stormont	George Samis				6,279		2nd

== Greater Toronto Area ==
Riding	Candidate's Name	Notes	Residence	Occupation	Votes	%	Rank
Armourdale	Harold Koehler				7,519		3rd
Beaches—Woodbine	Bruce Kidd				11,138		2nd
Bellwoods	Helen Roedde				3,604		2nd
Don Mills	James Norton				10,116		2nd
Dovercourt	Steve Penner				6,144		2nd
Downsview	Murray Chusid				10,921		2nd
Durham	Douglas Moffatt				7,174		2nd
Eglinton	Robert Imlay				4,819		3rd
Etobicoke	Clayton Peterson				9,072		3rd
Halton East	Kenneth Gelok				7,154		3rd
Halton West	Walter Mulkewich				8,306		3rd
High Park	Morton Shulman	Member of Provincial Parliament for High Park (1967–1975)		Physician	16,509		1st
Humber	Kealey Cummings				8,180		2nd
Lakeshore	Patrick Lawlor	Member of Provincial Parliament for Lakeshore (1967–1981)	Toronto	Lawyer	10,867		1st
Ontario	Harold King				4,356		3rd
Ontario South	Robert Wing				10,947		2nd
Oshawa	Clifford Pilkey				16,481		2nd
Parkdale	Jan Dukszta			Psychiatrist	5,994		1st
Peel North	Harry Davis				11,259		2nd
Peel South	Edward Humphreys				12,266		3rd
Riverdale	Jim Renwick	Member of Provincial Parliament for Riverdale (1964–1984); President of the New Democratic Party (1967–1969)		Lawyer	11,132		1st
Scarborough Centre	Margaret Renwick				10,908		2nd
Scarborough East	Sean Regan				6,514		3rd
Scarborough North	John Brewin				12,959		2nd
Scarborough West	Stephen Lewis	Leader of the Ontario New Democratic Party (1970–1978); Member of Provincial Parliament for Scarborough West (1963–1978)			13,092		1st
St. Andrew—St. Patrick	Daniel Heap				8,451		2nd
St. David	Giles Endicott				8,029		2nd
St. George	David Middleton				5,801		3rd
York East	Bernard Eastman				7,402		3rd
York–Forest Hill	Fiona Nelson				6,963		3rd
York Mills	Michael Morrone				10,159		3rd
York South	Donald C. MacDonald	Member of Provincial Parliament for York South (1955–1982); President of the New Democratic Party (1971–1975); Leader of the Ontario New Democratic Party (1953–1970)	Toronto	Journalist/teacher	12,915		1st
York West	Ted Culp				5,335		3rd
Yorkview	Fred Young			United Church minister	20,660		1st

== Hamilton, Ontario/Niagara ==
Riding	Candidate's Name	Notes	Residence	Occupation	Votes	%	Rank
Hamilton Centre	Norman Davison		Hamilton		8,018		1st
Hamilton East	Reg Gisborn				11,073		1st
Hamilton Mountain	Donald Eastman				10,725		2nd
Hamilton West	William Freeman				8,242		2nd
Lincoln	Arthur Peltomaa				4,556		3rd
Niagara Falls	Shirley Carr				6,319		3rd
Welland	Mel Swart				9,887		2nd
St. Catharines	Marvin Blauer				10,447		2nd
Welland South	Maurice Keck				7,082		3rd
Wentworth	Ian Deans	Member of Provincial Parliament for Wentworth (1967–1979)		Firefighter	14,128		1st
Wentworth North	Gordon Vichert				6,842		3rd

== Northern Ontario ==
Riding	Candidate's Name	Notes	Residence	Occupation	Votes	%	Rank
Algoma	Paul St. Jacques				3,825		2nd
Algoma—Manitoulin	Roger Taylor				3,849		2nd
Cochrane North	René Brixhe				5,758		2nd
Cochrane South	Bill Ferrier	Member of Provincial Parliament for Cochrane South (1967–1977)		United Church minister	11,383		1st
Fort William	David Hughes				9,651		2nd
Kenora	Ernest Brose				4,895		2nd
Muskoka	Ken Cargill				4,121		2nd
Nickel Belt	Floyd Laughren		Sudbury	Economist/Professor at Cambrian College	9,003		1st
Nipissing	Jack Wynter				4,698		3rd
Parry Sound	Larry Labine				2,947		3rd
Port Arthur	Jim Foulds		Port Arthur	Teacher	11,461		1st
Rainy River	Harvey Moats				3,909		2nd
Sault Ste. Marie	Anne Valentine				13,948		2nd
Sudbury	Bud Germa	Member of Parliament for Sudbury (1967–1968)			11,905		1st
Sudbury East	Elie Martel	Member of Provincial Parliament for Sudbury East (1967–1987)	Sudbury	Teacher	15,522		1st
Thunder Bay	Jack Stokes				6,996		1st
Timiskaming	Donald Jackson				7,541		2nd

== Southwestern Ontario ==
Riding	Candidate's Name	Notes	Residence	Occupation	Votes	%	Rank
Brant	David Neumann				3,359		3rd
Brantford	Mac Makarchuk	Member of Provincial Parliament for Brantford (1967–1971)	Brantford	Journalist	12,108		2nd
Chatham—Kent	Leroy Wright				2,859		3rd
Essex—Kent	Joseph Young				6,052		2nd
Essex South	Ralph Wensley				6,521		2nd
Grey–Bruce	Lorne Creighton				4,905		3rd
Grey	James Stevenson				3,029		3rd
Haldimand—Norfolk	Thomas Tobey				4,673		3rd
Huron	Paul Carroll				3,414		3rd
Huron—Bruce	Donald Milne				2,172		3rd
Kent—Elgin	Ray McGaffey				2,051		3rd
Kitchener	George Mitchell				12,237		3rd
Lambton	Harry Wellington				2,915		3rd
London North	Charles Bigelow				11,840		2nd
London South	William Murdock				10,845		3rd
Middlesex North	Pat Chefurka				4,478		3rd
Middlesex South	Kenneth Bolton				9,200		2nd
Oxford	George Knezic				5,856		3rd
Perth	V.I. McIntosh				4,231		3rd
Sandwich—Riverside	Fred Burr				17,944		1st
Sarnia	David Bell				5,544		3rd
Waterloo North	Joachim Surich				10,162		3rd
Waterloo South	Marc Somerville				10,622		2nd
Wellington—Dufferin	Alan Rimmer				2,559		3rd
Wellington South	Carl Hamilton				9,161		3rd
Windsor—Walkerville	Neil Libby				12,010		2nd
Windsor West	Ted Bounsall				13,119		1st
