= Ontario New Democratic Party candidates in the 1963 Ontario provincial election =

This is a list of candidates for the Ontario New Democratic Party in the 1963 Ontario general election. The ONDP ran 97 candidates in the province's 108 ridings; 7 of whom were elected.

== Central Ontario ==
Riding	Candidate's Name	Notes	Residence	Occupation	Votes	%	Rank
Dufferin–Simcoe	Angus Blair				898	6.71	3rd
Hastings East	Charles Clemens				419	3.45	3rd
Hastings West	Ian Reilly				704	3.40	3rd
Northumberland	None				–	–	–
Peterborough	Mildred Sutton				4,490	15.36	3rd
Simcoe Centre	Derrick Manson	CCF candidate for Simcoe Centre in the 1959 provincial election			1,271	7.36	3rd
Simcoe East	Cecil Hobson				935	5.59	3rd
Victoria	Ross Gruer				771	4.83	3rd

== Eastern Ontario/Ottawa ==
Riding	Candidate's Name	Notes	Residence	Occupation	Votes	%	Rank
Carleton	Christopher Orton				1,251		3rd
Frontenac—Addington	James Maloney				769		3rd
Glengarry	Elizabeth Latreille				172		3rd
Grenville–Dundas	None				–	–	–
Kingston	Lavada Pinder				1,389		3rd
Lanark	James Griffith				879		3rd
Leeds	William Thompson				654		3rd
Ottawa East	Harry Pope				857		3rd
Ottawa South	Peter Hopwood				1,241		3rd
Ottawa West	Stewart Crawford				768		3rd
Prescott	None				–	–	–
Prince Edward—Lennox	Roderick MacDonald				931		3rd
Renfrew North	Marc Llanos				861		3rd
Renfrew South	John Johnston				358		3rd
Russell	Peter D'Aoust				1,632		4th
Stormont	William Kilger				675		3rd

== Greater Toronto Area ==
Riding	Candidate's Name	Notes	Residence	Occupation	Votes	%	Rank
Armourdale	Vincent Kelly				4,140		3rd
Beaches	Stanley Bullock				6,457		2nd
Bellwoods	Herbert Hyman				1,793		3rd
Bracondale	Stanley Matias				2,675		3rd
Don Mills	Jim Renwick		Toronto	Lawyer	5,252		2nd
Dovercourt	Jack White				3,418		3rd
Downsview	Alan Borovoy				6,807		2nd
Durham	Harold Ashton				1,135		3rd
Eglinton	Thomas Stevens				2,916		3rd
Etobicoke	James Goodison				3,232		2nd
Forest Hill	J. Midanick				7,748		2nd
Halton	William Gillies				5,188		3rd
High Park	Andrew Mays				3,420		3rd
Humber	John Whitehouse				5,170		3rd
Lakeshore	Murray Cotterill				5,024		3rd
Ontario	Thomas Edwards	CCF candidate for Ontario in the 1959 provincial election			2,224		3rd
Oshawa	Tommy Thomas	Member of Provincial Parliament for Oshawa (1955–1963); Member of Provincial Parliament for Ontario (1948–1955)	Oshawa	Toolmaker	11,395		2nd
Parkdale	Archibald Chisholm				4,304		3rd
Peel	Emmett Roach				5,177		3rd
Riverdale	Gerald Gallagher				3,676		3rd
Scarborough Centre	Kenneth Ranney				6,860		2nd
Scarborough East	Harry Schofield				3,137		3rd
Scarborough North	Angus Smith				4,785		3rd
Scarborough West	Stephen Lewis		Toronto		10,641		1st
St. Andrew	Ellen Adams				1,640		3rd
St. David	Giles Endicott				2,139		3rd
St. George	Kenneth Hamilton				1,941		3rd
St. Patrick	Gerald Soloway				1,025		3rd
Woodbine	Ken Bryden	Member of Provincial Parliament for Woodbine (1959–1967)		Economist	9,020		1st
York East	Alan Rimmer				4,765		3rd
York Mills	Douglas Peterson				8,040		2nd
York South	Donald C. MacDonald	Leader of the Ontario New Democratic Party (1953–1970); Member of Provincial Parliament for York South (1955–1982)	Toronto	Journalist/teacher	10,538		1st
York West	Henry Brennan				2,064		3rd
Yorkview	Fred Young			United Church minister	7,607		1st

== Hamilton/Niagara ==
Riding	Candidate's Name	Notes	Residence	Occupation	Votes	%	Rank
Hamilton Centre	William Scandlan	CCF candidate for Hamilton Centre in the 1959 provincial election			6,955		2nd
Hamilton East	Norman Davison	Member of Provincial Parliament for Hamilton East (1959–1967)	Hamilton	Machinist	8,097		1st
Hamilton—Wentworth	Harold van Oene				3,511		3rd
Lincoln	Frank Dyck				4,235		3rd
Niagara Falls	Karl Clemens				2,568		3rd
Welland	Alice Katool				2,108		3rd
Wentworth					8,909		
Wentworth East	Reg Gisborn	Member of Provincial Parliament for Wentworth East (1955–1967)		Union leader (United Steelworkers)/steelworker	8,634		1st

== Northern Ontario ==
Riding	Candidate's Name	Notes	Residence	Occupation	Votes	%	Rank
Algoma—Manitoulin	Arley Spencer				1,557		3rd
Cochrane North	S. Lefebvre				1,975		3rd
Cochrane South	Joseph Zbitnew				8,109		2nd
Fort William	Ted Freeman			Salesman	8,427		1st
Kenora	Emile Blouin				2,187		3rd
Muskoka	Hugh Bishop				1,015		3rd
Nickel Belt	Edward Levert	CCF candidate for Nickel Belt in the 1959 provincial election			6,898		3rd
Nipissing	Benjamin Levert				2,119		3rd
Parry Sound	Dorothy Sleeth				787		3rd
Port Arthur	Joseph Shannon				6,731		2nd
Rainy River	Owen Lindsay	CCF candidate for Rainy River in the 1959 provincial election			1,269		3rd
Sault Ste. Marie	Lloyd Hetherington				6,446		3rd
Sudbury	Bud Germa			Union organizer	5,022		3rd
Timiskaming	Jack Laforge				2,227		3rd

== Southwestern Ontario ==
Riding	Candidate's Name	Notes	Residence	Occupation	Votes	%	Rank
Brant	Harry Sanders				1,725		3rd
Brantford	William Humble				2,136		3rd
Bruce	None				–	–	–
Elgin	None				–	–	–
Essex North	Fred Burr			Teacher	6,505		3rd
Essex South	Donald Bertrand				773		3rd
Grey North	Percy England				1,642		3rd
Grey South	None				–	–	–
Haldimand—Norfolk	Myron Stachnyk				640		3rd
Huron	None				–	–	–
Huron—Bruce	None				–	–	–
Kent East	None				–	–	–
Kent West	None				–	–	–
Lambton East	Donald Whiting				252		3rd
Lambton West	Alexander Grabove				3,207		3rd
London North	Clayton Fee				1,480		3rd
London South	Robert Foxcroft				2,364		3rd
Middlesex North	Harold Johnson				726		3rd
Middlesex South	Pat Chefurka				1,483		3rd
Oxford	Donald Morton				1,161		3rd
Perth	None				–	–	–
Waterloo North	Morley Rosenberg				4,951		3rd
Waterloo South	Max Saltsman				6,610		3rd
Wellington—Dufferin	Donald Fletcher				671		3rd
Wellington South	Charles Leaman				3,351		3rd
Windsor—Sandwich	Albert Weeks	CCF candidate for Windsor—Sandwich in the 1959 provincial election			5,035		3rd
Windsor—Walkerville	Robert McLean				2,473		3rd
