= George Grant Halcrow =

Canadian politician from Ontario

Member of the Ontario Provincial Parliament for Hamilton East
- In office October 20, 1919 – May 10, 1923
- Preceded by: Allan Studholme
- Succeeded by: Leeming Carr

Personal details
- Party: Labour

George Grant Halcrow was a Canadian politician from the Labour Party. He represented Hamilton East in the Legislative Assembly of Ontario from 1919 to 1923.

== See also ==
- 15th Parliament of Ontario
- List of United Farmers/Labour MLAs in the Ontario legislature
