= Leeming Carr =

Canadian politician

Dr. Leeming George Carr

MPP for Hamilton East
- In office June 25, 1923 – May 15, 1928
- Preceded by: George Grant Halcrow
- Succeeded by: William Robert Morrison

Personal details
- Born: December 21, 1864 Glanford, Canada West
- Died: June 6, 1934 (aged 69)
- Party: Conservative
- Occupation: Physician

Leeming Carr (December 21, 1864 – June 6, 1934) was a physician and political figure in Ontario. He represented Hamilton East in the Legislative Assembly of Ontario from 1923 to 1928 as a Conservative member.

He was born in Glanford township on December 12, 1862 to John Champion Carr and Sarah Susan Ryckman, and was educated in Hamilton and at the University of Toronto, the University of Glasgow and the University of Edinburgh. Carr served as a member of the Wentworth County Council from 1898 to 1900 and later was a member of the Hamilton Board of Education. He was a minister without portfolio in the provincial cabinet from 1923 to 1928. Carr resigned his seat in the assembly in 1928 after he was named sheriff for Wentworth County.

On June 17, 1890 he married Katharine Anderson, who later became a published author.

His son Leeming Anderson Carr Jr was also a doctor and played with the Hamilton Alerts and won the 1912 Grey Cup. His grandson was John Munro, a federal cabinet minister and MP.
