= Robert Ellsworth Elliott =

Canadian politician

Ontario MPP
- In office November 22, 1951 – June 10, 1959
- Preceded by: John Lawrence Dowling
- Succeeded by: Norman Davison
- Constituency: Hamilton East
- In office 1945–1948
- Preceded by: William Herbert Connor
- Succeeded by: John Lawrence Dowling
- Constituency: Hamilton East

Personal details
- Born: January 19, 1901 Allenwood, Ontario, Canada
- Died: April 17, 1981 (aged 80) Clearwater, Florida, U.S.
- Party: Progressive Conservative
- Spouse: Edith May Homan
- Children: 2
- Occupation: General contractor

Military service
- Allegiance: Canadian
- Branch/service: Royal Canadian Engineers
- Years of service: 1918-1928

Robert Ellsworth Elliott (January 19, 1901 – April 17, 1981) was a politician in Ontario, Canada. He was a Progressive Conservative member of the Legislative Assembly of Ontario from 1945 to 1948 and from 1951 to 1959. He represented the riding of Hamilton East.

== Background ==
He was born in Allenwood, Ontario and was a general contractor. He married Edith May Homan in 1926 with whom he had two children. He served with the Royal Canadian Engineers for ten years. Elliott moved to Florida in 1968 and died there on April 17, 1981.

== Politics ==
From 1934 to 1945 he served as an alderman on the Hamilton, Ontario City Council. In the 1945 provincial election, he ran as the Progressive Conservative candidate in the riding of Hamilton East. He defeated CCF incumbent Herbert Connor by 2,945 votes.

In the 1948 election he lost to CCF candidate John Dowling but recaptured the riding from Dowling in 1951. He lost the riding in 1959 to CCF candidate Norm Davison by 1,072 votes.
