= Dominic Agostino =

Canadian politician

Ontario MPP
- In office June 8, 1995 – March 24, 2004
- Preceded by: Bob Mackenzie
- Succeeded by: Andrea Horwath
- Constituency: Hamilton East

Personal details
- Born: October 14, 1959 Sicily, Italy
- Died: March 24, 2004 (aged 44) Hamilton, Ontario
- Party: Liberal
- Profession: Rehabilitation counsellor

Dominic Agostino (October 14, 1959 – March 24, 2004) was a Canadian politician who represented the riding of Hamilton East for the Liberal Party in the Legislative Assembly of Ontario from 1995 until his death in 2004.

== Background ==
Born in Sicily, Italy, Agostino was raised in Hamilton, Ontario and attended Mohawk College in that city. He worked as rehabilitation counsellor with the Ontario March of Dimes, and was a special assistant to Ontario Minister of Culture Lily Munro from 1985 to 1987.

== Politics ==
Agostino was elected as a Catholic separate school board trustee in the Hamilton-Wentworth board at the age of 21, serving from 1980 to 1987. He campaigned in the 1985 provincial election in Hamilton Mountain, and finished third against New Democrat Brian Charlton. He then served as an alderman on the Hamilton City Council from 1987 until the provincial election of 1995.

He was elected as the Member of Provincial Parliament for Hamilton East. He was the first Liberal candidate to win the riding since 1937, and the first member of Hamilton's Italian community to win a provincial election anywhere in the city. He defeated Andrew MacKenzie, the son of outgoing New Democratic Party Labour Minister Bob Mackenzie, by about 4,000 votes.

The 1995 election was won by the Progressive Conservative Party, and Agostino quickly emerged as a prominent figure in the parliamentary opposition. He became a leading spokesperson for the Liberal Party's left wing, and gained particular praise for his performance as the party's Environment Critic from 1996 to 1999.

In 1996, Agostino supported Gerard Kennedy's unsuccessful bid for the party leadership. He was re-elected without difficulty in the provincial election of 1999, and served as Chief Opposition Whip from 1999 to 2002. Unlike some others in his party, he supported the City of Hamilton's amalgamation in 2000.

The Liberals won a majority government in the provincial election of 2003, although Agostino was re-elected with a somewhat reduced margin of victory. To the surprise of many in the province, he was not appointed to the first cabinet of Dalton McGuinty in October 2003. This was widely interpreted as a snub, but subsequent events cast the decision in a much different light: Agostino died on March 24, 2004, of liver cancer. He had been battling the disease for some time and had undergone surgery during the 2003 campaign, although this information was not made public until his death.

In a by-election to fill his legislative seat held on May 13, 2004, his brother Ralph, a Catholic separate school board trustee, failed to retain the Hamilton East seat for the Liberal Party, falling far behind city councillor and NDP candidate Andrea Horwath.

== Sexuality ==
Shortly after his death, the Toronto-based LGBT community magazine fab published a piece titled "Why Did He Die a Straight Man?", in which the author, Eleanor Brown, alleged that Agostino was in the closet about his sexuality; she highlighted Agostino's support for legislation granting spousal benefits to same-sex partners, attendance at Gay Day at Canada's Wonderland in 1997, and regular patronage of clubs in Toronto's Church and Wellesley area. Neither Agostino nor his friends made any public statement on the matter. Agostino was quoted as saying: "As long as you are consistent, your private life should remain private."

Initial media reports on his death stated erroneously that he was married, naming Agostino's sister-in-law Rose as his wife. This was quickly retracted by the media, and attributed to a journalist's misinterpretation of the government press release announcing Agostino's death ("Our thoughts and love are with Dominic's mother Theresa, his brother Ralph and his wife Rose, Dominic's sister Mary and her husband Tony, and Dominic's beloved nieces and nephews.") His partner was not acknowledged in his death notice or at his funeral mass held at the Hamilton Cathedral. However, at a memorial services held in downtown Toronto, Premier Dalton McGuinty specifically named his partner in conveying condolence.
