= Henry Carscallen =

Canadian politician

Henry Carscallen K.C.

MPP for Hamilton East
- In office 1898–1906
- Preceded by: James Taylor Middleton
- Succeeded by: Allan Studholme

Personal details
- Born: 14 August 1845 Saltfleet Township, Wentworth County, Canada West
- Died: 16 September 1906 (aged 61)
- Party: Conservative
- Spouse(s): Emily Gurney (died); J. Rodgers
- Children: 6
- Occupation: Municipal and provincial politician
- Profession: Lawyer

Henry "Cass" Carscallen (14 August 1845 – 16 September 1906) was an Ontario barrister and political figure. He represented Hamilton East in the Legislative Assembly of Ontario as a Conservative member from 1898 to 1906.

== Early life ==
Carscallen was born in Saltfleet Township, Wentworth County, Canada West, the son of John Thomas Carscallen and Elizabeth Jones. The Carscallen family were United Empire Loyalists who settled in Napanee, Ontario shortly after the American Revolution.

Carscallen attended school in Bartonville and then at the Central School in downtown Hamilton. Though he passed the barrister exams at age 23, he did not start practicing law until 1875, entering the firm of Marin & Ferguson where he had previously articled. After Ferguson's retirement from the law, Carscallen was made a full partner, though he left shortly after to open a new law firm with Edwin Cahill. It was during this time that he earned the nickname "Cass", which followed him through his professional and political career.

Known as a skilled orator, Carscallen's firm became sought after by high-profile clients, including during the city's sensational Hyslop and Depew murder cases.

== Politics ==
Though Carscallen's family were all ardent Conservatives, he began his political career as a supporter of Reform causes, particularly focusing on economic protectionism. He later changed his political affiliation to Conservative after the Reformist movement failed to pursue the kind of protectionism he advocated.

Carscallen's political career began in 1877 with his election to the office of Ward 6 alderman on Hamilton City Council. After three terms, Carscallen made the first of three unsuccessful attempts to become the Mayor of Hamilton in 1880, but lost to James Edwin O'Reilly.

Carscallen reclaimed his City Council seat in 1884 and won re-election in 1885 before running again for mayor in 1886. In this attempt, he fell short to the eventual winner, Alexander McKay, by only 508 votes. Carscallen returned to council again in 1890 and served until 1894, at which point he launched his third and final unsuccessful bid to become mayor. During this campaign, Carscallen's bid was considered a long-shot, as he ran against the popular independent politician and former Hamilton Police Chief Alexander David Stewart, who the Hamilton Spectator noted was "at the zenith of his popularity." During this campaign, he branded himself "The People's Candidate" and listed the support of former mayor William Doran.

After his final run for mayor ended in defeat, he returned to council in 1897 and 1898, during which he was the chair of the city's finance committee. During his final year on council, he was nominated to be the Conservative candidate for provincial parliament in the electoral district of Hamilton East. He was successful in this bid for office in 1898 and quickly became known for his powerful debate and oratory skills.

Re-elected easily in 1902 and 1905, Carscallen was never appointed to the cabinet, but was given the chair of the legislature's private bills committee by James Whitney after the Conservatives formed government.

== Illness and death ==
During the second year of the 11th Parliament of Ontario, Carscallen became fatigued with the rigours of the job and his busy schedule. In the summer of 1906, in an effort to rest and address his recent diagnosis with Bright's disease, Carscallen left Hamilton for Atlantic City, though returned quickly after his illness progressed rapidly. In early September, his condition improved slightly, leading his doctors to issue statements indicating he could possibly recover and return to work within weeks. Shortly after, his condition deteriorated and Carscallen died at his home at 99 Duke Street in downtown Hamilton.

Following his death, the Spectator called Carscallen one of Hamilton's "most popular and distinguished citizens" who gave Ontario's provincial government "his great experience and unusual gifts."

The by-election to replace him was won by Labour candidate Allan Studholme, who defeated the Conservative candidate, J.J. Scott, by over 800 votes, with the former even carrying Carscallen's former seat, Ward 6.

== Notes ==
- Canadian Parliamentary Guide, 1901, AJ Magurn
