= Allan Studholme =

Canadian politician

Ontario MPP
- In office 1906–1919
- Preceded by: Henry Carscallen
- Succeeded by: George Grant Halcrow
- Constituency: Hamilton East

Personal details
- Born: December 8, 1846 Birmingham, England
- Died: July 28, 1919 (aged 72) Toronto, Ontario, Canada
- Resting place: Hamilton Cemetery
- Party: Labour
- Spouse: Priscilla Stearn
- Children: 4
- Occupation: Stove mounter

Allan Studholme (8 December 1846 – 28 July 1919) was a Canadian trade unionist and Ontario politician. He served as Labour MLA from 1906 to 1919.

Born in England near Birmingham, Studholme worked from his childhood. He moved to Canada in 1878 living in Dundas and Guelph before settling in Hamilton in 1885 where he found work as a stove mounter. An active trade unionist from his days in Britain, Studholme became active in the Knights of Labour and believed that workers should be active in politics on a class basis.

After a short time in Australia and New Zealand he returned to Hamilton in 1901. As a result of his involvement in support of striking streetcar workers, he was elected to the Ontario legislature from Hamilton East in a 1906 by-election as an Independent Labour MLA, becoming the first Labour member of the Ontario legislature. He remained at Queen's Park until his death in 1919.

In the legislature, Studholme championed pro-worker legislation such as the eight-hour day, a minimum wage and helped bring the Workmen's Compensation Act into existence. He also supported progressive causes such as women's suffrage.
