= John P. MacKay =

Canadian politician from Ontario

Member of the Ontario Provincial Parliament for Hamilton East
- In office October 6, 1937 – June 30, 1943
- Preceded by: Samuel Lawrence
- Succeeded by: William Herbert Connor

Personal details
- Party: Liberal

John P. MacKay was a Canadian politician who was Liberal MPP for Hamilton East from 1937 to 1943.

== See also ==
- 20th Parliament of Ontario
