= William Robert Morrison =

Canadian politician (1878–1947)

William Morrison KC

MPP for Hamilton East
- In office July 27, 1928 – April 3, 1934
- Preceded by: Leeming Carr
- Succeeded by: Samuel Lawrence

Mayor of Hamilton
- In office 1935–1943
- Preceded by: Herbert Earl Wilton
- Succeeded by: Samuel Lawrence

Personal details
- Born: April 20, 1878 Hamilton, Ontario, Canada
- Died: March 16, 1947 (aged 68) Hamilton, Ontario, Canada
- Resting place: Woodland Cemetery
- Party: Conservative Party of Ontario
- Spouse: Lucy Musson Weir
- Children: William Robert Morrison

William Morrison, KC, (April 20, 1878 - March 16, 1947) was Mayor of Hamilton, Ontario, Canada, from 1935 to 1943.

First serving as a lawyer and, later, a Crown Prosecutor, Morrison was first elected as an alderman for Ward 2 in 1921. He was re-elected in 1922. Two years later, he secured a seat on the Board of Control. He was elected in a by-election in 1928 as the Conservative Party Member of Provincial Parliament for Hamilton East. He was re-elected in 1929, and served until he was defeated in 1934. During his time with the Conservatives he nominated Colonel George Drew as leader of the party.

He returned to Hamilton and was elected mayor in 1935, a position in which he served until 1943. He was elected (annually) eight times, a record to that date. He served as President of the Ontario Mayors' Association and was a member of the Dominion Mayors' Association. He married Lucy Musson Weir, and had one son, William Robert Morrison, (1912–1983), who became a provincial court judge in Hamilton. His grandson, William R. Morrison, is a Canadian historian.
