= James Taylor Middleton =

Canadian politician

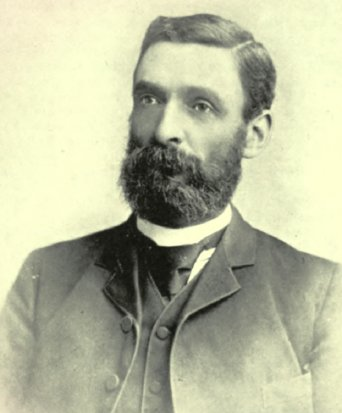

MLA for Hamilton East
- In office 1894–1898
- Preceded by: Riding created
- Succeeded by: Henry Carscallen

Personal details
- Born: November 28, 1840 Alloa, Scotland
- Died: 1926 (aged 85–86)
- Party: Ontario Liberal Party

James Taylor Middleton (November 28, 1840 – 1926) was an Ontario businessman and political figure. He represented Hamilton East in the Legislative Assembly of Ontario from 1894 to 1898 as a Liberal member.

He was born in Alloa, Scotland, the son of Arthur Middleton, and educated in Edinburgh. Middleton came with his family to Canada West in 1851 and studied in St. Catharines and Stamford. His uncle G.W. Taylor was mayor of Clifton (later Niagara Falls) and also served as warden for Welland County. He worked on his uncle's farm, before being employed as a clerk in several stores and then becoming partner in a store in Smithville with one of his former employers. He later became partner and then sole owner of a wholesale business involved in the sale of marble and granite for construction. Middleton served on the council for Grimsby Township and was also active in temperance organizations. In 1865, he married Catherine Olivia Eastman. Middleton was an unsuccessful candidate for a seat in the House of Commons in 1891.
