= 1967 Ontario general election =

Canadian provincial election

- October 17, 1967

117 seats in the 28th Legislative Assembly of Ontario 59 seats were needed for a majority
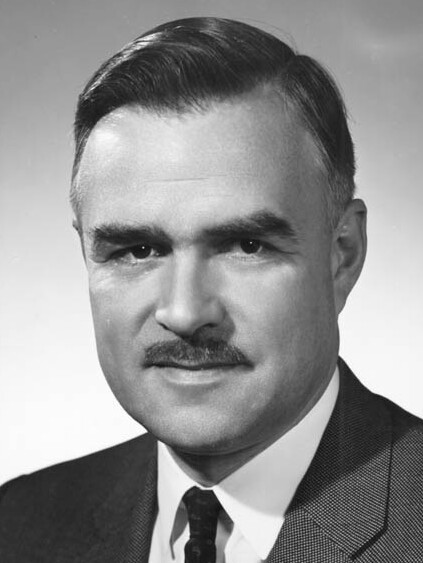

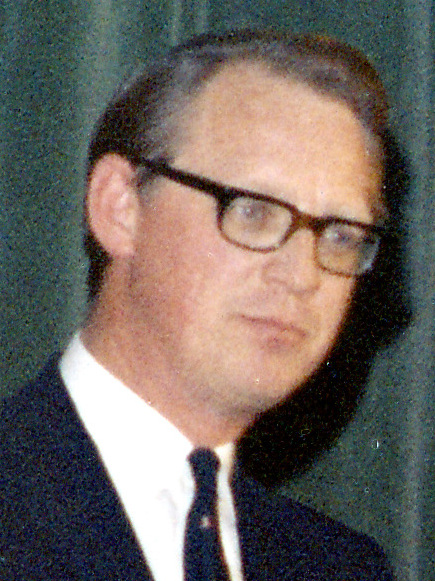

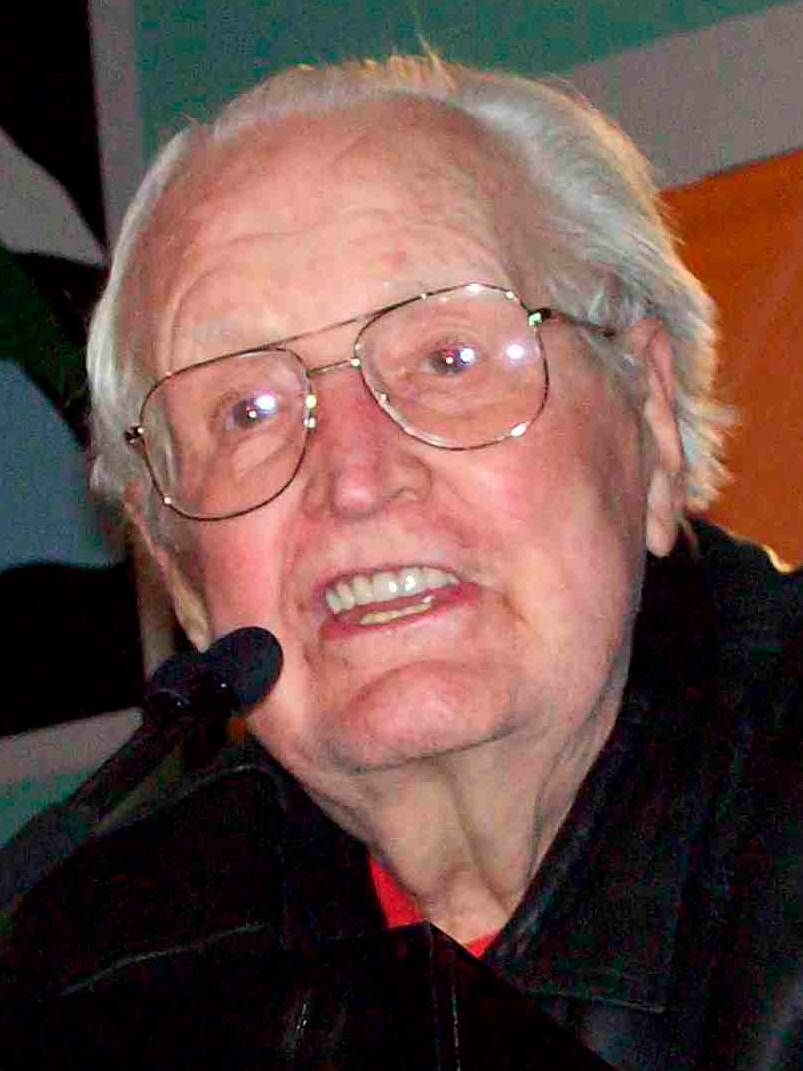
	First party	Second party	Third party
Leader	John Robarts	Robert Nixon	Donald C. MacDonald
Party	Progressive Conservative	Liberal	New Democratic
Leader since	October 25, 1961	January 6, 1967	November 21, 1953
Leader's seat	London North	Brant	York South
Last election	77	24	7
Seats won	69	28	20
Seat change	▼8	▲4	▲13
Percentage	42.3%	31.6%	25.9%
Swing	▼6.6pp	▼3.7pp	▲10.4pp
Premier before election
John Robarts
Progressive Conservative
Premier after election
John Robarts
Progressive Conservative

The 1967 Ontario general election was held on October 17, 1967, to elect the 117 members of the 28th Legislative Assembly of Ontario (Members of Provincial Parliament, or "MPPs") of the Province of Ontario, Canada.

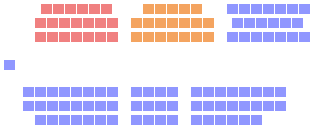
29th Legislature

The Ontario Progressive Conservative Party, led by John Robarts, won an eighth consecutive term in office, and maintained its majority in the legislature despite losing eight seats from its result in the previous election.

The Ontario Liberal Party, led by Robert Nixon, increased its caucus from 24 to 28 members, and continued in the role of official opposition. T. Patrick Reid of Rainy River was elected as a Liberal-Labour MPP. He replaced Robert Gibson, the late MPP for Kenora as the legislature's sole Liberal-Labour MPP.

The social democratic Ontario New Democratic Party, led by Donald C. MacDonald, increased its caucus in the legislature from 7 members to 20.

== Expansion of the Legislative Assembly ==
The size of the Legislative Assembly was increased from 108 to 117 members, mainly through the reorganization of ridings outside Toronto:

Abolished ridings	New ridings
Drawn from parts of other ridings
	Algoma (Note: from part of Algoma—Manitoulin)
	Carleton East (Note: from part of Carleton)
	Kitchener (Note: from part of Waterloo North)
	Ontario South (Note: from part of Ontario)
	Ottawa Centre (Note: from parts of Carleton, Ottawa West and Ottawa East)
	St. Catharines (Note: from part of Lincoln)
	Sudbury East (Note: from part of Sudbury)
	Thunder Bay (Note: from parts of Fort William and Port Arthur)
	Welland South (Note: from part of Welland)
	York Centre (Note: from part of York North)
Abolished ridings
Bracondale	distributed to Dovercourt and Bellwoods
Reorganization of ridings
Essex North; Kent East; Kent West	Chatham—Kent; Essex—Kent; Kent
Hastings East; Hastings West	Hastings; Quinte
Lambton East; Lambton West	Lambton; Sarnia
Wentworth; Wentworth East	Hamilton Mountain; Wentworth; Wentworth North
Merger of ridings
Bruce; Grey North	Grey—Bruce
Prescott; Russell	Prescott and Russell
Beaches; Woodbine	Beaches—Woodbine
St. Andrew; St. Patrick	St. Andrew—St. Patrick
Division of ridings
Halton	Halton East; Halton West
Peel	Peel North; Peel South
Windsor—Sandwich	Sandwich—Riverside; Windsor West
Renaming of ridings
Forest Hill	York-Forest Hill
Kingston	Kingston and the Islands
Hamilton—Wentworth	Hamilton West
Victoria	Victoria—Haliburton

== Results ==
=== Summary ===
Elections to the 28th Parliament of Ontario (1967)
Political party	Party leader	MNAs				Votes			
Political party	Party leader	Candidates	1963	1967	±	#	±	%	± (pp)
Progressive Conservative	John Robarts	117	77	69	8▼	1,018,755	33,985▼	42.10%	6.51▼
Liberal	Robert Nixon	115	23	27	4▲	762,340	8,308▲	31.51%	3.31▼
Liberal–Labour	Robert Nixon	2	1	1	Steady	5,051	1,723▼	0.21%	0.10▼
New Democratic	Donald C. MacDonald	117	7	20	13▲	628,397	288,189▲	25.97%	10.26▲
Independent		5	–	–	–	2,382	377▼	0.10%	0.03▼
Social Credit	Harvey Lainson	7	–	–	–	1,906	407▼	0.08%	0.03▼
Communist	Bruce Magnuson	2	–	–	–	592	1,062▼	0.02%	0.06▼
Socialist Labor		1	–	–	–	287	184▲	0.01%	0.01▲
Total		366	108	117		2,419,710		100.00%	
Rejected ballots						19,528	1.223▼		
Voter turnout						2,439,238	255,160▲	66.18	2.65▲
Registered electors						3,685,755	247,921▲		

=== Vote and seat summaries ===
Ternary plots - shift of electoral support (1963-1967)
1963

1967
Electoral districts identified by colours of winning parties

Seats and popular vote by party
Party	Seats	Votes	Change (pp)
█ Progressive Conservative	69 / 117	42.10%	-6.51
█ Liberal	27 / 117	31.51%	-3.31
█ Liberal–Labour	1 / 117	0.21%	-0.10
█ New Democratic	20 / 117	25.97%	10.26
█ Independent	0 / 122	0.10%	-0.03
█ Other	0 / 122	0.11%	-0.31

=== Synopsis of results ===
Results by riding - 1967 Ontario general election
Riding	Winning party						Turnout (Note: including spoilt ballots)	Votes					
Name (Note: order is as given in EO reports)	1963	Party	Votes	Share	Margin #	Margin %	Turnout	PC	Lib/LL	NDP	Ind	Oth	Total
Algoma	New	PC	3,956	40.25%	888	9.03%	66.73%	3,956	3,068	2,805	–	–	9,829
Algoma—Manitoulin	Lib	Lib	4,424	45.12%	1,402	14.30%	67.62%	3,022	4,424	2,358	–	–	9,804
Brant	Lib	Lib	7,859	57.21%	3,683	26.81%	67.44%	4,176	7,859	1,702	–	–	13,737
Brantford	Lib	NDP	10,465	35.84%	497	1.70%	74.63%	9,968	8,764	10,465	–	–	29,197
Carleton	PC	PC	10,506	50.99%	3,810	18.49%	62.08%	10,506	6,696	3,404	–	–	20,606
Carleton East	New	PC	9,111	60.24%	4,172	27.58%	52.49%	9,111	4,939	1,075	–	–	15,125
Chatham—Kent	New	PC	8,575	48.18%	1,396	7.84%	60.58%	8,575	7,179	2,044	–	–	17,798
Cochrane North	PC	PC	7,536	58.63%	3,998	31.10%	67.18%	7,536	1,780	3,538	–	–	12,854
Cochrane South	PC	NDP	8,377	43.51%	801	4.16%	71.51%	7,576	3,302	8,377	–	–	19,255
Dufferin—Simcoe	PC	PC	7,973	57.88%	4,115	29.88%	52.77%	7,973	3,858	1,943	–	–	13,774
Durham	PC	PC	7,650	45.27%	2,567	15.19%	72.35%	7,650	5,083	4,164	–	–	16,897
Elgin	PC	PC	10,662	44.95%	485	2.04%	68.23%	10,662	10,177	1,535	1,348	–	23,722
Essex—Kent	New	Lib	5,829	47.48%	991	8.07%	66.36%	4,838	5,829	1,609	–	–	12,276
Essex South	Lib	Lib	10,476	59.85%	5,054	28.88%	66.16%	5,422	10,476	1,605	–	–	17,503
Fort William	NDP	PC	7,744	34.32%	208	0.92%	75.76%	7,744	7,536	7,282	–	–	22,562
Frontenac—Addington	PC	PC	6,888	52.79%	3,013	23.09%	61.29%	6,888	3,875	2,285	–	–	13,048
Glengarry	PC	PC	6,214	52.97%	1,441	12.28%	74.31%	6,214	4,773	745	–	–	11,732
Grenville—Dundas	PC	PC	7,905	59.54%	3,009	22.66%	58.52%	7,905	4,896	475	–	–	13,276
Grey—Bruce	New	Lib	10,837	46.62%	2,298	9.89%	75.72%	8,539	10,837	3,869	–	–	23,245
Grey South	Lib	PC	8,872	59.68%	4,116	27.69%	71.02%	8,872	4,756	1,126	111	–	14,865
Haldimand—Norfolk	PC	PC	11,768	53.28%	4,272	19.34%	69.75%	11,768	7,496	2,603	–	221	22,088
Halton East	New	PC	9,867	38.05%	164	0.63%	66.87%	9,867	9,703	6,359	–	–	25,929
Halton West	New	PC	13,709	49.10%	5,886	21.08%	66.79%	13,709	6,389	7,823	–	–	27,921
Hamilton Centre	PC	NDP	8,922	45.47%	2,309	11.77%	61.89%	4,086	6,613	8,922	–	–	19,621
Hamilton East	NDP	NDP	11,843	51.95%	6,084	26.69%	64.82%	5,759	5,193	11,843	–	–	22,795
Hamilton Mountain	New	PC	12,105	44.60%	1,083	3.99%	67.98%	12,105	3,846	11,022	–	166	27,139
Hamilton West	PC	PC	8,625	37.73%	1,398	6.12%	64.61%	8,625	7,227	7,005	–	–	22,857
Hastings	New	PC	8,575	68.64%	6,032	48.29%	67.98%	8,575	2,543	1,374	–	–	12,492
Huron	PC	PC	8,353	62.20%	4,619	34.39%	72.03%	8,353	3,734	1,343	–	–	13,430
Huron—Bruce	Lib	Lib	9,166	57.10%	3,188	19.86%	82.07%	5,978	9,166	908	–	–	16,052
Kenora	LL	PC	8,297	58.00%	4,211	29.44%	64.83%	8,297	1,921	4,086	–	–	14,304
Kent	New	Lib	7,668	51.02%	913	6.07%	76.94%	6,755	7,668	606	–	–	15,029
Kingston and the Islands	PC	PC	10,246	47.12%	2,365	10.88%	66.05%	10,246	7,881	3,617	–	–	21,744
Kitchener	New	Lib	10,350	34.29%	52	0.17%	64.69%	9,096	10,350	10,298	–	441	30,185
Lambton	New	PC	8,481	54.29%	2,374	15.20%	69.62%	8,481	6,107	1,035	–	–	15,623
Lanark	PC	PC	9,505	70.14%	6,379	47.07%	59.88%	9,505	3,126	921	–	–	13,552
Leeds	PC	PC	12,127	68.38%	7,413	41.80%	64.81%	12,127	4,714	895	–	–	17,736
Lincoln	PC	PC	13,334	59.28%	8,597	38.22%	64.89%	13,334	4,737	4,424	–	–	22,495
London North	PC	PC	13,087	49.14%	4,100	15.39%	56.86%	13,087	8,987	4,559	–	–	26,633
London South	PC	PC	15,116	53.85%	6,999	24.93%	64.19%	15,116	8,117	4,836	–	–	28,069
Middlesex North	PC	PC	5,744	52.78%	2,425	22.28%	67.01%	5,744	3,319	1,819	–	–	10,882
Middlesex South	PC	PC	8,423	44.47%	2,558	13.50%	63.19%	8,423	5,865	4,654	–	–	18,942
Muskoka	PC	PC	6,458	61.99%	4,457	42.78%	67.13%	6,458	2,001	1,959	–	–	10,418
Niagara Falls	Lib	Lib	10,451	51.16%	3,763	18.42%	60.29%	6,688	10,451	3,291	–	–	20,430
Nickel Belt	PC	PC	6,210	47.63%	1,234	9.47%	75.43%	6,210	1,851	4,976	–	–	13,037
Nipissing	Lib	Lib	9,471	42.98%	321	1.46%	70.95%	9,150	9,471	3,417	–	–	22,038
Northumberland	PC	PC	10,411	57.62%	3,819	21.14%	73.01%	10,411	6,592	1,066	–	–	18,069
Ontario	PC	PC	7,513	55.15%	3,931	28.86%	65.14%	7,513	3,582	2,528	–	–	13,623
Ontario South	New	PC	9,190	39.57%	1,296	5.58%	71.74%	9,190	5,975	7,894	–	166	23,225
Oshawa	PC	NDP	13,182	43.79%	2,080	6.91%	70.02%	11,102	5,821	13,182	–	–	30,105
Ottawa Centre	New	Lib	7,688	43.07%	715	4.01%	52.83%	6,973	7,688	3,190	–	–	17,851
Ottawa East	Lib	PC	8,155	46.44%	12	0.07%	50.70%	8,155	8,143	1,263	–	–	17,561
Ottawa South	PC	PC	13,472	47.51%	1,121	3.95%	61.78%	13,472	12,351	2,531	–	–	28,354
Ottawa West	PC	PC	12,707	49.41%	5,964	23.19%	60.81%	12,707	6,743	6,266	–	–	25,716
Oxford	PC	Lib	12,323	44.35%	1,368	4.92%	72.59%	10,955	12,323	4,507	–	–	27,785
Parry Sound	PC	PC	7,813	56.15%	2,794	20.08%	67.60%	7,813	5,019	1,083	–	–	13,915
Peel North	New	PC	15,651	52.30%	8,236	27.52%	65.27%	15,651	6,861	7,415	–	–	29,927
Peel South	New	PC	13,377	42.13%	3,618	11.39%	67.94%	13,377	9,759	8,616	–	–	31,752
Perth	PC	Lib	9,971	43.45%	187	0.81%	65.70%	9,784	9,971	3,191	–	–	22,946
Peterborough	PC	NDP	15,432	45.34%	2,759	8.11%	74.64%	12,673	5,930	15,432	–	–	34,035
Port Arthur	PC	Lib	7,636	37.56%	810	3.98%	71.21%	6,826	7,636	5,866	–	–	20,328
Prescott and Russell	New	PC	8,406	58.48%	3,274	22.78%	66.46%	8,406	5,132	835	–	–	14,373
Prince Edward—Lennox	PC	PC	7,471	57.76%	3,371	26.06%	60.54%	7,471	4,100	1,363	–	–	12,934
Quinte	New	PC	11,410	52.23%	4,091	18.73%	74.41%	11,410	7,319	3,117	–	–	21,846
Rainy River	PC	LL	3,130	34.29%	41	0.45%	63.93%	3,089	3,130	2,908	–	–	9,127
Renfrew North	PC	PC	10,401	62.15%	4,916	29.37%	66.33%	10,401	5,485	850	–	–	16,736
Renfrew South	PC	PC	7,776	52.77%	1,389	9.43%	75.85%	7,776	6,387	572	–	–	14,735
St. Catharines	New	PC	12,235	45.90%	3,948	14.81%	60.99%	12,235	8,287	6,134	–	–	26,656
Sandwich—Riverside	New	NDP	8,312	35.65%	799	3.43%	65.50%	7,492	7,513	8,312	–	–	23,317
Sarnia	New	Lib	9,590	44.20%	1,092	5.03%	60.68%	8,498	9,590	3,611	–	–	21,699
Sault Ste. Marie	PC	PC	11,807	42.21%	2,010	7.18%	77.85%	11,807	6,371	9,797	–	–	27,975
Simcoe Centre	PC	PC	10,814	52.03%	2,530	12.17%	66.22%	10,814	8,284	1,686	–	–	20,784
Simcoe East	PC	PC	9,057	54.54%	4,717	28.41%	61.19%	9,057	4,340	3,208	–	–	16,605
Stormont	PC	PC	10,942	57.63%	5,268	27.75%	66.36%	10,942	5,674	2,371	–	–	18,987
Sudbury	Lib	Lib	9,945	40.13%	2,540	10.25%	69.05%	7,405	9,945	7,266	–	167	24,783
Sudbury East	New	NDP	7,454	37.06%	1,200	5.97%	72.90%	6,254	6,088	7,454	–	319	20,115
Thunder Bay	New	NDP	4,064	37.57%	310	2.87%	68.40%	3,000	3,754	4,064	–	–	10,818
Temiskaming	PC	NDP	7,328	41.89%	293	1.67%	72.75%	7,035	3,131	7,328	–	–	17,494
Victoria—Haliburton	PC	PC	7,683	45.42%	1,836	10.85%	71.44%	7,683	5,847	3,384	–	–	16,914
Waterloo North	PC	Lib	8,336	36.79%	1,272	5.61%	59.37%	7,064	8,336	6,890	–	370	22,660
Waterloo South	PC	PC	10,044	44.68%	721	3.21%	70.49%	10,044	3,112	9,323	–	–	22,479
Welland	PC	PC	9,970	42.15%	260	1.10%	73.42%	9,970	3,971	9,710	–	–	23,651
Welland South	New	Lib	7,322	38.47%	107	0.56%	68.80%	7,215	7,322	4,497	–	–	19,034
Wellington—Dufferin	PC	PC	7,068	60.76%	3,809	32.74%	61.41%	7,068	3,259	1,306	–	–	11,633
Wellington South	Lib	Lib	12,553	46.91%	4,427	16.54%	73.97%	8,126	12,553	6,082	–	–	26,761
Wentworth	PC	NDP	9,183	43.83%	1,984	9.47%	66.69%	7,199	4,571	9,183	–	–	20,953
Wentworth North	New	PC	10,002	48.80%	3,660	17.86%	73.73%	10,002	4,152	6,342	–	–	20,496
Windsor—Walkerville	Lib	Lib	10,001	44.07%	1,799	7.93%	62.21%	4,490	10,001	8,202	–	–	22,693
Windsor West	New	NDP	8,618	37.66%	986	4.31%	59.73%	6,633	7,632	8,618	–	–	22,883
York Centre	New	Lib	10,025	40.77%	1,068	4.34%	68.17%	8,957	10,025	5,605	–	–	24,587
York North	PC	PC	8,394	42.46%	2,127	10.76%	63.52%	8,394	6,267	5,109	–	–	19,770
Armourdale	PC	PC	10,721	44.32%	3,855	15.94%	66.38%	10,721	6,866	6,602	–	–	24,189
Beaches—Woodbine	New	NDP	10,522	43.58%	545	2.26%	66.78%	9,977	3,646	10,522	–	–	24,145
Bellwoods	PC	PC	6,647	47.34%	2,429	17.30%	64.74%	6,647	4,218	2,684	491	–	14,040
Don Mills	PC	PC	9,646	41.45%	899	3.86%	66.43%	9,646	4,656	8,747	–	222	23,271
Dovercourt	Lib	Lib	6,053	37.93%	1,169	7.33%	57.38%	4,884	6,053	4,594	–	426	15,957
Downsview	Lib	Lib	8,876	36.56%	21	0.09%	58.90%	6,290	8,876	8,855	260	–	24,281
Eglinton	PC	PC	15,220	54.24%	6,827	24.33%	77.88%	15,220	8,393	4,449	–	–	28,062
Etobicoke	Lib	Lib	13,120	42.79%	3,982	12.99%	69.64%	8,402	13,120	9,138	–	–	30,660
High Park	PC	NDP	12,892	49.61%	6,275	24.15%	70.63%	6,477	6,617	12,892	–	–	25,986
Humber	PC	Lib	8,038	34.50%	149	0.64%	64.79%	7,370	8,038	7,889	–	–	23,297
Lakeshore	PC	NDP	10,029	48.45%	2,993	14.46%	64.39%	7,036	3,633	10,029	–	–	20,698
Parkdale	Lib	Lib	5,588	38.63%	810	5.60%	61.40%	4,099	5,588	4,778	–	–	14,465
Riverdale	PC	NDP	10,716	53.96%	4,549	22.91%	60.11%	6,167	2,690	10,716	–	287	19,860
St. Andrew—St. Patrick	New	PC	6,142	40.97%	1,172	7.82%	58.45%	6,142	4,970	3,707	172	–	14,991
St. David	PC	PC	7,581	36.62%	815	3.94%	64.28%	7,581	6,766	6,354	–	–	20,701
St. George	PC	PC	9,708	44.17%	2,482	11.29%	58.82%	9,708	7,226	5,046	–	–	21,980
Scarborough Centre	PC	NDP	12,892	49.61%	6,275	24.15%	71.26%	6,477	6,617	12,892	–	–	25,986
Scarborough East	PC	Lib	6,538	34.20%	220	1.15%	67.67%	6,318	6,538	6,260	–	–	19,116
Scarborough North	PC	PC	11,729	42.03%	1,527	5.47%	70.66%	11,729	5,977	10,202	–	–	27,908
Scarborough West	NDP	NDP	13,225	48.12%	4,821	17.54%	69.11%	8,404	5,856	13,225	–	–	27,485
York East	PC	PC	12,691	44.80%	4,456	15.73%	64.92%	12,691	8,235	7,402	–	–	28,328
York-Forest Hill	PC	PC	12,087	43.86%	3,644	13.22%	62.19%	12,087	7,030	8,443	–	–	27,560
York Mills	PC	PC	22,192	50.08%	6,490	14.65%	64.60%	22,192	15,702	6,418	–	–	44,312
York South	NDP	NDP	13,073	62.59%	7,990	38.25%	59.78%	5,083	2,732	13,073	–	–	20,888
York West	PC	PC	14,780	47.53%	2,351	7.56%	65.77%	14,780	12,429	3,885	–	–	31,094
Yorkview	NDP	NDP	13,437	46.00%	3,073	10.52%	62.27%	5,413	10,364	13,437	–	–	29,214

= open seat
= turnout is above provincial average
= winning candidate was in previous Legislature
= not incumbent; was previously elected to the Legislature
= incumbent had switched allegiance
= incumbency arose from byelection gain
= previously incumbent in another riding
= other incumbents renominated
= previously an MP in the House of Commons of Canada
= Liberal-Labour candidate
= multiple candidates

=== Analysis ===
Party candidates in 2nd place
Party in 1st place	Party in 2nd place			Total
Party in 1st place	PC	Lib	NDP	Total
Progressive Conservative		55	14	69
Liberal	21		6	27
Liberal–Labour	1			1
New Democratic	13	7		20
Total	35	62	20	117

Candidates ranked 1st to 4th place, by party
Parties	1st	2nd	3rd	4th
█ Progressive Conservative	69	35	13	
█ Liberal	27	62	26	
█ New Democratic	20	20	77	
█ Liberal–Labour	1		1	
█ Social Credit				7
█ Independent				5
█ Communist				2
█ Socialist Labor				1

Resulting composition of the 28th Legislative Assembly
Source		Party				
Source		PC	Lib	Lib-Lab	NDP	Total
Seats retained	Incumbents returned	45	12		3	60
Seats retained	Open seats held	4	1		1	6
Seats changing hands	Incumbents defeated	2	5		6	13
Seats changing hands	Open seats gained	1	1	1	4	7
Seats changing hands	Byelection gains held	1			1	2
New ridings	New MPPs	9	6		5	20
New ridings	Won by previous incumbent from another riding	7	2			9
Total		69	27	1	20	117

=== Incumbents standing in other ridings ===
Eleven MPPs lost their seats in the current redistribution and sought reelection elsewhere. A further four chose to campaign in another riding.

Member	From	To
Original riding abolished
Bert Lawrence	Russell	Carleton East
Darcy McKeough	Kent West	Chatham—Kent
Eddie Sargent	Grey North	Grey—Bruce
George Kerr	Halton	Halton West
Reg Gisborn	Wentworth East	Hamilton East (Note: not a new riding)
Jack Spence	Kent East	Kent
Lorne Henderson	Lambton East	Lambton
Bill Davis	Peel	Peel North
Allan Grossman	St. Andrew	St. Andrew—St. Patrick
Moved over to other riding
Norman Davison	Hamilton East	Hamilton Centre
Ada Pritchard	Hamilton Centre	Hamilton West
Ray Connell	Hamilton—Wentworth (Note: name changed to Hamilton West)	Wentworth North (Note: new riding)
Failed to secure reelection
Keith Butler	Waterloo North	Kitchener (Note: defeated by Jim Breithaupt (Liberal))
Ivan Thrasher	Windsor—Sandwich (Note: abolished riding)	Windsor West (Note: defeated by Hugh Peacock (NDP))
Jack Harris	Beaches	Beaches—Woodbine (Note: defeated by John L. Brown (NDP))

== See also ==
- Politics of Ontario
- List of Canadian political parties#Ontario
- Premier of Ontario
- Leader of the Opposition (Ontario)
