= Samuel Lawrence (Canadian politician) =

Canadian politician and trade unionist

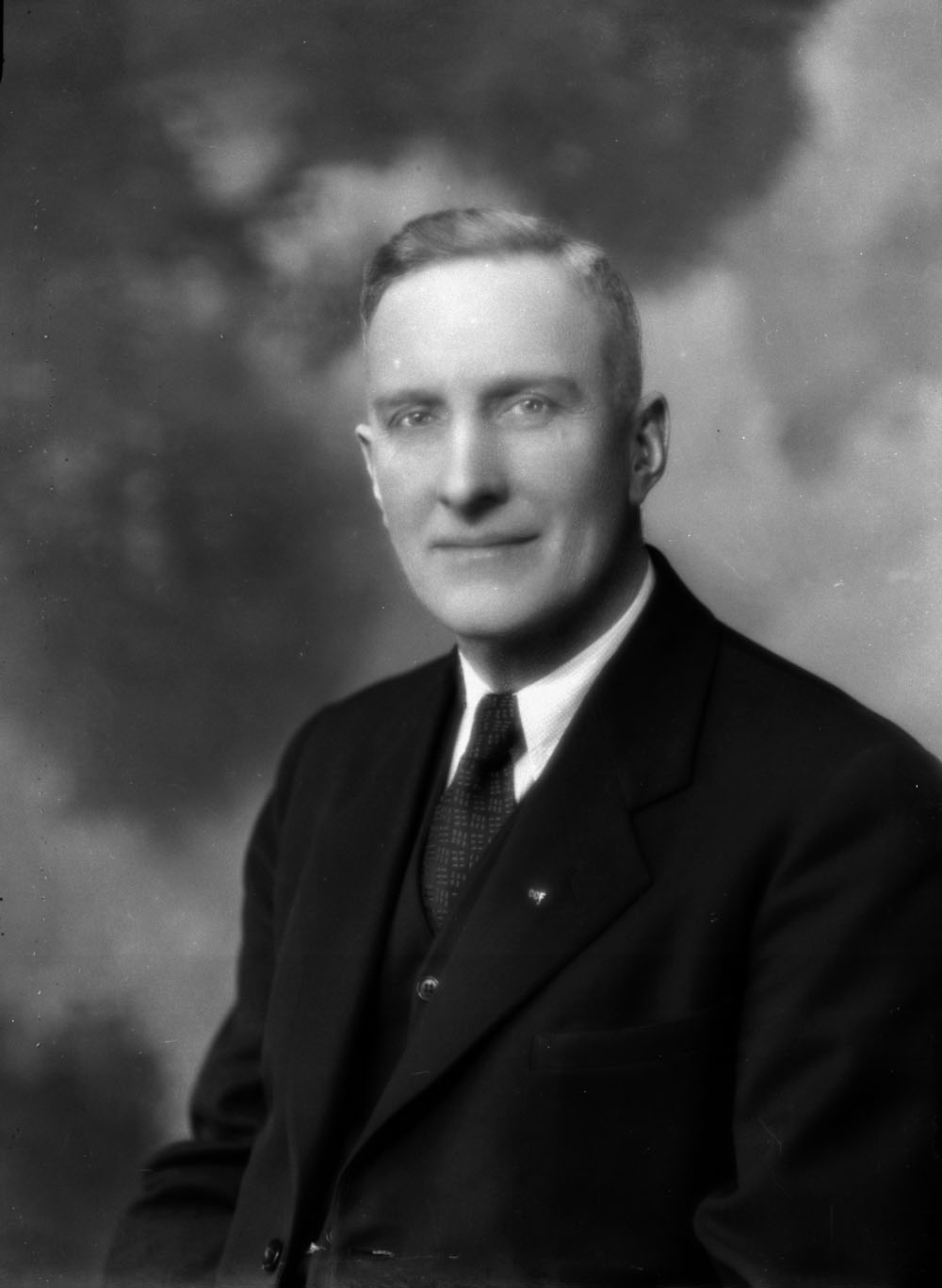
- Lawrence, c. 1937

MPP for Hamilton East
- In office 1934–1937
- Preceded by: William Morrison
- Succeeded by: John P. MacKay

Mayor of Hamilton
- In office January 1, 1944 – December 31, 1949
- Preceded by: William Morrison
- Succeeded by: Lloyd Jackson

Personal details
- Born: August 16, 1879 Norton-sub-Hamdon, Somerset, England
- Died: October 25, 1959 (aged 80) Hamilton, Ontario, Canada
- Resting place: Hamilton Cemetery
- Party: Ontario CCF
- Other political affiliations: Canadian Labour Party, Independent Labour Party (until 1932)
- Spouse: Isabelle Marshall (1877-1957)
- Relations: William Lawrence (father) and Ann Geard (mother)
- Children: Arthur William Francis(son), Leonard George (son), Sidney James (son), Marion Isabelle (daughter)
- Occupation: Stonemason

Samuel Lawrence (August 16, 1879 – October 25, 1959) was a Canadian politician and trade unionist. He was the first member of the Co-operative Commonwealth Federation elected to the Legislative Assembly of Ontario and subsequently served as Mayor of Hamilton, Ontario.

Lawrence was born in Somerset, England and went to work in a quarry at the age of 12. He became a shop steward in the Operative Stonemasons' Union at the age of 18. He entered politics, running for election in Battersea in London.

Known as "Mr. Labour", Sam Lawrence was an alderman, controller, and the Mayor of Hamilton, Ontario from 1944 to 1949. He was also President of the Stone Cutters' Union, Vice-President of the Hamilton Trades and Labour Council, and leader of the Co-operative Commonwealth Federation (CCF) party in the Ontario legislature as well as Ontario CCF president in the early 1940s

== Early years ==
Born in the Somerset village of Norton-sub-Hamdon to William Lawrence and Ann Geard on 16 August 1879, Sam was the fourth child in a family of 5 boys and 5 girls and he attended school from the age of 3 to 10. His father, who Sam described as a 'radical liberal', was a stonemason, and Sam gave him credit for the position he took in the Labour movement. At the age of 12, Lawrence was working twelve hours a day, from six to six, and was apprenticed to a stonemason at 13. He had served half his time when his father became the foreman at Arundel Castle, the principal seat of the Duke of Norfolk. Lawrence went to London at 17 and joined the Friendly Society of Operative Stonemasons of England, Ireland and Wales in Battersea and was shop steward at the age of 18.

Whilst serving in the Coldstream Guards during the Boer War, a young recruit by the name of Knobby Taylor loaned Lawrence "Looking Backward" by Edward Bellamy. Lawrence's experiences in the Boer War and Bellamy's American Utopian novel led to him becoming a socialist. In 1906, the then 27-year-old trade unionist and war veteran stood in an abortive election campaign for the Battersea Borough Council and, six years later, decided to follow three of his brothers and two sisters who had already gone to Canada.

== Career ==
Lawrence immigrated to Canada, settling in Hamilton, Ontario with his family in 1912. He immediately joined the Journeymen Stonecutters' Association of North America and found work as a stonemason. He became involved in the local labour movement and was elected to Hamilton, Ontario City Council as an Independent Labour Party alderman in 1922. He ran as a Labour candidate in the 1925 federal election but lost his bid for a seat in the House of Commons of Canada, coming in second. He remained on city council and was elected to Hamilton's Board of Control in 1929, retaining his seat until 1934 when he was elected to the Legislative Assembly of Ontario as the Member of the Legislative Assembly (MLA) for Hamilton East, the first Co-operative Commonwealth Federation (CCF) MLA ever elected in Ontario. He was also the only CCFer elected in the 1934 election, and was defeated in his bid for re-election in the 1937 election. He was elected Ontario CCF president in 1941, and served as Mayor of Hamilton from 1944 to 1949 leading a CCF slate in that city.

Lawrence then served for a time as president of the local Industrial Union Council, and subsequently regained his seat on the Board of Control and kept it for six years. He was elected the first Labour mayor of Hamilton in the 1944 municipal election and was re-elected mayor annually until his retirement from the office in 1949.

During his tenure as mayor, the city went through the deeply divisive 85-day Stelco strike of 1946. The strike was the union's first, and its victory established the United Steel Workers of America as a major force in Canada. It also helped establish the right of Canadian workers to collective bargaining. Lawrence was publicly supportive of the strike, and led a 10,000-person march from Woodlawns Park to the gates of Stelco. Despite pressure from the federal and provincial governments, he refused to call in police or the military against the illegal strike, and thus helped ensure its victory. When the federal government sent the army in, Lawrence angrily stated that "the government was acting as the nation's chief strike breaker."

After stepping down as mayor in 1949, Lawrence continued on the Board of Control for six years until his retirement from politics.

=== Legacy ===
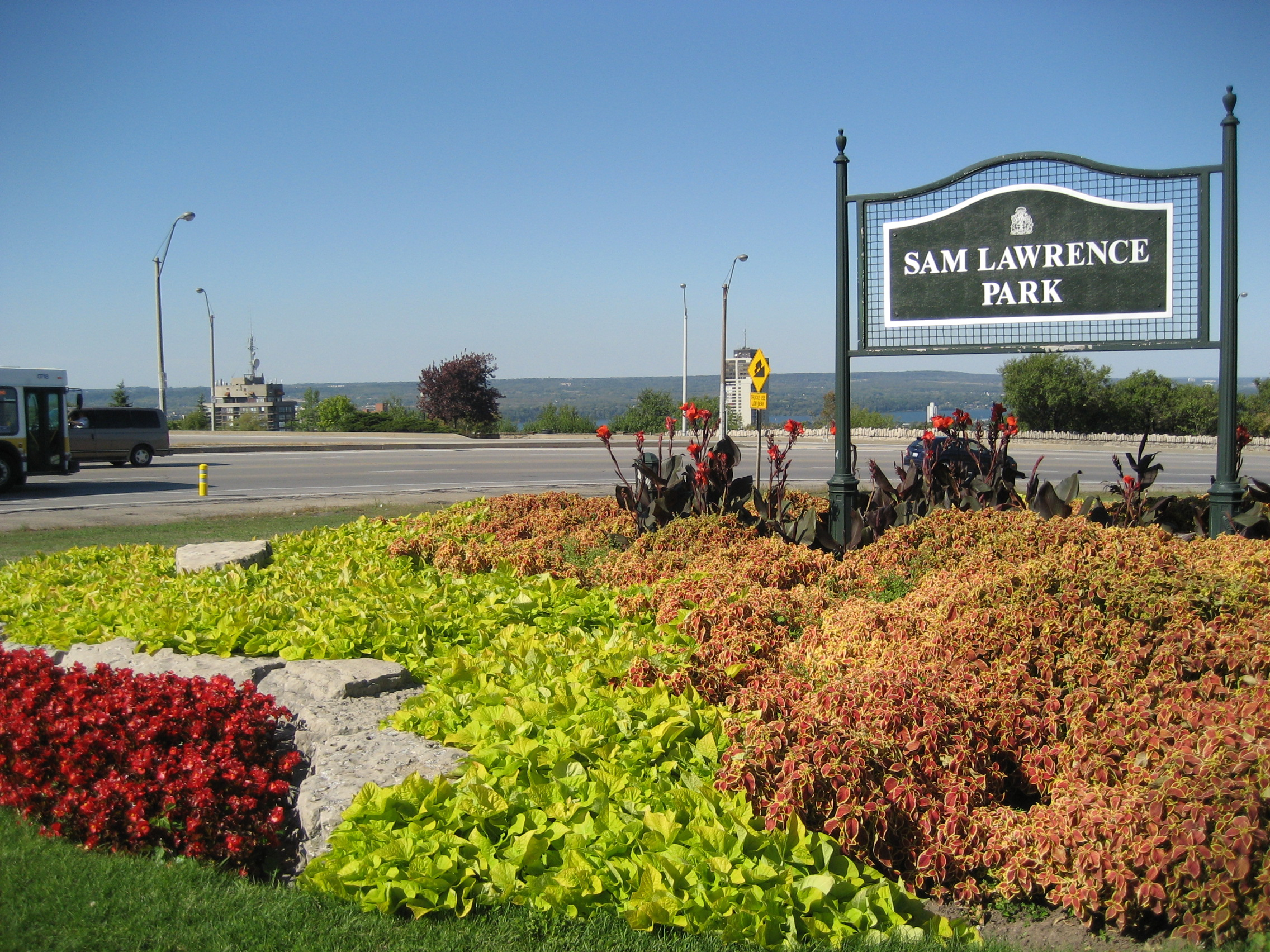
Sam Lawrence Park, Hamilton

Sam Lawrence Park can be found on the western-end of Concession Street. Prior to 1944, this property was the Webb Quarry. In February 1944, The City of Hamilton was given 3 acres (12,000 m^{2}) of land for park use by Thomas Hambly Ross, MP (Hamilton East), and his wife Olive. The park was originally named Ross Park, then renamed Patton Park in 1946, in honour of Captain John MacMillan Stevenson Patton, a Hamiltonian who risked his life during World War II by moving an unexploded bomb away from an aircraft plant. For this exploit he received the first George Cross for Valour. In 1960, the park was renamed to honour Sam Lawrence. During 1990 to 1994, Sam Lawrence Park underwent a major upgrading that included repairing the stone walls, installing new walkways, site lighting, site furniture, and the redevelopment of the major rock gardens.

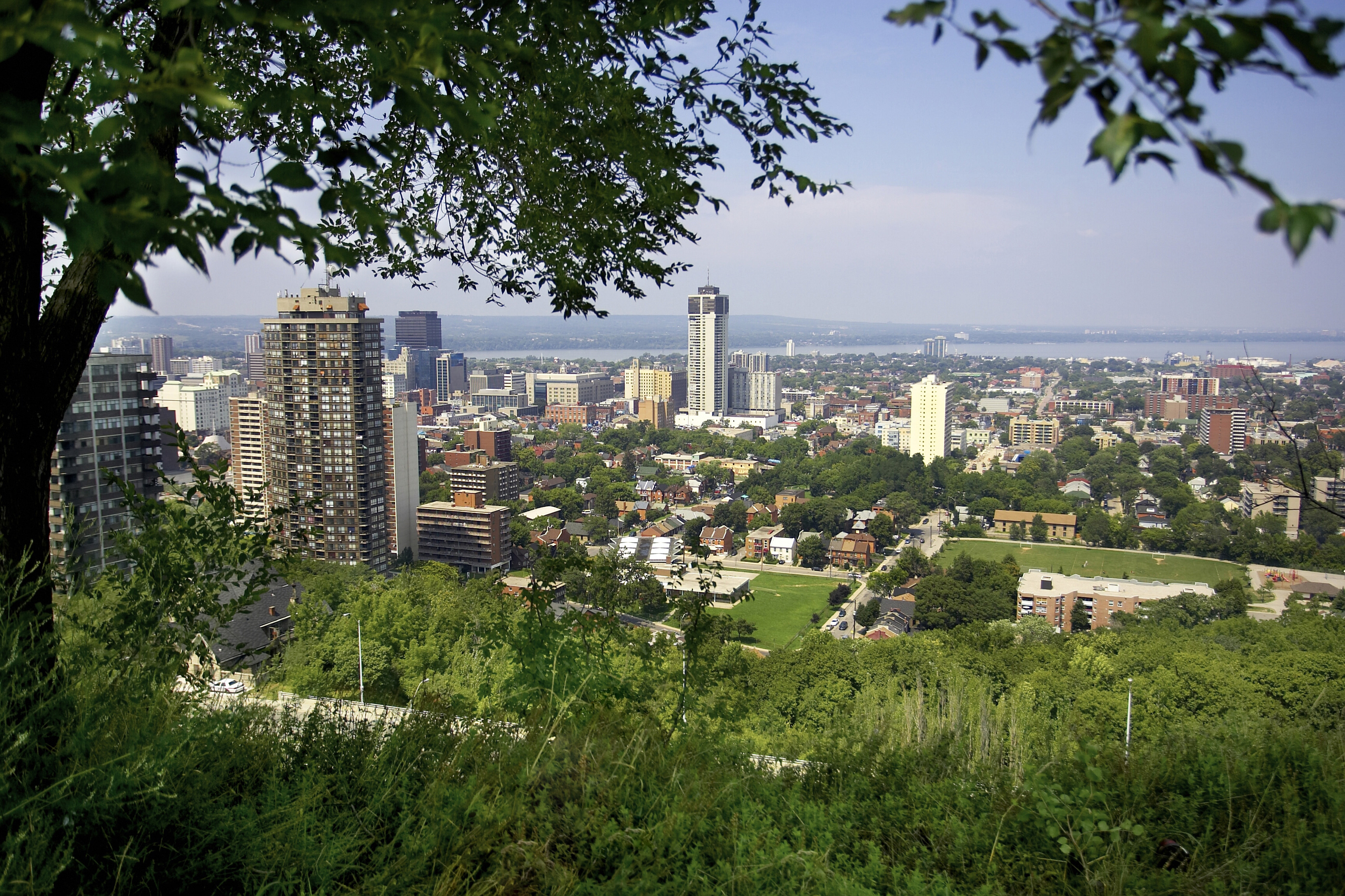
Photograph of downtown Hamilton, Ontario taken from Sam Lawrence Park

When the (Ontario) Workers Arts and Heritage Centre purchased the historic Custom House on Stuart Street in the north end of Hamilton in 1996, they began hosting an annual Sam Lawrence Dinner after their November AGM.
