= Robert W. Mackenzie =

Canadian politician

Bob Mackenzie
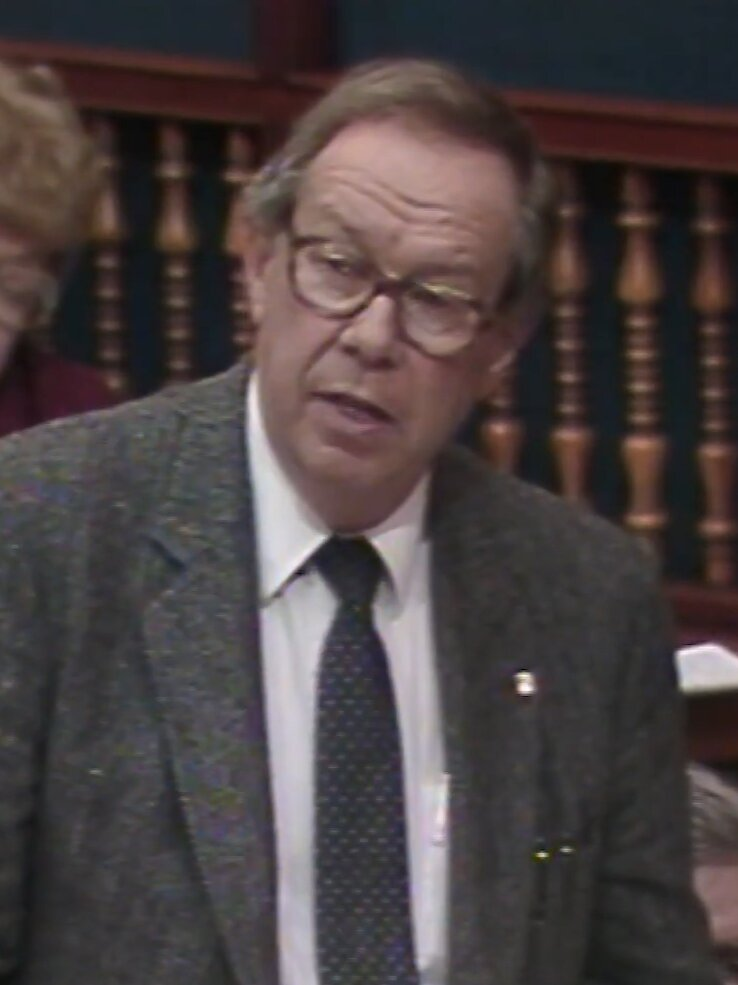
- Mackenzie in 1986

Ontario MPP
- In office 1975–1995
- Preceded by: Reg Gisborn
- Succeeded by: Dominic Agostino
- Constituency: Hamilton East

Personal details
- Born: Robert Warren Mackenzie; June 6, 1928 Orillia, Ontario, Canada
- Died: January 17, 2011 (aged 82)
- Party: New Democrat
- Spouse: Sylvia
- Children: 6
- Occupation: Labour union executive

Robert Warren Mackenzie (June 26, 1928 – January 17, 2011) was a politician in Ontario, Canada. He was a New Democratic Party member of the Legislative Assembly of Ontario from 1975 to 1995, and a prominent cabinet minister in the government of Bob Rae.

== Background ==
Mackenzie was a longtime member of Canada's union movement. He was raised in western Quebec, and quit school after grade seven to work at the E.B. Eddy Company paper mill in Hull. He later worked as a merchant seaman, and claims that he was introduced to social democracy in this period by a Scandinavian co-worker. He later moved to Windsor, Ontario, and worked in an auto plant. Finally settling in Hamilton, he was a member of the United Steelworkers of America Local 5328 and an executive member of the Hamilton and District Labour Council. His son Andrew Mackenzie ran for the Hamilton East seat, but was defeated by Liberal Dominic Agostino. His son David was a personal advisor to New Democratic Party leader, Jack Layton. He had four other children.

== Politics ==
Mackenzie ran for provincial office in the provincial election of 1955, as a candidate of the Ontario CCF in the riding of Windsor—Walkerville. He finished second, losing to Progressive Conservative M.C. Davies by about 3,000 votes.

He ran for the House of Commons of Canada for the federal New Democratic Party in the 1972 federal election, but finished third in the riding of Hamilton—Wentworth in a close three-way race. He ran again in the 1974 federal election, and lost by a wider margin. Progressive Conservative candidate Sean O'Sullivan won the riding on both occasions.

=== In opposition ===
Mackenzie was elected to the Ontario legislature in the provincial election of 1975, winning the working class riding of Hamilton East by a wide margin. He was re-elected in the elections of 1977, 1981, 1985, 1987 and 1990. The only time he faced a serious challenge was in 1985, when Liberal Shirley Collins came within 1,600 votes of defeating him. On all other occasions, he won by significant margins. Mackenzie supported Bob Rae for the NDP leadership in 1982.

Following the inconclusive 1985 election, the NDP under Bob Rae allowed the Liberal Party under David Peterson to form a minority government, which lasted for two years. Mackenzie was part of a minority group in the NDP caucus that recommended supporting the Progressive Conservatives instead, on the grounds that urban-based "Red Tories" would be more likely to support labour issues than the Liberal Party (which was then dominated by rural members). Mackenzie served as his party's Labour Critic from 1985 to 1990.

=== In government ===
The NDP won a majority government in the 1990 provincial election, and Mackenzie was appointed as the province's Minister of Labour on October 1 of that year. In 1992, he helped navigate the passage of Bill 40, which introduced anti-scab provisions during strikes and other positions supported by the labour movement. The bill became law on January 1, 1993, and is generally regarded as one of the most labour-friendly bills in recent Ontario history. Mackenzie also introduced legislation dealing with pay equity for nurses and child-care attendants, and extended unionization rights to farm workers. In 1993, he accepted the Rae government's Social Contract legislation as necessary for the province.

In office, Mackenzie was known as a passionate supporter of labour interests within cabinet. Journalist Thomas Walkom recounted the following story in his book, Rae Days:

"At one early cabinet meeting, for instance, Mackenzie had just finished delivering a passionate plea for aid to jobless Steelworkers in the hard-hit uranium-mining town of Elliot Lake. Suddenly Energy minister Jenny Carter spoke up. "Why bother?" said the Peterborough anti-nuclear activist. "They'll all be dead of cancer soon anyway." Mackenzie, according to one participant at the meeting, was so furious he literally lunged across the cabinet table at the hapless Carter. Luckily, it was a wide table."

There was some controversy in early 1994 when Mackenzie's son David was hired as a special advisor to the Premier's office. Mackenzie resigned as Labour Minister on October 20, 1994, and did not seek re-election in 1995.

=== Cabinet positions ===
Rae ministry, Province of Ontario (1990–1995)
Cabinet post (1)
Predecessor	Office	Successor
Gerry Phillips	Minister of Labour; 1990–1994	Shirley Coppen

== Later life ==
In 2004, Mackenzie supported Andrea Horwath's successful campaign to replace Agostino in a by-election.

Mackenzie died on January 17, 2011, at the age of 82.
