= William Herbert Connor =

Canadian politician and salesman

MPP for Hamilton East
- In office August 4, 1943 – March 24, 1945
- Preceded by: John P. MacKay
- Succeeded by: Robert Ellsworth Elliott

Personal details
- Born: March 27, 1895 Hamilton, Ontario
- Party: CCF

William Herbert Connor (March 27, 1895 – 1977) was a salesman and political figure in Ontario. He represented Hamilton East in the Legislative Assembly of Ontario from 1943 to 1945 as a Co-operative Commonwealth member.

He was born in Hamilton, the son of John Connor and Helen Peters. In 1920, Connor married Lily May Broom. He ran unsuccessfully for a seat in the Ontario assembly as a CCF candidate in 1935.
