= John Lawrence Dowling =

Canadian politician from Ontario

Member of the Ontario Provincial Parliament for Hamilton East
- In office June 7, 1948 – October 6, 1951
- Preceded by: Robert Ellsworth Elliott
- Succeeded by: Robert Ellsworth Elliott

Personal details
- Party: Co-operative Commonwealth

John Lawrence Dowling was a Canadian politician who served as the Co-operative Commonwealth MPP for Hamilton East from 1948 to 1951.

== See also ==
- 23rd Parliament of Ontario
