= Halton West (provincial electoral district) =

Former provincial electoral district in Ontario, Canada

Ontario electoral district

Defunct provincial electoral district
- Legislature: Legislative Assembly of Ontario
- District created: 1967
- District abolished: 1975
- First contested: 1967
- Last contested: 1971

Halton West was a provincial electoral district in Ontario, Canada. It existed from 1967 to 1975, when it was abolished alongside Halton East when the riding was redistributed to Halton Centre and Halton North. It consisted of the western parts of the Halton region.

== History ==
In its history it was represented by Progressive Conservative George Albert Kerr.

== Members ==
Halton West
Assembly	Years	Member	Party
Riding created out of Halton
28th	1967–1971	George Albert Kerr	Progressive Conservative
29th	1971–1975	George Albert Kerr	Progressive Conservative
Riding dissolved into Halton Centre and Halton North

== Election results ==
1971 Ontario general election
Party	Candidate	Votes	%	±%
Progressive Conservative	George Albert Kerr	25,136	59.53	+10.43
Liberal	Bob McNutt	8,783	20.80	–2.08
New Democratic	Walter Mulkewich	8,306	19.67	–8.35
Total valid votes		42,225	99.68	
Total rejected ballots		137	0.32	–0.30
Turnout		42,362	76.20	+9.41
Eligible voters		55,590		
Progressive Conservative hold		Swing		+6.26
Source: Elections Ontario

1967 Ontario general election
Party	Candidate	Votes	%
Progressive Conservative	George Albert Kerr	13,709	49.10
New Democratic	Ted MacDonald	7,823	28.02
Liberal	Jack Lush	6,389	22.88
Total valid votes		27,921	99.38
Total rejected ballots		175	0.62
Turnout		28,096	66.79
Eligible voters		42,065	
Progressive Conservative pickup new district.			
Source: Elections Ontario

== See also ==
- List of Ontario provincial electoral districts
- Canadian provincial electoral districts
