= Hamilton East (provincial electoral district) =

Former provincial electoral district in Ontario, Canada

Hamilton East is a provincial electoral district in Ontario, Canada. It was represented in the Legislative Assembly of Ontario from 1894 to 2007, when it was redistributed between the new ridings of Hamilton Centre and Hamilton East—Stoney Creek. It was originally created from the old riding of Hamilton, split in 1894 to create Hamilton East and Hamilton West.

It was considered a working class district.

== History ==
This riding elected the first Co-operative Commonwealth Federation Member of the Legislative Assembly (MLA) to the Ontario legislature: Samuel Lawrence in the 1934 provincial election. The riding had previously elected Ontario's first ever provincial Labour MLA Allan Studholme in a 1906 by-election. Studholme remained in office until his death in 1919 when he was succeeded in by another Labour MLA, George Grant Halcrow (1919–1923).

It was last represented provincially by Andrea Horwath of the Ontario New Democratic Party. In the 2007 election, Horwath was reelected in the successor riding of Hamilton Centre.

== Members of Provincial Parliament ==
Hamilton East
Assembly	Years	Member	Party
Riding created from Hamilton
8th	1894–1898	James Taylor Middleton	Liberal
9th	1898–1902	Henry Carscallen	Conservative
10th	1902–1905	Henry Carscallen	Conservative
11th	1905–1906	Henry Carscallen	Conservative
11th	1906–1908	Allan Studholme	Labour
12th	1908–1911	Allan Studholme	Labour
13th	1911–1914	Allan Studholme	Labour
14th	1914–1919	Allan Studholme	Labour
15th	1919–1923	George Grant Halcrow	Labour
16th	1923–1926	Leeming Carr	Conservative
17th	1926–1928	Leeming Carr	Conservative
17th	1928–1929	William Morrison	Conservative
18th	1929–1934	William Morrison	Conservative
19th	1934–1937	Samuel Lawrence	Co-operative Commonwealth
20th	1937–1943	John P. MacKay	Liberal
21st	1943–1945	William Herbert Connor	Co-operative Commonwealth
22nd	1945–1948	Robert Ellsworth Elliott	Progressive Conservative
23rd	1948–1951	John Lawrence Dowling	Co-operative Commonwealth
24th	1951–1955	Robert Ellsworth Elliott	Progressive Conservative
25th	1955–1959	Robert Ellsworth Elliott	Progressive Conservative
26th	1959–1963	Norman Davison	Co-operative Commonwealth
27th	1963–1967	Norman Davison	New Democratic
28th	1967–1971	Reg Gisborn	New Democratic
29th	1971–1975	Reg Gisborn	New Democratic
30th	1975–1977	Bob Mackenzie	New Democratic
31st	1977–1981	Bob Mackenzie	New Democratic
32nd	1981–1985	Bob Mackenzie	New Democratic
33rd	1985–1987	Bob Mackenzie	New Democratic
34th	1987–1990	Bob Mackenzie	New Democratic
35th	1990–1995	Bob Mackenzie	New Democratic
36th	1995–1999	Dominic Agostino	Liberal
37th	1999–2003	Dominic Agostino	Liberal
38th	2003–2004	Dominic Agostino	Liberal
38th	2004–2007	Andrea Horwath	New Democratic
Riding dissolved into Hamilton Centre and Hamilton East—Stoney Creek

== Election results ==
Ontario provincial by-election, May 13, 2004 Death of Dominic Agostino
Party	Candidate	Votes	%	±%
New Democratic	Andrea Horwath	15,185	63.55	+34.13
Liberal	Ralph Agostino	6,362	26.63	–25.53
Progressive Conservative	Tara Crugnale	1,772	7.42	–5.72
Green	Raymond Dartsch	451	1.89	+0.05
Independent	John Turmel	123	0.51	–
Total valid votes		23,893	99.33	
Total rejected, unmarked and declined ballots		161	0.67	–0.28
Turnout		24,054	36.27	–10.46
Eligible voters		66,320		
New Democratic gain from Liberal		Swing		+29.83
Source: Elections Ontario

2003 Ontario general election
Party	Candidate	Votes	%	±%
Liberal	Dominic Agostino	16,015	52.15	–1.57
New Democratic	Bob Sutton	9,035	29.42	+10.49
Progressive Conservative	Sohail Bhatti	4,033	13.13	–9.13
Green	Raymond Dartsch	563	1.83	+0.34
Communist	Bob Mann	380	1.24	+0.37
Independent	Kelly Greenaway	378	1.23	–
Family Coalition	Michael Izzotti	304	0.99	–0.17
Total valid votes		30,708	99.05	
Total rejected, unmarked and declined ballots		294	0.95	–0.99
Turnout		31,002	46.73	–5.99
Eligible voters		66,348		
Liberal hold		Swing		–6.03
Source: Elections Ontario

1999 Ontario general election
Party	Candidate	Votes	%	±%
Liberal	Dominic Agostino	17,891	53.73	+10.18
Progressive Conservative	Peter Preston	7,414	22.26	–2.33
New Democratic	Bob Sutton	6,304	18.93	–8.72
Green	Jim Howlett	496	1.49	–
Family Coalition	Edgar Breau	386	1.16	–1.52
Communist	Bob Mann	288	0.86	–0.66
Independent	Julie Gordon	263	0.79	–
Natural Law	Laureen Amos	258	0.77	–
Total valid votes		33,300	98.06	
Total rejected, unmarked and declined ballots		659	1.94	+0.29
Turnout		33,959	52.72	–5.13
Eligible voters		64,418		
Liberal hold		Swing		+6.26
Source: Elections Ontario

1995 Ontario general election
Party	Candidate	Votes	%	±%
Liberal	Dominic Agostino	11,088	43.55	+24.05
New Democratic	Andrew MacKenzie	7,042	27.66	–43.95
Progressive Conservative	Don Sheppard	6,263	24.60	+18.68
Family Coalition	Angela Corvaro	681	2.67	–0.31
Communist	Bob Mann	389	1.53	–
Total valid votes		25,463	98.35	
Total rejected, unmarked and declined ballots		427	1.65	+0.12
Turnout		25,890	57.85	–3.85
Eligible voters		44,757		
Liberal gain from New Democratic		Swing		+34.00
Source: Elections Ontario

1990 Ontario general election
Party	Candidate	Votes	%	±%
New Democratic	Robert W. Mackenzie	20,289	71.60	+14.78
Liberal	Craig Dowhaniuk	5,525	19.50	–14.72
Progressive Conservative	Ron Tomblin	1,676	5.91	–0.71
Family Coalition	Emidio Corvaro	846	2.99	–
Total valid votes		28,336	98.47	
Total rejected, unmarked and declined ballots		440	1.53	+0.83
Turnout		28,776	61.70	+1.58
Eligible voters		46,640		
New Democratic hold		Swing		+14.75
Source: Elections Ontario

1987 Ontario general election
Party	Candidate	Votes	%	±%
New Democratic	Robert W. Mackenzie	16,421	56.82	+13.03
Liberal	David Bach	9,890	34.22	–4.49
Progressive Conservative	Tommy Tarpos	1,915	6.63	–10.12
Communist	Robert (Bob) Jaggard	673	2.33	+1.58
Total valid votes		28,899	99.30	
Total rejected ballots		204	0.70	+0.16
Turnout		29,103	60.12	–0.84
Eligible voters		48,407		
New Democratic hold		Swing		+8.76
Source: Elections Ontario

1985 Ontario general election
Party	Candidate	Votes	%	±%
New Democratic	Robert W. Mackenzie	13,774	43.80	–2.67
Liberal	Shirley Collins	12,174	38.71	+8.28
Progressive Conservative	Fred Lombardo	5,268	16.75	–6.35
Communist	Kerry Wilson	234	0.74	–
Total valid votes		31,450	99.46	
Total rejected ballots		171	0.54	+0.07
Turnout		31,621	60.96	+6.05
Eligible voters		51,872		
New Democratic hold		Swing		–5.47
Source: Elections Ontario

1981 Ontario general election
Party	Candidate	Votes	%	±%
New Democratic	Robert W. Mackenzie	12,773	46.47	–0.63
Liberal	Mike Riley	8,365	30.43	+0.26
Progressive Conservative	Gabe Macaluso	6,351	23.10	+1.59
Total valid votes		27,489	99.53	
Total rejected ballots		131	0.47	–0.12
Turnout		27,620	54.91	–8.63
Eligible voters		50,302		
New Democratic hold		Swing		–0.44
Source: Elections Ontario

1977 Ontario general election
Party	Candidate	Votes	%	±%
New Democratic	Robert W. Mackenzie	14,461	47.09	–0.80
Liberal	Olga Varga	9,266	30.17	+1.34
Progressive Conservative	Fred Campbell	6,605	21.51	+0.22
Communist	Robert (Bob) Jaggard	376	1.22	–0.10
Total valid votes		30,708	99.40	
Total rejected ballots		184	0.60	–0.02
Turnout		30,892	63.54	–0.39
Eligible voters		48,620		
New Democratic hold		Swing		–1.07
Source: Elections Ontario

1975 Ontario general election
Party	Candidate	Votes	%	±%
New Democratic	Robert W. Mackenzie	14,415	47.89	+7.25
Liberal	Joe Rogers	8,679	28.83	–0.33
Progressive Conservative	Bob Hodgson	6,407	21.28	–8.91
Communist	Robert (Bob) Jaggard	398	1.32	–
Social Credit	Alcide-J. Hamelin	203	0.67	–
Total valid votes		30,102	99.39	
Total rejected ballots		186	0.61	–0.07
Turnout		30,288	63.93	–7.19
Eligible voters		47,379		
New Democratic hold		Swing		+3.79
Source: Elections Ontario

1971 Ontario general election
Party	Candidate	Votes	%	±%
New Democratic	Reg Gisborn	11,073	40.64	–11.32
Progressive Conservative	Nancy Beattie	8,227	30.19	+4.93
Liberal	William Awrey	7,947	29.17	+6.39
Total valid votes		27,247	99.31	
Total rejected ballots		189	0.69	–0.47
Turnout		27,436	71.11	+6.30
Eligible voters		38,581		
New Democratic hold		Swing		–8.12
Source: Elections Ontario

1967 Ontario general election
Party	Candidate	Votes	%	±%
New Democratic	Reg Gisborn	11,843	51.95	+15.24
Progressive Conservative	Fred W. Whitehouse	5,759	25.26	–5.62
Liberal	Edwin C. Hammond	5,193	22.78	–9.62
Total valid votes		22,795	98.84	
Total rejected ballots		267	1.16	+0.17
Turnout		23,062	64.82	–0.44
Eligible voters		35,580		
New Democratic hold		Swing		+10.43
Source: Elections Ontario

1963 Ontario general election
Party	Candidate	Votes	%	±%
New Democratic	Norman Davison	8,097	36.71	–4.89
Liberal	Morris Lazarowich	7,145	32.40	+13.34
Progressive Conservative	Quinto Martini	6,812	30.89	–5.30
Total valid votes		22,054	99.02	
Total rejected ballots		219	0.98	–1.11
Turnout		22,273	65.26	+10.36
Eligible voters		34,129		
New Democratic hold		Swing		–9.12
Source: Elections Ontario

1959 Ontario general election
Party	Candidate	Votes	%	±%
Co-operative Commonwealth	Norman Davison	7,805	41.61	+9.63
Progressive Conservative	Robert Ellsworth Elliott	6,788	36.19	+0.06
Liberal	William A. James	3,574	19.05	–9.57
Labor–Progressive	Donald A. Stewart	591	3.15	–0.12
Total valid votes		18,758	97.90	
Total rejected ballots		402	2.10	–0.16
Turnout		19,160	54.90	–1.99
Eligible voters		34,898		
Co-operative Commonwealth gain from Progressive Conservative		Swing		+4.78
Source: Elections Ontario

1955 Ontario general election
Party	Candidate	Votes	%	±%
Progressive Conservative	Robert Ellsworth Elliott	7,444	36.13	–8.23
Co-operative Commonwealth	John Morgan	6,590	31.98	–3.59
Liberal	Samuel Leslie Parker	5,898	28.62	+8.55
Labor–Progressive	Helen Coulson	674	3.27	–
Total valid votes		20,606	97.74	
Total rejected ballots		476	2.26	+0.94
Turnout		21,082	56.90	–4.25
Eligible voters		37,054		
Progressive Conservative hold		Swing		–2.32
Source: Elections Ontario

1951 Ontario general election
Party	Candidate	Votes	%	±%
Progressive Conservative	Robert Ellsworth Elliott	9,336	44.36	+2.16
Co-operative Commonwealth	John Lawrence Dowling	7,486	35.57	–7.25
Liberal	Charles Paul	4,224	20.07	+5.09
Total valid votes		21,046	98.68	
Total rejected ballots		281	1.32	+0.43
Turnout		21,327	61.15	–8.65
Eligible voters		34,878		
Progressive Conservative gain from Co-operative Commonwealth		Swing		+4.71
Source: Elections Ontario

1948 Ontario general election
Party	Candidate	Votes	%	±%
Co-operative Commonwealth	John Lawrence Dowling	10,528	42.82	+11.94
Progressive Conservative	Robert Ellsworth Elliott	10,375	42.20	+0.50
Liberal	William Momotiuk	3,683	14.98	–2.57
Total valid votes		24,586	99.11	
Total rejected ballots		221	0.89	–0.30
Turnout		24,807	69.79	–2.87
Eligible voters		35,543		
Co-operative Commonwealth gain from Progressive Conservative		Swing		+5.72
Source: Elections Ontario

1945 Ontario general election
Party	Candidate	Votes	%	±%
Progressive Conservative	Robert Ellsworth Elliott	10,561	41.70	+12.85
Co-operative Commonwealth	William Herbert Connor	7,822	30.89	–3.47
Liberal	William Momotiuk	4,445	17.55	–7.02
Labor–Progressive	Harry Hunter	2,291	9.05	–
Socialist-Labour	Leonard Palmer	207	0.82	–0.91
Total valid votes		25,326	98.81	
Total rejected ballots		305	1.19	+0.24
Turnout		25,631	72.67	+11.16
Eligible voters		35,271		
Progressive Conservative gain from Co-operative Commonwealth		Swing		+8.16
Source: Elections Ontario

1943 Ontario general election
Party	Candidate	Votes	%	±%
Co-operative Commonwealth	William Herbert Connor	6,739	34.35	+10.89
Progressive Conservative	Robert Ellsworth Elliott	5,660	28.85	+0.18
Liberal	John P. MacKay	4,821	24.58	–22.73
Labour	Peter Dunlop	2,058	10.49	–
Socialist-Labour	Charles Butters	339	1.73	+1.17
Total valid votes		19,617	99.05	
Total rejected ballots		189	0.95	–1.31
Turnout		19,806	61.51	–9.56
Eligible voters		32,200		
Co-operative Commonwealth gain from Liberal		Swing		+16.81
Source: Elections Ontario

1937 Ontario general election
Party	Candidate	Votes	%	±%
Liberal	John P. MacKay	9,796	47.31	–
Conservative	Orville M. Walsh	5,937	28.67	–9.16
Co-operative Commonwealth	Samuel Lawrence	4,858	23.46	–31.40
Socialist-Labour	Douglas J. Brunton	116	0.56	–0.29
Total valid votes		20,707	97.73	
Total rejected ballots		480	2.27	+0.47
Turnout		21,187	71.07	+3.44
Eligible voters		29,811		
Liberal gain from Co-operative Commonwealth		Swing		–
Source: Elections Ontario

1934 Ontario general election
Party	Candidate	Votes	%	±%
Co-operative Commonwealth	Samuel Lawrence	10,458	54.86	–
Conservative	William Robert Morrison	7,213	37.84	–24.81
Communist	David Arnott	815	4.28	+0.70
Independent	Albert V. Maskell	416	2.18	–
Socialist-Labour	Herbert C. Risley	162	0.85	–
Total valid votes		19,064	98.21	
Total rejected ballots		348	1.79	+0.11
Turnout		19,412	67.64	+14.44
Eligible voters		28,701		
Co-operative Commonwealth gain from Conservative		Swing		–
Source: Elections Ontario

1929 Ontario general election
Party	Candidate	Votes	%	±%
Conservative	William Robert Morrison	8,287	62.64	+10.74
Liberal	Russell Williams Treleaven	4,469	33.78	–
Communist	Stewart Osborne Smith	473	3.58	–
Total valid votes		13,229	98.31	
Total rejected ballots		227	1.69	+1.69
Turnout		13,456	53.20	–
Eligible voters		25,294		
Conservative hold		Swing		+5.37
Source: Elections Ontario

Ontario provincial by-election, June 27, 1928 Resignation of Leeming Carr to accept appointment as Sheriff of Wellington County
Party	Candidate	Votes	%	±%
Conservative	William Robert Morrison	2,677	51.90	–17.17
Unknown	Robert Gardner	1,487	28.83	–
Unknown	John Hodgson	994	19.27	–
Total valid votes		5,158	100.00	
Total rejected ballots		–		
Turnout		5,158	–	–
Eligible voters				
Conservative hold		Swing		–8.58
Source: Elections Ontario

1926 Ontario general election
Party	Candidate	Votes	%	±%
Conservative	Leeming Carr	10,174	69.07	+13.99
Liberal	William Nerritt Brandon	4,557	30.93	+5.39
Total valid votes		14,731	99.45	
Total rejected ballots		82	0.55	–1.15
Turnout		14,813	64.76	+23.44
Eligible voters		22,872		
Conservative hold		Swing		+9.69
Source: Elections Ontario

1923 Ontario general election
Party	Candidate	Votes	%	±%
Conservative	Leeming Carr	11,064	55.07	–
Liberal	Freeman Ferrier Treleaven	5,132	25.55	–
Labour	George Grant Halcrow	3,894	19.38	–40.85
Total valid votes		20,090	98.30	
Total rejected ballots		348	1.70	–2.91
Turnout		20,438	41.32	–29.84
Eligible voters		49,459		
Conservative gain from Labour		Swing		–
Source: Elections Ontario

1919 Ontario general election
Party	Candidate	Votes	%	±%
Labour	George Grant Halcrow	16,012	60.24	+4.07
Soldier–Labour	Samuel Levy Sanders	8,424	31.69	–
Soldier	Maurice Lionel Fitzgerald	2,146	8.07	–
Total valid votes		26,582	95.39	
Total rejected ballots		1,286	4.61	+3.49
Turnout		27,868	71.16	+7.34
Eligible voters		39,161		
Labour hold		Swing		+2.04
Source: Elections Ontario

1914 Ontario general election
Party	Candidate	Votes	%	±%
Labour	Allan Studholme	4,496	56.16	+0.83
Conservative	Thomas William Jutten	3,509	43.84	–0.83
Total valid votes		8,005	98.88	
Total rejected ballots		91	1.12	–0.58
Turnout		8,096	63.82	+0.17
Eligible voters		12,686		
Labour hold		Swing		+0.83
Source: Elections Ontario

1911 Ontario general election
Party	Candidate	Votes	%	±%
Labour	Allan Studholme	3,521	55.34	+14.42
Conservative	William Henry Cooper	2,842	44.66	+4.88
Total valid votes		6,363	98.30	
Total rejected ballots		110	1.70	–0.03
Turnout		6,473	63.65	–8.80
Eligible voters		10,170		
Labour hold		Swing		+4.77
Source: Elections Ontario

1908 Ontario general election
Party	Candidate	Votes	%	±%
Labour	Allan Studholme	2,717	40.91	–20.14
Conservative	John Jackson Scott	2,642	39.78	+0.84
Liberal	William Melville McClemont	1,258	18.94	–
Independent	William Lockhart Gordon	24	0.36	–
Total valid votes		6,641	98.27	
Total rejected ballots		117	1.73	+1.73
Turnout		6,758	72.45	–
Eligible voters		9,328		
Labour hold		Swing		–10.49
Source: Elections Ontario

Ontario provincial by-election, December 4, 1906 Death of Henry Carscallen
Party	Candidate	Votes	%	±%
Labour	Allan Studholme	2,356	61.05	–
Conservative	John J. Scott	1,503	38.95	–15.53
Total valid votes		3,859	100.00	
Total rejected ballots		–		
Turnout		3,859	–	–
Eligible voters				
Labour gain from Conservative		Swing		–
Source: Elections Ontario

1905 Ontario general election
Party	Candidate	Votes	%	±%
Conservative	Henry Carscallen	3,273	54.48	+6.63
Liberal	H. S. Griffin	2,735	45.52	+0.33
Total valid votes		6,008	99.45	
Total rejected ballots		33	0.55	–0.68
Turnout		6,041	79.39	+1.64
Eligible voters		7,609		
Conservative hold		Swing		+3.15
Source: Elections Ontario

1902 Ontario general election
Party	Candidate	Votes	%	±%
Conservative	Henry Carscallen	2,576	47.85	–9.99
Liberal	H. S. Griffin	2,433	45.19	+3.03
Socialist	William Lockhart Gordon	375	6.97	–
Total valid votes		5,384	98.77	
Total rejected ballots		67	1.23	+0.29
Turnout		5,451	77.75	–5.13
Eligible voters		7,011		
Conservative hold		Swing		–6.51
Source: Elections Ontario

1898 Ontario general election
Party	Candidate	Votes	%	±%
Conservative	Henry Carscallen	3,247	57.84	+8.93
Liberal	James Taylor Middleton	2,367	42.16	–8.93
Total valid votes		5,614	99.06	
Total rejected ballots		53	0.94	+0.07
Turnout		5,667	82.88	+4.87
Eligible voters		6,838		
Conservative gain from Liberal		Swing		+8.93
Source: Elections Ontario

1894 Ontario general election
Party	Candidate	Votes	%
Liberal	James Taylor Middleton	2,348	51.09
Conservative-Protestant Protective	C.R. Smith	2,248	48.91
Total valid votes		4,596	99.14
Total rejected ballots		40	0.86
Turnout		4,636	78.01
Eligible voters		5,943	
Liberal pickup new district.			
Source: Elections Ontario

== See also ==
- List of Ontario provincial electoral districts
- Canadian provincial electoral districts
