= Reg Gisborn =

Canadian politician (1912–1981)

Ontario MPP
- In office 1967–1975
- Preceded by: Norman Davison
- Succeeded by: Bob Mackenzie
- Constituency: Hamilton East
- In office 1955–1967
- Preceded by: New riding
- Succeeded by: Riding abolished
- Constituency: Wentworth East

Personal details
- Born: May 24, 1912 Hamilton, Ontario
- Died: January 30, 1981 (aged 68) Hamilton, Ontario
- Party: CCF/New Democrat
- Spouse: May
- Children: 1
- Occupation: Steelworker

Reginald Victor Gisborn (May 24, 1912 – January 30, 1981) was a politician in Ontario, Canada. He was a CCF and New Democrat member of the Legislative Assembly of Ontario from 1955 to 1975, representing the ridings of Wentworth East and Hamilton East in succession.

== Background ==
Gisborn was a steelworker by trade who served as president of Local 1005 of the United Steelworkers of America and as President of the Hamilton District Labour Council.

He died in 1981 after a long battle with cancer. He was survived by his wife, May, and one daughter.

== Politics ==
He represented the Hamilton, Ontario riding of Wentworth East from 1955 to 1967 and Hamilton East from 1967 to 1975. He was one of only three Ontario CCF MPPs elected in 1955. He joined the Ontario New Democratic Party when it was formed in 1961 through the merger of the CCF and the labour movement.

In 1960, Gisborn presented a bill to extend the provisions of the Fair Accommodations and Practices Act to extend to the rental and sale of homes in order to outlaw discrimination on the basis of race. He cited the case of a Windsor man who was denied the right to buy a house because he was black.

He retired in 1975, due to ill health.
