= Norman Davison =

Canadian politician (1907–1990)

Ontario MPP
- In office 1967–1975
- Preceded by: Ada Mary Pritchard
- Succeeded by: Mike Davison
- Constituency: Hamilton Centre
- In office 1959–1967
- Preceded by: Robert Ellsworth Elliott
- Succeeded by: Reg Gisborn
- Constituency: Hamilton East

Personal details
- Born: December 13, 1907 Everett, Ontario
- Died: June 28, 1990 (aged 82) Toronto, Ontario
- Party: CCF/New Democrat
- Spouse: Murla Vernice Lunn
- Children: 3
- Occupation: Machinist

Norman Andrew Davison (December 13, 1907 – June 28, 1990) was a politician in Ontario, Canada. He was a CCF and New Democrat member of the Legislative Assembly of Ontario from 1959 to 1975, representing the riding of Hamilton East and Hamilton Centre.

== Background ==
He was born in Everett, Ontario in 1907. He worked as a machinist. In 1933 he married Murla Vernice Lunn in Hamilton, Ontario. Together they raised three children, two daughters and a son. He died at the age of 82 in Toronto on June 28, 1990.

== Politics ==
He was elected as the Co-operative Commonwealth Federation MPP for Hamilton East in the 1959 Ontario election. He was re-elected in the 1963 provincial election for the Ontario New Democratic Party which had been formed through the merger of the CCF and the labour movement. In 1967, he was elected to the riding of Hamilton Centre, representing it for two terms before leaving the legislature at the 1975 provincial election when he retired. He was succeeded by his son, Mike Davison, who held the riding in the 1975 and 1977 elections.
