= 25th Parliament of Ontario =

Canadian provincial government 1955–1959

The 25th Legislative Assembly of Ontario was in session from June 9, 1955, until May 4, 1959, just prior to the 1959 general election. The majority party was the Ontario Progressive Conservative Party led by Leslie Frost.

Alfred Wallace Downer served as speaker for the assembly.

== Members elected to the Assembly ==
| Riding | Member | Party | First elected / previously elected | No. of terms | Notes |
|---|---|---|---|---|---|
| Algoma—Manitoulin | John Arthur Fullerton | Progressive Conservative | 1945 | 4th term | |
| Beaches | William Henry Collings | Progressive Conservative | 1951 | 2nd term | |
| Bellwoods | John Yaremko | Progressive Conservative | 1951 | 2nd term | |
| Bracondale | Arthur George Frost | Progressive Conservative | 1951 | 2nd term | |
| Brant County | Harry Corwin Nixon | Liberal | 1919 | 11th term | |
| Brantford | George Thomas Gordon | Liberal | 1948 | 3rd term | |
| Bruce | Ross MacKenzie Whicher | Liberal | 1955 | 1st term | |
| Carleton | William Erskine Johnston | Progressive Conservative | 1955 | 1st term | |
| Cochrane North | Philip Kelly | Progressive Conservative | 1951 | 2nd term | |
| Cochrane North | René Brunelle (1958) | Progressive Conservative | 1958 | 1st term | |
| Cochrane South | Wilf Spooner | Progressive Conservative | 1955 | 1st term | |
| Dovercourt | David Kerr | Progressive Conservative | 1951 | 2nd term | |
| Dufferin—Simcoe | Alfred Wallace Downer | Progressive Conservative | 1937 | 6th term | |
| Durham | John Weir Foote | Progressive Conservative | 1948 | 3rd term | |
| Eglinton | William James Dunlop | Progressive Conservative | 1951 | 2nd term | |
| Elgin | Fletcher Stewart Thomas | Progressive Conservative | 1945 | 4th term | |
| Elgin | Ronald Keith McNeil (1958) | Progressive Conservative | 1958 | 1st term | |
| Essex North | Arthur John Reaume | Liberal | 1951 | 2nd term | |
| Essex South | William Murdoch | Progressive Conservative | 1943 | 5th term | |
| Fort William | Clare Edgar Mapledoram | Progressive Conservative | 1951 | 2nd term | |
| Frontenac—Addington | David John Rankin | Progressive Conservative | 1955 | 1st term | |
| Glengarry | Osie Villeneuve (Note: Elected to federal seat.) | Progressive Conservative | 1948 | 3rd term | |
| Glengarry | Fernand Guindon (1957) | Progressive Conservative | 1957 | 1st term | |
| Grenville—Dundas | Frederick McIntosh Cass | Progressive Conservative | 1955 | 1st term | |
| Grey North | Mackinnon Phillips | Progressive Conservative | 1945 | 4th term | |
| Grey South | Farquhar Robert Oliver | Liberal | 1926 (Note: First elected as United Farmers) | 9th term | |
| Haldimand—Norfolk | James Noble Allan | Progressive Conservative | 1951 | 2nd term | |
| Halton | Stanley Leroy Hall | Progressive Conservative | 1943 | 5th term | |
| Hamilton Centre | William Kenneth Warrender | Progressive Conservative | 1951 | 2nd term | |
| Hamilton East | Robert Ellsworth Elliott | Progressive Conservative | 1945, 1951 | 3rd term* | |
| Hamilton—Wentworth | Thomas Ray Connell | Progressive Conservative | 1951 | 2nd term | |
| Hastings East | Roscoe Robson | Progressive Conservative | 1943 | 5th term | |
| Hastings East | Lloyd Harrison Price (1958) | Progressive Conservative | 1958 | 1st term | |
| Hastings West | Elmer Sandercock | Progressive Conservative | 1948 | 3rd term | |
| High Park | Alfred Hozack Cowling | Progressive Conservative | 1951 | 2nd term | |
| Huron | Thomas Pryde | Progressive Conservative | 1948 | 4th term | |
| Huron | Charles Steel MacNaughton (1958) | Progressive Conservative | 1958 | 1st term | |
| Huron—Bruce | John William Hanna | Progressive Conservative | 1943 | 5th term | |
| Kenora | Albert Wren | Liberal-Labour | 1951 | 2nd term | |
| Kent East | John Purvis Spence | Liberal | 1955 | 1st term | |
| Kent West | George William Parry | Progressive Conservative | 1945 | 4th term | |
| Kingston | William McAdam Nickle | Progressive Conservative | 1951 | 2nd term | |
| Lambton East | Charles Eusibius Janes | Progressive Conservative | 1945 | 4th term | |
| Lambton West | Bryan Lewis Cathcart | Progressive Conservative | 1945 | 4th term | |
| Lanark | George Henry Doucett | Progressive Conservative | 1937 | 6th term | |
| Lanark | John Arthur McCue (1957) | Progressive Conservative | 1957 | 1st term | |
| Lanark | George Ellis Gomme (1958) | Progressive Conservative | 1958 | 1st term | |
| Leeds | James Auld | Progressive Conservative | 1954 | 2nd term | |
| Lincoln | Charles Daley | Progressive Conservative | 1943 | 5th term | |
| London North | John Parmenter Robarts | Progressive Conservative | 1951 | 2nd term | |
| London South | George Ernest Jackson | Progressive Conservative | 1955 | 1st term | |
| Middlesex North | Thomas L. Patrick | Progressive Conservative | 1943 | 5th term | |
| Middlesex North | William Atcheson Stewart (1957) | Progressive Conservative | 1957 | 1st term | |
| Middlesex South | Harry Marshall Allen | Progressive Conservative | 1945 | 4th term | |
| Muskoka | Robert James Boyer | Progressive Conservative | 1955 | 1st term | |
| Niagara Falls | Arthur Connaught Jolley | Progressive Conservative | 1954 | 2nd term | |
| Nickel Belt | Rhéal Bélisle | Progressive Conservative | 1955 | 1st term | |
| Nipissing | Jean Marc Chaput | Progressive Conservative | 1954 | 2nd term | |
| Northumberland | William Arthur Goodfellow | Progressive Conservative | 1943 | 5th term | |
| Ontario | Matthew Bulloch Dymond | Progressive Conservative | 1955 | 1st term | |
| Oshawa | T.D. Thomas | Co-operative Commonwealth | 1948 | 3rd term | |
| Ottawa East | Jules Morin | Progressive Conservative | 1955 | 1st term | |
| Ottawa South | George Harrison Dunbar | Progressive Conservative | 1937 | 6th term | |
| Ottawa West | Donald Hugo Morrow | Progressive Conservative | 1948 | 3rd term | |
| Oxford | Gordon William Innes | Liberal | 1955 | 1st term | |
| Parkdale | William James Stewart | Progressive Conservative | 1938, 1951 | 5th term* | |
| Parry Sound | Allister Johnston | Progressive Conservative | 1948 | 3rd term | |
| Peel | Thomas Laird Kennedy | Progressive Conservative | 1919, 1937 | 10th term* | |
| Perth | James Frederick Edwards | Progressive Conservative | 1945 | 4th term | |
| Peterborough | Harold Robinson Scott | Progressive Conservative | 1943 | 5th term | |
| Port Arthur | George Calvin Wardrope | Progressive Conservative | 1951 | 2nd term | |
| Prescott | Louis-Pierre Cécile | Progressive Conservative | 1948 | 3rd term | |
| Prince Edward—Lennox | Norris Eldon Howe Whitney | Progressive Conservative | 1951 | 2nd term | |
| Rainy River | William George Noden | Progressive Conservative | 1951 | 2nd term | |
| Renfrew North | Stanley Joseph Hunt | Progressive Conservative | 1943 | 5th term | |
| Renfrew North | Maurice Hamilton (1958) | Progressive Conservative | 1958 | 1st term | |
| Renfrew South | James Shannon Dempsey (Note: Died in office, 1956.) | Independent PC | 1945 | 4th term | |
| Renfrew South | James Anthony Maloney (1956) | Progressive Conservative | 1956 | 1st term | |
| Riverdale | Robert William Macaulay | Progressive Conservative | 1951 | 2nd term | |
| Russell | Gordon Lavergne | Progressive Conservative | 1954 | 2nd term | |
| Sault Ste. Marie | Harry Lyons | Progressive Conservative | 1951 | 2nd term | |
| Simcoe Centre | George Graham Johnston | Progressive Conservative | 1943 | 5th term | |
| Simcoe East | Lloyd Averall Letherby | Progressive Conservative | 1954 | 2nd term | |
| St. Andrew | Allan Grossman | Progressive Conservative | 1955 | 1st term | |
| St. David | Henry James Price | Progressive Conservative | 1955 | 1st term | |
| St. George | Dana Harris Porter (Note: Appointed to Ontario Court of Appeal.) | Progressive Conservative | 1943 | 5th term | |
| St. George | Allan Frederick Lawrence (1958) | Progressive Conservative | 1958 | 1st term | |
| St. Patrick | Archibald Kelso Roberts | Progressive Conservative | 1943, 1951 | 4th term* | |
| Stormont | Peter Thomas Manley | Liberal | 1951 | 2nd term | |
| Sudbury | Gerald Joseph Monaghan | Progressive Conservative | 1955 | 1st term | |
| Timiskaming | Alexander Robert Herbert | Progressive Conservative | 1951 | 2nd term | |
| Victoria | Leslie Miscampbell Frost | Progressive Conservative | 1937 | 6th term | |
| Waterloo North | John Joseph Wintermeyer | Liberal | 1955 | 1st term | |
| Waterloo South | Raymond Munro Myers | Progressive Conservative | 1951 | 2nd term | |
| Welland | Ellis Price Morningstar | Progressive Conservative | 1951 | 2nd term | |
| Wellington South | Harry A. Worton | Liberal | 1955 | 1st term | |
| Wellington—Dufferin | John Henry Haines Root | Progressive Conservative | 1951 | 2nd term | |
| Wentworth | Arthur John Child | Progressive Conservative | 1951 | 2nd term | |
| Wentworth East | Reg Gisborn | Co-operative Commonwealth | 1955 | 1st term | |
| Windsor—Sandwich | William Griesinger | Progressive Conservative | 1945 | 4th term | |
| Windsor—Walkerville | M.C. Davies | Progressive Conservative | 1945 | 1st term | |
| Woodbine | Harold Ferguson Fishleigh | Progressive Conservative | 1951 | 2nd term | |
| York Centre | Thomas Graham | Progressive Conservative | 1955 | 1st term | |
| York East | Hollis Edward Beckett | Progressive Conservative | 1951 | 2nd term | |
| York North | Addison Alexander MacKenzie | Progressive Conservative | 1945 | 4th term | |
| York South | Donald Cameron MacDonald | Co-operative Commonwealth | 1955 | 1st term | |
| York West | W. Elmer Brandon | Progressive Conservative | 1951 | 2nd term | |
| York West | Leslie Rowntree (1956) | Progressive Conservative | 1956 | 1st term | |
| York—Humber | William Beverley Lewis | Progressive Conservative | 1955 | 1st term | |
| York—Scarborough | Richard Edward Sutton | Progressive Conservative | 1955 | 1st term | |

== Timeline ==
25th Legislative Assembly of Ontario - Movement in seats held (1955-1959)
| Party | 1955 | Gain/(loss) due to | | | | 1959 |
| Party | 1955 | Resignation as MPP | Death in office | Byelection gain | Byelection hold | 1959 |
|---|---|---|---|---|---|---|
| Progressive Conservative | 83 | (6) | (5) | 1 | 11 | 84 |
| Liberal | 10 | | | | | 10 |
| Co-operative Commonwealth | 3 | | | | | 3 |
| Liberal–Labour | 1 | | | | | 1 |
| Independent PC | 1 | | (1) | | | – |
| Total | 98 | (6) | (6) | 1 | 11 | 98 |

Changes in seats held (1955-1959)
| Seat | Before | | | | Change | | |
| Seat | Date | Member | Party | Reason | Date | Member | Party |
|---|---|---|---|---|---|---|---|
| Renfrew South | October 24, 1955 | James Shannon Dempsey | █ Independent PC | Died in office | January 12, 1956 | James Maloney | █ PC |
| York West | July 2, 1956 | Elmer Brandon | █ PC | Died in office | October 18, 1956 | Leslie Rowntree | █ PC |
| Middlesex North | January 10, 1957 | Thomas Patrick | █ PC | Died in office | September 5, 1957 | William Atcheson Stewart | █ PC |
| Glengarry | May 25, 1957 | Osie Villeneuve | █ PC | Resigned to contest the House of Commons seat of Glengarry—Prescott in the 1957 election | September 5, 1957 | Fernand Guindon | █ PC |
| Lanark | August 14, 1957 | George Henry Doucett | █ PC | Resigned to contest the House of Commons seat of Lanark in a byelection, upon the death of William Gourlay Blair | October 24, 1957 | John Arthur McCue | █ PC |
| Lanark | May 26, 1958 | John Arthur McCue | █ PC | Died in office | August 28, 1958 | George Gomme | █ PC |
| Elgin | November 9, 1957 | Fletcher Stewart Thomas | █ PC | Died in office | January 30, 1958 | Ron McNeil | █ PC |
| Huron | January 5, 1958 | Thomas Pryde | █ PC | Died in office | May 12, 1958 | Charles MacNaughton | █ PC |
| Cochrane North | January 22, 1958 | Philip Kelly | █ PC | Resigned from seat, after previously being ordered to resign as Minister of Mines | May 12, 1958 | René Brunelle | █ PC |
| St. George | January 30, 1958 | Dana Porter | █ PC | Appointed as Chief Justice of the Ontario Court of Appeal | May 12, 1958 | Allan Lawrence | █ PC |
| Renfrew North | March 1, 1958 | Stanley Joseph Hunt | █ PC | Resigned to contest the House of Commons seat of Renfrew North in the 1958 election | May 12, 1958 | Maurice Hamilton | █ PC |
| Hastings East | July 30, 1958 | Roscoe Robson | █ PC | Accepted an appointment as Sheriff of Hastings County | August 28, 1958 | Lloyd Price | █ PC |
