= 19th Parliament of Ontario =

The 19th Legislative Assembly of Ontario was in session from June 19, 1934, until August 25, 1937, just prior to the 1937 general election. The Ontario Liberal Party led by Mitchell Hepburn came to power with a majority government.

Norman Otto Hipel served as speaker for the assembly.

== Members of the Assembly ==
Riding	Member	Party	First elected / previously elected	No. of terms
Addington	William David Black	Conservative	1911	7th term
Algoma—Manitoulin	Wilfred Lynn Miller	Liberal	1934	1st term
Beaches	Thomas Alexander Murphy	Conservative	1926	3rd term
Bellwoods	Arthur Wentworth Roebuck	Liberal	1934	1st term
Bracondale	Arthur Russell Nesbitt	Conservative	1923	4th term
Brant	Harry Corwin Nixon	Liberal-Progressive	1919	5th term
Brantford	Morrison Mann MacBride	Independent	1919, 1934	3rd term*
Bruce	John William Sinclair	Liberal	1934	1st term
Carleton	Adam Holland Acres	Conservative	1923	4th term
Cochrane North	Joseph-Anaclet Habel	Liberal	1934	1st term
Cochrane South	John Rowlandson	Liberal	1934	1st term
Dovercourt	William Duckworth	Conservative	1934	1st term
Dufferin—Simcoe	Wilfred Davy Smith	Liberal	1934	1st term
Durham	William John Bragg	Liberal	1919	5th term
Eglinton	Harold James Kirby	Liberal	1934	1st term
Elgin	Mitchell Frederick Hepburn	Liberal	1934	1st term
Essex North	Adélard Charles Trottier	Liberal	1934	1st term
Essex South	Lambert Peter Wigle	Liberal	1914, 1934	2nd term*
Fort William	Joseph Edmund Crawford	Liberal	1934	1st term
Glengarry	James Alexander Sangster	Liberal	1923, 1929	3rd term*
Grenville—Dundas	George Holmes Challies	Conservative	1929	2nd term
Grey North	David James Taylor (Note: resigned seat to accept post)	Liberal-Progressive	1919	5th term
Grey North	Roland Patterson (1934)	Liberal-Progressive	1934	1st term
Grey South	Farquhar Robert Oliver	United Farmers	1926	3rd term
Haldimand—Norfolk	Richard Samuel Colter	Liberal	1934	1st term
Halton	Thomas Aston Blakelock	Liberal	1929	2nd term
Hamilton Centre	William Frederick Schwenger	Liberal	1934	1st term
Hamilton East	Samuel Lawrence	Co-operative Commonwealth	1934	1st term
Hamilton—Wentworth	Thomas Baker McQuesten	Liberal	1934	1st term
Hastings East	James Ferguson Hill	Conservative	1923	4th term
Hastings East	Harold Edward Welsh (1936)	Conservative	1936	1st term
Hastings West	James Albert Faulkner	Liberal	1934	1st term
High Park	William Alexander Baird	Conservative	1926	3rd term
Huron	James Simpson Ballantyne	Liberal	1934	1st term
Huron—Bruce	Charles Alexander Robertson	Liberal	1926	3rd term
Kenora	Earl Hutchinson (Note: died in 1934)	Labour	1929	2nd term
Kenora	Peter Heenan (1934)	Liberal	1919, 1934	3rd term*
Kent East	Douglas Munro Campbell	Liberal-Progressive	1934	2nd term
Kent West	Arthur St. Clair Gordon	Liberal	1934	1st term
Kingston	Thomas Ashmore Kidd	Conservative	1926	3rd term
Lambton East	Milton Duncan McVicar	Liberal	1934	1st term
Lambton West	William Guthrie	Liberal	1934	1st term
Lanark	John Alexander Craig	Conservative	1929	2nd term
Leeds	George Taylor Fulford	Liberal	1934	1st term
Lincoln	Frederick Harold Avery	Liberal	1934	1st term
London	Archibald Stuart Duncan	Liberal	1934	1st term
Middlesex North	John Willard Freeborn	Liberal	1919, 1934	3rd term*
Middlesex South	Charles Maitland MacFie	Liberal	1934	1st term
Muskoka—Ontario	James Francis Kelly	Liberal-Progressive	1934	1st term
Niagara Falls	William Houck	Liberal	1934	1st term
Nipissing	Théodore Legault (Note: died in 1935)	Liberal	1926, 1934	2nd term*
Nipissing	Joseph Marceau (1935)	Liberal	1919, 1935	2nd term*
Northumberland	Harold Norman Carr	Liberal	1934	1st term
Ontario	William Edmund Newton Sinclair	Liberal	1911, 1919	6th term*
Ottawa East	Marie Charles Denis Paul Leduc	Liberal	1934	1st term
Ottawa South	Arthur Ellis	Conservative	1929	2nd term
Oxford	Patrick Michael Dewan	Liberal	1934	1st term
Parkdale	William Herbert Price	Conservative	1914	6th term
Parry Sound	Milton Taylor Armstrong	Liberal	1934	1st term
Peel	Duncan McLean Marshall	Liberal	1934	1st term
Perth	William Angus Dickson	Liberal	1934	1st term
Peterborough	Thomas Percival Lancaster	Conservative	1929	2nd term
Port Arthur	Charles Winnans Cox	Liberal	1934	1st term
Prescott	Aurélien Bélanger	Liberal	1923, (Note: Russell) 1934	3rd term*
Prince Edward—Lennox	Thomas Gilmore Bowerman	Liberal	1934	1st term
Rainy River	Randolph George Croome	Liberal	1934	1st term
Renfrew North	John Courtland Bradley	Liberal	1934	1st term
Renfrew South	Thomas Patrick Murray	Liberal	1929	2nd term
Riverdale	Robert Allen	Liberal	1934	1st term
Russell	Arthur Desrosiers	Liberal	1934	1st term
Sault Ste. Marie	Augustus Roberts	Liberal	1934	1st term
Simcoe Centre	Leonard Jennett Simpson	Liberal	1929	2nd term
Simcoe East	Garnet Edward Tanner	Liberal	1934	1st term
St. Andrew	John Judah Glass	Liberal	1934	1st term
St. David	Wilfred Heighington	Conservative	1929	2nd term
St. George	Ian Thomas Strachan	Liberal	1934	1st term
St. Patrick	Frederick Fraser Hunter	Liberal	1934	1st term
Stormont	Fergus Beck Brownridge	Liberal	1934	1st term
Sudbury	Edmund Anthony Lapierre	Liberal	1934	1st term
Timiskaming	William Glennie Nixon	Liberal	1934	1st term
Victoria	William Newman	Liberal	1926	3rd term
Waterloo North	Nicholas Asmussen	Liberal	1919, 1934	2nd term*
Waterloo South	Norman Otto Hipel	Liberal	1930	2nd term
Welland	Edward James Anderson	Liberal	1934	1st term
Wellington North	George Alexander McQuibban	Liberal	1926	3rd term
Wellington South	Duncan Paul Munro	Liberal	1931	2nd term
Wellington South	James Harold King (1934)	Liberal	1934	1st term
Wentworth	George Henry Bethune	Liberal	1934	1st term
Windsor—Sandwich	James Howard Clark	Liberal	1934	1st term
Windsor—Walkerville	David Arnold Croll	Liberal	1934	1st term
Woodbine	Goldwin Corlett Elgie	Conservative	1934	1st term
York East	George Stewart Henry	Conservative	1913	7th term
York North	Morgan Baker	Liberal	1934	1st term
York South	Leopold Macaulay	Conservative	1926	3rd term
York West	William James Gardhouse	Liberal	1934	1st term

== Timeline ==
19th Legislative Assembly of Ontario - Movement in seats held (1934-1937)
Party	1934	Gain/(loss) due to				1937
Party	1934	Death in office	Resignation as MPP	Byelection gain	Byelection hold	1937
Liberal	65	(2)		1	2	66
Conservative	17	(1)			1	17
Liberal–Progressive	4		(1)		1	4
United Farmers	1					1
Co-operative Commonwealth	1					1
Labour	1		(1)			–
Independent	1					1
Vacant	–					–
Total	90	(3)	(2)	1	4	90

Changes in seats held (1934–1937)
Seat	Before				Change		
Seat	Date	Member	Party	Reason	Date	Member	Party
Wellington South	July 1, 1934	Duncan Paul Munro	█ Liberal	Died shortly after Election Day	August 20, 1934	James Harold King	█ Liberal
Kenora	July 12, 1934	Earl Hutchinson	█ Labour	Resigned to enable Heenan to return to Cabinet	August 7, 1934	Peter Heenan (Note: Returned by acclamation.)	█ Liberal
Grey North	July 17, 1934	David James Taylor	█ Lib-Progressive	Appointed Deputy Minister	August 20, 1934	Roland Patterson	█ Lib-Progressive
Nipissing	January 17, 1935	Théodore Legault	█ Liberal	Died in office	March 4, 1935	Joseph Marceau	█ Liberal
Hastings East	October 15, 1936	James Ferguson Hill	█ Conservative	Died in office	December 9, 1936	Harold Edward Welsh	█ Conservative
