= Edward Rathbun =

Edward Rathbun may refer to:

- Edward Walter Rathbun (1865–1940), business owner and politician in Ontario, Canada
- Edward Wilkes Rathbun (1842–1903), American-born entrepreneur and politician in Ontario, Canada
