= Roscoe Robson =

Canadian politician

Ontario MPP
- In office 1943–1958
- Preceded by: Harold Edward Welsh
- Succeeded by: Lloyd Harrison Price
- Constituency: Hastings East

Personal details
- Born: December 5, 1897 Moira, Ontario
- Died: April 1, 1964 (aged 66) Belleville, Ontario
- Party: Progressive Conservative
- Spouse: Eva May Hodgson
- Occupation: Farmer

Roscoe Lewis Robson (December 6, 1897 – April 1, 1964) was a politician in Ontario, Canada. He was a Progressive Conservative member of the Legislative Assembly of Ontario from 1943 to 1958 who represented the riding of Hastings East.

== Background ==
He was born in Moira, Ontario, the son of Lewis Robson, and educated in Belleville. For several years, he taught school. Robson served in World War I. In 1923, he married Eva May Hodgson. He died of a heart attack in 1964.

== Politics ==
Robson served as reeve for Thurlow Township from 1939 to 1942. He was elected to the provincial legislature in 1943 defeating Liberal candidate Edward Brown by 1,601 votes. He was re-elected in 1945, 1948, 1951 and 1955. In 1958 he resigned to accept an appointment as county sheriff. He served 15 years as a backbench supporter in the governments of George Drew, Thomas Kennedy, and Leslie Frost.
