= Amos Augustus Richardson =

Canadian politician from Ontario

Member of the Ontario Provincial Parliament for Hastings East
- In office June 8, 1908 – November 13, 1911
- Preceded by: Edward Walter Rathbun
- Succeeded by: Sandy Grant

Personal details
- Party: Conservative

Amos Augustus Richardson was a Canadian politician from Ontario. He represented Hastings East in the Legislative Assembly of Ontario from 1908 to 1911.

== See also ==
- 12th Parliament of Ontario
