= Hastings East (provincial electoral district) =

Ontario electoral district

Defunct provincial electoral district
- Legislature: Legislative Assembly of Ontario
- District created: 1867
- District abolished: 1966
- First contested: 1867
- Last contested: 1963

Hastings East was an electoral riding in Ontario, Canada. It was created in 1867 at the time of confederation. It was abolished in 1966 before the 1967 election.

== Members of Provincial Parliament ==
Hastings East
Assembly	Years	Member	Party
1st	1867–1871	Henry Corby	Conservative
2nd	1871–1874	Henry Corby	Conservative
3rd	1875–1879	Nathaniel Stephen Appleby (Note: Appleby sat as an Independent Conservative.)	Conservative
4th	1879–1883	Nathaniel Stephen Appleby	Conservative
5th	1883–1886	William Parker Hudson	Conservative
6th	1886–1890	William Parker Hudson	Conservative
7th	1890–1894	William Parker Hudson	Conservative
8th	1894–1898	Alexander McLaren (Note: McLaren sat as a Liberal-Patron member.)	Patrons of Industry
9th	1898–1902	Samuel Russell	Liberal
10th	1902–1904	Samuel Russell	Liberal
11th	1905–1908	Edward Walter Rathbun (Note: Rathbun sat as an Independent Liberal.)	Liberal
12th	1908–1911	Amos Augustus Richardson	Conservative
13th	1911–1914	Sandy Grant	Conservative
14th	1914–1919	Sandy Grant	Conservative
15th	1919–1923	Henry Ketcheson Denyes	United Farmers
16th	1923–1926	James Ferguson Hill	Conservative
17th	1926–1929	James Ferguson Hill	Conservative
18th	1929–1934	James Ferguson Hill	Conservative
19th	1934–1936	James Ferguson Hill	Conservative
19th	1936–1937	Harold Edward Welsh	Conservative
20th	1937–1943	Harold Edward Welsh	Conservative
21st	1943–1945	Roscoe Robson	Progressive Conservative
22nd	1945–1948	Roscoe Robson	Progressive Conservative
23rd	1948–1951	Roscoe Robson	Progressive Conservative
24th	1951–1955	Roscoe Robson	Progressive Conservative
25th	1955–1958	Roscoe Robson	Progressive Conservative
25th	1958–1959	Lloyd Harrison Price	Progressive Conservative
26th	1959–1963	Clarke Rollins	Progressive Conservative
27th	1963–1967	Clarke Rollins	Progressive Conservative
Sourced from the Ontario Legislative Assembly
Merged into Hastings riding before the 1967 election

== Election results ==
1963 Ontario general election
Party	Candidate	Votes	%	±%
Progressive Conservative	Clarke Rollins	7,815	64.37	+7.43
Liberal	Roy W. Sills	3,906	32.17	–7.12
New Democratic	Charles Clemens	419	3.45	–0.31
Total valid votes		12,140	98.94	
Total rejected ballots		130	1.06	–0.17
Turnout		12,270	70.93	+5.27
Eligible voters		17,299		
Progressive Conservative hold		Swing		+7.27
Source: Elections Ontario

1959 Ontario general election
Party	Candidate	Votes	%	±%
Progressive Conservative	Clarke Rollins	6,141	56.95	–
Liberal	J. Leslie McLaren	4,237	39.29	–
Co-operative Commonwealth	Charles A. Tupper	406	3.76	–
Total valid votes		10,784	98.77	
Total rejected ballots		134	1.23	–
Turnout		10,918	65.66	–
Eligible voters		16,629		
Progressive Conservative hold		Swing		–
Source: Elections Ontario

Ontario provincial by-election, 1958 Roscoe Robson appointed Sheriff
Party	Candidate	Votes
Progressive Conservative	Lloyd Price	acclaimed
Source: Elections Ontario

1955 Ontario general election
Party	Candidate	Votes	%	±%
Progressive Conservative	Roscoe Robson	5,999	60.47	+3.71
Liberal	Daniel Clarence McVicker	3,518	35.46	–1.47
Co-operative Commonwealth	Arthur Clyde Cole	403	4.06	–2.24
Total valid votes		9,920	99.06	
Total rejected ballots		94	0.94	+0.06
Turnout		10,014	66.70	–5.92
Eligible voters		15,013		
Progressive Conservative hold		Swing		+2.59
Source: Elections Ontario

1951 Ontario general election
Party	Candidate	Votes	%	±%
Progressive Conservative	Roscoe Robson	6,294	56.76	+2.62
Liberal	Donald M. Carruthers	4,096	36.94	+4.27
Co-operative Commonwealth	Arthur F. Whitehead	699	6.30	–6.89
Total valid votes		11,089	99.12	
Total rejected ballots		98	0.88	+0.09
Turnout		11,187	72.62	+8.93
Eligible voters		15,404		
Progressive Conservative hold		Swing		–0.83
Source: Elections Ontario

1948 Ontario general election
Party	Candidate	Votes	%	±%
Progressive Conservative	Roscoe Robson	5,163	54.14	–2.75
Liberal	George Jordon	3,115	32.67	–0.34
Co-operative Commonwealth	Edward Schlievert	1,258	13.19	+3.10
Total valid votes		9,536	99.21	
Total rejected ballots		76	0.79	+0.03
Turnout		9,612	63.69	–7.27
Eligible voters		15,092		
Progressive Conservative hold		Swing		–1.21
Source: Elections Ontario

1945 Ontario general election
Party	Candidate	Votes	%	±%
Progressive Conservative	Roscoe Robson	5,928	56.90	+5.34
Liberal	Archie A. Harvie	3,439	33.01	–3.09
Co-operative Commonwealth	George A. Logan	1,052	10.10	–2.26
Total valid votes		10,419	99.24	
Total rejected ballots		80	0.76	+0.03
Turnout		10,499	70.96	+6.17
Eligible voters		14,796		
Progressive Conservative hold		Swing		+4.21
Source: Elections Ontario

1943 Ontario general election
Party	Candidate	Votes	%	±%
Progressive Conservative	Roscoe Robson	4,715	51.55	–4.33
Liberal	F. Edward Brown	3,301	36.09	–8.03
Co-operative Commonwealth	John A. McAninch	1,130	12.36	–
Total valid votes		9,146	99.27	
Total rejected ballots		67	0.73	+0.22
Turnout		9,213	64.78	–19.29
Eligible voters		14,221		
Progressive Conservative hold		Swing		+1.85
Source: Elections Ontario

1937 Ontario general election
Party	Candidate	Votes	%	±%
Conservative	Harold Edward Welsh	7,052	55.88	+4.15
Liberal	F. Edward Brown	5,568	44.12	–4.15
Total valid votes		12,620	99.50	
Total rejected ballots		64	0.50	+0.50
Turnout		12,684	84.08	+5.73
Eligible voters		15,086		
Conservative hold		Swing		+4.15
Source: Elections Ontario

Ontario provincial by-election, December 9, 1934 Death of James Ferguson Hill
Party	Candidate	Votes	%	±%
Conservative	Harold Edward Welsh	7,118	54.34	–
Liberal	Harold A. Boyce	5,982	45.66	–
Total valid votes		13,100	100.00	
Total rejected ballots		–		
Turnout		–	–	–
Eligible voters		–		
Conservative hold		Swing		–
Source: Elections Ontario

1934 Ontario general election
Party	Candidate	Votes	%	±%
Conservative	James Ferguson Hill	6,257	51.73	–
Liberal	Peter McLaren	5,839	48.27	–
Total valid votes		12,096	100.00	
Total rejected ballots		–		
Turnout		12,096	78.35	–
Eligible voters		15,439		
Conservative hold		Swing		–
Source: Elections Ontario

1929 Ontario general election
Party	Candidate	Votes
Conservative	James Ferguson Hill	acclaimed
Source: Elections Ontario

1926 Ontario general election
Party	Candidate	Votes	%	±%
Conservative	James Ferguson Hill	3,983	62.68	+0.28
Prohibitionist	Wilberforce Gordon	2,371	37.32	–
Total valid votes		6,354	99.37	
Total rejected ballots		40	0.63	–0.17
Turnout		6,394	67.43	+3.33
Eligible voters		9,483		
Conservative hold		Swing		+0.14
Source: Elections Ontario

1923 Ontario general election
Party	Candidate	Votes	%	±%
Conservative	James Ferguson Hill	3,741	62.40	+13.63
United Farmers	Henry Ketcheson Denyes	2,254	37.60	–13.63
Total valid votes		5,995	99.21	
Total rejected ballots		48	0.79	–2.41
Turnout		6,043	64.10	–13.26
Eligible voters		9,428		
Conservative gain from United Farmers		Swing		+13.63
Source: Elections Ontario

1919 Ontario general election
Party	Candidate	Votes	%	±%
United Farmers	Henry Ketcheson Denyes	3,641	51.22	–
Conservative	Sandy Grant	3,467	48.78	–15.00
Total valid votes		7,108	96.80	
Total rejected ballots		235	3.20	+1.89
Turnout		7,343	77.36	–1.30
Eligible voters		9,492		
United Farmers gain from Conservative		Swing		–
Source: Elections Ontario

1914 Ontario general election
Party	Candidate	Votes	%	±%
Conservative	Sandy Grant	2,155	63.78	–
Liberal	John Alexander Holgate	1,224	36.22	–
Total valid votes		3,379	98.69	
Total rejected ballots		45	1.31	–
Turnout		3,424	78.66	–
Eligible voters		4,353		
Conservative hold		Swing		–
Source: Elections Ontario

1911 Ontario general election
Party	Candidate	Votes
Conservative	Sandy Grant	acclaimed
Source: Elections Ontario

1908 Ontario general election
Party	Candidate	Votes	%	±%
Conservative	Amos Augustus Richardson	2,201	61.76	+15.18
Liberal	Daniel Poucher	1,363	38.24	–
Total valid votes		3,564	99.61	
Total rejected ballots		14	0.39	–0.01
Turnout		3,578	75.90	–10.42
Eligible voters		4,714		
Conservative gain from Independent Liberal		Swing		+7.59
Source: Elections Ontario

1905 Ontario general election
Party	Candidate	Votes	%	±%
Independent Liberal	Edward Walter Rathbun	2,125	53.42	+2.96
Conservative	Amos Augustus Richardson	1,853	46.58	–2.96
Total valid votes		3,978	99.60	
Total rejected ballots		16	0.40	–0.84
Turnout		3,994	86.32	+3.63
Eligible voters		4,627		
Independent Liberal notional hold		Swing		+2.96
Source: Elections Ontario

1902 Ontario general election
Party	Candidate	Votes	%	±%
Liberal	Samuel Russell	1,962	50.46	–1.18
Conservative	Amos Augustus Richardson	1,926	49.54	+1.18
Total valid votes		3,888	98.76	
Total rejected ballots		49	1.24	+0.73
Turnout		3,937	82.69	–1.24
Eligible voters		4,761		
Liberal hold		Swing		–1.18
Source: Elections Ontario

1898 Ontario general election
Party	Candidate	Votes	%	±%
Liberal	Samuel Russell	2,011	51.64	+4.34
Conservative	J. Stokes	1,883	48.36	–
Total valid votes		3,894	99.49	
Total rejected ballots		20	0.51	+0.41
Turnout		3,914	83.94	+20.62
Eligible voters		4,663		
Liberal gain from Liberal-Patrons of Industry		Swing		+2.17
Source: Elections Ontario

1894 Ontario general election
Party	Candidate	Votes	%	±%
Liberal-Patrons of Industry	Alexander McLaren	1,574	52.70	–
Liberal	N. Vermilyea	1,413	47.30	–2.57
Total valid votes		2,987	99.90	
Total rejected ballots		3	0.10	+0.10
Turnout		2,990	63.32	–16.17
Eligible voters		4,722		
Liberal-Patrons of Industry gain from Conservative		Swing		+1.28
Source: Elections Ontario

1890 Ontario general election
Party	Candidate	Votes	%	±%
Conservative	William Parker Hudson	1,801	50.13	–1.41
Liberal	N. Vermilyea	1,792	49.87	+1.41
Total valid votes		3,593	100.00	
Total rejected ballots		–		
Turnout		3,593	79.49	–5.38
Eligible voters		4,520		
Conservative hold		Swing		–1.41
Source: Elections Ontario

1886 Ontario general election
Party	Candidate	Votes	%	±%
Conservative	William Parker Hudson	1,784	51.53	+0.14
Liberal	H. Ashley	1,678	48.47	–0.14
Total valid votes		3,462	99.20	
Total rejected ballots		28	0.80	+0.80
Turnout		3,490	84.87	+7.27
Eligible voters		4,112		
Conservative hold		Swing		+0.14
Source: Elections Ontario

1883 Ontario general election
Party	Candidate	Votes	%	±%
Conservative	William Parker Hudson	1,426	51.39	+2.91
Liberal	Nathaniel Stephen Appleby	1,349	48.61	–2.91
Total valid votes		2,775	100.00	
Total rejected ballots		–		
Turnout		2,775	77.60	+9.78
Eligible voters		3,576		
Conservative gain from Independent Conservative		Swing		+2.91
Source: Elections Ontario

1879 Ontario general election
Party	Candidate	Votes	%	±%
Independent Conservative	Nathaniel Stephen Appleby	1,204	51.52	−11.85
Conservative	Mr. Gordon	1,133	48.48	+11.85
Total valid votes		2,337	67.82	+9.62
Eligible voters		3,446		
Independent Conservative hold		Swing		−11.85
Source: Elections Ontario

1875 Ontario general election
Party	Candidate	Votes	%	±%
Independent Conservative	Nathaniel Stephen Appleby	1,064	63.37	
Conservative	B.S. Wilson	571	34.01	−54.56
Conservative	G.J. Potts	44	2.62	−85.95
Turnout		1,679	58.20	+48.10
Eligible voters		2,885		
Independent Conservative gain from Conservative		Swing		+27.28
Source: Elections Ontario

1871 Ontario general election
Party	Candidate	Votes	%	±%
Conservative	Henry Corby	186	88.57	+30.92
Liberal	Mr. Henderson	24	11.43	−30.92
Turnout		210	10.10	−65.11
Eligible voters		2,079		
Conservative hold		Swing		+30.92
Source: Elections Ontario

1867 Ontario general election
Party	Candidate	Votes	%
Conservative	Henry Corby	908	57.65
Liberal	Mr. Henderson	667	42.35
Total valid votes		1,575	75.21
Eligible voters		2,094	
Conservative pickup new district.			
Source: Elections Ontario
