= Harold Edward Welsh =

Canadian politician

Harold E. Welsh

Ontario MPP
- In office 1936–1943
- Preceded by: James Ferguson Hill
- Succeeded by: Roscoe Robson
- Constituency: Hastings East

Personal details
- Born: December 5, 1897; Moira, Ontario
- Died: April 1, 1964 (aged 66); Algonquin Park, Ontario
- Political party: Progressive Conservative
- Occupation: Physician

Harold Edward Welsh (May 5, 1896 – May 20, 1943) was a politician in Ontario, Canada. He was a Progressive Conservative member of the Legislative Assembly of Ontario from 1936 to 1943 who represented the eastern Ontario riding of Hastings East.

== Background ==
The son of William Frederick Welsh and Caroline Mabel Oatwater, he was born in Moira, Ontario and was educated at the University of Toronto. He worked as a country doctor, living in Roslin and also served as coroner for Hastings County and as medical officer of health for Huntingdon, Thurlow and Tyendinaga townships.

== Politics ==
Welsh was elected to the assembly in 1936, defeating Liberal candidate Dr. Harold A. Boyce in a bitterly contested by-election held following the death of James Ferguson Hill. Liberal amendments altering the distribution of school taxes between public and Roman Catholic schools were a crucial issue in the by-election. Welsh died in office; he drowned while fishing in Algonquin Provincial Park.
