= Samuel Russell (Canadian politician) =

Canadian politician

Ontario MPP
- In office 1898–1904
- Preceded by: Alexander McLaren
- Succeeded by: Edward Walter Rathbun
- Constituency: Hastings East

Personal details
- Born: January 29, 1848 Newcastle, New Brunswick
- Died: February 24, 1924 (aged 76) Belleville, Ontario
- Party: Independent-Liberal
- Spouse: Evelyn M. Davis
- Occupation: Clergyman, Newspaper editor, County registrar

Samuel Russell (January 29, 1848 – February 26, 1924) was a Presbyterian missionary, newspaper editor and politician in New Brunswick and Ontario, Canada. He represented Hastings East in the Legislative Assembly of Ontario from 1898 to 1904 as a Liberal.

The son of James Russell and Ann Carruthers, natives of Ireland, he was born in Newcastle, New Brunswick, and was educated there and at the University of New Brunswick. Russell went on to study theology at Queen's University and the University of Glasgow. In 1872, he began preaching in Red Bank and Black River. Russell was ordained in Newcastle in 1873 in the Maritime Synod of the Church of Scotland. He served as an Ordained Missionary at Red Bank and Black River until February 2, 1876. He moved to Montreal. From November 1878 to 1880, he returned to New Brunswick, serving as Ordained Missionary at the Scotch Colony at Kincardine, New Brunswick. Russell apparently subsequently left the ministry., returning to Kingston, Ontario, and completed a BA at Queen's in 1882.

He married Evelyn M. Davis. Russell later moved to her hometown of Deseronto, where he was editor of the Tribune.

While representing Hastings East as an MLA, he trice put forward legislation that would have allowed each municipality to decide for itself if it would use proportional representation in its elections.

He died in Belleville at the age of 76. At the time of his death, Russell was registrar for Hastings County, and is buried at Belleville Cemetery.
