= Sandy Grant (politician) =

Canadian politician from Ontario

Member of the Ontario Provincial Parliament for Hastings East
- In office December 11, 1911 – September 23, 1919
- Preceded by: Amos Augustus Richardson
- Succeeded by: Henry Ketcheson Denyes

Personal details
- Party: Conservative

Sandy Grant was a Canadian politician from Ontario. He represented Hastings East in the Legislative Assembly of Ontario from 1911 to 1919.

== See also ==
- 13th Parliament of Ontario
- 14th Parliament of Ontario
