= William Parker Hudson =

Canadian politician

Ontario MPP
- In office 1883–1894
- Preceded by: Nathaniel Stephen Appleby
- Succeeded by: Alexander McLaren
- Constituency: Hastings East

Personal details
- Born: February 13, 1841 Thurlow Township, Hastings County, Upper Canada
- Died: November 21, 1912 (aged 71) Belleville, Ontario
- Party: Conservative
- Spouse: Jane Fargay (m. 1866)
- Occupation: Blacksmith

William Parker Hudson (February 13, 1841 – November 21, 1912) was an Ontario businessman and political figure. He represented Hastings East in the Legislative Assembly of Ontario from 1883 to 1894 as a Conservative member.

He was born in Thurlow Township, Hastings County, Upper Canada in 1841, the son of Charles Hudson, a blacksmith. Hudson apprenticed with his father and went on to manufacture carriage. In 1866, he married Jane Fargay, the daughter of a local farmer. He served as treasurer and deputy reeve for the township. He died in 1912.
