= Henry Corby =

English-born Canadian baker, businessman, and politician (1806–1881)

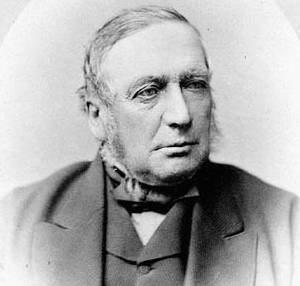

Ontario MPP
- In office 3 September 1867 – 23 December 1874
- Preceded by: Riding established
- Succeeded by: Nathaniel Stephen Appleby
- Constituency: Hastings East

9th Mayor of Belleville, Ontario
- In office 1867–1868
- Preceded by: Billa Flint
- Succeeded by: Peter deSidnia Conger

Personal details
- Born: 1806 Hanwell, England
- Died: 25 October 1881 (aged 74–75)
- Citizenship: Canada
- Party: Conservative
- Children: Henry Jr.
- Occupation: Baker; businessman; politician

Henry Corby (1806 – 25 October 1881) was an Ontario baker, businessman, and politician. Born and raised in England, Corby immigrated to Upper Canada in 1832. After building businesses in Belleville, Ontario, he served as the 9th mayor of Belleville from 1867 to 1868 and represented Hastings East in the Legislative Assembly of Ontario as a Conservative from 1867 to 1874.

== Life and career ==
Corby was born in Hanwell, England, in 1806. He was apprenticed to a baker in London.

In 1832, Corby married Alma Williams and moved to Belleville, then in Upper Canada, where he opened a general store and bakery, and secured a contract to supply the local militia.

On 24 December 1835, Alma and their three children drowned in the Bay of Quinte after the ice broke while the family were riding a sleigh.

In 1838, Corby became involved in shipping goods between Belleville and Kingston, and selling grain.

Corby served for a number of years on the Belleville village council and continued to be politically active as a Conservative. In 1855, he purchased a gristmill and foundeded his distillery in 1859.

In 1867, Corby was elected as the mayor of Belleville and an Ontario MPP representing Hastings East. He helped promote the development of railways in the area, which were a catalyst to increasing trade and residents. He left the office of mayor in 1868.

Corby retired from politics in 1875 due to declining health. He died on 25 October 1881. He was survived by his son, Henry Jr. (1851–1917).

== Legacy ==
The town where Corby's distillery was located was renamed as Corbyville in 1882, in his honour.

== Electoral history ==
1867 Ontario general election: Hastings East
Party	Candidate	Votes	%
Conservative	Henry Corby	908	57.65
Liberal	Mr. Henderson	667	42.35
Total valid votes		1,575	75.21
Eligible voters		2,094	
Conservative pickup new district.			
Source: Elections Ontario

1871 Ontario general election: Hastings East
Party	Candidate	Votes	%	±%
Conservative	Henry Corby	186	88.57	+30.92
Liberal	Mr. Henderson	24	11.43	−30.92
Turnout		210	10.10	−65.11
Eligible voters		2,079		
Conservative hold		Swing		+30.92
Source: Elections Ontario
