= Blain Morin =

Canadian politician

Ontario MPP
- In office 1998–1999
- Preceded by: Floyd Laughren
- Succeeded by: Shelley Martel
- Constituency: Nickel Belt

Personal details
- Born: September 30, 1960 (age 65)
- Party: New Democrat
- Occupation: Trade unionist

Blain Kevin Morin (born September 30, 1960) is a former politician in Ontario, Canada. He was a New Democratic member of the Legislative Assembly of Ontario from 1998 to 1999 who was elected in a by-election. He represented the riding of Nickel Belt in the Sudbury, Ontario, area.

== Background ==
Morin was president of the Canadian Union of Public Employees, Sudbury district. He subsequently worked for the Ontario Federation of Labour.

== Politics ==
Morin ran in a by-election to replace Floyd Laughren, who had retired in 1998. He was elected to the legislature in a by-election on October 1, 1998, defeating Progressive Conservative candidate Gerry Courtemanche by 1,364 votes.

In 1999, the provincial ridings of Nickel Belt and Sudbury East were merged for the 1999 provincial election; even during the by-election campaign, Morin was already indicating that he did not intend to compete against Sudbury East's popular incumbent Shelley Martel for the merged riding's nomination. There was some consideration that he might run for the NDP nomination in the neighbouring riding of Sudbury instead, but he did not do so.

=== Electoral record ===
Ontario provincial by-election, 1998, Nickel Belt
Party	Candidate	Votes	%	±%
New Democratic	Blain Morin	5,537	40.88	-5.66
Progressive Conservative	Gerry Courtemanche	4,173	30.81	+11.60
Liberal	Frank Madigan	3,836	28.32	-3.93
Total valid votes		13,546	100.00	

== After politics ==
After leaving the legislature in 1999, Morin went back to work for CUPE as a health and safety representative.
