= Lanark (provincial electoral district) =

Former provincial electoral district in Ontario, Canada

Lanark (1934–1987) Lanark-Renfrew (1987–1999)
Ontario electoral district

Defunct provincial electoral district
- Legislature: Legislative Assembly of Ontario
- District created: 1934
- District abolished: 1996
- First contested: 1934
- Last contested: 1995

Lanark was a provincial electoral district in Ontario, Canada, that was created for the 1934 election. In 1987 there was a minor redistribution and the riding was renamed to Lanark-Renfrew. It was abolished prior to the 1999 election. It was merged into the ridings of Renfrew—Nipissing—Pembroke and Lanark—Carleton.

== Boundaries ==
In 1933, in an austerity measure to mark the depression times, the province passed an update to the Representation Act that reduced the number of seats in the legislature from 112 to 90. The riding of Lanark was created from parts of Lanark North and Lanark South and consisted of the townships of Beckwith, Bathurst, Burgess North, Dalhousie, Darling, Drummond, Elmsley North, Lanark, Lavant, Montague, Pakenham, Ramsay, Sherbrooke North and Sherbrooke South. It also included the towns of Almonte, Carleton Place, Perth, and Smith's Falls and the village of Lanark.

== Members of Provincial Parliament ==
Lanark
Assembly	Years	Member	Party
Created in 1934 from Lanark North and Lanark South
19th	1934–1937	John Alexander Craig (Note: In 1938, the title of Member of the Legislative Assembly was officially changed to Member of Provincial Parliament. Previously, it was unofficially used in the media and in the Legislature.)	Conservative
20th	1937–1943	George Doucett	Progressive Conservative
21st	1943–1945	George Doucett	Progressive Conservative
22nd	1945–1948	George Doucett	Progressive Conservative
23rd	1948–1951	George Doucett	Progressive Conservative
24th	1951–1955	George Doucett	Progressive Conservative
25th	1955–1957	George Doucett	Progressive Conservative
25th	1957–1958	John Arthur McCue	Progressive Conservative
25th	1958–1971	George Gomme	Progressive Conservative
26th	1959–1963	George Gomme	Progressive Conservative
27th	1963–1967	George Gomme	Progressive Conservative
28th	1967–1971	George Gomme	Progressive Conservative
29th	1971–1975	Douglas Wiseman	Progressive Conservative
30th	1975–1977	Douglas Wiseman	Progressive Conservative
31st	1977–1981	Douglas Wiseman	Progressive Conservative
32nd	1981–1985	Douglas Wiseman	Progressive Conservative
33rd	1985–1987	Douglas Wiseman	Progressive Conservative
Riding renamed to Lanark—Renfrew
34th	1987–1990	Douglas Wiseman	Progressive Conservative
35th	1990–1995	Leo Jordan	Progressive Conservative
36th	1995–1999	Leo Jordan	Progressive Conservative
Sourced from the Ontario Legislative Assembly
Merged into Renfrew—Nipissing—Pembroke and Lanark—Carleton after 1996

== Election results ==
=== Lanark—Renfrew (1934–1987) ===
1995 Ontario general election: Lanark—Renfrew
Party	Candidate	Votes	%	±%
Progressive Conservative	Leo Jordan	19,959	55.79	+23.31
Liberal	June Timmons	9,956	27.83	–0.55
New Democratic	Don Page	3,455	9.66	–15.42
Confederation of Regions	Murray Reid	867	2.42	–6.20
Family Coalition	Kilian O'Donovan	745	2.08	–3.36
Independent	Mike Dubroy	557	1.56	–
Natural Law	Rick Alexander	237	0.66	–
Total valid votes		35,776	99.15	
Total rejected, unmarked and declined ballots		305	0.85	–0.35
Turnout		36,081	59.87	–0.51
Eligible voters		60,270		
Progressive Conservative hold		Swing		+11.93
Source: Elections Ontario

1990 Ontario general election: Lanark—Renfrew
Party	Candidate	Votes	%	±%
Progressive Conservative	Leo Jordan	11,063	32.48	–10.26
Liberal	Guin Persaud	9,665	28.38	–12.02
New Democratic	Harry W. Martin	8,541	25.08	+8.21
Confederation of Regions	Murray Reid	2,938	8.63	–
Family Coalition	Frank Foley	1,853	5.44	–
Total valid votes		34,060	98.80	
Total rejected, unmarked and declined ballots		413	1.20	+0.75
Turnout		34,473	60.37	–0.42
Eligible voters		57,102		
Progressive Conservative hold		Swing		+0.88
Source: Elections Ontario

1987 Ontario general election: Lanark—Renfrew
Party	Candidate	Votes	%	±%
Progressive Conservative	Douglas Wiseman	13,902	42.74	–13.65
Liberal	Bob Pugh	13,141	40.40	+13.82
New Democratic	Don Page	5,486	16.86	–0.17
Total valid votes		32,529	99.55	
Total rejected ballots		148	0.45	
Turnout		32,677	60.79	
Eligible voters		53,751		
Progressive Conservative notional hold		Swing		–13.74
Source: Elections Ontario

=== Lanark (1934–1987) ===
1985 Ontario general election
Party	Candidate	Votes	%	±%
Progressive Conservative	Douglas Wiseman	10,916	56.39	–5.30
Liberal	John A. Carley	5,146	26.58	+3.89
New Democratic	Don Page	3,297	17.03	+1.41
Total valid votes		19,359	99.53	
Total rejected ballots		92	0.47	+0.19
Turnout		19,451	56.28	+0.52
Eligible voters		34,564		
Progressive Conservative hold		Swing		–4.59
Source: Elections Ontario

1981 Ontario general election
Party	Candidate	Votes	%	±%
Progressive Conservative	Douglas Wiseman	10,502	61.69	+6.26
Liberal	Ray Matthey	3,864	22.70	+3.10
New Democratic	Cliff Bennett	2,659	15.62	–9.36
Total valid votes		17,025	99.71	
Total rejected ballots		49	0.29	+0.01
Turnout		17,074	55.76	–11.85
Eligible voters		30,622		
Progressive Conservative hold		Swing		+1.58
Source: Elections Ontario

1977 Ontario general election
Party	Candidate	Votes	%	±%
Progressive Conservative	Douglas Wiseman	11,086	55.42	–1.15
New Democratic	Bev Greenslade	4,997	24.98	+9.95
Liberal	Craig K. Steenburgh	3,919	19.59	–8.80
Total valid votes		20,002	99.73	
Total rejected ballots		55	0.27	–0.12
Turnout		20,057	67.60	–4.50
Eligible voters		29,668		
Progressive Conservative hold		Swing		–5.55
Source: Elections Ontario

1975 Ontario general election
Party	Candidate	Votes	%	±%
Progressive Conservative	Douglas Wiseman	11,641	56.58	–2.39
Liberal	Gary O'Neil	5,842	28.39	+0.90
New Democratic	George Murray	3,092	15.03	+1.49
Total valid votes		20,575	99.61	
Total rejected ballots		81	0.39	–0.22
Turnout		20,656	72.11	+2.90
Eligible voters		28,646		
Progressive Conservative hold		Swing		–1.64
Source: Elections Ontario

1971 Ontario general election
Party	Candidate	Votes	%	±%
Progressive Conservative	Douglas Wiseman	10,670	58.97	–11.17
Liberal	John Dunn	4,975	27.49	+4.43
New Democratic	James Ronson	2,450	13.54	+6.74
Total valid votes		18,095	99.39	
Total rejected ballots		111	0.61	+0.14
Turnout		18,206	69.20	+9.33
Eligible voters		26,308		
Progressive Conservative hold		Swing		–7.80
Source: Elections Ontario

1967 Ontario general election
Party	Candidate	Votes	%	±%
Progressive Conservative	George Gomme	9,505	70.14	–2.01
Liberal	Peter Hopkinson	3,126	23.07	+2.45
New Democratic	Axel Sjoberg	921	6.80	–0.45
Total valid votes		13,552	99.53	
Total rejected ballots		64	0.47	–0.31
Turnout		13,616	59.88	+5.69
Eligible voters		22,740		
Progressive Conservative hold		Swing		–2.23
Source: Elections Ontario

1963 Ontario general election
Party	Candidate	Votes	%	±%
Progressive Conservative	George Gomme	8,757	72.15	+9.90
Liberal	James L. Keenleyside	2,502	20.61	–17.14
New Democratic	James O. W. Griffith	879	7.24	–
Total valid votes		12,138	99.22	
Total rejected ballots		96	0.78	–0.09
Turnout		12,234	54.19	–10.07
Eligible voters		22,576		
Progressive Conservative hold		Swing		+13.52
Source: Elections Ontario

1959 Ontario general election
Party	Candidate	Votes	%	±%
Progressive Conservative	George Gomme	8,843	62.24	–
Liberal	R. Arthur Stewart	5,364	37.76	–
Total valid votes		14,207	99.13	
Total rejected ballots		125	0.87	–
Turnout		14,332	64.26	–
Eligible voters		22,303		
Progressive Conservative hold		Swing		–
Source: Elections Ontario

Ontario provincial by-election, August 28, 1958 Death of John Arthur McCue
Party	Candidate	Votes	%	±%
Progressive Conservative	George Gomme	acclaimed		
Source: Elections Ontario

Ontario provincial by-election, October 24, 1957 Resignation of George Doucett to enter federal politics
Party	Candidate	Votes	%	±%
Progressive Conservative	John Arthur McCue	9,212	78.97	+4.12
Liberal	E. S. Burchell	2,453	21.03	–4.12
Total valid votes		11,665	99.18	
Total rejected ballots		97	0.82	–0.13
Turnout		11,762	53.42	–15.49
Eligible voters		22,020		
Progressive Conservative hold		Swing		+4.12
Source: Elections Ontario

1955 Ontario general election
Party	Candidate	Votes	%	±%
Progressive Conservative	George Doucett	11,206	74.85	–2.71
Liberal	W. Peter Burchell	3,765	25.15	+6.12
Total valid votes		14,971	99.05	
Total rejected ballots		144	0.95	+0.94
Turnout		15,115	68.91	–0.71
Eligible voters		21,936		
Progressive Conservative hold		Swing		–4.41
Source: Elections Ontario

1951 Ontario general election
Party	Candidate	Votes	%	±%
Progressive Conservative	George Doucett	12,071	77.56	+12.13
Liberal	W. Peter Burchell	2,962	19.03	–8.23
Co-operative Commonwealth	Charles J. Gilhuly	531	3.41	–3.91
Total valid votes		15,564	99.99	
Total rejected ballots		2	0.01	–0.39
Turnout		15,566	69.62	+1.71
Eligible voters		22,359		
Progressive Conservative hold		Swing		+10.18
Source: Elections Ontario

1948 Ontario general election
Party	Candidate	Votes	%	±%
Progressive Conservative	George Doucett	10,077	65.43	–21.83
Liberal	William W. Pollock	4,198	27.26	–
Co-operative Commonwealth	Fred Cooke	1,127	7.32	–5.43
Total valid votes		15,402	99.59	
Total rejected ballots		63	0.41	–0.29
Turnout		15,465	67.91	+5.05
Eligible voters		22,774		
Progressive Conservative hold		Swing		–10.92
Source: Elections Ontario

1945 Ontario general election
Party	Candidate	Votes	%	±%
Progressive Conservative	George Doucett	12,483	87.26	+31.31
Co-operative Commonwealth	Douglas Ranshaw	1,823	12.74	–0.81
Total valid votes		14,306	99.31	
Total rejected ballots		100	0.69	+0.12
Turnout		14,406	62.86	+1.19
Eligible voters		22,918		
Progressive Conservative hold		Swing		+16.06
Source: Elections Ontario

1943 Ontario general election
Party	Candidate	Votes	%	±%
Progressive Conservative	George Doucett	7,126	55.95	+1.59
Liberal	Fred W. Burchell	3,884	30.50	–15.14
Co-operative Commonwealth	Laurie A. Hetanen	1,726	13.55	–
Total valid votes		12,736	99.43	
Total rejected ballots		73	0.57	+0.05
Turnout		12,809	61.66	–12.56
Eligible voters		20,772		
Progressive Conservative hold		Swing		+8.36
Source: Elections Ontario

1937 Ontario general election
Party	Candidate	Votes	%	±%
Conservative	George Doucett	9,103	54.37	+2.09
Liberal	Donald C. Smith	7,641	45.63	–2.09
Total valid votes		16,744	99.48	
Total rejected ballots		87	0.52	+0.04
Turnout		16,831	74.22	+1.03
Eligible voters		22,676		
Conservative hold		Swing		+2.09
Source: Elections Ontario

1934 Ontario general election
Party	Candidate	Votes	%
Conservative	John Alexander Craig	8,468	52.27
Liberal	Albert Ernest Lyon	7,731	47.73
Total valid votes		16,199	99.53
Total rejected ballots		77	0.47
Turnout		16,276	73.20
Eligible voters		22,236	
Conservative pickup new district.			
Source: Elections Ontario

== See also ==
- List of Ontario provincial electoral districts
- Canadian provincial electoral districts
