= Floyd Laughren =

Canadian politician

The Honourable Floyd Laughren ECO

4th Deputy Premier of Ontario
- In office October 1, 1990 – June 26, 1995
- Premier: Bob Rae
- Preceded by: Robert Nixon
- Succeeded by: Ernie Eves

Ontario MPP
- In office 1971–1998
- Preceded by: Gaston Demers
- Succeeded by: Blain Morin
- Constituency: Nickel Belt

Personal details
- Born: October 3, 1935 (age 90) Shawville, Quebec, Canada
- Party: Ontario New Democrat
- Spouse: Jeanette Gossen (d. 2007)
- Children: 3
- Occupation: Economist, college professor

Floyd Laughren ECO (born October 3, 1935) is a former Canadian politician in Ontario, Canada. He was a New Democratic member of the Legislative Assembly of Ontario from 1971 to 1998 who represented the northern Ontario riding of Nickel Belt. He served in cabinet as Finance Minister and Deputy Premier in the government of Bob Rae.

== Background ==
Laughren was born in Shawville, Quebec to parents Irvin and Erma Laughren. He is one of eight children. The family moved to a farm near Caledonia, Ontario where he grew up. He studied business at Ryerson Polytechnical Institute and York University. After graduation, he worked as a manager at a Zellers store. In 1969 he was hired to teach economics at Cambrian College in Sudbury.

Laughren's wife Jeanette (née Gossen), whom he married in 1962, died on August 26, 2007. They had three children.

== Politics ==
In the 1971 provincial election Laughren ran as the New Democratic Party candidate in the Sudbury-area riding of Nickel Belt. He defeated Progressive Conservative incumbent Gaston Demers by just under 2,000 votes. He was re-elected without difficulty in the elections of 1975, 1977, 1981, 1985, 1987 and 1990.

Laughren was from the left wing of the party, and supported Richard Johnston for the party's leadership in 1982. He was not initially an ally of Bob Rae, and was also a frequent rival of fellow Northern Ontario Member of Provincial Parliament (MPP) Bud Wildman for key shadow cabinet postings. Some of the official critic postings that he held included Colleges and Universities, Treasurer, and Natural Resources.

According to journalist Thomas Walkom, Laughren was planning to retire from politics before the 1990 campaign, and only ran again because the election was called before he could coordinate his departure. The NDP won a majority government and Laughren was sworn in as Finance Minister and Deputy Premier on October 1, 1990.

As Finance Minister, Laughren was frequently criticized for presiding over a series of budget deficits (his 1991 budget proclaimed a deficit of almost ten billion dollars) without significant job creation. Laughren's defenders have noted that much of North America was mired in a significant recession during this period, and that the outgoing Liberal government of David Peterson significantly underestimated expenditure costs in 1990. It has also been noted that Laughren's budgets after 1991 were generally focused on deficit-cutting measures.

Despite his previous reputation for being on the left wing of the party, Laughren emerged as a proponent of austerity measures and generally centrist policies during his time in government. He also became known as Bob Rae's closest ally in cabinet, notwithstanding their previous differences. Along with Rae, he supported the party's withdrawal from an earlier pledge to introduce public automobile insurance in the province in 1991. He also approved the introduction of casinos to the province, and was a leading proponent of the Social Contract in 1993.

As the province's first socialist Finance Minister, Laughren was nicknamed "Pink Slip Floyd" by the right-wing Sun Media tabloid newspapers and public sector unions OPSEU and CUPE alike. When Liberal Robert Nixon retired from the legislature in 1992, Laughren became its longest-serving member.

The NDP government was defeated in the 1995 provincial election, although Laughren was able to retain Nickel Belt with a somewhat reduced majority. In 1996, he was the only New Democratic MPP from northern Ontario to support Frances Lankin's unsuccessful bid to replace Rae as party leader.

=== Cabinet positions ===
Rae ministry, Province of Ontario (1990–1995)
Cabinet posts (3)
Predecessor	Office	Successor
Ministry Created	Minister of Finance; 1993–1995	Ernie Eves
Robert Nixon	Minister of Economics and Treasurer; 1990–1993	Ministry Abolished
Robert Nixon	Deputy Premier of Ontario; 1990–1995	Ernie Eves

== Later life ==
He retired in 1998 and was appointed as chair the Ontario Energy Board. He served a three-year term. In 2001, Laughren was appointed to the Board of Governors for Laurentian University. In 2010, he was made Chair of the Board. In 2000, he received an honorary Doctor of Laws degree from that institution.

In 2006, he was appointed by Greater Sudbury mayor David Courtemanche to chair an advisory committee to review and recommend improvements to city services in the five-year-old amalgamated city. Laughren offered 34 recommendations for service improvements when he presented his final report on January 10, 2007.

In 2012, Laughren was appointed to a three-member panel along with Murray Elston and David McFadden to study Ontario's electricity distribution system. They released a report that recommended the 73 power distribution utilities be reduced to between 8 and 12 with at least 400,000 customers in each of the new utilities. In 2017, he was made a member of the Order of Ontario.
