= Elmer Buchanan =

Canadian politician

The Honourable Elmer Buchanan ECO

Ontario MPP
- In office 1990–1995
- Preceded by: Jim Pollock
- Succeeded by: Harry Danford
- Constituency: Hastings—Peterborough

Personal details
- Born: 1946 (age 79–80) Havelock, Ontario, Canada
- Party: New Democrat (1990-2006); Liberal (2006-)
- Occupation: High-school teacher, treasurer

Elmer Buchanan (born c. 1946) is a former politician in Ontario, Canada. He was a New Democratic member of the Legislative Assembly of Ontario from 1990 to 1995 who represented the eastern Ontario riding of Hastings—Peterborough. He was a cabinet minister in the government of Bob Rae. Buchanan left the NDP to support Bob Rae's 2006 Liberal party leadership bid.

== Background ==
Buchanan was born in Havelock, Ontario and raised on a farm in Belmont Township where his family has lived since 1834. Buchanan studied at Queen's University where he graduated with a Bachelor of Arts degree, and also has a certificate from Teacher's College in Peterborough County. He worked as a high-school teacher in Hastings County, and was vice-principal of North Hastings High School for four years.

== Politics ==
Buchanan helped form the NDP association in Hastings in 1972. From 1975 to 1987 he campaigned for provincial office five times before his election in 1990.

The NDP won a majority government under Bob Rae in the provincial election of 1990, and Buchanan defeated Jim Pollock by 896 votes. He was named Minister of Agriculture and Food on October 1, 1990, and held this position for the entirety of the Rae government. (Note: Ministry was renamed as Ministry of Agriculture, Food and Rural Affairs in 1994. Buchanan continued in this expanded role until 1995.)

Buchanan was one of the most successful ministers in the Rae government, and was widely praised for his handling of the agriculture portfolio. Premier Bob Rae said that he was "a constant source of sound advice, political savvy and practical intelligence." While the Ontario NDP lost much of its rural support between 1990 and 1995, Buchanan remained personally popular within rural Ontario and with the agricultural community.

Buchanan stabilized funding to many rural centres in 1994, and was a supporter of fuel ethanol throughout his time in government. He also promoted a rural investment pool, and extended unionization rights to farm workers while ensuring that farms with fifty or fewer employees would not be affected.

The NDP was defeated in the provincial election of 1995, and Buchanan's personal popularity was not enough to save him from the party's loss of support in rural areas. He lost to Progressive Conservative Harry Danford by almost 8,000 votes, amid a provincial majority for the Progressive Conservative Party.

Despite some cutbacks during Ontario's recession of the early 1990s, the agriculture ministry had a budget of about $600 million in 1994 and kept an agricultural representative in each of the 52 county offices. By 2000, under the government of Mike Harris, the budget had been cut to $300 million and the local representatives had been eliminated.

=== Cabinet positions ===
Rae ministry, Province of Ontario (1990–1995)
Cabinet post (1)
| Predecessor | Office | Successor |
|---|---|---|
| David Ramsay | Minister of Agriculture and Food; 1990-1995 | Noble Villeneuve |

== Later life ==
Buchanan initially considered running for the leadership of the NDP in 1996, but declined. He was instead elected as treasurer of the Ontario NDP, and set tough targets for eliminating the party's post-1995 debt. He also served as a vice-president on the party's executive, and became a board member of the Children's Aid Society.

In early 2005, he assisted the NDP's by-election campaign in the rural riding of Dufferin—Peel—Wellington—Grey. However, since his endorsement of Bob Rae's bid for the leadership of the Liberal Party, he has severed his ties to the NDP.

In 2008, Buchanan was named Acting Chair of the Ontario Farm Products Marketing Commission.

On October 11, 2013 Buchanan was appointed Board Chair of the Ontario Racing Commission.
