= Nathaniel Stephen Appleby =

Canadian politician

Ontario MPP
- In office 1875–1883
- Preceded by: Henry Corby
- Succeeded by: William Parker Hudson
- Constituency: Hastings East

Personal details
- Born: 1811 Tyendinaga, Upper Canada
- Died: 1890 (aged 78–79) San Francisco, California
- Party: Independent-Conservative
- Spouse: Sarah Maria Lewis
- Occupation: Businessman

Nathaniel Stephen Appleby (1820–1890) was an Ontario businessman and political figure. He represented Hastings East in the Legislative Assembly of Ontario as an independent Conservative from 1875 to 1883.

He was born in Tyendinaga, Upper Canada in 1820, the son of Thomas Dorland Appleby, and educated in Belleville, Ontario. He operated flour mills near Shannonville, Ontario. In 1842, he married Sarah Maria Lewis. Appleby was reeve for Tyendinaga Township from 1851 to 1870 and warden for Hastings County from 1858 to 1862. He also served as justice of the peace. He was defeated by William Parker Hudson for the Hastings East seat in 1883.

== Electoral history ==
1875 Ontario general election: Hastings East
Party	Candidate	Votes	%	±%
Independent Conservative	Nathaniel Stephen Appleby	1,064	63.37	
Conservative	B.S. Wilson	571	34.01	−54.56
Conservative	G.J. Potts	44	2.62	−85.95
Turnout		1,679	58.20	+48.10
Eligible voters		2,885		
Independent Conservative gain from Conservative		Swing		+27.28
Source: Elections Ontario

1879 Ontario general election: Hastings East
Party	Candidate	Votes	%	±%
Independent Conservative	Nathaniel Stephen Appleby	1,204	51.52	−11.85
Conservative	Mr. Gordon	1,133	48.48	+11.85
Total valid votes		2,337	67.82	+9.62
Eligible voters		3,446		
Independent Conservative hold		Swing		−11.85
Source: Elections Ontario
