= Henry Ketcheson Denyes =

Canadian politician from Ontario

Member of the Ontario Provincial Parliament for Hastings East
- In office October 20, 1919 – May 10, 1923
- Preceded by: Sandy Grant
- Succeeded by: James Ferguson Hill

Personal details
- Party: United Farmers

Henry Ketcheson Denyes was a Canadian politician from Ontario. He represented Hastings East in the Legislative Assembly of Ontario from 1919 to 1923.

== See also ==
- 15th Parliament of Ontario
