= George McCague =

Canadian politician

Ontario MPP
- In office 1987–1990
- Preceded by: New riding
- Succeeded by: Jim Wilson
- Constituency: Simcoe West
- In office 1975–1987
- Preceded by: Wally Downer
- Succeeded by: Riding abolished
- Constituency: Dufferin—Simcoe

Personal details
- Born: December 5, 1929 Essa Township, Ontario
- Died: July 14, 2014 (aged 84) Alliston, Ontario
- Party: Progressive Conservative
- Spouse: Brigitte McCague
- Occupation: Farmer

George Raymond McCague (December 5, 1929 – July 14, 2014) was a Canadian politician in Ontario. He was a Progressive Conservative member in the Legislative Assembly of Ontario from 1975 to 1990, and was a cabinet minister in the governments of Bill Davis and Frank Miller.

== Background ==
McCague was born in Essa Township, north of Alliston, Ontario. He was son of J. J. E. McCague, who owned Glenafton Farms which was one of the best known dairy farms of its time. He was educated at Burns Public School, Alliston High School (both schools since closed) and the Ontario Agricultural College in Guelph, Ontario. He worked as a sod and potato farmer and executive and owned a real estate company in Alliston.

== Politics ==
McCague was a councillor in Alliston from 1960 to 1961, deputy reeve from 1962 to 1964, reeve from 1965 to 1966, a public school board member from 1967 to 1968 and Mayor from 1969 to 1973. He was chair of the Board of Governors for Georgian College from 1967 to 1974 and Simcoe County warden in 1966. He also served as chair of the Niagara Escarpment Commission in the early 1970s.

He was elected to the Ontario legislature in the 1975 provincial election, after defeating long serving Dufferin Simcoe MP Wally Downer for the Progressive Conservative nomination. He defeated Liberal Bob Beattie by 1,691 votes in the riding of Dufferin—Simcoe. He was elected by greater margins in the elections of 1977, 1981, and 1985.

McCague served as parliamentary assistant to the Treasurer just before the 1977 election, and was brought into Bill Davis's cabinet on September 21, 1977, as Minister of Government Services. On January 21, 1978, he was shifted to the Ministry of the Environment. He was named Chair of the Management Board of Cabinet on August 18, 1978. He retained this position until Davis resigned as Premier in 1985. McCague tried to convince Davis to remain in office for another election, but afterwards endorsed Frank Miller to succeed him as party leader.

When Miller replaced Davis as Premier on February 8, 1985, he appointed McCague as Minister of Transportation and Communications. Soon after this, the Tories were reduced to a tenuous minority government in the 1985 election under Miller's leadership. McCague was retained in his portfolio after the election, but did little of significance before the government was defeated in the house. He sat in opposition for the remainder of his time in the legislature.

McCague was narrowly re-elected in the 1987 election, defeating Liberal candidate Gary Johnson by only 306 votes in the redistributed constituency of Simcoe West. He did not seek re-election in 1990. He returned to municipal politics, and served as mayor of Tecumseth from 1992 to 1994.

McCague is considered a mentor to his successor in the legislature, former cabinet minister Jim Wilson. He continued to support the federal Progressive Conservative Party over the Reform Party in the 1990s. After leaving provincial politics, McCague served as the mayor of the newly amalgamated town of New Tecumseth from 1992 to 1994.

Shortly after Mike Harris returned the Progressive Conservatives to government in 1995, McCague was appointed as a government negotiator in talks with the Ontario Medical Association. He was a founding member, and first chair, of the Board Governors of Georgian College, in Barrie.

=== Cabinet positions ===
Miller ministry, Province of Ontario (1985)
Cabinet post (1)
Predecessor	Office	Successor
James Snow	Minister of Transportation and Communications; 1985 (Feb–June)	Ed Fulton
Davis ministry, Province of Ontario (1971–1985)
Cabinet posts (3)
Predecessor	Office	Successor
James Auld	Chair of the Management Board of Cabinet; 1978–1985	Bette Stephenson
George Kerr	Minister of Environment; 1978 (January–August)	Harry Parrott
John Smith	Minister of Government Services; 1977–1978	Lorne Henderson
