= Gaston Demers =

Canadian politician (1935–2004)

Ontario MPP
- In office 1963–1971
- Preceded by: Rhéal Bélisle
- Succeeded by: Floyd Laughren
- Constituency: Nickel Belt

Personal details
- Born: November 23, 1935
- Died: February 7, 2004 (aged 68) Sudbury, Ontario, Canada
- Party: Progressive Conservative
- Spouse: Doreen nee McDonald Demers
- Children: Lisa Renee Demers and Lianne Carmel Demers
- Occupation: Stock broker, real estate investor

Gaston Joseph Clément Demers (November 23, 1935 – February 7, 2004) was a politician in Ontario, Canada. He was a Progressive Conservative member of the Legislative Assembly of Ontario from 1963 to 1971 who represented the northern Ontario riding of Nickel Belt.

Before entering politics, Demers had worked as a journalist for the North Bay Nugget and as a town clerk in Chelmsford.

After leaving politics, he served on the boards of FedNor and of Sudbury's Laurentian Hospital, and was a key lobbyist behind the creation of Collège Boréal.
