= Lloyd Price (politician) =

Canadian politician from Ontario (1920–2007)

Member of the Ontario Provincial Parliament for Hastings East
- In office August 28, 1958 – June 10, 1959
- Preceded by: Roscoe Robson
- Succeeded by: Clarke Rollins

Personal details
- Party: Progressive Conservative

Lloyd Harrison Price (April 12, 1920 – May 1, 2007) was a Progressive Conservative Party of Ontario member of the Legislative Assembly of Ontario from 1958 to 1959. He was the party's candidate in a by-election in Hastings East. The by-election had been scheduled for September 11, 1958 but was acclaimed on August 28, 1959, when the nomination deadline in the Conservative stronghold passed without any other candidates registering. Price owned a service station and restaurant in Actinolite, Ontario and was 38-years old at the time of his election. Several months later, on April 23, 1959, Price was challenged and defeated for the Progressive Conservative nomination for the 1959 Ontario provincial election by Clarke Rollins, a distributor for an oil company who was involved in local politics having been warden for Hastings county.

== See also ==
- 25th Parliament of Ontario
