= Douglas Wiseman =

Canadian politician (1930–2020)

Ontario MPP
- In office 1987–1990
- Preceded by: New riding
- Succeeded by: Leo Jordan
- Constituency: Lanark—Renfrew
- In office 1971–1987
- Preceded by: George Gomme
- Succeeded by: Riding abolished
- Constituency: Lanark

Personal details
- Born: July 21, 1930; Smiths Falls, Ontario, Canada
- Died: August 1, 2020 (aged 91); Perth, Ontario, Canada
- Political party: Progressive Conservative
- Occupation: Businessman, farmer
- Portfolio: Minister without portfolio, 1978-79

Douglas Jack Wiseman (July 21, 1930 – August 1, 2020) was a politician in Ontario, Canada. He served in the Legislative Assembly of Ontario as a Progressive Conservative from 1971 to 1990, and was a cabinet minister in the government of Bill Davis.

== Background ==
Wiseman was educated at Smiths Falls College, and worked as a farmer and small businessman. He developed a prominent cow-calf business in the region, and later opened a chain of discount shoe stores. Wiseman was also a public school board chair, and a trustee of St. Paul's United Church in Perth, Ontario. He died at a hospital in Perth in 2020 at the age of 90.

== Politics ==
He was elected to the Ontario legislature in the 1971 provincial election, gaining an easy victory in the eastern Ontario constituency of Lanark. He was returned in the 1975 election, and was named parliamentary assistant to the Minister of Health on November 19, 1975.

Wiseman was appointed as a minister without portfolio in Davis's government on January 21, 1978. On August 30, 1979, he was promoted to Minister of Government Services. On July 6, 1983 Wiseman was dropped from cabinet. Davis gave no particular reason for dropping Wiseman other than to say he needed to make space for "new blood". There was some speculation that Wiseman's removal was a result of a dispute with one of Davis's favourite deputy ministers, Alan Gordon. Wiseman alleged that Gordon had awarded six figure government contracts without tender or permission.

Wiseman who was upset at the demotion, went so far as to criticize his own party in the house. On May 1, 1984, he accused Solicitor-General George Taylor of forcing the OPP to purchase a pair of new boats from a supplier in Penetanguishene, Ontario which was in Taylor's own riding. The lowest bidder was a company based in Wiseman's riding. Wiseman was accused of retaliation for his removal from cabinet. Wiseman denied this, saying he was only looking out for his constituents. He said, "You have to do what you think is right for your constituents... From time to time you have to take a stand for your people... If you're going to be a jelly fish and hide behind a chair, you shouldn't be in politics." In the fall of 1984, Davis, partly to ameliorate the situation, appointed Wiseman to a government commission promoting the sale of agricultural products to the Americans.

The Progressive Conservatives, who had governed the province continually since 1943, lost power following the 1985 election but Wiseman was re-elected without difficulty. He faced a close challenge from Liberal Bob Pugh in the 1987 campaign in the newly reconfigured riding of Lanark—Renfrew. Wiseman won by 761 votes. He held no Critic portfolios in the legislature, and did not seek re-election in 1990.

=== Cabinet positions ===
Ontario provincial government of Bill Davis
Cabinet post (1)
Predecessor	Office	Successor
Lorne Henderson	Minister of Government Services; 1979–1983	George Ashe
