= Nickel Belt (provincial electoral district) =

Provincial electoral district in Ontario, Canada

Coordinates: 46.96°N 81.51°W

Ontario electoral district
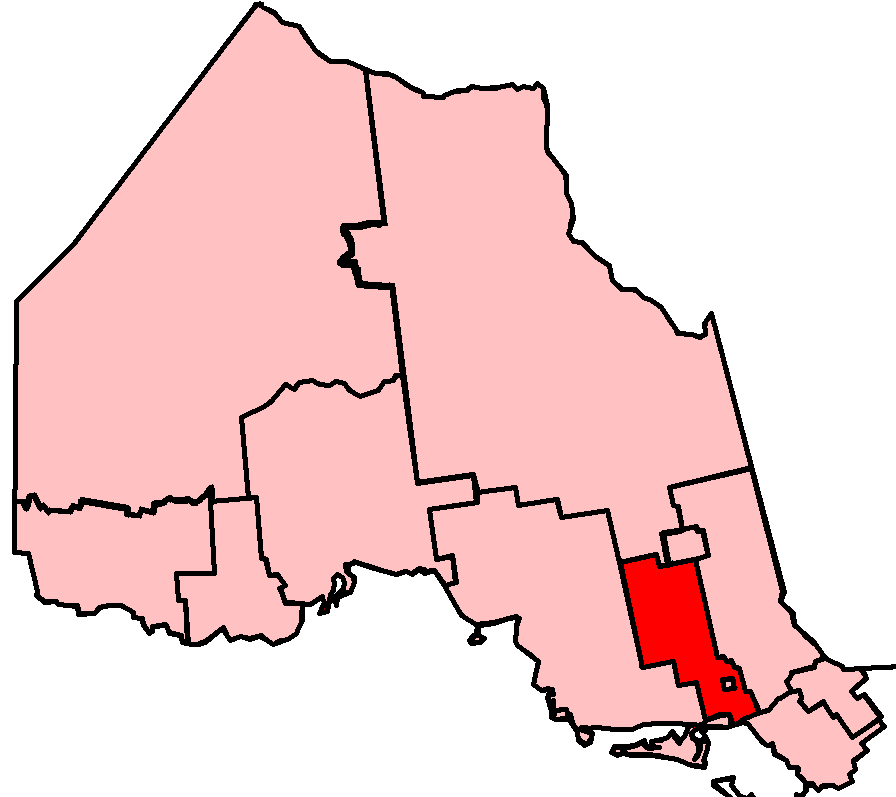
- Nickel Belt in relation to other electoral districts in Northern Ontario

Provincial electoral district
- Legislature: Legislative Assembly of Ontario
MPP
France Gélinas
New Democratic
- First contested: 1955
- Last contested: 2025

Demographics
- Population (2016): 84,520
- Electors (2018): 66,479
- Area (km²): 25,548
- Pop. density (per km²): 3.3
- Census division(s): Sudbury District, Greater Sudbury
- Census subdivision(s): Markstay-Warren, St. Charles, Killarney

Nickel Belt is a provincial electoral district located in Ontario, Canada. It elects one member to the Legislative Assembly of Ontario. The district is located in Northern Ontario and includes much of the eastern and southern parts of the District of Sudbury, as well as most of Greater Sudbury outside the city's urban core. Communities include Lively, Onaping, Levack, Dowling, Chelmsford, Naughton, Azilda, Coniston, Wahnapitae, Garson, Val Caron, Val Thérèse, Hanmer, and Capreol.

== Boundary redistribution ==
Prior to redistribution in 1998, the district included all of Sudbury District except the southeastern portion, as well as the western half of what was then the Regional Municipality of Sudbury (Walden, Rayside-Balfour, and Onaping Falls). The eastern half of the current Nickel Belt comprised the separate district of Sudbury East.

In 1998, Ontario was divided into the same electoral districts as those used for federal electoral purposes. They were redistributed whenever a readjustment took place at the federal level. This change resulted in Sudbury East being reabsorbed back into Nickel Belt.

In 2005, legislation was passed by the Legislature to divide Ontario into 107 electoral districts, beginning with the next provincial election in 2007. The eleven northern electoral districts, including Nickel Belt, are those defined for federal purposes in 1996, based on the 1991 census (except for a minor boundary adjustment). The 96 southern electoral districts are those defined for federal electoral purposes in 2003, based on the 2001 census. Without this legislation, the number of electoral districts in northern Ontario would have been reduced from eleven to ten.

This change primarily affects the Walden area, which is part of the Sudbury riding federally but remains in Nickel Belt provincially, and the West Nipissing area, which is part of Nickel Belt federally but Timiskaming—Cochrane provincially.

== Members of Provincial Parliament ==
Nickel Belt
Assembly	Years	Member	Party
Riding created
25th	1955–1959	Rhéal Bélisle	Progressive Conservative
26th	1959–1963	Rhéal Bélisle	Progressive Conservative
27th	1963–1967	Gaston Demers	Progressive Conservative
28th	1967–1971	Gaston Demers	Progressive Conservative
29th	1971–1975	Floyd Laughren	New Democratic
30th	1975–1977	Floyd Laughren	New Democratic
31st	1977–1981	Floyd Laughren	New Democratic
32nd	1981–1985	Floyd Laughren	New Democratic
33rd	1985–1987	Floyd Laughren	New Democratic
34th	1987–1990	Floyd Laughren	New Democratic
35th	1990–1995	Floyd Laughren	New Democratic
36th	1995–1998	Floyd Laughren	New Democratic
36th	1998–1999	Blain Morin	New Democratic
Absorbed Sudbury East
37th	1999–2003	Shelley Martel	New Democratic
38th	2003–2007	Shelley Martel	New Democratic
39th	2007–2011	France Gélinas	New Democratic
40th	2011–2014	France Gélinas	New Democratic
41st	2014–2018	France Gélinas	New Democratic
42nd	2018–2022	France Gélinas	New Democratic
43rd	2022–2025	France Gélinas	New Democratic
44th	2025–present	France Gélinas	New Democratic

== Election results ==
Winning party in each polling division of Nickel Belt at the 2025 Ontario general election

2025 Ontario general election
Party	Candidate	Votes	%	±%	Expenditures
New Democratic	France Gélinas	17,123	48.37	–2.41	$54,498
Progressive Conservative	Randy Hazlett	12,629	35.67	+5.81	$25,448
Liberal	Natalie Labbée	3,874	10.94	+1.05	$8,538
New Blue	Paul Divincenzo	676	1.91	–3.04	$0
Green	Connie Hill	631	1.78	–1.21	
Libertarian	James Chretien	470	1.33	–	$0
Total valid votes		35,403	99.17	–	$125,506
Total rejected, unmarked and declined ballots		298	0.83	+0.39	
Turnout		35,701	50.51	+4.99	
Eligible voters		70,685			
New Democratic hold		Swing		–4.11	
Source: Elections Ontario

Winning party in each polling division of Nickel Belt at the 2022 Ontario general election

2022 Ontario general election
Party	Candidate	Votes	%	±%	Expenditures
New Democratic	France Gélinas	15,611	50.77	–12.73	$55,649
Progressive Conservative	Randy Hazlett	9,181	29.86	+7.87	$23,127
Liberal	Gilles Proulx	3,042	9.89	+1.17	$8,861
New Blue	Melanie Savoie	1,522	4.95	–	$4,981
Green	Glenys Babcock	921	3.00	–0.12	$0
Ontario Party	Willy Schneider	470	1.53	–	$1,507
Total valid votes/expense limit		30,747	99.56	–	$106,532
Total rejected, unmarked and declined ballots		137	0.44	–0.57	
Turnout		30,884	45.51	–9.91	
Eligible voters		67,858			
New Democratic hold		Swing		–10.30	
Source: Elections Ontario

2018 Ontario general election
Party	Candidate	Votes	%	±%	Expenditures
New Democratic	France Gélinas	23,157	63.50	+0.88	$40,029
Progressive Conservative	Jo-Ann Cardinal	8,018	21.99	+10.07	$28,428
Liberal	Tay Butt	3,182	8.73	–13.17	$8,353
Green	Bill Crumplin	1,137	3.12	–0.45	$1,915
Northern Ontario Heritage	Matthew del Papa	373	1.02	–	none listed
Libertarian	James Chretien	220	0.60	–	none listed
Consensus Ontario	Kevin R. Brault	214	0.59	–	none listed
None of the Above	Bailey Burch-Belanger	166	0.46	–	$0
Total valid votes/expense limit		36,467	98.98		
Total rejected, unmarked and declined ballots		375	1.02	–0.05	
Turnout		36,842	55.42	+5.42	
Eligible voters		66,479			
New Democratic notional hold		Swing		–4.59	
Source: Elections Ontario

2014 general election redistributed results
Party	Vote	%
New Democratic	20,104	62.62
Liberal	7,031	21.90
Progressive Conservative	3,827	11.92
Green	1,145	3.57

2014 Ontario general election
Party	Candidate	Votes	%	±%
New Democratic	France Gélinas	20,104	62.62	+7.76
Liberal	James Tregonning	7,031	21.90	–2.32
Progressive Conservative	Marck Blay	3,827	11.92	–6.37
Green	Heather K. Dahlstrom	1,145	3.57	+0.93
Total valid votes		32,107	98.94	
Total rejected, unmarked and declined ballots		345	1.06	+0.75
Turnout		32,452	50.00	+0.45
Eligible voters		64,910		
New Democratic hold		Swing		+5.04
Source: Elections Ontario

2011 Ontario general election
Party	Candidate	Votes	%	±%
New Democratic	France Gélinas	16,876	54.86	+8.27
Liberal	Tony Ryma	7,451	24.22	–13.86
Progressive Conservative	Paula Peroni	5,625	18.29	+8.24
Green	Stephanie-Lynn Russell	810	2.63	–1.60
Total valid votes		30,762	99.69	
Total rejected, unmarked and declined ballots		96	0.31	–0.15
Turnout		30,858	49.55	–4.01
Eligible voters		62,276		
New Democratic hold		Swing		+11.07
Source: Elections Ontario

2007 Ontario general election
Party	Candidate	Votes	%	±%
New Democratic	France Gélinas	15,126	46.59	+0.06
Liberal	Ron Dupuis	12,364	38.08	–0.56
Progressive Conservative	Renee Germain	3,263	10.05	–3.44
Green	Fred Twilley	1,374	4.23	+2.89
Family Coalition	Richard St-Denis	341	1.05	–
Total valid votes		32,468	99.54	
Total rejected, unmarked and declined ballots		151	0.46	–0.16
Turnout		32,619	53.56	–8.26
Eligible voters		60,905		
New Democratic hold		Swing		+0.31
Source: Elections Ontario

2003 Ontario general election
Party	Candidate	Votes	%	±%
New Democratic	Shelley Martel	16,567	46.52	+4.57
Liberal	Alex McCauley	13,759	38.64	+9.89
Progressive Conservative	Dave Kilgour	4,804	13.49	–15.81
Green	Robert Nevin	479	1.35	–
Total valid votes		35,609	99.38	
Total rejected, unmarked and declined ballots		222	0.62	+0.21
Turnout		35,831	61.82	+2.23
Eligible voters		57,959		
New Democratic hold		Swing		–2.66
Source: Elections Ontario

1999 Ontario general election
Party	Candidate	Votes	%	±%
New Democratic	Shelley Martel	14,833	41.95	+1.08
Progressive Conservative	Gerry Courtemanche	10,359	29.30	–1.51
Liberal	Ron Dupuis	10,165	28.75	+0.43
Total valid votes		35,357	99.59	
Total rejected, unmarked and declined ballots		146	0.41	–0.22
Turnout		35,503	59.59	+6.82
Eligible voters		59,577		
New Democratic hold		Swing		+1.29
Source: Elections Ontario

Ontario provincial by-election, October 1, 1998 Resignation of Floyd Laughren to accept appointment as chair of Ontario Energy Board
Party	Candidate	Votes	%	±%
New Democratic	Blain Morin	5,537	40.88	–5.66
Progressive Conservative	Gerry Courtemanche	4,173	30.81	+11.60
Liberal	Frank Madigan	3,836	28.32	–3.93
Total valid votes		13,546	99.37	
Total rejected, unmarked and declined ballots		86	0.63	–0.33
Turnout		13,632	52.77	–11.93
Eligible voters		25,834		
New Democratic hold		Swing		–8.63
Source: Elections Ontario0

1995 Ontario general election
Party	Candidate	Votes	%	±%
New Democratic	Floyd Laughren	8,007	46.54	–12.00
Liberal	Betty Rheaume	5,549	32.25	+12.98
Progressive Conservative	Frank Deburger	3,305	19.21	+13.51
Independent	Michel R. Chartrand	225	1.31	–
Natural Law	Grace Tancock	119	0.69	–
Total valid votes		17,205	99.04	
Total rejected, unmarked and declined ballots		167	0.96	+0.25
Turnout		17,372	64.70	–4.37
Eligible voters		26,850		
New Democratic hold		Swing		–12.49
Source: Elections Ontario

1990 Ontario general election
Party	Candidate	Votes	%	±%
New Democratic	Floyd Laughren	9,925	58.54	+0.33
Liberal	Betty Rheaume	3,267	19.27	–3.56
Confederation of Regions	Gren Rogers	2,796	16.49	–
Progressive Conservative	Paul J. Demers	967	5.70	–13.26
Total valid votes		16,955	99.29	
Total rejected, unmarked and declined ballots		121	0.71	+0.37
Turnout		17,076	69.07	–1.06
Eligible voters		24,722		
New Democratic hold		Swing		+1.95
Source: Elections Ontario

1987 Ontario general election
Party	Candidate	Votes	%	±%
New Democratic	Floyd Laughren	9,849	58.21	+5.83
Liberal	Leo Pevato	3,863	22.83	+9.58
Progressive Conservative	Evelyn Dutrisac	3,208	18.96	–15.41
Total valid votes		16,920	99.66	
Total rejected ballots		57	0.34	–0.37
Turnout		16,977	70.14	–0.21
Eligible voters		24,206		
New Democratic hold		Swing		–1.87
Source: Elections Ontario

1985 Ontario general election
Party	Candidate	Votes	%	±%
New Democratic	Floyd Laughren	8,912	52.37	–2.48
Progressive Conservative	Evelyn Dutrisac	5,849	34.37	+21.94
Liberal	Trudy Bolduc	2,255	13.25	–19.47
Total valid votes		17,016	99.29	
Total rejected ballots		121	0.71	+0.36
Turnout		17,137	70.34	+7.03
Eligible voters		24,362		
New Democratic hold		Swing		–12.21
Source: Elections Ontario

1981 Ontario general election
Party	Candidate	Votes	%	±%
New Democratic	Floyd Laughren	8,451	54.85	–2.60
Liberal	Elmer Sopha	5,041	32.72	+14.12
Progressive Conservative	Andre Lalande	1,915	12.43	–11.52
Total valid votes		15,407	99.66	
Total rejected ballots		53	0.34	+0.09
Turnout		15,460	63.31	–4.09
Eligible voters		24,418		
New Democratic hold		Swing		–8.36
Source: Elections Ontario

1977 Ontario general election
Party	Candidate	Votes	%	±%
New Democratic	Floyd Laughren	9,410	57.45	–2.64
Progressive Conservative	Marty McAllister	3,923	23.95	+0.29
Liberal	Paul Adam	3,046	18.60	+2.35
Total valid votes		16,379	99.75	
Total rejected ballots		41	0.25	–0.07
Turnout		16,420	67.41	–5.12
Eligible voters		24,359		
New Democratic hold		Swing		–1.46
Source: Elections Ontario

1975 Ontario general election
Party	Candidate	Votes	%	±%
New Democratic	Floyd Laughren	10,243	60.09	+10.72
Progressive Conservative	Gilles Pelland	4,034	23.66	–14.93
Liberal	Patrick Owens	2,770	16.25	+4.21
Total valid votes		17,047	99.68	
Total rejected ballots		54	0.32	–0.33
Turnout		17,101	72.53	–6.80
Eligible voters		23,577		
New Democratic hold		Swing		+12.83
Source: Elections Ontario

1971 Ontario general election
Party	Candidate	Votes	%	±%
New Democratic	Floyd Laughren	9,003	49.37	+11.20
Progressive Conservative	Gaston Demers	7,039	38.60	–9.04
Liberal	Roland Beaudry	2,195	12.04	–2.16
Total valid votes		18,237	99.36	
Total rejected ballots		118	0.64	+0.07
Turnout		18,355	79.34	+3.91
Eligible voters		23,136		
New Democratic gain from Progressive Conservative		Swing		+10.12
Source: Elections Ontario

1967 Ontario general election
Party	Candidate	Votes	%	±%
Progressive Conservative	Gaston Demers	6,210	47.63	+11.14
New Democratic	Don Scott	4,976	38.17	+10.67
Liberal	Lorenzo Lalonde	1,851	14.20	–18.48
Total valid votes		13,037	99.43	
Total rejected ballots		75	0.57	–0.03
Turnout		13,112	75.43	+7.95
Eligible voters		17,384		
Progressive Conservative hold		Swing		+10.91
Source: Elections Ontario

1963 Ontario general election
Party	Candidate	Votes	%	±%
Progressive Conservative	Gaston Demers	9,155	36.49	–0.36
Liberal	Leo Jones	8,199	32.68	–2.15
New Democratic	Ed Levert	6,898	27.50	–0.82
Independent	Harold A. Prescott	835	3.33	–
Total valid votes		25,087	99.39	
Total rejected ballots		153	0.61	–0.28
Turnout		25,240	67.48	–3.68
Eligible voters		37,405		
Progressive Conservative hold		Swing		+1.26
Source: Elections Ontario

1959 Ontario general election
Party	Candidate	Votes	%	±%
Progressive Conservative	Rhéal Bélisle	8,244	36.86	–1.13
Liberal	Don Couture	7,791	34.83	+7.10
Co-operative Commonwealth	Ed Levert	6,333	28.31	+17.39
Total valid votes		22,368	99.11	
Total rejected ballots		200	0.89	–0.47
Turnout		22,568	71.16	+0.01
Eligible voters		31,716		
Progressive Conservative hold		Swing		–4.11
Source: Elections Ontario

1955 Ontario general election
Party	Candidate	Votes	%
Progressive Conservative	Rhéal Bélisle	7,088	37.98
Liberal	F. Baxter Ricard	5,175	27.73
Independent	Robert Carlin	4,359	23.36
Co-operative Commonwealth	William P. Stewart	2,039	10.93
Total valid votes		18,661	98.64
Total rejected ballots		257	1.36
Turnout		18,918	71.14
Eligible voters		26,591	
Progressive Conservative pickup new district.			
Source: Elections Ontario

== 2007 electoral reform referendum ==
2007 Ontario electoral reform referendum
Side	Votes	%
First Past the Post	21,313	68.9
Mixed member proportional	9,609	31.1
Total valid votes	30,912	100.0

== See also ==
- List of Ontario provincial electoral districts
- Canadian provincial electoral districts
