= Harry Danford =

Canadian politician

Ontario MPP
- In office 1995–1999
- Preceded by: Elmer Buchanan
- Succeeded by: Riding abolished
- Constituency: Hastings—Peterborough

Personal details
- Born: 1939 (age 86–87)
- Party: Progressive Conservative
- Occupation: Farmer

Harry Danford (born c. 1939) is a former Canadian politician in Ontario, Canada. He was a Progressive Conservative member of the Legislative Assembly of Ontario from 1995 to 1999.

== Background ==
Danford worked as a farmer before entering politics and was a member of the Hastings County Milk and Holstein Clubs.

== Politics ==
Danford was a member of the Rawdon council from 1982 to 1984 and served as Reeve and Warden of Hastings County from 1982 to 1994.

In the 1995 provincial election, Danford defeated incumbent NDP candidate Elmer Buchanan by 7,859 votes in the riding of Hastings—Peterborough. He was a backbench supporter of Mike Harris's government for the next four years and served as parliamentary assistant to the Minister of Agriculture and Food for this entire period.

During his time in the legislature, Danford also piloted a successful private member's bill ( Bill 150) which designated June 19 as United Empire Loyalist Day in Ontario.

In 1996, the Harris government reduced the number of provincial ridings from 130 to 103. This forced many MPPs from the same party to face one another for re-nomination. Danford defeated fellow Tory MPP Bill Vankoughnet to win the Progressive Conservative nomination for the 1999 provincial election in Hastings—Frontenac—Lennox and Addington, but lost to Liberal Leona Dombrowsky by almost 2,000 votes. Danford returned to farming after his defeat.
