= Jim Pollock =

Canadian politician (1930–2021)

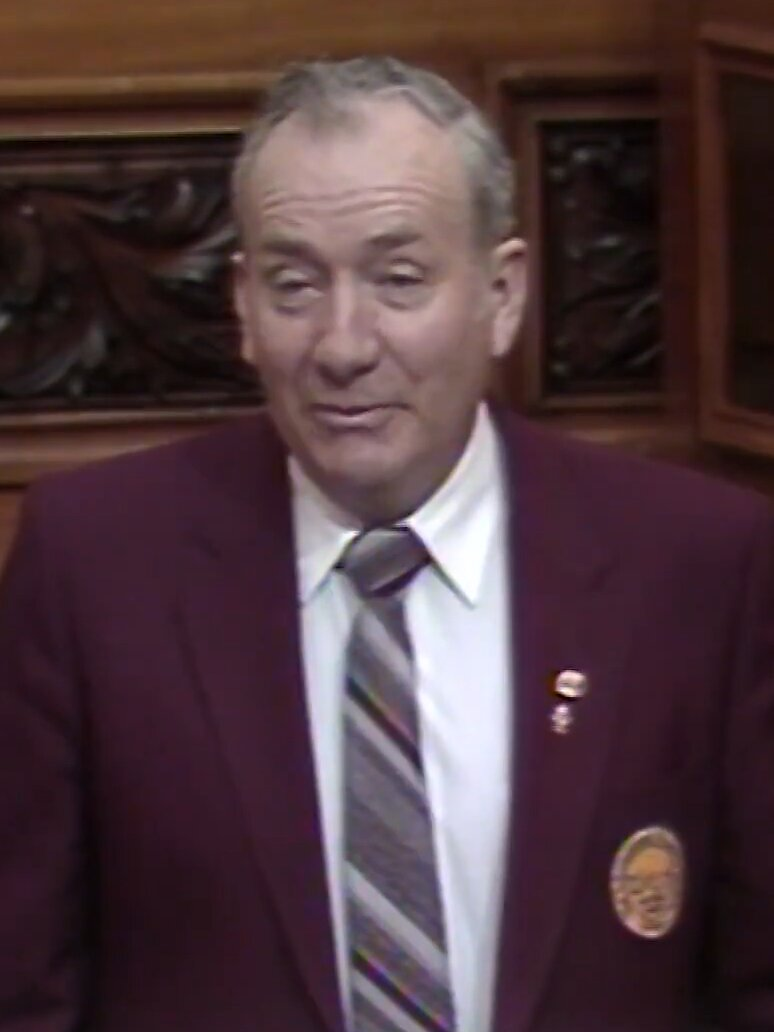
- Pollock in 1986

Ontario MPP
- In office 1981–1990
- Preceded by: Clarke Rollins
- Succeeded by: Elmer Buchanan
- Constituency: Hastings—Peterborough

Personal details
- Born: July 8, 1930 Stirling, Ontario, Canada
- Died: October 28, 2021 (aged 91) Peterborough, Ontario, Canada
- Party: Progressive Conservative
- Occupation: Farmer

James Ivan Pollock (July 8, 1930 – October 28, 2021) was a politician in Ontario, Canada. He was a Progressive Conservative member of the Legislative Assembly of Ontario from 1981 to 1990 who represented the riding of Hastings—Peterborough.

== Background ==
Pollock was educated at Rawdon High School, and worked as a farmer before entering politics. He was a reeve of Rawdon Township, and a Warden in the County of Hastings. Pollock was also an active freemason.

== Politics ==
He was elected to the Ontario legislature in the 1981 provincial election, defeating Liberal candidate Dave Hobson by just under 3,000 votes in the riding of Hastings—Peterborough. Elmer Buchanan of the NDP finished third. Pollock was a backbench supporter of Premiers Bill Davis and Frank Miller in the parliaments which followed. In 1983, he brought forward a resolution to make the blue jay the official bird of Ontario.

The Progressive Conservatives lost power following the 1985 election, although Pollock actually increased his majority. He was one of only sixteen Progressive Conservatives re-elected in the 1987 election, defeating Liberal Carman Metcalfe and Elmer Buchanan of the NDP.

The Progressive Conservatives made a modest recovery in the 1990 provincial election, although Pollock lost his seat to Buchanan amid a provincial majority government victory for the NDP. Buchanan won the election by 896 votes.
