= Dufferin–Simcoe (provincial electoral district) =

Ontario electoral district

Defunct provincial electoral district
- Legislature: Legislative Assembly of Ontario
- District created: 1933
- District abolished: 1986
- First contested: 1934
- Last contested: 1985

Dufferin–Simcoe was an electoral riding in Ontario, Canada. It was created in 1934 during a major redistribution of Ontario ridings. It was abolished in 1986 before the 1987 election and merged into Simcoe West.

== Members of Provincial Parliament ==
Dufferin–Simcoe
Assembly	Years	Member	Party
Created from Dufferin and parts of Simcoe Southwest before the 1934 election
19th	1934–1937	Wilfred Smith	Liberal
20th	1937–1943	Wally Downer	Progressive Conservative
21st	1943–1945	Wally Downer	Progressive Conservative
22nd	1945–1948	Wally Downer	Progressive Conservative
23rd	1948–1951	Wally Downer	Progressive Conservative
24th	1951–1955	Wally Downer	Progressive Conservative
25th	1955–1959	Wally Downer	Progressive Conservative
26th	1959–1963	Wally Downer	Progressive Conservative
27th	1963–1967	Wally Downer	Progressive Conservative
28th	1967–1971	Wally Downer	Progressive Conservative
29th	1971–1975	Wally Downer	Progressive Conservative
30th	1975–1977	George McCague	Progressive Conservative
31st	1977–1981	George McCague	Progressive Conservative
32nd	1981–1985	George McCague	Progressive Conservative
33rd	1985–1987	George McCague	Progressive Conservative
Sourced from the Ontario Legislative Assembly
Merged into Simcoe West before the 1987 election

== Election results ==
1985 Ontario general election: Dufferin—Simcoe
Party	Candidate	Votes	%	±%
Progressive Conservative	George McCague	16,198	50.09	–12.74
Liberal	Gary Johnson	11,822	36.56	+13.30
New Democratic	Jeff Koechlin	4,316	13.35	–0.56
Total valid votes		32,336	99.57	
Total rejected ballots		141	0.43	+0.10
Turnout		32,477	57.86	+1.53
Eligible voters		56,130		
Progressive Conservative hold		Swing		–13.02
Source: Elections Ontario

1981 Ontario general election: Dufferin—Simcoe
Party	Candidate	Votes	%	±%
Progressive Conservative	George McCague	18,101	62.83	+14.02
Liberal	Larry MacKenzie	6,702	23.26	–6.53
New Democratic	Ed Robinson	4,007	13.91	–6.11
Total valid votes		28,810	99.66	
Total rejected ballots		98	0.34	+0.00
Turnout		28,908	56.33	–8.97
Eligible voters		51,318		
Progressive Conservative hold		Swing		+10.28
Source: Elections Ontario

1977 Ontario general election: Dufferin—Simcoe
Party	Candidate	Votes	%	±%
Progressive Conservative	George McCague	15,528	48.81	+2.92
Liberal	James L. Wales	9,480	29.80	–10.62
New Democratic	Bill Fox	6,369	20.02	+8.44
Independent	Régent G. Gervais	438	1.38	–
Total valid votes		31,815	99.66	
Total rejected ballots		107	0.34	+0.02
Turnout		31,922	65.30	–3.16
Eligible voters		48,888		
Progressive Conservative hold		Swing		+6.77
Source: Elections Ontario

1975 Ontario general election: Dufferin—Simcoe
Party	Candidate	Votes	%	±%
Progressive Conservative	George McCague	14,201	45.88	–6.09
Liberal	Bob Beattie	12,510	40.42	+7.64
New Democratic	Ian Perkins	3,585	11.58	–3.67
Social Credit	Rachelle Cornelsen	655	2.12	–
Total valid votes		30,951	99.68	
Total rejected ballots		99	0.32	–0.24
Turnout		31,050	68.46	+0.18
Eligible voters		45,357		
Progressive Conservative hold		Swing		–6.86
Source: Elections Ontario

1971 Ontario general election: Dufferin—Simcoe
Party	Candidate	Votes	%	±%
Progressive Conservative	Wally Downer	12,063	51.97	–5.92
Liberal	Robert Walter Elliot	7,609	32.78	+4.77
New Democratic	Derek R. Morley	3,540	15.25	+1.14
Total valid votes		23,212	99.44	
Total rejected ballots		130	0.56	–0.16
Turnout		23,342	68.28	+15.50
Eligible voters		34,187		
Progressive Conservative hold		Swing		–5.34
Source: Elections Ontario

1967 Ontario general election: Dufferin—Simcoe
Party	Candidate	Votes	%	±%
Progressive Conservative	Wally Downer	7,973	57.88	–8.41
Liberal	Josephine A. Casey	3,858	28.01	+1.01
New Democratic	William G. Shannon	1,943	14.11	+7.40
Total valid votes		13,774	99.28	
Total rejected ballots		100	0.72	–0.07
Turnout		13,874	52.77	–2.58
Eligible voters		26,289		
Progressive Conservative hold		Swing		–4.71
Source: Elections Ontario

1963 Ontario general election: Dufferin—Simcoe
Party	Candidate	Votes	%	±%
Progressive Conservative	Wally Downer	8,875	66.29	–2.61
Liberal	James L. Cooke	3,615	27.00	–4.10
New Democratic	Angus M. Blair	898	6.71	–
Total valid votes		13,388	99.21	
Total rejected ballots		107	0.79	–0.09
Turnout		13,495	55.36	+2.65
Eligible voters		24,378		
Progressive Conservative hold		Swing		+0.74
Source: Elections Ontario

1959 Ontario general election: Dufferin—Simcoe
Party	Candidate	Votes	%	±%
Progressive Conservative	Wally Downer	8,390	68.90	+6.81
Liberal	Robert Wales	3,787	31.10	–1.21
Total valid votes		12,177	99.12	
Total rejected ballots		108	0.88	+0.13
Turnout		12,285	52.70	–5.00
Eligible voters		23,310		
Progressive Conservative hold		Swing		+4.01
Source: Elections Ontario

1955 Ontario general election: Dufferin—Simcoe
Party	Candidate	Votes	%	±%
Progressive Conservative	Wally Downer	7,778	62.09	+3.76
Liberal	William Hunter	4,047	32.31	–3.06
Co-operative Commonwealth	Arnold Peters	702	5.60	–0.70
Total valid votes		12,527	99.25	
Total rejected ballots		95	0.75	+0.08
Turnout		12,622	57.70	–5.02
Eligible voters		21,875		
Progressive Conservative hold		Swing		+3.41
Source: Elections Ontario

1951 Ontario general election: Dufferin—Simcoe
Party	Candidate	Votes	%	±%
Progressive Conservative	Wally Downer	7,535	58.33	+4.20
Liberal	William Hunter	4,569	35.37	+0.47
Co-operative Commonwealth	Harold Marshall	814	6.30	–4.66
Total valid votes		12,918	99.33	
Total rejected ballots		87	0.67	+0.11
Turnout		13,005	62.72	+4.81
Eligible voters		20,736		
Progressive Conservative hold		Swing		+1.87
Source: Elections Ontario

1948 Ontario general election: Dufferin—Simcoe
Party	Candidate	Votes	%	±%
Progressive Conservative	Wally Downer	7,035	54.13	–20.17
Liberal	Charles William Maitland	4,536	34.90	–
Co-operative Commonwealth	Arnold Rorabeck	1,425	10.96	–14.74
Total valid votes		12,996	99.44	
Total rejected ballots		73	0.56	–0.26
Turnout		13,069	57.91	–3.80
Eligible voters		22,568		
Progressive Conservative hold		Swing		–10.08
Source: Elections Ontario

1945 Ontario general election: Dufferin—Simcoe
Party	Candidate	Votes	%	±%
Progressive Conservative	Wally Downer	9,216	74.30	+24.51
Co-operative Commonwealth	Richard McCullough	3,188	25.70	+0.91
Total valid votes		12,404	99.18	
Total rejected ballots		102	0.82	–0.03
Turnout		12,506	61.71	+13.19
Eligible voters		20,265		
Progressive Conservative hold		Swing		+11.80
Source: Elections Ontario

1943 Ontario general election: Dufferin—Simcoe
Party	Candidate	Votes	%	±%
Progressive Conservative	Wally Downer	5,134	49.79	–3.43
Liberal	Charles W. Henry	2,621	25.42	–21.36
Co-operative Commonwealth	Richard McCullough	2,557	24.80	–
Total valid votes		10,312	99.15	
Total rejected ballots		88	0.85	–0.17
Turnout		10,400	48.53	–24.93
Eligible voters		21,432		
Progressive Conservative hold		Swing		+8.96
Source: Elections Ontario

1937 Ontario general election: Dufferin—Simcoe
Party	Candidate	Votes	%	±%
Conservative	Wally Downer	8,484	53.22	+6.82
Liberal	Wilfred Davy Smith	7,457	46.78	–6.82
Total valid votes		15,941	98.99	
Total rejected ballots		163	1.01	–0.11
Turnout		16,104	73.46	–2.74
Eligible voters		21,922		
Conservative gain from Liberal		Swing		+6.82
Source: Elections Ontario

1934 Ontario general election: Dufferin—Simcoe
Party	Candidate	Votes	%	±%
Liberal	Wilfred Davy Smith	8,393	53.60	–
Conservative	James Edgar Jamieson	7,267	46.40	–
Total valid votes		15,660	98.88	
Total rejected ballots		177	1.12	–
Turnout		15,837	76.21	–
Eligible voters		20,782		
Liberal pickup new district.				
Source: Elections Ontario
