= Hastings—Peterborough (provincial electoral district) =

Ontario electoral district

Defunct provincial electoral district
- Legislature: Legislative Assembly of Ontario
- District created: 1975
- District abolished: 1996
- First contested: 1975
- Last contested: 1995

Demographics
- Census division(s): Hastings, Prince Edward
- Census subdivision(s): Bancroft, Belleville, Carlow/Mayo, Centre Hastings, Deseronto, Faraday, Hastings Highlands, Limerick, Madoc, Marmora and Lake, Prince Edward, Stirling-Rawdon, Tudor and Cashel, Tweed, Tyendinaga, Tyendinaga Mohawk Territory, Wollaston

Hastings—Peterborough was a provincial electoral district represented in the Ontario Legislature from 1975 to 1999. The riding was created in 1975 from parts of Hastings and Peterborough East ridings. It was an approximate duplication of the federal electoral district of Hastings—Peterborough.

It was initially defined, federally, as consisting of the part of the county of Peterborough lying east of and including the townships of Anstruther, Burleigh, Dummer and Asphodel; and the part of the county of Hastings lying north of and including the townships of Rawdon, Huntingdon, Madoc and Elzevir.

In 1971, it was redefined (federal) to consist of the part of the county of Peterborough lying east of and including the townships of Anstruther, Burleigh, Dummer and Asphodel; and hat part of the county, together with that part of the county of Hastings lying north of a line described as commencing at the southwest corner of the township of Rawdon and following the south boundary of the said township, the south and east boundaries of the township of Huntingdon and the south boundary of the townships of Madoc and Elzevir to the east boundary of the said county.

The federal electoral district was abolished in 1952 when it was redistributed between Hastings—Frontenac and Peterborough ridings.

The provincial electoral district continued until the redistribution of 1999 when it was abolished, and the respective areas migrated into Peterborough, Northumberland—Quinte West, and Hastings-Frontenac-Lennox and Addington electoral districts.

== Members of Provincial Parliament ==
Hastings
Assembly	Years	Member	Party
Riding created from Hastings East and Hastings West ridings in 1967
28th	1967–1971	Clarke Rollins	Progressive Conservative
29th	1971–1975	Clarke Rollins	Progressive Conservative

Hastings—Peterborough
Assembly	Years	Member	Party
Riding redistributed and named Hastings—Peterborough in 1975
30th	1975–1977	Clarke Rollins	Progressive Conservative
31st	1977–1981	Clarke Rollins	Progressive Conservative
32nd	1981–1985	Jim Pollock	Progressive Conservative
33rd	1985–1987	Jim Pollock	Progressive Conservative
34th	1987–1990	Jim Pollock	Progressive Conservative
35th	1990–1995	Elmer Buchanan	New Democratic
36th	1995–1999	Harry Danford	Progressive Conservative
Sourced from the Ontario Legislative Assembly

== Provincial election results ==
1995 Ontario general election
Party	Candidate	Votes	%	±%
Progressive Conservative	Harry Danford	16,187	54.17	+17.45
New Democratic	Elmer Buchanan	8,328	27.87	–12.02
Liberal	Barb Jinkerson	4,056	13.57	–1.58
Family Coalition	John-Henry Westen	1,002	3.35	–0.89
Natural Law	David Hetherington	308	1.03	–
Total valid votes		29,881	99.08	
Total rejected, unmarked and declined ballots		278	0.92	+0.40
Turnout		30,159	67.44	–1.32
Eligible voters		44,719		
Progressive Conservative gain from New Democratic		Swing		+14.73
Source: Elections Ontario

1990 Ontario general election
Party	Candidate	Votes	%	±%
New Democratic	Elmer Buchanan	11,283	39.89	+13.78
Progressive Conservative	Jim Pollock	10,387	36.73	–2.61
Liberal	Mike Beeston	4,285	15.15	–19.40
Family Coalition	Anthony Kuttschrutter	1,199	4.24	–
Confederation of Regions	Ronald S. Gerow	1,128	3.99	–
Total valid votes		28,282	99.48	
Total rejected, unmarked and declined ballots		149	0.52	+0.10
Turnout		28,431	68.76	+2.67
Eligible voters		41,347		
New Democratic gain from Progressive Conservative		Swing		+16.59
Source: Elections Ontario

1987 Ontario general election
Party	Candidate	Votes	%	±%
Progressive Conservative	Jim Pollock	9,910	39.33	–15.57
Liberal	Carman Metcalfe	8,705	34.55	+9.56
New Democratic	Elmer Buchanan	6,579	26.11	+6.01
Total valid votes		25,194	99.58	
Total rejected ballots		107	0.42	–0.17
Turnout		25,301	66.09	+5.88
Eligible voters		38,281		
Progressive Conservative hold		Swing		–12.57
Source: Elections Ontario

1985 Ontario general election
Party	Candidate	Votes	%	±%
Progressive Conservative	Jim Pollock	12,272	54.91	+5.30
Liberal	A. Paul Ockenden	5,586	24.99	–12.62
New Democratic	Elmer Buchanan	4,492	20.10	+7.33
Total valid votes		22,350	99.40	
Total rejected ballots		134	0.60	+0.29
Turnout		22,484	60.21	–6.23
Eligible voters		37,343		
Progressive Conservative hold		Swing		+8.96
Source: Elections Ontario

1981 Ontario general election
Party	Candidate	Votes	%	±%
Progressive Conservative	Jim Pollock	11,528	49.61	+2.39
Liberal	David J. Hobson	8,741	37.62	–1.94
New Democratic	Elmer Buchanan	2,968	12.77	+1.18
Total valid votes		23,237	99.70	
Total rejected ballots		71	0.30	+0.03
Turnout		23,308	66.44	–6.50
Eligible voters		35,082		
Progressive Conservative hold		Swing		+2.16
Source: Elections Ontario

1977 Ontario general election
Party	Candidate	Votes	%	±%
Progressive Conservative	Clarke Rollins	11,442	47.22	–0.66
Liberal	David J. Hobson	9,584	39.55	+1.94
New Democratic	Elmer Buchanan	2,808	11.59	–1.44
Independent	William R. Hawthorne	247	1.02	–
Independent	Gary Beamish	149	0.61	–
Total valid votes		24,230	99.73	
Total rejected ballots		66	0.27	–0.03
Turnout		24,296	72.94	+2.01
Eligible voters		33,310		
Progressive Conservative hold		Swing		–1.30
Source: Elections Ontario

1975 Ontario general election
Party	Candidate	Votes	%	±%
Progressive Conservative	Clarke Rollins	10,912	47.89	–
Liberal	David J. Hobson	8,571	37.61	–
New Democratic	Bob Thompson	2,969	13.03	–
Social Credit	Nancy Arnold	335	1.47	–
Total valid votes		22,787	99.70	
Total rejected ballots		69	0.30	–
Turnout		22,856	70.93	–
Eligible voters		32,223		
Progressive Conservative notional hold		Swing		–
Source: Elections Ontario

=== Hastings (1967–1975) ===
1971 Ontario general election: Hastings
Party	Candidate	Votes	%	±%
Progressive Conservative	Clarke Rollins	9,195	59.79	–8.86
Liberal	Ian Edward Munro	4,559	29.64	+9.29
New Democratic	Richard Lunn	1,626	10.57	–0.43
Total valid votes		15,380	99.26	
Total rejected ballots		114	0.74	+0.11
Turnout		15,494	70.12	+2.15
Eligible voters		22,095		
Progressive Conservative hold		Swing		–9.07
Source: Elections Ontario

1967 Ontario general election: Hastings
Party	Candidate	Votes	%
Progressive Conservative	Clarke Rollins	8,575	68.64
Liberal	Paul E. Russell	2,543	20.36
New Democratic	Sydney Rodger	1,374	11.00
Total valid votes		12,492	99.37
Total rejected ballots		79	0.63
Turnout		12,571	67.98
Eligible voters		18,493	
Progressive Conservative pickup new district.			
Source: Elections Ontario
