= Clarke Rollins =

Canadian politician

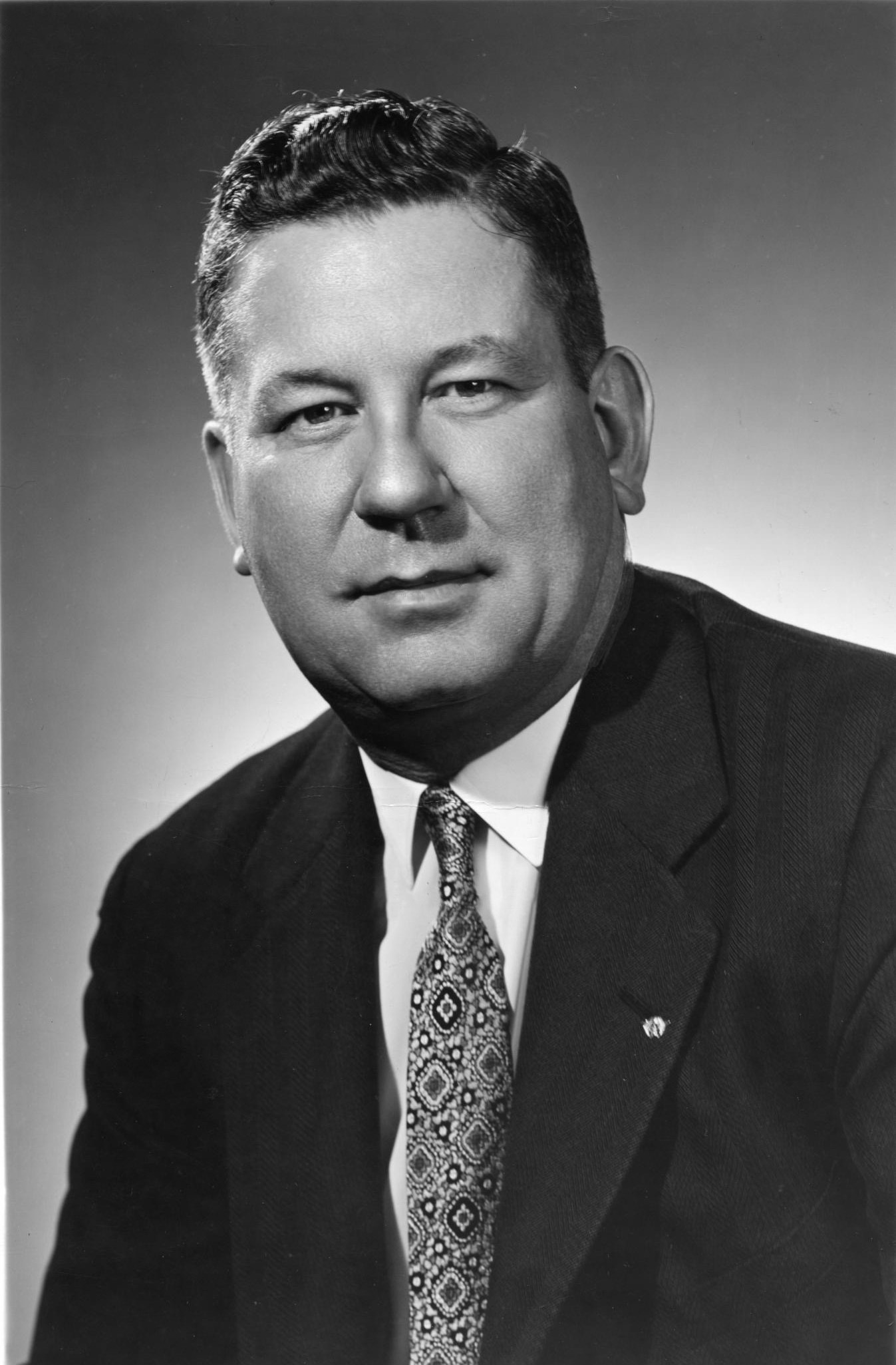
- Rollins in 1960

Ontario MPP
- In office 1959–1981
- Preceded by: Lloyd Harrison Price
- Succeeded by: Jim Pollock
- Constituency: Hastings—Peterborough (1975-1981); Hastings (1967-1975); Hastings East (1959-1967)

Personal details
- Born: October 14, 1912 Coe Hill, Ontario
- Died: November 25, 1996 (aged 84) Bancroft, Ontario
- Party: Progressive Conservative
- Spouse: Beverley Hurley
- Relations: Doug Rollins (cousin)
- Children: 3
- Occupation: Petroleum distributor

Clarke Tivy Rollins (October 14, 1912 – November 25, 1996) was a politician in Ontario, Canada. He was a Progressive Conservative member of the Legislative Assembly of Ontario from 1959 to 1981 who represented the ridings of Hastings East, Hastings, and Hastings—Peterborough.

== Background ==
He was born in Coe Hill, Ontario, the son of Charles Samuel Rollins, and educated there and in Belleville. Rollins married Beverley Hurley and had three sons. He was a freemason and his cousin, Doug Rollins, represented the neighbouring riding of Quinte as a Progressive Conservative Member of Provincial Parliament from 1995 to 1999. He died at his home in Bancroft, Ontario.

== Politics ==
He served as reeve for Wollaston Township and warden for Hastings County. Rollins also served as chairman of the St. Lawrence Parks Commission. He was elected to the legislature in 1959 after upsetting incumbent MPP Lloyd Harrison Price for the Progressive Conservative nomination, several months after Price was acclaimed as the riding's MPP in a by-election. Rollins went on to defeat Liberal candidate Leslie McLaren in the general election by 1,897 votes. He was re-elected in five times before retiring in 1981. He served 22 years as a backbench supporter of Leslie Frost, John Robarts, and Bill Davis.
