= Alexander McLaren (politician) =

Canadian politician

Ontario MPP
- In office 1894–1898
- Preceded by: William Parker Hudson
- Succeeded by: Samuel Russell
- Constituency: Hastings East

Personal details
- Born: December 10, 1859 Melrose, Hastings County, Canada West
- Died: July 2, 1916 (aged 56) Belleville, Ontario
- Party: Liberal-Patron
- Occupation: Farmer

Alexander McLaren (December 10, 1859 – July 2, 1916) was an Ontario farmer and political figure. He represented Hastings East in the Legislative Assembly of Ontario as a Liberal-Patrons of Industry member from 1894 to 1898.

He was born in Melrose, Hastings County, and he died in Belleville in 1916.
