= Leo Jordan =

Canadian utilities worker, farmer and politician

Ontario MPP
- In office 1990–1999
- Preceded by: Douglas Wiseman
- Succeeded by: Riding abolished
- Constituency: Lanark—Renfrew

Personal details
- Born: William Leo Jordan; December 29, 1929; Almonte, Ontario
- Died: February 15, 2015 (aged 85); Montague, Ontario
- Political party: Progressive Conservative
- Children: John Jordan
- Occupation: Farmer

William Leo Jordan (December 29, 1929 – February 15, 2015) was a politician in Ontario, Canada. He was a Progressive Conservative member of the Legislative Assembly of Ontario from 1990 to 1999.

== Background ==
Jordan studied Public Administration at Carleton University. He worked for thirty-nine years at Ontario Hydro, in the fields of operations, customer service, property and marketing. He was also a beef farmer, and served for a time as reeve of Montague Township and a member of the Lanark County council. He died on February 15, 2015.

== Politics ==
He was elected to the Ontario legislature in the 1990 provincial election, defeating Liberal Guin Persaud by about 1,500 votes in the riding of Lanark—Renfrew. This election was won by the Ontario New Democratic Party, and Jordan sat on the opposition benches for the next five years.

The PC party won the 1995 provincial election, in which Jordan defeated his Liberal opponent by more than 10,000 votes. In 1997 he was appointed as Parliamentary Assistant to the Minister of Economic Development, Trade and Tourism.

In 1996, the Harris government reduced the number of provincial ridings from 130 to 103. This meant that a number of sitting Members of Provincial Parliament MPPs had to compete against one another for re-election. Jordan ran against veteran Liberal MPP Sean Conway in the new riding of Renfrew—Nipissing—Pembroke in the 1999 provincial election, and lost by almost 6,000 votes.

In 2000, Jordan sought the federal Canadian Alliance nomination in Lanark—Carleton, but lost to Scott Reid.

== Personal life ==
His son John Jordan was elected MPP for Lanark—Frontenac—Kingston in the 2022 provincial election.

== Electoral record (partial) ==
1995 Ontario general election: Lanark—Renfrew
Party	Candidate	Votes	%	±%	Expenditures
Progressive Conservative	Leo Jordan	19,959	55.79		$39,952
Liberal	June Timmons	9,956	27.83	–	$35,655
New Democratic	Don Page	3,455	9.66		$8,809
Confederation of Regions	Murray Reid	867	2.42		$2,797
Family Coalition	Kilian O'Donovan	745	2.08	–	$3,251
Independent	Mike Dubroy	557	1.56		$6,162
Natural Law	Rick Alexander	237	0.66		$0
Total valid votes		35,776	100.00		
Rejected, unmarked and declined ballots		305			
Turnout		36,081			
Electors on the lists		60,270			

Sources: Official results, Elections Ontario and Financial statements, Elections Ontario.
