= Edward Walter Rathbun =

Canadian politician

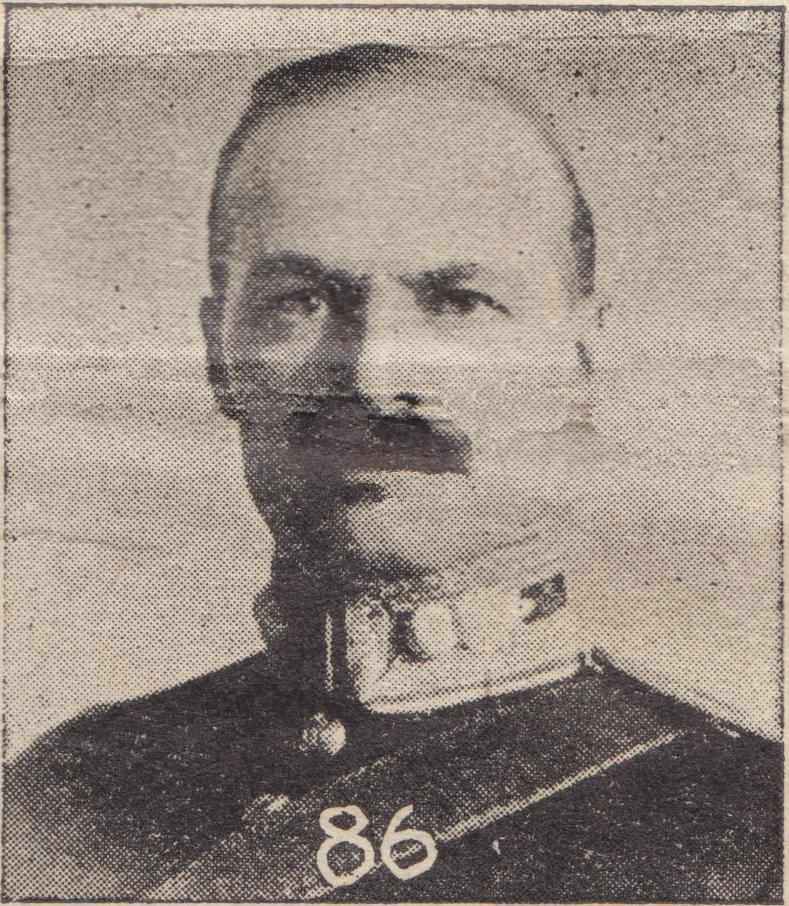

Ontario MPP
- In office 1905–1908
- Preceded by: Samuel Russell
- Succeeded by: Amos Augustus Richardson
- Constituency: Hastings East

Personal details
- Born: December 28, 1865 Deseronto, Province of Canada
- Died: September 6, 1940 (aged 74) Deseronto, Ontario
- Party: Independent-Liberal
- Spouse: Aileen Blair (m. 1893)
- Occupation: Businessman

Military service
- Allegiance: Canadian
- Branch/service: Royal Canadian Artillery, Canadian Forestry Corps
- Years of service: 1915-1918
- Rank: Lieutenant-Colonel

Edward Walter Rathbun (December 28, 1865 – September 6, 1940) was a business owner and politician in Ontario, Canada. He represented Hastings East in the Legislative Assembly of Ontario from 1905 to 1908 as an independent Liberal. From 1914, Rathbun was the mayor of Deseronto.

The son of Edward Wilkes Rathbun and Elizabeth How Burt, he was born in Deseronto. Rathbun took over the operation of the family lumber company following his father's death in 1903. The Rathbun Company also operated the Bay of Quinte Railway. Rathbun was lieutenant-colonel in the local militia and went overseas as the leader of a brigade in the Canadian Field Artillery in 1915. In 1916, he transferred to the Canadian Forestry Corps. Rathbun also served as mayor of Deseronto.

In 1893, Rathbun married Aileen Blair in England.

He died in Deseronto at the age of 74. He was cremated in Toronto and his ashes were sent to Nairn in Scotland for burial.
