= Wally Downer =

Canadian politician

Ontario MPP
- In office 1937–1975
- Preceded by: Wilfred Davy Smith
- Succeeded by: George McCague
- Constituency: Dufferin—Simcoe

Personal details
- Born: May 1, 1904 Penetanguishene, Ontario
- Died: August 3, 1994 (aged 90) Collingwood, Ontario
- Party: Progressive Conservative
- Spouse: Phyllis Palmer
- Children: 3
- Occupation: Anglican priest

Alfred Wallace Downer (May 1, 1904 – August 3, 1994) was a Canadian politician and longtime member of the Legislative Assembly of Ontario.

== Background ==
Downer was born near Penetanguishene in Simcoe County, Ontario. He was educated at Cookstown Continuation School, Alliston High School, the University of Toronto and Wycliffe College. After completing his schooling, he was ordained an Anglican priest. He was a vicar and then a canon in the Anglican Church of Canada and a member of the Conservative Party.

== Politics ==
He ran unsuccessfully in the provincial riding of Wellington Northeast in 1929 and then was first elected to the legislature as the member for Dufferin—Simcoe in the 1937 election. He served as Member of Provincial Parliament until 1975, winning a provincial record of ten consecutive elections.

While an elected MPP, he also served in the military during World War II, serving as chaplain of the Queen's York Rangers in North Africa and Europe. From 1955 until 1959, he served as Speaker of the legislative assembly. He also served as a liquor control commissioner beginning in 1960.

Downer was a candidate in the 1961 PC leadership convention, but was eliminated on the third ballot.

Downer had expected to run in the 1975 election and had expected to win his party's nomination by acclamation but was upset by another candidate, George McCague, at the Progressive Conservative nomination meeting.

In 1994, Downer died at the age of 90. in Collingwood, Ontario.
