= George Gomme =

Canadian politician

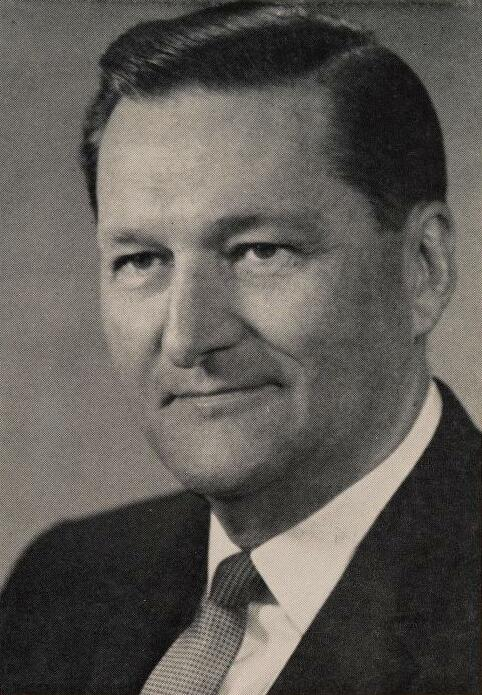

Ontario MPP
- In office 1958–1971
- Preceded by: John Arthur McCue
- Succeeded by: Douglas Jack Wiseman
- Constituency: Lanark

Personal details
- Born: January 16, 1912; London, England
- Died: March 3, 1996 (aged 84); Almonte, Ontario, Canada
- Political party: Progressive Conservative
- Occupation: Businessman
- Portfolio: Minister without portfolio, 1965–1966

George Ellis Gomme (January 16, 1912 – March 3, 1996) was a Canadian politician, who represented Lanark in the Legislative Assembly of Ontario from 1958 to 1971 as a Progressive Conservative member.

== Background ==
Gomme was born in London, England in 1912. He was the owner and operator of a local business, Almonte Lumber Store. Gomme was married to Rose Edith Watchorn (died 1991) and had two children, William George (Bill) and Jennifer.

== Politics ==
Gomme served as the mayor of Almonte, Ontario.

Gomme was elected in a by-election to replace John Arthur McCue who died after having served for only one year. He was re-elected in the general election of 1959 and 1963. He was appointed as a Minister without Portfolio on January 12, 1966, and then as Minister of Highways on November 24, 1966. A time of tremendous growth in Ontario, particularly in Toronto and surrounding suburbs, Gomme was actively involved in the development of new highways, such as Highway 410 in the Brampton area, as well as the expansion of other 400-series highways. He continued to serve as Minister of Highways until March 1, 1971. at which time he left Cabinet, having already announced that he would not be running in the 1971 general election. He died on March 3, 1996.

=== Cabinet posts ===
Ontario provincial government of John Robarts
Cabinet post (1)
Predecessor	Office	Successor
Charles MacNaughton	Minister of Highways; 1966–1971	Charles MacNaughton
