= Edward Wilkes Rathbun =

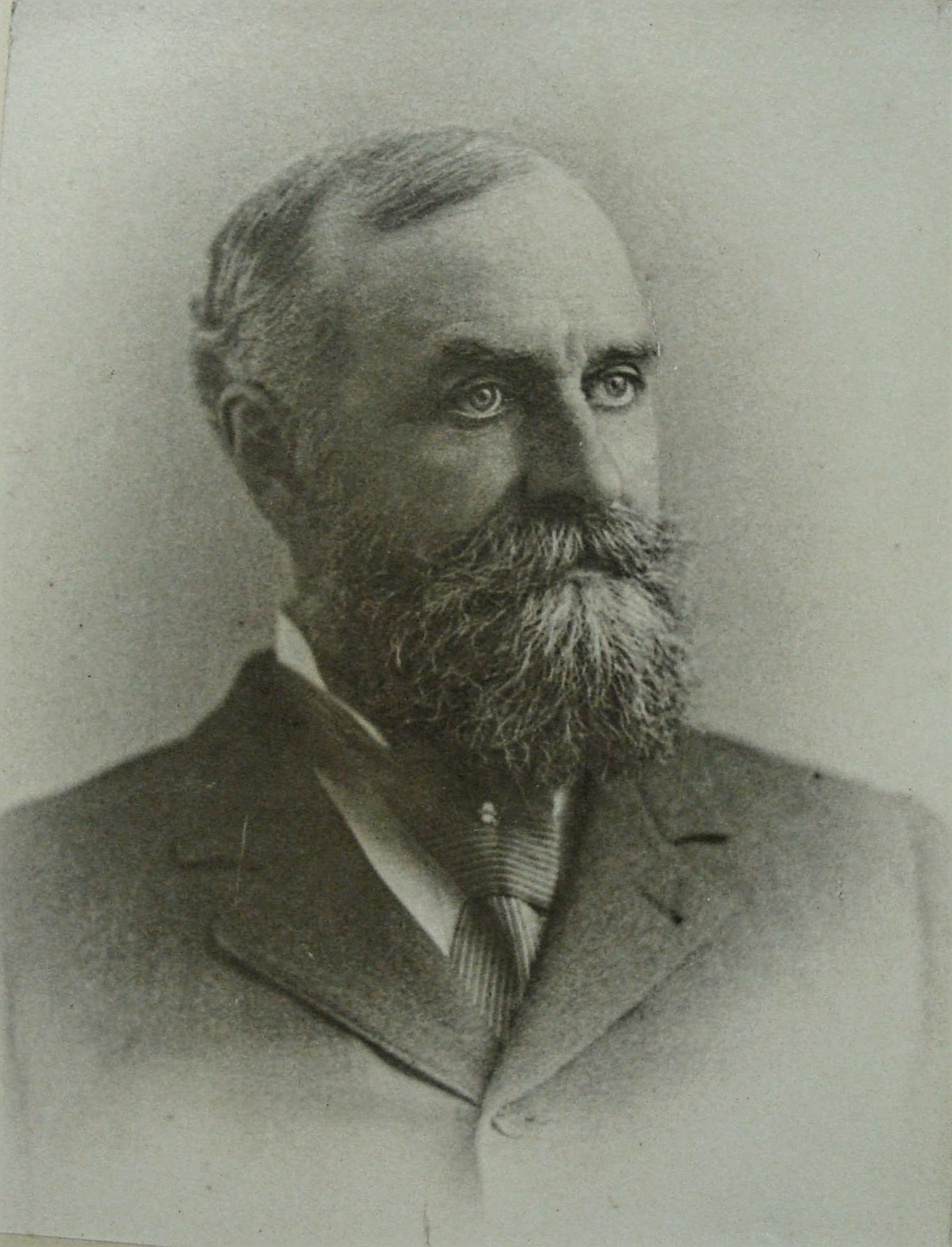
Edward Wilkes Rathbun, 1898

Edward Wilkes Rathbun (October 4, 1842 – November 24, 1903) was an American-born entrepreneur and political figure in Ontario, Canada.

The son of Hugo Burghardt Rathbun and Louisa Storm, he was born in Auburn, New York, was educated in New York City and worked for a trading company based in New York City. In 1862, Rathbun came to Mill Point (later Deseronto) in Canada West where his father had established a sawmill operation. In 1864, he became manager for his father's company. The sawmill was destroyed by fire in 1872 and a larger sawmill was built. The company could draw on 575 square miles (1489 km^{2}) of timber limits to produce lumber. Rathbun became president and general manager of the company in 1883; following the death of his father in 1886, he became sole owner. He had also expanded into other businesses: a shipyard, a flour mill, a cedar mill, a cement works, a steamship company and a sash, blind and door factory. The Deseronto Gas Works produced gas for lighting from the sawdust that was a by-product of the sawmill operation.

In 1883, he took over the Napanee, Tamworth and Quebec Railway to facilitate transportation of raw materials and manufactured goods; it was expanded to become the Bay of Quinte Railway. Rathbun also established a railway-car works, a terracotta plant, a wood-distillation works which produced charcoal and alcohol and an iron-smelting furnace. By 1900, Rathbun had become a millionaire.

Rathbun served as Deseronto mayor from 1889 until his death in 1903. The Rathbun company paid close to half of the municipal taxes in Deseronto; the family donated land for the town cemetery, concert hall, park and church. Although he never ran for provincial or federal office, Rathbun maintained close ties to powerful players in the governments of Ontario and Canada, such as Richard John Cartwright, Alexander Campbell and Oliver Mowat.

He was married twice: first to Elizabeth How Burt in 1863 and then to Bunella McMurrich, the daughter of John McMurrich, in 1873.

Rathbun died in Deseronto at the age of 61. His son Walter took over the operation of the company.
