= Rhéal Bélisle =

Canadian politician

The Honourable Rhéal Bélisle

Canadian Senator from Ontario
- In office 1963–1992
- Nominated by: John Diefenbaker
- Appointed by: Georges Vanier

Member of the Ontario Provincial Parliament for Nickel Belt
- In office 1955–1963
- Preceded by: New riding
- Succeeded by: Gaston Demers

Personal details
- Born: July 3, 1919
- Died: November 3, 1992 (aged 73) Sudbury, Ontario, Canada
- Party: Progressive Conservative
- Occupation: Farmer

Rhéal Bélisle (July 3, 1919 – November 3, 1992) was a Canadian politician in Ontario. He was a Progressive Conservative member of the Legislative Assembly of Ontario from 1955 to 1963 who represented the northern Ontario riding of Nickel Belt. From 1963 to 1992 he was a member of the Senate of Canada.

== Background ==
Born in Blezard Valley, Bélisle worked as a farmer and businessman before entering politics.

He left the provincial legislature in 1963, when he was appointed to the Senate of Canada by John Diefenbaker. He served in the Senate until his death in 1992. From 1991 until his death, he was speaker pro tempore of the Senate.
