= James Ferguson Hill =

Canadian politician

Ontario MPP
- In office 1923–1936
- Preceded by: Henry Ketcheson Denyes
- Succeeded by: Harold Edward Welsh
- Constituency: Hastings East

Personal details
- Born: November 5, 1871 Tyendinaga, Ontario
- Died: October 15, 1936 (aged 64) Toronto, Ontario
- Party: Conservative
- Spouse: Clara May Leslie (m. 1896)
- Occupation: Farmer

James Ferguson Hill (November 5, 1871 – October 15, 1936) was a farmer and politician in Ontario, Canada. He represented Hastings East in the Legislative Assembly of Ontario from 1923 to 1936 as a Conservative.

The son of Matthew Hill and Elizabeth Pegan, he was born in Shannonville and was educated in Deseronto and Belleville. In 1896, Hill married Clara May Leslie. He was a member of the Orange lodge.

Hill died in office at the age of 64.
