= John Arthur McCue =

Canadian politician

Ontario MPP
- In office 1957–1958
- Preceded by: George Doucett
- Succeeded by: George Gomme
- Constituency: Lanark

Personal details
- Born: September 17, 1912 Lanark County, Ontario
- Died: May 26, 1958 (aged 45) Lanark County, Ontario
- Party: Progressive Conservative
- Spouse: June
- Children: 4
- Profession: General practitioner

Military service
- Allegiance: Canadian
- Branch/service: Royal Canadian Army Medical Corps
- Years of service: 1939-1945
- Unit: 1st Field Ambulance

John Arthur McCue (September 17, 1912 - May 26, 1958) was a Canadian politician, who represented Lanark in the Legislative Assembly of Ontario from 1957 to 1958 as a Progressive Conservative member.

== Background ==
McCue was born in Lanark County, Ontario and received his medical training at Queen's University in Kingston, Ontario and then did postgraduate work in hospitals in Kingston, Cleveland, Ohio and New York City. In 1938, he returned to Smith's Falls where he established a private medical practice. In 1939, he joined the Royal Canadian Army Medical Corps and served overseas with the 1st Field Ambulance. Upon returning, after the war, he was active in a variety of medical associations, including serving as the President of the Smith's Falls and Lanark County Medical Association and Chairman of the Ontario Medical Association's General Practice Section.

On May 26, 1958, McCue was found dead in his bed at home. A note was found beside his bed saying that no person was involved in any way in taking his life nor was anyone to blame. He said in his note that he "simply could not carry on any longer." Death was attributed to a toxic drug overdose. He was married with four children.

== Politics ==
McCue was elected in a by-election to replace George Doucett who had resigned his provincial seat in order to run in a federal by-election in the riding. He defeated Liberal candidate Scott Burchell by a wide margin. McCue served as a backbench member of the Leslie Frost majority Progressive Conservative government.

He died, at age 45, only seven months after being elected, forcing another by-election, which was won by his successor as PC candidate, George Ellis Gomme.
