= Wilfred Davy Smith =

Canadian politician

Ontario MPP
- In office 1934–1937
- Preceded by: New riding
- Succeeded by: Wally Downer
- Constituency: Dufferin—Simcoe

Personal details
- Born: April 24, 1881 Oxford County, Ontario
- Died: September 16, 1942 (aged 61) Saint John, New Brunswick
- Party: Liberal
- Spouse: Dorothy Wolsely

Wilfred Davy Smith (April 24, 1881 – September 16, 1942) was a physician and politician in Ontario, Canada. He represented Dufferin—Simcoe in the Legislative Assembly of Ontario from 1934 to 1937 as a Liberal.

The son of William Davy Smith and Henrietta Rinch, both natives of England, he was born in East Oxford township and was educated in Woodstock and at Toronto University, In 1914, Smith married Dorothy Wolsely. He served as chair of the Board of Education for Creemore, Smith was also a Mason.

He died from a coronary thrombosis in Saint John, New Brunswick at the age of 61.
