= Moira, Ontario =

Coordinates: 44°21′30″N 77°24′18″W

Moira, Ontario is an unincorporated area in the municipality of Centre Hastings, Hastings County, Ontario, Canada. Moira is also the name of a signpost on the Canadian National Railway main line which passes through Hastings County, although it is not a passenger stop.

Moira is not a valid locality name for mail delivery. Canada Post's web site indicates that mail for at least some Moira addresses is handled through Roslin, Ontario.
