= Huron (electoral district) =

Electoral district in Midwestern Ontario, Canada

Ontario electoral district

Defunct federal electoral district
- Legislature: House of Commons
- District created: 1952
- District abolished: 1979
- First contested: 1953
- Last contested: 1974 (only contest as Huron–Middlesex)

Defunct provincial electoral district
- Legislature: Legislative Assembly of Ontario
- District created: 1933
- District abolished: 1996
- First contested: 1934 (1975 as Huron–Middlesex)
- Last contested: 1995

Demographics
- Census division(s): Huron, Middlesex

Huron, and later Huron–Middlesex, was an electoral district in Midwestern Ontario, Canada formerly represented in Canada's House of Commons and in the provincial Legislative Assembly of Ontario. Throughout both its federal and provincial existence, the district had within it the majority of Huron county's population, with the county's major population centres such as Goderich, Seaforth (now part of Huron East), Clinton (now part of Central Huron), and Exeter (now part of South Huron) in the district at all time. In the early 1970s, portions of Middlesex County were added to both the federal and provincial district, leading to the name change to Huron–Middlesex at both levels.

Upon the elimination of the federal district in 1979 and of the provincial district in 1996, both saw their territories absorbed by districts named Huron–Bruce. The nature of their transitions were however different. A Huron—Bruce (federal electoral district) had not previously existed, and thus was a bona fide successor district of the Huron/Huron–Middlesex federal electoral district. The Huron—Bruce (provincial electoral district) in the other hand was created at the same time as the Huron provincial district and had co-existed with Huron for more than five of Huron's six-decade existence, each returning a member to the 19th to 33rd Ontario parliaments.

== Members of Provincial Parliament ==
Huron
Assembly	Years	Member	Party
Electoral district created from Huron North and Bruce South
19th	1934–1937	James Simpson; Ballantyne	Liberal
20th	1937–1943	James Simpson; Ballantyne	Liberal
21st	1943–1945	Robert Hobbs Taylor	Progressive Conservative
22nd	1945–1948	Robert Hobbs Taylor	Progressive Conservative
23rd	1948–1951	Thomas Pryde	Progressive Conservative
24th	1951–1955	Thomas Pryde	Progressive Conservative
25th	1955–1958	Thomas Pryde	Progressive Conservative
25th	1958–1959	Charles MacNaughton	Progressive Conservative
26th	1959–1963	Charles MacNaughton	Progressive Conservative
27th	1963–1967	Charles MacNaughton	Progressive Conservative
28th	1967–1971	Charles MacNaughton	Progressive Conservative
29th	1973–1975	Jack Riddell	Liberal
Huron–Middlesex		Jack Riddell	Liberal
30th	1975–1977	Jack Riddell	Liberal
31st	1977–1981	Jack Riddell	Liberal
32nd	1981–1985	Jack Riddell	Liberal
33rd	1985–1987	Jack Riddell	Liberal
Huron		Jack Riddell	Liberal
34th	1987–1990	Jack Riddell	Liberal
35th	1990–1995	Paul Klopp	New Democratic
36th	1995–1999	Helen Johns	Progressive Conservative
Merged with Bruce to form Huron-Bruce

== Evolution of geography ==
=== Provincial ===
The Huron provincial electoral district was created by the Representation Act, 1933. Huron Country saw its representation reduced previously in 1925 from three to two seats. The 1933 redistribution further reduced its representation to one and a half seats through the elimination of Huron South and Huron North and the creation of the new Huron and Huron—Bruce electoral districts. The 1933 act divides the communities in Huron county as follows: (grouped by modern day municipalities created in 2001 as noted in brackets, for ease of reference only)

Huron:
- Goderich (now Goderich)
- Clinton and Hullett (now Central Huron)
- Hay, Stanley, Hensall (now Bluewater)
- Seaforth, McKillop, Tuckersmith (Huron East)
- Exeter, Stephen, Usborne (South Huron)
Huron—Bruce:
- Ashfield, Colborne, Wawanosh West (Ashfield–Colborne–Wawanosh)
- Howick (Howick)
- Morris, Turnberry (Morris-Turnberry)
- Brussels, Grey (Huron East)
- Blyth, Wawanosh East, Wingham (North Huron)
- plus other communities in Bruce County

The distribution of communities remained the same following the redistribution in 1954. The redistribution of 1966 specifically named two additional communities, Zurich and Bayfield (both now in Bluewater) in Huron, that were not mentioned before, but made no real change to the geography of these electoral district.

The 1975 redistribution brought substantive changes to the electoral district, adding various community form Middlexsex County to the district while transferring McKillop and Hullett away to Huron—Bruce The communities assigned to the two district after 1975 were as follows:

Huron-Middlesex
- Goderich
- Hay, Stanley, Hensall, Bayfield, Zurich (Bluewater)
- Exeter, Stephen, Usborne (South Huron)
- Seaforth, Tuckersmith (Huron East)
- Clinton (Central Huron)

(Communities in Middlsex)

- McGillivray, East Williams, West Williams, Parkhill, Ailsa Craig (North Middlesex)
- Adelaide (Adelaide-Metcalfe)
- Lucan, Biddulph (Lucan-Biddulph)
Huron-Bruce
- Ashfield, Colborne, Wawanosh West (Ashfield–Colborne–Wawanosh)
- Howick
- Morris, Turnberry (Morris-Turnberry)
- Brussels, Grey, McKillop (Huron East)
- Blyth, Wawanosh East, Wingham (North Huron)
- Hullett (Central Huron)
- plus other communities in Bruce County

(reassigned in 1975)

In 1986, Huron's representation was further reduced to a single seat. The provincial district of Huron–Bruce was eliminated and the electoral district name was reverted back to Huron with the entire country assigned to it.

The provincial electoral district of Huron was tagged for elimination in 1996 with the enactment of the Fewer Politicians Act, 1996, which prescribed the adoption of federal electoral boundary in a subsequent election. The Huron riding was slated to merge with neighbouring Bruce, leading to the head-to-head nomination battle between two Progressive Conservative MPPs, Huron's Helen Johns and Bruce's Barbara Fisher, from which Johns emerged as the winner.

=== Federal ===
The Huron federal electoral district had a relative shorter lifespan. It was created in 1952 by the federal Representation Act of 1952 with a vast majority of the Huron County, with only three communities being assigned to neighboring Wellington-Huron.

Huron
- Goderich
- Hullett (Central Huron)
- Grey, McKillop, Tuckersmith (Huron East)
- Hay, Stanley (Bluewater)
- Stephen, Usborne (South Huron)
- Morris (Morris-Turnberry)
- Ashfield, Colborne, West Wawanosh (Ashfield–Colborne–Wawanosh)
- East Wawanosh (North Huron)
- (plus Hibbert in Perth County)

Wellington-Huron

- Howick
- Turnberry (Morris-Turnberry)
- Wingham (North Huron)
- plus other communities in Wellington County

In 1966, the electoral district ridded of its small piece in Perth, gained almost all remaining Huron communities from Wellington–Huron, plus three communities from Middlesex County: Ailsa Craig, Biddulph and McGillivray.

Similar to what would occur to its provincial counterpart a year later, the federal electoral district was renamed Huron–Middlesex in 1974. Unlike its counterpart however, it gain no new territory. It was simply a delayed renaming to properly reflect the communities it had incorporated eight years earlier. The federal district was only contested under the new name Huron–Middlesex once in 1974.

In the 1976 round of redistribution, the electoral district was to revert back to be just Huron and was slated to stay the course with only minor adjustments. The 1976 Representation Order that was proclaimed in 1976 had it trade the three Middlesex communities for Carrick, Culross, Huron and Kinloss from Bruce County.

In July 1977 however, the brief existence of the federal district came abruptly to an end. An act of parliament with only one section was enacted for the sole purpose of changing its name from Huron to Huron—Bruce. It was one however, as eleven other electoral districts met the same fate.

== Sources ==
Boundaries definitions:

- Representation Act, 1933. Statutes of the Province of Ontario. Vol. 23 George V. 1933. c.56.
The Electoral District of Huron, — to consist of the Townships of Goderich, Hay, Hullett, McKillop, Stanley, Stephen, Tuckersmith and Usborne, the Towns of Clinton. Goderich and Seaforth, and the Villages of Exeter and Hensall.
The Electoral District of Huron-Bruce, — to consist of the Townships of Ashfield, Carrick, Colborne, Culross, Grey, Howick, Huron, Kinloss, Morris, Turnberry, Wawanosh East, Wawanosh West, the Town of Wingham, and the Villages of Blyth, Brussels, Lucknow, Mildmay, Ripley and Teeswater.
- Representation Act 1954. Statutes of the Province of Ontario. Vol. 3 Elizabeth. 1954. c.84.
The Electoral District of Huron — to consist of the townships of Goderich, Hay, Hullett, McKillop, Stanley, Stephen, Tuckersmith, and Usborne, the towns of Clinton, Exeter, Goderich, and Seaforth, and the Village of Hensall.
The Electoral District of Huron-Bruce — to consist of the townships of Ashfield, Carrick, Colborne, Culross, Grey, Howick, Huron, Kinloss, Morris, Turnberry, East Wawanosh, and West Wawanosh, the Town of W7ingham, and the villages of Blyth, Brussels, Lucknow, Mildmay, Ripley, and Teeswater.
- Representation Act, 1966. Statutes of the Province of Ontario. Vol. 14-15 Elizabeth. 1966. c.137.
The Electoral District of Huron — consists of the townships of Goderich, Hay, Hullett, McKillop, Stanley, Stephen, Tuckersmith and Usborne, the towns of Clinton, Exeter, Goderich and Seaforth, and the villages of Bayfield, Hensall and Zurich.
The Electoral District of Huron-Bruce — consists of the townships of Ashfield, Bruce, Carrick, Colborne, Culross, East Wawanosh, Greenock, Grey, Howick, Huron, Kincardine, Kinloss, Morris, Turnberry and West Wawanosh, the towns of Kincardine and Wingham, and the villages of Blyth, Brussels, Lucknow, Mildmay and Teeswater,
- Representation Act, 1975. Statutes of the Province of Ontario. Vol. 24 Elizabeth II. 1975. c.13.
The Electoral District of Huron-Bruce - to consist of the townships of Ashfield, Bruce, Carrick, Colborne, Culross, East Wawanosh, Greenock, Grey, Howick, Hullett, Huron, Kincardine, Kinloss, McKillop, Morris, Saugeen, Turnberry and West Wawanosh, the towns of Kincardine, Port Elgin, Southampton, and Wingham, and the villages of Blyth, Brussels, Lucknow, Mildmay, Ripley, Teeswater and Tiverton.
The Electoral District of Huron-Middlesex - to consist of the townships of Adelaide, Biddulph, East Williams, Goderich, Hay, McGillivray, Stanley, Stephen, Tuckersmith, Usborne and West Williams, the towns of Clinton, Exeter, Goderich, Parkhill and Seaforth, and the villages of Ailsa Craig, Bayfield, Hensall, Lucan and Zurich.
- Fewer Politicians Act, 1996. Annual Statutes of Ontario. Vol. SO 1996. 1996. c.28.

=== Federal ===
- The Representation Act, 1952. Statutes of Canada. Vol. 1 Elizabeth. 1952. c.48.
HURON consisting of that part of the county of Perth included in the township of Hibbert and that part of the county of Huron included in the townships of Hullett, McKillop, Stanley, Tuckersmith, Hay, Stephen, Usborne, Grey, Morris, Colborne, Goderich, Ashfield, East Wawanosh and West Wawanosh.
- Representation Order, 1966
HURON consisting of:
(a) the County of Huron excepting the Village of Lucknow;
(b) that part of the County of Middlesex contained in the Village of Ailsa Craig and the Townships of Biddulph and McGillivray.
- Representation Order, 1976
HURON consisting of:
(a) the County of Huron;
(b) that part of the County of Bruce contained in the Townships of Carrick, Culross, Huron and Kinloss.
- Electoral Boundaries Readjustment Act, 1974. Statutes of Canada. Vol. 23 Elizabeth II. 1974. c.7, schedule Paragraph 26.
Paragraph 26 of that Part of the Schedule to the Proclamation declaring the draft representation order under the Electoral Boundaries Readjustment Act to be in force, effective upon the dissolution of the 27th Parliament of Canada, dealing with the description of the electoral districts in the Province of Ontario, which describes the electoral district of Huron, is amended by substituting for the word: "HURON", the words: "HURON-MIDDLESEX" at the beginning of the said description.
- An Act to amend the Electoral Boundaries Readjustment Act (Huron-Bruce). Statutes of Canada. Vol. 25-26 Elizabeth II. 1977. c.44.
s.1 Paragraph 33 of the Part of the Schedule to the Proclamation of June 11, 1976 declaring the draft representation order under the Electoral Boundaries Readjustment Act in force effective upon the first dissolution of Parliament that occurs at least one year after the day on which the Proclamation is made dealing with the electoral districts in the Province of Ontario, which paragraph names and describes the electoral district of Huron, is amended by substituting for the name "HURON", the name "HURON-BRUCE" at the beginning of the paragraph.
