= Huron (provincial electoral district) =

Electoral district in Midwestern Ontario, Canada

Ontario electoral district

Defunct provincial electoral district
- Legislature: Legislative Assembly of Ontario
- District created: 1933
- District abolished: 1996
- First contested: 1934 (1975 as Huron–Middlesex)
- Last contested: 1995

Demographics
- Census division(s): Huron, Middlesex

Huron, and later Huron–Middlesex, was an electoral district in Midwestern Ontario, Canada formerly represented in the provincial Legislative Assembly of Ontario. Throughout both its provincial existence, the district had within it the majority of Huron county's population, with the county's major population centres such as Goderich, Seaforth (now part of Huron East), Clinton (now part of Central Huron), and Exeter (now part of South Huron) in the district at all time. In the early 1970s, portions of Middlesex County were added to both the federal and provincial district, leading to the name change to Huron–Middlesex at both levels.

Upon the elimination of the district in 1996 it was absorbed by districts named Huron–Bruce. The Huron—Bruce (provincial electoral district) in the other hand was created at the same time as the Huron provincial district and had co-existed with Huron for more than five of Huron's six-decade existence, each returning a member to the 19th to 33rd Ontario parliaments.

== Members of Provincial Parliament ==
Huron
Assembly	Years	Member	Party
Electoral district created from Huron North and Bruce South
19th	1934–1937	James Simpson; Ballantyne	Liberal
20th	1937–1943	James Simpson; Ballantyne	Liberal
21st	1943–1945	Robert Hobbs Taylor	Progressive Conservative
22nd	1945–1948	Robert Hobbs Taylor	Progressive Conservative
23rd	1948–1951	Thomas Pryde	Progressive Conservative
24th	1951–1955	Thomas Pryde	Progressive Conservative
25th	1955–1958	Thomas Pryde	Progressive Conservative
25th	1958–1959	Charles MacNaughton	Progressive Conservative
26th	1959–1963	Charles MacNaughton	Progressive Conservative
27th	1963–1967	Charles MacNaughton	Progressive Conservative
28th	1967–1971	Charles MacNaughton	Progressive Conservative
29th	1973–1975	Jack Riddell	Liberal
Huron–Middlesex		Jack Riddell	Liberal
30th	1975–1977	Jack Riddell	Liberal
31st	1977–1981	Jack Riddell	Liberal
32nd	1981–1985	Jack Riddell	Liberal
33rd	1985–1987	Jack Riddell	Liberal
Huron		Jack Riddell	Liberal
34th	1987–1990	Jack Riddell	Liberal
35th	1990–1995	Paul Klopp	New Democratic
36th	1995–1999	Helen Johns	Progressive Conservative
Merged with Bruce to form Huron-Bruce

== Evolution of geography ==
=== Provincial ===
The Huron provincial electoral district was created by the Representation Act, 1933. Huron Country saw its representation reduced previously in 1925 from three to two seats. The 1933 redistribution further reduced its representation to one and a half seats through the elimination of Huron South and Huron North and the creation of the new Huron and Huron—Bruce electoral districts. The 1933 act divides the communities in Huron county as follows: (grouped by modern day municipalities created in 2001 as noted in brackets, for ease of reference only)

Huron:
- Goderich (now Goderich)
- Clinton and Hullett (now Central Huron)
- Hay, Stanley, Hensall (now Bluewater)
- Seaforth, McKillop, Tuckersmith (Huron East)
- Exeter, Stephen, Usborne (South Huron)
Huron—Bruce:
- Ashfield, Colborne, Wawanosh West (Ashfield–Colborne–Wawanosh)
- Howick (Howick)
- Morris, Turnberry (Morris-Turnberry)
- Brussels, Grey (Huron East)
- Blyth, Wawanosh East, Wingham (North Huron)
- plus other communities in Bruce County

The distribution of communities remained the same following the redistribution in 1954. The redistribution of 1966 specifically named two additional communities, Zurich and Bayfield (both now in Bluewater) in Huron, that were not mentioned before, but made no real change to the geography of these electoral district.

The 1975 redistribution brought substantive changes to the electoral district, adding various community form Middlexsex County to the district while transferring McKillop and Hullett away to Huron—Bruce The communities assigned to the two district after 1975 were as follows:

Huron-Middlesex
- Goderich
- Hay, Stanley, Hensall, Bayfield, Zurich (Bluewater)
- Exeter, Stephen, Usborne (South Huron)
- Seaforth, Tuckersmith (Huron East)
- Clinton (Central Huron)

(Communities in Middlsex)

- McGillivray, East Williams, West Williams, Parkhill, Ailsa Craig (North Middlesex)
- Adelaide (Adelaide-Metcalfe)
- Lucan, Biddulph (Lucan-Biddulph)
Huron-Bruce
- Ashfield, Colborne, Wawanosh West (Ashfield–Colborne–Wawanosh)
- Howick
- Morris, Turnberry (Morris-Turnberry)
- Brussels, Grey, McKillop (Huron East)
- Blyth, Wawanosh East, Wingham (North Huron)
- Hullett (Central Huron)
- plus other communities in Bruce County

(reassigned in 1975)

In 1986, Huron's representation was further reduced to a single seat. The provincial district of Huron–Bruce was eliminated and the electoral district name was reverted back to Huron with the entire country assigned to it.

The provincial electoral district of Huron was tagged for elimination in 1996 with the enactment of the Fewer Politicians Act, 1996, which prescribed the adoption of federal electoral boundary in a subsequent election. The Huron riding was slated to merge with neighbouring Bruce, leading to the head-to-head nomination battle between two Progressive Conservative MPPs, Huron's Helen Johns and Bruce's Barbara Fisher, from which Johns emerged as the winner.

== Election results ==
=== Huron (1987–1999) ===
1995 Ontario general election
Party	Candidate	Votes	%	±%
Progressive Conservative	Helen Johns	13,343	46.16	+14.98
Liberal	John Jewitt	7,009	24.25	+1.36
New Democratic	Paul Klopp	6,927	23.97	–10.50
Family Coalition	Phil Cornish	1,418	4.91	–5.18
Independent	Kimble F. Ainslie	207	0.72	–
Total valid votes		28,904	99.38	
Total rejected, unmarked and declined ballots		180	0.62	–0.13
Turnout		29,084	70.00	–1.47
Eligible voters		41,549		
Progressive Conservative gain from New Democratic		Swing		+12.74
Source: Elections Ontario

1990 Ontario general election
Party	Candidate	Votes	%	±%
New Democratic	Paul Klopp	10,020	34.47	+20.06
Progressive Conservative	Kenneth Campbell	9,066	31.19	+5.97
Liberal	Jim Fitzgerald	6,653	22.89	–37.49
Family Coalition	Tom Clark	2,931	10.08	–
Libertarian	Allan R. Dettweiler	400	1.38	–
Total valid votes		29,070	99.25	
Total rejected, unmarked and declined ballots		219	0.75	+0.15
Turnout		29,289	71.47	+3.97
Eligible voters		40,979		
New Democratic gain from Liberal		Swing		+28.78
Source: Elections Ontario

1987 Ontario general election
Party	Candidate	Votes	%	±%
Liberal	Jack Riddell	16,099	60.38	–
Progressive Conservative	Nico Peters	6,725	25.22	–
New Democratic	Paul Klopp	3,841	14.40	–
Total valid votes		26,665	99.40	
Total rejected ballots		160	0.60	–
Turnout		26,825	67.51	–
Eligible voters		39,736		
Liberal hold		Swing		–
Source: Elections Ontario

=== Huron–Middlesex (1975–1987) ===
1985 Ontario general election: Huron—Middlesex
Party	Candidate	Votes	%	±%
Liberal	Jack Riddell	13,820	61.21	+8.97
Progressive Conservative	Bryan Smith	7,381	32.69	–9.36
New Democratic	Paul Klopp	1,148	5.08	–0.62
Independent	Carman J. Dawson	229	1.01	–
Total valid votes		22,578	99.70	
Total rejected ballots		68	0.30	–0.04
Turnout		22,646	70.67	+4.17
Eligible voters		32,045		
Liberal hold		Swing		+9.16
Source: Elections Ontario

1981 Ontario general election: Huron—Middlesex
Party	Candidate	Votes	%	±%
Liberal	Jack Riddell	10,707	52.24	–3.11
Progressive Conservative	Jim Britnell	8,618	42.05	+3.50
New Democratic	Gwen Pemberton	1,170	5.71	–0.39
Total valid votes		20,495	99.65	
Total rejected ballots		71	0.35	+0.06
Turnout		20,566	66.50	–10.16
Eligible voters		30,927		
Liberal hold		Swing		–3.31
Source: Elections Ontario

1977 Ontario general election: Huron—Middlesex
Party	Candidate	Votes	%	±%
Liberal	Jack Riddell	12,749	55.35	+1.32
Progressive Conservative	Anson McKinley	8,878	38.55	+1.75
New Democratic	Shirley M. Weary	1,405	6.10	–3.07
Total valid votes		23,032	99.72	
Total rejected ballots		65	0.28	–0.04
Turnout		23,097	76.66	+0.60
Eligible voters		30,130		
Liberal hold		Swing		–0.22
Source: Elections Ontario

1975 Ontario general election: Huron—Middlesex
Party	Candidate	Votes	%	±%
Liberal	Jack Riddell	11,893	54.04	+0.46
Progressive Conservative	Jim Hayter	8,098	36.79	–1.17
New Democratic	Paul Carroll	2,018	9.17	–1.41
Total valid votes		22,009	99.67	
Total rejected ballots		72	0.33	–
Turnout		22,081	76.06	–
Eligible voters		29,030		
Liberal notional hold		Swing		+0.82
Source: Elections Ontario

=== Huron (1934–1975) ===
Ontario provincial by-election, March 15, 1973 Resignation of Charles MacNaughton
Party	Candidate	Votes	%	±%
Liberal	Jack Riddell	8,855	53.58	+32.10
Progressive Conservative	Donald Southcott	5,888	35.62	–22.19
New Democratic	Paul Carroll	1,749	10.58	–9.57
Socialist	Edward Bain	36	0.22	–0.34
Total valid votes		16,528	99.75	
Total rejected ballots		42	0.25	–0.16
Turnout		16,570	–	–
Eligible voters				
Liberal gain from Progressive Conservative		Swing		+27.14
Source: Elections Ontario

1971 Ontario general election
Party	Candidate	Votes	%	±%
Progressive Conservative	Charles MacNaughton	9,793	57.81	–4.38
Liberal	Ken Duncan	3,638	21.48	–6.33
New Democratic	Paul Carroll	3,414	20.15	+10.15
Independent	Edward Bain	94	0.55	–
Total valid votes		16,939	99.59	
Total rejected ballots		70	0.41	–0.21
Turnout		17,009	78.11	+6.08
Eligible voters		21,775		
Progressive Conservative hold		Swing		+0.97
Source: Elections Ontario

1967 Ontario general election
Party	Candidate	Votes	%	±%
Progressive Conservative	Charles MacNaughton	8,353	62.20	–5.52
Liberal	Morgan Smith	3,734	27.80	–4.48
New Democratic	John Boyne	1,343	10.00	–
Total valid votes		13,430	99.38	
Total rejected ballots		84	0.62	–0.02
Turnout		13,514	72.03	+2.60
Eligible voters		18,762		
Progressive Conservative hold		Swing		–0.52
Source: Elections Ontario

1963 Ontario general election
Party	Candidate	Votes	%	±%
Progressive Conservative	Charles MacNaughton	8,931	67.72	+11.88
Liberal	Harry Strang	4,257	32.28	–11.88
Total valid votes		13,188	99.36	
Total rejected ballots		85	0.64	–0.06
Turnout		13,273	69.43	–6.91
Eligible voters		19,118		
Progressive Conservative hold		Swing		+11.88
Source: Elections Ontario

1959 Ontario general election
Party	Candidate	Votes	%	±%
Progressive Conservative	Charles MacNaughton	7,759	55.84	+1.27
Liberal	Harry Strang	6,135	44.16	–1.27
Total valid votes		13,894	99.30	
Total rejected ballots		98	0.70	+0.01
Turnout		13,992	76.34	+8.34
Eligible voters		18,329		
Progressive Conservative hold		Swing		+1.27
Source: Elections Ontario

Ontario provincial by-election, May 12, 1958 Death of Thomas Pryde
Party	Candidate	Votes	%	±%
Progressive Conservative	Charles MacNaughton	6,947	54.58	–0.70
Liberal	J.A. Addison	5,782	45.42	+0.70
Total valid votes		12,729	99.31	
Total rejected ballots		88	0.69	–0.13
Turnout		12,817	68.00	–11.31
Eligible voters		18,849		
Progressive Conservative hold		Swing		–0.70
Source: Elections Ontario

1955 Ontario general election
Party	Candidate	Votes	%	±%
Progressive Conservative	Thomas Pryde	7,890	55.27	+0.39
Liberal	James R. Scott	6,385	44.73	–0.39
Total valid votes		14,275	99.18	
Total rejected ballots		118	0.82	–0.08
Turnout		14,393	79.31	–1.31
Eligible voters		18,148		
Progressive Conservative hold		Swing		+0.39
Source: Elections Ontario

1951 Ontario general election
Party	Candidate	Votes	%	±%
Progressive Conservative	Thomas Pryde	8,005	54.88	+4.53
Liberal	John W. Armstrong	6,581	45.12	–4.53
Total valid votes		14,586	99.10	
Total rejected ballots		132	0.90	+0.38
Turnout		14,718	80.62	+5.27
Eligible voters		18,257		
Progressive Conservative hold		Swing		+4.53
Source: Elections Ontario

1948 Ontario general election
Party	Candidate	Votes	%	±%
Progressive Conservative	Thomas Pryde	7,566	50.35	–1.89
Liberal	Frank Fingland	7,460	49.65	+1.89
Total valid votes		15,026	99.48	
Total rejected ballots		78	0.52	+0.52
Turnout		15,104	75.35	–
Eligible voters		20,045		
Progressive Conservative hold		Swing		–1.89
Source: Elections Ontario

Ontario provincial by-election, February 16, 1948 Death of Robert Hobbs Taylor
Party	Candidate	Votes	%	±%
Progressive Conservative	Thomas Pryde	7,615	52.24	–0.43
Liberal	Benson Tuckey	6,961	47.76	+9.43
Total valid votes		14,576	100.00	
Total rejected ballots		–		
Turnout		14,576	–	–
Eligible voters				
Progressive Conservative hold		Swing		–4.93
Source: Elections Ontario

1945 Ontario general election
Party	Candidate	Votes	%	±%
Progressive Conservative	Robert Hobbs Taylor	7,081	52.67	+8.67
Liberal	James Simpson Ballantyne	5,152	38.32	–1.45
Co-operative Commonwealth	John E. Huckins	1,211	9.01	–7.22
Total valid votes		13,444	99.43	
Total rejected ballots		77	0.57	+0.24
Turnout		13,521	74.01	+10.96
Eligible voters		18,269		
Progressive Conservative hold		Swing		+5.06
Source: Elections Ontario

1943 Ontario general election
Party	Candidate	Votes	%	±%
Progressive Conservative	Robert Hobbs Taylor	4,889	44.00	+1.66
Liberal	Benson W. Tuckey	4,419	39.77	–11.09
Co-operative Commonwealth	W. C. Oestricher	1,803	16.23	–
Total valid votes		11,111	99.67	
Total rejected ballots		37	0.33	–0.39
Turnout		11,148	63.05	–13.36
Eligible voters		17,680		
Progressive Conservative gain from Liberal		Swing		+6.38
Source: Elections Ontario

1937 Ontario general election
Party	Candidate	Votes	%	±%
Liberal	James Simpson Ballantyne	7,042	50.86	–6.66
Conservative	Robert Hobbs Taylor	5,862	42.34	+0.71
Independent	Alexander Moir	942	6.80	–
Total valid votes		13,846	99.28	
Total rejected ballots		101	0.72	+0.09
Turnout		13,947	76.42	–2.44
Eligible voters		18,251		
Liberal hold		Swing		–3.69
Source: Elections Ontario

1934 Ontario general election
Party	Candidate	Votes	%
Liberal	James Simpson Ballantyne	8,254	57.52
Conservative	George Henry Elliott	5,973	41.63
Independent	William W. Cooper	122	0.85
Total valid votes		14,349	99.36
Total rejected ballots		92	0.64
Turnout		14,441	78.86
Eligible voters		18,312	
Liberal pickup new district.			
Source: Elections Ontario

== Sources ==
Boundaries definitions:

- Representation Act, 1933. Statutes of the Province of Ontario. Vol. 23 George V. 1933. c.56.
The Electoral District of Huron, — to consist of the Townships of Goderich, Hay, Hullett, McKillop, Stanley, Stephen, Tuckersmith and Usborne, the Towns of Clinton. Goderich and Seaforth, and the Villages of Exeter and Hensall.
The Electoral District of Huron-Bruce, — to consist of the Townships of Ashfield, Carrick, Colborne, Culross, Grey, Howick, Huron, Kinloss, Morris, Turnberry, Wawanosh East, Wawanosh West, the Town of Wingham, and the Villages of Blyth, Brussels, Lucknow, Mildmay, Ripley and Teeswater.
- Representation Act 1954. Statutes of the Province of Ontario. Vol. 3 Elizabeth. 1954. c.84.
The Electoral District of Huron — to consist of the townships of Goderich, Hay, Hullett, McKillop, Stanley, Stephen, Tuckersmith, and Usborne, the towns of Clinton, Exeter, Goderich, and Seaforth, and the Village of Hensall.
The Electoral District of Huron-Bruce — to consist of the townships of Ashfield, Carrick, Colborne, Culross, Grey, Howick, Huron, Kinloss, Morris, Turnberry, East Wawanosh, and West Wawanosh, the Town of W7ingham, and the villages of Blyth, Brussels, Lucknow, Mildmay, Ripley, and Teeswater.
- Representation Act, 1966. Statutes of the Province of Ontario. Vol. 14-15 Elizabeth. 1966. c.137.
The Electoral District of Huron — consists of the townships of Goderich, Hay, Hullett, McKillop, Stanley, Stephen, Tuckersmith and Usborne, the towns of Clinton, Exeter, Goderich and Seaforth, and the villages of Bayfield, Hensall and Zurich.
The Electoral District of Huron-Bruce — consists of the townships of Ashfield, Bruce, Carrick, Colborne, Culross, East Wawanosh, Greenock, Grey, Howick, Huron, Kincardine, Kinloss, Morris, Turnberry and West Wawanosh, the towns of Kincardine and Wingham, and the villages of Blyth, Brussels, Lucknow, Mildmay and Teeswater,
- Representation Act, 1975. Statutes of the Province of Ontario. Vol. 24 Elizabeth II. 1975. c.13.
The Electoral District of Huron-Bruce - to consist of the townships of Ashfield, Bruce, Carrick, Colborne, Culross, East Wawanosh, Greenock, Grey, Howick, Hullett, Huron, Kincardine, Kinloss, McKillop, Morris, Saugeen, Turnberry and West Wawanosh, the towns of Kincardine, Port Elgin, Southampton, and Wingham, and the villages of Blyth, Brussels, Lucknow, Mildmay, Ripley, Teeswater and Tiverton.
The Electoral District of Huron-Middlesex - to consist of the townships of Adelaide, Biddulph, East Williams, Goderich, Hay, McGillivray, Stanley, Stephen, Tuckersmith, Usborne and West Williams, the towns of Clinton, Exeter, Goderich, Parkhill and Seaforth, and the villages of Ailsa Craig, Bayfield, Hensall, Lucan and Zurich.
- Fewer Politicians Act, 1996. Annual Statutes of Ontario. Vol. SO 1996. 1996. c.28.
