= Ontario New Democratic Party candidates in the 1985 Ontario provincial election =

The New Democratic Party of Ontario ran a full slate of candidates in the 1985 Ontario provincial election, and won 25 out of 130 seats to become the third-largest party in the legislature. Many of the party's candidates have their own biography pages; information on others may be found here.

== Central Ontario ==
Riding	Candidate's Name	Notes	Residence	Occupation	Votes	%	Rank
Dufferin—Simcoe	Goetz Koechlin				4,316		3rd
Hastings—Peterborough	Elmer Buchanan				4,492		3rd
Muskoka–Georgian Bay	Robert Maguire				2,836		3rd
Northumberland	Judi Armstrong				3,247		3rd
Peterborough	Linda Slavin				11,941		2nd
Simcoe Centre	Paul Wessenger			Lawyer	9,639		3rd
Simcoe East	Fayne Bullen				11,002		2nd
Victoria—Haliburton	Arthur Field				3,209		3rd

== Eastern Ontario/Ottawa ==
Riding	Candidate's Name	Notes	Residence	Occupation	Votes	%	Rank
Carleton	Beatrice Murray				7,165		3rd
Carleton East	Joan Gullen				8,829		3rd
Cornwall	Stephen Corrie				5,828		3rd
Frontenac—Addington	Lars Thompson				3,723		3rd
Kingston and the Islands	Pamela Cross				3,892		3rd
Lanark	Donald Page				3,297		3rd
Leeds	Robert Smith				3,583		3rd
Ottawa Centre	Evelyn Gigantes	Member of Provincial Parliament for Carleton East (1975–1981)		Radio/television broadcaster	11,890		1st
Ottawa East	Kathryn Barnard				3,971		2nd
Ottawa South	John Smart				8,311		3rd
Ottawa West	Gregory Ross				4,427		3rd
Prescott and Russell	Maurice Landry				2,625		3rd
Prince Edward—Lennox	Henry Plummer				2,307		3rd
Quinte	Eugene Morosan				1,817		3rd
Renfrew North	Robert Cottingham				740		3rd
Renfrew South	Frederick Theilheimer				3,420		3rd
Stormont, Dundas, and Glengarry	Ruediger Derstroff				1,700		3rd

== Greater Toronto Area ==
Riding	Candidate's Name	Notes	Residence	Occupation	Votes	%	Rank
Armourdale	Robert Hebdon				5,429		3rd
Beaches—Woodbine	Marion Bryden	Member of Provincial Parliament for Beaches—Woodbine (1975–1990)		Researcher/statistician	12,672		1st
Bellwoods	Ross McClellan	Member of Provincial Parliament for Bellwoods (1975–1987)		Social worker	8,088		1st
Brampton	Terence Gorman				8,313		3rd
Burlington South	Walter Mulkewich				10,820		3rd
Don Mills	Michael Wyatt				6,153		3rd
Dovercourt	Tony Lupusella	Member of Provincial Parliament for Dovercourt (1975–1990)			6,677		2nd
Downsview	Odoardo Di Santo	Member of Provincial Parliament for Downsview (1975–1985)		Paralegal	11,013		2nd
Durham East	Douglas Smith				9,832		2nd
Durham West	Donald Stewart				8,495		3rd
Durham—York	Margaret Wilbur				5,440		3rd
Eglinton	John Goodfellow				4,880		3rd
Etobicoke	Ed Philip	Member of Provincial Parliament for Etobicoke (1975–1987)	Rexdale, Toronto		16,792		1st
Halton—Burlington	Douglas Hamilton				4,871		3rd
High Park—Swansea	Elaine Ziemba				9,630		2nd
Humber	Peter Sutherland				5,160		3rd
Lakeshore	Ruth Grier	Member of Etobicoke City Council for Mimico (1969–1985)			11,539		1st
Mississauga East	Larry Taylor				12,015		3rd
Mississauga North	Sylvia Weylie				9,943		3rd
Mississauga South	Barry Stevens				4,770		3rd
Oakville	Kevin Flynn				4,390		3rd
Oakwood	Tony Grande	Member of Provincial Parliament for Oakwood (1975–1987)		Teacher	10,407		1st
Oriole	Lorne Strachan				3,660		3rd
Oshawa	Michael Breaugh	Member of Provincial Parliament for Oshawa (1975–1990)		Teacher	12,686		1st
Parkdale	Richard Gilbert				5,136		2nd
Riverdale	David Reville	Member of Toronto City Council for Ward 7 (1980–1985)			9,869		1st
Scarborough Centre	Sydney Christensen				7,577		3rd
Scarborough East	Alawi Mohideen				4,381		3rd
Scarborough—Ellesmere	David Warner	Member of Provincial Parliament for Scarborough—Ellesmere (1975–1981)		Teacher	10,119		1st
Scarborough North	Jerry Daca				9,072		3rd
Scarborough West	Richard Johnston	Member of Provincial Parliament for Scarborough West (1979–1990)		Social worker	12,889		1st
St. Andrew—St. Patrick	Margaret Griffiths				8,373		2nd
St. David	Barbara Hall				4,878		3rd
St. George	Diana Hunt				10,543		2nd
Wilson Heights	Howard Moscoe	Member of North York City Council for Ward 4 (1978–1985)	Toronto	Teacher	7,793		3rd
York East	Gordon Crann				9,183		2nd
York Mills	Gordon Doctorow				6,872		3rd
York South	Bob Rae	Leader of the Ontario New Democratic Party (1982–1996); Member of Provincial Parliament for York South (1982–1996); Member of Parliament for Broadview–Greenwood (1978–1982); Member of Parliament for Broadview (1978–1979)		Lawyer	16,373		1st
York West	Philip Jones				6,930		3rd
Yorkview	Michael Foster				12,658		2nd

== Hamilton/Niagara ==
Riding	Candidate's Name	Notes	Residence	Occupation	Votes	%	Rank
Brock	Robert Woolston				3,867		3rd
Erie	Shirley Summers				3,191		3rd
Hamilton Centre	Michael Davison				8,800		2nd
Hamilton East	Robert W. Mackenzie	Member of Provincial Parliament for Hamilton East (1975–1995)		Union leader (United Steelworkers)	13,774		1st
Hamilton Mountain	Brian Charlton	Member of Provincial Parliament for Hamilton Mountain (1977–1995)	Hamilton	Property assessor	13,871		1st
Hamilton West	Richard Allen	Member of Provincial Parliament for Hamilton West (1982–1995)	Dundas	Professor at McMaster University	10,182		1st
Lincoln	Barbara Mersereau				2,264		3rd
Niagara Falls	Deloris Skilton				6,778		3rd
St. Catharines	Michael Cormier			Lawyer/Professor at the University of Western Ontario	5,624		3rd
Welland–Thorold	Mel Swart	Member of Provincial Parliament for Welland–Thorold (1977–1988); Member of Provincial Parliament for Welland (1975–1977); Mayor of Thorold (1955–1965); Member of Thorold Town Council (1948–1954)			17,065		1st
Wentworth	Sharon Lehnert				8,571		2nd
Wentworth North	Linda Spencer				6,158		3rd

== Northern Ontario ==
Riding	Candidate's Name	Notes	Residence	Occupation	Votes	%	Rank
Algoma	Bud Wildman	Member of Provincial Parliament for Algoma (1975–1999)	Echo Bay	Teacher	7,575		1st
Algoma—Manitoulin	Leonard Hembruff				3,309		3rd
Cochrane North	Andre-Maurice Philippe				2,878		3rd
Cochrane South	Roger Loiselle				5,662		2nd
Fort William	Donald Smith				7,071		2nd
Kenora	Colin Wasacase				4,025		2nd
Lake Nipigon	Gilles Pouliot	Mayor of Manitouwadge	Manitouwadge	Miner	5,708		1st
Nickel Belt	Floyd Laughren	Member of Provincial Parliament for Nickel Belt (1971–1998)	Sudbury	Professor at Cambrian College	8,912		1st
Nipissing	Lynne Bennett				3,984		3rd
Parry Sound	Leo Gagne				1,130		3rd
Port Arthur	Jim Foulds	Member of Provincial Parliament for Port Arthur (1971–1987)		Teacher	13,084		1st
Rainy River	Howard Hampton			Lawyer	4,775		2nd
Sault Ste. Marie	Karl Morin-Strom			Financial analyst	16,362		1st
Sudbury	Ernest St. Jean				7,010		2nd
Sudbury East	Elie Martel	Member of Provincial Parliament for Sudbury East (1967–1987)	Sudbury	Teacher	17,241		1st
Timiskaming	David Ramsay		Belle Vallée	Farmer	10,765		1st

== Southwestern Ontario ==
Riding	Candidate's Name	Notes	Residence	Occupation	Votes	%	Rank
Brant—Oxford—Norfolk	Irene Heltner				3,487		3rd
Brantford	Jack Tubman	Candidate for Brantford City Council (Ward 3) in the 1974 Brantford municipal election	Brantford	President of the Canadian Auto Workers Local 397	12,303		2nd
Cambridge	Alexander Dufresne				11,985		2nd
Chatham—Kent	Ronald Franko				5,535		3rd
Elgin	James Campbell				5,315		3rd
Essex North	Pat Hayes			Work safety professional/Union official (CAW)	7,901		1st
Essex South	Paul Hertel				2,677		4th
Grey	Rhonda Green				2,402		3rd
Grey–Bruce	Jo-Anne Shaw				2,340		3rd
Haldimand—Norfolk	Wayne Pierce				3,821		3rd
Huron–Bruce	Norma Peterson				1,992		3rd
Huron–Middlesex	Paul Klopp		Bluewater	Farmer	1,148		3rd
Kent–Elgin	Donald Alexander				1,916		3rd
Kitchener	Timothy Little				5,654		3rd
Kitchener—Wilmot	Mike Cooper			Rubber worker	4,673		3rd
Lambton	Grant Reynolds				1,987		3rd
London Centre	Peter Cassidy				4,340		3rd
London North	Marion Boyd		London		5,191		3rd
London South	David Winninger			Lawyer	5,080		3rd
Middlesex	Larry Green				2,169		3rd
Oxford	Wayne Colbran				5,660		3rd
Perth	Warren Ham				2,796		3rd
Sarnia	Duncan Longwell				3,572		3rd
Waterloo North	Richard Gerson				6,158		3rd
Wellington—Dufferin—Peel	William Young				6,395		3rd
Wellington South	Derek Fletcher			Press operator	6,641		3rd
Windsor—Riverside	Dave Cooke	Member of Provincial Parliament for Windsor—Riverside (1977–1997)	Windsor	Social worker	17,883		1st
Windsor—Sandwich	Paul Forder				7,583		2nd
Windsor—Walkerville	Gary Parent				6,698		3rd
