= 22nd Parliament of Ontario =

The 22nd Legislative Assembly of Ontario was in session from June 4, 1945, until April 27, 1948, just prior to the 1948 general election. The majority party was the Ontario Progressive Conservative Party led by George Drew.

William James Stewart served as speaker for the assembly until March 21, 1947. James de Congalton Hepburn succeeded Stewart as speaker.

== Members of the Assembly ==
Riding	Member	Party	First elected / previously elected	No. of terms
Addington	John Abbott Pringle	Progressive Conservative	1943	2nd term
Algoma—Manitoulin	John Arthur Fullerton	Progressive Conservative	1945	1st term
Beaches	Thomas Alexander Murphy	Progressive Conservative	1926	6th term
Bellwoods	Albert Alexander MacLeod	Labour-Progressive	1943	2nd term
Bracondale	Harry Hyland Hyndman	Progressive Conservative	1945	1st term
Brant	Harry Corwin Nixon	Liberal	1919	8th term
Brantford	Stanley Dye	Progressive Conservative	1945	1st term
Bruce	John Philemon Johnstone	Progressive Conservative	1945	1st term
Carleton	Adam Holland Acres	Progressive Conservative	1923	7th term
Cochrane North	Joseph-Anaclet Habel	Liberal	1934, 1945	3rd term*
Cochrane South	Bill Grummett	Co-operative Commonwealth	1943	2nd term
Dovercourt	William Duckworth	Progressive Conservative	1934	4th term
Dufferin—Simcoe	Alfred Wallace Downer	Progressive Conservative	1937	3rd term
Durham	Reginald Percival Vivian	Progressive Conservative	1943	2nd term
Eglinton	Leslie Egerton Blackwell	Progressive Conservative	1943	2nd term
Elgin	Fletcher Stewart Thomas	Progressive Conservative	1945	1st term
Essex North	Alexander A. Parent	Liberal-Labour	1945	1st term
Essex South	William Murdoch	Progressive Conservative	1943	2nd term
Fort William	Garfield Anderson	Co-operative Commonwealth	1943	2nd term
Glengarry	Edmund MacGillivray	Liberal	1937	3rd term
Grenville—Dundas	George Holmes Challies	Progressive Conservative	1929	5th term
Grey North	Mackinnon Phillips	Progressive Conservative	1945	1st term
Grey South	Farquhar Robert Oliver	Liberal	1926 (Note: First elected as United Farmers)	6th term
Haldimand—Norfolk	Charles Hammond Martin	Progressive Conservative	1944	2nd term
Halton	Stanley Leroy Hall	Progressive Conservative	1943	2nd term
Hamilton Centre	Vernon Charles Knowles	Progressive Conservative	1945	1st term
Hamilton East	Robert Ellsworth Elliott	Progressive Conservative	1945	1st term
Hamilton—Wentworth	Russell Temple Kelley	Progressive Conservative	1945	1st term
Hastings East	Roscoe Robson	Progressive Conservative	1943	2nd term
Hastings West	James Frederick Wilson	Progressive Conservative	1945	1st term
High Park	George Alexander Drew	Progressive Conservative	1938	3rd term
Huron	Robert Hobbs Taylor	Progressive Conservative	1943	2nd term
Huron	Thomas Pryde (1948)	Progressive Conservative	1948	1st term
Huron—Bruce	John William Hanna	Progressive Conservative	1943	2nd term
Kenora	William Manson Docker	Co-operative Commonwealth	1943	2nd term
Kent East	Wesley Gardiner Thompson	Progressive Conservative	1943	2nd term
Kent West	George William Parry	Progressive Conservative	1945	1st term
Kingston	Harry Allan Stewart	Progressive Conservative	1943	2nd term
Lambton East	Charles Eusibius Janes	Progressive Conservative	1945	1st term
Lambton West	Bryan Lewis Cathcart	Progressive Conservative	1945	1st term
Lanark	George Henry Doucett	Progressive Conservative	1937	3rd term
Leeds	Walter Bain Reynolds	Progressive Conservative	1937	3rd term
Lincoln	Charles Daley	Progressive Conservative	1943	2nd term
London	William Gourlay Webster	Progressive Conservative	1943	2nd term
Middlesex North	Thomas L. Patrick	Progressive Conservative	1943	2nd term
Middlesex South	Harry Marshall Allen	Progressive Conservative	1945	1st term
Muskoka—Ontario	George Arthur Welsh	Progressive Conservative	1945	1st term
Niagara Falls	Carl David Hanniwell	Progressive Conservative	1945	1st term
Nipissing	Victor Martin	Liberal	1945	1st term
Northumberland	William Arthur Goodfellow	Progressive Conservative	1943	2nd term
Ontario	Thomas Kelso Creighton	Progressive Conservative	1945	1st term
Ottawa East	Aurele Chartrand	Liberal	1945	1st term
Ottawa South	George Harrison Dunbar	Progressive Conservative	1937	3rd term
Oxford	Thomas Roy Dent	Progressive Conservative	1943	2nd term
Parkdale	William James Stewart	Progressive Conservative	1938	3rd term
Parry Sound	Milton Taylor Armstrong	Liberal	1934, 1945	3rd term*
Peel	Thomas Laird Kennedy	Progressive Conservative	1919, 1937	7th term*
Perth	James Frederick Edwards	Progressive Conservative	1945	1st term
Peterborough	Harold Robinson Scott	Progressive Conservative	1943	2nd term
Port Arthur	Frederick Oliver Robinson	Co-operative Commonwealth	1943	2nd term
Prescott	Aurélien Bélanger	Liberal	1923, (Note: Russell) 1934	6th term*
Prince Edward—Lennox	James de Congalton Hepburn	Progressive Conservative	1937	3rd term
Rainy River	James Melvin Newman	Liberal-Labour	1945	1st term
Renfrew North	Stanley Joseph Hunt	Progressive Conservative	1943	2nd term
Renfrew South	James Shannon Dempsey	Progressive Conservative	1945	1st term
Riverdale	Gordon James Millen	Progressive Conservative	1945	1st term
Russell	Romeo Bégin	Liberal	1937	3rd term
Sault Ste. Marie	George Isaac Harvey	Co-operative Commonwealth	1943	2nd term
Simcoe Centre	George Graham Johnston	Progressive Conservative	1943	2nd term
Simcoe East	John Duncan McPhee	Progressive Conservative	1943	2nd term
St. Andrew	Joseph Baruch Salsberg	Labour-Progressive	1943	2nd term
St. David	Daniel Roland Michener	Progressive Conservative	1945	1st term
St. George	Dana Harris Porter	Progressive Conservative	1943	2nd term
St. Patrick	Archibald Kelso Roberts	Progressive Conservative	1943	2nd term
Stormont	William Alexander Murray	Liberal	1945	1st term
Sudbury	Robert Hugh Carlin	Co-operative Commonwealth	1943	2nd term
Timiskaming	Calvin Howard Taylor	Co-operative Commonwealth	1943	2nd term
Victoria	Leslie Miscampbell Frost	Progressive Conservative	1937	3rd term
Waterloo North	Joseph Ignatino Meinzinger	Liberal-Labour	1945	1st term
Waterloo South	Gordon Chaplin	Progressive Conservative	1945	1st term
Welland	Thomas Henry Lewis	Progressive Conservative	1945	1st term
Wellington North	Ross Atkinson McEwing	Liberal	1937	3rd term
Wellington South	William Ernest Hamilton	Progressive Conservative	1945	1st term
Wentworth	William Robertson	Co-operative Commonwealth	1943	2nd term
Windsor—Sandwich	William Griesinger	Progressive Conservative	1945	1st term
Windsor—Walkerville	M.C. Davies	Progressive Conservative	1945	1st term
Woodbine	Goldwin Corlett Elgie	Progressive Conservative	1934, 1945	3rd term*
York East	John A. Leslie	Progressive Conservative	1945	1st term
York North	Addison Alexander MacKenzie	Progressive Conservative	1945	1st term
York South	Howard Julian Sale	Progressive Conservative	1945	1st term
York West	John Pearman Allan	Progressive Conservative	1945	1st term

== Timeline ==
22nd Legislative Assembly of Ontario - Movement in seats held (1945–1948)
Party	1945	Gain/(loss) due to		1948
Party	1945	Death in office	Byelection hold	1948
Progressive Conservative	66	(1)	1	66
Liberal	11			11
Co-operative Commonwealth	8			8
Liberal–Labour	3			3
Labor–Progressive	2			2
Total	90	(1)	1	90

Changes in seats held (1945–1948)
Seat	Before				Change		
Seat	Date	Member	Party	Reason	Date	Member	Party
Huron	December 17, 1947	Robert Hobbs Taylor	█ PC	Died in office	February 16, 1948	Thomas Pryde	█ PC
