= Carol Mitchell =

Canadian politician

The Honourable Carol Mitchell ECO
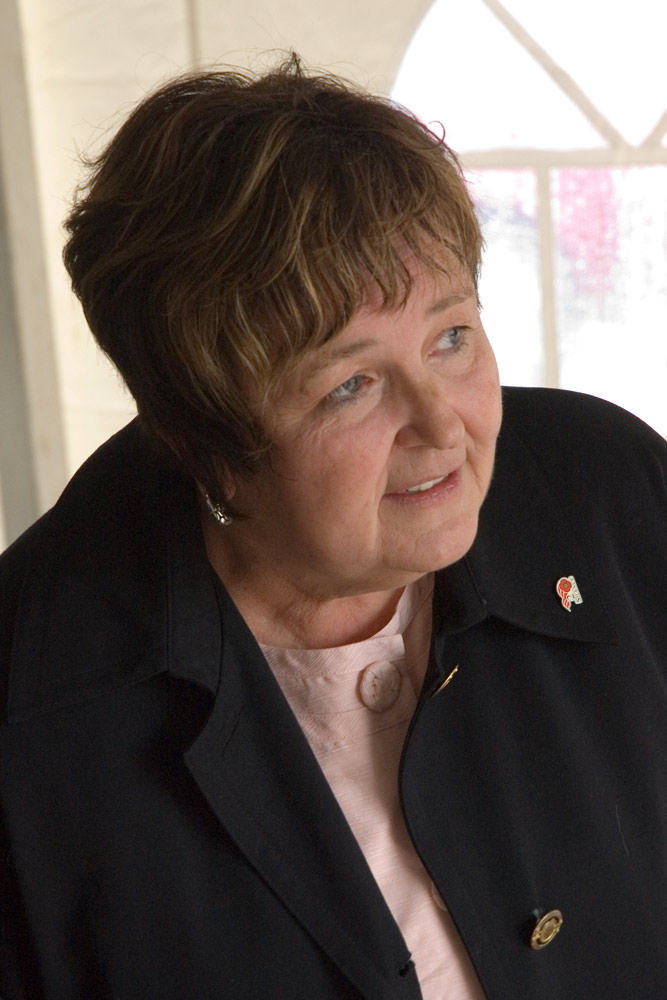

Minister of Agriculture, Food and Rural Affairs
- In office January 18, 2010 – October 6, 2011
- Premier: Dalton McGuinty
- Preceded by: Leona Dombrowsky
- Succeeded by: Ted McMeekin

Ontario MPP
- In office October 23, 2003 – October 6, 2011
- Preceded by: Helen Johns
- Succeeded by: Lisa Thompson
- Constituency: Huron—Bruce

Personal details
- Born: 1957 (age 68–69) Clinton, Ontario
- Party: Liberal
- Spouse: Larry
- Children: 2
- Occupation: Businesswomen

Carol Mitchell (born c. 1957) is a former politician in Ontario, Canada. She was a Liberal member of the Legislative Assembly of Ontario from 2003 to 2011 representing the riding of Huron—Bruce. She was a cabinet minister in the government of Dalton McGuinty.

== Background ==
Mitchell was born in Clinton, Ontario in Huron County and was educated at Fanshawe College in London, Ontario. She is a past member of Girl Guides of Canada. She worked in retailing after her graduation, and ran stores selling children's clothes in Clinton and Bayfield.

== Politics ==
She was elected to Clinton's town council in 1993, and became its reeve later in the decade. She also served on the Huron County council, and was elected as the first reeve of the amalgamated municipality of Central Huron. She was elected as warden of Huron County in 1999 and 2000.

In the 2003 provincial election she ran as the Liberal candidate in the riding of Huron—Bruce and defeated Progressive Conservative incumbent Helen Johns, a cabinet minister, by about 3,000 votes. On October 23, 2003, she was named parliamentary assistant to Steve Peters, the Ontario Minister of Agriculture and Food. In March 2006, Mitchell was named parliamentary assistant to David Caplan, the Minister of Public Infrastructure Renewal. Upon re-election in the fall of 2007, Mitchell was named Government Caucus Chair and parliamentary assistant to the Minister of Municipal Affairs and Housing, with a concentration on Municipal Affairs.

On January 18, 2010, Mitchell was named Minister of Agriculture, Food and Rural Affairs as part of a cabinet shuffle by Premier Dalton McGuinty.

She was defeated by Progressive Conservative candidate Lisa Thompson in the 2011 election.

=== Cabinet positions ===
McGuinty ministry, Province of Ontario (2003–2013)
Cabinet post (1)
Predecessor	Office	Successor
Helen Johns	Minister of Agriculture and Food; 2010–2011	Ted McMeekin

== Electoral record ==
2011 Ontario general election: Huron—Bruce
Party	Candidate	Votes	%	±%	Expenditures
Progressive Conservative	Lisa Thompson	19,138	42.76	+12.22	$ 81,890.60
Liberal	Carol Mitchell	14,659	32.75	−13.20	79,935.51
New Democratic	Grant Robertson	9,329	20.85	+7.53	32,102.53
Green	Patrick Main	772	1.72	−4.81	881.40
Family Coalition	Christine Schnurr	656	1.47	−0.85	14,592.60
Independent	Dennis Valenta	200	0.45	−0.44	0.00
Total valid votes / expense limit		44,754	100.0	+0.46	$ 90,268.64
Total rejected, unmarked and declined ballots		172	0.38	−0.09	
Turnout		44,926	59.23	−0.57	
Eligible voters		75,853		+1.35	
Progressive Conservative gain from Liberal		Swing		+12.71	
Source(s) "Official return from the records / Rapport des registres officiels - Huron—Bruce – October 6, 2011 General Election" (PDF). "2011 Candidate Campaign Returns (CR-1)". Elections Ontario.

2007 Ontario general election: Huron—Bruce
Party	Candidate	Votes	%	±%	Expenditures
Liberal	Carol Mitchell	20,469	45.95	+0.16	$ 49,205.00
Progressive Conservative	Rob Morley	13,606	30.54	−7.69	72,311.76
New Democratic	Paul Klopp	5,932	13.32	+1.86	20,183.39
Green	Victoria Serda	2,911	6.53	+4.38	7,787.36
Family Coalition	Dave Joslin	1,035	2.32	+0.24	8,064.77
Independent	Dennis Valenta	393	0.88		9,887.73
Independent	Ronald John Stephens	202	0.45		0.00
Total valid votes/expense limit		44,548	100.0	+2.62	$ 80,832.60
Total rejected ballots		209	0.47	−0.02	
Turnout		44,757	59.80	−6.66	
Eligible voters		74,845		+14.03	
Source(s) "Summary of Valid Votes Cast for Each Candidate – October 10, 2007 General Election" (PDF). "Statistical Summary – General Elections 2007" (PDF). Elections Ontario. "2007 Candidate Campaign Returns (CR-1)".

2003 Ontario general election: Huron—Bruce
Party	Candidate	Votes	%	±%	Expenditures
Liberal	Carol Mitchell	19,879	45.79	+3.96	$ 43,587.07
Progressive Conservative	Helen Johns	16,594	38.23	−7.53	68,667.03
New Democratic	Grant I. Robertson	4,973	11.46	+2.33	18,246.88
Green	Shelley Hannah	934	2.15		3,146.98
Family Coalition	Dave Joslin	902	2.08	−1.21	7,273.45
Freedom	Robert Sabharwal	127	0.29		0.00
Total valid votes/expense limit		43,409	100.0	−4.39	$ 63,013.44
Total rejected ballots		212	0.49	−0.80	
Turnout		43,621	66.46	−0.32	
Eligible voters		65,639		−4.70	
Source(s) "General Election of October 2, 2003 — Summary of Valid Ballots by Candidate". Elections Ontario. "General Election of October 2, 2003 — Statistical Summary". "2003 Election and Annual Returns - Candidate and Constituency Association Returns".
