= John Philemon Johnstone =

Canadian politician from Ontario (1873–1960)

Member of the Ontario Provincial Parliament for Bruce
- In office November 22, 1951 – May 2, 1955
- Preceded by: T. Kenzie Foster
- Succeeded by: Ross Whicher
- In office June 4, 1945 – April 27, 1948
- Preceded by: Thomas Neil Duff
- Succeeded by: T. Kenzie Foster

Personal details
- Born: September 15, 1873 Walkerton, Ontario, Canada
- Died: November 21, 1960 (aged 87) Sundridge, Ontario, Canada
- Party: Progressive Conservative
- Occupation: Politician

John Philemon Galt Johnstone (September 15, 1873 – November 21, 1960) was a politician in Ontario, Canada. He was a Progressive Conservative member of the Legislative Assembly of Ontario from 1945 to 1948, and again from 1951 to 1955.

== See also ==
- 22nd Parliament of Ontario
- 24th Parliament of Ontario
