= William Torrance =

William Torrance may refer to:

- William Torrance Allen, Canadian politician from Ontario
- William Torrance Hays, Canadian politician from Ontario

== See also ==
- William Dorrance Beach
