= William Henry Fraser =

Canadian politician from Ontario

Member of the Ontario Provincial Parliament for Huron North
- In office December 2, 1918 – September 23, 1919
- Preceded by: Armstrong Musgrove
- Succeeded by: John Joynt

Personal details
- Party: Liberal

William Henry Fraser was a Canadian politician from Ontario. He represented Huron North in the Legislative Assembly of Ontario from a 1918 by-election until 1919.

== See also ==
- 14th Parliament of Ontario
