= Lisa Thompson (politician) =

Canadian politician

The Honourable Lisa Thompson ECO MPP
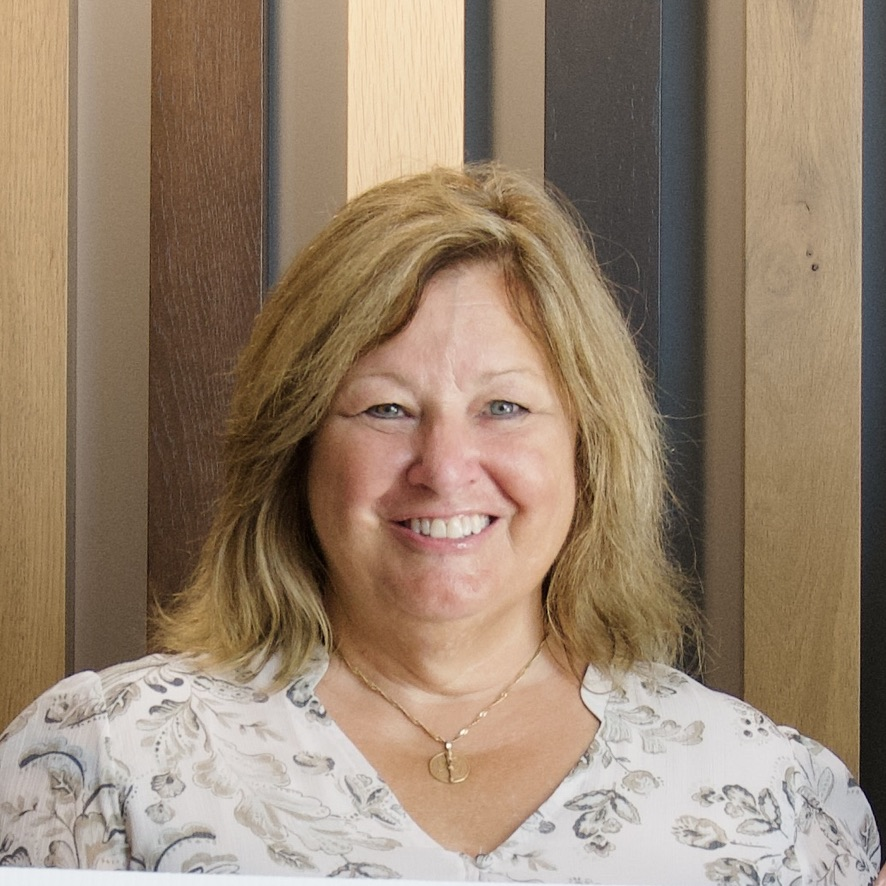
- Thompson in 2025

Minister of Rural Affairs
- Incumbent
- Assumed office June 6, 2024
- Premier: Doug Ford
- Preceded by: Ernie Hardeman

Minister of Government and Consumer Services
- In office June 20, 2019 – June 18, 2021
- Premier: Doug Ford
- Preceded by: Bill Walker
- Succeeded by: Ross Romano

Minister of Education
- In office June 29, 2018 – June 20, 2019
- Premier: Doug Ford
- Preceded by: Indira Naidoo-Harris
- Succeeded by: Stephen Lecce

Member of the Ontario Provincial Parliament for Huron—Bruce
- Incumbent
- Assumed office October 6, 2011
- Preceded by: Carol Mitchell

Personal details
- Born: 1965 (age 60–61) Wingham, Ontario, Canada
- Party: Progressive Conservative
- Spouse: Dennis Schiestel
- Occupation: Cooperative general manager

Lisa M. Thompson ECO MPP (born c. 1965) is a Canadian politician who serves as Ontario's Minister of Rural Affairs. She has represented the riding of Huron—Bruce in the Legislative Assembly of Ontario as a member of the Progressive Conservative Party since 2011.

She previously served as Ontario Minister of Education from 2018 to 2019, as Minister of Government and Consumer Services from 2019 to 2021, and as Minister of Agriculture, Food and Rural Affairs from 2021 to 2024.

== Background ==
Thompson was born in Wingham, Ontario. She is a graduate of the University of Guelph. Prior to her election as an MPP, she worked as the general manager of The Ontario Dairy Goat Cooperative, and as a Rural Community Advisor for OMAFRA. She lives near Teeswater, Ontario with her husband Dennis.

== Politics ==
Thompson ran in the 2011 provincial election as the Progressive Conservative candidate in the riding of Huron—Bruce. She defeated Liberal incumbent Carol Mitchell by 4,479 votes. She was re-elected in the 2014 provincial election, defeating Liberal candidate Colleen Schenk by 3,865 votes, and in the 2018 provincial election, defeating Jan Johnstone of the NDP by 12,320 votes.

She served as the party's critic for Environment and Climate Change, critic for Energy (Green Energy Act) and critic for Small Business and Red Tape. In February 2017, she was appointed as the PC party's Critic for Indigenous Relations and Reconciliation and Critic for International Trade.

In January 2018, after party leader Patrick Brown stepped down and was replaced by Vic Fedeli, Thompson was chosen as the party's new caucus chair.

Following the 2018 provincial election, Lisa Thompson was named Minister of Education in Premier Doug Ford's cabinet. On June 20, 2019, she was reassigned as Minister of Government and Consumer Services. In June 2021, Thompson became Minister of Agriculture, Food and Rural Affairs. In June 2024, she became Minister of Rural Affairs after the June 6 Cabinet Shuffle split her ministry into two. Rob Flack took over as Minister of Farming, Agriculture and Agribusiness.

== Electoral record ==
2025 Ontario general election: Huron—Bruce
Party	Candidate	Votes	%	±%
Progressive Conservative	Lisa Thompson	24,461	50.02	–1.95
Liberal	Ian Burbidge	13,703	28.02	+9.31
New Democratic	Nick McGregor	5,739	11.74	–4.64
Green	Matthew Van Ankum	2,727	5.58	+1.48
New Blue	Zack Weiler	2,065	4.22	–2.99
Ontario Alliance	Bruce Eisen	206	0.42	+0.26
Total valid votes		48,901	99.25	
Total rejected, unmarked and declined ballots		368	0.75	+0.16
Turnout		49,269	54.86	+0.70
Eligible voters		89,807		
Progressive Conservative hold		Swing		–5.63
Source: Elections Ontario

2022 Ontario general election: Huron—Bruce
Party	Candidate	Votes	%	±%	Expenditures
Progressive Conservative	Lisa Thompson	24,369	51.97	–0.39	$68,075
Liberal	Shelley Blackmore	8,775	18.71	+4.78	$32,861
New Democratic	Laurie Hazzard	7,679	16.38	–12.65	$42,759
New Blue	Matt Kennedy	3,384	7.22	–	$19,069
Green	Matthew Van Ankum	1,922	4.10	+0.68	$3,276
Ontario Party	Gerrie Huenemoerder	474	1.01	+0.50	$680
Independent	Ronald Stephens	212	0.45	–0.30	$0
Ontario Alliance	Bruce Eisen	77	0.16	–0.35	$0
Total valid votes/expense limit		46,892	99.41	–	$121,926
Total rejected, unmarked and declined ballots		277	0.59	–0.62	
Turnout		47,169	54.16	–9.35	
Eligible voters		87,090			
Progressive Conservative hold		Swing		–2.59	
Source: Elections Ontario

2018 Ontario general election: Huron—Bruce
Party	Candidate	Votes	%	±%
Progressive Conservative	Lisa Thompson	27,646	52.36	+13.35
New Democratic	Jan Johnstone	15,326	29.03	+6.18
Liberal	Don Matheson	7,356	13.93	–16.93
Green	Nicholas Wendler	1,804	3.42	–0.06
Libertarian	Ron Stephens	399	0.76	+0.08
Alliance	Gerrie Huenemoerder	271	0.51	–
Total valid votes		52,802	98.79	
Total rejected, unmarked and declined ballots		646	1.21	–0.38
Turnout		53,448	63.51	+3.55
Eligible voters		84,157		
Progressive Conservative hold		Swing		+3.59
Source: Elections Ontario

2014 Ontario general election: Huron—Bruce
Party	Candidate	Votes	%	±%
Progressive Conservative	Lisa Thompson	18,512	39.01	–3.75
Liberal	Colleen Schenk	14,647	30.86	–1.89
New Democratic	Jan Johnstone	10,843	22.85	+2.00
Green	Adam Werstine	1,651	3.48	+1.75
Family Coalition	Andrew Zettel	1,353	2.85	+1.39
Libertarian	Max Maister	323	0.68	–
Equal Parenting	Dennis Valenta	128	0.27	–0.18
Total valid votes		47,457	98.41	
Total rejected, unmarked and declined ballots		765	1.59	+1.20
Turnout		48,222	59.96	+0.73
Eligible voters		80,428		
Progressive Conservative hold		Swing		–0.93
Source: Elections Ontario

2011 Ontario general election: Huron—Bruce
Party	Candidate	Votes	%	±%	Expenditures
Progressive Conservative	Lisa Thompson	19,138	42.76	+12.22	$81,890.60
Liberal	Carol Mitchell	14,659	32.75	–13.19	$79,935.51
New Democratic	Grant Robertson	9,329	20.85	+7.53	$32,102.53
Green	Patrick Main	772	1.72	–4.81	$881.40
Family Coalition	Christine Schnurr	656	1.47	–0.86	$14,592.60
Independent	Dennis Valenta	200	0.45	–0.44	$0
Total valid votes/expense limit		44,754	99.62	–	$90,268.64
Total rejected, unmarked and declined ballots		172	0.38	–0.08	
Turnout		44,926	59.23	–0.57	
Eligible voters		75,853			
Progressive Conservative gain from Liberal		Swing		+12.71	
Source: Elections Ontario

== Cabinet positions ==
Ford ministry, Province of Ontario (2018–present)
Cabinet posts (3)
Predecessor	Office	Successor
Ernie Hardeman	Minister of Agriculture, Food and Rural Affairs; June 18, 2021 - present	Incumbent
Bill Walker	Minister of Government and Consumer Services; June 20, 2019 - June 18, 2021	Ross Romano
Indira Naidoo-Harris	Minister of Education; June 29, 2018 - June 20, 2019	Stephen Lecce
