= Huron East (provincial electoral district) =

Former provincial electoral district in Ontario, Canada

Ontario electoral district

Defunct provincial electoral district
- Legislature: Legislative Assembly of Ontario
- District created: 1875
- District abolished: 1908
- First contested: 1875
- Last contested: 1905

Huron East was a provincial electoral district in Ontario, Canada. It existed from 1875 to 1908 and consisted of the eastern areas of Huron County.

It was consistently represented by Liberals.

== Members of Provincial Parliament ==
Huron East
Assembly	Years	Member	Party
Riding created from Huron North
3rd	1875–1879	Thomas Gibson	Liberal
4th	1879–1883	Thomas Gibson	Liberal
5th	1883–1886	Thomas Gibson	Liberal
6th	1886–1890	Thomas Gibson	Liberal
7th	1890–1894	Thomas Gibson	Liberal
8th	1894–1898	Thomas Gibson	Liberal
9th	1898–1902	Archibald Hislop	Liberal
10th	1902–1905	Archibald Hislop	Liberal
11th	1905–1908	Archibald Hislop	Liberal
Riding dissolved into Huron North and Huron Centre

== Election results ==
1905 Ontario general election
Party	Candidate	Votes	%	±%
Liberal	Archibald Hislop	2,212	51.66	–3.97
Conservative	James Bowman	2,070	48.34	+3.97
Total valid votes		4,282	99.93	
Total rejected ballots		3	0.07	–0.56
Turnout		4,285	86.22	+8.04
Eligible voters		4,970		
Liberal hold		Swing		–3.97
Source: Elections Ontario

1902 Ontario general election
Party	Candidate	Votes	%	±%
Liberal	Archibald Hislop	2,299	55.63	–0.12
Conservative	A. Spotton	1,834	44.37	+0.12
Total valid votes		4,133	99.37	
Total rejected ballots		26	0.63	+0.44
Turnout		4,159	78.18	+3.49
Eligible voters		5,320		
Liberal hold		Swing		–0.12
Source: Elections Ontario

1898 Ontario general election
Party	Candidate	Votes	%	±%
Liberal	Archibald Hislop	2,417	55.74	–0.21
Conservative	H. Mooney	1,919	44.26	–
Total valid votes		4,336	99.82	
Total rejected ballots		8	0.18	–0.18
Turnout		4,344	74.69	+0.25
Eligible voters		5,816		
Liberal hold		Swing		–0.11
Source: Elections Ontario

1894 Ontario general election
Party	Candidate	Votes	%	±%
Liberal	Thomas Gibson	2,129	55.95	–0.32
Liberal-Patrons of Industry	W. Milne	1,676	44.05	–
Total valid votes		3,805	99.63	
Total rejected ballots		14	0.37	–0.47
Turnout		3,819	74.44	+0.57
Eligible voters		5,130		
Liberal hold		Swing		–0.16
Source: Elections Ontario

1890 Ontario general election
Party	Candidate	Votes	%	±%
Liberal	Thomas Gibson	2,256	56.27	+0.96
Conservative	A. H. Musgrave	1,753	43.73	–0.96
Total valid votes		4,009	99.16	
Total rejected ballots		34	0.84	+0.48
Turnout		4,043	73.87	+0.55
Eligible voters		5,473		
Liberal hold		Swing		+0.96
Source: Elections Ontario

1886 Ontario general election
Party	Candidate	Votes	%	±%
Liberal	Thomas Gibson	2,306	55.31	+4.79
Conservative	T.E. Hays	1,863	44.69	–4.79
Total valid votes		4,169	99.64	
Total rejected ballots		15	0.36	–0.25
Turnout		4,184	73.33	–2.25
Eligible voters		5,706		
Liberal hold		Swing		+4.79
Source: Elections Ontario

1883 Ontario general election
Party	Candidate	Votes	%	±%
Liberal	Thomas Gibson	1,994	50.52	–0.22
Conservative	T. E. Hays	1,953	49.48	+0.22
Total valid votes		3,947	99.40	
Total rejected ballots		24	0.60	+0.60
Turnout		3,971	75.58	+6.82
Eligible voters		5,254		
Liberal hold		Swing		–0.22
Source: Elections Ontario

1879 Ontario general election
Party	Candidate	Votes	%	±%
Liberal	Thomas Gibson	1,924	50.74	−2.18
Conservative	Mr. Holmes	1,868	49.26	+2.18
Total valid votes		3,792	68.76	−2.13
Eligible voters		5,515		
Liberal hold		Swing		−2.18
Source: Elections Ontario

1875 Ontario general election
Party	Candidate	Votes	%
Liberal	Thomas Gibson	1,530	52.92
Conservative	F. Vannorman	1,361	47.08
Turnout		2,891	70.89
Eligible voters		4,078	
Liberal pickup new district.			
Source: Elections Ontario

== See also ==
- List of Ontario provincial electoral districts
- Canadian provincial electoral districts
