= Murray Gaunt =

Canadian politician

MPP for Huron-Bruce
- In office October 4, 1962 – March 18, 1981
- Preceded by: John William Hanna
- Succeeded by: Murray Elston

Personal details
- Born: Murray Andrew Gaunt; June 4, 1935 West Wawanosh Township, Huron County, Ontario, Canada
- Died: March 31, 2009 (aged 73) London, Ontario, Canada
- Party: Ontario Liberal Party
- Occupation: Farmer, Broadcaster, politician

Murray Andrew Gaunt (June 4, 1935 – March 31, 2009) was a Canadian politician. He served in the Legislative Assembly of Ontario as a Liberal Party Member of Provincial Parliament (MPP) from 1962 to 1981, representing the riding of Huron-Bruce, and served as an Opposition member facing successful Progressive Conservative governments. First elected in a by-election in 1962, he went on to win general elections in 1963, 1967, 1971, 1975 and 1977 and he served in the 26th, 27th, 28th, 29th, 30th and the 31st Legislative Assemblies of Ontario.

Gaunt was born in West Wawanosh Township to a farming family. He won the 1955 Queen Guineas beef award at the Royal Agricultural Winter Fair in Toronto. A year later, he graduated from the Ontario Agricultural College in Guelph and began poultry farming.

In 1962, the death of John William Hanna, the member for Huron-Bruce, led to a by-election in which Gaunt ran and won. He subsequently won four more elections, remaining in office for a total of 19 years.

Gaunt was elected to the Agriculture Hall of Fame in 2005. He died in London, Ontario, on March 31, 2009, at the age of 73. Gaunt is buried in the Wingham Cemetery, Wingham, Ontario.
