= Helen Johns =

Canadian politician

The Honourable Helen Johns ECO

Ontario MPP
- In office 1995–2003
- Preceded by: Paul Klopp
- Succeeded by: Carol Mitchell
- Constituency: Huron (1995–99) & Huron—Bruce (1999–2003)

Personal details
- Born: April 24, 1953 (age 73) Toronto, Ontario
- Party: Progressive Conservative
- Education: York University; University of Windsor; Simon Fraser University

Helen Johns (born April 24, 1953) is a former politician in Ontario, Canada. She was a Progressive Conservative member of the Legislative Assembly of Ontario from 1995 to 2003 and served as a cabinet minister in the governments of Mike Harris and Ernie Eves.

== Background ==
Johns was born in Toronto, Ontario. She attended York University, the University of Windsor and Simon Fraser University where she majored in business and commerce. She worked as a controller of small and medium-sized businesses for fifteen years before entering public life, and was also the Director and Treasurer of the Huron United Way.

== Politics ==
Johns was elected to the Ontario legislature in the provincial election of 1995, defeating Liberal John Jewitt and incumbent New Democrat Paul Klopp in the riding of Huron. For the next four years, she served as a backbench government member.

Prior to the 1999 election, the number of seats was reduced from 130 to 103. Johns and fellow MPP Barb Fisher (riding of Bruce) competed for the Tory nomination in the redistributed riding of Huron—Bruce. Johns won the nomination battle. In the ensuing election campaign, she narrowly defeated Liberal candidate Ross Lamont. On June 17, 1999, she was named Citizenship, Culture and Recreation. Following a cabinet shuffle on February 8, 2001, she was named Associate Minister of Health and Long-Term Care, under Tony Clement.

When Ernie Eves replaced Harris as Premier on April 15, 2002, he named Johns as his Minister of Agriculture and Food. and also served as interim Minister of Municipal Affairs and Housing in early 2003.

In the 2003 provincial election she was defeated by Liberal Carol Mitchell by about 3,000 votes.

=== Cabinet positions ===
Eves ministry, Province of Ontario (2002–2003)
Cabinet posts (2)
Predecessor	Office	Successor
Chris Hodgson	Ministry of Municipal Affairs and Housing; 2003 (January–February); Appointed as interim minister	David Young
Brian Coburn	Minister of Agriculture and Food; 2002–2003	Steve Peters
Harris ministry, Province of Ontario (1995–2002)
Cabinet posts (2)
Predecessor	Office	Successor
New position	Associate Minister of Health and Long-Term Care; 2001–2002	Dan Newman
Isabel Bassett	Minister of Citizenship, Culture and Recreation; 1999–2001	Cam Jackson

== Electoral record ==
2003 Ontario general election: Huron—Bruce
Party	Candidate	Votes	%	±%	Expenditures
Liberal	Carol Mitchell	19,879	45.79	+3.96	$43,587.07
Progressive Conservative	Helen Johns	16,594	38.23	–7.53	$68,667.03
New Democratic	Grant I. Robertson	4,973	11.46	+2.33	$18,246.88
Green	Shelley Hannah	934	2.15	–	$3,146.98
Family Coalition	Dave Joslin	902	2.08	–1.21	$7,273.45
Freedom	Robert Sabharwal	127	0.29	–	$0
Total valid votes/expense limit		43,409	99.51	–	$63,013.44
Total rejected, unmarked and declined ballots		212	0.49	–0.80	
Turnout		43,621	66.46	–0.32	
Eligible voters		65,639			
Liberal gain from Progressive Conservative		Swing		+5.74	
Source: Elections Ontario

1999 Ontario general election: Huron—Bruce
Party	Candidate	Votes	%	Expenditures
Progressive Conservative	Helen Johns	20,772	45.75	$60,434.00
Liberal	Ross Lamont	18,993	41.83	$36,010.47
New Democratic	Tony McQuail	4,142	9.12	$19,753.75
Family Coalition	Linda Freiburger	1,494	3.29	$6,769.68
Total valid votes/expense limit		45,401	98.72	$66,118.08
Total rejected, unmarked and declined ballots		591	1.29	
Turnout		45,992	66.78	
Eligible voters		68,873		
Liberal pickup new district.				
Source: Elections Ontario
