= Ministry of Rural Affairs (Ontario) =

Canadian provincial ministry in Ontario

- French: Ministère des Affaires rurales
- Government of Ontario wordmark

Agency overview
- Formed: June 6, 2024
- Preceding agency: Ministry of Agriculture, Food and Rural Affairs
- Type: Government ministry
- Jurisdiction: Government of Ontario
- Headquarters: 777 Bay Street Toronto, Ontario M5G 2C8
- Minister responsible: Lisa Thompson, Minister of Rural Affairs
- Key document: Ministry of Agriculture, Food and Rural Affairs Act
- Website: ontario.ca/page/ministry-rural-affairs

The Ministry of Rural Affairs is a ministry of the Government of Ontario responsible for rural communities of the Canadian province of Ontario. The Minister responsible is Lisa Thompson. The ministry was a part of the Ministry of Agriculture, Food, and Rural Affairs and its preceding ministries until 2024.

== Mandate ==
The mandate of the ministry is stated to be:

"The Ministry of Rural Affairs (MRA) serves the needs of rural Ontario by supporting and helping build rural communities that are sustainable, resilient, trusted, innovative and thriving. Ministry programs and activities strengthen Ontario, its places and its people in rural communities, support and create good jobs, attract investment, and contribute to Ontario's overall well-being and economic growth."

== Ministry agencies ==
The Rural Economic Development Advisory Panel is an independent agency affiliated with the Ministry of Rural Affairs that provides recommendations on funding applications to the Rural Ontario Development (ROD) program, formerly called the Rural Economic Development program.
