= Archibald Hislop =

Canadian politician (1861–1937)

Archibald Hislop (December 25, 1861 – February 15, 1937) was a farmer and politician in Ontario, Canada. He represented Huron East in the Legislative Assembly of Ontario from 1898 to 1908 as a Liberal.

The son of John and Catherine Hislop (née Sellers), natives of Scotland, he was born in Grey township and was educated in Goderich. Hislop served on the township council, also serving as deputy reeve. He was secretary-treasurer of the East Huron Farmers Institute. Hislop ran unsuccessfully for the Huron East seat in the House of Commons of Canada in 1908 and again in 1911; he was an unsuccessful candidate for the Huron North seat in 1917. He also ran again in a 1927 Huron North by-election when the office holder died.
