= John William Sinclair =

Canadian politician

John William Sinclair (September 3, 1879 – March 26, 1958) was a farmer and politician in Ontario, Canada. He represented Bruce in the Legislative Assembly of Ontario from 1934 to 1943 as a Liberal.

The son of Duncan Sinclair and Sarah Ann Linn, he was born in Sullivan township, Grey County. In 1905, he married the daughter of Robert Neil. Sinclair served as reeve or Arran township and was warden for Bruce County in 1924.
