= Thomas Gibson (Canadian politician) =

Canadian politician

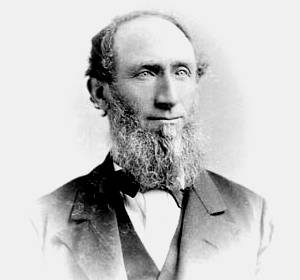
Thomas Gibson Source: Library and Archives Canada

Thomas Gibson (8 January 1825 – 1901) was an Ontario political figure. He represented Huron North in the Legislative Assembly of Ontario from 1871 to 1874 and Huron East from 1875 to 1898. He was a Liberal.

== Life ==
He was born in Greenlaw, Berwickshire, Scotland in Jan 1825, the son of Thomas Gibson (1751–1820) and his wife Helen Lunham. He was educated at the free church school in Greenlaw. He came to Canada West in 1854. He served as reeve for Howick Township for 7 years. He ran unsuccessfully in Huron North in 1867.

The township of Gibson, now part of the Township of Georgian Bay in the Muskoka District, was named after him.

He died in January 1901 and is buried in Wroxeter, Ontario with his wife Elizabeth (1830–1878).

His nephew was the noted mathematician Prof George Alexander Gibson FRSE (1858–1930).

== Electoral history ==
1871 Ontario general election: Huron North
Party	Candidate	Votes	%	±%
Liberal	Thomas Gibson	2,259	55.86	+6.66
Conservative	William Torrance Hays	1,785	44.14	−6.66
Turnout		4,044	68.67	−3.81
Eligible voters		5,889		
Liberal gain from Conservative		Swing		+6.66
Source: Elections Ontario

1875 Ontario general election: Huron East
Party	Candidate	Votes	%
Liberal	Thomas Gibson	1,530	52.92
Conservative	F. Vannorman	1,361	47.08
Turnout		2,891	70.89
Eligible voters		4,078	
Liberal pickup new district.			
Source: Elections Ontario

1879 Ontario general election: Huron East
Party	Candidate	Votes	%	±%
Liberal	Thomas Gibson	1,924	50.74	−2.18
Conservative	Mr. Holmes	1,868	49.26	+2.18
Total valid votes		3,792	68.76	−2.13
Eligible voters		5,515		
Liberal hold		Swing		−2.18
Source: Elections Ontario
