= James Simpson Ballantyne =

Canadian politician from Ontario

Member of the Ontario Provincial Parliament for Huron
- In office June 19, 1934 – June 30, 1943
- Preceded by: constituency established
- Succeeded by: Robert Hobbs Taylor

Personal details
- Party: Liberal

James Simpson Ballantyne was a Canadian politician who was Liberal MPP for Huron from 1934 to 1943.

== See also ==
- 19th Parliament of Ontario
- 20th Parliament of Ontario
