= Charles Alexander Robertson =

Canadian politician from Ontario

Member of the Ontario Provincial Parliament for Huron—Bruce Huron North (1926—1934)
- In office December 1, 1926 – March 22, 1940
- Preceded by: John Joynt
- Succeeded by: John William Hanna

Personal details
- Died: March 22, 1940
- Party: Liberal

Charles Alexander Robertson (died March 22, 1940) was a Canadian politician who was Liberal MPP for Huron—Bruce in the early 20th-century.

== See also ==
- 17th Parliament of Ontario
- 18th Parliament of Ontario
- 19th Parliament of Ontario
- 20th Parliament of Ontario
