= Armstrong Musgrove =

Armstrong H. Musgrove

MPP for Huron North
- In office June 08, 1908 – February 06, 1918
- Preceded by: first member
- Succeeded by: William Henry Fraser

Personal details
- Born: March 26, 1854 Pickering Township, Canada West
- Died: March 28, 1940 (aged 86) Wingham, Ontario
- Party: Conservative

Armstrong H. Musgrove (March 26, 1854 – March 28, 1940) was an educator and political figure in Ontario. He represented Huron North in the Legislative Assembly of Ontario from 1908 to 1918 as a Conservative member.

He was born in Pickering township, the son of John Musgrove and Mary A. Armstrong, both natives of Ireland. In 1881, Musgrove married Margaret Simpson. He was a school teacher and principal. Musgrove was defeated when he ran for the Huron East seat in the Ontario assembly in 1890.

His brother George also served in the assembly. He died at Wingham, Ontario, in March 1940 and was buried at Wingham Cemetery.
