= 2010 Huron County municipal elections =

Local election in Ontario, Canada

Elections took place in Huron County, Ontario, on October 25, 2010, in conjunction with municipal elections across the province.

== Huron County Council ==
Position	Elected
Ashfield-Colborne-Wawanosh reeve	Bill Van Diepenbeek
Ashfield-Colborne-Wawanosh deputy reeve	(selected from council)
Bluewater mayor	Bill Dowson
Bluewater deputy mayor	Paul Klopp
Bluewater councillor	Tyler Hessel
Central Huron reeve	Jim Ginn
Central Huron deputy reeve	David Jewitt
Goderich mayor	Deb Shewfelt
Goderich deputy mayor	John Grace
Howick reeve	Art Versteeg
Huron East mayor	Bernie MacLellan
Huron East deputy mayor	Joe Steffler
Morris-Turnberry mayor	Paul Gowing
North Huron reeve	Neil Vincent
South Huron mayor	George Robertson
South Huron deputy mayor	Jim Dietrich

== Ashfield-Colborne-Wawanosh ==
Reeve candidate	Vote	%
Ben Van Diepenbeek (X)	Acclaimed	

== Bluewater ==
Mayoral candidate	Vote	%
Bill Dowson (X)	2,588	
Jim Ferguson	2,242	

== Central Huron ==
Reeve candidate	Vote	%
Jim Ginn	1,591	
Bert Dykstra (X)	1,044	

== Goderich ==
Mayoral candidate	Vote	%
Deb Shewfelt (X)	Acclaimed	

== Howick ==
Reeve candidate	Vote	%
Art Versteeg	397	
Andrea Youngblut	368	
Max Demaray (X)	272	
Rosemary Rognvaldson	184	

== Huron East ==
Mayoral candidate	Vote	%
Bernie MacLellan	1,575	
Paul Vander Molen	1,014	

== Morris-Turnberry ==
Mayoral candidate	Vote	%
Paul Gowing	983	
Dorothy Kelly (X)	566	

== North Huron ==
Reeve candidate	Vote	%
Neil Vincent (X)	Acclaimed	

== South Huron ==
Mayoral candidate	Vote	%
George Robertson	2,473	59.29
Ken Oke	1,698	40.71
