= T. Kenzie Foster =

Canadian politician from Ontario

Member of the Ontario Provincial Parliament for Bruce
- In office June 7, 1948 – October 6, 1951
- Preceded by: John Philemon Johnstone
- Succeeded by: John Philemon Johnstone

Personal details
- Party: Liberal

T. Kenzie Foster was a Canadian politician who was Liberal MPP for Bruce from 1948 to 1951.

== See also ==
- 23rd Parliament of Ontario
