= Thomas Neil Duff =

Canadian politician

Thomas Neil Duff (February 13, 1896 – 1978) was a farmer and politician in Ontario, Canada. He represented Bruce in the Legislative Assembly of Ontario from 1943 to 1945 as a Liberal.

The son of James and Margaret Duff, he was born near Desboro and was educated there.
