= Charles MacNaughton =

Canadian politician

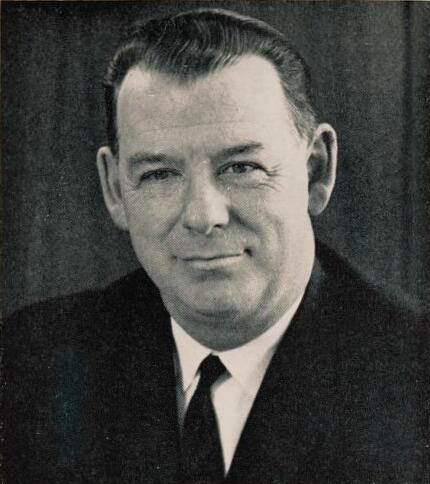
- McNaughton, c. 1966

Ontario MPP
- In office 1958–1973
- Preceded by: Thomas Pryde
- Succeeded by: Jack Riddell
- Constituency: Huron

Personal details
- Born: May 15, 1911 Strasbourg, Saskatchewan
- Died: November 17, 1987 (aged 76) Exeter, Ontario
- Party: Progressive Conservative
- Occupation: Seed distributor

Charles Steel MacNaughton (May 15, 1911 – November 20, 1987) was a politician in Ontario, Canada. He was a Progressive Conservative member of the Legislative Assembly of Ontario from 1958 to 1973 who represented the central Ontario riding of Huron. He served as a cabinet minister in the governments of John Robarts and Bill Davis.

== Background ==
MacNaughton was born in Strasbourg, Saskatchewan in 1911 and grew up and lived in Brandon, Manitoba, where he worked in the seed industry, before moving to Exeter, Ontario in 1944 as a seed distributor. He was a founding member of the South Huron Hospital in Exeter and served as a member of the South Huron District High School Board for nine years, including two as chairman.

MacNaughton died in Exeter on November 17, 1987. He was married to Adeline M. W. Fulcher (1913–1997) and was survived by son, John MacNaughton (d. 2013), a Toronto investment banker and Heather MacNaughton. MacNaughton is buried in the Exeter Cemetery, Huron County, Ontario. MacNaughton Park and MacNaughton-Morrison section of South Huron Trail are named for the former MPP.

== Politics ==
MacNaughton ran as the PC candidate in a by-election held on May 12, 1958. He defeated his Liberal opponent J.A. Addison by 1,197 votes. He was re-elected four times before retiring in 1973.

On October 25, 1962 he was appointed as Minister of Highways. In this position he oversaw the completion of Highway 401 and its expansion of six lanes and more in some places. On November 25, 1966 he was appointed as Treasurer of Ontario.

When Bill Davis became Premier in 1971 he returned MacNaughton to the Transportation portfolio.

MacNaughton retired from politics in January, 1973 and Davis appointed him as chairman of the Ontario Racing Commission.

=== Cabinet posts ===
Davis ministry, Province of Ontario (1971–1985)
Cabinet posts (3)
Predecessor	Office	Successor
Darcy McKeough	Treasurer of Ontario; 1972-1973	John White
Darcy McKeough	Minister of Intergovernmental Affairs; 1972-1973	John White
George Gomme	Minister of Transportation and Communications; 1971-1972	Gordon Carton
Robarts ministry, Province of Ontario (1961–1971)
Cabinet posts (3)
Predecessor	Office	Successor
New position	Minister of Revenue; 1968 (July–October)	John White
James Allan	Treasurer of Ontario; 1966-1971; Also Treasury Board chair	John White
Bill Goodfellow	Minister of Highways; 1962-1966	George Gomme
