= Huron North (provincial electoral district) =

Former provincial electoral district in Ontario, Canada

Ontario electoral district

Defunct provincial electoral district
- Legislature: Legislative Assembly of Ontario
- District created: 1867
- District abolished: 1929
- First contested: 1867
- Last contested: 1929

Huron North was a provincial electoral district in Ontario, Canada. It existed from 1867 to 1874, and again from 1908 to 1934, when it was abolished into Huron—Bruce. It consisted of the northern areas of Huron County.

== Members of Provincial Parliament ==
Huron North
Assembly	Years	Member	Party
Riding created
1st	1867–1871	William Torrance Hays	Conservative
2nd	1871–1874	Thomas Gibson	Liberal
Riding dissolved into Huron East, Huron South and Huron West
Riding created from Huron East and Huron West
12th	1908–1911	Armstrong Musgrove	Conservative
13th	1911–1914	Armstrong Musgrove	Conservative
14th	1914–1918	Armstrong Musgrove	Conservative
14th	1918–1919	William Henry Fraser	Liberal
15th	1919–1923	John Joynt	Conservative
16th	1923–1926	John Joynt	Conservative
17th	1926–1929	Charles Alexander Robertson	Liberal
18th	1929–1934	Charles Alexander Robertson	Liberal
Riding dissolved into Huron—Bruce and Huron

== Election results ==
=== 1908–1934 ===
1929 Ontario general election
Party	Candidate	Votes	%	±%
Liberal	Charles Alexander Robertson	5,795	57.18	–1.79
Conservative	James Benson Whitely	4,340	42.82	+1.79
Total valid votes		10,135	99.47	
Total rejected ballots		54	0.53	+0.20
Turnout		10,189	69.69	–3.88
Eligible voters		14,621		
Liberal hold		Swing		–1.79
Source: Elections Ontario

1926 Ontario general election
Party	Candidate	Votes	%	±%
Liberal	Charles Alexander Robertson	6,386	58.97	+41.75
Conservative	John Joynt	4,444	41.03	–3.41
Total valid votes		10,830	99.67	
Total rejected ballots		36	0.33	+0.06
Turnout		10,866	73.57	+5.46
Eligible voters		14,770		
Liberal gain from Conservative		Swing		–
Source: Elections Ontario

1923 Ontario general election
Party	Candidate	Votes	%	±%
Conservative	John Joynt	2,896	44.44	+6.83
United Farmers	Sheldon Bricker	2,498	38.34	+9.14
Liberal	Abner Cosens	1,122	17.22	–15.97
Total valid votes		6,516	99.72	
Total rejected ballots		18	0.28	–1.86
Turnout		6,534	68.11	–13.55
Eligible voters		9,594		
Conservative hold		Swing		–1.15
Source: Elections Ontario

1919 Ontario general election
Party	Candidate	Votes	%	±%
Conservative	John Joynt	2,897	37.61	–
Liberal	William Henry Fraser	2,556	33.19	–16.04
United Farmers	Richard C. Proctor	2,249	29.20	–
Total valid votes		7,702	97.87	
Total rejected ballots		168	2.13	+2.13
Turnout		7,870	81.66	–
Eligible voters		9,638		
Conservative gain from Independent		Swing		+8.02
Source: Elections Ontario

Ontario provincial by-election, December 2, 1918 Resignation of Armstrong Musgrove upon appointment as Postmaster of Wingham
Party	Candidate	Votes	%	±%
Independent	William Henry Fraser	3,146	49.23	–
Unknown	Thomas Case	1,889	29.56	–
Unknown	George Spotton	1,356	21.22	–
Total valid votes		6,391	100.00	
Total rejected ballots		–		
Turnout		6,391	–	–
Eligible voters				
Independent gain from Conservative		Swing		+0.00
Source: Elections Ontario

1914 Ontario general election
Party	Candidate	Votes	%	±%
Conservative	Armstrong Musgrove	2,103	51.59	–1.62
Liberal	John George Anderson	1,973	48.41	+1.62
Total valid votes		4,076	99.41	
Total rejected ballots		24	0.59	+0.35
Turnout		4,100	96.61	+15.66
Eligible voters		4,244		
Conservative hold		Swing		–1.62
Source: Elections Ontario

1911 Ontario general election
Party	Candidate	Votes	%	±%
Conservative	Armstrong Musgrove	2,210	53.21	+1.28
Liberal	William Henry Kerr	1,943	46.79	–1.28
Total valid votes		4,153	99.76	
Total rejected ballots		10	0.24	–0.23
Turnout		4,163	80.95	–12.17
Eligible voters		5,143		
Conservative hold		Swing		+1.28
Source: Elections Ontario

1908 Ontario general election
Party	Candidate	Votes	%
Conservative	Armstrong Musgrove	2,292	51.94
Liberal	John T. Currie	2,121	48.06
Total valid votes		4,413	99.53
Total rejected ballots		21	0.47
Turnout		4,434	93.11
Eligible voters		4,762	
Conservative pickup new district.			
Source: Elections Ontario

=== 1867–1874 ===
1871 Ontario general election
Party	Candidate	Votes	%	±%
Liberal	Thomas Gibson	2,259	55.86	+6.66
Conservative	William Torrance Hays	1,785	44.14	−6.66
Turnout		4,044	68.67	−3.81
Eligible voters		5,889		
Liberal gain from Conservative		Swing		+6.66
Source: Elections Ontario

1867 Ontario general election
Party	Candidate	Votes	%
Conservative	William Torrance Hays	2,030	50.80
Liberal	Thomas Gibson	1,966	49.20
Total valid votes		3,996	72.48
Eligible voters		5,513	
Conservative pickup new district.			
Source: Elections Ontario

== See also ==
- List of Ontario provincial electoral districts
- Canadian provincial electoral districts
