= Jack Riddell =

Canadian politician (1931–2024)

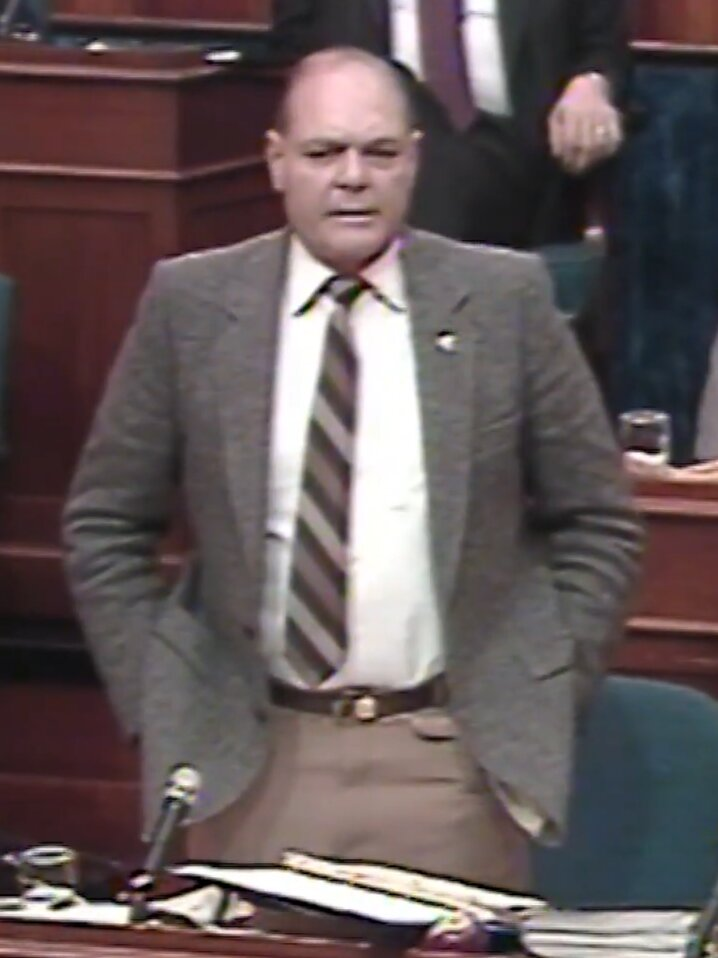
- Riddell in 1986

Minister of Agriculture and Food
- In office June 26, 1985 – August 2, 1989
- Premier: David Peterson
- Preceded by: K. Ross Stevenson
- Succeeded by: David Ramsay

Ontario MPP
- In office 1973 – September 6, 1990
- Preceded by: Charles MacNaughton
- Succeeded by: Paul Klopp
- Constituency: Huron/Huron—Middlesex (Note: Huron: 1973–1975; Huron—Middlesex: 1975–1987; Huron: 1987–1990.)

Personal details
- Born: December 10, 1931 London, Ontario, Canada
- Died: January 23, 2024 (aged 92) Exeter, Ontario, Canada
- Party: Liberal
- Spouses: Leone Bryan (div. 1981) Anita Morta (died 2023)
- Children: 5
- Education: Ontario Agricultural College
- Occupation: Teacher, livestock sales barn owner/operator, and auctioneer

John Keith Riddell (December 10, 1931 – January 23, 2024) was a Canadian politician in Ontario. He served as a Member of the Provincial Parliament (MPP) in the Legislative Assembly of Ontario from 1973 to 1990, representing Huron and Huron—Middlesex for the provincial Liberal Party. He was also Minister of Agriculture and Food from 1985 to 1989 in the government of David Peterson.

== Early life ==
Riddell was born in London, Ontario, on December 10, 1931. He was educated at the Ontario Agricultural College in Guelph, and worked as a high school teacher, livestock sales owner, and operator-auctioneer.

== Political career ==
Riddell was first elected to the Ontario legislature in a by-election on March 16, 1973, defeating Progressive Conservative candidate Don Southcott by 2,968 votes in the riding of Huron. He was re-elected by somewhat narrower margins in the elections of 1975, 1977, and 1981, in the redistributed riding of Huron—Middlesex.

During the Fleck Strike of 1978, Riddell visited the plant on March 20 and, after a half hour tour, walked to the picket line and threatened the strikers with the closure of the plant unless they ended the strike. The Ontario Labour Relations Board ruled that this constituted a breach of the Labour Relations Act.

The Liberals formed a minority government following the 1985 provincial election, after having been out of power for 42 years. Riddell, re-elected without difficulty, was appointed Minister of Agriculture and Food on June 26, 1985, succeeding Ross Stevenson. In that capacity, Riddell helped establish the Ontario Family Farm Interest Rate Reduction program to lower interest payments (which were more than 20%), and also created over 30 new programs for farmers. He expressed his concern that the 1988 Canada–United States Free Trade Agreement would be detrimental to farmers in Ontario, estimating that they could lose C$95 million, as well as lower food quality. During his tenure as minister, he frequently clashed with the Ontario Federation of Agriculture (OFA) over its efforts to establish a funding mechanism for general farm groups and amend the farm property tax rebate program. The OFA also disputed Riddell's statement to the legislative assembly that the government was adequately consulting the farm sector on the latter issue.

Riddell was on the traditionalist, right-of-centre faction of the Liberal Party and represented agricultural interests in the legislature. He apologized to the legislative assembly in July 1985, after opining that Larry Grossman (who was Jewish and running to be leader of the Progressive Conservatives) would find it challenging to garner support in rural Ontario because "there still is a racist feeling" in those areas, but resisted calls to resign. Two years later, Riddell tabled a private "right-to-farm" bill – the Farm Practices Protection Act – in an attempt to protect farmers against urban incursion and related matters. Easily re-elected again in the 1987 provincial election, he remained agriculture minister until August 2, 1989, when he was replaced by David Ramsay. Riddell announced in June 1990 that he was not going to run for re-election in the snap election that September. At the time, he was the second-longest serving Liberal MPP after Robert Nixon, having spent 17 years in the provincial legislature.

=== Cabinet positions ===
Peterson ministry, Province of Ontario (1985–1990)
Cabinet post (1)
Predecessor	Office	Successor
Ross Stevenson	Minister of Agriculture and Food; 1985–1989	David Ramsay

== Later life ==
After retiring from politics, Riddell intended to serve in a new ambassadorial post to instruct American lawmakers on the complexities of agriculture in the province, which was to be established by Premier David Peterson before the Liberals' unexpected defeat in the 1990 election. In September 1996, Riddell co-chaired a provincial fundraising committee in a bid to keep the Ontario Agriculture Museum in Milton open, after its funding from the provincial government was slashed. He was president of the Ontario Agricultural Hall of Fame Association from 2003 to 2004 and was also president of the Ontario Institute of Agrologists.

Riddell was inducted into the Ontario Agriculture Hall of Fame on June 11, 2017. Two years later, his family established a scholarship in his honour for seniors in the Avon Maitland District School Board who demonstrate "academic and leadership skills in their community" and will study agriculture in Canada.

== Personal life ==
Riddell was married to Leone Bryan for almost three decades until 1981. Together, they had five children and lived on a farm in Exeter, Ontario, from 1967 onwards. After they divorced, he married Anita Morta, who worked as his secretary at the Ontario legislature. They remained married until her death in September 2023.

Riddell died on January 23, 2024, at a nursing home in Exeter at age 92.
