= Huron—Bruce (provincial electoral district) =

Provincial electoral district in Ontario, Canada

Coordinates: 44.0°N 81.4°W

Ontario electoral district
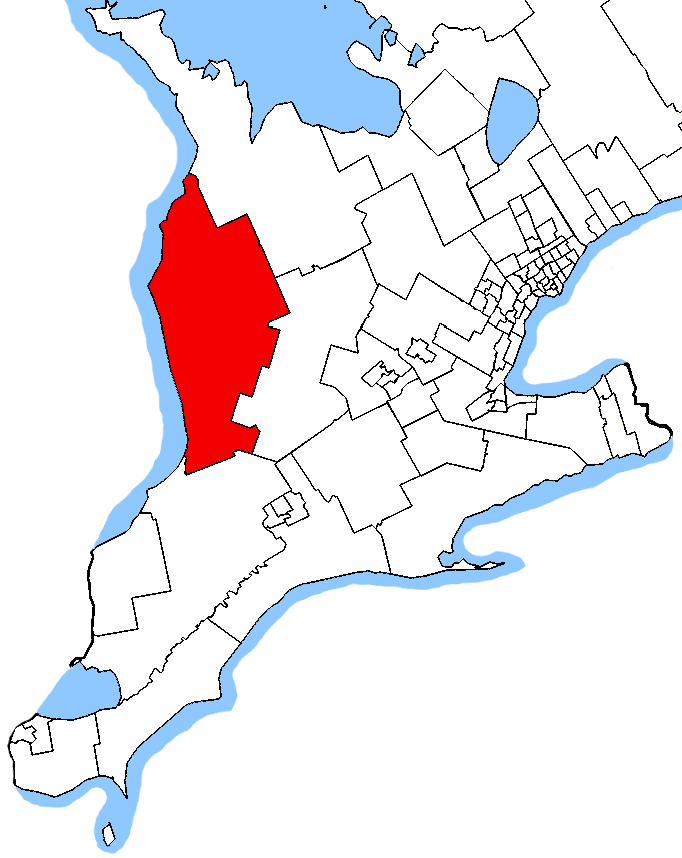
- Huron—Bruce in relation to southern Ontario ridings

Provincial electoral district
- Legislature: Legislative Assembly of Ontario
MPP
Lisa Thompson
Progressive Conservative
- First contested: 1934
- Last contested: 2025

Demographics
- Population (2016): 106,570
- Electors (2018): 84,157
- Area (km²): 6,001
- Pop. density (per km²): 17.8
- Census division(s): Bruce, Huron
- Census subdivision(s): Ashfield-Colborne-Wawanosh, Bluewater, Brockton, Central Huron, Howick, Huron East, Goderich, Huron-Kinloss, Kincardine, Morris-Turnberry, North Huron, Saugeen Shores, South Bruce, South Huron

Huron—Bruce is a provincial electoral district in Ontario, Canada, that has been represented in the Legislative Assembly of Ontario from 1934 to 1987, and again since 1999.

== Members of Provincial Parliament ==
Huron—Bruce
Assembly	Years	Member	Party
Upon Huron North and Bruce South being replaced by Huron and Huron-Brunce
19th	1934–1937	Charles Robertson	Liberal
20th	1937–1940	Charles Robertson	Liberal
21st	1943–1945	John William Hanna	Progressive Conservative
22nd	1945–1948	John William Hanna	Progressive Conservative
23rd	1948–1951	John William Hanna	Progressive Conservative
24th	1951–1955	John William Hanna	Progressive Conservative
25th	1955–1959	John William Hanna	Progressive Conservative
26th	1959–1962	John William Hanna	Progressive Conservative
26th	1962–1963	Murray Gaunt	Liberal
27th	1963–1967	Murray Gaunt	Liberal
28th	1967–1971	Murray Gaunt	Liberal
29th	1971–1975	Murray Gaunt	Liberal
30th	1975–1977	Murray Gaunt	Liberal
31st	1977–1981	Murray Gaunt	Liberal
32nd	1981–1985	Murray Elston	Liberal
33rd	1985–1987	Murray Elston	Liberal
Distributed to Huron & Bruce
Re-constituted from Huron & Bruce; Huron—Bruce
37th	1999–2003	Helen Johns	Progressive Conservative
38th	2003–2007	Carol Mitchell	Liberal
39th	2007–2011	Carol Mitchell	Liberal
40th	2011–2014	Lisa Thompson	Progressive Conservative
41st	2014–2018	Lisa Thompson	Progressive Conservative
42nd	2018–2022	Lisa Thompson	Progressive Conservative
43rd	2022–present	Lisa Thompson	Progressive Conservative

Following the death of Liberal Charles Robertson in March 1940, no byelection was called to fill this an other vacancies due to ongoing World War II. Premier Mitchell Hepburn had secured agreement from the opposition to extend parliamentary term beyond 1942 and not hold elections for a year in April 1942. Upon a legal application by a citizen William Temple (later CCF MPP who defeated Premier George Drew in his own riding), CCF leader Ted Jolliffe opted to back the appeal and said that he would appeal the decision to the Supreme Court but no further action was taken before the 1943 election was called.

== Election results ==
Winning party in each polling division of Huron—Bruce at the 2025 Ontario general election

2025 Ontario general election
Party	Candidate	Votes	%	±%
Progressive Conservative	Lisa Thompson	24,461	50.02	–1.95
Liberal	Ian Burbidge	13,703	28.02	+9.31
New Democratic	Nick McGregor	5,739	11.74	–4.64
Green	Matthew Van Ankum	2,727	5.58	+1.48
New Blue	Zack Weiler	2,065	4.22	–2.99
Ontario Alliance	Bruce Eisen	206	0.42	+0.26
Total valid votes		48,901	99.25	
Total rejected, unmarked and declined ballots		368	0.75	+0.16
Turnout		49,269	54.86	+0.70
Eligible voters		89,807		
Progressive Conservative hold		Swing		–5.63
Source: Elections Ontario

Winning party in each polling division of Huron—Bruce at the 2022 Ontario general election

2022 Ontario general election
Party	Candidate	Votes	%	±%	Expenditures
Progressive Conservative	Lisa Thompson	24,369	51.97	–0.39	$68,075
Liberal	Shelley Blackmore	8,775	18.71	+4.78	$32,861
New Democratic	Laurie Hazzard	7,679	16.38	–12.65	$42,759
New Blue	Matt Kennedy	3,384	7.22	–	$19,069
Green	Matthew Van Ankum	1,922	4.10	+0.68	$3,276
Ontario Party	Gerrie Huenemoerder	474	1.01	+0.50	$680
Independent	Ronald Stephens	212	0.45	–0.30	$0
Ontario Alliance	Bruce Eisen	77	0.16	–0.35	$0
Total valid votes/expense limit		46,892	99.41	–	$121,926
Total rejected, unmarked and declined ballots		277	0.59	–0.62	
Turnout		47,169	54.16	–9.35	
Eligible voters		87,090			
Progressive Conservative hold		Swing		–2.59	
Source: Elections Ontario

2018 Ontario general election
Party	Candidate	Votes	%	±%
Progressive Conservative	Lisa Thompson	27,646	52.36	+13.35
New Democratic	Jan Johnstone	15,326	29.03	+6.18
Liberal	Don Matheson	7,356	13.93	–16.93
Green	Nicholas Wendler	1,804	3.42	–0.06
Libertarian	Ron Stephens	399	0.76	+0.08
Alliance	Gerrie Huenemoerder	271	0.51	–
Total valid votes		52,802	98.79	
Total rejected, unmarked and declined ballots		646	1.21	–0.38
Turnout		53,448	63.51	+3.55
Eligible voters		84,157		
Progressive Conservative hold		Swing		+3.59
Source: Elections Ontario

2014 Ontario general election
Party	Candidate	Votes	%	±%
Progressive Conservative	Lisa Thompson	18,512	39.01	–3.75
Liberal	Colleen Schenk	14,647	30.86	–1.89
New Democratic	Jan Johnstone	10,843	22.85	+2.00
Green	Adam Werstine	1,651	3.48	+1.75
Family Coalition	Andrew Zettel	1,353	2.85	+1.39
Libertarian	Max Maister	323	0.68	–
Equal Parenting	Dennis Valenta	128	0.27	–0.18
Total valid votes		47,457	98.41	
Total rejected, unmarked and declined ballots		765	1.59	+1.20
Turnout		48,222	59.96	+0.73
Eligible voters		80,428		
Progressive Conservative hold		Swing		–0.93
Source: Elections Ontario

2011 Ontario general election
Party	Candidate	Votes	%	±%	Expenditures
Progressive Conservative	Lisa Thompson	19,138	42.76	+12.22	$81,890.60
Liberal	Carol Mitchell	14,659	32.75	–13.19	$79,935.51
New Democratic	Grant Robertson	9,329	20.85	+7.53	$32,102.53
Green	Patrick Main	772	1.72	–4.81	$881.40
Family Coalition	Christine Schnurr	656	1.47	–0.86	$14,592.60
Independent	Dennis Valenta	200	0.45	–0.44	$0
Total valid votes/expense limit		44,754	99.62	–	$90,268.64
Total rejected, unmarked and declined ballots		172	0.38	–0.08	
Turnout		44,926	59.23	–0.57	
Eligible voters		75,853			
Progressive Conservative gain from Liberal		Swing		+12.71	
Source: Elections Ontario

2007 Ontario general election
Party	Candidate	Votes	%	±%	Expenditures
Liberal	Carol Mitchell	20,469	45.95	+0.15	$49,205.00
Progressive Conservative	Rob Morley	13,606	30.54	–7.68	$72,311.76
New Democratic	Paul Klopp	5,932	13.32	+1.86	$20,183.39
Green	Victoria Serda	2,911	6.53	+4.38	$7,787.36
Family Coalition	Dave Joslin	1,035	2.32	+0.25	$8,064.77
Independent	Dennis Valenta	393	0.88	–	$9,887.73
Independent	Ronald John Stephens	202	0.45	–	$0
Total valid votes/expense limit		44,548	99.53	–	$80,832.60
Total rejected, unmarked and declined ballots		209	0.47	–0.02	
Turnout		44,757	59.80	–6.66	
Eligible voters		74,845			
Liberal hold		Swing		+3.92	
Source: Elections Ontario

2003 Ontario general election
Party	Candidate	Votes	%	±%	Expenditures
Liberal	Carol Mitchell	19,879	45.79	+3.96	$43,587.07
Progressive Conservative	Helen Johns	16,594	38.23	–7.53	$68,667.03
New Democratic	Grant I. Robertson	4,973	11.46	+2.33	$18,246.88
Green	Shelley Hannah	934	2.15	–	$3,146.98
Family Coalition	Dave Joslin	902	2.08	–1.21	$7,273.45
Freedom	Robert Sabharwal	127	0.29	–	$0
Total valid votes/expense limit		43,409	99.51	–	$63,013.44
Total rejected, unmarked and declined ballots		212	0.49	–0.80	
Turnout		43,621	66.46	–0.32	
Eligible voters		65,639			
Liberal gain from Progressive Conservative		Swing		+5.74	
Source: Elections Ontario

1999 Ontario general election
Party	Candidate	Votes	%	Expenditures
Progressive Conservative	Helen Johns	20,772	45.75	$60,434.00
Liberal	Ross Lamont	18,993	41.83	$36,010.47
New Democratic	Tony McQuail	4,142	9.12	$19,753.75
Family Coalition	Linda Freiburger	1,494	3.29	$6,769.68
Total valid votes/expense limit		45,401	98.72	$66,118.08
Total rejected, unmarked and declined ballots		591	1.29	
Turnout		45,992	66.78	
Eligible voters		68,873		
Liberal pickup new district.				
Source: Elections Ontario

=== 1934–1987 ===
1985 Ontario general election
Party	Candidate	Votes	%	±%
Liberal	Murray Elston	17,159	61.94	+15.31
Progressive Conservative	Mike Snobelen	8,550	30.87	–14.91
New Democratic	Norma Peterson	1,992	7.19	–0.40
Total valid votes		27,701	99.64	
Total rejected ballots		100	0.36	+0.14
Turnout		27,801	71.66	+1.54
Eligible voters		38,794		
Liberal hold		Swing		+15.11
Source: Elections Ontario

1981 Ontario general election
Party	Candidate	Votes	%	±%
Liberal	Murray Elston	12,164	46.64	–18.53
Progressive Conservative	Garry A. Harron	11,940	45.78	+17.53
New Democratic	Tony McQuail	1,979	7.59	+1.00
Total valid votes		26,083	99.78	
Total rejected ballots		57	0.22	+0.03
Turnout		26,140	70.12	–4.03
Eligible voters		37,278		
Liberal hold		Swing		–18.03
Source: Elections Ontario

1977 Ontario general election
Party	Candidate	Votes	%	±%
Liberal	Murray Gaunt	17,356	65.17	–0.54
Progressive Conservative	N. J. Sam MacGregor	7,523	28.25	+4.50
New Democratic	David A. Zyluk	1,754	6.59	–3.96
Total valid votes		26,633	99.81	
Total rejected ballots		51	0.19	–0.08
Turnout		26,684	74.15	+0.68
Eligible voters		35,985		
Liberal hold		Swing		–2.52
Source: Elections Ontario

1975 Ontario general election
Party	Candidate	Votes	%	±%
Liberal	Murray Gaunt	16,276	65.70	–1.90
Progressive Conservative	William E. Walden	5,883	23.75	+3.22
New Democratic	Donald A. Milne	2,613	10.55	–1.32
Total valid votes		24,772	99.73	
Total rejected ballots		68	0.27	–0.46
Turnout		24,840	73.47	–5.66
Eligible voters		33,810		
Liberal hold		Swing		–2.56
Source: Elections Ontario

1971 Ontario general election
Party	Candidate	Votes	%	±%
Liberal	Murray Gaunt	12,374	67.60	+10.50
Progressive Conservative	Lon Boyce	3,758	20.53	–16.71
New Democratic	Donald A. Milne	2,172	11.87	+6.21
Total valid votes		18,304	99.27	
Total rejected ballots		135	0.73	–0.00
Turnout		18,439	79.13	–2.94
Eligible voters		23,303		
Liberal hold		Swing		+13.61
Source: Elections Ontario

1967 Ontario general election
Party	Candidate	Votes	%	±%
Liberal	Murray Gaunt	9,166	57.10	+6.99
Progressive Conservative	Roger West	5,978	37.24	–12.65
New Democratic	Jack Pym	908	5.66	–
Total valid votes		16,052	99.26	
Total rejected ballots		119	0.74	+0.20
Turnout		16,171	82.07	+0.38
Eligible voters		19,705		
Liberal hold		Swing		+9.82
Source: Elections Ontario

1963 Ontario general election
Party	Candidate	Votes	%	±%
Liberal	Murray Gaunt	6,359	50.11	–2.57
Progressive Conservative	George McCutcheon	6,331	49.89	+2.57
Total valid votes		12,690	99.47	
Total rejected ballots		68	0.53	+0.05
Turnout		12,758	81.69	–2.53
Eligible voters		15,618		
Liberal hold		Swing		–2.57
Source: Elections Ontario

Ontario provincial by-election, October 4, 1962 Death of John William Hanna
Party	Candidate	Votes	%	±%
Liberal	Murray Gaunt	6,907	52.68	+8.11
Progressive Conservative	George McCutcheon	6,203	47.32	–8.11
Total valid votes		13,110	99.52	
Total rejected ballots		63	0.48	–0.20
Turnout		13,173	84.22	+7.70
Eligible voters		15,641		
Liberal gain from Progressive Conservative		Swing		+8.11
Source: Elections Ontario

1959 Ontario general election
Party	Candidate	Votes	%	±%
Progressive Conservative	John William Hanna	6,683	55.42	–0.24
Liberal	Rae J. Watson	5,375	44.58	+0.24
Total valid votes		12,058	99.32	
Total rejected ballots		82	0.68	–0.21
Turnout		12,140	76.53	–4.65
Eligible voters		15,864		
Progressive Conservative hold		Swing		–0.24
Source: Elections Ontario

1955 Ontario general election
Party	Candidate	Votes	%	±%
Progressive Conservative	John William Hanna	7,244	55.67	–2.81
Liberal	Hugh Hill	5,769	44.33	+2.81
Total valid votes		13,013	99.12	
Total rejected ballots		116	0.88	+0.24
Turnout		13,129	81.18	+4.06
Eligible voters		16,173		
Progressive Conservative hold		Swing		–2.81
Source: Elections Ontario

1951 Ontario general election
Party	Candidate	Votes	%	±%
Progressive Conservative	John William Hanna	7,431	58.48	+7.51
Liberal	Elmer J. Farrish	5,276	41.52	–7.51
Total valid votes		12,707	99.36	
Total rejected ballots		82	0.64	+0.13
Turnout		12,789	77.12	+1.62
Eligible voters		16,583		
Progressive Conservative hold		Swing		+7.51
Source: Elections Ontario

1948 Ontario general election
Party	Candidate	Votes	%	±%
Progressive Conservative	John William Hanna	6,678	50.97	–1.60
Liberal	Hugh Hill	6,423	49.03	+12.32
Total valid votes		13,101	99.49	
Total rejected ballots		67	0.51	+0.05
Turnout		13,168	75.50	–0.11
Eligible voters		17,441		
Progressive Conservative hold		Swing		–6.96
Source: Elections Ontario

1945 Ontario general election
Party	Candidate	Votes	%	±%
Progressive Conservative	John William Hanna	7,188	52.57	+14.57
Liberal	William John MacKay	5,019	36.71	+0.00
Co-operative Commonwealth	William C. King	1,465	10.72	–14.57
Total valid votes		13,672	99.54	
Total rejected ballots		63	0.46	+0.30
Turnout		13,735	75.61	+9.22
Eligible voters		18,165		
Progressive Conservative hold		Swing		+7.29
Source: Elections Ontario

1943 Ontario general election
Party	Candidate	Votes	%	±%
Progressive Conservative	John William Hanna	4,588	38.00	+4.00
Liberal	Hugh Hill	4,432	36.71	–24.37
Co-operative Commonwealth	Henry F. Lantz	3,053	25.29	–
Total valid votes		12,073	99.84	
Total rejected ballots		19	0.16	–0.52
Turnout		12,092	66.39	–7.64
Eligible voters		18,214		
Progressive Conservative gain from Liberal		Swing		+14.19
Source: Elections Ontario

1937 Ontario general election
Party	Candidate	Votes	%	±%
Liberal	Charles Alexander Robertson	8,587	61.08	–4.70
Conservative	William Henry Logan	4,780	34.00	–0.22
Independent Liberal	Henry T. Thompson	470	3.34	–
Independent Conservative	Thomas John McLean	222	1.58	–
Total valid votes		14,059	99.32	
Total rejected ballots		96	0.68	+0.34
Turnout		14,155	74.03	+0.78
Eligible voters		19,121		
Liberal hold		Swing		+2.46
Source: Elections Ontario

1934 Ontario general election
Party	Candidate	Votes	%
Liberal	Charles Alexander Robertson	9,591	65.78
Conservative	Foster Graham Moffatt	4,989	34.22
Total valid votes		14,580	99.66
Total rejected ballots		50	0.34
Turnout		14,630	73.25
Eligible voters		19,972	
Liberal pickup new district.			
Source: Elections Ontario

== 2007 electoral reform referendum ==
2007 Ontario electoral reform referendum
Side	Votes	%
First Past the Post	30,831	71.5
Mixed member proportional	12,312	28.5
Total valid votes	43,143	100.0

== See also ==
- List of Ontario provincial electoral districts
- Canadian provincial electoral districts
