= John William Hanna =

Canadian politician

Member of the Legislative Assembly of Ontario
- In office 1943 – March 23, 1962
- Preceded by: Charles Alexander Robertson
- Succeeded by: Murray Gaunt
- Constituency: Huron—Bruce

Mayor of Wingham

Personal details
- Born: August 28, 1889 Wingham, Ontario, Canada
- Died: March 23, 1962 (aged 72) Ontario, Canada
- Party: Progressive Conservative
- Occupation: Merchant, car dealer, politician

John William Hanna (August 28, 1889 – March 23, 1962) was an Ontario merchant and political figure. He represented Huron—Bruce in the Legislative Assembly of Ontario from 1943 to 1962 as a Progressive Conservative member.

He was born in Wingham, Ontario, the son of John Hanna, and educated there. He took over ownership of the family store; he also operated a car dealership and was involved in horse racing. In 1917, he married Margaret Esther Campbell. Hanna served as mayor of Wingham for a number of years. In 1926, Hanna sold part of the business to Walker Stores Ltd. He died in office in 1962. The Old Hanna Store 258 Josephine Street is now BabyBoom Trading Post which still uses the store and residence.
