= William Torrance Hays =

Canadian politician

William Torrance Hays (September 7, 1837 – June 27, 1875) was a Canadian politician. He represented Huron North in the Legislative Assembly of Ontario as a Conservative member from 1867 to 1871.

He was born in Wilmot (later Haysville) in Upper Canada in 1837, the son of Irish immigrants. He became an attorney in 1862. He was captain in the local militia and served on the town council for Goderich.

== Electoral history ==
1867 Ontario general election: Huron North
Party	Candidate	Votes	%
Conservative	William Torrance Hays	2,030	50.80
Liberal	Thomas Gibson	1,966	49.20
Total valid votes		3,996	72.48
Eligible voters		5,513	
Conservative pickup new district.			
Source: Elections Ontario

1871 Ontario general election: Huron North
Party	Candidate	Votes	%	±%
Liberal	Thomas Gibson	2,259	55.86	+6.66
Conservative	William Torrance Hays	1,785	44.14	−6.66
Turnout		4,044	68.67	−3.81
Eligible voters		5,889		
Liberal gain from Conservative		Swing		+6.66
Source: Elections Ontario
