= Thomas Pryde =

Canadian politician

Thomas L. Pryde

MPP for Huron
- In office February 18, 1948 – January 5, 1958
- Preceded by: Robert Hobbs Taylor
- Succeeded by: Charles MacNaughton

Personal details
- Born: October 26, 1888 Largoward, Fife, Scotland
- Died: January 5, 1958 (aged 69) Exeter, Ontario, Canada
- Party: Ontario Progressive Conservative Party
- Occupation: businessman

Thomas Pryde (October 26, 1888 – January 5, 1958) was a Scottish-Canadian politician who was a Member of Provincial Parliament in Legislative Assembly of Ontario from 1945 to 1958. He represented the riding of Huron for the Ontario Progressive Conservative Party. He was born in Largoward, Fife, Scotland and was a businessman. He died in office in 1958.
