= Barb Fisher =

Canadian politician

Member of the Ontario Provincial Parliament for Bruce
- In office June 8, 1995 – June 3, 1999
- Preceded by: Murray Elston
- Succeeded by: Riding dissolved

Personal details
- Born: 1951 (age 74–75) Ottawa, Ontario, Canada
- Party: Progressive Conservative
- Occupation: Civil servant

Barbara Fisher (born c. 1951) is a former politician in Ontario, Canada. She was a Progressive Conservative member of the Legislative Assembly of Ontario from 1995 to 1999 and ran as a Conservative for the House of Commons of Canada in 2004.

== Background ==
Fisher was the manager of the Bruce Community Development Corporation before entering politics.

== Politics ==
She served as town councillor, reeve of Kincardine, and county councillor within the Bruce area prior to 1995.

In the 1995 provincial election, she was elected as a Progressive Conservative in riding of Bruce, defeating Liberal Bruce Lauckner by 2,676 votes. Fisher served as a backbench supporter of the government of Mike Harris for the next four years.

The Harris government reduced the number of provincial constituencies from 130 to 103 in 1996, and many sitting MPPs were forced to run against each other. Fisher ran for the Progressive Conservative nomination in the new riding of Huron—Bruce, but lost to Helen Johns. She later worked as manager of the Brockton Response Center, and in this capacity helped to distribute government money compensating the victims of the Walkerton tainted water tragedy.

In the 2004 federal election, Fisher ran in Huron—Bruce as a candidate of the Conservative Party, but lost to Liberal Paul Steckle by almost 10,000 votes.

She was an election strategist for the Progressive Conservative Party in the 2007 provincial election.

She ran and was elected mayor of Kincardine in the 2026 Ontario municipal elections.
