= Bruce (Ontario provincial electoral district) =

Former provincial electoral district in Ontario, Canada

Bruce (1934-1967), (1987-1999)
Ontario electoral district

Defunct provincial electoral district
- Legislature: Legislative Assembly of Ontario
- District created: 1934
- District abolished: 1996
- First contested: 1934
- Last contested: 1995

Bruce was a provincial riding in Ontario, Canada, that was created for the 1934 election. It was merged into Grey-Bruce prior to the 1967 election but was recreated in 1987. It was abolished a second time prior to the 1999 election. It was merged into the riding of Bruce—Grey.

== Members of Provincial Parliament ==
Bruce
Assembly	Years	Member	Party
Riding created from Bruce North and Bruce South
19th	1934–1937	John William Sinclair (Note: In 1938, the title of Member of the Legislative Assembly was officially changed to Member of Provincial Parliament. Previously, it was unofficially used in the media and in the Legislature.)	Liberal
20th	1937–1943	John William Sinclair	Liberal
21st	1943–1945	Thomas Neil Duff	Liberal
22nd	1945–1948	John Philemon Johnstone	Progressive Conservative
23rd	1948–1951	T. Kenzie Foster	Liberal
24th	1951–1955	John Philemon Johnstone	Progressive Conservative
25th	1955–1959	Ross Whicher	Liberal
26th	1959–1963	Ross Whicher	Liberal
27th	1963–1967	Ross Whicher	Liberal
Riding dissolved into Grey—Bruce and Huron—Bruce
Riding recreated from Grey—Bruce and Huron—Bruce
34th	1987–1990	Murray Elston	Liberal
35th	1990–1994	Murray Elston	Liberal
36th	1995–1999	Barbara Fisher	Progressive Conservative
Sourced from the Ontario Legislative Assembly
Merged into Bruce—Grey—Owen Sound and Huron—Bruce

== Election results ==
1995 Ontario general election
Party	Candidate	Votes	%	±%
Progressive Conservative	Barb Fisher	13,680	42.70	+18.55
Liberal	Bruce Lauckner	11,004	34.35	–3.37
New Democratic	Robert Emerson	4,269	13.33	–12.85
Family Coalition	John Clark	2,787	8.70	–3.26
Green	Catherine Young	296	0.92	–
Total valid votes		32,036	99.23	
Total rejected, unmarked and declined ballots		249	0.77	–0.01
Turnout		32,285	69.34	+0.42
Eligible voters		46,559		
Progressive Conservative gain from Liberal		Swing		+10.96
Source: Elections Ontario

1990 Ontario general election
Party	Candidate	Votes	%	±%
Liberal	Murray Elston	11,476	37.71	–23.02
New Democratic	Leonard A. Hope	7,965	26.18	+12.12
Progressive Conservative	Terry Halpin	7,349	24.15	+6.01
Family Coalition	Linda Freiburger	3,639	11.96	+4.89
Total valid votes		30,429	99.22	
Total rejected, unmarked and declined ballots		240	0.78	+0.33
Turnout		30,669	68.92	+1.30
Eligible voters		44,499		
Liberal hold		Swing		–17.57
Source: Elections Ontario

1987 Ontario general election
Party	Candidate	Votes	%	±%
Liberal	Murray Elston	17,227	60.74	–
Progressive Conservative	Mike Snobelen	5,145	18.14	–
New Democratic	Norma Peterson	3,986	14.05	–
Family Coalition	Adrian Keet	2,006	7.07	–
Total valid votes		28,364	99.55	
Total rejected ballots		129	0.45	–
Turnout		28,493	67.62	–
Eligible voters		42,139		
Liberal hold		Swing		–
Source: Elections Ontario

=== 1934–1963 ===
1963 Ontario general election
Party	Candidate	Votes	%	±%
Liberal	Ross Whicher	7,997	53.61	–7.91
Progressive Conservative	Percy Pletsch	6,921	46.39	+7.91
Total valid votes		14,918	99.34	
Total rejected ballots		99	0.66	+0.08
Turnout		15,017	76.56	–0.69
Eligible voters		19,615		
Liberal hold		Swing		–7.91
Source: Elections Ontario

1959 Ontario general election
Party	Candidate	Votes	%	±%
Liberal	Ross Whicher	8,940	61.52	+7.09
Progressive Conservative	Lloyd Johnston	5,592	38.48	–3.82
Total valid votes		14,532	99.42	
Total rejected ballots		85	0.58	–0.25
Turnout		14,617	77.24	–6.16
Eligible voters		18,923		
Liberal hold		Swing		+5.46
Source: Elections Ontario

1955 Ontario general election
Party	Candidate	Votes	%	±%
Liberal	Ross Whicher	8,609	54.43	+9.82
Progressive Conservative	John Philemon Johnstone	6,691	42.30	–6.63
Co-operative Commonwealth	Aubrey John Mercer	518	3.27	–3.19
Total valid votes		15,818	99.17	
Total rejected ballots		133	0.83	+0.42
Turnout		15,951	83.40	+6.06
Eligible voters		19,126		
Liberal gain from Progressive Conservative		Swing		+8.23
Source: Elections Ontario

1951 Ontario general election
Party	Candidate	Votes	%	±%
Progressive Conservative	John Philemon Johnstone	7,369	48.93	+6.28
Liberal	T. Kenzie Foster	6,717	44.60	–2.20
Co-operative Commonwealth	Aubrey John Mercer	973	6.46	–4.07
Total valid votes		15,059	99.58	
Total rejected ballots		63	0.42	–0.03
Turnout		15,122	77.34	+2.90
Eligible voters		19,552		
Progressive Conservative gain from Liberal		Swing		+4.24
Source: Elections Ontario

1948 Ontario general election
Party	Candidate	Votes	%	±%
Liberal	T. Kenzie Foster	7,171	46.81	+3.51
Progressive Conservative	John Philemon Johnstone	6,535	42.66	–3.51
Co-operative Commonwealth	Aubrey John Mercer	1,614	10.54	–0.01
Total valid votes		15,320	99.55	
Total rejected ballots		69	0.45	+0.01
Turnout		15,389	74.45	–1.45
Eligible voters		20,671		
Liberal gain from Progressive Conservative		Swing		+3.51
Source: Elections Ontario

1945 Ontario general election
Party	Candidate	Votes	%	±%
Progressive Conservative	John Philemon Johnstone	7,229	46.16	+8.23
Liberal	Thomas Neil Duff	6,780	43.30	+4.79
Co-operative Commonwealth	Palmer L. Barton	1,651	10.54	–13.02
Total valid votes		15,660	99.56	
Total rejected ballots		69	0.44	–0.14
Turnout		15,729	75.89	+12.05
Eligible voters		20,725		
Progressive Conservative gain from Liberal		Swing		+1.72
Source: Elections Ontario

1943 Ontario general election
Party	Candidate	Votes	%	±%
Liberal	Thomas Neil Duff	5,066	38.51	–17.85
Progressive Conservative	John Philemon Johnstone	4,990	37.93	–5.71
Co-operative Commonwealth	George Moffatt Jamieson	3,100	23.56	–
Total valid votes		13,156	99.43	
Total rejected ballots		76	0.57	+0.03
Turnout		13,232	63.84	–9.18
Eligible voters		20,727		
Liberal hold		Swing		–6.07
Source: Elections Ontario

1937 Ontario general election
Party	Candidate	Votes	%	±%
Liberal	John William Sinclair	8,739	56.36	–3.71
Conservative	Andrew Ernest Robinson	6,767	43.64	+3.71
Total valid votes		15,506	99.45	
Total rejected ballots		85	0.55	–0.09
Turnout		15,591	73.02	–4.97
Eligible voters		21,353		
Liberal hold		Swing		–3.71
Source: Elections Ontario

1934 Ontario general election
Party	Candidate	Votes	%
Liberal	John William Sinclair	10,100	60.07
Conservative	Campbell Grant	6,713	39.93
Total valid votes		16,813	99.36
Total rejected ballots		108	0.64
Turnout		16,921	77.98
Eligible voters		21,699	
Liberal pickup new district.			
Source: Elections Ontario

== See also ==
- List of Ontario provincial electoral districts
- Canadian provincial electoral districts
