= Paul Klopp =

Canadian politician

Ontario MPP
- In office 1990–1995
- Preceded by: Jack Riddell
- Succeeded by: Helen Johns
- Constituency: Huron

Personal details
- Born: January 14, 1957 (age 69) Bluewater, Ontario, Canada
- Party: New Democratic
- Spouse: Heather Sweeney
- Children: TJ Klopp, Heidi Klopp
- Occupation: Farmer

Paul Klopp (born January 14, 1957) is a Canadian politician in Ontario, Canada. He was a New Democratic member of the Legislative Assembly of Ontario from 1990 to 1995 who represented the central Ontario riding of Huron. He served as deputy mayor of Bluewater, Ontario from 2001 to 2006 and again from 2010. In 2018, Paul was successful in his bid for the office of Mayor of Bluewater.

== Background ==
Klopp was born in Bluewater, Ontario. He graduated from Centralia College with a diploma in Agricultural Business Management. He married Heather Sweeney in 1984 and they purchased a nearby farm. He served as president of the Zurich Agricultural Society and the Huron County Federation of Agriculture, and was a municipal councillor in Hay Township.

== Politics ==
He ran for the Ontario Legislature in the provincial election of 1985, but finished third against Liberal Jack Riddell in the riding of Huron—Middlesex. He ran again in the provincial election of 1987 in the redistributed riding of Huron, and again finished third against Riddell.

The NDP won a majority government in the provincial election of 1990, and Klopp defeated Progressive Conservative candidate Ken Campbell by 954 votes in Huron. He served as parliamentary assistant to Agriculture Minister Elmer Buchanan from 1990 to 1995, the entirety of the Rae government's tenure in office. In early 1994, he announced that Huron and Perth Counties would receive almost two million dollars in jobsOntario grants.

The NDP were defeated in the provincial election of 1995, and Klopp finished third in Huron against Progressive Conservative Helen Johns. He returned to municipal politics after his defeat, and was deputy mayor of Bluewater for two terms from 2001 until 2006. In 2006, he lost a close election for deputy mayor to Dave Johnston.

He ran again for the NDP in the Huron-Bruce riding in the 2007 provincial election. He came third with 13% of the vote.

Klopp was again elected Deputy Mayor of the Municipality of Bluewater in 2010, defeating the incumbent, Dave Johnson, by about 700 votes. As member of the Huron County Federation of Agriculture, he is the past president of the Huron County Federation of Agriculture, past regional director, and director at large and chair of the finance committee. In his local community, Klopp is the past president and current board member of Zurich Agricultural Society, board member of Huron County Pork Producers, Director of Hay Communications and committee member of Ontario Soybean Growers’ Marketing Board.

In 2014, Klopp ran for Mayor of the Municipality of Bluewater in a four way race, and was defeated by Tyler Hessel. In 2018, Klopp was elected Mayor of the Municipality of Bluewater, defeating incumbent, Tyler Hessel by over 700 votes. He was acclaimed as Mayor of the Municipality of Bluewater in 2022.
