= Robert Hobbs Taylor =

Canadian politician

Robert Hobbs Taylor (December 20, 1893 – December 17, 1947) was a physician, surgeon and politician in Ontario, Canada. He represented Huron in the Legislative Assembly of Ontario from 1943 to 1947 as a Progressive Conservative. After an unsuccessful bid in the 1937 Ontario general election, Taylor was elected in 1943 and re-elected in 1945.

The son of William Taylor, a municipal politician, and Alicia Jane Hobbs, he was born in London, Ontario and was educated there and graduated from the University of Western Ontario in 1916. He pursued post-graduate studies in medicine and surgery at New York City, Philadelphia and Chicago. In 1928, Taylor married Letta Ruth Guenther. Taylor was chair of the public school board in Dashwood for 15 years.

He collapsed on the floor of the Ontario legislature during the 1945 session. Taylor died in office two years later following a heart attack at his home in Dashwood at the age of 53.
