= 27th Parliament of Ontario =

Legislative assembly from 1963 to 1967

The 27th Legislative Assembly of Ontario was in session from September 25, 1963, until September 5, 1967, just prior to the 1967 general election. The majority party was the Ontario Progressive Conservative Party led by John Robarts.

Donald Hugo Morrow served as speaker for the assembly.

== Members elected to the Assembly ==
Riding	Member	Party	First elected / previously elected	No. of terms	Notes
Algoma—Manitoulin	Stanley William Farquhar	Liberal	1963	1st term	
Armourdale	Gordon Carton	Progressive Conservative	1963	1st term	
Beaches	Robert John Harris	Progressive Conservative	1962	2nd term	
Bellwoods	John Yaremko	Progressive Conservative	1951	4th term	
Bracondale	Joseph M. Gould	Liberal	1959	2nd term	Died in 1965
Bracondale	George Ben (1965)	Liberal	1965	1st term	Elected in a by-election in 1965
Brant	Robert Fletcher Nixon	Liberal	1962	2nd term	
Brantford	George Thomas Gordon	Liberal	1948	5th term	
Bruce	Ross MacKenzie Whicher	Liberal	1955	3rd term	
Carleton	William Erskine Johnston	Progressive Conservative	1955	3rd term	
Cochrane North	René Brunelle	Progressive Conservative	1958	3rd term	
Cochrane South	Wilf Spooner	Progressive Conservative	1955	3rd term	
Don Mills	Stanley John Randall	Progressive Conservative	1963	1st term	
Dovercourt	Andy Thompson	Liberal	1959	2nd term	
Downsview	Vernon Milton Singer	Liberal	1959	2nd term	
Dufferin—Simcoe	Alfred Wallace Downer	Progressive Conservative	1937	8th term	
Durham	Hugh Alex Carruthers	Progressive Conservative	1959	2nd term	
Eglinton	Leonard Mackenzie Reilly	Progressive Conservative	1962	2nd term	
Elgin	Ronald Keith McNeil	Progressive Conservative	1958	3rd term	
Essex North	Arthur John Reaume	Liberal	1951	4th term	
Essex South	Donald Alexander Paterson	Liberal	1963	1st term	
Etobicoke	Leonard A. Braithwaite	Liberal	1963	1st term	
Forest Hill	Edward Arunah Dunlop	Progressive Conservative	1963	1st term	
Fort William	Edward George Freeman	New Democratic Party	1963	1st term	
Frontenac—Addington	John Richard Simonett	Progressive Conservative	1959	2nd term	
Glengarry	Osie Villeneuve	Progressive Conservative	1948, 1963	4th term*	
Grenville—Dundas	Frederick McIntosh Cass	Progressive Conservative	1955	3rd term	
Grey North	Edward Carson Sargent	Liberal	1963	1st term	
Grey South	Farquhar Robert Oliver	Liberal	1926 (Note: First elected as United Farmers)	11th term	
Haldimand—Norfolk	James Noble Allan	Progressive Conservative	1951	4th term	
Halton	George Albert Kerr	Progressive Conservative	1963	1st term	
Hamilton Centre	Ada Mary Pritchard	Progressive Conservative	1963	1st term	
Hamilton East	Norman Andrew Davison	New Democratic Party	1959	2nd term	
Hamilton—Wentworth	Thomas Ray Connell	Progressive Conservative	1951	4th term	
Hastings East	Clarke Rollins	Progressive Conservative	1959	2nd term	
Hastings West	Elmer Sandercock	Progressive Conservative	1948	5th term	
High Park	Alfred Hozack Cowling	Progressive Conservative	1951	4th term	
Humber	William Beverley Lewis	Progressive Conservative	1955	3rd term	
Huron	Charles Steel MacNaughton	Progressive Conservative	1958	3rd term	
Huron—Bruce	Murray Gaunt	Liberal	1962	2nd term	
Kenora	Robert Wayne Gibson	Liberal-Labour	1962	2nd term	Died in 1966
Kenora	Leo Edward Bernier (1966)	Progressive Conservative	1966	1st term	Elected in a by-election in 1966
Kent East	John Purvis Spence	Liberal	1955	3rd term	
Kent West	William Darcy McKeough	Progressive Conservative	1963	1st term	
Kingston	Charles Joseph Sylvanus Apps	Progressive Conservative	1963	1st term	
Lakeshore	Robert Alan Eagleson	Progressive Conservative	1963	1st term	
Lambton East	Lorne Charles Henderson	Progressive Conservative	1963	1st term	
Lambton West	John Ralph Knox	Progressive Conservative	1963	1st term	
Lanark	George Ellis Gomme	Progressive Conservative	1958	3rd term	
Leeds	James Auld	Progressive Conservative	1954	4th term	
Lincoln	Robert Stanley Welch	Progressive Conservative	1963	1st term	
London North	John Parmenter Robarts	Progressive Conservative	1951	4th term	
London South	John Howard White	Progressive Conservative	1959	2nd term	
Middlesex North	William Atcheson Stewart	Progressive Conservative	1957	3rd term	
Middlesex South	Neil Leverne Olde	Progressive Conservative	1963	1st term	
Muskoka	Robert James Boyer	Progressive Conservative	1955	3rd term	
Niagara Falls	George Bukator	Liberal	1959	2nd term	
Nickel Belt	Gaston Joseph Clement Demers	Progressive Conservative	1963	1st term	
Nipissing	Martin Leo Troy	Liberal	1959	2nd term	Died in 1965
Nipissing	Richard Stanley Smith (1965)	Liberal	1965	1st term	Elected in a by-election in 1965
Northumberland	Russell Daniel Rowe	Progressive Conservative	1963	1st term	
Ontario	Matthew Bulloch Dymond	Progressive Conservative	1955	3rd term	
Oshawa	Albert V. Walker	Progressive Conservative	1963	1st term	
Ottawa East	Horace S. Racine	Liberal	1963	1st term	
Ottawa South	Irwin Haskett	Progressive Conservative	1959	2nd term	
Ottawa West	Donald Hugo Morrow	Progressive Conservative	1948	5th term	
Oxford	Gordon William Pittock	Progressive Conservative	1963	1st term	
Parkdale	James Beecham Trotter	Liberal	1959	2nd term	
Parry Sound	Allister Johnston	Progressive Conservative	1948	5th term	
Peel	William Grenville Davis	Progressive Conservative	1959	2nd term	
Perth	James Frederick Edwards	Progressive Conservative	1945	6th term	
Peterborough	Keith Roy Brown	Progressive Conservative	1959	2nd term	
Port Arthur	George Calvin Wardrope	Progressive Conservative	1951	4th term	
Prescott	Louis-Pierre Cécile	Progressive Conservative	1948	5th term	
Prince Edward—Lennox	Norris Eldon Howe Whitney	Progressive Conservative	1951	4th term	
Rainy River	William George Noden	Progressive Conservative	1951	4th term	
Renfrew North	Maurice Hamilton	Progressive Conservative	1958	3rd term	
Renfrew South	Paul Joseph Yakabuski	Progressive Conservative	1963	1st term	
Riverdale	Robert William Macaulay (Note: resigned seat)	Progressive Conservative	1951	4th term	
Riverdale	Jim Renwick (1964)	New Democratic Party	1964	1st term	
Russell	Albert Benjamin Rutter Lawrence	Progressive Conservative	1963	1st term	
Sault Ste. Marie	Arthur Allison Wishart	Progressive Conservative	1963	1st term	
Scarborough Centre	George Henry Peck	Progressive Conservative	1963	1st term	
Scarborough East	Louis M. Hodgson	Progressive Conservative	1963	1st term	
Scarborough North	Thomas Leonard Wells	Progressive Conservative	1963	1st term	
Scarborough West	Stephen Henry Lewis	New Democratic Party	1963	1st term	
Simcoe Centre	David Arthur Evans	Progressive Conservative	1960	2nd term	
Simcoe East	Lloyd Averall Letherby	Progressive Conservative	1954	4th term	
St. Andrew	Allan Grossman	Progressive Conservative	1955	3rd term	
St. David	Henry James Price	Progressive Conservative	1955	3rd term	
St. George	Allan Frederick Lawrence	Progressive Conservative	1958	3rd term	
St. Patrick	Archibald Kelso Roberts	Progressive Conservative	1943, 1951	6th term*	
Stormont	Fernand Guindon	Progressive Conservative	1957	3rd term	
Sudbury	Elmer Walter Sopha	Liberal	1959	2nd term	
Timiskaming	Richard Allan Hugh Taylor	Liberal	1963	1st term	
Victoria	Ronald Glen Hodgson	Progressive Conservative	1963	1st term	
Waterloo North	Keith Elkington Butler	Progressive Conservative	1963	1st term	
Waterloo South	Allan Edward Reuter	Progressive Conservative	1963	1st term	
Welland	Ellis Price Morningstar	Progressive Conservative	1951	4th term	
Wellington South	Harry A. Worton	Liberal	1955	3rd term	
Wellington—Dufferin	John Henry Haines Root	Progressive Conservative	1951	4th term	
Wentworth	Donald William Ewen	Progressive Conservative	1963	1st term	
Wentworth East	Reg Gisborn	New Democratic Party	1955	3rd term	
Windsor—Sandwich	Maurice Lucien Bélanger	Liberal	1959	2nd term	
Windsor—Sandwich	Ivan Wilfred Thrasher (1964)	Progressive Conservative	1964	1st term	
Windsor—Walkerville	Bernard Newman	Liberal	1959	2nd term	
Woodbine	Kenneth Bryden	New Democratic Party	1959	2nd term	
York East	Hollis Edward Beckett	Progressive Conservative	1951	4th term	
York Mills	Dalton Bales	Progressive Conservative	1963	1st term	
York North	Addison Alexander MacKenzie	Progressive Conservative	1945	6th term	
York South	Donald Cameron MacDonald	New Democratic Party	1955	3rd term	
York West	Leslie Rowntree	Progressive Conservative	1956	3rd term	
Yorkview	Fred Matthews Young	New Democratic Party	1963	1st term	
