= 1934 Ontario general election =

Canadian provincial election

- June 19, 1934

90 seats in the 19th Legislative Assembly of Ontario 46 seats were needed for a majority
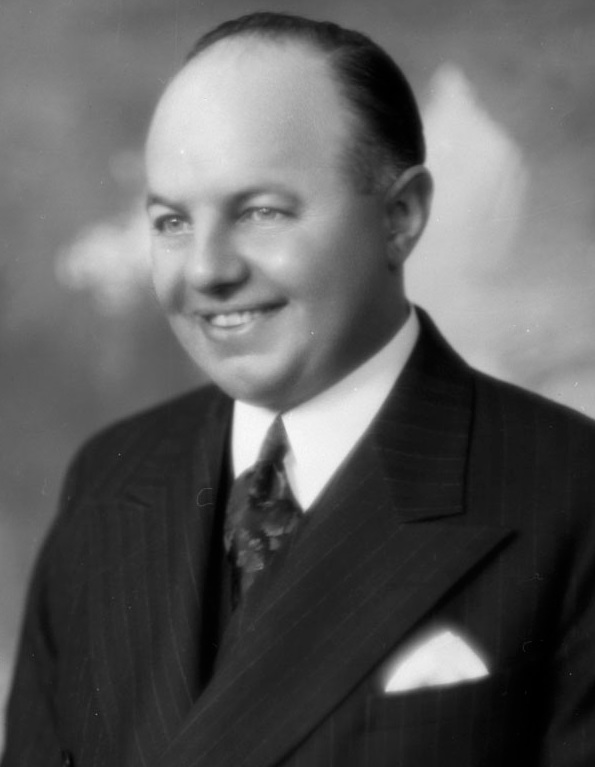

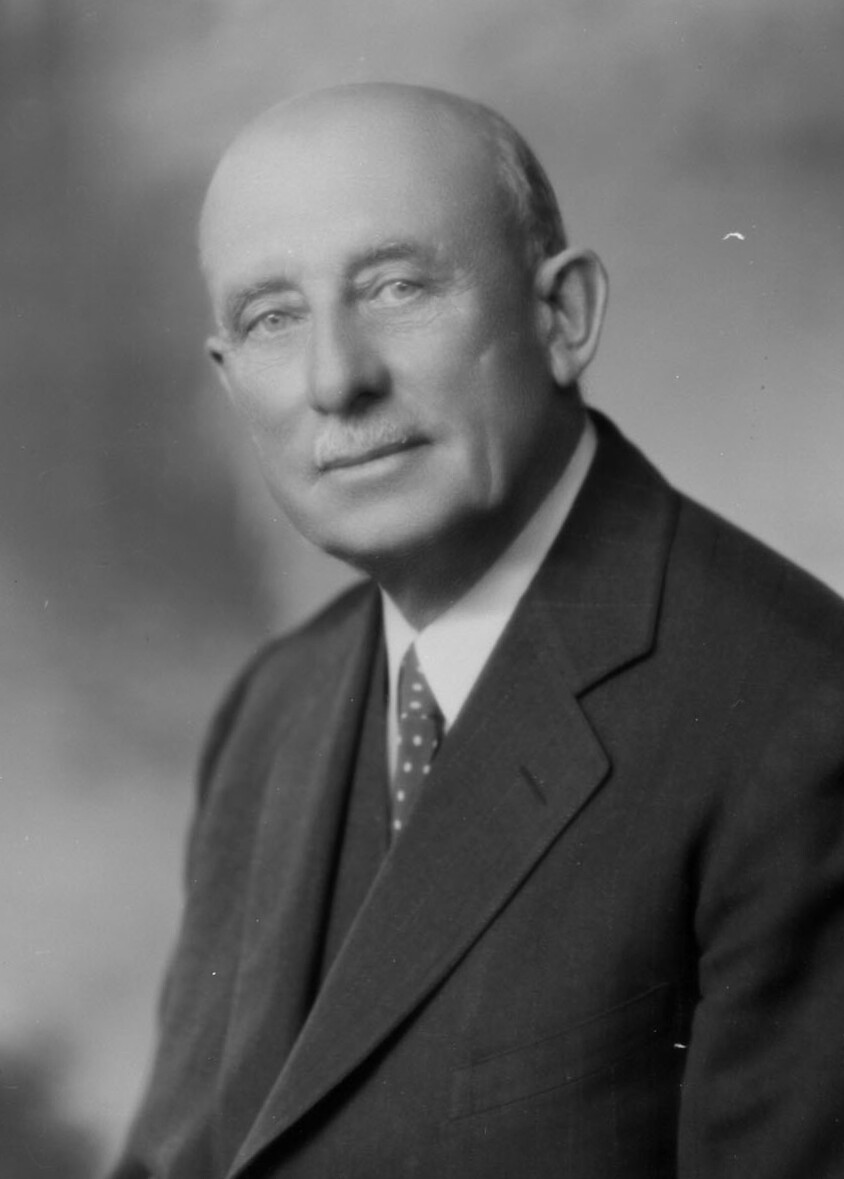

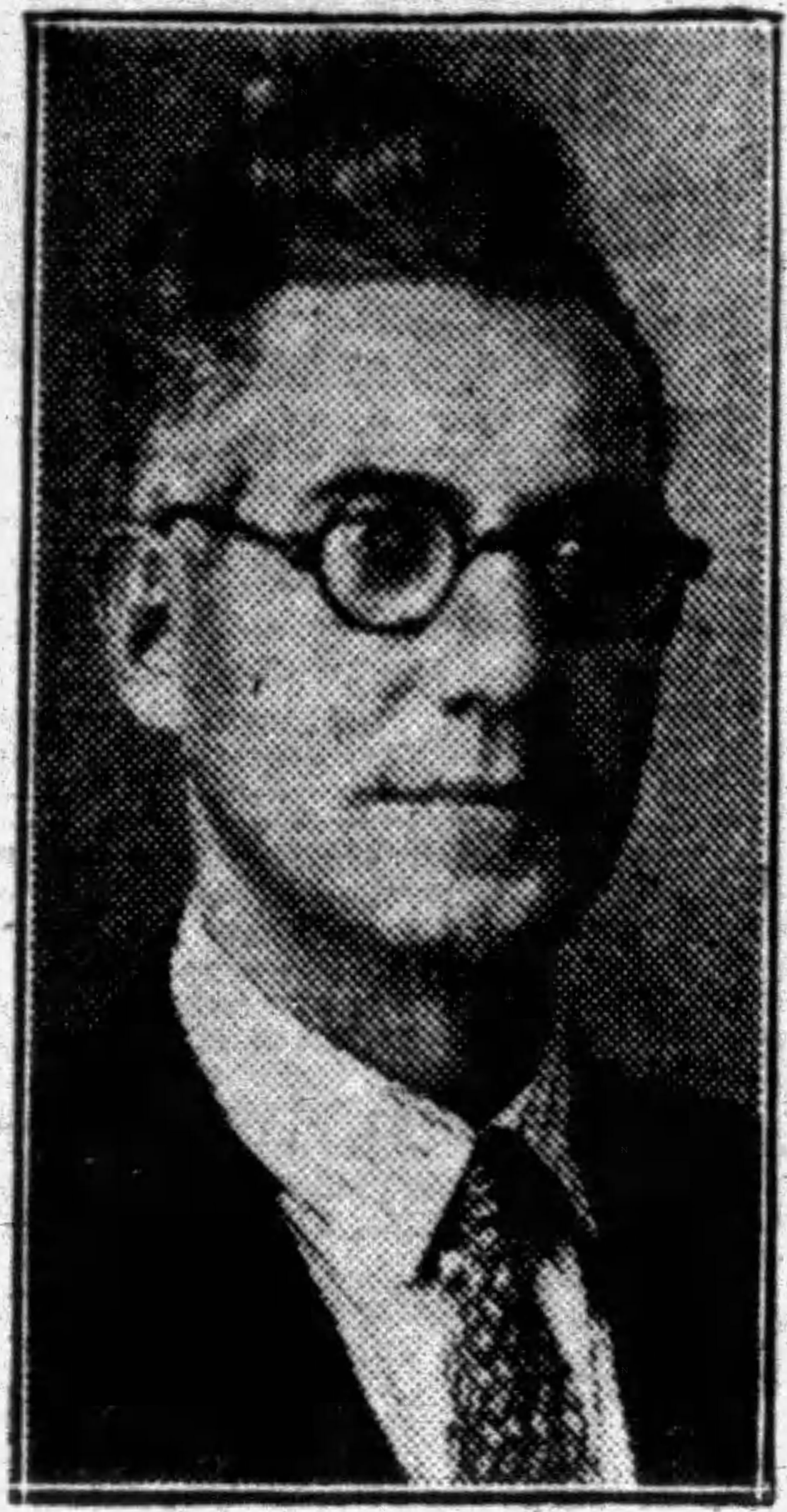
	First party	Second party	Third party
Leader	Mitchell Hepburn	George S. Henry	John Mitchell
Party	Liberal	Conservative	Co-operative Commonwealth
Leader since	December 17, 1930	1930	1934
Leader's seat	Elgin	York East	Ran in Wentworth (Lost)
Last election	11	90	(new)
Seats won	64	17	1
Seat change	▲53	▼73	▲1
Percentage	46.56%	39.78%	6.98%
Swing	▲15.06pp	▼16.88pp	▲6.98pp
Premier before election
George S. Henry
Conservative
Premier after election
Mitchell Hepburn
Liberal

The 1934 Ontario general election was the 19th general election held in the province of Ontario, Canada. It was held on June 19, 1934, to elect the 19th Legislative Assembly of Ontario ("MLAs").

The Ontario Liberal Party, led by Mitchell Hepburn, defeated the governing Ontario Conservative Party, led by George Stewart Henry. Hepburn was assisted by Harry Nixon's Progressive bloc of MLAs who ran in this election as Liberal-Progressives on the understanding that they would support a Hepburn led government. Nixon, himself, became a senior cabinet minister in the Hepburn government.

== Campaign ==
The campaign was brief and bitter, and both sides gained ammunition to use during that time. The Liberals were helped by the effects of the Great Depression, in much the same manner as their colleagues in the recent elections in Nova Scotia, British Columbia and Saskatchewan. (Note: as experienced in the recent 1933 Nova Scotia general election, 1933 British Columbia general election and 1934 Saskatchewan general election.) They also aggressively pledged to reduce the cost of government once in office, and downplayed the issue of temperance, by pledging to bring recently passed amendments to liquor legislation into force as soon as they attained office.

Under their new leader Mitchell Hepburn, the Liberals were considered to possess more energy in campaigning as a party than at any time since the collapse of the Ross government in 1905. In several meetings (starting in Milton in April 1934), Hepburn especially accused several Conservatives of operating a "tollgate system" in agencies selling British liquor to the Liquor Control Board of Ontario through which they earned kickbacks based on the volume sold.

The Liberals fielded candidates in 81 of the 90 ridings. None of the remaining nine were won by Conservatives: they were taken by 5 Liberal-Progressives, 1 UFO, 1 Liberal-Labour, 1 CCF and 1 Independent.

Riding contests, by number of candidates (1934)
Candidates	Lib	Con	CCF	L-P	UFO	Lib-Lab	Ind	Ind-Lib	Comm	Other	Total
2	34	39		3	1	1					78
3	28	31	22	2			6	1	1	2	93
4	13	13	10		1		4	1	6	4	52
5	3	4	2				2	1	3	5	20
6	3	3	3				2		3	4	18
Total	81	90	37	5	2	1	14	3	13	15	261

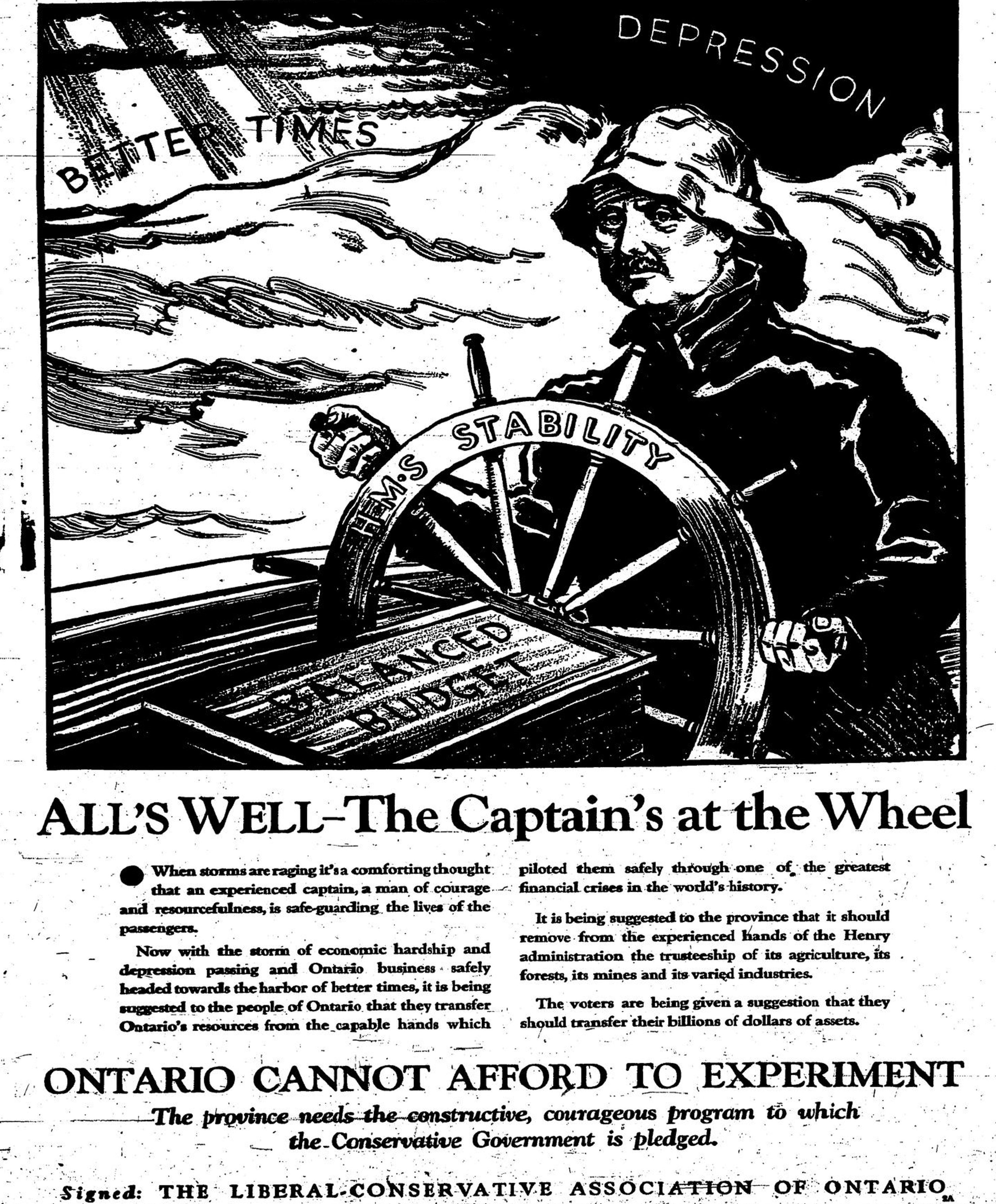
Election ad for the Ontario Conservatives run in the 1934 Ontario general election

=== Outcome ===
The Liberals won a majority in the Legislature, while the Conservatives lost four out of every five seats that they had won in the previous election. Eight Cabinet ministers were defeated, and no riding west of York County returned a Tory MPP. Northern Ontario went solidly Liberal.

The Co-operative Commonwealth Federation, in its first provincial election, ran 37 candidates and won a seat in the Ontario Legislature for the first time with the election of Samuel Lawrence in Hamilton East.

The United Farmers of Ontario had affiliated with the CCF but disaffiliated immediately prior to the 1934 election due to a row over suspected Communist infiltration of the party. Accordingly, two UFO nominated candidates, incumbent MLA Farquhar Oliver (Grey South) and Leslie Warner Oke, former MLA for Lambton East, ran as UFO candidates rather than with the CCF. Oliver was re-elected and later supported the Hepburn government.

=== Post-election developments ===
Three byelections had to be held shortly afterwards in August 1934:

- Earl Hutchinson (Kenora) was re-elected as a Liberal-Labour MLA but resigned a month later to allow Peter Heenan, a former Labour MLA in the riding, to contest Kenora in a by-election as a Liberal so that he could be appointed to Cabinet. Heenan was returned by acclamation. Hutchinson was then appointed vice-chairman of the Workmen's Compensation Board.
- David Taylor (Grey North) was appointed as Deputy Minister of Games and Fisheries. He was succeeded by Roland Patterson.
- Paul Munro (Wellington South) died in a car crash in July 1934. James King became the new MPP.

=== Redistribution and reduction of ridings ===
Toronto ridings as constituted in 1926

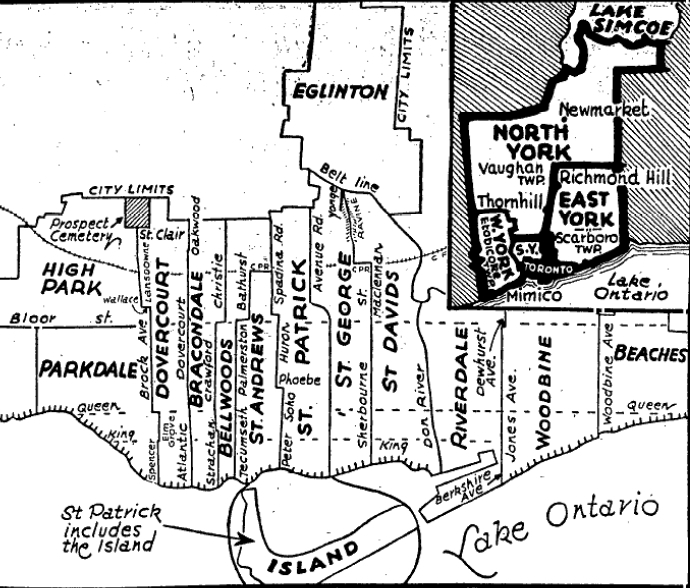
Toronto riding boundaries after 1934 redistribution

The Legislative Assembly was reduced from 112 seats to 90 as a result of an Act passed in 1933:

Abolished ridings	New ridings
Mergers of ridings
Algoma; Manitoulin	Algoma—Manitoulin
Brockville; Leeds	Leeds
Bruce North; Bruce South	Bruce
Dufferin; Simcoe Southwest	Dufferin—Simcoe
Elgin East; Elgin West	Elgin
Dundas; Grenville	Grenville—Dundas
Haldimand; Norfolk	Haldimand—Norfolk
Hamilton West; Wentworth South	Wentworth
Lanark North; Lanark South	Lanark
Lincoln; St. Catharines	Lincoln
London North; London South	London
Muskoka; Ontario North	Muskoka—Ontario
Nipissing; Sturgeon Falls	Nipissing
Ottawa North (Note: Part transferred to Carleton.); Ottawa South	Ottawa South
Oxford North; Oxford South	Oxford
Perth North; Perth South	Perth
Peterborough City; Peterborough County	Peterborough
Prince Edward; Frontenac-Lennox	Prince Edward—Lennox
Victoria North; Victoria South	Victoria
Riding abolished; parts transferred to other ridings
Brockton	Dovercourt; Parkdale
Greenwood	Riverdale; Woodbine
Hastings North	Hastings East; Hastings West
Change of name
Brant County	Brant
Huron North	Huron—Bruce (Note: Also absorbed part of Bruce South.)
Huron South	Huron
Middlesex West	Middlesex South (Note: Also absorbed part of Middlesex North.)
Ontario South	Ontario
Wellington Northeast	Wellington North
Wentworth North	Hamilton—Wentworth
Windsor East	Windsor—Walkerville
Windsor West	Windsor—Sandwich

A subsequent Act in 1934 modified the limits of several Toronto ridings.

== Results ==
Elections to the 19th Parliament of Ontario (1934)
Political party	Party leader	MPPs					Votes		
Political party	Party leader	Candidates	1929	Dissol.	1934	±	#	%	± (pp)
Liberal	Mitchell Hepburn	81	11	16	64	53▲	727,168	46.56%	15.06▲
Conservative	George Stewart Henry	90	90	88	17	73▼	621,218	39.78%	16.88▼
Co-operative Commonwealth	John Mitchell (Note: (party president))	37	–	–	1	1▲	108,961	6.98%	New
Liberal–Progressive (Note: Progressive and Liberal-Progressive 1929 results are combined.)	Harry Nixon	5	7	4	5	2▼	45,090	2.89%	1.92▼
Independent		14	–	–	1	1▲	19,103	1.22%	1.16▲
United Farmers	Farquhar Oliver	2	1	1	1	Steady	8,648	0.55%	0.71▼
Liberal–Labour		1	–	–	1	1▲	5,877	0.38%	New
Independent Conservative		3	2	2	–	2▼	423	0.03%	2.13▼
Labour		1	1	1	–	1▼	216	0.01%	0.84▼
Independent Liberal		3	–	–	–	–	12,284	0.79%	New
Communist		13	–	–	–	–	9,559	0.61%	0.46▲
Socialist Labor		5	–	–	–	–	1,626	0.10%	New
Farmer–Labour		1	–	–	–	–	608	0.04%	New
Independent Labour		1	–	–	–	–	534	0.03%	New
Independent Dry		1	–	–	–	–	165	0.01%	New
Workers		1	–	–	–	–	158	0.01%	New
Dry Liberal		1	–	–	–	–	107	0.01%	New
Socialist		1	–	–	–	–	81	0.01%	New
Total		261	112	112	90	-22	1,561,826	100.00%	
Blank and invalid ballots							17,267		
Registered voters / turnout							2,145,255	73.61%	16.99▲

=== Vote and seat summaries ===
Ternary plots - shift of electoral support (1929-1934)
1929

1934
Electoral districts identified by colours of winning parties

Seats and popular vote by party
Party	Seats	Votes	Change (pp)
█ Liberal	64 / 90	46.56%	15.06
█ Conservative	17 / 90	39.78%	-16.88
█ Liberal–Progressive	5 / 90	2.89%	-1.92
█ Co-operative Commonwealth	1 / 90	6.96%	6.96
█ United Farmers	1 / 90	0.56%	-0.71
█ Liberal–Labour	1 / 90	0.38%	0.38
█ Prohibitionist	0 / 90	0.00%	-2.54
█ Other	1 / 90	2.87%	0.25

=== Synopsis of results ===
Results by riding - 1934 Ontario general election
Riding	Winning party					Turnout (Note: including spoilt ballots)	Votes											
Name (Note: order is as given in EO reports)	Party	Votes	Share	Margin #	Margin %	Turnout	Lib	Con	CCF	L-Prog	UFO	LL	Ind	Comm	Ind-Lib	Ind-Oth	Other	Total
Addington	Con	7,223	53.81%	1,024	7.63%	79.40%	6,199	7,223	–	–	–	–	–	–	–	–	–	13,422
Algoma—Manitoulin	Lib	9,247	62.87%	3,786	25.74%	79.07%	9,247	5,461	–	–	–	–	–	–	–	–	–	14,708
Brant	L-P	9,402	68.65%	5,108	37.30%	70.69%	–	4,294	–	9,402	–	–	–	–	–	–	–	13,696
Brantford	Ind	8,349	50.17%	2,014	12.10%	81.55%	–	6,335	1,958	–	–	–	8,349	–	–	–	–	16,642
Bruce	Lib	10,100	60.07%	3,387	20.15%	77.98%	10,100	6,713	–	–	–	–	–	–	–	–	–	16,813
Carleton	Con	6,842	56.36%	1,545	12.73%	72.73%	5,297	6,842	–	–	–	–	–	–	–	–	–	12,139
Cochrane North	Lib	5,304	53.41%	1,981	19.95%	79.83%	5,304	3,323	770	–	–	–	–	–	–	534	–	9,931
Cochrane South	Lib	8,183	47.02%	3,061	17.59%	71.56%	8,183	5,122	2,975	–	–	–	210	759	–	156	–	17,405
Dufferin—Simcoe	Lib	8,393	53.60%	1,126	7.19%	76.21%	8,393	7,267	–	–	–	–	–	–	–	–	–	15,660
Durham	Lib	6,232	45.75%	268	1.97%	74.32%	6,232	5,964	1,425	–	–	–	–	–	–	–	–	13,621
Elgin	Lib	11,922	56.58%	2,772	13.15%	82.13%	11,922	9,150	–	–	–	–	–	–	–	–	–	21,072
Essex North	Lib	7,459	50.71%	3,030	20.60%	77.04%	7,459	4,429	1,812	–	–	–	–	1,009	–	–	–	14,709
Essex South	Lib	7,110	55.56%	1,423	11.12%	66.68%	7,110	5,687	–	–	–	–	–	–	–	–	–	12,797
Fort William	Lib	9,100	62.87%	3,725	25.73%	82.43%	9,100	5,375	–	–	–	–	–	–	–	–	–	14,475
Glengarry	Lib	6,391	61.55%	2,398	23.09%	68.33%	6,391	3,993	–	–	–	–	–	–	–	–	–	10,384
Grenville—Dundas	Con	8,859	53.97%	1,302	7.93%	73.56%	7,557	8,859	–	–	–	–	–	–	–	–	–	16,416
Grey North	L-P	9,770	60.52%	3,396	21.04%	79.81%	–	6,374	–	9,770	–	–	–	–	–	–	–	16,144
Grey South	UFO	8,301	59.66%	2,689	19.33%	73.46%	–	5,612	–	–	8,301	–	–	–	–	–	–	13,913
Haldimand—Norfolk	Lib	12,164	56.43%	2,771	12.85%	74.32%	12,164	9,393	–	–	–	–	–	–	–	–	–	21,557
Halton	L-P	6,929	50.00%	1,301	9.39%	74.60%	–	5,628	1,301	6,929	–	–	–	–	–	–	–	13,858
Hamilton East	CCF	10,458	54.86%	3,245	17.02%	67.64%	–	7,213	10,458	–	–	–	416	815	–	–	162	19,064
Hamilton Centre	Lib	11,250	51.71%	3,222	14.81%	70.34%	11,250	8,028	2,478	–	–	–	–	–	–	–	–	21,756
Hamilton—Wentworth	Lib	11,127	57.18%	4,284	22.01%	77.45%	11,127	6,843	1,491	–	–	–	–	–	–	–	–	19,461
Hastings East	Con	6,257	51.73%	418	3.46%	78.35%	5,839	6,257	–	–	–	–	–	–	–	–	–	12,096
Hastings West	Lib	9,627	53.26%	1,179	6.52%	80.01%	9,627	8,448	–	–	–	–	–	–	–	–	–	18,075
Huron	Lib	8,254	57.52%	2,281	15.90%	78.86%	8,254	5,973	–	–	–	–	122	–	–	–	–	14,349
Huron—Bruce	Lib	9,591	65.78%	4,602	31.56%	73.25%	9,591	4,989	–	–	–	–	–	–	–	–	–	14,580
Kenora	L-L	5,877	62.41%	2,337	24.82%	71.92%	–	3,540	–	–	–	5,877	–	–	–	–	–	9,417
Kent East	L-P	8,399	64.60%	4,064	31.26%	72.89%	–	4,335	–	8,399 (Note: byelection gain was under the Liberal banner)	–	–	267	–	–	–	–	13,001
Kent West	Lib	11,016	58.81%	4,879	26.04%	74.30%	11,016	6,137	–	–	–	–	1,580	–	–	–	–	18,733
Kingston	Con	7,634	53.92%	1,109	7.83%	79.02%	6,525	7,634	–	–	–	–	–	–	–	–	–	14,159
Lambton East	Lib	7,835	56.80%	2,406	17.44%	74.64%	7,835	5,429	–	–	347	–	183	–	–	–	–	13,794
Lambton West	Lib	7,473	54.75%	2,307	16.90%	76.57%	7,473	5,166	–	–	–	–	1,010	–	–	–	–	13,649
Lanark	Con	8,468	52.27%	737	4.55%	73.20%	7,731	8,468	–	–	–	–	–	–	–	–	–	16,199
Leeds	Lib	10,195	53.24%	1,242	6.49%	77.95%	10,195	8,953	–	–	–	–	–	–	–	–	–	19,148
Lincoln	Lib	12,924	48.85%	1,436	5.43%	76.94%	12,924	11,488	2,047	–	–	–	–	–	–	–	–	26,459
London	Lib	16,442	54.69%	3,119	10.37%	74.95%	16,442	13,323	–	–	–	–	–	–	–	–	300	30,065
Middlesex North	Lib	7,753	54.75%	1,345	9.50%	72.72%	7,753	6,408	–	–	–	–	–	–	–	–	–	14,161
Middlesex South	Lib	8,239	60.33%	2,821	20.66%	73.33%	8,239	5,418	–	–	–	–	–	–	–	–	–	13,657
Muskoka—Ontario	L-P	10,590	56.86%	2,554	13.71%	79.04%	–	8,036	–	10,590	–	–	–	–	–	–	–	18,626
Niagara Falls	Lib	9,096	53.12%	3,982	23.25%	73.04%	9,096	5,114	2,914	–	–	–	–	–	–	–	–	17,124
Nipissing	Lib	12,149	66.80%	6,111	33.60%	74.90%	12,149	6,038	–	–	–	–	–	–	–	–	–	18,187
Northumberland	Lib	9,087	52.53%	876	5.06%	83.20%	9,087	8,211	–	–	–	–	–	–	–	–	–	17,298
Ontario	Lib	11,409	56.63%	5,046	25.05%	76.42%	11,409	6,363	2,375	–	–	–	–	–	–	–	–	20,147
Ottawa East	Lib	10,314	43.37%	3,039	12.78%	81.10%	10,314	7,275	–	–	–	–	–	–	6,116	79	–	23,784
Ottawa South	Con	16,983	47.56%	246	0.69%	74.20%	16,737	16,983	1,531	–	–	–	–	192	–	165	100	35,708
Oxford	Lib	11,767	50.11%	2,472	10.53%	79.50%	11,767	9,295	2,422	–	–	–	–	–	–	–	–	23,484
Parry Sound	Lib	7,199	62.83%	2,940	25.66%	78.82%	7,199	4,259	–	–	–	–	–	–	–	–	–	11,458
Peel	Lib	7,960	48.42%	244	1.48%	78.04%	7,960	7,716	764	–	–	–	–	–	–	–	–	16,440
Perth	Lib	16,371	60.23%	5,560	20.45%	78.88%	16,371	10,811	–	–	–	–	–	–	–	–	–	27,182
Peterborough	Con	9,394	44.64%	34	0.16%	76.36%	9,360	9,394	2,288	–	–	–	–	–	–	–	–	21,042
Port Arthur	Lib	7,514	58.93%	3,228	25.32%	81.10%	7,514	4,286	342	–	–	–	–	–	–	–	608	12,750
Prescott	Lib	5,004	38.79%	228	1.77%	76.80%	5,004	3,119	–	–	–	–	–	–	4,776	–	–	12,899
Prince Edward—Lennox	Lib	7,866	52.15%	650	4.31%	74.95%	7,866	7,216	–	–	–	–	–	–	–	–	–	15,082
Rainy River	Lib	4,725	68.26%	2,528	36.52%	76.13%	4,725	2,197	–	–	–	–	–	–	–	–	–	6,922
Renfrew North	Lib	7,770	60.86%	2,772	21.71%	76.80%	7,770	4,998	–	–	–	–	–	–	–	–	–	12,768
Renfrew South	Lib	8,406	65.18%	3,915	30.36%	76.00%	8,406	4,491	–	–	–	–	–	–	–	–	–	12,897
Russell	Lib	6,381	54.55%	2,971	25.40%	72.36%	6,381	3,410	–	–	–	–	1,906	–	–	–	–	11,697
Sault Ste. Marie	Lib	7,530	55.47%	1,811	13.34%	77.94%	7,530	5,719	327	–	–	–	–	–	–	–	–	13,576
Simcoe Centre	Lib	9,004	62.59%	3,622	25.18%	74.46%	9,004	5,382	–	–	–	–	–	–	–	–	–	14,386
Simcoe East	Lib	9,327	57.15%	2,334	14.30%	80.64%	9,327	6,993	–	–	–	–	–	–	–	–	–	16,320
Stormont	Lib	9,430	63.06%	3,905	26.11%	72.25%	9,430	5,525	–	–	–	–	–	–	–	–	–	14,955
Sudbury	Lib	10,516	52.88%	1,604	8.07%	76.86%	10,516	8,912	–	–	–	–	–	458	–	–	–	19,886
Temiskaming	Lib	5,573	48.48%	2,300	20.01%	73.92%	5,573	3,273	2,649	–	–	–	–	–	–	–	–	11,495
Victoria	Lib	10,629	57.11%	2,647	14.22%	81.29%	10,629	7,982	–	–	–	–	–	–	–	–	–	18,611
Waterloo North	Lib	11,827	53.11%	6,241	28.03%	68.87%	11,827	5,586	4,327	–	–	–	–	528	–	–	–	22,268
Waterloo South	Lib	8,860	50.43%	2,337	13.30%	75.91%	8,860	6,523	2,186	–	–	–	–	–	–	–	–	17,569
Welland	Lib	10,386	55.74%	4,164	22.35%	73.36%	10,386	6,222	2,024	–	–	–	–	–	–	–	–	18,632
Wellington North	Lib	10,209	66.29%	5,017	32.58%	74.10%	10,209	5,192	–	–	–	–	–	–	–	–	–	15,401
Wellington South	Lib	10,376	60.36%	3,561	20.71%	84.97%	10,376	6,815	–	–	–	–	–	–	–	–	–	17,191
Wentworth	Lib	6,272	34.47%	119	0.65%	71.89%	6,272	6,153	5,771	–	–	–	–	–	–	–	–	18,196
Windsor—Walkerville	Lib	10,104	57.58%	5,324	30.34%	76.74%	10,104	4,780	2,151	–	–	–	–	512	–	–	–	17,547
Windsor—Sandwich	Lib	9,934	56.51%	3,953	22.49%	69.85%	9,934	5,981	1,664	–	–	–	–	–	–	–	–	17,579
York East	Con	12,815	42.60%	2,741	9.11%	69.78%	10,074	12,815	6,223	–	–	–	225	664	–	–	81	30,082
York North	Lib	11,402	56.20%	3,489	17.20%	77.52%	11,402	7,913	974	–	–	–	–	–	–	–	–	20,289
York South	Con	10,159	39.70%	980	3.83%	69.06%	9,179	10,159	5,546	–	–	–	–	706	–	–	–	25,590
York West	Lib	11,600	45.60%	2,119	8.33%	63.36%	11,600	9,481	3,875	–	–	–	–	483	–	–	–	25,439
Beaches	Con	7,822	44.38%	2,876	16.32%	67.62%	4,859	7,822	4,946	–	–	–	–	–	–	–	–	17,627
Bellwoods	Lib	9,339	55.17%	3,973	23.47%	70.70%	9,339	5,366	–	–	–	–	1,133	1,091	–	–	–	16,929
Bracondale	Con	6,452	41.10%	289	1.84%	64.84%	6,163	6,452	2,734	–	–	–	–	312	–	–	39	15,700
Dovercourt	Con	9,266	41.13%	410	1.82%	66.94%	8,856	9,266	4,192	–	–	–	–	–	–	–	216	22,530
Eglinton	Lib	12,556	46.51%	1,665	6.17%	68.03%	12,556	10,891	–	–	–	–	3,287	–	–	–	265	26,999
High Park	Con	8,934	42.14%	993	4.68%	68.08%	7,941	8,934	4,327	–	–	–	–	–	–	–	–	21,202
Parkdale	Con	10,087	42.26%	212	0.89%	67.01%	9,875	10,087	3,906	–	–	–	–	–	–	–	–	23,868
Riverdale	Lib	10,898	48.90%	535	2.40%	63.70%	10,898	10,363	–	–	–	–	–	–	–	–	1,025	22,286
St. Andrew	Lib	6,055	42.20%	1,371	9.55%	66.57%	6,055	4,684	–	–	–	–	–	2,030	1,392	188	–	14,349
St. David	Con	6,751	40.51%	1,095	6.57%	64.63%	5,656	6,751	4,260	–	–	–	–	–	–	–	–	16,667
St. George	Lib	8,296	45.49%	426	2.34%	62.16%	8,296	7,870	1,862	–	–	–	210	–	–	–	–	18,238
St. Patrick	Lib	5,704	50.08%	18	0.16%	63.00%	5,704	5,686	–	–	–	–	–	–	–	–	–	11,390
Woodbine	Con	9,334	41.76%	2,190	9.80%	65.43%	7,144	9,334	5,666	–	–	–	205	–	–	–	–	22,349

= open seat
= turnout is above provincial average
= winning candidate was in previous Legislature
= incumbent switched allegiance for the election
= incumbency arose from byelection gain
= other incumbents renominated
= not incumbent; was previously elected to the Legislature
= previously an MP in the House of Commons of Canada
= multiple candidates

Party candidates in 2nd place
Party in 1st place	Party in 2nd place				Total
Party in 1st place	Lib	Con	CCF	I-Lib	Total
Liberal		63		1	64
Conservative	16		1		17
Liberal–Progressive		5			5
United Farmers		1			1
Liberal–Labour		1			1
Co-operative Commonwealth		1			1
Independent		1			1
Total	16	72	1	1	90

Candidates ranked 1st to 5th place, by party
Parties	1st	2nd	3rd	4th	5th	Total
█ Liberal	64	16	1			90
█ Conservative	17	72	1			90
█ Liberal–Progressive	5					5
█ Co-operative Commonwealth	1	1	34	1		37
█ Independent	1		7	4	2	14
█ United Farmers	1		1			2
█ Liberal–Labour	1					1
█ Independent Liberal		1	1	1		3
█ Communist			3	10		13
█ Socialist Labor			2		2	4
█ Farmer–Labour			1			1
█ Independent Conservative				1	1	2
█ Independent Labour				1		1
█ Labour				1		1
█ Workers				1		1
█ Dry Liberal					1	1
█ Independent Dry					1	1

=== Reorganization of ridings ===
1929		1934	
Riding	Party	Riding	Party
Mergers of ridings
Algoma	█ Conservative	Algoma—Manitoulin	█ Liberal
Manitoulin	█ Conservative	Algoma—Manitoulin	█ Liberal
Brockville	█ Conservative	Leeds	█ Liberal
Leeds	█ Conservative	Leeds	█ Liberal
Bruce North	█ Liberal	Bruce	█ Liberal
Bruce South	█ Liberal	Bruce	█ Liberal
Dufferin	█ Progressive	Dufferin—Simcoe	█ Liberal
Simcoe Southwest	█ Conservative	Dufferin—Simcoe	█ Liberal
Elgin East	█ Conservative	Elgin	█ Liberal
Elgin West	█ Conservative	Elgin	█ Liberal
Dundas	█ Conservative	Grenville—Dundas	█ Conservative
Grenville	█ Conservative	Grenville—Dundas	█ Conservative
Haldimand	█ Conservative	Haldimand—Norfolk	█ Liberal
Norfolk	█ Conservative	Haldimand—Norfolk	█ Liberal
Hamilton West	█ Conservative	Wentworth	█ Liberal
Wentworth South	█ Conservative	Wentworth	█ Liberal
Lanark North	█ Conservative	Lanark	█ Conservative
Lanark South	█ Conservative	Lanark	█ Conservative
Lincoln	█ Conservative	Lincoln	█ Liberal
St. Catharines	█ Conservative	Lincoln	█ Liberal
London North	█ Conservative	London	█ Liberal
London South	█ Conservative	London	█ Liberal
Muskoka	█ Conservative	Muskoka—Ontario	█ Liberal–Progressive
Ontario North	█ Conservative	Muskoka—Ontario	█ Liberal–Progressive
Nipissing	█ Conservative	Nipissing	█ Liberal
Sturgeon Falls	█ Conservative	Nipissing	█ Liberal
Ottawa North	█ Conservative	Ottawa South	█ Conservative
Ottawa South	█ Conservative	Ottawa South	█ Conservative
Oxford North	█ Liberal–Progressive	Oxford	█ Liberal
Oxford South	█ Liberal	Oxford	█ Liberal
Perth North	█ Conservative	Perth	█ Liberal
Perth South	█ Conservative	Perth	█ Liberal
Peterborough City	█ Conservative	Peterborough	█ Conservative
Peterborough County	█ Conservative	Peterborough	█ Conservative
Prince Edward	█ Conservative	Prince Edward—Lennox	█ Liberal
Frontenac-Lennox	█ Conservative	Prince Edward—Lennox	█ Liberal
Victoria North	█ Liberal–Progressive	Victoria	█ Liberal
Victoria South	█ Conservative	Victoria	█ Liberal
Riding abolished; parts transferred to other ridings
Brockton	█ Conservative		
Greenwood	█ Conservative		
Hastings North	█ Conservative		

=== Seats that changed hands ===
Elections to the 18th Parliament of Ontario – unaltered seats won/lost by party, 1929–1934
Party	1929	Gain from (loss to)																		1934
Party	1929	Con		Lib		Pro		L-Pro		UFO		Lab		I-Con		CCF		Ind		1934
Conservative	55				(39)				(1)								(1)		(1)	13
Liberal	8	39				1								2						50
Progressive	3				(1)				(2)											–
Liberal–Progressive	1	1				2														4
United Farmers	1																			1
Labour (Note: Incumbent changed affiliation to Liberal-Labour for the 1934 election)	1																			1
Independent-Conservative	2				(2)															–
Co-operative Commonwealth	–	1																		1
Independent	–	1																		1
Total	71	42	–	–	(42)	3	–	–	(3)	–	–	–	–	2	–	–	(1)	–	(1)	71

Of the unaltered seats, there were 47 that changed allegiance in the election:

Conservative to Liberal

- Bellwoods
- Cochrane North
- Cochrane South
- Eglinton
- Essex North
- Essex South
- Fort William
- Hamilton Centre
- Hamilton—Wentworth
- Hastings West
- Kent West
- Lambton East
- Lambton West
- Middlesex North
- Middlesex South
- Niagara Falls
- Northumberland
- Ottawa East
- Parry Sound
- Peel
- Port Arthur
- Renfrew North
- Riverdale
- Russell
- Sault Ste. Marie
- Simcoe East
- St. Andrew
- St. George
- St. Patrick
- Stormont
- Sudbury
- Timiskaming
- Waterloo South
- Welland
- Wellington South
- Windsor—Sandwich
- Windsor—Walkerville
- York North
- York West

Conservative to Liberal-Progressive

- Kent East

Conservative to CCF

- Hamilton East

Conservative to Independent

- Brantford

Progressive to Liberal

- Huron (formerly Huron South)

Progressive to Liberal-Progressive

- Brant
- Grey North

Independent-Conservative to Liberal

- Prescott
- Rainy River

== See also ==
- Politics of Ontario
- List of Ontario political parties
- Premier of Ontario
- Leader of the Opposition (Ontario)
