= Windsor—Sandwich =

Former provincial electoral district in Ontario, Canada

Ontario electoral district

Defunct provincial electoral district
- Legislature: Legislative Assembly of Ontario
- District created: 1934
- District abolished: 1999
- First contested: 1934
- Last contested: 1995

Windsor—Sandwich was a provincial electoral district in Ontario, Canada. It was created in 1934 and was abolished following the 1967 election due to redistribution. The area was restructured as Windsor West from 1967 to 1975, during which time it was represented by New Democrats Hugh Peacock, and Ted Bounsall.

Windsor—Sandwich was re-established for the 1975 election, but was eliminated again through redistribution in 1996. The district formally ceased to exist with the 1999 provincial election, and was incorporated into the new districts of Windsor West and Essex.

== Members of Provincial Parliament ==
Windsor-Sandwich
Assembly	Years	Member	Party
Created from part of Windsor West in 1934
19th	1934–1937	James Clark	Liberal
20th	1937–1943	James Clark	Liberal
21st	1943–1945	George Bennett	Co-operative Commonwealth
22nd	1945–1948	William Griesinger	Progressive Conservative
23rd	1948–1951	William Griesinger	Progressive Conservative
24th	1951–1955	William Griesinger	Progressive Conservative
25th	1955–1959	William Griesinger	Progressive Conservative
26th	1959–1963	Maurice Bélanger	Liberal
27th	1963–1967	Ivan Thrasher	Progressive Conservative
Windsor West 1967-1975
30th	1975–1977	Ted Bounsall	New Democratic
31st	1977–1981	Ted Bounsall	New Democratic
32nd	1981–1985	Bill Wrye	Liberal
33rd	1985–1987	Bill Wrye	Liberal
34th	1987–1990	Bill Wrye	Liberal
35th	1990–1995	George Dadamo	New Democratic
36th	1995–1999	Sandra Pupatello	Liberal
Sourced from the Ontario Legislative Assembly
Merged into Windsor West and Essex before the 1999 election

== See also ==
- List of Ontario provincial electoral districts
- Canadian provincial electoral districts
