= Ivan Thrasher =

Canadian politician

Ontario MPP
- In office 1964–1967
- Preceded by: Maurice Bélanger
- Succeeded by: Riding abolished
- Constituency: Windsor—Sandwich

Personal details
- Born: May 21, 1914 Amherstburg, Ontario
- Died: January 11, 2011 (aged 96) Guelph, Ontario
- Party: Progressive Conservative
- Spouse: Orpha Miller
- Children: 5
- Occupation: Farmer, real estate agent

Military service
- Allegiance: Canadian
- Branch/service: Canadian Armed Forces
- Years of service: 1940–1945
- Battles/wars: Italian Campaign, Liberation of Holland

Ivan William Thrasher (May 21, 1914 – January 21, 2011) was a politician in Ontario, Canada. He served as a Progressive Conservative member of the Legislative Assembly of Ontario from 1964 to 1967. He represented the riding of Windsor—Sandwich in the government of John Robarts.

== Background ==
Thrasher was born Amherstburg, Ontario near Windsor, Ontario. He was one of eight children in the family of William and Ruby Thrasher. In 1940, he joined the Canadian Armed Forces and served in the 1st and 2nd Regiments, participating in both the Italian campaign and the liberation of Holland. After returning to Canada, he began a turkey farm, then a successful real estate business.

He married Orpha Miller in 1946 and together they raised five children in Cottam, Ontario and Ruthven, Ontario.

== Politics ==
Thrasher ran for office in the 1963 provincial election as the Progressive Conservative candidate in the riding of Windsor—Sandwich. He was defeated by Liberal incumbent Maurice Bélanger by 999 votes. When Bélanger died in 1964, Thrasher ran to replace him in a by-election. He defeated Liberal candidate Archibald Gignac by 829 votes. Thrasher served as a backbench supporter in the majority PC government led by Premier John Robarts. In the 1967 election, Thrasher ran in the redistributed riding of Windsor West. He came in third, trailing the winner, NDP candidate Hugh Peacock, by 1,884 votes.

== Later life ==
After leaving politics, he returned to his farm where he bred and raced thoroughbred horses. His farm was called 'Lucky T. Stud'. He died in 2011 at the age of 96.
