= Windsor West =

Windsor West could refer to:

- Windsor West (federal electoral district)
- Windsor West (provincial electoral district)
