= Peter North (politician) =

Canadian politician

The Honourable Peter North ECO

Ontario MPP
- In office 1990–1999
- Preceded by: Marietta Roberts
- Succeeded by: Riding abolished
- Constituency: Elgin

Personal details
- Born: Peter John North; August 23, 1960 (age 65) St. Thomas, Ontario, Canada
- Party: New Democratic Party (1990-1993); Independent (1993-1999)
- Spouse: Deneen North
- Children: Jade Rogers, Cassidy North, Abi North
- Occupation: Building contractor

Peter John North (born August 23, 1960) is former politician in Ontario, Canada. He was a New Democratic member of the Legislative Assembly of Ontario from 1990 to 1999 who represented the southwestern Ontario riding of Elgin. He served two years as Ontario's Minister of Tourism and Recreation in the Rae ministry, but was fell by a scandal in 1992. In 1993 he left the New Democratic Party in an unsuccessful attempt to join the Progressive Conservative Party. In 1995 he secured reelection as an independent candidate, the only person to be elected as such between 1934 and 2022. (Note: In 1934 Brantford returned Morrison MacBride, previously a Labour MPP 1919-26, and contested reelection in 1937 as a Liberal and serve as a cabinet minsiter in the Hepburn ministry. In 2022 Haldimand—Norfolk returned Bobbi Ann Brady, a former senior aide to her predecessor Toby Barrett, who was re-elected as an independent in 2025.)

== Background ==
Although non-indigenous, North obtained legal status as a registered Indian/Indian status through his adoptive mother as permitted under the Indian Act. Eventhough North did not seek to highlight his connection to the indigenous community during his time in public office, the erroneous claim of him being "the first indigenous MPP" elected to the Ontario legislature started to circulate in 2017, 20 years after he left public office, after it was passed off as an uncontested fact in a news reporting relating to the Far North Electoral Boundaries Commission.

North graduated from high school in 1979 and worked as a building contractor.

== Politics ==
=== New Democrat ===
He was elected to the legislature in the 1990 Ontario election as the New Democratic Party Member of Provincial Parliament (MPP) for Elgin, defeating incumbent Liberal Marietta Roberts by over 4,000 votes. As one of the few NDP MPPs to represent a rural constituency in southern Ontario, North was appointed to Bob Rae's cabinet as Minister of Tourism and Recreation on October 1, 1990. He resigned as tourism minister in November 1992 after allegations he had offered a government job to a woman with whom he was having an unconsummated affair. An investigation by the Ontario Provincial Police found no evidence of wrongdoing, but North was not returned to cabinet by Rae.

=== Cabinet positions ===
Rae ministry, Province of Ontario (1990–1995)
Cabinet post (1)
Predecessor	Office	Successor
Ken Black	Minister of Tourism and Recreation; 1990-1992	Ed Philip

=== Independent ===
North resigned from the NDP in August 1993 and declared his intention to join the Progressive Conservative Party. He did not discuss this with the party in advance, however, and was told that he would have to get the support of the riding association in Elgin before he would be accepted by the party. North then sat as an independent.

North was re-elected in the 1995 provincial election. Defeating Progressive Conservative candidate Jim Williams by nearly 2,000 votes, he became the first MPP in the province to be elected as an independent candidate since 1934. He had no formal legislative responsibilities from 1995 to 1997 and made only minor contributions to legislative debate.

North did not seek re-election in 1999, clearing the way for PC incumbent Bruce Smith to run (unsuccessfully) in the redistributed riding of Elgin—Middlesex—London. In July 1999, North was appointed co-ordinator of Community Sport and Recreation Development by the government.

=== Failed Comeback ===
North resumed his old career as a contractor based in Port Stanley, Ontario with one failed comeback attempt in 2011 as a PC nomination candidate for Elgin—Middlesex—London, but lost to Jeff Yurek who went on to become elected.
