= William Griesinger =

Canadian politician (1895–1978)

Ontario MPP
- In office 1945–1959
- Preceded by: George Bennett
- Succeeded by: Maurice Bélanger
- Constituency: Windsor—Sandwich

Personal details
- Born: June 20, 1895 Windsor, Ontario
- Died: April 19, 1978 (aged 82) Windsor, Ontario
- Party: Progressive Conservative
- Spouse: Mary Adele Allen
- Children: 2
- Occupation: Businessman

Military service
- Allegiance: Canadian
- Branch/service: Canadian Expeditionary Force
- Years of service: 1914-1971
- Rank: Major, Lt. Colonel
- Unit: 19th Battalion (Major)
- Commands: The Essex and Kent Scottish (Lt. Colonel)
- Battles/wars: Vimy Ridge
- Awards: Military Cross

William Griesinger MC (June 20, 1895 – April 19, 1978) was a politician in Ontario, Canada. He was a Progressive Conservative member of the Legislative Assembly of Ontario from 1945 to 1959 who represented the southwestern riding of Windsor—Sandwich. He was a cabinet minister in the governments of George Drew, Thomas Kennedy and Leslie Frost.

== Background ==
He was born in Windsor, Ontario, the son of Lewis Griesinger. In 1934, he married Mary Adele Allen, with whom he raised daughter Rosemary and adopted son William. He was owner and general manager of the Windsor Lumber Company. Griesinger served with the Canadian Expeditionary Force during World War I, reaching the rank of major, and was awarded the Military Cross at the Battle of Vimy Ridge. After the war, he continued to serve with the local militia and was made commander The Essex and Kent Scottish with the lieutenant-colonel. During World War II he was an area commandant and after the war continued to serve as honorary commander until 1971.

== Politics ==
Griesinger was elected in the 1945 provincial election, in the riding of Windsor—Sandwich. He defeated CCF incumbent George Bennett by 3,042 votes. He was re-elected three times until he was defeated by Liberal Maurice Bélanger in 1959. He served in the provincial cabinets of George Drew, Thomas Kennedy as a Minister Without Portfolio. He served as Chief Commissioner of the Liquor Control Board of Ontario from 1948 to 1949. In 1949, Leslie Frost appointed him as Minister of Planning and Development. In 1953 he was appointed as Minister of Public Works. As minister of Public Works he directed the commencement of construction of Highway 401 at the western end.

He resigned from the provincial cabinet in 1958 after he was implicated in a stock trading scandal involving Northern Ontario Natural Gas, a natural gas company. Specifically, Premier Leslie Frost had ordered all members of his Cabinet to divest themselves of shares in the company but Griesinger did not do so. Later, Premier Frost described Griesinger's involvement in the matter as a "minor indiscretion".

=== Cabinet posts ===
Frost ministry, Province of Ontario (1949–1961)
Cabinet posts (2)
Predecessor	Office	Successor
Fletcher Stewart Thomas	Minister of Public Works; 1953-1958	James Allan
George Arthur Welsh	Minister of Planning and Development; 1949-1953	Bill Warrender

Kennedy ministry, Province of Ontario (1948–1949)
Sub-Cabinet Post
Predecessor	Title	Successor
	Minister without portfolio (1948-1949)	
