= George Milward Boyd =

Canadian politician

Ontario MPP
- In office 1898–1902
- Preceded by: James Cleland
- Succeeded by: Alexander Grant MacKay
- Constituency: Grey North

Personal details
- Born: October 12, 1851; St. Vincent Township, Grey County, Canada West
- Died: March 23, 1940 (aged 88); Owen Sound, Ontario
- Political party: Conservative
- Spouse: Katherine Vance (m.1874)

George Milward Boyd (October 12, 1851 – March 23, 1940) was an Ontario businessman and political figure. He represented Grey North in the Legislative Assembly of Ontario from 1898 to 1902 as a Conservative member.

He was born in St. Vincent Township, Grey County, Canada West, the son of Samuel C. Boyd. He imported and exported livestock. In 1874, Boyd married Katherine Vance.

He died on March 23, 1940, in Owen Sound and was buried at Greenwood Cemetery at that same city.
