= James Cleland (politician) =

Canadian politician

Ontario MPP
- In office 1890–1898
- Preceded by: David Creighton
- Succeeded by: George Milward Boyd
- Constituency: Grey North

Personal details
- Born: June 10, 1839 Glasgow, Scotland
- Died: March 11, 1908 (aged 68) Meaford, Ontario
- Party: Liberal
- Spouse: Sarah Butchart (m.1862)
- Occupation: Merchant

James Cleland (June 10, 1839 – March 11, 1908) was a Scottish-born merchant and political figure in Ontario, Canada. He represented Grey North in the Legislative Assembly of Ontario from 1890 to 1898 as a Liberal member.

He was born in Glasgow in 1839, apprenticed as a tinsmith there and came to Canada West in 1857, where he entered the business of selling hardware. In 1862, Cleland married Sarah Butchart. He served as reeve and mayor of Meaford. He ran unsuccessfully for a seat in the provincial assembly in 1886, losing to David Creighton; Cleland defeated Creighton to win the seat in 1890.
