= Grey North (provincial electoral district) =

Ontario electoral district

Defunct provincial electoral district
- Legislature: Legislative Assembly of Ontario
- District created: 1867
- District abolished: 1987
- First contested: 1867
- Last contested: 1985

Grey North was an electoral riding in Ontario, Canada. It was created in 1867 at the time of confederation. It was renamed and redistributed in 1967 as the riding of Grey-Bruce before being abolished in 1986 before the 1987 election. The riding represented Grey County.

== Members of Provincial Parliament ==
Grey North
Assembly	Years	Member	Party
1st	1867–1871	Thomas Scott	Conservative
2nd	1871–1875	Thomas Scott	Conservative
2nd	1875–1875	David Creighton	Conservative
3rd	1875–1879	David Creighton	Conservative
4th	1879–1883	David Creighton	Conservative
5th	1883–1886	David Creighton	Conservative
6th	1886–1890	David Creighton	Conservative
7th	1890–1894	James Cleland	Liberal
8th	1894–1898	James Cleland	Liberal
9th	1898–1902	George Milward Boyd	Conservative
10th	1902–1905	Alexander Grant MacKay	Liberal
11th	1905–1908	Alexander Grant MacKay	Liberal
12th	1908–1911	Alexander Grant MacKay	Liberal
13th	1911–1913	Alexander Grant MacKay	Liberal
13th	1913–1914	Colin Stewart Cameron	Conservative
14th	1914–1919	Colin Stewart Cameron	Conservative
15th	1919–1923	David James Taylor (Note: From 1919 to 1923 was a member of a Liberal-United Farmers Association.)	United Farmers
16th	1923–1926	David James Taylor	United Farmers
17th	1926–1929	David James Taylor	Progressive
18th	1929–1934	David James Taylor	Liberal–Progressive
18th	1934–1934	Roland Patterson	Liberal–Progressive
19th	1934–1937	Roland Patterson	Liberal–Progressive
20th	1937–1943	Roland Patterson	Liberal–Progressive
21st	1943–1945	Roland Patterson	Liberal–Progressive
22nd	1945–1948	Mac Phillips	Progressive Conservative
23rd	1948–1951	Mac Phillips	Progressive Conservative
24th	1951–1955	Mac Phillips	Progressive Conservative
25th	1955–1959	Mac Phillips	Progressive Conservative
26th	1959–1963	Mac Phillips	Progressive Conservative
27th	1963–1967	Eddie Sargent	Liberal
Riding renamed to Grey-Bruce in 1967
28th	1967–1971	Eddie Sargent	Liberal
29th	1971–1975	Eddie Sargent	Liberal
30th	1975–1977	Eddie Sargent	Liberal
31st	1977–1981	Eddie Sargent	Liberal
32nd	1981–1985	Eddie Sargent	Liberal
33rd	1985–1987	Eddie Sargent	Liberal
Sourced from the Ontario Legislative Assembly
Merged into Grey riding after 1987

== Election results ==
=== Grey North (1967–1987) ===
1985 Ontario general election: Grey—Bruce
Party	Candidate	Votes	%	±%
Liberal	Eddie Sargent	14,883	59.97	–0.33
Progressive Conservative	Arlene Wright	7,595	30.60	–2.84
New Democratic	Joanne Shaw	2,340	9.43	+3.16
Total valid votes		24,818	99.36	
Total rejected ballots		160	0.64	+0.35
Turnout		24,978	65.78	+1.48
Eligible voters		37,972		
Liberal hold		Swing		+1.25
Source: Elections Ontario

1981 Ontario general election: Grey—Bruce
Party	Candidate	Votes	%	±%
Liberal	Eddie Sargent	14,006	60.30	+4.82
Progressive Conservative	Bob Rutherford	7,767	33.44	–1.82
New Democratic	Frank Butler	1,455	6.26	–3.00
Total valid votes		23,228	99.71	
Total rejected ballots		67	0.29	–0.02
Turnout		23,295	64.30	–11.14
Eligible voters		36,226		
Liberal hold		Swing		+3.32
Source: Elections Ontario

1977 Ontario general election: Grey—Bruce
Party	Candidate	Votes	%	±%
Liberal	Eddie Sargent	14,828	55.47	+0.08
Progressive Conservative	Harvey Davis	9,425	35.26	+3.15
New Democratic	Bill Proud	2,477	9.27	–3.23
Total valid votes		26,730	99.69	
Total rejected ballots		83	0.31	+0.01
Turnout		26,813	75.45	–0.21
Eligible voters		35,539		
Liberal hold		Swing		–1.53
Source: Elections Ontario

1975 Ontario general election: Grey—Bruce
Party	Candidate	Votes	%	±%
Liberal	Eddie Sargent	14,193	55.39	+9.22
Progressive Conservative	Garry A. Harron	8,229	32.11	–5.14
New Democratic	Lorne Creighton	3,202	12.50	–4.09
Total valid votes		25,624	99.70	
Total rejected ballots		78	0.30	–0.08
Turnout		25,702	75.65	–4.05
Eligible voters		33,974		
Liberal hold		Swing		+7.18
Source: Elections Ontario

1971 Ontario general election: Grey—Bruce
Party	Candidate	Votes	%	±%
Liberal	Eddie Sargent	13,657	46.17	–0.45
Progressive Conservative	Bob Rutherford	11,019	37.25	+0.52
New Democratic	Lorne Creighton	4,905	16.58	–0.06
Total valid votes		29,581	99.62	
Total rejected ballots		113	0.38	–0.10
Turnout		29,694	79.70	+3.98
Eligible voters		37,255		
Liberal hold		Swing		–0.48
Source: Elections Ontario

1967 Ontario general election: Grey—Bruce
Party	Candidate	Votes	%	±%
Liberal	Eddie Sargent	10,837	46.62	–
Progressive Conservative	William Forsyth	8,539	36.73	–
New Democratic	Lorne Creighton	3,869	16.64	–
Total valid votes		23,245	99.52	
Total rejected ballots		112	0.48	–
Turnout		23,357	75.72	–
Eligible voters		30,846		
Liberal hold		Swing		–
Source: Elections Ontario

=== Grey North (1867–1967) ===
1963 Ontario general election
Party	Candidate	Votes	%	±%
Liberal	Eddie Sargent	6,862	44.75	+10.96
Progressive Conservative	William Forsyth	6,831	44.55	–10.49
New Democratic	Percy England	1,642	10.71	–0.47
Total valid votes		15,335	99.46	
Total rejected ballots		83	0.54	–0.20
Turnout		15,418	73.20	+2.27
Eligible voters		21,063		
Liberal gain from Progressive Conservative		Swing		+10.72
Source: Elections Ontario

1959 Ontario general election
Party	Candidate	Votes	%	±%
Progressive Conservative	Mac Phillips	8,167	55.03	+2.29
Liberal	George D. Hilts	5,014	33.79	–7.85
Co-operative Commonwealth	Evan Griffith	1,659	11.18	+5.56
Total valid votes		14,840	99.26	
Total rejected ballots		110	0.74	+0.16
Turnout		14,950	70.93	–10.30
Eligible voters		21,076		
Progressive Conservative hold		Swing		+5.07
Source: Elections Ontario

1955 Ontario general election
Party	Candidate	Votes	%	±%
Progressive Conservative	Mac Phillips	8,910	52.74	–6.00
Liberal	Eddie Sargent	7,034	41.64	+14.07
Co-operative Commonwealth	Stanley James Hutchinson	950	5.62	–8.08
Total valid votes		16,894	99.43	
Total rejected ballots		97	0.57	–0.21
Turnout		16,991	81.23	+6.27
Eligible voters		20,916		
Progressive Conservative hold		Swing		–10.04
Source: Elections Ontario

1951 Ontario general election
Party	Candidate	Votes	%	±%
Progressive Conservative	Mac Phillips	9,068	58.74	+18.96
Liberal	George C. South	4,255	27.56	–9.92
Co-operative Commonwealth	Percy England	2,115	13.70	–9.04
Total valid votes		15,438	99.22	
Total rejected ballots		121	0.78	+0.25
Turnout		15,559	74.97	–1.88
Eligible voters		20,754		
Progressive Conservative hold		Swing		+14.44
Source: Elections Ontario

1948 Ontario general election
Party	Candidate	Votes	%	±%
Progressive Conservative	Mac Phillips	6,649	39.78	–5.85
Liberal	Eddie Sargent	6,266	37.49	–4.43
Co-operative Commonwealth	A. Stanley Latham	3,801	22.74	+10.28
Total valid votes		16,716	99.48	
Total rejected ballots		88	0.52	–0.06
Turnout		16,804	76.85	+3.42
Eligible voters		21,866		
Progressive Conservative hold		Swing		–0.71
Source: Elections Ontario

1945 Ontario general election
Party	Candidate	Votes	%	±%
Progressive Conservative	Mac Phillips	7,275	45.63	+11.10
Liberal	Roland Patterson	6,683	41.91	+4.39
Co-operative Commonwealth	William Clifford Elliott	1,987	12.46	–15.49
Total valid votes		15,945	99.41	
Total rejected ballots		94	0.59	+0.03
Turnout		16,039	73.43	+8.61
Eligible voters		21,842		
Progressive Conservative gain from Liberal		Swing		+3.35
Source: Elections Ontario

1943 Ontario general election
Party	Candidate	Votes	%	±%
Liberal	Roland Patterson	4,826	37.52	–16.70
Progressive Conservative	Mac Phillips	4,441	34.53	–4.79
Co-operative Commonwealth	William Clifford Elliott	3,596	27.96	+21.48
Total valid votes		12,863	99.44	
Total rejected ballots		72	0.56	–0.61
Turnout		12,935	64.82	–12.46
Eligible voters		19,954		
Liberal hold		Swing		–5.95
Source: Elections Ontario

1937 Ontario general election
Party	Candidate	Votes	%	±%
Liberal–Progressive	Roland Patterson	8,511	54.21	–3.10
Conservative	Victor Porteous	6,172	39.31	+4.92
Co-operative Commonwealth	Maurice Christie	1,016	6.47	–1.82
Total valid votes		15,699	98.83	
Total rejected ballots		186	1.17	+1.17
Turnout		15,885	77.28	–
Eligible voters		20,555		
Liberal–Progressive hold		Swing		–4.01
Source: Elections Ontario

Ontario provincial by-election, August 20, 1934 David James Taylor resignation to accept appointment as Deputy Minister of Game and Fisheries
Party	Candidate	Votes	%	±%
Liberal–Progressive	Roland Patterson	7,564	57.31	–3.21
Conservative	Ernest Cooper	4,540	34.40	–5.08
Co-operative Commonwealth	Victor Christie	1,094	8.29	–
Total valid votes		13,198	100.00	
Total rejected ballots		–		
Turnout		13,198	–	–
Eligible voters				
Liberal–Progressive hold		Swing		+0.94
Source: Elections Ontario

1934 Ontario general election
Party	Candidate	Votes	%	±%
Liberal–Progressive	David James Taylor	9,770	60.52	+8.36
Conservative	Ernest Newton Cooper	6,374	39.48	–8.36
Total valid votes		16,144	99.55	
Total rejected ballots		73	0.45	+0.01
Turnout		16,217	79.81	+10.96
Eligible voters		20,320		
Liberal–Progressive gain from Progressive		Swing		+8.36
Source: Elections Ontario

1929 Ontario general election
Party	Candidate	Votes	%	±%
Progressive	David James Taylor	6,912	52.15	–11.57
Conservative	Thomas Henry Randle	6,341	47.85	+11.57
Total valid votes		13,253	99.56	
Total rejected ballots		59	0.44	–0.02
Turnout		13,312	68.85	+0.77
Eligible voters		19,334		
Progressive hold		Swing		–11.57
Source: Elections Ontario

1926 Ontario general election
Party	Candidate	Votes	%	±%
Progressive	David James Taylor	8,423	63.73	+23.23
Conservative	William Breese	4,794	36.27	–3.60
Total valid votes		13,217	99.54	
Total rejected ballots		61	0.46	–0.35
Turnout		13,278	68.08	–0.38
Eligible voters		19,503		
Progressive hold		Swing		+13.41
Source: Elections Ontario

1923 Ontario general election
Party	Candidate	Votes	%	±%
United Farmers	David James Taylor	3,873	40.50	–15.42
Conservative	William Breese	3,813	39.87	–4.21
Liberal	Wallace Edward Dickin	1,877	19.63	–
Total valid votes		9,563	99.19	
Total rejected ballots		78	0.81	–2.13
Turnout		9,641	68.46	–8.73
Eligible voters		14,083		
United Farmers hold		Swing		–5.61
Source: Elections Ontario

1919 Ontario general election
Party	Candidate	Votes	%	±%
Liberal-United Farmers	David James Taylor	5,659	55.92	–
Conservative	Alexander Stevens Donald	4,461	44.08	–12.42
Total valid votes		10,120	97.07	
Total rejected ballots		306	2.94	+2.51
Turnout		10,426	77.18	+1.70
Eligible voters		13,508		
Liberal-United Farmers gain from Conservative		Swing		–
Source: Elections Ontario

1914 Ontario general election
Party	Candidate	Votes	%	±%
Conservative	Colin Stewart Cameron	2,943	56.50	+3.17
Liberal	Thomas Anderson Rodger	2,266	43.50	–3.17
Total valid votes		5,209	99.58	
Total rejected ballots		22	0.42	+0.42
Turnout		5,231	75.48	–
Eligible voters		6,930		
Conservative hold		Swing		+3.17
Source: Elections Ontario

Ontario provincial by-election, July 14, 1913 Resignation of Alexander Grant MacKay to enter Alberta politics
Party	Candidate	Votes	%	±%
Conservative	Colin Stewart Cameron	2,824	53.33	+9.01
Liberal	John McQuaker	2,471	46.67	–9.01
Total valid votes		5,295	100.00	
Total rejected ballots		–		
Turnout		5,295	–	–
Eligible voters				
Conservative gain from Liberal		Swing		+9.01
Source: Elections Ontario

1911 Ontario general election
Party	Candidate	Votes	%	±%
Liberal	Alexander Grant MacKay	3,635	55.67	+5.08
Conservative	George Milward Boyd	2,894	44.33	–5.08
Total valid votes		6,529	99.30	
Total rejected ballots		46	0.70	+0.02
Turnout		6,575	71.93	+1.00
Eligible voters		9,141		
Liberal hold		Swing		+5.08
Source: Elections Ontario

1908 Ontario general election
Party	Candidate	Votes	%	±%
Liberal	Alexander Grant MacKay	3,026	50.59	–1.57
Conservative	George Milward Boyd	2,955	49.41	+1.57
Total valid votes		5,981	99.32	
Total rejected ballots		41	0.68	+0.55
Turnout		6,022	70.93	–6.49
Eligible voters		8,490		
Liberal hold		Swing		–1.57
Source: Elections Ontario

1905 Ontario general election
Party	Candidate	Votes	%	±%
Liberal	Alexander Grant MacKay	3,268	52.16	–0.08
Conservative	George Milward Boyd	2,997	47.84	+0.08
Total valid votes		6,265	99.87	
Total rejected ballots		8	0.13	+0.13
Turnout		6,273	77.42	–
Eligible voters		8,103		
Liberal hold		Swing		–0.08
Source: Elections Ontario

Ontario provincial by-election, January 7, 1903 Void election
Party	Candidate	Votes	%	±%
Liberal	Alexander Grant MacKay	3,171	52.24	+2.20
Conservative	George Milward Boyd	2,899	47.76	–2.20
Total valid votes		6,070	100.00	
Total rejected ballots		–		
Turnout		6,070	–	–
Eligible voters				
Liberal hold		Swing		+2.20
Source: Elections Ontario

1902 Ontario general election
Party	Candidate	Votes	%	±%
Liberal	Alexander Grant MacKay	2,930	50.04	+1.34
Conservative	George Milward Boyd	2,925	49.96	–1.34
Total valid votes		5,855	99.30	
Total rejected ballots		41	0.70	+0.15
Turnout		5,896	78.08	+1.75
Eligible voters		7,551		
Liberal gain from Conservative		Swing		+1.34
Source: Elections Ontario

1898 Ontario general election
Party	Candidate	Votes	%	±%
Conservative	George Milward Boyd	2,707	51.30	+22.55
Liberal	James Cleland	2,570	48.70	+10.61
Total valid votes		5,277	99.45	
Total rejected ballots		29	0.55	+0.11
Turnout		5,306	76.33	+10.30
Eligible voters		6,951		
Conservative gain from Liberal		Swing		+16.58
Source: Elections Ontario

1894 Ontario general election
Party	Candidate	Votes	%	±%
Liberal	James Cleland	1,646	38.09	–16.35
Protestant Protective	Charles Medcalf	1,433	33.16	–
Conservative	Nicholas Read	1,242	28.74	–16.82
Total valid votes		4,321	99.56	
Total rejected ballots		19	0.44	–0.01
Turnout		4,340	66.04	–1.84
Eligible voters		6,572		
Liberal hold		Swing		–8.17
Source: Elections Ontario

1890 Ontario general election
Party	Candidate	Votes	%	±%
Liberal	James Cleland	2,312	54.44	+4.66
Conservative	David Creighton	1,935	45.56	–4.66
Total valid votes		4,247	99.55	
Total rejected ballots		19	0.45	–0.25
Turnout		4,266	67.88	+0.13
Eligible voters		6,285		
Liberal gain from Conservative		Swing		+4.66
Source: Elections Ontario

1886 Ontario general election
Party	Candidate	Votes	%	±%
Conservative	David Creighton	2,076	50.22	–1.75
Liberal	James Cleland	2,058	49.78	+1.75
Total valid votes		4,134	99.30	
Total rejected ballots		29	0.70	+0.09
Turnout		4,163	67.75	–2.39
Eligible voters		6,145		
Conservative hold		Swing		–1.75
Source: Elections Ontario

1883 Ontario general election
Party	Candidate	Votes	%	±%
Conservative	David Creighton	2,048	51.97	+1.69
Liberal	Mr. Doyle	1,893	48.03	–1.69
Total valid votes		3,941	99.39	
Total rejected ballots		24	0.61	+0.61
Turnout		3,965	70.14	+9.16
Eligible voters		5,653		
Conservative hold		Swing		+1.69
Source: Elections Ontario

1879 Ontario general election
Party	Candidate	Votes	%	±%
Conservative	David Creighton	1,660	50.27	−1.60
Liberal	Mr. Doyle	1,642	49.73	
Total valid votes		3,302	60.98	
Eligible voters		5,415		
Conservative hold		Swing		−1.60
Source: Elections Ontario

Ontario provincial by-election, November 1875 Previous election voided
Party	Candidate	Votes	%	±%
Conservative	David Creighton	1,262	51.87	−6.55
Independent	R. McKnight	1,171	48.13	
Total valid votes		2,433		
Conservative hold		Swing		−6.55
Source: History of the Electoral Districts, Legislatures and Ministries of the Province of Ontario

1875 Ontario general election
Party	Candidate	Votes	%	±%
Conservative	Thomas Scott	1,431	53.40	−5.03
Liberal	C. McFayden	1,249	46.60	+5.03
Turnout		2,680	67.59	+17.37
Eligible voters		3,965		
Election voided
Source: Elections Ontario

1871 Ontario general election
Party	Candidate	Votes	%	±%
Conservative	Thomas Scott	1,339	58.42	+3.25
Liberal	Mr. Patterson	953	41.58	−3.25
Turnout		2,292	50.22	−24.41
Eligible voters		4,564		
Conservative hold		Swing		+3.25
Source: Elections Ontario

1867 Ontario general election
Party	Candidate	Votes	%
Conservative	Thomas Scott	1,430	55.17
Liberal	John Cooper	1,162	44.83
Total valid votes		2,592	74.63
Eligible voters		3,473	
Conservative pickup new district.			
Source: Elections Ontario
