= Marietta Roberts =

Canadian politician (1943–2020)

Ontario MPP
- In office 1987–1990
- Preceded by: Ron McNeil
- Succeeded by: Peter North
- Constituency: Elgin

Personal details
- Born: January 9, 1943 Yarmouth Township, Ontario
- Died: October 4, 2020 (aged 77) St. Thomas, Ontario
- Party: Liberal
- Occupation: Teacher, lawyer, judge
- Portfolio: Deputy Government Whip (1989-1990)

Marietta Lola Doreen Roberts (January 9, 1943 – October 4, 2020) was a politician in Ontario, Canada. She was a Liberal member of the Legislative Assembly of Ontario from 1987 to 1990.

== Background ==
Roberts was educated at the University of Western Ontario, the Ontario College of Education and Dalhousie University. She taught at Alma College for three years, and then practiced law in the Elgin County area from 1971 to 1987. She also worked as a farmer. She was a founding member of the Ontario Child Representation Program, and served as the acting crown attorney for Elgin. Roberts also chaired the Elgin County Board of Education.

== Politics ==
She ran for the House of Commons of Canada for the federal Liberal Party in the 1974 federal election, and lost to Progressive Conservative John Wise by 2,502 votes in the riding of Elgin.

She ran for the Ontario legislature in the 1975 provincial election, and lost to Progressive Conservative incumbent Ron McNeil by 1,831 votes in the provincial riding of the same name. She tried again in the 1987 provincial election this time defeating McNeil by 2,447 votes.

She served as a backbench supporter of David Peterson's government for the next three years, and was chair of the Liberal Caucus in 1988 and 1989. She served as Vice-Chair of Select Committee on Constitutional Reform from 1987 to 1989 and as Deputy Government Whip in 1989-1990.

The Liberals were defeated by the New Democratic Party in the 1990 provincial election, and Roberts lost to NDP candidate Peter North.

== Later life ==
In 1991, Roberts was appointed as an Ontario Court of Justice judge. She has been an Associate Chief Justice associate chief judge and coordinator of justices of the peace since 1995. She died on October 4, 2020.
