= Alexander Grant MacKay =

Canadian politician (1860–1920)

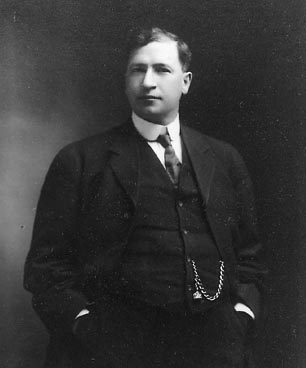

Member of the Legislative Assembly of Alberta
- In office 1913–1920
- Preceded by: Jean Côté
- Succeeded by: George Mills
- Constituency: Athabasca

Ontario MPP
- In office 1902–1913
- Preceded by: George Milward Boyd
- Succeeded by: Colin Stewart Cameron
- Constituency: Grey North

Personal details
- Born: March 7, 1860 Sydenham, Canada West
- Died: April 25, 1920 (aged 60) Edmonton, Alberta
- Party: Alberta Liberal Party
- Other political affiliations: Ontario Liberal Party

Alexander Grant MacKay (March 7, 1860 – April 25, 1920) was a Canadian teacher, lawyer and provincial level politician. He served prominent posts in two provincial legislatures as Leader of the Opposition in Ontario and as a Cabinet Minister in Alberta.

== Early life ==
Alexander Grant MacKay was born in Sydenham, Canada West, in Grey County on March 7, 1860, to parents Hugh MacKay and Katherine McInnis.

He attended post secondary studies at the Owen Sound College and the University of Toronto obtaining a Master of Business degree. After university he became the principal of Port Rowan High School. In 1891 he joined the Ontario bar and served as a criminal lawyer until 1894, when he became Crown Attorney for Grey County. He served that role until 1912.

MacKay began his political career on the municipal level with his election to the Owen Sound Board of Education in 1894. He served in that role until he entered Ontario provincial politics in 1902.

== Ontario politics ==
MacKay ran and was elected to the Ontario legislature in 1902 in the riding of Grey North. He was re-elected in 1905, 1908 and 1911. He served in the government of Premier Ross as Commissioner of Crown Lands until the government's defeat in 1905. On September 7, 1907, MacKay was elected leader of the Ontario Liberal Party and Leader of the Opposition and held that position until he resigned in September 1911. MacKay moved to Alberta in the spring of 1912, he was accused by the Toronto press of leaving Ontario because he was unable to get along with new Liberal opposition leader Newton Rowell. MacKay officially resigned his seat in the Ontario Legislature when he ran in the 1913 Alberta general election on April 12, 1913.

== Alberta politics ==
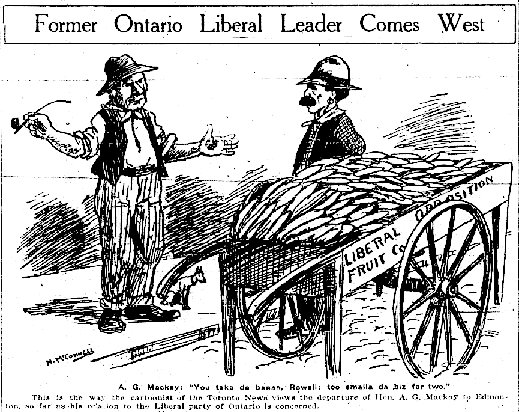
The Toronto Press Lampooning A.G. MacKay for moving west

MacKay ran for the Legislative Assembly of Alberta for the first time in the 1913 Alberta general election resigning his Ontario Legislature seat as soon as the writ was dropped. MacKay ran in the Edmonton electoral district and was defeated finishing a very close 3rd place in the block vote. After his defeat he then ran as the candidate in the deferred Athabasca election on July 30, 1913. In his second attempt at office he defeated Conservative candidate Mayor of Athabasca James Wood by a comfortable margin to win his first term in office. MacKay spent his first term in the Legislature as a back bencher for the government.

MacKay stood for re-election in the 1917 Alberta general election. This time he was returned to his second term in a landslide victory over Conservative candidate A.F. Fugl.

MacKay was appointed to the provincial cabinet on August 26, 1918. He assumed the portfolio of Minister of Municipal Affairs from Wilfrid Gariépy. He was confirmed to his portfolio in a ministerial by-election on September 27, 1918, which he won by acclamation. MacKay was given a second portfolio on June 19, 1919, when he was appointed as Alberta's first Minister of Health. He served both portfolios until he died of pneumonia (arising from the Spanish flu) in the Edmonton General Hospital April 25, 1920.

Party political offices
Preceded by George P. Graham	Ontario Liberal Leader; 1907–1911	Succeeded by Newton Rowell
