= Thomas Scott (Ontario politician) =

Canadian politician

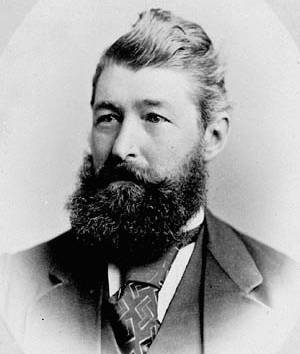

Ontario MPP
- In office 1867–1875
- Preceded by: Riding established
- Succeeded by: David Creighton
- Constituency: Grey North

Personal details
- Born: 1828 Nottingham, England
- Died: 1883 (aged 54–55)
- Party: Conservative

Thomas Scott (c. 1828 – 1883) was a Canadian political figure. He represented Grey North in the Legislative Assembly of Ontario as a Conservative member from 1867 to 1875.

He was born in Nottingham, England. He served on the council for Grey County and also as mayor of Owen Sound.

== Electoral history ==
1867 Ontario general election: Grey North
Party	Candidate	Votes	%
Conservative	Thomas Scott	1,430	55.17
Liberal	John Cooper	1,162	44.83
Total valid votes		2,592	74.63
Eligible voters		3,473	
Conservative pickup new district.			
Source: Elections Ontario

1871 Ontario general election: Grey North
Party	Candidate	Votes	%	±%
Conservative	Thomas Scott	1,339	58.42	+3.25
Liberal	Mr. Patterson	953	41.58	−3.25
Turnout		2,292	50.22	−24.41
Eligible voters		4,564		
Conservative hold		Swing		+3.25
Source: Elections Ontario

1875 Ontario general election: Grey North
Party	Candidate	Votes	%	±%
Conservative	Thomas Scott	1,431	53.40	−5.03
Liberal	C. McFayden	1,249	46.60	+5.03
Turnout		2,680	67.59	+17.37
Eligible voters		3,965		
Election voided
Source: Elections Ontario
