= Ted Bounsall =

Canadian politician (1935–2023)

Ontario MPP
- In office 1975–1981
- Preceded by: New riding
- Succeeded by: Bill Wrye
- Constituency: Windsor—Sandwich
- In office 1971–1975
- Preceded by: Hugh Peacock
- Succeeded by: Riding abolished
- Constituency: Windsor West

Personal details
- Born: November 6, 1935 Bowmanville, Ontario, Canada
- Died: December 4, 2023 (aged 88)
- Party: New Democrat
- Occupation: University professor

Edwin James "Ted" Bounsall (November 6, 1935 – December 4, 2023) was a Canadian politician. He was a NDP member of the Legislative Assembly of Ontario from 1971 to 1981. He represented the ridings of Windsor West from 1971 to 1975 and Windsor—Sandwich from 1975 to 1981. He served under the leadership of Stephen Lewis and Michael Cassidy.

== Background ==
Bounsall was born in 1935 in Bowmanville, Ontario. He was a chemistry professor at the University of Windsor who graduated from Imperial College in 1964.

== Politics ==
Bounsall was an Ontario New Democratic Party member of the Legislative Assembly of Ontario representing the provincial ridings of Windsor West (1971–1975) and Windsor—Sandwich (1975–1981). During his ten years in the Legislature, he served on numerous legislative committees. He was also one of the earlier advocates for pay equity for women in Ontario. He lost by 134 votes in the 1981 provincial election to Ontario Liberal Party candidate Bill Wrye.

In 1982, Bounsall was elected as an alderman for Windsor City Council. He served six years until 1988 representing Ward 2. He remains politically active as part of the Windsor West New Democratic Party Riding Association and is a supporter of NDP Member of Parliament Brian Masse and Windsor Ward 2 City Councillor Ron Jones.

In 1985, Bounsall was charged with shoplifting a bottle of vitamins from a drug store. Bounsall claimed that he absentmindedly put the bottle in his pocket and forgot to pay for it when he walked out. The judge did not believe his explanation and found him guilty on the charge. Bounsall was given an absolute discharge but the incident forced him to retire from politics.

== Later life and death ==
Bounsall returned to teaching after retiring from politics. He died on December 4, 2023, at the age of 88.
