= David Creighton =

Canadian politician (1843–1917)

Ontario MPP
- In office 1875–1890
- Preceded by: Thomas Scott
- Succeeded by: James Cleland
- Constituency: Grey North

Personal details
- Born: April 1, 1843 Glasgow, Scotland
- Died: November 7, 1917 (aged 74) Toronto, Ontario
- Party: Conservative
- Spouse: Jane Elizabeth Kramer (m. 1873)
- Occupation: Newspaper editor

David Creighton (April 1, 1843 – November 7, 1917) was an Ontario businessman and political figure. He represented Grey North in the Legislative Assembly of Ontario from 1875 to 1890 as a Conservative member.

He was born in Glasgow, Scotland in 1843; his parents were of Irish descent. Creighton came to Canada West with his family in 1855. He became editor and publisher of the Owen Sound Times in 1864, retiring in 1896. In 1873, he married Jane Elizabeth Kramer. He was first elected to the assembly in an 1875 by-election held after the election of Thomas Scott was declared invalid. He helped establish the newspaper The Empire at Toronto, which operated from 1887 to 1895. In 1895, Creighton was appointed assistant Receiver-General at Toronto.

The community of Creighton Mine, now a ghost town in Greater Sudbury, was named after him. He died in 1917.

== Electoral history ==
Ontario provincial by-election, November 1875: Grey North Previous election voided
Party	Candidate	Votes	%	±%
Conservative	David Creighton	1,262	51.87	−6.55
Independent	R. McKnight	1,171	48.13	
Total valid votes		2,433		
Conservative hold		Swing		−6.55
Source: History of the Electoral Districts, Legislatures and Ministries of the Province of Ontario

1879 Ontario general election: Grey North
Party	Candidate	Votes	%	±%
Conservative	David Creighton	1,660	50.27	−1.60
Liberal	Mr. Doyle	1,642	49.73	
Total valid votes		3,302	60.98	
Eligible voters		5,415		
Conservative hold		Swing		−1.60
Source: Elections Ontario
