= Fletcher Stewart Thomas =

Canadian politician

Tommy Thomas

Ontario MPP
- In office June 4, 1945 – November 9, 1957
- Preceded by: Mitchell Hepburn
- Succeeded by: Ron McNeil
- Constituency: Elgin

Personal details
- Born: June 7, 1897 Toronto Township, Ontario, Canada
- Died: November 9, 1957 (aged 60) St Thomas, Ontario, Canada
- Resting place: Elmdale Memorial Park Cemetery
- Party: Progressive Conservative
- Spouse: Myrtle Symes
- Children: Patricia, Carolyn, Shirley and Robert
- Education: Ontario Agricultural College
- Occupation: Agricultural agent

Military service
- Allegiance: Canadian
- Branch/service: Canadian Field Artillery
- Years of service: 1916–1919
- Rank: Gunner
- Unit: 56th Battery
- Battles/wars: World War I, North Russia Intervention

Fletcher Stewart Pickering "Tommy" Thomas (June 7, 1897 – November 9, 1957) was a politician in Ontario, Canada. He was a Progressive Conservative member of the Legislative Assembly of Ontario from 1945 to 1957 who represented the central Ontario riding of Elgin. He served as a cabinet minister under Leslie Frost, holding two successive positions between 1951 and 1956.

== Background ==
Born in 1897 in Toronto Township, Ontario to Joseph P. Thomas and Maggie Stewart, Thomas and his mother moved to Streetsville nine years later following the death of his father.

In 1915, he enrolled at the Ontario Agricultural College, but put his studies on hold in 1916 to enlist as a gunner in the Canadian Field Artillery. He served in France and was also one of the "Polar Bears" in the North Russia Intervention before being discharged in 1919.

Returning to OAC, he graduated in 1922 and became an agricultural agent working in Grey County, Port Arthur and Elgin County (serving in the last area for 19 years). He became a farmer in Elgin County in 1935, specializing in tobacco and apples. In 1940, he was instrumental in organizing the first International Plowing Match to be held there.

He died in 1957. He is buried in Elmdale Memorial Park Cemetery.

== Politics ==
In the 1945 Ontario election, Thomas ran as a Progressive Conservative candidate in the riding of Elgin, defeating Mitchell Hepburn. Modest in victory, he said in his acceptance speech, "I am no wonder boy, and I repeat, I don't crave publicity. My ambition now is to be a good member for Elgin and to spend the rest of my time looking after my farm."

He would later be reelected in the 1948, 1951 and 1955 elections.

In 1951, he was appointed as Minister of Public Works in the government of Leslie Frost, where he was in charge of coordinating the province's conservation projects. In 1953 he was appointed as Minister of Agriculture. As Ministers of Agriculture, he led the organization of the first cooperative marketing schemes for fruit and tobacco growers. He also went to the Supreme Court of Canada in order to clarify the status of Ontario's agricultural marketing legislation. He resigned from his role as Minister in 1956 because of ill health, but continued to serve in the Legislature.

On his death in 1957, Leslie Frost said in tribute, "In both posts, the tremendous contribution he made to the great farming community of Ontario, and in connection with conservation works, was of a high order indeed."

=== Cabinet posts ===
Frost ministry, Province of Ontario (1949–1961)
Cabinet posts (2)
Predecessor	Office	Successor
Thomas Laird Kennedy	Minister of Agriculture; 1953-1956	William Arthur Goodfellow
George Doucett	Minister of Public Works; 1951-1953	William Griesinger
