= Mac Phillips =

Canadian politician

Ontario MPP
- In office 1945–1963
- Preceded by: Roland Patterson
- Succeeded by: Eddie Sargent
- Constituency: Grey North

Personal details
- Born: April 9, 1889 Dundalk, Ontario
- Died: June 14, 1963 (aged 64) Owen Sound, Ontario
- Party: Progressive Conservative
- Spouse: Erla MacKay
- Children: 2
- Occupation: Physician

Military service
- Allegiance: Canadian
- Branch/service: Royal Canadian Artillery
- Years of service: 1917-1918
- Unit: 45th Battery

Mackinnon "Mac" Phillips (December 9, 1898 – June 14, 1963) was a politician in Ontario, Canada. He was a Progressive Conservative member of the Legislative Assembly of Ontario from 1945 to 1963 who represented the central Ontario riding of Grey North. He served as cabinet minister in the government of Leslie Frost.

== Background ==
Phillips was born in Dundalk, Ontario. He served in World War I with the 45th battery of the Royal Canadian Artillery. He graduated from the University of Toronto and began work as a physician in the Owen Sound, Ontario area. In 1926, he married Erla MacKay of Fort William. Together they raised two children. He died of a heart attack on June 14, 1963.

== Politics ==
In the 1945 provincial election, Phillips ran as the PC candidate in the riding of Grey North. He defeated Liberal Roland Patterson by 592 votes. He was re-elected four more times before his death in 1963. On August 8, 1950, Phillips was appointed as Minister of Health replacing Russell Kelley who was in ill-health. He stayed in this portfolio through much of the 1950s. He was responsible for helping to organize the Ontario Health Insurance Plan, instituting a program to certify nurse's assistants and laying the foundation for the province's mental health hospitals. On December 22, 1958 he was shuffled to Provincial Secretary and Registrar.

=== Cabinet positions ===
Frost ministry, Province of Ontario (1949–1961)
Cabinet posts (2)
| Predecessor | Office | Successor |
|---|---|---|
| George Dunbar | Provincial Secretary and Registrar; 1958-1960 | John Yaremko |
| Russell Kelley | Minister of Health; 1950-1958 | Matthew Dymond |
