= Elgin (provincial electoral district) =

Ontario electoral district

Defunct provincial electoral district
- Legislature: Legislative Assembly of Ontario
- District created: 1934
- District abolished: 1996
- First contested: 1934
- Last contested: 1995

Elgin was a provincial riding in Ontario, Canada, that was created for the 1934 election. It was abolished prior to the 1999 election. It was merged into the riding of Elgin-Middlesex.

== Members of Provincial Parliament ==
Elgin
Assembly	Years	Member	Party
Created in 1934 from Elgin East and Elgin West
19th	1934–1937	Mitchell Hepburn (Note: In 1938, the title of Member of the Legislative Assembly was officially changed to Member of Provincial Parliament. Previously, it was unofficially used in the media and in the Legislature.)	Liberal
20th	1937–1943	Mitchell Hepburn	Liberal
21st	1943–1945	Mitchell Hepburn	Independent-Liberal
22nd	1945–1948	Fletcher Stewart Thomas	Progressive Conservative
23rd	1948–1951	Fletcher Stewart Thomas	Progressive Conservative
24th	1951–1955	Fletcher Stewart Thomas	Progressive Conservative
25th	1955–1957	Fletcher Stewart Thomas	Progressive Conservative
25th	1957–1959	Ron McNeil	Progressive Conservative
26th	1959–1963	Ron McNeil	Progressive Conservative
27th	1963–1967	Ron McNeil	Progressive Conservative
28th	1967–1971	Ron McNeil	Progressive Conservative
29th	1971–1975	Ron McNeil	Progressive Conservative
30th	1975–1977	Ron McNeil	Progressive Conservative
31st	1977–1981	Ron McNeil	Progressive Conservative
32nd	1981–1985	Ron McNeil	Progressive Conservative
33rd	1985–1987	Ron McNeil	Progressive Conservative
34th	1987–1990	Marietta Roberts	Liberal
35th	1990–1993	Peter North	New Democratic
35th	1993–1995	Peter North	Independent
36th	1995–1999	Peter North	Independent
Sourced from the Ontario Legislative Assembly
Merged into Elgin—Middlesex—London before the 1999 election

== Election results ==
1995 Ontario general election
Party	Candidate	Votes	%	±%
Independent	Peter North	12,436	37.79	–3.88
Progressive Conservative	James Williams	10,660	32.39	+5.87
Liberal	Barry Fitzgerald	5,801	17.63	–10.93
New Democratic	Hugh MacGinnis	3,445	10.47	–31.21
Freedom	George (Ray) Monteith	565	1.72	–1.53
Total valid votes		32,907	99.33	
Total rejected, unmarked and declined ballots		222	0.67	–0.38
Turnout		33,129	61.17	–5.34
Eligible voters		54,155		
Independent hold		Swing		–
Source: Elections Ontario

1990 Ontario general election
Party	Candidate	Votes	%	±%
New Democratic	Peter North	14,189	41.67	+17.99
Liberal	Marietta Roberts	9,723	28.56	–12.52
Progressive Conservative	James Williams	9,031	26.53	–7.03
Freedom	George (Ray) Monteith	1,104	3.24	+1.56
Total valid votes		34,047	98.95	
Total rejected, unmarked and declined ballots		363	1.05	+0.65
Turnout		34,410	66.51	–0.20
Eligible voters		51,735		
New Democratic gain from Liberal		Swing		+12.51
Source: Elections Ontario

1987 Ontario general election
Party	Candidate	Votes	%	±%
Liberal	Marietta Roberts	13,310	41.08	+8.04
Progressive Conservative	Ron McNeil	10,873	33.56	–11.73
New Democratic	Gord Campbell	7,674	23.68	+3.31
Freedom	George (Ray) Monteith	546	1.69	–
Total valid votes		32,403	99.60	
Total rejected ballots		131	0.40	–0.12
Turnout		32,534	66.71	+4.69
Eligible voters		48,770		
Liberal gain from Progressive Conservative		Swing		+9.89
Source: Elections Ontario

1985 Ontario general election
Party	Candidate	Votes	%	±%
Progressive Conservative	Ron McNeil	11,816	45.29	–10.13
Liberal	Peter Charlton	8,619	33.03	+2.17
New Democratic	Gord Campbell	5,315	20.37	+6.64
Independent	Rhinoceros Colmar	342	1.31	–
Total valid votes		26,092	99.48	
Total rejected ballots		137	0.52	+0.17
Turnout		26,229	62.02	+3.30
Eligible voters		42,289		
Progressive Conservative hold		Swing		–6.15
Source: Elections Ontario

1981 Ontario general election
Party	Candidate	Votes	%	±%
Progressive Conservative	Ron McNeil	13,119	55.41	+7.94
Liberal	Maurice Dillon	7,306	30.86	–3.56
New Democratic	Gord Campbell	3,250	13.73	–3.73
Total valid votes		23,675	99.65	
Total rejected ballots		83	0.35	–0.01
Turnout		23,758	58.73	–10.12
Eligible voters		40,456		
Progressive Conservative hold		Swing		+5.75
Source: Elections Ontario

1977 Ontario general election
Party	Candidate	Votes	%	±%
Progressive Conservative	Ron McNeil	12,655	47.48	+3.50
Liberal	Dave Cook	9,174	34.42	–2.79
New Democratic	Colin L. Swan	4,654	17.46	–1.36
Independent	William Triska	172	0.65	–
Total valid votes		26,655	99.64	
Total rejected ballots		97	0.36	+0.09
Turnout		26,752	68.85	–2.39
Eligible voters		38,858		
Progressive Conservative hold		Swing		+3.14
Source: Elections Ontario

1975 Ontario general election
Party	Candidate	Votes	%	±%
Progressive Conservative	Ron McNeil	11,880	43.98	–1.10
Liberal	Marietta Roberts	10,051	37.21	+5.35
New Democratic	Bob McNaughton	5,084	18.82	–3.59
Total valid votes		27,015	99.72	
Total rejected ballots		75	0.28	–0.35
Turnout		27,090	71.23	–7.75
Eligible voters		38,030		
Progressive Conservative hold		Swing		–3.23
Source: Elections Ontario

1971 Ontario general election
Party	Candidate	Votes	%	±%
Progressive Conservative	Ron McNeil	14,742	45.08	+0.13
Liberal	Edward O. Fanjoy	10,417	31.85	–11.05
New Democratic	Barry P. Whittaker	7,329	22.41	+15.94
Independent	William Triska	215	0.66	–
Total valid votes		32,703	99.37	
Total rejected ballots		207	0.63	–0.48
Turnout		32,910	78.98	+10.75
Eligible voters		41,668		
Progressive Conservative hold		Swing		+5.59
Source: Elections Ontario

1967 Ontario general election
Party	Candidate	Votes	%	±%
Progressive Conservative	Ron McNeil	10,662	44.95	–17.87
Liberal	Stanley C. Smith	10,177	42.90	+5.71
New Democratic	Frank Szucs	1,535	6.47	–
Independent	David A. Monteith	1,348	5.68	–
Total valid votes		23,722	98.90	
Total rejected ballots		265	1.10	+0.22
Turnout		23,987	68.23	+5.35
Eligible voters		35,154		
Progressive Conservative hold		Swing		–11.79
Source: Elections Ontario

1963 Ontario general election
Party	Candidate	Votes	%	±%
Progressive Conservative	Ron McNeil	11,382	62.81	+11.21
Liberal	Lloyd S. Gurr	6,739	37.19	–4.08
Total valid votes		18,121	99.11	
Total rejected ballots		162	0.89	+0.01
Turnout		18,283	62.89	+0.16
Eligible voters		29,072		
Progressive Conservative hold		Swing		+7.65
Source: Elections Ontario

1959 Ontario general election
Party	Candidate	Votes	%	±%
Progressive Conservative	Ron McNeil	9,157	51.60	+1.31
Liberal	Lloyd S. Gurr	7,324	41.27	+9.66
Co-operative Commonwealth	Beatrice Jean Ellis	963	5.43	–2.09
Social Credit	Philip Verheyden	302	1.70	–
Total valid votes		17,746	99.12	
Total rejected ballots		157	0.88	+0.06
Turnout		17,903	62.73	+0.59
Eligible voters		28,542		
Progressive Conservative hold		Swing		–4.18
Source: Elections Ontario

Ontario provincial by-election, January 30, 1958 Death of Fletcher Stewart Thomas
Party	Candidate	Votes	%	±%
Progressive Conservative	Ron McNeil	8,728	50.29	–10.60
Liberal	Ralph Auckland	5,486	31.61	+4.39
Independent Progressive Conservative	David Monteith	1,836	10.58	–
Co-operative Commonwealth	Lyal Tait	1,304	7.51	–4.38
Total valid votes		17,354	99.18	
Total rejected ballots		143	0.82	–0.05
Turnout		17,497	62.13	+2.74
Eligible voters		28,160		
Progressive Conservative hold		Swing		–7.50
Source: Elections Ontario

1955 Ontario general election
Party	Candidate	Votes	%	±%
Progressive Conservative	Fletcher Stewart Thomas	9,741	60.89	+5.81
Liberal	Harry Alward	4,354	27.22	–10.20
Co-operative Commonwealth	Lyal Tait	1,902	11.89	+4.39
Total valid votes		15,997	99.13	
Total rejected ballots		140	0.87	–0.10
Turnout		16,137	59.40	–10.40
Eligible voters		27,168		
Progressive Conservative hold		Swing		+8.01
Source: Elections Ontario

1951 Ontario general election
Party	Candidate	Votes	%	±%
Progressive Conservative	Fletcher Stewart Thomas	10,501	55.08	+10.50
Liberal	Henry W. Parker	7,134	37.42	–3.74
Co-operative Commonwealth	Colin Charles Stafford	1,430	7.50	–6.76
Total valid votes		19,065	99.03	
Total rejected ballots		186	0.97	+0.08
Turnout		19,251	69.80	+5.40
Eligible voters		27,581		
Progressive Conservative hold		Swing		+7.12
Source: Elections Ontario

1948 Ontario general election
Party	Candidate	Votes	%	±%
Progressive Conservative	Fletcher Stewart Thomas	7,713	44.58	–7.71
Liberal	Ralph Auckland	7,121	41.16	+1.09
Co-operative Commonwealth	Colin Charles Stafford	2,467	14.26	+6.63
Total valid votes		17,301	99.11	
Total rejected ballots		155	0.89	+0.31
Turnout		17,456	64.40	–11.46
Eligible voters		27,106		
Progressive Conservative hold		Swing		–4.40
Source: Elections Ontario

1945 Ontario general election
Party	Candidate	Votes	%	±%
Progressive Conservative	Fletcher Stewart Thomas	10,278	52.29	+20.82
Liberal	Mitchell Hepburn	7,876	40.07	–10.59
Co-operative Commonwealth	Elisha Lazenby	1,500	7.63	–10.23
Total valid votes		19,654	99.42	
Total rejected ballots		115	0.58	+0.17
Turnout		19,769	75.86	+18.94
Eligible voters		26,060		
Progressive Conservative gain from Liberal		Swing		+15.70
Source: Elections Ontario

1943 Ontario general election
Party	Candidate	Votes	%	±%
Liberal	Mitchell Hepburn	6,879	50.66	–11.86
Progressive Conservative	John Handford	4,274	31.48	–4.20
Co-operative Commonwealth	Elisha Lazenby	2,425	17.86	+16.06
Total valid votes		13,578	99.59	
Total rejected ballots		56	0.41	–0.42
Turnout		13,634	56.92	–21.16
Eligible voters		23,955		
Liberal hold		Swing		–3.83
Source: Elections Ontario

1937 Ontario general election
Party	Candidate	Votes	%	±%
Liberal	Mitchell Hepburn	12,361	62.53	+5.95
Conservative	Norman Roy Martin	7,053	35.68	–7.75
Co-operative Commonwealth	John Tough	355	1.80	–
Total valid votes		19,769	99.17	
Total rejected ballots		165	0.83	+0.31
Turnout		19,934	78.08	–4.05
Eligible voters		25,531		
Liberal hold		Swing		+6.85
Source: Elections Ontario

1934 Ontario general election
Party	Candidate	Votes	%
Liberal	Mitchell Hepburn	11,922	56.58
Conservative	Herbert James Davis	9,150	43.42
Total valid votes		21,072	99.49
Total rejected ballots		109	0.51
Turnout		21,181	82.13
Eligible voters		25,790	
Liberal pickup new district.			
Source: Elections Ontario
