= Teresa Piruzza =

Canadian politician

The Honourable Teresa Piruzza ECO

Ontario MPP
- In office 2011–2014
- Preceded by: Sandra Pupatello
- Succeeded by: Lisa Gretzky
- Constituency: Windsor West

Personal details
- Born: 1968 (age 57–58)
- Party: Liberal
- Spouse: John
- Children: 2
- Occupation: Manager

Teresa Piruzza (born c. 1968) is a former politician in Ontario, Canada. She was a Liberal member of the Legislative Assembly of Ontario from 2011 to 2014 who represented the southwestern riding of Windsor West. She was a cabinet minister in the government of Kathleen Wynne.

== Background ==
Piruzza grew up in Windsor, Ontario. She attended the University of Windsor where she obtained a BA in international relations and an MBA. She worked for the municipality as an executive director. She lives in Windsor with her husband John and their two sons.

== Politics ==
Piruzza has a long association with the Ontario Liberal Party. She worked on campaigns for Herb Gray, former Windsor-Sandwich MPP Bill Wrye, and was the campaign manager for Sandra Pupatello in both 1995 and 1999. She also worked as Pupatello's constituency assistant before starting a successful career in the public sector.

In the 2011 provincial election, Piruzza ran as the Liberal candidate in the riding of Windsor West after Pupatello announced her retirement. She won the riding by 3,583 votes over NDP rival Helmi Charif. Shortly after being elected she was appointed parliamentary assistant to both the Minister of Citizenship and Immigration and the Minister Responsible for Women’s Issues. Following the 2013 Ontario Liberal Party leadership convention, Piruzza was appointed Minister of Children and Youth Services by new Premier Kathleen Wynne.

She was defeated in the 2014 election by New Democrat Lisa Gretzky. Following her defeat, there was some speculation that she would announce her candidacy for Mayor of Windsor, Ontario in the city's 2014 municipal election, but she announced on August 8 that she was joining Chrysler Canada in an executive role.

=== Cabinet positions ===
Wynne ministry, Province of Ontario (2013–2018)
Cabinet post (1)
Predecessor	Office	Successor
Laurel Broten	Minister of Children and Youth Services; 2013–2014; Also responsible for women's issues	Tracy MacCharles

== Election results ==
2014 Ontario general election
Party	Candidate	Votes	%	±%
New Democratic	Lisa Gretzky	15,043	41.4	+10.57
Liberal	Teresa Piruzza	14,001	38.5	-2.77
Progressive Conservative	Henry Lau	5,225	14.4	-10.40
Green	Chad Durocher	1,171	3.2	+0.15
Ind	Helmi Charif	891	2.5	+2.45
Total valid votes		36,331	100.00	
Source: Elections Ontario

2011 Ontario general election
Party	Candidate	Votes	%	±%
Liberal	Teresa Piruzza	14,127	41.3	-8.88
New Democratic	Helmi Charif	10,544	30.8	+5.11
Progressive Conservative	Todd Branch	8,476	24.8	+7.85
Green	Chad Durocher	1,051	3.1	-2.84
Total valid votes		34,198	100.00	
Source: Elections Ontario
