= Lisa Gretzky =

Canadian politician (born 1971)

Lisa Gretzky MPP
- Gretzky in 2026

Deputy House Leader of the Ontario New Democratic Party
- Incumbent
- Assumed office July 13, 2022
- Leader: Marit Stiles

Critic, Mental Health and Addictions
- Incumbent
- Assumed office July 13, 2022
- Leader: Peter Tabuns (interim)

Critic, Community and Social Services
- In office August 23, 2018 – June 2, 2022
- Leader: Andrea Horwath

Critic, Community Safety and Correctional Services
- In office June 25, 2014 – June 7, 2018
- Leader: Andrea Horwath

Member of the Ontario Provincial Parliament for Windsor West
- Incumbent
- Assumed office June 12, 2014
- Preceded by: Teresa Piruzza

Personal details
- Born: January 19, 1971 (age 55)
- Party: New Democratic
- Spouse: Tyler Gretzky
- Relations: Wayne Gretzky (Cousin-in-law)
- Children: 2
- Profession: Event planner

Lisa Gretzky (born January 19, 1971) is a politician in Ontario, Canada. She is a New Democratic Party member of the Legislative Assembly of Ontario, who was elected in 2014 and re-elected in 2018, 2022, and 2025. She represents the riding of Windsor West.

== Background ==
She is the cousin-in-law of Wayne Gretzky through her husband Tyler Gretzky.

== Politics ==
Gretzky was elected as a school trustee in 2008 for the Greater Essex County District School Board. She was elected as vice-chair in 2012.

Gretzky ran in the 2014 provincial election as the New Democratic candidate in the riding of Windsor West. She defeated Liberal incumbent Teresa Piruzza by 1,042 votes.

She was the party's critic for Community Safety and Correctional Services, but as of March 23, 2015, she served as the party's critic for Education. As of September 7, 2024, she serves as the Official Opposition Critic for Mental Health and Addiction, and Poverty and Homelessness Reduction.

== Election results ==
2025 Ontario general election: Windsor West
Party	Candidate	Votes	%	±%	Expenditures
New Democratic	Lisa Gretzky	19,392	52.12	+9.93	$77,661
Progressive Conservative	Tony Francis	14,665	39.42	+4.11	$99,190
Ontario Party	Matthew Giancola	1,019	2.74	–1.91	$1,719
Green	Nick Kolasky	868	2.33	–0.44	$1,412
None of the Above	Mark Dewdney	740	1.98	N/A	$0
New Blue	Joshua Griffin	520	1.40	–0.58	$0
Total valid votes/expense limit		37,204	99.01	-0.09	$156,273
Total rejected, unmarked, and declined ballots		371	0.99	+0.09	
Turnout		37,575	38.81	+5.19	
Eligible voters		96,825			
New Democratic hold		Swing		+7.02	
Source: Elections Ontario

2022 Ontario general election: Windsor West
Party	Candidate	Votes	%	±%	Expenditures
New Democratic	Lisa Gretzky	13,395	42.19	−9.94	$78,770
Progressive Conservative	John Leontowicz	11,211	35.31	+6.84	$49,964
Liberal	Linda L. McCurdy	4,159	13.10	−1.61	$15,222
Ontario Party	Jeremy Palko	1,478	4.65		$14,028
Green	Krysta Glovasky-Ridsdale	879	2.77	−0.81	$381
New Blue	Joshua Griffin	630	1.98		$793
Total valid votes/expense limit		31,752	99.10	+0.06	$133,413
Total rejected, unmarked, and declined ballots		287	0.90	-0.06	
Turnout		32,039	33.62	-9.68	
Eligible voters		94,977			
New Democratic hold		Swing		−8.39	
Source(s): "Summary of Valid Votes Cast for Each Candidate" (PDF). Elections Ontario. 2022. Archived from the original on 2023-05-18.; "Statistical Summary by Electoral District" (PDF). Elections Ontario. 2022. Archived from the original on 2023-05-21.

2018 Ontario general election: Windsor West
Party	Candidate	Votes	%	±%
New Democratic	Lisa Gretzky	20,276	52.12	+10.85
Progressive Conservative	Adam Ibrahim	11,073	28.47	+14.00
Liberal	Rino Bortolin	5,722	14.71	-23.75
Green	Krysta Glovasky-Ridsdale	1,393	3.58	+0.25
None of the Above	Chad Durocher	435	1.12	
Total valid votes		38,899	99.04	+0.45
Total rejected, unmarked and declined ballots		376	0.96	-0.45
Turnout		39,275	43.30	+0.59
Eligible voters		90,698		
New Democratic hold		Swing		
Source: Elections Ontario

2014 Ontario general election: Windsor West
Party	Candidate	Votes	%	±%
New Democratic	Lisa Gretzky	15,043	41.41	+10.44
Liberal	Teresa Piruzza	14,001	38.54	-2.85
Progressive Conservative	Henry Lau	5,225	14.38	-10.32
Green	Chad Durocher	1,171	3.22	+0.26
Independent	Helmi Charif	891	2.45	-28.36
Total valid votes		36,331	98.59	-0.79
Total rejected, unmarked and declined ballots		518	1.41	+0.79
Turnout		36,849	42.71	+1.14
Eligible voters		86,285		
New Democratic gain from Liberal		Swing		+6.65
Source: Elections Ontario
