= Colin Stewart Cameron =

Canadian politician

Ontario MPP
- In office 1913–1919
- Preceded by: Alexander Grant MacKay
- Succeeded by: David James Taylor
- Constituency: Grey North

Personal details
- Born: Ross-shire, Scotland
- Party: Conservative
- Spouse: Margaret Goodson Burnhart (m.1908)
- Occupation: Lawyer

Colin Stewart Cameron was a Scottish-born lawyer and political figure in Ontario, Canada. He represented Grey North in the Legislative Assembly of Ontario from July 1913 to 1914 and from 1914 to 1919 as a Conservative member.

He was born in Ross-shire, Scotland, the son of William Cameron. He was educated in Port Elgin, Owen Sound, at the University of Toronto and Osgoode Hall. Cameron was a barrister, solicitor and notary public. In 1908, he married Margaret Goodson Burnhart. He served as chair for the Board of Education in Owen Sound. He was elected to the provincial assembly in a 1913 by-election held after Alexander Grant MacKay moved to Alberta.
