= Ron McNeil =

Canadian politician

Ontario MPP
- In office 1958–1987
- Preceded by: Fletcher Thomas
- Succeeded by: Marietta Roberts
- Constituency: Elgin

Personal details
- Born: January 15, 1920 Springfield, Ontario
- Died: March 18, 2003 (aged 83) Lyons, Ontario
- Party: Progressive Conservative
- Spouse: Doris (1987-2000)
- Occupation: Farmer

Ronald Keith McNeil (January 15, 1920 – March 18, 2003) was a politician in Ontario, Canada. He served in the Legislative Assembly of Ontario from 1958 to 1987, as a member of the Progressive Conservative Party.

== Background ==
McNeil was born in Springfield, Ontario. He majored in field husbandry at the Ontario Agricultural College in Guelph, and received his degree in 1942. He worked as a livestock farmer. McNeil was a bachelor until age 65. He married his wife Doris in 1987 who predeceased him in 2000.

== Municipal politics ==
McNeil served on the municipal council of South Dorchester from 1946 to 1948, was its reeve from 1949 to 1952, and was a warden of Elgin County in 1952. Also in 1952, he served as chair of the centennial committee for Elgin and St. Thomas.

== Provincial politics ==
He was elected to the Ontario legislature in a by-election held on January 30, 1958, in the constituency of Elgin. He defeated Liberal candidate Ralph Auckland by 3,246 votes, and served in the legislature as a backbench supporter of Leslie Frost's administration. He was re-elected in the general elections of 1959, 1963, 1967, 1971, 1975, 1977, 1981 and 1985. McNeil came close to losing in 1967 and 1975, but on other occasions won re-election by fairly significant margins.

Despite his long service in the house, McNeil was never appointed to cabinet. He served as parliamentary assistant to the Minister of Agriculture and Food from 1977 to 1985. He was known for his efforts to keep the Ontario Police College in Aylmer.

McNeil was defeated in the 1987 provincial election, losing to Liberal candidate Marietta Roberts by 2,437 votes. Roberts had finished a close second to McNeil in the 1975 election.

== Later life ==
After the election, McNeil returned to his farm in Lyons. McNeil died in 2003. Norm Sterling, speaking in the Ontario legislature on his death, described him as a quiet, respected man who made few legislative speeches. He said of McNeil "he was one of those MPPs who never forgot where he came from, and during all that time he served everyone who came to him for help." There is currently a Ron McNeil Road in Springfield.
