= Roland Patterson =

Canadian politician

Ontario MPP
- In office 1934–1945
- Preceded by: David James Taylor
- Succeeded by: Mac Phillips
- Constituency: Grey North

Personal details
- Born: January 21, 1883 North Keppel, Ontario
- Died: October 12, 1968 (aged 85)
- Party: Liberal-Progressive, 1934-1943; Liberal, 1943-1945
- Spouse: Mabel Owen (m. 1907)
- Children: 3
- Occupation: Insurance agent

Roland Patterson (January 21, 1883 – October 12, 1968) was an insurance agent and politician in the province of Ontario, Canada. He represented Grey North in the Legislative Assembly of Ontario from 1934 to 1945 as a Liberal-Progressive and then Liberal member.

The son of James Reuben Patterson and Alice Maude Mouck, he was born in North Keppel and was educated there and in Wiarton. He taught school for three years and then attended Northern Business College in Owen Sound. He established his insurance agency in 1905. In 1907, Patterson married Mabel Owen; the couple had twin daughters and a son. He served as mayor of Owen Sound from 1920, when the town became a city, until 1921.

Patterson was first elected to the Ontario legislative assembly as a Liberal-Progressive in a 1934 by-election held after David James Taylor was named Deputy Minister of Game and Fisheries; he was reelected as a Liberal in 1943.
