= Eddie Sargent =

Canadian politician

Ontario MPP
- In office 1967–1987
- Preceded by: New riding
- Succeeded by: Riding abolished
- Constituency: Grey-Bruce
- In office 1963–1967
- Preceded by: Mac Phillips
- Succeeded by: Riding abolished
- Constituency: Grey North

Mayor of Owen Sound, Ontario
- In office 1948–1963

Personal details
- Born: April 11, 1915 Port Dover, Ontario
- Died: January 28, 1998 (aged 82) Owen Sound, Ontario
- Party: Liberal
- Spouse: Roma McLean (1940-1981)
- Children: 3
- Profession: Businessman

Edward Carson Sargent (April 11, 1915 – January 28, 1998) was a politician in Ontario, Canada. He was a Liberal member of the Legislative Assembly of Ontario from 1963 to 1987 who represented the central Ontario ridings of Grey North and Grey-Bruce.

== Background ==
Sargent was born in Port Dover, and educated in Owen Sound. He was a publisher and sales executive, serving as president of Owen Sound Herald Press Ltd., Sargent Reality Co. Ltd. and Eddie Sargent Promotions Ltd. He married Roma McLean in 1940 and together they raised three daughters. His wife died of cancer in 1981.

== Politics ==
He campaigned for the Ontario legislature in the 1948 provincial election, and lost to Progressive Conservative Mac Phillips by 383 votes in Grey North. He became mayor of Owen Sound in the same year, and held this position until 1963. In 1951, he served as president of the Ontario Mayors and Reeves Association.

Sargent campaigned for the legislature a second time in the 1955 provincial election, and again lost to Phillips. He also campaigned for the House of Commons of Canada as a Liberal candidate in the 1957 federal election, and lost in Grey North to Progressive Conservative candidate Percy Verner Noble.

Mac Phillips did not contest the 1963 provincial election, and Sargent was elected over new Progressive Conservative candidate William Forsyth by 31 votes. He campaigned for the party's leadership in 1964, and finished sixth out of seven candidates. The winner was Andrew Thompson, later a Canadian Senator. Sargent was re-elected in the elections of 1967, 1971, 1975, 1977, 1981 and 1985 in the riding of Grey-Bruce.

Following the 1985 election, the Liberal Party ended forty-two years of Progressive Conservative rule in Ontario by forming a minority government with outside support from the New Democratic Party. After serving on the opposition benches for twenty-two years, Sargent was able to end his career on the government side. He served as parliamentary assistant to the Minister of Tourism and Recreation, and did not seek re-election in 1987.

== Later life ==
In recognition of his public service, a 29 km. road in Owen Sound was renamed the Eddie Sargent Parkway. Sargent was married to Roma McLean (1918–1981) and he is buried in the Greenwood Cemetery, Owen Sound, Ontario. His daughter, Patti Belle Sargent wrote a book detailing the life and exploits of Eddie Sargent entitled "Roses in December: A Biography of Eddie Sargent".
