= Maurice Bélanger =

Canadian politician (1912–1964)

Ontario MPP
- In office 1959–1964
- Preceded by: William Griesinger
- Succeeded by: Ivan Thrasher
- Constituency: Windsor—Sandwich

Personal details
- Born: July 12, 1912; Sherbrooke, Quebec
- Died: March 24, 1964 (aged 51); Windsor, Ontario
- Political party: Liberal
- Occupation: Teacher

Maurice Lucien Bélanger (July 12, 1912 – March 24, 1964) was a politician in Ontario, Canada. He was a Liberal member of the Legislative Assembly of Ontario from 1959 to 1964 who represented the southwestern riding of Windsor—Sandwich.

== Background ==
Bélanger was born in Sherbrooke, Quebec, grew up in Windsor, Ontario, and went to Ottawa Normal School.

== Politics ==
Bélanger was elected in the general election in 1959 winning in Windsor—Sandwich, a riding which had been held for fifteen years by William Griesinger who had been discredited in a financial scandal in 1958. Bélanger was re-elected in the general elections in 1963. During his first term in office, he served on as many as eight Standing Committees, simultaneously. He died in office on March 24, 1964, and, in the subsequent by-election, the riding was re-taken by the PCs.

A community park in the west end of Windsor, Ontario, was named in his honour in recognition of his public service.
