= David James Taylor =

Canadian politician

Ontario MPP
- In office 1919–1934
- Preceded by: Colin Stewart Cameron
- Succeeded by: Roland Patterson
- Constituency: Grey North

Personal details
- Born: 1889 Keppel Township, Ontario
- Died: January 9, 1968 (aged 78)
- Party: Liberal-UFO, 1919-1923; United Farmers, 1923-1926; Progressive, 1926-1929; Liberal-Progressive, 1929-1934
- Occupation: Farmer

David James Taylor (1889 – January 9, 1968) was an Ontario farmer and political figure. He represented Grey North in the Legislative Assembly of Ontario from 1919 to 1934 as a Liberal-United Farmers, United Farmers, Progressive and finally Liberal-Progressive member.

He was born in Keppel Township, Ontario, the son of George Taylor, and was educated in Wiarton. He returned to take over the operation of the family farm. He resigned his seat in 1934 to accept an appointment as Deputy Minister of Game and Fisheries.
