= Hugh Peacock =

Canadian politician

Ontario MPP
- In office 1967–1971
- Preceded by: New riding
- Succeeded by: Ted Bounsall
- Constituency: Windsor West

Personal details
- Born: 1938 (age 87–88)
- Party: New Democrat
- Occupation: Researcher

Hugh Peacock (born c. 1938) is a former politician in Ontario, Canada. He was an NDP member of the Legislative Assembly of Ontario from 1967 to 1971. He represented the riding of Windsor West. He served under the leadership of Stephen Lewis.

== Background ==
Peacock was the Woodworkers' Education and Research Representative from 1960 to 1961. He served as a researcher for the UAW from 1962 to 1967.

== Politics ==
He ran for office in 1965 for Member of Parliament in the riding of Essex West. He was defeated by Herb Gray, and came in third with 5,739 votes.

He was elected to the Ontario Legislature in 1967. He did not stand for re-election in 1971 and was replaced by Ted Bounsall, also a New Democrat.

== Later life ==
Peacock was a negotiator for the Toronto Newspaper Guild from 1972-1976. He also served on the Ontario Labour Relations Board representing labour and the Ontario Federation of Labour.
