= Windsor West (provincial electoral district) =

Provincial electoral district in Ontario, Canada

Coordinates: 42.29°N 83.05°W

Ontario electoral district
- Location in Windsor

Provincial electoral district
- Legislature: Legislative Assembly of Ontario
MPP
Lisa Gretzky
New Democratic
- District created: 1996
- First contested: 1999
- Last contested: 2025

Demographics
- Population (2016): 122,990
- Electors (2018): 90,698
- Area (km²): 83
- Pop. density (per km²): 1,481.8
- Census division: Essex
- Census subdivision: Windsor

Windsor West (French: Windsor-Ouest) is a provincial electoral district in Ontario, Canada, represented in the Legislative Assembly of Ontario from 1967 to 1975 since 1999. The district consists of the part of the city of Windsor lying west and south of a line drawn from the U.S. border southeast along Langlois Avenue, east along Tecumseh Road East, and southeast along Pillette Road to the southern city limit.

== Demographics ==
Average family income: $66,432 (2001)
Median household income: $44,939
Unemployment: 9.2%
Language, mother tongue: English 66%, French 3%, other 31%
Religion: Catholic 46%, Protestant 24%, Muslim 6%, Orthodox Christian 4%, other Christian 4%, Buddhist 1%, no religious affiliation 13%, other 2%
Visible minority: Black 4%, Arab 4%, Chinese 4%, South Asian 3%, Southeast Asian 2%, Latin American 1%, Filipino 1%, others 1%

== History ==
Windsor West as a provincial electoral district was created for the 1926 Ontario general election when the Windsor district was divided into Windsor West and Windsor East. It existed from 1967 to 1975. It was represented by Hugh Peacock and Dr. Ted Bounsall, both New Democrats.

In 1996, Premier Mike Harris and the Progressive Conservative government introduced legislation that changed provincial riding boundaries to match federal riding boundaries. This created the new provincial riding of Windsor West. It included parts of Windsor—Sandwich and Windsor—Walkerville.

== Members of Provincial Parliament ==
This riding has elected the following members of Provincial Parliament:

Windsor West
Assembly	Years	Member	Party
17th	1926–1929	John Frederick Reid	Conservative
18th	1929–1934	John Frederick Reid	Conservative
Riding re-created
28th	1967–1971	Hugh Peacock	New Democratic
29th	1971–1975	Ted Bounsall	New Democratic
Riding dissolved
Riding created from Windsor—Sandwich and Windsor—Walkerville
37th	1999–2003	Sandra Pupatello	Liberal
38th	2003–2007	Sandra Pupatello	Liberal
39th	2007–2011	Sandra Pupatello	Liberal
40th	2011–2014	Teresa Piruzza	Liberal
41st	2014–2018	Lisa Gretzky	New Democratic
42nd	2018–2022	Lisa Gretzky	New Democratic
43rd	2022–2025	Lisa Gretzky	New Democratic
44th	2025–present	Lisa Gretzky	New Democratic

== Election results ==
Winning party in each polling division of Windsor West at the 2025 Ontario general election

2025 Ontario general election
Party	Candidate	Votes	%	±%	Expenditures
New Democratic	Lisa Gretzky	19,392	52.12	+9.93	$77,661
Progressive Conservative	Tony Francis	14,665	39.42	+4.11	$99,190
Ontario Party	Matthew Giancola	1,019	2.74	–1.91	$1,719
Green	Nick Kolasky	868	2.33	–0.44	$1,412
None of the Above	Mark Dewdney	740	1.98	N/A	$0
New Blue	Joshua Griffin	520	1.40	–0.58	$0
Total valid votes/expense limit		37,204	99.01	-0.09	$156,273
Total rejected, unmarked, and declined ballots		371	0.99	+0.09	
Turnout		37,575	38.81	+5.19	
Eligible voters		96,825			
New Democratic hold		Swing		+2.9	
Source: Elections Ontario

Winning party in each polling division of Windsor West at the 2022 Ontario general election

2022 Ontario general election
Party	Candidate	Votes	%	±%	Expenditures
New Democratic	Lisa Gretzky	13,395	42.19	−9.94	$78,770
Progressive Conservative	John Leontowicz	11,211	35.31	+6.84	$49,964
Liberal	Linda L. McCurdy	4,159	13.10	−1.61	$15,222
Ontario Party	Jeremy Palko	1,478	4.65		$14,028
Green	Krysta Glovasky-Ridsdale	879	2.77	−0.81	$381
New Blue	Joshua Griffin	630	1.98		$793
Total valid votes/expense limit		31,752	99.10	+0.06	$133,413
Total rejected, unmarked, and declined ballots		287	0.90	-0.06	
Turnout		32,039	33.62	-9.68	
Eligible voters		94,977			
New Democratic hold		Swing		−8.39	
Source(s): "Summary of Valid Votes Cast for Each Candidate" (PDF). Elections Ontario. 2022. Archived from the original on May 18, 2023.; "Statistical Summary by Electoral District" (PDF). Elections Ontario. 2022. Archived from the original on May 21, 2023.

2018 Ontario general election
Party	Candidate	Votes	%	±%
New Democratic	Lisa Gretzky	20,276	52.12	+10.85
Progressive Conservative	Adam Ibrahim	11,073	28.47	+14.00
Liberal	Rino Bortolin	5,722	14.71	-23.75
Green	Krysta Glovasky-Ridsdale	1,393	3.58	+0.25
None of the Above	Chad Durocher	435	1.12	
Total valid votes		38,899	99.04	+0.45
Total rejected, unmarked and declined ballots		376	0.96	-0.45
Turnout		39,275	43.30	+0.59
Eligible voters		90,698		
New Democratic hold		Swing		
Source: Elections Ontario

2014 Ontario general election
Party	Candidate	Votes	%	±%
New Democratic	Lisa Gretzky	15,043	41.41	+10.44
Liberal	Teresa Piruzza	14,001	38.54	-2.85
Progressive Conservative	Henry Lau	5,225	14.38	-10.32
Green	Chad Durocher	1,171	3.22	+0.26
Independent	Helmi Charif	891	2.45	-28.36
Total valid votes		36,331	98.59	-0.79
Total rejected, unmarked and declined ballots		518	1.41	+0.79
Turnout		36,849	42.71	+1.14
Eligible voters		86,285		
New Democratic gain from Liberal		Swing		+6.65
Source: Elections Ontario

2011 Ontario general election
Party	Candidate	Votes	%	±%
Liberal	Teresa Piruzza	14,127	41.31	-8.88
New Democratic	Helmi Charif	10,544	30.83	+5.16
Progressive Conservative	Todd Branch	8,476	24.79	+7.92
Green	Chad Durocher	1,051	3.07	-2.82
Total valid votes		34,198	99.38	
Total rejected, unmarked and declined ballots		213	0.62	
Turnout		34,411	41.57	
Eligible voters		82,773		
Liberal hold		Swing		-7.02
Source: Elections Ontario

2007 Ontario general election
Party	Candidate	Votes	%	±%
Liberal	Sandra Pupatello	16,821	50.19	-11.51
New Democratic	Mariano Klimowicz	8,604	25.67	+4.35
Progressive Conservative	Lisa Lumley	5,652	16.86	+5.26
Green	Jason Richard Haney	1,974	5.89	*
Family Coalition	Daniel Joseph Dionne	463	1.38	
Total valid votes		33,514	100.00	
Liberal hold		Swing	-7.93	

^ Change is from redistributed result

2003 Ontario general election
Party	Candidate	Votes	%	±%
Liberal	Sandra Pupatello	21,993	62.52	-2.98
New Democratic	Yvette Blackburn	7,383	20.98	+5.50
Progressive Conservative	Derek Insley	4,187	11.90	-4.83
Green	Cary M. Lucier	1,233	3.50	+2.37
Independent	Enver Villamizar	386	1.10	
Total valid votes		35,182	100.00	

1999 Ontario general election
Party	Candidate	Votes	%
Liberal	Sandra Pupatello	24,388	65.50
Progressive Conservative	David McCamon	6,229	16.73
New Democratic	Liam McCarthy	5,762	15.48
Green	Timothy Dugdale	420	1.13
Independent	Robert Cruise	270	0.73
Libertarian	Lynn Tobin	162	0.44
Total valid votes		37,231	100.00

== 2007 electoral reform referendum ==
2007 Ontario electoral reform referendum
Side	Votes	%
First Past the Post	20,338	62.9
Mixed member proportional	12,015	37.1
Total valid votes	32,353	100.0

== See also ==
- List of Ontario provincial electoral districts
- Canadian provincial electoral districts
