= Results of the 1977 Ontario general election by riding =

- June 9, 1981

The following are the results by riding (electoral district) of the 1977 Ontario general election, that was held on June 9, 1977.

== Riding results ==
Electoral district	Candidates				Incumbent
Electoral district	PC	Liberal	NDP	Other	Incumbent
Algoma	Dave Liddle; 5,751 (40.49%)	Gabriel Tremblay; 1,534 (10.80%)	Bud Wildman; 6,917 (48.70%)		Bud Wildman
Algoma—Manitoulin	John Lane; 7,381 (56.64%)	Don Prescott; 3,486 (26.75%)	Tasso Christie; 2,165 (16.61%)		John Lane
Armourdale	Bruce McCaffrey; 14,082 (42.67%)	Des Newman; 11,649 (35.29%)	Marlene Koehler; 6,736 (20.41%)	Bruce Evoy (Lbt); 280 (0.85%); David Wraggett (Ind); 258 (0.78%)	Philip Givens
Beaches—Woodbine	Tom Wardle; 9,217 (37.31%)	Ernest Barr; 3,579 (14.49%)	Marion Bryden; 11,491 (46.51%)	George Leslie (Ind); 203 (0.81%); Gerry Van Houten (Comm); 114 (0.46%); Shirley Yamada (Lbt); 103 (0.41%)	Marion Bryden
Bellwoods	Maria Sgro; 2,925 (22.62%)	Millie Caccia; 3,332 (25.77%)	Ross McClellan; 6,177 (47.76%)	Scarth Heap (Comm); 194 (1.50%); Grace-Ann Paulson (Lbt); 152 (1.17%); Ronald Rodgers (Ind); 151 (1.17%)	Ross McClellan
Brampton	Bill Davis; 19,641 (51.92%)	Bob Callahan; 7,948 (21.01%)	John Deamer; 9,897 (26.16%)	John MacLennan (Comm); 216 (0.57%); Therese Faubert (LSA); 86 (0.23%); Fred Haight (NALP); 44 (0.12%)	Bill Davis
Brantford	Phil Gillies; 9,081 (31.77%)	Arne Zabell; 6,130 (21.44%)	Mac Makarchuk; 13,376 (46.79%)		Mac Makarchuk
Brant—Oxford—Haldimand	Clare Huffman; 5,812 (23.41%)	Robert Nixon; 14,256 (57.42%)	Jim Schneider; 4,760 (19.17%)		Robert Nixon
Brock	Bob Welch; 11,944 (51.77%)	Marv Edwards; 5,910 (25.62%)	Robert Hoover; 5,215 (22.61%)		Bob Welch
Burlington South	George Kerr; 18,892 (51.06%)	John O'Boyle; 10,474 (28.31%)	Bill Brown; 7,015 (18.96%)	John Lawson (Lbt); 615 (1.66%)	George Kerr
Cambridge	Bill Barlow; 10,566 (35.45%)	Claudette Millar; 7,870 (26.40%)	Monty Davidson; 11,120 (37.31%)	John Long (Ind SC); 252 (0.85%)	Monty Davidson
Carleton	Sid Handleman; 14,847 (46.51%)	Eileen Consiglio; 10,241 (32.08%)	Judy Wasylycia-Leis; 6,837 (21.41%)		Sid Handleman
Carleton East	Darwin Kealey; 12,052 (32.91%)	Ed Ryan; 11,837 (32.32%)	Evelyn Gigantes; 12,733 (34.77%)		Evelyn Gigantes
Carleton-Grenville	Norm Sterling; 14,002 (59.61%)	Paul Raina; 5,493 (23.38%)	Jack McLachlen; 3,995 (17.01%)		Donald Irvine
Chatham—Kent	Darcy McKeough; 10,769 (46.48%)	Darrell Gall; 5,919 (25.55%)	Ron Franko; 6,482 (27.96%)		Darcy McKeough
Cochrane North	René Brunelle; 10,412 (61.44%)	Frank Levay; 2,488 (14.68%)	Robert Fortin; 4,047 (23.88%)		René Brunelle
Cochrane South	Alan Pope; 12,533 (51.26%)	Kenneth Matthews; 1,442 (5.90%)	Bill Ferrier; 10,256 (41.95%)	Clem Larochelle (Ind); 219 (0.89%)	Bill Ferrier
Cornwall	James Kirkey; 9,492 (43.84%)	Allan Burn; 2,089 (9.65%)	George Samis; 9,978 (46.08%)	James Rideout (Ind); 94 (0.43%)	George Samis
Don Mills	Dennis Timbrell; 17,005 (55.20%)	Andrew Meles; 4,906 (15.92%)	Steve Thomas; 8,125 (26.37%)	Michael Martin (Lbt); 772 (2.51%)	Dennis Timbrell
Dovercourt	George Nixon; 4,183 (27.52%)	A. David MacDonald; 3,162 (20.81%)	Tony Lupusella; 7,340 (48.30%)	William Stewart (Comm); 380 (2.50%); Maureen Cain (Lbt); 133 (0.87%)	Tony Lupusella
Downsview	Sam Stabile; 6,152 (27.22%)	Joe DeAngelis; 5,814 (25.72%)	Odoardo Di Santo; 10,194 (45.10%)	Michael Little (Lbt); 251 (1.11%); Doreen Leitch (NALP); 193 (0.85%)	Odoardo Di Santo
Dufferin—Simcoe	George McCague; 15,528 (48.81%)	James Wales; 9,480 (29.80%)	Bill Fox; 6,369 (20.02%)	Reg Gervais (SC); 438 (1.38%)	George McCague
Durham East	Sam Cureatz; 12,862 (41.66%)	Joan Downey; 5,121 (16.58%)	Doug Moffatt; 12,740 (41.26%)	Lloyd Leitch (NALP); 153 (0.50%)	Doug Moffatt
Durham West	George Ashe; 12,688 (41.30%)	Joe Bugelli; 5,075 (16.52%)	Charles Godfrey; 12,095 (39.37%)	Bill Leslie (Ind); 865 (2.81%)	Charles Godfrey
Durham—York	Bill Newman; 14,134 (51.44%)	Liz Catty; 6,345 (23.09%)	Allan McPhail; 7,000 (25.47%)		Bill Newman
Eglinton	Roy McMurtry; 19,213 (59.60%)	Sean McCann; 7,471 (23.17%)	Eileen Elmy; 4,857 (15.07%)	Linda Cain (Lbt); 382 (1.18%); John Stifel (Ind); 315 (0.98%)	Roy McMurtry
Elgin	Ron McNeil; 12,655 (47.48%)	Dave Cook; 9,174 (34.42%)	Colin Swan; 4,654 (17.46%)	William Triska (Ind); 172 (0.64%)	Ron McNeil
Erie	Greg Parker; 5,833 (58.39%)	Ray Haggerty; 10,008 (48.71%)	Barrie MacLeod; 4,704 (22.90%)		Ray Haggerty
Essex North	Marcel Desjardins; 4,383 (22.89%)	Dick Ruston; 9,801 (51.19%)	Dave Bradley; 4,964 (25.92%)		Dick Ruston
Essex South	Frank Klees; 7,991 (32.56%)	Remo Mancini; 11,215 (45.69%)	Dan Lauzon; 5,340 (21.75%)		Remo Mancini
Etobicoke	Rosalyn McKenna; 6,789 (26.83%)	Ben Bellantone; 6,363 (25.14%)	Ed Philip; 11,637 (45.99%)	Richard Bostler (Lbt); 517 (2.04%)	Ed Philip
Fort William	Mickey Hennessy; 12,230 (46.28%)	Dick O'Donnell; 4,080 (15.44%)	Iain Angus; 9,974 (37.74%)	Clifford Wahl (Comm); 142 (0.54%)	Iain Angus
Frontenac—Addington	Winston Cousins; 9,777 (40.82%)	J. Earl McEwen; 10,582 (44.18%)	Bill Barnes; 3,280 (13.69%)	Ross Baker (Ind); 315 (1.32%)	J. Earl McEwen
Grey	Fred Taylor; 7,589 (28.69%)	Bob McKessock; 14,651 (55.39%)	Walter Miller; 4,210 (15.92%)		Bob McKessock
Grey-Bruce	Harvey Davis; 9,425 (35.26%)	Eddie Sargent; 14,828 (55.47%)	Bill Proud; 2,477 (9.27%)		Eddie Sargent
Haldimand-Norfolk	Gordon McNern; 11,632 (37.06%)	Gordon Miller; 15,496 (49.37%)	Norm Walpole; 4,257 (13.56%)		Gordon Miller
Halton—Burlington	George Gray; 10,287 (34.44%)	Julian Reed; 13,985 (46.82%)	Bill Johnson; 5,598 (18.74%)		Julian Reed
Hamilton Centre	Bill McCulloch; 5,092 (23.47%)	Sheila Copps Miller; 8,202 (37.80%)	Mike Davison; 8,216 (37.86%)	Art Walling (Comm); 189 (0.87%)	Mike Davison
Hamilton East	Fred Campbell; 6,605 (21.51%)	Olga Varga; 9,266 (30.17%)	Robert W. Mackenzie; 14,461 (47.09%)	Bob Jaggard (Comm); 376 (1.22%)	Robert W. Mackenzie
Hamilton Mountain	John Smith; 12,308 (37.13%)	Kris Channan; 7,910 (23.86%)	Brian Charlton; 12,681 (38.26%)	Mike Mirza (Comm); 247 (0.75%)	John Smith
Hamilton West	Maurice Carter; 8,379 (29.47%)	Stuart Smith; 12,239 (43.05%)	Marjorie Baskin; 7,668 (26.97%)	Lucylle Boikoff (NALP); 144 (0.51%)	Stuart Smith
Hastings-Peterborough	Clarke Rollins; 11,442 (47.22%)	Dave Hobson; 9,584 (39.55%)	Elmer Buchanan; 2,808 (11.59%)	Bill Hawthorne Jr. 247 (1.02%); Gary Beamish; 149 (0.61%)	Clarke Rollins
High Park—Swansea	Bill Boytchuk; 9,630 (37.80%)	Ted Ives; 4,897 (19.22%)	Ed Ziemba; 10,409 (40.86%)	Robert McKay (Lbt); 360 (1.41%); Christian Negre (Comm); 177 (0.69%)	Ed Ziemba
Humber	John MacBeth; 19,888 (50.95%)	John Dods; 10,572 (27.08%)	Bob Curran; 7,781 (19.93%)	Sheldon Gold (Lbt); 399 (1.02%); Kris Hansen; 394 (1.01%)	John MacBeth
Huron-Bruce	Sam MacGregor; 7,523 (28.25%)	Murray Gaunt; 17,356 (65.17%)	David Zyluk; 1,754 (6.59%)		Murray Gaunt
Huron—Middlesex	Anson McKinley; 8,878 (38.55%)	Jack Riddell; 12,749 (55.35%)	Shirley Weary; 1,405 (6.10%)		Jack Riddell
Kenora	Leo Bernier; 10,882 (57.14%)	Rupert Ross (Liberal-Labour); 2,907 (15.26%)	Bill Watkins; 5,256 (27.60%)		Leo Bernier
Kent—Elgin	Don Luckham; 9,397 (42.80%)	Jim McGuigan; 10,038 (45.72%)	Ed Cutler; 2,521 (11.48%)		Jack Spence
Kingston and the Islands	Keith Norton; 12,246 (52.32%)	Peter Watson; 6,490 (27.73%)	John Clements; 4,510 (19.27%)	Louise Andrews (Comm); 158 (0.68%)	Keith Norton
Kitchener	Sid McLennan; 6,910 (24.94%)	Jim Breithaupt; 14,425 (52.06%)	Cam Conrad; 6,264 (22.61%)	Evelina Pan (Comm); 111 (0.40%)	Jim Breithaupt
Kitchener—Wilmot	Curtis Roth; 6,470 (26.54%)	John Sweeney; 12,450 (51.07%)	Jo Surich; 5,456 (22.38%)		John Sweeney
Lake Nipigon	Al Charr; 2,417 (20.91%)	John Lentowicz Miller; 1,397 (12.08%)	Jack Stokes; 7,747 (67.01%)		Jack Stokes
Lambton	Lorne Henderson; 11,604 (52.63%)	Fred McCormick; 8,741 (39.65%)	Cliff Swanstrom; 1,702 (7.72%)		Lorne Henderson
Lanark	Douglas Wiseman; 11,086 (55.42%)	Craig Steenburgh; 3,919 (19.59%)	Bev Greenslade; 4,997 (24.98%)		Douglas Wiseman
Lakeshore	Al Kolyn; 6,683 (26.12%)	Carl Weinsheimer; 4,815 (18.82%)	Pat Lawlor; 13,345 (52.16%)	Gordon Flowers (Comm); 740 (2.89%)	Pat Lawlor
Leeds	James Auld; 14,853 (67.65%)	John Carley; 3,702 (16.86%)	Jim Morrison; 3,400 (15.49%)		James Auld
Lincoln	Ron Southward; 9,387 (42.36%)	Ross Hall; 9,969 (44.98%)	Barbara Mersereau; 2,806 (12.66%)		Ross Hall
London Centre	Frank Ross; 8,915 (31.61%)	David Peterson; 12,808 (45.42%)	Stu Ross; 6,279 (22.26%)	Agnes Shaw (Ind); 200 (0.71%)	David Peterson
London North	Marvin Shore; 10,631 (33.23%)	Ron Van Horne; 15,033 (46.99%)	David Cunningham; 6,130 (19.16%)	Greg Utas (Lbt); 201 (0.63%)	Marvin Shore
London South	Gordon Walker; 16,011 (42.38%)	John Ferris; 13,800 (36.53%)	Tom Olien; 7,964 (21.08%)		John Ferris
Middlesex	Robert G. Eaton; 10,247 (42.46%)	Don Nisbet; 8,889 (36.83%)	Gordon Hill; 4,998 (20.71%)		Robert G Eaton
Mississauga East	Bud Gregory; 11,945 (45.25%)	Irene Robinson; 8,456 (32.04%)	Neil Davis; 5,994 (22.71%)		Bud Gregory
Mississauga North	Terry Jones; 16,151 (46.56%)	Al LaRochelle; 5,684 (16.39%)	David Busby; 12,401 (35.75%)	Betty Cerar (Lbt); 380 (1.10%); Anna Sideris (Comm); 71 (0.20%)	Terry Jones
Mississauga South	Douglas Kennedy; 13,622 (47.91%)	Mike Garvey; 7,616 (26.78%)	Ted Humphreys; 7,196 (25.31%)		Douglas Kennedy
Muskoka	Frank Miller; 8,865 (49.23%)	Peggy Fitzpatrick; 2,774 (15.41%)	Ken Cargill; 6,368 (35.36%)		Frank Miller
Niagara Falls	Guy Ungaro; 9,352 (30.58%)	Vincent Kerrio; 13,280 (43.42%)	Peter Sobol; 7,952 (26.00%)		Vince Kerrio
Nickel Belt	Marty McAllister; 3,923 (23.95%)	Paul Adam; 3,046 (18.60%)	Floyd Laughren; 9,410 (57.45%)		Floyd Laughren
Nipissing	Merle Dickerson; 11,232 (37.56%)	Mike Bolan; 12,898 (43.13%)	Dennis Arsenault; 5,777 (19.32%)		Richard Smith
Northumberland	Russell Rowe; 14,061 (48.30%)	Dennis Buckley; 10,334 (35.50%)	John Taylor; 4,716 (16.20%)		Russell Rowe
Oakville	James Snow; 14,456 (50.97%)	Walt Elliot; 7,948 (28.03%)	Doug Black; 5,955 (21.00%)		James Snow
Oakwood	Fergy Brown; 6,379 (30.10%)	Richard Meagher; 5,046 (23.81%)	Tony Grande; 9,214 (43.48%)	Val Bjarnason (Comm); 229 (1.08%); Willis Cummins; 170 (0.80%); Alex Eaglesham (Lbt); 153 (0.72%)	Tony Grande
Oriole	John Williams; 14,194 (44.32%)	Luella Lumley; 9,707 (30.31%)	Fred Birket; 6,737 (21.03%)	Jim McMillan; 929 (2.90%); Paul Miniato (Lbt); 282 (0.88%); Arthur Wright; 180 (0.56%)	John Williams
Oshawa	Jack Snedden; 6,512 (28.35%)	Ivan Wallace; 4,032 (17.55%)	Mike Breaugh; 12,226 (53.23%)	Russell Rak (Comm); 199 (0.87%)	Mike Breaugh
Ottawa Centre	Brian Cameron; 8,223 (32.16%)	Ian Kimmerly; 6,358 (24.87%)	Michael Cassidy; 10,626 (41.56%)	Marvin Glass (Comm); 360 (1.41%)	Michael Cassidy
Ottawa East	Gisele Lalonde; 4,055 (17.24%)	Albert Roy; 15,864 (67.44%)	Robert Choquette; 3,605 (15.32%)		Albert Roy
Ottawa South	Claude Bennett; 16,662 (49.37%)	Patricia Thorpe; 7,754 (22.98%)	Eileen Scotton; 8,759 (25.95%)	Michael Houlton; 574 (1.70%)	Claude Bennett
Ottawa West	Reuben Baetz; 15,279 (45.07%)	Bill Roberts; 9,906 (29.22%)	Marion Dewar; 8,718 (25.71%)		Donald Morrow
Oxford	Harry Parrott; 17,758 (50.98%)	John MacDonald; 12,657 (36.33%)	Mike Casselman; 4,420 (12.69%)		Harry Parrott
Parkdale	Lee Monaco; 4,116 (23.98%)	Stan Mamak; 5,134 (29.91%)	Jan Dukszta; 7,574 (44.12%)	Gareth Blythe (Comm); 343 (2.00%)	Jan Dukszta
Parry Sound	Lorne Maeck; 9,929 (49.66%)	Ed Fisher; 7,510 (37.57%)	Ray Smith; 2,553 (12.77%)		Lorne Maeck
Perth	Vivian Jarvis; 6,056 (22.92%)	Hugh Edighoffer; 18,201 (68.88%)	Carson McLauchlan; 2,167 (8.20%)		Hugh Edighoffer
Peterborough	John Turner; 16,923 (40.66%)	Peter Adams; 10,083 (24.23%)	Gillian Sandeman; 14,275 (34.30%)	John Hayes (Lbt); 341 (0.82%)	Gill Sandeman
Port Arthur	Allan Laakkonen; 9,290 (38.72%)	Juha Siimes; 4,818 (20.08%)	Jim Foulds; 9,629 (40.14%)	Philip Harris (Comm); 254 (1.06%)	Jim Foulds
Prescott and Russell	Joseph Bélanger; 11,863 (48.74%)	Philibert Proulx; 8,877 (36.48%)	Joseph Cheff; 3,597 (14.78%)		Joseph Bélanger
Prince Edward—Lennox	James Taylor; 11,411 (55.22%)	Mary Kaiser; 5,759 (27.87%)	Jan Nicol; 3,494 (16.91%)		James Taylor
Quinte	Don Williams; 10,009 (36.70%)	Hugh O'Neil; 17,264 (63.30%)			Hugh O'Neil
Rainy River	Gordon Thomson; 3,268 (28.12%)	T. Patrick Reid (Liberal-Labour); 5,335 (45.90%)	Howard Hampton; 3,019 (25.98%)		T. Patrick Reid
Renfrew North	Bob Cotnam; 6,817 (32.70%)	Sean Conway; 9,549 (45.80%)	Bob Cox; 4,482 (21.50%)		Sean Conway
Renfrew South	Paul Yakabuski; 12,666 (46.56%)	Dick Trainor; 11,585 (42.59%)	Harry Pattinson; 2,952 (10.85%)		Paul Yakabuski
Riverdale	Nola Sam Crewe; 4,289 (24.83%)	Dennis Drainville; 2,821 (16.33%)	Jim Renwick; 9,639 (55.79%)	Gordon Massie (Comm); 214 (1.24%); Walter Balej (Lbt); 196 (1.13%); Barry Weisleder (Ind/RMG); 117 (0.68%)	Jim Renwick
St. Andrew-St. Patrick	Larry Grossman; 11,621 (49.57%)	Edward Clarke; 3,000 (12.80%)	Barbara Beardsley; 8,452 (36.05%)	Anna Larsen (Comm); 198 (0.84%); Vincent Miller (Lbt); 172 (0.73%)	Larry Grossman
St. Catharines	Eleanor Lancaster; 11,669 (36.62%)	Jim Bradley; 12,392 (38.89%)	Fred Dickson; 7,556 (23.71%)	Eric Blair (Comm); 247 (0.78%)	Robert Mercer Johnston
St. David	Margaret Scrivener; 11,894 (44.14%)	Robert McClelland; 3,794 (14.08%)	Gordon Cressy; 11,058 (41.03%)	Shane Parkhill (Comm); 202 (0.75%)	Margaret Scrivener
St. George	Frank Vasilkioti; 9,807 (35.30%)	Margaret Campbell; 10,289 (37.04%)	Lukin Robinson; 6,171 (22.21%)	D.M. Campbell; 1,083 (3.90%); David T. Anderson (Lbt); 272 (0.98%); Fred Weir (Comm); 159 (0.57%)	Margaret Campbell
Sarnia	Andy Brandt; 11,243 (38.10%)	Paul Blundy; 11,500 (38.97%)	Wallace Krawczyk; 6,770 (22.94%)		Jim Bullbrook
Sault Ste. Marie	John Rhodes; 19,209 (55.28%)	John Nelson; 3,715 (10.69%)	Don Burgess; 11,660 (33.56%)	Arlene Bovingdon (Comm); 162 (0.47%)	John Rhodes
Scarborough Centre	Frank Drea; 11,585 (43.59%)	Charles Beer; 5,263 (19.80%)	Dave Gracey; 8,806 (33.14%)	Robert Schultz (Lbt); 722 (2.72%); Peter Sideris (Comm); 200 (0.75%)	Frank Drea
Scarborough East	Margaret Birch; 14,792 (50.91%)	Ron Myatt; 6,558 (22.57%)	Ann Marie Hill; 7,218 (24.84%)	John White (Lbt); 489 (1.68%)	Margaret Birch
Scarborough-Ellesmere	Spurge Near; 9,676 (35.06%)	Ken Dimson; 6,557 (23.76%)	David Warner; 11,150 (40.40%)	Mathias Blecker (Comm); 213 (0.77%)	David Warner
Scarborough North	Thomas Leonard Wells; 21,250 (50.02%)	Jean Brookes; 10,495 (24.70%)	Frank Lowery; 10,015 (23.57%)	Marilee Haylock (Lbt); 722 (1.70%)	Thomas L Wells
Scarborough West	Kenneth Timney; 6,870 (27.79%)	Bobby Orr; 3,869 (15.65%)	Stephen Lewis; 13,340 (53.96%)	Paul Mollon (Lbt); 476 (1.93%); Richard Sanders (Ind); 167 (0.68%)	Stephen Lewis
Simcoe Centre	George Taylor; 15,876 (44.25%)	Jim Corneau; 9,556 (26.64%)	Paul Wessenger; 10,442 (29.11%)		George Taylor
Simcoe East	Gordon Smith; 13,793 (44.74%)	Elinor Bingham; 6,783 (22.00%)	Roger Pretty; 10,254 (33.26%)		Gordon Smith
Stormont—Dundas—Glengarry	Osie Villeneuve; 10,533 (49.15%)	Johnny Whitteker; 8,111 (37.85%)	Joe O'Neill; 2,788 (13.01%)		Osie Villeneuve
Sudbury	Peter Cosgrove; 8,485 (31.77%)	Gaetan Doucet; 6,778 (25.38%)	Bud Germa; 11,117 (41.62%)	Justin Legault (Comm); 330 (1.24%)	Bud Germa
Sudbury East	Michael Hopkins; 7,001 (24.16%)	Garrett Lacey; 5,984 (20.65%)	Elie Martel; 15,991 (55.19%)		Elie Martel
Timiskaming	Ed Havrot; 9,578 (47.95%)	Dan Casey; 1,481 (7.42%)	Robert Bain; 8,914 (44.63%)		Robert Bain
Victoria-Haliburton	Jim Webster; 10,539 (33.34%)	John Eakins; 15,218 (48.15%)	Fred McLaughlin; 5,851 (18.51%)		John Eakins
Waterloo North	Bob Gramlow; 8,016 (32.88%)	Herb Epp; 13,556 (55.60%)	Mary-Jane Mewhinney; 2,809 (11.52%)		Edward R. Good
Welland-Thorold	Allan Pietz; 10,389 (37.88%)	Keith Cameron; 4,335 (15.81%)	Mel Swart; 12,704 (46.32%)		Mel Swart
Wellington-Dufferin-Peel	Jack Johnson; 14,272 (45.83%)	David Wright; 9,631 (30.93%)	Marion Chambers; 7,235 (23.24%)		Jack Johnson
Wellington South	Doug Auld; 7,667 (23.89%)	Harry Worton; 16,212 (50.52%)	Carl Hamilton; 7,886 (24.57%)	Brian Seymour (Lbt); 163 (0.51%); Eric Blythe (Comm); 162 (0.50%)	Harry Worton
Wentworth	Dave Brown; 5,506 (21.48%)	Dennis Wilson; 4,800 (18.72%)	Ian Deans; 15,332 (59.80%)		Ian Deans
Wentworth North	John Voortman; 8,464 (24.94%)	Eric Cunningham; 18,322 (53.98%)	Dennis Young; 7,157 (21.09%)		Eric Cunningham
Wilson Heights	David Rotenberg; 11,430 (41.97%)	Murray Markin; 7,195 (26.42%)	Howard Moscoe; 8,437 (30.98%)	Webster J Webb (Lbt); 174 (0.64%)	David Rotenberg
Windsor-Riverside	Al Santing; 4,878 (17.18%)	Michael MacDougall; 10,572 (37.23%)	Dave Cooke; 12,947 (45.59%)		Dave Cooke
Windsor-Sandwich	Randy Atkins; 2,838 (15.01%)	Carman McClelland; 6,024 (31.86%)	Ted Bounsall; 9,711 (51.36%)	Mike Longmoore (Comm); 334 (1.77%)	Ted Bounsall
Windsor-Walkerville	Ron Moro; 4,842 (22.88%)	Bernard Newman; 11,233 (53.09%)	Len Wallace; 4,565 (21.57%)	Allan MacDonald (Dem); 233 (1.10%); Nicola Veronico (Comm); 124 (0.59%); Joe Crouchman; 103 (0.49%); Diane Donison; 59 (0.28%)	Bernard Newman
York Centre	Bill Corcoran; 15,768 (39.76%)	Alfred Stong; 17,608 (44.41%)	Chris Olsen; 6,277 (15.83%)		Alfred Stong
York East	Robert Elgie; 14,131 (46.72%)	Mike Kenny; 7,126 (23.56%)	Lois Cox; 8,334 (27.55%)	Chris Greenland (Ind SC); 265 (0.88%); Maura O'Neill (Comm); 245 (0.81%); Paul Wakfer (Lbt); 144 (0.48%)	Robert Elgie
York Mills	Bette Stephenson; 21,656 (58.32%)	Wilfred Caplan; 9,614 (25.89%)	Allan Millard; 5,071 (13.66%)	Donald Gordon; 465 (1.25%); Scott Bell (Lbt); 368 (0.99%)	Bette Stephenson
York North	Bill Hodgson; 15,639 (48.05%)	Jim Wilson; 9,660 (29.68%)	Ian Scott; 7,247 (22.27%)		Bill Hodgson
York South	Austin Clarke; 7,666 (27.34%)	Michael Kolle; 5,332 (19.02%)	Donald C. MacDonald; 14,178 (50.56%)	Mike Phillips (Comm); 526 (1.88%); Ken Kortentayer (Lbt); 338 (1.21%)	Donald C. MacDonald
York West	Nick Leluk; 16,538 (46.25%)	Pete Farrow; 10,450 (29.22%)	Ian Barrett; 8,510 (23.80%)	Ronald Vaughan (LbT); 260 (0.73%)	Nick Leluk
Yorkview	George Gemmell; 4,105 (15.50%)	Paul Uguccioni; 6,503 (24.55%)	Fred Young; 14,426 (54.46%)	Dorlene Hewitt; 488 (1.84%); Hersh Gelman (Lbt); 487 (1.84%); Roberto Moretton (Comm); 359 (1.36%); Helen Obadia (Ind NALP); 120 (0.45%)	Fred Young
