= 30th Parliament of Ontario =

Parliamentary session of the Ontario Provincial Parliament

- Minority parliament
- Sep. 18, 1975 – Apr. 29, 1977

Parliament leaders
- Premier: Bill Davis
- Cabinet: 30th
- Leader of the Opposition: Robert Nixon

Party caucuses
- Government: Progressive Conservative Party
- Opposition: Liberal Party
- Recognized: New Democratic Party

Legislative Assembly
- Speaker of the Assembly: Russell Rowe

Sovereign
- Monarch: Elizabeth II; 6 February 1952 – present
| ← 29th | → 31st |

The 30th Legislative Assembly of Ontario was in session from September 18, 1975, until April 29, 1977, just prior to the 1977 general election. The Ontario Progressive Conservative Party led by Bill Davis formed a minority government.

Russell Daniel Rowe served as speaker for the assembly.

== Members ==
| Riding | Member | Party | First elected / previously elected | No. of terms | Notes |
|---|---|---|---|---|---|
| Algoma | Charles Jackson Wildman | New Democratic Party | 1975 | 1st term | |
| Algoma—Manitoulin | John Gordon Lane | Progressive Conservative | 1971 | 2nd term | |
| Armourdale | Philip Gerard Givens | Liberal | 1971 | 2nd term | |
| Beaches—Woodbine | Marion Helen Bryden | New Democratic Party | 1975 | 1st term | |
| Bellwoods | Ross A. McClellan | New Democratic Party | 1975 | 1st term | |
| Brampton | William Grenville Davis | Progressive Conservative | 1959 | 5th term | Premier |
| Brant—Oxford—Norfolk | Robert Fletcher Nixon | Liberal | 1962 | 5th term | Party Leader |
| Brantford | Mac Makarchuk | New Democratic Party | 1967, 1975 | 2nd term* | |
| Brock | Robert Stanley Welch | Progressive Conservative | 1963 | 4th term | |
| Burlington South | George Albert Kerr | Progressive Conservative | 1963 | 4th term | |
| Cambridge | Montgomery Davidson | New Democratic Party | 1975 | 1st term | |
| Carleton | Sid Handleman | Progressive Conservative | 1971 | 2nd term | |
| Carleton East | Evelyn Adelaide Gigantes | New Democratic Party | 1975 | 1st term | |
| Carleton-Grenville | Donald Roy Irvine | Progressive Conservative | 1971 | 2nd term | |
| Chatham—Kent | William Darcy McKeough | Progressive Conservative | 1963 | 4th term | |
| Cochrane North | René Brunelle | Progressive Conservative | 1958 | 6th term | |
| Cochrane South | Bill Ferrier | New Democratic Party | 1967 | 3rd term | |
| Cornwall | George Samis | New Democratic Party | 1974 | 2nd term | |
| Don Mills | Dennis Roy Timbrell | Progressive Conservative | 1971 | 2nd term | |
| Dovercourt | Antonio Lupusella | New Democratic Party | 1975 | 1st term | |
| Downsview | Odoardo Di Santo | New Democratic Party | 1975 | 1st term | |
| Dufferin—Simcoe | George R. McCague | Progressive Conservative | 1975 | 1st term | |
| Durham East | Douglas Peter Moffatt | New Democratic Party | 1975 | 1st term | |
| Durham North | Bill Newman | Progressive Conservative | 1967 | 3rd term | |
| Durham West | Charles Morris Godfrey | New Democratic Party | 1975 | 1st term | |
| Eglinton | Roland McMurtry | Progressive Conservative | 1975 | 1st term | |
| Elgin | Ronald Keith McNeil | Progressive Conservative | 1958 | 6th term | |
| Erie | Raymond Louis Haggerty | Liberal | 1967 | 3rd term | |
| Essex North | Dick Ruston | Liberal | 1967 | 3rd term | |
| Essex South | Remo J. Mancini | Liberal | 1975 | 1st term | |
| Etobicoke | Ed Thomas Philip | New Democratic Party | 1975 | 1st term | |
| Fort William | Iain Frances Angus | New Democratic Party | 1975 | 1st term | |
| Frontenac—Addington | Joseph Earl McEwen | Liberal | 1975 | 1st term | |
| Grey | Robert Carson McKessock | Liberal | 1975 | 1st term | |
| Grey—Bruce | Edward Carson Sargent | Liberal | 1963 | 4th term | |
| Haldimand—Norfolk | Gordon Irvin Miller | Liberal | 1975 | 1st term | |
| Halton—Burlington | Julian Reed | Liberal | 1975 | 1st term | |
| Hamilton Centre | Michael Norman Davison | New Democratic Party | 1975 | 1st term | |
| Hamilton East | Bob Warren Mackenzie | New Democratic Party | 1975 | 1st term | |
| Hamilton Mountain | John Roxborough Smith | Progressive Conservative | 1967 | 3rd term | |
| Hamilton West | Stuart Lyon Smith | Liberal | 1975 | 1st term | |
| Hastings—Peterborough | Clarke Rollins | Progressive Conservative | 1959 | 5th term | |
| High Park—Swansea | Edward J. Ziemba | New Democratic Party | 1975 | 1st term | |
| Humber | John Palmer MacBeth | Progressive Conservative | 1971 | 2nd term | |
| Huron—Bruce | Murray Gaunt | Liberal | 1962 | 5th term | |
| Huron—Middlesex | John Keith Riddell | Liberal | 1973 | 2nd term | |
| Kenora | Leo Edward Bernier | Progressive Conservative | 1966 | 4th term | |
| Kent—Elgin | John Purvis Spence | Liberal | 1955 | 6th term | |
| Kingston and the Islands | Keith Calder Norton | Progressive Conservative | 1975 | 1st term | |
| Kitchener | James Roos Breithaupt | Liberal | 1967 | 3rd term | |
| Kitchener—Wilmot | John Sweeney | Liberal | 1975 | 1st term | |
| Lake Nipigon | John Edward Stokes | New Democratic Party | 1967 | 3rd term | |
| Lakeshore | Patrick Lawlor | New Democratic Party | 1967 | 3rd term | |
| Lambton | Lorne Charles Henderson | Progressive Conservative | 1963 | 4th term | |
| Lanark | Douglas Jack Wiseman | Progressive Conservative | 1971 | 2nd term | |
| Leeds | James Auld | Progressive Conservative | 1954 | 7th term | |
| Lincoln | Ross Hall | Liberal | 1975 | 1st term | |
| London Centre | David Robertson Peterson | Liberal | 1975 | 1st term | |
| London North | Marvin Leonard Shore | Liberal | 1975 | 1st term | Joined the Progressive Conservative in 1976 |
| London North | Marvin Leonard Shore | Progressive Conservative | 1975 | 1st term | Joined the Progressive Conservative in 1976 |
| London South | John Ferris | Liberal | 1975 | 1st term | |
| Middlesex | Robert Gordon Eaton | Progressive Conservative | 1971 | 2nd term | |
| Mississauga East | Milton Edward Charles Gregory | Progressive Conservative | 1975 | 1st term | |
| Mississauga North | Terry David Jones | Progressive Conservative | 1975 | 1st term | |
| Mississauga South | Robert Douglas Kennedy | Progressive Conservative | 1967 | 3rd term | |
| Muskoka | Frank Stuart Miller | Progressive Conservative | 1971 | 2nd term | |
| Niagara Falls | Vincent George Kerrio | Liberal | 1975 | 1st term | |
| Nickel Belt | Floyd Laughren | New Democratic Party | 1971 | 2nd term | |
| Nipissing | Richard Stanley Smith | Liberal | 1965 | 4th term | |
| Northumberland | Russell Daniel Rowe | Progressive Conservative | 1963 | 4th term | |
| Oakville | James Wilfred Snow | Progressive Conservative | 1967 | 3rd term | |
| Oakwood | Anthony William Grande | New Democratic Party | 1975 | 1st term | |
| Oriole | John Reesor Williams | Progressive Conservative | 1975 | 1st term | |
| Oshawa | Michael James Breaugh | New Democratic Party | 1975 | 1st term | |
| Ottawa Centre | Michael Morris Cassidy | New Democratic Party | 1971 | 2nd term | |
| Ottawa East | Albert J. Roy | Liberal | 1971 | 2nd term | |
| Ottawa South | Claude Frederick Bennett | Progressive Conservative | 1971 | 2nd term | |
| Ottawa West | Donald Hugo Morrow | Progressive Conservative | 1948 | 8th term | |
| Oxford | Harry Craig Parrott | Progressive Conservative | 1971 | 2nd term | |
| Parkdale | Jan Dukszta | New Democratic Party | 1971 | 2nd term | |
| Parry Sound | Lorne Maeck | Progressive Conservative | 1971 | 2nd term | |
| Perth | Hugh Alden Edighoffer | Liberal | 1967 | 3rd term | |
| Peterborough | Gillian Ann Sandeman | New Democratic Party | 1975 | 1st term | |
| Port Arthur | James Francis Foulds | New Democratic Party | 1971 | 2nd term | |
| Prescott and Russell | Joseph Albert Bélanger | Progressive Conservative | 1967 | 3rd term | |
| Prince Edward—Lennox | James A. Taylor | Progressive Conservative | 1971 | 2nd term | |
| Quinte | Hugh Patrick O'Neil | Liberal | 1975 | 1st term | |
| Rainy River | T. Patrick Reid | Liberal-Labour | 1967 | 3rd term | |
| Renfrew North | Sean Conway | Liberal | 1975 | 1st term | |
| Renfrew South | Paul Joseph Yakabuski | Progressive Conservative | 1963 | 4th term | |
| Riverdale | Jim Renwick | New Democratic Party | 1964 | 4th term | |
| Sarnia | James Edward Bullbrook | Liberal | 1967 | 3rd term | |
| Sault Ste. Marie | John Rhodes | Progressive Conservative | 1971 | 2nd term | |
| Scarborough Centre | James Francis Drea | Progressive Conservative | 1971 | 2nd term | |
| Scarborough East | Margaret Birch | Progressive Conservative | 1971 | 2nd term | |
| Scarborough North | Thomas Leonard Wells | Progressive Conservative | 1963 | 4th term | |
| Scarborough West | Stephen Henry Lewis | New Democratic Party | 1963 | 4th term | |
| Scarborough—Ellesmere | David William Warner | New Democratic Party | 1975 | 1st term | |
| Simcoe Centre | David Arthur Evans | Progressive Conservative | 1960 | 5th term | |
| Simcoe East | Gordon Elsworth Smith | Progressive Conservative | 1967 | 3rd term | |
| St. Andrew—St. Patrick | Lawrence Sheldon Grossman | Progressive Conservative | 1975 | 1st term | |
| St. Catharines | Robert Mercer Johnston | Progressive Conservative | 1967 | 3rd term | |
| St. David | Margaret Scrivener | Progressive Conservative | 1971 | 2nd term | |
| St. George | Margaret Campbell | Liberal | 1973 | 2nd term | |
| Stormont—Dundas—Glengarry | Osie Villeneuve | Progressive Conservative | 1948, 1963 | 7th term* | |
| Sudbury | Melville Carlyle Germa | New Democratic Party | 1971 | 2nd term | |
| Sudbury East | Elie Walter Martel | New Democratic Party | 1967 | 3rd term | |
| Timiskaming | Robert Bain | New Democratic Party | 1975 | 1st term | |
| Victoria—Haliburton | John F. Eakins | Liberal | 1975 | 1st term | |
| Waterloo North | Edward R. Good | Liberal | 1967 | 3rd term | |
| Welland | Mel Swart | New Democratic Party | 1975 | 1st term | |
| Wellington South | Harry A. Worton | Liberal | 1955 | 6th term | |
| Wellington—Dufferin—Peel | John McLellan Johnson | Progressive Conservative | 1975 | 1st term | |
| Wentworth | Ian Deans | New Democratic Party | 1967 | 3rd term | |
| Wentworth North | Eric Gordon Cunningham | Liberal | 1975 | 1st term | |
| Wilson Heights | Vernon Milton Singer | Liberal | 1959 | 5th term | |
| Windsor—Riverside | Fred Burr | New Democratic Party | 1967 | 3rd term | |
| Windsor—Sandwich | Edwin James Bounsall | New Democratic Party | 1971 | 2nd term | |
| Windsor—Walkerville | Bernard Newman | Liberal | 1959 | 5th term | |
| York Centre | Alfred Joseph Stong | Liberal | 1975 | 1st term | |
| York East | Arthur Meen | Progressive Conservative | 1967 | 3rd term | |
| York Mills | Bette Stephenson | Progressive Conservative | 1975 | 1st term | |
| York North | William Marshall Chamberlain Hodgson | Progressive Conservative | 1967 | 3rd term | |
| York South | Donald Cameron MacDonald | New Democratic Party | 1955 | 6th term | |
| York West | Nicholas Georges Leluk | Progressive Conservative | 1971 | 2nd term | |
| Yorkview | Fred Matthews Young | New Democratic Party | 1963 | 4th term | |
