= 28th Parliament of Ontario =

The 28th Legislative Assembly of Ontario was in session from October 17, 1967, until September 13, 1971, just prior to the 1971 general election. The majority party was the Ontario Progressive Conservative Party led by John Robarts.

Bill Davis succeeded Robarts as party leader and Premier in March 1971. Frederick McIntosh Cass served as speaker for the assembly.

== Members elected to the Assembly ==
Riding	Member	Party	First elected / previously elected	No. of terms	Notes
Algoma	Bernt Gilbertson	Progressive Conservative	1967	1st term	
Algoma—Manitoulin	Stan Farquhar	Liberal	1963	2nd term	
Armourdale	Gordon Carton	Progressive Conservative	1963	2nd term	
Beaches—Woodbine	John L. Brown	New Democratic Party	1967	1st term	
Bellwoods	John Yaremko	Progressive Conservative	1951	5th term	
Brant	Robert Nixon	Liberal	1962	3rd term	
Brantford	Mac Makarchuk	New Democratic Party	1967	1st term	
Carleton	William Erskine Johnston	Progressive Conservative	1955	4th term	
Carleton East	Bert Lawrence	Progressive Conservative	1963	2nd term	
Chatham—Kent	Darcy McKeough	Progressive Conservative	1963	2nd term	
Cochrane North	René Brunelle	Progressive Conservative	1958	4th term	
Cochrane South	Bill Ferrier	New Democratic Party	1967	1st term	
Don Mills	Stan Randall	Progressive Conservative	1963	2nd term	
Dovercourt	Dante Matthew De Monte	Liberal	1967	1st term	
Downsview	Vernon Singer	Liberal	1959	3rd term	
Dufferin—Simcoe	Wally Downer	Progressive Conservative	1937	9th term	
Durham	Hugh Alex Carruthers	Progressive Conservative	1959	3rd term	
Eglinton	Leonard Mackenzie Reilly	Progressive Conservative	1962	3rd term	
Elgin	Ron McNeil	Progressive Conservative	1958	4th term	
Essex South	Donald Alexander Paterson	Liberal	1963	2nd term	
Essex—Kent	Dick Ruston	Liberal	1967	1st term	
Etobicoke	Leonard Braithwaite	Liberal	1963	2nd term	
Fort William	James Hugh Jessiman	Progressive Conservative	1967	1st term	
Frontenac—Addington	John Richard Simonett	Progressive Conservative	1959	3rd term	
Glengarry	Osie Villeneuve	Progressive Conservative	1948, 1963	5th term*	
Grenville—Dundas	Frederick Cass	Progressive Conservative	1955	4th term	
Grey South	Eric Winkler	Progressive Conservative	1967	1st term	
Grey—Bruce	Edward Carson Sargent	Liberal	1963	2nd term	
Haldimand—Norfolk	James Noble Allan	Progressive Conservative	1951	5th term	
Halton West	George Albert Kerr	Progressive Conservative	1963	2nd term	
Halton East	James W. Snow	Progressive Conservative	1967	1st term	
Hamilton Centre	Norman Andrew Davison	New Democratic Party	1959	3rd term	
Hamilton East	Reg Gisborn	New Democratic Party	1955	4th term	
Hamilton Mountain	John Roxborough Smith	Progressive Conservative	1967	1st term	
Hamilton West	Ada Mary Pritchard	Progressive Conservative	1963	2nd term	
Hastings	Clarke Rollins	Progressive Conservative	1959	3rd term	
High Park	Morton Shulman	New Democratic Party	1967	1st term	
Humber	George Ben	Liberal	1965	2nd term	
Huron	Charles MacNaughton	Progressive Conservative	1958	4th term	
Huron—Bruce	Murray Gaunt	Liberal	1962	3rd term	
Kenora	Leo Bernier	Progressive Conservative	1966	2nd term	
Kent	John Purvis Spence	Liberal	1955	4th term	
Kingston and the Islands	Charles Joseph Sylvanus Apps	Progressive Conservative	1963	2nd term	
Kitchener	James Roos Breithaupt	Liberal	1967	1st term	
Lakeshore	Patrick Lawlor	New Democratic Party	1967	1st term	
Lambton	Lorne Charles Henderson	Progressive Conservative	1963	2nd term	
Lanark	George Ellis Gomme	Progressive Conservative	1958	4th term	
Leeds	James Auld	Progressive Conservative	1954	5th term	
Lincoln	Robert Stanley Welch	Progressive Conservative	1963	2nd term	
London North	John Robarts	Progressive Conservative	1951	5th term	
London South	John Howard White	Progressive Conservative	1959	3rd term	
Middlesex North	William Atcheson Stewart	Progressive Conservative	1957	4th term	
Middlesex South	Neil Leverne Olde	Progressive Conservative	1963	2nd term	Died in 1969
Middlesex South	Kenneth Charles Bolton (1969)	New Democratic Party	1969	1st term	Elected in a by-election in 1969
Muskoka	Robert James Boyer	Progressive Conservative	1955	4th term	
Niagara Falls	George Bukator	Liberal	1959	3rd term	
Nickel Belt	Gaston Demers	Progressive Conservative	1963	2nd term	
Nipissing	Richard Smith	Liberal	1965	2nd term	
Northumberland	Russell Rowe	Progressive Conservative	1963	2nd term	
Ontario	Matthew Bulloch Dymond	Progressive Conservative	1955	4th term	
Ontario South	Bill Newman	Progressive Conservative	1967	1st term	
Oshawa	Cliff Pilkey	New Democratic Party	1967	1st term	
Ottawa Centre	Harold Arthur MacKenzie	Liberal	1967	1st term	
Ottawa East	Jules Morin	Progressive Conservative	1955, 1967	3rd term*	
Ottawa South	Irwin Haskett	Progressive Conservative	1959	3rd term	
Ottawa West	Donald Hugo Morrow	Progressive Conservative	1948	6th term	
Oxford	Gordon William Innes	Liberal	1955, 1967	3rd term*	
Parkdale	James Beecham Trotter	Liberal	1959	3rd term	
Parry Sound	Allister Johnston	Progressive Conservative	1948	6th term	
Peel North	Bill Davis	Progressive Conservative	1959	3rd term	
Peel South	Douglas Kennedy	Progressive Conservative	1967	1st term	
Perth	Hugh Alden Edighoffer	Liberal	1967	1st term	
Peterborough	Walter Pitman	New Democratic Party	1967	1st term	
Port Arthur	Ronald Henry Knight	Liberal	1967	1st term	
Prescott and Russell	Joseph Albert Bélanger	Progressive Conservative	1967	1st term	
Prince Edward—Lennox	Norris Eldon Howe Whitney	Progressive Conservative	1951	5th term	
Quinte	Richard Thomas Potter	Progressive Conservative	1967	1st term	
Rainy River	T. Patrick Reid	Liberal-Labour	1967	1st term	
Renfrew North	Maurice Hamilton	Progressive Conservative	1958	4th term	
Renfrew South	Paul Yakabuski	Progressive Conservative	1963	2nd term	
Riverdale	Jim Renwick	New Democratic Party	1964	2nd term	
Sandwich—Riverside	Fred Burr	New Democratic Party	1967	1st term	
Sarnia	James Edward Bullbrook	Liberal	1967	1st term	
Sault Ste. Marie	Arthur Wishart	Progressive Conservative	1963	2nd term	
Scarborough Centre	Margaret Renwick	New Democratic Party	1967	1st term	
Scarborough East	Tim Reid	Liberal	1967	1st term	
Scarborough North	Thomas Leonard Wells	Progressive Conservative	1963	2nd term	
Scarborough West	Stephen Lewis	New Democratic Party	1963	2nd term	
Simcoe Centre	David Arthur Evans	Progressive Conservative	1960	3rd term	
Simcoe East	Gordon Elsworth Smith	Progressive Conservative	1967	1st term	
St. Andrew—St. Patrick	Allan Grossman	Progressive Conservative	1955	4th term	
St. Catharines	Robert Mercer Johnston	Progressive Conservative	1967	1st term	
St. David	Henry James Price	Progressive Conservative	1955	4th term	
St. George	Allan Frederick Lawrence	Progressive Conservative	1958	4th term	
Stormont	Fernand Guindon	Progressive Conservative	1957	4th term	
Sudbury	Elmer Sopha	Liberal	1959	3rd term	
Sudbury East	Elie Walter Martel	New Democratic Party	1967	1st term	
Thunder Bay	John Edward Stokes	New Democratic Party	1967	1st term	
Timiskaming	Donald Jackson	New Democratic Party	1967	1st term	
Victoria—Haliburton	Ronald Glen Hodgson	Progressive Conservative	1963	2nd term	
Waterloo North	Edward R. Good	Liberal	1967	1st term	
Waterloo South	Allan Reuter	Progressive Conservative	1963	2nd term	
Welland	Ellis Price Morningstar	Progressive Conservative	1951	5th term	
Welland South	Ray Haggerty	Liberal	1967	1st term	
Wellington South	Harry Worton	Liberal	1955	4th term	
Wellington—Dufferin	John Henry Haines Root	Progressive Conservative	1951	5th term	
Wentworth	Ian Deans	New Democratic Party	1967	1st term	
Wentworth North	Thomas Ray Connell	Progressive Conservative	1951	5th term	
Windsor West	Hugh Peacock	New Democratic Party	1967	1st term	
Windsor—Walkerville	Bernard Newman	Liberal	1959	3rd term	
York Centre	Donald Deacon	Liberal	1967	1st term	
York East	Arthur Meen	Progressive Conservative	1967	1st term	
York Mills	Dalton Arthur Bales	Progressive Conservative	1963	2nd term	
York North	William Hodgson	Progressive Conservative	1967	1st term	
York South	Donald C. MacDonald	New Democratic Party	1955	4th term	
York West	Leslie Rowntree	Progressive Conservative	1956	4th term	
York-Forest Hill	Edward Arunah Dunlop	Progressive Conservative	1963	2nd term	
Yorkview	Fred Matthews Young	New Democratic Party	1963	2nd term	
