= 29th Parliament of Ontario =

Parliament of Canadian city

The 29th Legislative Assembly of Ontario was in session from October 21, 1971, until August 11, 1975, just prior to the 1975 general election. The majority party was the Ontario Progressive Conservative Party led by Bill Davis.

Allan Edward Reuter served as speaker for the assembly until October 22, 1974. Russell Daniel Rowe succeeded Reuter as speaker.

== Members elected to the Assembly ==
Riding	Member	Party	First elected / previously elected	No. of terms	Notes
Algoma	Bernt Gilbertson	Progressive Conservative	1967	2nd term	
Algoma—Manitoulin	John Gordon Lane	Progressive Conservative	1971	1st term	
Armourdale	Gordon Carton	Progressive Conservative	1963	3rd term	
Beaches—Woodbine	Thomas Alfred Wardle	Progressive Conservative	1971	1st term	
Bellwoods	John Yaremko	Progressive Conservative	1951	6th term	
Brant	Robert Fletcher Nixon	Liberal	1962	4th term	
Brantford	Richard B. Beckett	Progressive Conservative	1971	1st term	
Carleton	Sid Handleman	Progressive Conservative	1971	1st term	
Carleton East	Albert Benjamin Rutter Lawrence	Progressive Conservative	1963	3rd term	Resigned in 1974
Carleton East	Paul Frederick Taylor (1974)	Liberal	1974	1st term	Elected in a by-election in 1974
Chatham—Kent	William Darcy McKeough	Progressive Conservative	1963	3rd term	
Cochrane North	René Brunelle	Progressive Conservative	1958	5th term	
Cochrane South	Bill Ferrier	New Democratic	1967	2nd term	
Don Mills	Dennis Roy Timbrell	Progressive Conservative	1971	1st term	
Dovercourt	George Adam Nixon	Progressive Conservative	1971	1st term	
Downsview	Vernon Milton Singer	Liberal	1959	4th term	
Dufferin—Simcoe	Alfred Wallace Downer	Progressive Conservative	1937	10th term	
Durham	Hugh Alex Carruthers	Progressive Conservative	1959	4th term	
Eglinton	Leonard Mackenzie Reilly	Progressive Conservative	1962	4th term	
Elgin	Ronald Keith McNeil	Progressive Conservative	1958	5th term	
Essex South	Donald Alexander Paterson	Liberal	1963	3rd term	
Essex—Kent	Dick Ruston	Liberal	1967	2nd term	
Etobicoke	Leonard A. Braithwaite	Liberal	1963	3rd term	
Fort William	James Hugh Jessiman	Progressive Conservative	1967	2nd term	
Frontenac—Addington	Wilmer John Nuttall	Progressive Conservative	1971	1st term	
Glengarry	Osie Villeneuve	Progressive Conservative	1948, 1963	6th term*	
Grenville—Dundas	Donald Roy Irvine	Progressive Conservative	1971	1st term	
Grey South	Eric Alfred Winkler	Progressive Conservative	1967	2nd term	
Grey—Bruce	Edward Carson Sargent	Liberal	1963	3rd term	
Haldimand—Norfolk	James Noble Allan	Progressive Conservative	1951	6th term	
Halton West	George Albert Kerr	Progressive Conservative	1963	3rd term	
Halton East	James Wilfred Snow	Progressive Conservative	1967	2nd term	
Hamilton Centre	Norman Andrew Davison	New Democratic	1959	4th term	
Hamilton East	Reg Gisborn	New Democratic	1955	5th term	
Hamilton Mountain	John Roxborough Smith	Progressive Conservative	1967	2nd term	
Hamilton West	Jack McNie	Progressive Conservative	1971	1st term	
Hastings	Clarke Rollins	Progressive Conservative	1959	4th term	
High Park	Morton Shulman	New Democratic	1967	2nd term	
Humber	Nicholas Georges Leluk	Progressive Conservative	1971	1st term	
Huron	Charles Steel MacNaughton	Progressive Conservative	1958	5th term	
Huron	John Keith Riddell (1973)	Liberal	1973	1st term	
Huron—Bruce	Murray Gaunt	Liberal	1962	4th term	
Kenora	Leo Edward Bernier	Progressive Conservative	1966	3rd term	
Kent	John Purvis Spence	Liberal	1955	5th term	
Kingston and the Islands	Charles Joseph Sylvanus Apps	Progressive Conservative	1963	3rd term	
Kitchener	James Roos Breithaupt	Liberal	1967	2nd term	
Lakeshore	Patrick Lawlor	New Democratic	1967	2nd term	
Lambton	Lorne Charles Henderson	Progressive Conservative	1963	3rd term	
Lanark	Douglas Jack Wiseman	Progressive Conservative	1971	1st term	
Leeds	James Auld	Progressive Conservative	1954	6th term	
Lincoln	Robert Stanley Welch	Progressive Conservative	1963	3rd term	
London North	Gordon Wayne Walker	Progressive Conservative	1971	1st term	
London South	John Howard White	Progressive Conservative	1959	4th term	
Middlesex North	William Atcheson Stewart	Progressive Conservative	1957	5th term	
Middlesex South	Robert Gordon Eaton	Progressive Conservative	1971	1st term	
Muskoka	Frank Stuart Miller	Progressive Conservative	1971	1st term	
Niagara Falls	John Twining Clement	Progressive Conservative	1971	1st term	
Nickel Belt	Floyd Laughren	New Democratic	1971	1st term	
Nipissing	Richard Stanley Smith	Liberal	1965	3rd term	
Northumberland	Russell Daniel Rowe	Progressive Conservative	1963	3rd term	
Ontario	Matthew Bulloch Dymond	Progressive Conservative	1955	5th term	
Ontario South	Bill Newman	Progressive Conservative	1967	2nd term	
Oshawa	Charles Elmer McIlveen	Progressive Conservative	1971	1st term	
Ottawa Centre	Michael Morris Cassidy	New Democratic	1971	1st term	
Ottawa East	Albert J. Roy	Liberal	1971	1st term	
Ottawa South	Claude Frederick Bennett	Progressive Conservative	1971	1st term	
Ottawa West	Donald Hugo Morrow	Progressive Conservative	1948	7th term	
Oxford	Harry Craig Parrott	Progressive Conservative	1971	1st term	
Parkdale	Jan Dukszta	New Democratic	1971	1st term	
Parry Sound	Lorne Maeck	Progressive Conservative	1971	1st term	
Peel North	William Grenville Davis	Progressive Conservative	1959	4th term	
Peel South	Robert Douglas Kennedy	Progressive Conservative	1967	2nd term	
Perth	Hugh Alden Edighoffer	Liberal	1967	2nd term	
Peterborough	John Melville Turner	Progressive Conservative	1971	1st term	
Port Arthur	James Francis Foulds	New Democratic	1971	1st term	
Prescott and Russell	Joseph Albert Bélanger	Progressive Conservative	1967	2nd term	
Prince Edward—Lennox	James A. Taylor	Progressive Conservative	1971	1st term	
Quinte	Richard Thomas Potter	Progressive Conservative	1967	2nd term	
Rainy River	T. Patrick Reid	Liberal-Labour	1967	2nd term	
Renfrew North	Maurice Hamilton	Progressive Conservative	1958	5th term	
Renfrew South	Paul Joseph Yakabuski	Progressive Conservative	1963	3rd term	
Riverdale	Jim Renwick	New Democratic	1964	3rd term	
Sandwich—Riverside	Fred Burr	New Democratic	1967	2nd term	
Sarnia	James Edward Bullbrook	Liberal	1967	2nd term	
Sault Ste. Marie	John Rhodes	Progressive Conservative	1971	1st term	
Scarborough Centre	James Francis Drea	Progressive Conservative	1971	1st term	
Scarborough East	Margaret Birch	Progressive Conservative	1971	1st term	
Scarborough North	Thomas Leonard Wells	Progressive Conservative	1963	3rd term	
Scarborough West	Stephen Henry Lewis	New Democratic	1963	3rd term	
Simcoe Centre	David Arthur Evans	Progressive Conservative	1960	4th term	
Simcoe East	Gordon Elsworth Smith	Progressive Conservative	1967	2nd term	
St. Andrew—St. Patrick	Allan Grossman	Progressive Conservative	1955	5th term	
St. Catharines	Robert Mercer Johnston	Progressive Conservative	1967	2nd term	
St. David	Margaret Scrivener	Progressive Conservative	1971	1st term	
St. George	Allan Frederick Lawrence (Note: elected to federal seat)	Progressive Conservative	1958	5th term	
St. George	Margaret Campbell (1973)	Liberal	1973	1st term	
Stormont	Fernand Guindon	Progressive Conservative	1957	5th term	Resigned in 1974
Stormont	George Samis (1974)	New Democratic	1974	1st term	Elected in a by-election in 1974
Sudbury	Melville Carlyle Germa	New Democratic	1971	1st term	
Sudbury East	Elie Walter Martel	New Democratic	1967	2nd term	
Thunder Bay	John Edward Stokes	New Democratic	1967	2nd term	
Timiskaming	Edward Michael Havrot	Progressive Conservative	1971	1st term	
Victoria—Haliburton	Ronald Glen Hodgson	Progressive Conservative	1963	3rd term	
Waterloo North	Edward R. Good	Liberal	1967	2nd term	
Waterloo South	Allan Edward Reuter	Progressive Conservative	1963	3rd term	
Welland	Ellis Price Morningstar	Progressive Conservative	1951	6th term	
Welland South	Raymond Louis Haggerty	Liberal	1967	2nd term	
Wellington South	Harry A. Worton	Liberal	1955	5th term	
Wellington—Dufferin	John Henry Haines Root	Progressive Conservative	1951	6th term	
Wentworth	Ian Deans	New Democratic	1967	2nd term	
Wentworth North	Donald William Ewen	Progressive Conservative	1963, (Note: Wentworth) 1971	2nd term*	
Windsor West	Edwin James Bounsall	New Democratic	1971	1st term	
Windsor—Walkerville	Bernard Newman	Liberal	1959	4th term	
York Centre	Donald MacKay Deacon	Liberal	1967	2nd term	
York East	Arthur Meen	Progressive Conservative	1967	2nd term	
York Mills	Dalton Arthur Bales	Progressive Conservative	1963	3rd term	
York North	William Marshall Chamberlain Hodgson	Progressive Conservative	1967	2nd term	
York South	Donald Cameron MacDonald	New Democratic	1955	5th term	
York West	John Palmer MacBeth	Progressive Conservative	1971	1st term	
York-Forest Hill	Philip Gerard Givens	Liberal	1971	1st term	
Yorkview	Fred Matthews Young	New Democratic	1963	3rd term	

== See also ==
- Members in Parliament 29
