= 31st Parliament of Ontario =

Parliamentary session of the Ontario Provincial Parliament

The 31st Legislative Assembly of Ontario was in session from June 9, 1977, until February 2, 1981, just prior to the 1981 general election. The Ontario Progressive Conservative Party led by Bill Davis formed a second consecutive minority government.

Russell Daniel Rowe served as speaker for the assembly until October 17, 1977. John Edward Stokes succeeded Rowe as speaker.

== Members ==
Riding	Member	Party	First elected / previously elected	No. of terms	Notes
Algoma	Bud Wildman	New Democratic Party	1975	2nd term	
Algoma—Manitoulin	John Gordon Lane	Progressive Conservative	1971	3rd term	
Armourdale	Bruce McCaffrey	Progressive Conservative	1977	1st term	
Beaches—Woodbine	Marion Bryden	New Democratic Party	1975	2nd term	
Bellwoods	Ross McClellan	New Democratic Party	1975	2nd term	
Brampton	Bill Davis	Progressive Conservative	1959	6th term	Premier and Party Leader
Brant—Oxford—Norfolk	Robert Nixon	Liberal	1962	6th term	Party Leader
Brantford	Mac Makarchuk	New Democratic Party	1967, 1975	3rd term*	
Brock	Bob Welch	Progressive Conservative	1963	5th term	
Burlington South	George Albert Kerr	Progressive Conservative	1963	5th term	
Cambridge	Monty Davidson	New Democratic Party	1975	2nd term	
Carleton	Sid Handleman	Progressive Conservative	1971	3rd term	
Carleton	Robert C. Mitchell (1980)	Progressive Conservative	1980	1st term	Elected in by-election in 1980
Carleton East	Evelyn Adelaide Gigantes	New Democratic Party	1975	2nd term	
Carleton-Grenville	Norm Sterling	Progressive Conservative	1977	1st term	
Chatham—Kent	William Darcy McKeough (Note: resigned)	Progressive Conservative	1963	5th term	
Chatham—Kent	Andrew Naismith Watson (1978)	Progressive Conservative	1978	1st term	Elected in by-election in 1978
Cochrane North	René Brunelle	Progressive Conservative	1958	7th term	
Cochrane South	Alan William Pope	Progressive Conservative	1977	1st term	
Cornwall	George Samis	New Democratic Party	1974	3rd term	
Don Mills	Dennis Roy Timbrell	Progressive Conservative	1971	3rd term	
Dovercourt	Antonio Lupusella	New Democratic Party	1975	2nd term	
Downsview	Odoardo Di Santo	New Democratic Party	1975	2nd term	
Dufferin—Simcoe	George R. McCague	Progressive Conservative	1975	2nd term	
Durham East	Sammy Lawrence Cureatz	Progressive Conservative	1977	1st term	
Durham West	George Ashe	Progressive Conservative	1977	1st term	
Durham—York	Bill Newman	Progressive Conservative	1967	4th term	
Eglinton	Roland McMurtry	Progressive Conservative	1975	2nd term	
Elgin	Ronald Keith McNeil	Progressive Conservative	1958	7th term	
Erie	Raymond Louis Haggerty	Liberal	1967	4th term	
Essex North	Dick Ruston	Liberal	1967	4th term	
Essex South	Remo J. Mancini	Liberal	1975	2nd term	
Etobicoke	Ed Thomas Philip	New Democratic Party	1975	2nd term	
Fort William	Michael Patrick Hennessy	Progressive Conservative	1977	1st term	
Frontenac—Addington	Joseph Earl McEwen	Liberal	1975	2nd term	
Grey	Robert Carson McKessock	Liberal	1975	2nd term	
Grey—Bruce	Edward Carson Sargent	Liberal	1963	5th term	
Haldimand—Norfolk	Gordon Irvin Miller	Liberal	1975	2nd term	
Halton—Burlington	Julian Alexander Arnott Reed	Liberal	1975	2nd term	
Hamilton Centre	Michael Norman Davison	New Democratic Party	1975	2nd term	
Hamilton East	Bob Warren Mackenzie	New Democratic Party	1975	2nd term	
Hamilton Mountain	Brian Albert Charlton	New Democratic Party	1977	1st term	
Hamilton West	Stuart Lyon Smith	Liberal	1975	2nd term	Party Leader
Hastings—Peterborough	Clarke Rollins	Progressive Conservative	1959	6th term	
High Park—Swansea	Edward J. Ziemba	New Democratic Party	1975	2nd term	
Humber	John Palmer MacBeth	Progressive Conservative	1975	2nd term	
Huron—Bruce	Murray Gaunt	Liberal	1962	6th term	
Huron—Middlesex	John Keith Riddell	Liberal	1973	3rd term	
Kenora	Leo Edward Bernier	Progressive Conservative	1966	5th term	
Kent—Elgin	James Fitzgerald McGuigan	Liberal	1977	1st term	
Kingston and the Islands	Keith Calder Norton	Progressive Conservative	1975	2nd term	
Kitchener	James Roos Breithaupt	Liberal	1967	4th term	
Kitchener—Wilmot	John Sweeney	Liberal	1975	2nd term	
Lake Nipigon	John Edward Stokes	New Democratic Party	1967	4th term	
Lakeshore	Patrick Lawlor	New Democratic Party	1967	4th term	
Lambton	Lorne Charles Henderson	Progressive Conservative	1963	5th term	
Lanark	Douglas Jack Wiseman	Progressive Conservative	1971	3rd term	
Leeds	James Auld	Progressive Conservative	1954	8th term	
Lincoln	Ross Hall	Liberal	1975	2nd term	
London Centre	David Robertson Peterson	Liberal	1975	2nd term	
London North	Ronald George Van Horne	Liberal	1977	1st term	
London South	Gordon Wayne Walker	Progressive Conservative	1971, (Note: London North) 1977	2nd term*	
Middlesex	Robert Gordon Eaton	Progressive Conservative	1971	3rd term	
Mississauga East	Milton Edward Charles Gregory	Progressive Conservative	1975	2nd term	
Mississauga North	Terry David Jones	Progressive Conservative	1975	2nd term	
Mississauga South	Robert Douglas Kennedy	Progressive Conservative	1967	4th term	
Muskoka	Frank Stuart Miller	Progressive Conservative	1971	3rd term	
Niagara Falls	Vincent George Kerrio	Liberal	1975	2nd term	
Nickel Belt	Floyd Laughren	New Democratic Party	1971	3rd term	
Nipissing	Mike Bolan	Liberal	1977	1st term	
Northumberland	Russell Daniel Rowe	Progressive Conservative	1963	5th term	
Oakville	James Wilfred Snow	Progressive Conservative	1967	4th term	
Oakwood	Anthony William Grande	New Democratic Party	1975	2nd term	
Oriole	John Reesor Williams	Progressive Conservative	1975	2nd term	
Oshawa	Michael James Breaugh	New Democratic Party	1975	2nd term	
Ottawa Centre	Michael Morris Cassidy	New Democratic Party	1971	3rd term	Party Leader
Ottawa East	Albert J. Roy	Liberal	1971	3rd term	
Ottawa South	Claude Frederick Bennett	Progressive Conservative	1971	3rd term	
Ottawa West	Reuben Conrad Baetz	Progressive Conservative	1977	1st term	
Oxford	Harry Craig Parrott	Progressive Conservative	1971	3rd term	
Parkdale	Jan Dukszta	New Democratic Party	1971	3rd term	
Parry Sound	Lorne Maeck	Progressive Conservative	1971	3rd term	
Perth	Hugh Alden Edighoffer	Liberal	1967	4th term	
Peterborough	John Melville Turner	Progressive Conservative	1971, 1977	2nd term*	
Port Arthur	James Francis Foulds	New Democratic Party	1971	3rd term	
Prescott and Russell	Joseph Albert Bélanger	Progressive Conservative	1967	4th term	
Prince Edward—Lennox	James A. Taylor	Progressive Conservative	1971	3rd term	
Quinte	Hugh Patrick O'Neil	Liberal	1975	2nd term	
Rainy River	T. Patrick Reid	Liberal-Labour	1967	4th term	
Renfrew North	Sean Conway	Liberal	1975	2nd term	
Renfrew South	Paul Joseph Yakabuski	Progressive Conservative	1963	5th term	
Riverdale	Jim Renwick	New Democratic Party	1964	5th term	
Sarnia	Paul Blundy	Liberal	1977	1st term	
Sault Ste. Marie	John Rhodes	Progressive Conservative	1971	3rd term	Died in 1978
Sault Ste. Marie	Russell Harold Ramsay (1978)	Progressive Conservative	1978	1st term	Elected in by-election in 1978
Scarborough Centre	James Francis Drea	Progressive Conservative	1971	3rd term	
Scarborough East	Margaret Birch	Progressive Conservative	1971	3rd term	
Scarborough North	Thomas Leonard Wells	Progressive Conservative	1963	5th term	
Scarborough West	Stephen Henry Lewis	New Democratic Party	1963	5th term	Party Leader, resigned seat in 1979
Scarborough West	Richard Frank Johnston (1979)	New Democratic Party	1979	1st term	Elected in a by-election in 1979
Scarborough—Ellesmere	David William Warner	New Democratic Party	1975	2nd term	
Simcoe Centre	George William Taylor	Progressive Conservative	1977	1st term	
Simcoe East	Gordon Elsworth Smith	Progressive Conservative	1967	4th term	
St. Andrew—St. Patrick	Lawrence Sheldon Grossman	Progressive Conservative	1975	2nd term	
St. Catharines	Jim Bradley	Liberal	1977	1st term	
St. David	Margaret Scrivener	Progressive Conservative	1971	3rd term	
St. George	Margaret Campbell	Liberal	1973	3rd term	
Stormont—Dundas—Glengarry	Osie Villeneuve	Progressive Conservative	1948, 1963	8th term*	
Sudbury	Melville Carlyle Germa	New Democratic Party	1971	3rd term	
Sudbury East	Elie Walter Martel	New Democratic Party	1967	4th term	
Timiskaming	Edward Michael Havrot	Progressive Conservative	1971, 1977	2nd term*	
Victoria—Haliburton	John F. Eakins	Liberal	1975	2nd term	
Waterloo North	Herbert Arnold Epp	Liberal	1977	1st term	
Welland—Thorold	Mel Swart	New Democratic Party	1975	2nd term	
Wellington South	Harry A. Worton	Liberal	1955	7th term	
Wellington—Dufferin—Peel	John McLellan Johnson	Progressive Conservative	1975	2nd term	
Wentworth	Ian Deans	New Democratic Party	1967	4th term	Resigned seat in 1979
Wentworth	Colin Francis Weeber Isaacs (1979)	New Democratic Party	1979	1st term	Elected in by-election in 1979
Wentworth North	Eric Gordon Cunningham	Liberal	1975	2nd term	
Wilson Heights	David Rotenberg	Progressive Conservative	1977	1st term	
Windsor—Riverside	Dave Cooke	New Democratic Party	1977	1st term	
Windsor—Sandwich	Edwin James Bounsall	New Democratic Party	1971	3rd term	
Windsor—Walkerville	Bernard Newman	Liberal	1959	6th term	
York Centre	Alfred Joseph Stong	Liberal	1975	2nd term	
York East	Robert Goldwin Elgie	Progressive Conservative	1977	1st term	
York Mills	Bette Stephenson	Progressive Conservative	1975	2nd term	
York North	William Marshall Chamberlain Hodgson	Progressive Conservative	1967	4th term	
York South	Donald Cameron MacDonald	New Democratic Party	1955	7th term	
York West	Nicholas Georges Leluk	Progressive Conservative	1971	3rd term	
Yorkview	Fred Matthews Young	New Democratic Party	1963	5th term	
