= David Boushy =

Canadian politician (born 1932)

Ontario MPP
- In office 1995–1999
- Preceded by: Bob Huget
- Succeeded by: Riding abolished
- Constituency: Sarnia

Personal details
- Born: January 25, 1932 (age 94) Lebanon
- Party: Progressive Conservative
- Profession: Businessman

David Boushy (born January 25, 1932) is a politician in Ontario, Canada. He served as a Progressive Conservative member of the Legislative Assembly of Ontario from 1995 to 1999 and is currently a City and County Councilor for Sarnia-Lambton.

== Background ==
He was educated at Narj' Oyoun National College in Lebanon. He worked for Esso Chemicals after moving to Canada, and was the founder and editor of the Sarnia Visitor's Guide. Boushy served for over 30 years as a city councillor for Sarnia City Council, and was the secretary of the local Progressive Conservative association.

== Politics ==
Boushy was elected to the Ontario legislature in the 1995 provincial election, defeating Liberal Joan Link and incumbent New Democrat Bob Huget. He served as a backbench supporter of Mike Harris's government for the next four years.

Boushy lost to Liberal Caroline Di Cocco by about 3,000 votes in the 1999 provincial election, in the redistributed riding of Sarnia—Lambton. He subsequently returned to municipal politics, and is still a member of the Sarnia municipal council as of 2017.

On November 18, 2005 a Long-standing Service Award was presented to David Boushy by the Ontario Government for his over 25 years of Municipal Service and for "showing immense leadership and commitment to his community of Sarnia Lambton".

== Electoral record ==
1995 Ontario general election
Party	Candidate	Votes	%	±%
Progressive Conservative	Dave Boushy	9260		
Liberal	Joan Link	8626		
New Democratic	Bob Huget	7487		
Family Coalition	Ron Raes	1642		
Freedom	Anthony Barbato	217		
Freedom	Andrew K. Falby	159		

1999 Ontario general election
Party	Candidate	Votes	%	±%
Liberal	Caroline Di Cocco	19,440	48.91	
Progressive Conservative	Dave Boushy	16,679	41.96	
New Democratic	Mark Kotanen	3,110	7.82	
Freedom	Andrew K. Falby	517	1.3	
