= Keith Butler (Ontario politician) =

Canadian politician (1920–1977)

Ontario MPP
- In office 1963–1967
- Preceded by: John J. Wintermeyer
- Succeeded by: Edward R. Good
- Constituency: Waterloo North

Personal details
- Born: 1920
- Died: 1977 (aged 56–57) Waterloo, Ontario
- Party: Progressive Conservative
- Occupation: Insurance broker

Keith Elkington Butler (1920 - 1977) was a Canadian politician, who represented Waterloo North in the Legislative Assembly of Ontario from 1963 to 1967 as a Progressive Conservative member.

== Background ==
Butler served in the Canadian Army and lost a leg in the battle for the Falaise Gap. He served as Vice-President of the National Council of War Veterans.

An insurance broker, by training, he owned and operated Butler Insurance Limited. He was an active member of the Anglican Church and President of the Kitchener-Waterloo chapter of the Canadian Cancer Society. Butler was married with two children.

Butler is buried in Woodland Cemetery, Waterloo, Ontario.

== Politics ==
Butler was elected in the provincial general election in 1963 and served in the 27th Legislative Assembly of Ontario as a backbench member of a majority PC government led by Premier John Robarts. Butler did not serve in Cabinet, but he was a member of an average of six Standing Committees of the Legislative Assembly during his term in office. He also served on the Select Committee on Youth, created in 1965 to study the status of all educational, recreational and employment opportunities available to youth in the province and determine what changes, if any, were required to ensure "the wider participation of youth in society" Running in Kitchener in the 1967 general election, he was defeated by the Liberal candidate, Jim Breithaupt, and he retired from politics.
