= Andy Brandt =

Canadian politician (1938–2023)

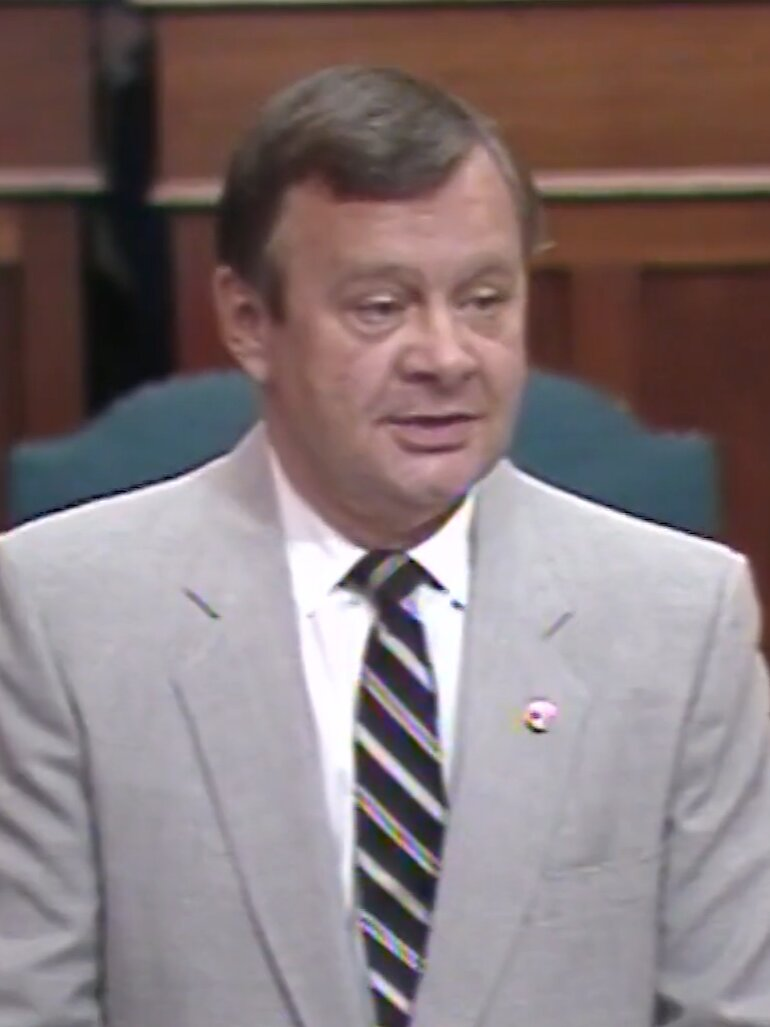
- Brandt in 1986

Ontario MPP
- In office 1981–1990
- Preceded by: Paul Blundy
- Succeeded by: Bob Huget
- Constituency: Sarnia

Interim Leader of the Ontario PC Party
- In office 1987–1990
- Preceded by: Larry Grossman
- Succeeded by: Mike Harris

Head of the Liquor Control Board of Ontario
- In office 1991–2006
- Preceded by: Jack Ackroyd
- Succeeded by: Phillip Olsson

63rd Mayor of Sarnia, Ontario
- In office 1975–1980
- Preceded by: Paul Blundy
- Succeeded by: Marceil Saddy

City Alderman, Sarnia, Ontario
- In office 1971–1974

Personal details
- Born: June 11, 1938 London, Ontario, Canada
- Died: December 22, 2023 (aged 85)
- Party: Progressive Conservative
- Spouse: Patricia Brandt
- Education: University of Waterloo
- Profession: Public administrator

Andrew S. Brandt (June 11, 1938 – December 22, 2023) was a Canadian politician and public administrator who served in a number of roles in the province of Ontario. He served in the Legislative Assembly of Ontario as a Progressive Conservative from 1981 to 1990, and was a cabinet minister in the governments of Bill Davis and Frank Miller. He later served as interim leader of the Progressive Conservative Party from 1987 to 1990 before being appointed chairman and CEO of the Liquor Control Board of Ontario.

== Background ==
Andrew S. Brandt was born June 11, 1938, in London, Ontario. Brandt was educated at the University of Waterloo, and was a businessman and musician before entering political life.

== Politics ==
Brandt ran for the House of Commons of Canada in the 1972 federal election as a Progressive Conservative, but lost to Liberal Bud Cullen by 1,465 votes in Sarnia—Lambton. Brandt served as an alderman in Sarnia from 1971 to 1974, and as mayor of the city from 1975 to 1980.

Brandt ran for the Ontario legislature in the 1977 provincial election, but lost to Liberal Paul Blundy, who had immediately preceded Brandt as Mayor of Sarnia, by 257 votes in the provincial electoral district of Sarnia. He ran again in the 1981 election and defeated Blundy by 3,029 votes, as the Progressive Conservatives won a majority government under Bill Davis. After serving as a parliamentary assistant to the Minister of Labour, Brandt was promoted to cabinet on July 6, 1983, as Minister of the Environment.

Brandt was originally neutral in the Progressive Conservative Party's 1985 leadership convention, but surprised delegates by endorsing Frank Miller from the convention podium. When Miller became Premier of Ontario on February 8, 1985, he appointed Brandt as his Minister of Industry and Trade. Brandt was easily returned in the 1985 provincial election. The Progressive Conservatives were reduced to a minority government, however, and soon lost a vote of confidence in the legislature. In opposition, Brandt served as his party's critic for Environment and Industry.

The 1987 provincial election proved disastrous for the Progressive Conservative Party, which was reduced to only sixteen seats out of 130 in the legislature. Brandt defeated Liberal Joan Link-Mellon by 2,661 votes. Party leader Larry Grossman was defeated in his own riding so Brandt was selected as interim leader on November 3, 1987, and held the position until Mike Harris was chosen as full-time leader on May 12, 1990. Brandt did not run in the 1990 election.

=== Cabinet positions ===
Miller ministry, Province of Ontario (1985)
Cabinet post (1)
Predecessor	Office	Successor
Frank Miller	Minister of Industry and Trade; 1985 (February–June)	Hugh O'Neil
Davis ministry, Province of Ontario (1971–1985)
Cabinet post (1)
Predecessor	Office	Successor
Keith Norton	Minister of Environment; 1983–1985	Morley Kells

== After politics ==
In 1991, Bob Rae appointed Brandt as chairman and CEO of the LCBO, the agency that owns and operates Ontario's publicly owned liquor stores. He was reappointed to the position four times by Rae, Harris and Ernie Eves, retaining the position for fifteen years, and remains the longest serving chair and CEO in LCBO history. He was noted for modernizing the LCBO's operations as well as convincing the provincial government not to privatize the service. He was accused of accepting inappropriate luxury trips in 1999, but was defended in the legislature and was soon after reappointed to a fourth term as chair and CEO.

In 2000, Brandt supported Stockwell Day for the leadership of the Canadian Alliance on the second ballot of the newly formed party's leadership contest.

Brandt retired as LCBO chairman on February 5, 2006, after fifteen years at the helm. During his time in the position, annual sales went from $1.8 billion in 1991 to a projected $3.6 billion in 2006.

Brandt died on December 22, 2023, at the age of 85.

== See also ==
- List of University of Waterloo people
