= Claudette Millar =

Canadian politician

Mayor of Preston, Ontario
- In office 1969–1973
- Succeeded by: Herself; as Mayor of Cambridge

First & Fourth Mayor of Cambridge, Ontario
- In office 1973–1974
- Preceded by: Position Established
- Succeeded by: Robert Kerr
- In office 1978–1988
- Preceded by: Erwin Nelson
- Succeeded by: Jane Brewer

Personal details
- Born: February 3, 1935 Belleville, Ontario, Canada
- Died: February 10, 2016 (aged 81) Guelph, Ontario, Canada
- Education: Millsaps College

Claudette Millar (February 3, 1935 – February 10, 2016) was a Canadian politician, most noted as the first mayor of Cambridge, Ontario.

== Biography ==
Millar was born February 3, 1935, in Belleville. She grew up primarily in Kitchener after relocating there with her family as a child. She obtained her pilot and driving licenses at age 16. Following graduation from Kitchener Collegiate Institute, Millar went on to study at Millsaps College in Jackson, Mississippi. She graduated in with a Bachelor of Arts.

Millar was elected mayor of Preston in 1969, becoming Canada's youngest mayor at 35. When Preston, along with Galt, Hespeler and Blair, was amalgamated into Cambridge in 1973, Millar was elected the city's first mayor. She served two non-consecutive periods: from 1973 until 1974 and again from 1978 to 1988.

As mayor, Millar was noted particularly for her work in preserving the city's cultural and environmental heritage. She opposed the construction of a freeway bypass which would have disrupted parkland in the city, including the Dumfries Conservation Area and the Rare Charitable Reserve.

She was a three-time Ontario Liberal Party candidate for the electoral district of Cambridge, losing to Monty Davidson in the 1975 election and the 1977 election, and to Mike Farnan in the 1987 election. She sought the Liberal nomination for Cambridge again in the 1999 election, but lost to Jerry Boyle.

Following the end of her term as mayor, Millar was appointed to the Ontario Municipal Board. In 2003 she returned to municipal politics, winning election to a seat on Waterloo Regional Council. In that role, she was instrumental in bringing the Toyota plant to Cambridge. She held the role until announcing her retirement in 2014. In 2015 Millar was inducted into the Region of Waterloo's Hall of Fame.

Millar died February 10, 2016, of stomach cancer after a brief stay at a Guelph, Ontario hospice. In November 2017, University of Waterloo announced the naming of a recently opened residence building as Claudette Millar Hall.
