= Bob Huget =

Canadian politician (1947–2022)

Member of the Ontario Provincial Parliament for Sarnia
- In office September 6, 1990 – April 28, 1995
- Preceded by: Andy Brandt
- Succeeded by: Dave Boushy

Personal details
- Born: May 28, 1947; Regina, Saskatchewan
- Died: June 1, 2022 (aged 71); Hamilton, Ontario
- Political party: Ontario New Democratic Party
- Profession: Businessman
- Portfolio: Minister without portfolio (1994–1995)

Robert "Bob" Huget (May 28, 1947 – June 1, 2022) was a politician in Ontario, Canada. He was a New Democratic Party member of the Legislative Assembly of Ontario from 1990 to 1995, and served as a cabinet minister in the government of Bob Rae.

== Background ==
Born in Regina, Saskatchewan, Huget was involved in the labour movement, serving as president and vice-president of Energy and Chemical Workers Union Local 800, and as a representative to the Sarnia District Labour Council.

== Politics ==
He was elected to the Ontario legislature in the 1990 provincial election, defeating Liberal candidate Mike Bradley by over 2,000 votes in the riding of Sarnia. He served as a parliamentary assistant from 1991 to 18 August 1994, when he was promoted to the position of minister without portfolio responsible for Economic Development and Trade.

The NDP were defeated in the 1995 provincial election, and Huget finished third in Sarnia in a close three-way race.

== Later life ==
After his defeat, Huget became administrative vice-president of the Communications, Energy and Paperworkers Union of Canada and chair of the Canadian Apprenticeship Forum. In 2003, he was a prominent opponent of Petro-Canada's decision to close its plant in Oakville. Huget died June 1, 2022, in hospital in Hamilton, Ontario, according to an obituary.

== Electoral record ==
1995 Ontario general election: Sarnia
Party	Candidate	Votes	%	±%
Progressive Conservative	David Boushy	9,260	33.81	+12.62
Liberal	Joan Link	8,626	31.49	+2.63
New Democratic	Bob Huget	7,487	27.33	-9.38
Family Coalition	Ron Raes	1,642	5.99	-3.11
Independent	Anthony Barbato	217	0.79	–
Independent	Andrew Falby	159	0.58	–
Total valid votes		27,391		

1990 Ontario general election: Sarnia
Party	Candidate	Votes	%
New Democratic	Bob Huget	10,860	36.71
Liberal	Mike Bradley	8,540	28.86
Progressive Conservative	Mike Stark	6,269	21.19
Family Coalition	Terry Burrell	2,691	9.10
Confederation of Regions	Bill Ferguson	652	2.20
Libertarian	Margaret Coe	574	1.94
Total valid votes		29,586	
