= Libertarian Party of Canada candidates in the 1980 Canadian federal election =

Aspect of the election

The Libertarian Party of Canada fielded a number of candidates in the 1980 federal election, none of whom were elected. Information about these candidates may be found on this page.

== Ontario ==
=== Walter Belej (Broadview) ===
Belej first campaigned for the House of Commons of Canada in the 1974 federal election. He identified himself as a twenty-seven-year-old unregistered architect. Although a member of the Libertarian Party, he ran as an independent. Some months after the election, he wrote a Letter to the editor defending a dental technician who was fined for practising without a licence. He described dentists as a "professional price-fixing gang" and argued in favour of a purely voluntary system.

He campaigned as an independent again in the 1975 provincial election, and later ran as an official candidate of both the federal and provincial Libertarian parties.

Electoral record
Election	Division	Party	Votes	%	Place	Winner
1974 federal	Broadview	Ind. (Independent Libertarian)	137		4/6	John Gilbert, New Democratic Party
1975 provincial	Riverdale	Independent	60		5/7	Jim Renwick, Ontario New Democratic Party
1977 provincial	Riverdale	Ontario Libertarian Party	196		5/6	Jim Renwick, Ontario New Democratic Party
1979 federal	Broadview—Greenwood	Libertarian	474	1.4	4/7	Bob Rae, New Democratic Party
1980 federal	Broadview—Greenwood	Libertarian	352	1.1	4/9	Bob Rae, New Democratic Party

=== Alex Eaglesham (Etobicoke North) ===
Eaglesham received 153 votes (0.72%), finishing sixth against the Ontario New Democratic Party incumbent Tony Grande. He later become leader of the Libertarian Party of Canada.
