= Sarnia (provincial electoral district) =

Former federal electoral district in Ontario, Canada

Ontario electoral district

Defunct provincial electoral district
- Legislature: Legislative Assembly of Ontario
- District created: 1966
- District abolished: 1996
- First contested: 1967
- Last contested: 1995

Sarnia was an electoral riding in Ontario, Canada. It was created in 1966 and was abolished in 1996 before the 1999 election. A new district, Sarnia—Lambton, was created from it and from parts of Lambton

== Members of Provincial Parliament ==
Sarnia
Assembly	Years	Member	Party
Created from parts of Lambton West
28th	1967–1971	Jim Bullbrook	Liberal
29th	1971–1975	Jim Bullbrook	Liberal
30th	1975–1977	Jim Bullbrook	Liberal
31st	1977–1981	Paul Blundy	Liberal
32nd	1981–1985	Andy Brandt	Progressive Conservative
33rd	1985–1987	Andy Brandt	Progressive Conservative
34th	1987–1990	Andy Brandt	Progressive Conservative
35th	1990–1995	Bob Huget	New Democratic
36th	1995–1999	David Boushy	Progressive Conservative
Sourced from the Ontario Legislative Assembly
Merged into Sarnia—Lambton before the 1999 election

== Election results ==
1995 Ontario general election
Party	Candidate	Votes	%	±%
Progressive Conservative	David Boushy	9,260	33.81	+12.62
Liberal	Joan Link	8,626	31.49	+2.63
New Democratic	Bob Huget	7,487	27.33	–9.37
Family Coalition	Ron Raes	1,642	5.99	–3.10
Independent	Anthony Barbato	217	0.79	–
Independent	Andrew K. Falby	159	0.58	–
Total valid votes		27,391	98.83	
Total rejected, unmarked and declined ballots		325	1.17	+0.16
Turnout		27,716	61.31	–3.54
Eligible voters		45,210		
Progressive Conservative gain from New Democratic		Swing		+11.00
Source: Elections Ontario

1990 Ontario general election
Party	Candidate	Votes	%	±%
New Democratic	Bob Huget	10,860	36.71	+21.46
Liberal	Mike Bradley	8,540	28.87	–5.65
Progressive Conservative	Mike Stark	6,269	21.19	–22.24
Family Coalition	Terry Burrell	2,691	9.10	+4.15
Confederation of Regions	Bill Ferguson	652	2.20	–
Libertarian	Margaret Coe	574	1.94	+0.07
Total valid votes		29,586	98.98	
Total rejected, unmarked and declined ballots		304	1.02	+0.60
Turnout		29,890	64.84	–0.79
Eligible voters		46,097		
New Democratic gain from Progressive Conservative		Swing		+21.85
Source: Elections Ontario

1987 Ontario general election
Party	Candidate	Votes	%	±%
Progressive Conservative	Andy Brandt	12,964	43.43	–17.82
Liberal	Joan Link-Mellon	10,303	34.51	+10.09
New Democratic	Catharine Giles	4,552	15.25	+3.52
Family Coalition	Terry Burrell	1,475	4.94	–
Libertarian	Margaret Coe	559	1.87	–0.73
Total valid votes		29,853	99.59	
Total rejected ballots		124	0.41	–0.23
Turnout		29,977	65.63	+5.69
Eligible voters		45,673		
Progressive Conservative hold		Swing		–13.95
Source: Elections Ontario

1985 Ontario general election
Party	Candidate	Votes	%	±%
Progressive Conservative	Andy Brandt	18,651	61.25	+15.02
Liberal	Michael Robb	7,438	24.42	–11.71
New Democratic	Duncan Longwell	3,572	11.73	–5.91
Libertarian	Margaret Coe	792	2.60	–
Total valid votes		30,453	99.36	
Total rejected ballots		197	0.64	+0.37
Turnout		30,650	59.94	–3.28
Eligible voters		51,134		
Progressive Conservative hold		Swing		+13.36
Source: Elections Ontario

1981 Ontario general election
Party	Candidate	Votes	%	±%
Progressive Conservative	Andy Brandt	13,871	46.23	+8.13
Liberal	Paul Blundy	10,842	36.13	–2.83
New Democratic	Stu Sullivan	5,292	17.64	–5.30
Total valid votes		30,005	99.73	
Total rejected ballots		81	0.27	–0.16
Turnout		30,086	63.22	–0.10
Eligible voters		47,586		
Progressive Conservative gain from Liberal		Swing		+5.48
Source: Elections Ontario

1977 Ontario general election
Party	Candidate	Votes	%	±%
Liberal	Paul Blundy	11,500	38.97	–18.73
Progressive Conservative	Andy Brandt	11,243	38.10	+7.00
New Democratic	Wallace Krawczyk	6,770	22.94	+12.46
Total valid votes		29,513	99.57	
Total rejected ballots		128	0.43	–0.05
Turnout		29,641	63.33	–0.61
Eligible voters		46,807		
Liberal hold		Swing		–12.86
Source: Elections Ontario

1975 Ontario general election
Party	Candidate	Votes	%	±%
Liberal	Jim Bullbrook	16,275	57.69	+5.26
Progressive Conservative	Carl E. Fleck	8,773	31.10	+3.69
New Democratic	Ivan Hillier	2,957	10.48	–9.67
Libertarian	Marek Wiechula	204	0.72	–
Total valid votes		28,209	99.52	
Total rejected ballots		136	0.48	–0.13
Turnout		28,345	63.94	–3.30
Eligible voters		44,332		
Liberal hold		Swing		+0.78
Source: Elections Ontario

1971 Ontario general election
Party	Candidate	Votes	%	±%
Liberal	Jim Bullbrook	14,422	52.44	+8.24
Progressive Conservative	Stan Campbell	7,538	27.41	–11.76
New Democratic	David Bell	5,544	20.16	+3.52
Total valid votes		27,504	99.39	
Total rejected ballots		169	0.61	–0.05
Turnout		27,673	67.23	+6.56
Eligible voters		41,159		
Liberal hold		Swing		+10.00
Source: Elections Ontario

1967 Ontario general election
Party	Candidate	Votes	%
Liberal	Jim Bullbrook	9,590	44.20
Progressive Conservative	Ralph Knox	8,498	39.16
New Democratic	J. Gavin Hall	3,611	16.64
Total valid votes		21,699	99.34
Total rejected ballots		144	0.66
Turnout		21,843	60.68
Eligible voters		35,999	
Liberal pickup new district.			
Source: Elections Ontario

== See also ==
- List of Canadian electoral districts
- Historical federal electoral districts of Canada
