= Paul Blundy =

Canadian politician

Ontario MPP
- In office 1977–1981
- Preceded by: Jim Bullbrook
- Succeeded by: Andy Brandt
- Constituency: Sarnia

Personal details
- Born: 1918
- Died: May 11, 1992 (aged 73–74) Sarnia, Ontario
- Party: Liberal
- Occupation: Funeral home director

Military service
- Allegiance: Canadian
- Branch/service: Royal Canadian Naval Volunteer Reserve
- Years of service: 1939–1945
- Battles/wars: Battle of the Atlantic

Paul Blundy (1918 – May 11, 1992) was a Canadian politician, who represented the electoral district of Sarnia in the Legislative Assembly of Ontario from 1977 to 1981. He was a member of the Ontario Liberal Party. He served as mayor of Sarnia, Ontario from 1967 until 1975.

== Background ==
Blundy served in the Royal Canadian Naval Volunteer Reserve during World War II. Blundy was the part-owner of a large funeral home in Sarnia. McKenzie & Blundy Funeral Home and Cremation Centre was founded by Blundy and a fellow naval reserve officer, Donald F. McKenzie, in 1946. In 1947, Blundy received his funeral home director's license. In 1950, their company put the first oxygen-equipped ambulance into service in the Sarnia area and they operated an ambulance service until 1956. Blundy was an active member of the Rotary Club of Sarnia and a member of Royal Canadian Legion Branch 62 in Sarnia.

== Politics ==
He ran in the 1977 provincial election, defeating Progressive Conservative candidate Andy Brandt, who had been his successor as mayor of Sarnia, by 257 votes. Blundy sat as a member of the opposition during the 31st Legislative Assembly of Ontario, during which the Progressive Conservatives maintained a minority government. He was the Liberal Party's critic for social services. He ran again in the 1981 election but was defeated by Brandt by 3,029 votes, as the Progressive Conservatives won a majority government under Bill Davis.
