= Sarnia City Council =

Sarnia City Council is the governing body for the city of Sarnia, Ontario, Canada.

The council consists of nine elected members: the Mayor, four members who serve as city and Lambton County council members, and four members elected as city councillors. The Mayor and all council members are elected to four-year terms and are elected at-large across the municipality.

== Current Sarnia City Council ==
Position	Representative(s)
Mayor	Carrie McEachran
City and County Councillors	Brian White
City and County Councillors	Adam Kilner
City and County Councillors	Mario Fazio
City and County Councillors	Chrissy McRoberts
City Councillors	Andrew Stokley
City Councillors	Terry Burrell
City Councillors	Lo-Anne Chan
City Councillors	Richard Felton
