= Jim Bullbrook =

Canadian politician (1927–1978)

Ontario MPP
- In office 1967–1977
- Preceded by: New riding
- Succeeded by: Paul Blundy
- Constituency: Sarnia

Personal details
- Born: June 1, 1927; North Bay, Ontario
- Died: October 27, 1978 (aged 51); Sarnia, Ontario
- Political party: Liberal
- Spouse: Joyce
- Children: 4
- Occupation: Lawyer

James Edward Bullbrook (June 1, 1927 – October 27, 1978) was a politician from Ontario, Canada. He was a Liberal member in the Legislative Assembly of Ontario representing the riding of Sarnia in from 1967 to 1977.

== Background ==
Bullbrook was born in North Bay, Ontario, in 1927. He attended law school and graduated in 1953. He married his wife, Joyce, in that same year. They moved to Toronto and then later settled in Sarnia, Ontario. He and Joyce raised four children.

== Politics ==
Bullbrook served as a member of Sarnia Town Council.

He ran for provincial office in 1967 as the Liberal candidate in the new riding of Sarnia. He defeated Progressive Conservative candidate Ralph Knox by 1,073 votes. He was re-elected in 1971 and 1975. He retired from politics in 1977 and returned to his law practice in Sarnia.

He died of a heart attack on October 27, 1978, at the age of 51.
