= 1977 Ontario general election =

Canadian provincial election

- June 9, 1977

125 seats in the 31st Legislative Assembly of Ontario 63 seats needed for a majority
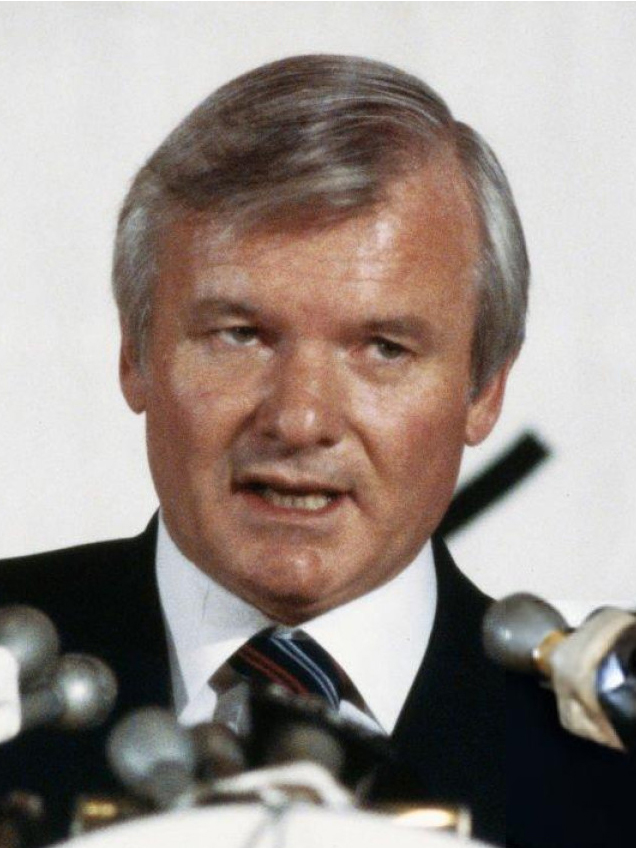

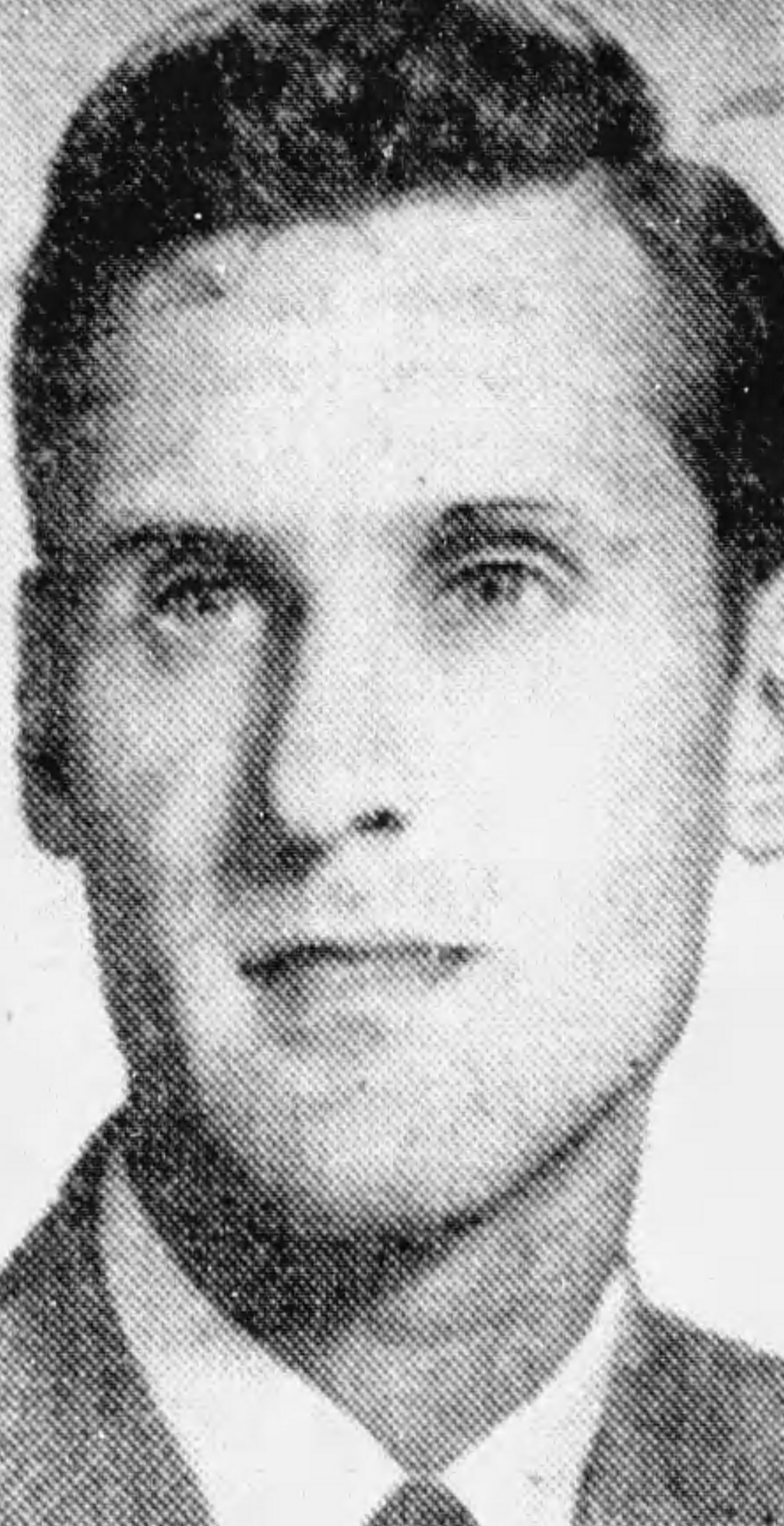
| | First party | Second party | Third party |
|---|---|---|---|
| | | LIB |
| Leader | Bill Davis | Stuart Smith | Stephen Lewis |
| Party | Progressive Conservative | Liberal | New Democratic |
| Leader since | February 12, 1971 | January 25, 1976 | October 4, 1970 |
| Leader's seat | Brampton | Hamilton West | Scarborough West |
| Last election | 51 | 35 | 38 |
| Seats won | 58 | 33 | 33 |
| Seat change | ▲7 | ▼2 | ▼5 |
| Popular vote | 1,322,723 | 1,042,474 | 940,961 |
| Percentage | 39.58% | 31.19% | 28.16% |
| Swing | ▲3.5pp | ▼3.2pp | ▼0.7pp |
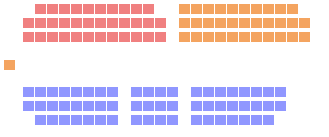
- Seating in chamber after the election
Premier before election
Bill Davis
Progressive Conservative
Premier after election
Bill Davis
Progressive Conservative

The 1977 Ontario general election was held on June 9, 1977, to elect the 125 members of the 31st Legislative Assembly of Ontario.

The Progressive Conservative Party, led by Premier Bill Davis, was re-elected for an eleventh consecutive term in office, again with a minority in the legislature. The PCs won an additional seven seats, but were not able to win a majority. The Liberal Party, led by Dr. Stuart Smith, lost one seat compared to its result in the previous election, but formed the Official Opposition because the NDP lost more seats. The New Democratic Party, led by Stephen Lewis, lost five seats, losing the status of Official Opposition to the Liberals.

Sheila Copps, future federal cabinet minister and Deputy Prime Minister of Canada, made her political debut in this election, finishing second in the riding of Hamilton Centre. This was the first election in which Jim Bradley, the second-longest serving MPP in Ontario history, was elected.

== Renaming of ridings ==
A 1976 Act made changes to the names of two ridings:

Renaming of ridings
| Old | New |
|---|---|
| Durham North | Durham—York |
| Welland | Welland—Thorold |

== Campaign ==
Riding contests, by number of candidates (1976)
| Candidates | PC | Lib | LL | NDP | Comm | Ltn | Ind | SC | D | Total |
| 3 | 64 | 62 | 2 | 64 | | | | | | 192 |
| 4 | 37 | 37 | | 37 | 16 | 10 | 7 | 4 | | 148 |
| 5 | 14 | 14 | | 14 | 8 | 13 | 6 | 1 | | 70 |
| 6 | 8 | 8 | | 8 | 7 | 7 | 8 | 2 | | 48 |
| 7 | 2 | 2 | | 2 | 2 | 1 | 4 | | 1 | 14 |
| Total | 125 | 123 | 2 | 125 | 33 | 31 | 25 | 7 | 1 | 472 |

A number of unregistered parties also contested this election. The North American Labour Party, consisting of Lyndon LaRouche supporters, ran three candidates in Toronto and three elsewhere in the province. The Revolutionary Marxist Group and League for Socialist Action fielded one candidate apiece; soon after the election, both groups merged into the Revolutionary Workers League.

Some members of the Social Credit Party also ran in the election, although it is not clear if they were formally endorsed by the party.

== Results ==
Elections to the 31st Parliament of Ontario (1977)
| Political party | Party leader | MPPs | | | | Votes | | | |
| Political party | Party leader | Candidates | 1975 | 1977 | ± | # | ± | % | ± (pp) |
|---|---|---|---|---|---|---|---|---|---|
| Progressive Conservative | Bill Davis | 125 | 51 | 58 | 7▲ | 1,322,723 | 129,771▲ | 39.58% | 3.51▲ |
| Liberal | Stuart Smith | 123 | 35 | 33 | 2▼ | 1,042,464 | 83,151▼ | 31.19% | 2.85▼ |
| Liberal–Labour | Stuart Smith | 2 | 1 | 1 | Steady | 8,242 | 824▼ | 0.25% | 0.02▼ |
| New Democratic | Stephen Lewis | 125 | 38 | 33 | 5▼ | 940,961 | 15,943▼ | 28.16% | 0.78▼ |
| Libertarian | Paul Mollon | 31 | – | – | – | 9,961 | 5,524▲ | 0.30% | 0.17▲ |
| Communist | William Stewart | 33 | – | – | – | 8,137 | 983▼ | 0.24% | 0.04▼ |
| Independent | | 25 | – | – | – | 7,414 | 3,321▲ | 0.22% | 0.10▲ |
| Social Credit | | 7 | – | – | – | 1,698 | 2,448▼ | 0.05% | 0.08▼ |
| Democrat | | 1 | – | – | – | 233 | 233 | 0.01% | New |
| Total | | 472 | 125 | 125 | | 3,341,833 | | 100.00% | |
| Rejected ballots | | | | | | 19,600 | 1,663▲ | | |
| Voter turnout | | | | | | 3,361,433 | 50,657▲ | 65.60 | 2.22▼ |
| Registered electors | | | | | | 5,123,768 | 620,626▲ | | |

=== Vote and seat summaries ===
Ternary plots - shift of electoral support (1975-1977)
1975

1977
Electoral districts identified by colours of winning parties

Seats and popular vote by party
| Party | Seats | Votes | Change (pp) |
|---|---|---|---|
| █ Progressive Conservative | 58 / 125 | 39.58% | 3.51 |
| █ Liberal/Liberal-Labour | 34 / 125 | 31.44% | -2.87 |
| █ New Democratic | 33 / 125 | 28.16% | -0.78 |
| █ Independent | 0 / 125 | 0.22% | 0.10 |
| █ Other | 0 / 125 | 0.60% | 0.04 |

=== Synopsis of results ===
Results by riding - 1977 Ontario general election
| Riding | Winning party | | | | | | Turnout (Note: including spoilt ballots) | Votes | | | | | |
| Name (Note: order is as given in EO reports) | 1975 | Party | Votes | Share | Margin # | Margin % | Turnout | PC | Lib/LL | NDP | Ind | Other | Total |
|---|---|---|---|---|---|---|---|---|---|---|---|---|---|
| Algoma | NDP | NDP | 6,917 | 48.70% | 1,166 | 8.21% | 77.64% | 5,751 | 1,534 | 6,917 | – | – | 14,202 |
| Algoma—Manitoulin | PC | PC | 7,381 | 56.64% | 3,895 | 29.89% | 64.79% | 7,381 | 2,165 | 3,486 | – | – | 13,032 |
| Brampton | PC | PC | 19,641 | 51.92% | 9,744 | 25.76% | 64.25% | 19,641 | 7,948 | 9,897 | 130 | 216 | 37,832 |
| Brantford | NDP | NDP | 13,376 | 46.79% | 4,295 | 15.02% | 64.87% | 9,081 | 6,130 | 13,376 | – | – | 28,587 |
| Brant—Oxford—Norfolk | Lib | Lib | 14,256 | 57.42% | 8,444 | 34.01% | 65.07% | 5,812 | 14,256 | 4,760 | – | – | 24,828 |
| Brock | PC | PC | 11,944 | 51.78% | 6,034 | 26.16% | 65.73% | 11,944 | 5,910 | 5,215 | – | – | 23,069 |
| Burlington South | PC | PC | 18,892 | 51.06% | 8,418 | 22.75% | 65.74% | 18,892 | 10,474 | 7,015 | – | 615 | 36,996 |
| Cambridge | NDP | NDP | 11,120 | 37.31% | 554 | 1.86% | 65.02% | 10,566 | 7,870 | 11,120 | – | 252 | 29,808 |
| Carleton | PC | PC | 14,847 | 46.51% | 4,606 | 14.43% | 62.96% | 14,847 | 10,241 | 6,837 | – | – | 31,925 |
| Carleton East | NDP | NDP | 12,733 | 34.77% | 681 | 1.86% | 65.09% | 12,052 | 11,837 | 12,733 | – | – | 36,622 |
| Carleton-Grenville | PC | PC | 14,002 | 59.61% | 8,509 | 36.22% | 63.39% | 14,002 | 5,493 | 3,995 | – | – | 23,490 |
| Chatham—Kent | PC | PC | 10,769 | 46.48% | 4,287 | 18.50% | 59.34% | 10,769 | 5,919 | 6,482 | – | – | 23,170 |
| Cochrane North | PC | PC | 10,412 | 61.44% | 6,365 | 37.56% | 67.02% | 10,412 | 2,488 | 4,047 | – | – | 16,947 |
| Cochrane South | NDP | PC | 12,533 | 51.26% | 2,277 | 9.31% | 69.89% | 12,533 | 1,442 | 10,256 | – | 219 | 24,450 |
| Cornwall | NDP | NDP | 9,978 | 46.08% | 486 | 2.24% | 63.95% | 9,492 | 2,089 | 9,978 | 94 | – | 21,653 |
| Dufferin—Simcoe | PC | PC | 15,528 | 48.81% | 6,048 | 19.01% | 65.30% | 15,528 | 9,480 | 6,369 | – | 438 | 31,815 |
| Durham East | NDP | PC | 12,862 | 41.66% | 122 | 0.40% | 65.38% | 12,862 | 5,121 | 12,740 | 153 | – | 30,876 |
| Durham West | NDP | PC | 12,688 | 41.30% | 593 | 1.93% | 65.89% | 12,688 | 5,075 | 12,095 | 865 | – | 30,723 |
| Durham—York | PC | PC | 14,134 | 51.44% | 7,134 | 25.96% | 66.17% | 14,134 | 6,345 | 7,000 | – | – | 27,479 |
| Elgin | PC | PC | 12,655 | 47.48% | 3,481 | 13.06% | 68.91% | 12,655 | 9,174 | 4,654 | – | 172 | 26,655 |
| Erie | Lib | Lib | 10,008 | 48.71% | 4,175 | 20.32% | 65.53% | 5,833 | 10,008 | 4,704 | – | – | 20,545 |
| Essex North | Lib | Lib | 9,801 | 51.19% | 4,837 | 25.26% | 56.75% | 4,383 | 9,801 | 4,964 | – | – | 19,148 |
| Essex South | Lib | Lib | 11,215 | 45.69% | 3,224 | 13.13% | 68.48% | 7,991 | 11,215 | 5,340 | – | – | 24,546 |
| Fort William | NDP | PC | 12,230 | 46.28% | 2,256 | 8.54% | 66.03% | 12,230 | 4,080 | 9,974 | – | 142 | 26,426 |
| Frontenac—Addington | Lib | Lib | 10,505 | 44.63% | 940 | 3.99% | 67.46% | 9,565 | 10,505 | 3,157 | 312 | – | 23,539 |
| Grey | Lib | Lib | 14,651 | 55.39% | 7,062 | 26.70% | 72.77% | 7,589 | 14,651 | 4,210 | – | – | 26,450 |
| Grey—Bruce | Lib | Lib | 14,828 | 55.47% | 5,403 | 20.21% | 75.53% | 9,425 | 14,828 | 2,477 | – | – | 26,730 |
| Haldimand—Norfolk | Lib | Lib | 15,496 | 49.37% | 3,864 | 12.31% | 71.38% | 11,632 | 15,496 | 4,257 | – | – | 31,385 |
| Halton—Burlington | Lib | Lib | 13,985 | 46.82% | 3,698 | 12.38% | 69.13% | 10,287 | 13,985 | 5,598 | – | – | 29,870 |
| Hamilton Centre | NDP | NDP | 8,216 | 37.86% | 14 | 0.06% | 58.29% | 5,092 | 8,202 | 8,216 | – | 189 | 21,699 |
| Hamilton East | NDP | NDP | 14,461 | 47.09% | 5,195 | 16.92% | 63.63% | 6,605 | 9,266 | 14,461 | – | 376 | 30,708 |
| Hamilton Mountain | PC | NDP | 12,681 | 38.26% | 373 | 1.13% | 72.12% | 12,308 | 7,910 | 12,681 | – | 247 | 33,146 |
| Hamilton West | Lib | Lib | 12,239 | 43.05% | 3,860 | 13.58% | 69.78% | 8,379 | 12,239 | 7,668 | 144 | – | 28,430 |
| Hastings—Peterborough | PC | PC | 11,442 | 47.22% | 1,858 | 7.67% | 73.02% | 11,442 | 9,584 | 2,808 | 247 | 149 | 24,230 |
| Huron—Bruce | Lib | Lib | 17,356 | 65.17% | 9,833 | 36.92% | 74.18% | 7,523 | 17,356 | 1,754 | – | – | 26,633 |
| Huron—Middlesex | Lib | Lib | 12,749 | 55.35% | 3,871 | 16.81% | 76.72% | 8,878 | 12,749 | 1,405 | – | – | 23,032 |
| Kenora | PC | PC | 10,882 | 57.14% | 5,626 | 29.54% | 67.29% | 10,882 | 2,907 | 5,256 | – | – | 19,045 |
| Kent—Elgin | Lib | Lib | 10,038 | 45.72% | 641 | 2.92% | 66.86% | 9,397 | 10,038 | 2,521 | – | – | 21,956 |
| Kingston and the Islands | PC | PC | 12,246 | 52.32% | 5,756 | 24.59% | 61.57% | 12,246 | 6,490 | 4,510 | – | 158 | 23,404 |
| Kitchener | Lib | Lib | 14,425 | 52.06% | 7,515 | 27.12% | 59.47% | 6,910 | 14,425 | 6,264 | – | 111 | 27,710 |
| Kitchener—Wilmot | Lib | Lib | 12,450 | 51.07% | 5,980 | 24.53% | 58.08% | 6,470 | 12,450 | 5,456 | – | – | 24,376 |
| Lake Nipigon | NDP | NDP | 7,747 | 67.01% | 5,330 | 46.10% | 58.91% | 2,417 | 1,397 | 7,747 | – | – | 11,561 |
| Lambton | PC | PC | 11,604 | 52.63% | 2,863 | 12.99% | 70.48% | 11,604 | 8,741 | 1,702 | – | – | 22,047 |
| Lanark | PC | PC | 11,086 | 55.42% | 6,089 | 30.44% | 67.67% | 11,086 | 3,919 | 4,997 | – | – | 20,002 |
| Leeds | PC | PC | 14,853 | 67.65% | 11,151 | 50.79% | 62.33% | 14,853 | 3,702 | 3,400 | – | – | 21,955 |
| Lincoln | Lib | Lib | 9,969 | 44.98% | 582 | 2.63% | 70.96% | 9,387 | 9,969 | 2,806 | – | – | 22,162 |
| London Centre | Lib | Lib | 12,808 | 45.42% | 3,893 | 13.80% | 59.52% | 6,279 | 12,808 | 8,915 | 200 | – | 28,202 |
| London North | Lib | Lib | 15,033 | 46.99% | 4,402 | 13.76% | 66.11% | 10,631 | 15,033 | 6,130 | – | 201 | 31,995 |
| London South | Lib | PC | 16,011 | 42.39% | 2,211 | 5.85% | 63.70% | 16,011 | 13,800 | 7,964 | – | – | 37,775 |
| Middlesex | PC | PC | 10,427 | 42.88% | 1,538 | 6.33% | 75.29% | 10,427 | 8,889 | 4,998 | – | – | 24,314 |
| Mississauga East | PC | PC | 11,945 | 45.25% | 3,489 | 13.22% | 60.17% | 11,945 | 8,456 | 5,994 | – | – | 26,395 |
| Mississauga North | PC | PC | 16,151 | 46.56% | 3,750 | 10.81% | 63.04% | 16,151 | 5,684 | 12,401 | – | 451 | 34,687 |
| Mississauga South | PC | PC | 13,622 | 47.91% | 6,006 | 21.12% | 67.08% | 13,622 | 7,616 | 7,196 | – | – | 28,434 |
| Muskoka | PC | PC | 8,865 | 49.23% | 2,497 | 13.87% | 73.00% | 8,865 | 2,774 | 6,368 | – | – | 18,007 |
| Niagara Falls | Lib | Lib | 13,280 | 43.42% | 3,928 | 12.84% | 68.11% | 9,352 | 13,280 | 7,952 | – | – | 30,584 |
| Nickel Belt | NDP | NDP | 9,410 | 57.45% | 5,487 | 33.50% | 67.45% | 3,923 | 3,046 | 9,410 | – | – | 16,379 |
| Nipissing | Lib | Lib | 12,898 | 43.13% | 1,666 | 5.57% | 71.28% | 11,232 | 12,898 | 5,777 | – | – | 29,907 |
| Northumberland | PC | PC | 14,061 | 48.30% | 3,727 | 12.80% | 68.07% | 14,061 | 10,334 | 4,716 | – | – | 29,111 |
| Oakville | PC | PC | 14,456 | 50.97% | 6,508 | 22.95% | 70.88% | 14,456 | 7,948 | 5,955 | – | – | 28,359 |
| Oshawa | NDP | NDP | 12,226 | 53.23% | 5,714 | 24.88% | 56.08% | 6,512 | 4,032 | 12,226 | – | 199 | 22,969 |
| Ottawa Centre | NDP | NDP | 10,626 | 41.56% | 2,403 | 9.40% | 56.75% | 8,223 | 6,358 | 10,626 | – | 360 | 25,567 |
| Ottawa East | Lib | Lib | 15,864 | 67.44% | 11,809 | 50.20% | 52.10% | 4,055 | 15,864 | 3,605 | – | – | 23,524 |
| Ottawa South | PC | PC | 16,662 | 49.37% | 7,903 | 23.42% | 66.95% | 16,662 | 7,754 | 8,759 | 574 | – | 33,749 |
| Ottawa West | PC | PC | 15,729 | 45.79% | 5,823 | 16.95% | 66.08% | 15,729 | 9,906 | 8,718 | – | – | 34,353 |
| Oxford | PC | PC | 17,758 | 50.98% | 5,101 | 14.64% | 69.24% | 17,758 | 12,657 | 4,420 | – | – | 34,835 |
| Parry Sound | PC | PC | 9,929 | 49.66% | 2,419 | 12.10% | 70.52% | 9,929 | 7,510 | 2,553 | – | – | 19,992 |
| Perth | Lib | Lib | 18,201 | 68.88% | 12,145 | 45.96% | 60.70% | 6,056 | 18,201 | 2,167 | – | – | 26,424 |
| Peterborough | NDP | PC | 16,923 | 40.66% | 2,648 | 6.36% | 70.97% | 16,923 | 10,083 | 14,275 | – | 341 | 41,622 |
| Port Arthur | NDP | NDP | 9,629 | 40.14% | 339 | 1.41% | 61.46% | 9,290 | 4,818 | 9,629 | – | 254 | 23,991 |
| Prescott and Russell | PC | PC | 11,863 | 48.74% | 2,986 | 12.27% | 62.54% | 11,863 | 8,877 | 3,597 | – | – | 24,337 |
| Prince Edward—Lennox | PC | PC | 11,411 | 55.22% | 5,652 | 27.35% | 68.00% | 11,411 | 5,759 | 3,494 | – | – | 20,664 |
| Quinte | Lib | Lib | 17,264 | 56.34% | 7,255 | 23.68% | 68.31% | 10,009 | 17,264 | 3,371 | – | – | 30,644 |
| Rainy River | LL | LL | 5,335 | 45.90% | 2,067 | 17.79% | 63.80% | 3,268 | 5,335 (Note: T. Patrick Reid was the incumbent) | 3,019 | – | – | 11,622 |
| Renfrew North | Lib | Lib | 9,549 | 45.80% | 2,732 | 13.10% | 73.96% | 6,817 | 9,549 | 4,483 | – | – | 20,849 |
| Renfrew South | PC | PC | 12,666 | 46.56% | 1,081 | 3.97% | 77.62% | 12,666 | 11,585 | 2,952 | – | – | 27,203 |
| St. Catharines | PC | Lib | 12,392 | 38.89% | 723 | 2.27% | 60.91% | 11,669 | 12,392 | 7,556 | – | 247 | 31,864 |
| Sarnia | Lib | Lib | 11,500 | 38.97% | 257 | 0.87% | 63.42% | 11,243 | 11,500 | 6,770 | – | – | 29,513 |
| Sault Ste. Marie | PC | PC | 19,209 | 55.28% | 7,549 | 21.73% | 69.64% | 19,209 | 3,715 | 11,660 | – | 162 | 34,746 |
| Simcoe Centre | PC | PC | 15,876 | 44.25% | 5,434 | 15.15% | 68.40% | 15,876 | 9,556 | 10,442 | – | – | 35,874 |
| Simcoe East | PC | PC | 13,793 | 44.74% | 3,539 | 11.48% | 69.47% | 13,793 | 6,783 | 10,254 | – | – | 30,830 |
| Stormont—Dundas—Glengarry | PC | PC | 10,533 | 49.15% | 2,422 | 11.30% | 68.28% | 10,533 | 8,111 | 2,788 | – | – | 21,432 |
| Sudbury | NDP | NDP | 11,117 | 41.62% | 2,632 | 9.85% | 62.39% | 8,485 | 6,778 | 11,117 | – | 330 | 26,710 |
| Sudbury East | NDP | NDP | 15,991 | 55.19% | 8,990 | 31.03% | 63.84% | 7,001 | 5,984 | 15,991 | – | – | 28,976 |
| Temiskaming | NDP | PC | 9,578 | 47.95% | 664 | 3.32% | 69.48% | 9,578 | 1,481 | 8,914 | – | – | 19,973 |
| Victoria—Haliburton | Lib | Lib | 15,218 | 53.27% | 4,679 | 16.38% | 75.15% | 10,539 | 15,218 | 2,809 | – | – | 28,566 |
| Waterloo North | Lib | Lib | 13,556 | 49.43% | 5,540 | 20.20% | 62.16% | 8,016 | 13,556 | 5,851 | – | – | 27,423 |
| Welland-Thorold | NDP | NDP | 12,704 | 46.32% | 2,315 | 8.44% | 69.58% | 10,389 | 4,335 | 12,704 | – | – | 27,428 |
| Wellington—Dufferin—Peel | PC | PC | 14,272 | 45.83% | 4,641 | 14.90% | 67.42% | 14,272 | 9,631 | 7,235 | – | – | 31,138 |
| Wellington South | Lib | Lib | 16,212 | 50.52% | 8,326 | 25.95% | 67.27% | 7,667 | 16,212 | 7,886 | – | 325 | 32,090 |
| Wentworth | NDP | NDP | 15,332 | 59.80% | 9,826 | 38.33% | 65.29% | 5,506 | 4,800 | 15,332 | – | – | 25,638 |
| Wentworth North | Lib | Lib | 18,322 | 53.98% | 9,858 | 29.04% | 71.18% | 8,464 | 18,322 | 7,157 | – | – | 33,943 |
| Windsor—Riverside | NDP | NDP | 12,947 | 45.59% | 2,375 | 8.36% | 60.71% | 4,878 | 10,572 | 12,947 | – | – | 28,397 |
| Windsor—Sandwich | NDP | NDP | 9,711 | 51.36% | 3,687 | 19.50% | 50.98% | 2,838 | 6,024 | 9,711 | – | 334 | 18,907 |
| Windsor—Walkerville | Lib | Lib | 11,233 | 53.09% | 6,391 | 30.20% | 57.03% | 4,842 | 11,233 | 4,565 | 162 | 357 | 21,159 |
| York Centre | Lib | Lib | 17,735 | 45.53% | 2,768 | 7.11% | 66.52% | 14,967 | 17,735 | 6,247 | – | – | 38,949 |
| York North | PC | PC | 15,639 | 48.05% | 5,979 | 18.37% | 64.38% | 15,639 | 7,247 | 9,660 | – | – | 32,546 |
| Armourdale | Lib | PC | 14,082 | 42.67% | 2,433 | 7.37% | 68.16% | 14,082 | 11,649 | 6,736 | 258 | 280 | 33,005 |
| Beaches—Woodbine | NDP | NDP | 11,491 | 46.51% | 2,274 | 9.20% | 64.90% | 9,217 | 3,579 | 11,491 | – | 420 | 24,707 |
| Bellwoods | NDP | NDP | 6,177 | 47.77% | 2,845 | 22.00% | 62.80% | 2,925 | 3,332 | 6,177 | 151 | 346 | 12,931 |
| Don Mills | PC | PC | 17,005 | 55.20% | 8,880 | 28.82% | 61.14% | 17,005 | 4,906 | 8,125 | – | 772 | 30,808 |
| Dovercourt | NDP | NDP | 7,340 | 48.30% | 3,157 | 20.77% | 64.62% | 4,183 | 3,162 | 7,340 | – | 513 | 15,198 |
| Downsview | NDP | NDP | 10,194 | 45.10% | 4,042 | 17.88% | 65.26% | 6,152 | 5,814 | 10,194 | 193 | 251 | 22,604 |
| Eglinton | PC | PC | 19,213 | 59.60% | 11,742 | 36.42% | 68.38% | 19,213 | 7,471 | 4,857 | 315 | 382 | 32,238 |
| Etobicoke | NDP | NDP | 11,637 | 45.99% | 4,848 | 19.16% | 64.36% | 6,789 | 6,363 | 11,637 | – | 517 | 25,306 |
| High Park—Swansea | NDP | NDP | 10,409 | 40.86% | 779 | 3.06% | 66.53% | 9,630 | 4,897 | 10,409 | – | 537 | 25,473 |
| Humber | PC | PC | 19,888 | 50.95% | 9,316 | 23.87% | 69.10% | 19,888 | 10,572 | 7,781 | – | 793 | 39,034 |
| Lakeshore | NDP | NDP | 13,252 | 49.76% | 5,295 | 19.88% | 62.39% | 7,957 | 4,781 | 13,252 | – | 643 | 26,633 |
| Oakwood | NDP | NDP | 9,214 | 43.48% | 2,835 | 13.38% | 64.98% | 6,379 | 5,046 | 9,214 | 170 | 382 | 21,191 |
| Oriole | PC | PC | 14,194 | 44.32% | 4,487 | 14.01% | 64.42% | 14,194 | 9,707 | 6,737 | 1,109 | 282 | 32,029 |
| Parkdale | NDP | NDP | 7,574 | 44.12% | 2,440 | 14.21% | 61.81% | 4,116 | 5,134 | 7,574 | – | 343 | 17,167 |
| Riverdale | NDP | NDP | 9,639 | 55.79% | 5,350 | 30.97% | 56.51% | 4,289 | 2,821 | 9,639 | 117 | 410 | 17,276 |
| St. Andrew—St. Patrick | PC | PC | 11,128 | 49.38% | 2,977 | 13.21% | 64.40% | 11,128 | 2,895 | 8,151 | – | 360 | 22,534 |
| St. David | PC | PC | 11,894 | 44.14% | 836 | 3.10% | 69.76% | 11,894 | 3,794 | 11,058 | – | 202 | 26,948 |
| St. George | Lib | Lib | 10,116 | 36.71% | 428 | 1.55% | 60.90% | 9,688 | 10,116 | 6,287 | 975 | 494 | 27,560 |
| Scarborough Centre | PC | PC | 11,583 | 44.76% | 2,799 | 10.82% | 64.00% | 11,583 | 5,274 | 8,784 | – | 238 | 25,879 |
| Scarborough East | PC | PC | 14,792 | 50.91% | 7,524 | 25.89% | 63.01% | 14,792 | 6,508 | 7,268 | – | 489 | 29,057 |
| Scarborough—Ellesmere | NDP | NDP | 10,625 | 40.52% | 1,551 | 5.92% | 63.77% | 9,074 | 6,320 | 10,625 | – | 201 | 26,220 |
| Scarborough North | PC | PC | 20,988 | 50.11% | 10,685 | 25.51% | 64.21% | 20,988 | 10,303 | 9,868 | – | 721 | 41,880 |
| Scarborough West | NDP | NDP | 13,350 | 54.03% | 6,444 | 26.08% | 63.81% | 6,906 | 3,837 | 13,350 | 172 | 442 | 24,707 |
| Wilson Heights | Lib | PC | 11,430 | 41.97% | 2,993 | 10.99% | 62.93% | 11,430 | 7,195 | 8,437 | – | 174 | 27,236 |
| York East | PC | PC | 14,131 | 46.72% | 5,797 | 19.17% | 67.55% | 14,131 | 7,126 | 8,334 | – | 654 | 30,245 |
| York Mills | PC | PC | 21,795 | 58.45% | 12,183 | 32.67% | 66.55% | 21,795 | 9,612 | 5,051 | 465 | 368 | 37,291 |
| York South | NDP | NDP | 14,178 | 50.56% | 6,512 | 23.22% | 65.86% | 7,666 | 5,332 | 14,178 | – | 864 | 28,040 |
| York West | PC | PC | 16,538 | 46.25% | 6,088 | 17.03% | 67.89% | 16,538 | 10,450 | 8,510 | – | 260 | 35,758 |
| Yorkview | NDP | NDP | 13,326 | 52.49% | 6,823 | 26.87% | 58.59% | 4,105 | 6,503 | 13,326 | 608 | 846 | 25,388 |

= open seat
= turnout is above provincial average
= winning candidate was in previous Legislature
= not incumbent; was previously elected to the Legislature
= incumbent had switched allegiance
= incumbency arose from byelection gain
= previously incumbent in another riding
= Liberal-Labour candidate
= other incumbents renominated
= multiple candidates

=== Analysis ===
Party candidates in 2nd place
| Party in 1st place | Party in 2nd place | | | Total |
| Party in 1st place | PC | Lib | NDP | Total |
|---|---|---|---|---|
| Progressive Conservative | | 31 | 27 | 58 |
| Liberal | 30 | | 3 | 33 |
| Liberal–Labour | 1 | | | 1 |
| New Democratic | 26 | 7 | | 33 |
| Total | 57 | 38 | 30 | 125 |

Candidates ranked 1st to 5th place, by party
| Parties | 1st | 2nd | 3rd | 4th | 5th |
|---|---|---|---|---|---|
| █ Progressive Conservative | 58 | 57 | 10 | | |
| █ Liberal | 33 | 38 | 52 | | |
| █ New Democratic | 33 | 30 | 68 | | |
| █ Liberal–Labour | 1 | | 1 | | |
| █ Communist | | | | 23 | 8 |
| █ Libertarian | | | | 19 | 9 |
| █ Independent | | | | 13 | 6 |
| █ Social Credit | | | | 6 | 1 |
| █ Democrat | | | | 1 | |

Resulting composition of the 28th Legislative Assembly
| Source | | Party | | | | |
|---|---|---|---|---|---|---|
| Source | | PC | Lib | LL | NDP | Total |
| Seats retained | Incumbents returned | 45 | 27 | 1 | 31 | 104 |
| Seats retained | Open seats held | 4 | 4 | | 1 | 9 |
| Seats retained | Ouster of incumbent changing allegiance | | 1 | | | 1 |
| Seats changing hands | Incumbents defeated | 7 | | | 1 | 8 |
| Seats changing hands | Open seats gained | 2 | 1 | | | 3 |
| Total | | 58 | 33 | 1 | 33 | 125 |

=== Seats changing hands ===
Eleven seats changed allegiance in this election:

PC to NDP

- Hamilton Mountain

PC to Liberal

- St. Catharines

Liberal to PC

- Armourdale
- London South
- Wilson Heights

NDP to PC

- Cochrane South
- Durham East
- Durham West
- Fort William
- Peterborough
- Timiskaming

=== MPPs elected by region and riding ===
Party designations are as follows:

PC
Liberal
NDP
Liberal-Labour

Northern Ontario

- Algoma: Bud Wildman
- Algoma—Manitoulin : John Lane
- Cochrane North: René Brunelle
- Cochrane South: Alan Pope
- Fort William: Mickey Hennessy
- Kenora: Leo Bernier
- Lake Nipigon: Jack Stokes
- Nickel Belt: Floyd Laughren
- Nipissing: Mike Bolan
- Port Arthur: Jim Foulds
- Rainy River: T. Patrick Reid
- Sault Ste. Marie: John Rhodes
- Sudbury: Bud Germa
- Sudbury East: Elie Martel
- Timiskaming: Ed Havrot

Ottawa Valley

- Carleton: Sid Handleman
- Carleton East: Evelyn Gigantes
- Lanark: Douglas Wiseman
- Ottawa Centre: Michael Cassidy
- Ottawa East: Albert Roy
- Ottawa South: Claude Bennett
- Ottawa West: Reuben Baetz
- Prescott and Russell: Joseph Albert Bélanger
- Renfrew North: Sean Conway
- Renfrew South: Paul Yakabuski

Saint Lawrence Valley

- Carleton—Grenville: Norm Sterling
- Cornwall: George Samis
- Kingston and the Islands: Keith Norton
- Leeds: James Auld
- Stormont—Dundas—Glengarry: Osie Villeneuve

Central Ontario

- Frontenac—Addington: J. Earl McEwen
- Hastings-Peterborough: Clarke Rollins
- Northumberland: Russell Rowe
- Peterborough: John Turner
- Prince Edward—Lennox: James A. Taylor
- Quinte: Hugh O'Neil
- Victoria—Haliburton: John Eakins

Georgian Bay

- Grey-Bruce: Eddie Sargent
- Muskoka: Frank Miller
- Parry Sound: Lorne Maeck
- Simcoe Centre: George Taylor
- Simcoe East: Gordon Elsworth Smith

Hamilton/Halton/Niagara

- Brock: Bob Welch
- Burlington South: George Kerr
- Erie: Ray Haggerty
- Halton—Burlington: Julian Reed
- Hamilton Centre: Mike Davison
- Hamilton East: Robert W. Mackenzie
- Hamilton Mountain: Brian Charlton
- Hamilton West: Stuart Smith
- Lincoln: Ross Hall
- Niagara Falls: Vince Kerrio
- Oakville: James Snow
- St. Catharines: Jim Bradley
- Welland-Thorold: Mel Swart
- Wentworth: Ian Deans
- Wentworth North: Eric Cunningham

Midwestern Ontario

- Brantford: Mac Makarchuk
- Brant—Oxford—Norfolk: Robert Nixon
- Cambridge: Monty Davidson
- Dufferin—Simcoe: George McCague
- Grey: Bob McKessock
- Haldimand-Norfolk: Gordon Miller
- Huron–Bruce: Jim Breithaupt
- Kitchener: Jim Breithaupt
- Kitchener—Wilmot: John Sweeney
- Oxford: Harry Craig Parrott
- Perth: Hugh Edighoffer
- Waterloo North: Herb Epp
- Wellington South: Harry Worton
- Wellington—Dufferin—Peel: Jack Johnson

Southwestern Ontario

- Chatham—Kent: Darcy McKeough
- Elgin: Ron McNeil
- Essex North: Dick Ruston
- Essex South: Remo Mancini
- Huron–Middlesex: Jack Riddell
- Kent—Elgin: Jim McGuigan
- Lambton: Lorne Henderson
- London Centre: David Peterson
- London North: Ron Van Horne
- London South: Gordon Walker
- Middlesex: Robert G. Eaton
- Sarnia: Paul Blundy
- Windsor—Riverside: Dave Cooke
- Windsor—Sandwich: Ted Bounsall
- Windsor—Walkerville: Bernard Newman

Peel/York/Durham

- Brampton: Bill Davis
- Durham East: Sam Cureatz
- Durham West: George Ashe
- Durham—York: Bill Newman
- Mississauga East: Bud Gregory
- Mississauga North: Terry David Jones
- Mississauga South: Douglas Kennedy
- Oshawa: Michael Breaugh
- York Centre: Alfred Stong
- York North: William Hodgson

Metropolitan Toronto

- Armourdale: Bruce McCaffrey
- Beaches—Woodbine: Marion Bryden
- Bellwoods: Ross McClellan
- Don Mills: Dennis Timbrell
- Dovercourt: Tony Lupusella
- Downsview: Odoardo Di Santo
- Eglinton: Roy McMurtry
- Etobicoke: Ed Philip
- High Park—Swansea: Ed Ziemba
- Humber: John MacBeth
- Lakeshore: Patrick Lawlor
- Oakwood: Tony Grande
- Oriole: John Williams
- Parkdale: Jan Dukszta
- Riverdale: Jim Renwick
- St. Andrew—St. Patrick: Larry Grossman
- St. David: Margaret Scrivener
- St. George: Margaret Campbell
- Scarborough Centre: Frank Drea
- Scarborough East: Margaret Birch
- Scarborough North: Thomas Wells
- Scarborough West: Stephen Lewis
- Scarborough—Ellesmere: David Warner
- Wilson Heights: David Rotenberg
- York East: Robert Elgie
- York Mills: Bette Stephenson
- York South: Donald C. MacDonald
- York West: Nick Leluk
- Yorkview: Fred Young

== See also ==
- Politics of Ontario
- List of Ontario political parties
- Premier of Ontario
- Leader of the Opposition (Ontario)
- Independent candidates, 1977 Ontario provincial election
