= Monty Davidson =

Canadian politician

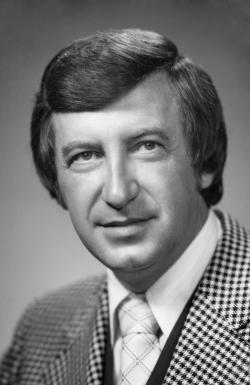

Ontario MPP
- In office 1975–1981
- Preceded by: New riding
- Succeeded by: Bill Barlow
- Constituency: Cambridge

Personal details
- Born: Montgomery Bryden Davidson; October 23, 1935
- Died: 26 March 2017 (aged 81) Cambridge, Ontario
- Party: New Democrat
- Spouse: Margaret
- Children: 6
- Occupation: Textile worker, Labour activist

Montgomery Bryden Davidson (23 October 1935 – 26 March 2017) was a Canadian politician. He was a New Democratic member of the Legislative Assembly of Ontario for the riding of Cambridge from 1975 until 1981.

== Background ==
Monty Davidson was a staff representative for the Textile Workers of America and a long-time union organizer. He went to work, at the age of 15, for the Stauffer and Dobbie Co. textile plant in Galt, Ontario and became shop steward at the age of 17.

== Politics ==
In the 1975 provincial election, Davidson ran as the NDP candidate in the new riding of Cambridge. He defeated Liberal candidate Claudette Millar by 1,593 votes. He was re-elected in 1977 defeating Progressive Conservative candidate Bill Barlow by 554 votes. In the 1981 election he again faced Barlow but lost to him by 849 votes. During his time as an MPP, he sat in opposition under NDP leaders Stephen Lewis and Michael Cassidy.

== Later life ==
In 1981, he took a job with the Occupational Health and Safety Branch of the Ontario Federation of Labour. He said, "It's a full-time job and I'm very fortunate that there were people looking out for me who were willing to give me this kind of work in an area that I'm familiar with." In his later career, he worked at the Workers Health and Safety Centre in Cambridge before retiring in 1999.

Davidson died on March 26, 2017. He was survived by Margaret, his wife of 62 years, and six children. The NDP association in Cambridge established an annual award in his memory "to celebrate [his] life-long service to working people".
