= Jack Johnson (Canadian politician) =

Canadian politician

Member of the Ontario Provincial Parliament
- In office 1987–1990
- Preceded by: New riding
- Succeeded by: Ted Arnott
- Constituency: Wellington
- In office 1975–1987
- Preceded by: New riding
- Succeeded by: Riding abolished
- Constituency: Wellington—Dufferin—Peel

Personal details
- Born: August 20, 1930 Detroit, Michigan
- Died: June 25, 2009 (aged 78) Mount Forest, Ontario
- Party: Progressive Conservative
- Spouse: Marnie Johnston
- Children: 3
- Occupation: Businessman

John McLellan Johnson (August 20, 1930 – June 25, 2009) was a politician in Ontario, Canada. He was a Progressive Conservative member who served in the Legislative Assembly of Ontario from 1975 to 1990. He represented the ridings of Wellington—Dufferin—Peel and Wellington.

== Background ==
Johnson was educated at Ryerson Polytechnical School in Toronto, and worked as a retail merchant. Johnson married Marie Lynn "Marnie" Johnston in 1951. She died in Mount Forest in September 2008. Together they raised three children.

== Politics ==
He was a councillor in the Town of Mount Forest from 1968 to 1973, and mayor from 1973 to 1975.

He was elected to the Ontario legislature in the 1975 provincial election, defeating Liberal candidate Ted Sibbald by 712 votes in the riding of Wellington—Dufferin—Peel. He was re-elected by greater margins in the elections of 1977, 1981 and 1985. In the 1987 provincial election, he defeated Liberal challenger Bill Benson by 463 votes in the redistributed riding of Wellington.

Johnson served as a backbench supporter of the governments of Bill Davis and Frank Miller from 1975 to 1985. He served as Chair of Caucus 1986-1990 and Deputy Opposition Whip. He did not seek re-election in 1990.

== Later life ==
Johnson was appointed to the Alcohol and Gaming Commission of Ontario Board of Directors in 2003, during the administration of Conservative Premier Ernie Eves.
