= Edward R. Good =

Canadian politician

Ed Good

Ontario MPP
- In office 1967–1977
- Preceded by: Keith Butler
- Succeeded by: Herb Epp
- Constituency: Waterloo North

Personal details
- Born: May 28, 1918 Kitchener, Ontario
- Died: March 28, 2002 (aged 83)
- Political party: Liberal
- Occupation: Funeral director

Edward R. Good (May 28, 1918 – March 28, 2002) was a Canadian politician, who represented Waterloo North (1967–1977) in the Legislative Assembly of Ontario from 1963 to 1975 as a Liberal member. He was first elected in the general election in 1967 and was re-elected in the elections in 1971 and 1975. He retired from politics in 1977.

He was born and grew up in Kitchener. Good married Rhea Mabelle Brown (1915–1997) on October 19, 1940. He attained the rank of second lieutenant with the Royal Canadian Artillery during the Second World War. Following the war, he founded the Edward R. Good Funeral Home in Waterloo in 1946 and he maintained his daily business participation for more than 50 years.

Good was widely known for his service as President of the Waterloo Lions Club, the Central Ontario Funeral Directors Association and as a member of the Royal Canadian Legion. Good was predeceased by his wife, in 1997, and they had three sons, Paul, David and John. Good completed his high school education at Kitchener-Waterloo Collegiate Institute, as the Kitchener-Waterloo Collegiate and Vocational School was then called, and then became a funeral services apprentice.
