= William Hodgson (Canadian politician) =

Canadian politician

Bill Hodgson

Ontario MPP
- In office 1967–1985
- Preceded by: A. A. MacKenzie
- Succeeded by: Greg Sorbara
- Constituency: York North

Personal details
- Born: March 18, 1912 Nobleton, Ontario
- Died: October 27, 1988 (aged 76) Kettleby, Ontario
- Party: Progressive Conservative
- Spouse: Eliza Barker
- Children: 4
- Occupation: Dairy farmer
- Portfolio: Deputy speaker (1974-1975)

William Marshall Chamberlain Hodgson (March 18, 1912 – October 27, 1988) was a politician in Ontario, Canada. He served in the Legislative Assembly of Ontario from 1967 to 1985, as a member of the Progressive Conservative Party.

== Background ==
Hodgson was born in Nobleton, Ontario to a family of seven children. He was educated at Bolton and worked as a dairy farmer. He and his wife Eliza raised four children, two sons and two daughters.

== Politics ==
He won election to the King Township school board in 1946, and later served as councillor, deputy reeve and reeve of the community from 1949 to 1962. He also served as warden of York County in 1959, and was chair of the King Township planning board from 1963 to 1967.

He was elected to York North riding in the Ontario legislature in the 1967 provincial election, defeating Liberal candidate Tom Taylor by 2,127 votes in York North. He was re-elected in 1971, 1975, 1977, and 1981, and served as a backbench supporter of the John Robarts, William Davis and Frank Miller administrations. Hodgson was defeated in the 1985 election, losing to Liberal Greg Sorbara by 4,095 votes.

== Death ==
He died of cancer in 1988.
