= Harry Worton =

Canadian politician

Ontario MPP
- In office 1955–1985
- Preceded by: William Ernest Hamilton
- Succeeded by: Rick Ferraro
- Constituency: Wellington South

48th Mayor of Guelph, Ontario
- In office 1952–1955
- Preceded by: J.A Clare
- Succeeded by: Harold Suitter

Personal details
- Born: February 17, 1921 Guelph, Ontario
- Died: March 22, 2002 (aged 81) Guelph, Ontario
- Party: Liberal
- Occupation: Baker

Harry Worton (February 17, 1921 – March 22, 2002) was a politician in Ontario, Canada who served as the 48th mayor of Guelph from 1952 to 1955. He also served in the Legislative Assembly of Ontario from 1955 to 1985, as a member of the Liberal Party.

== Background ==
Worton was born in Guelph, Ontario, and was educated at Guelph Collegiate. He worked as a baker in the city.

== Politics ==
Worton was an alderman for Guelph in 1945, 1946, 1947, 1950 and 1951, and served as the city's mayor from 1952 to 1955.

He was elected to the Ontario legislature in the 1955 provincial election, defeating incumbent Progressive Conservative William Hamilton by 1,968 votes in Wellington South. Worton's election occurred against the backdrop of a landslide victory by the Progressive Conservatives and was a reflection of his personal popularity. He was re-elected in 1959, 1963, 1967, 1971, 1975, 1977 and 1981, and all of his victories after from 1971 on were by landslide margins. Worton served his entire legislative career as an opposition member and retired in 1985. Ironically, the Liberal Party was able to form a minority government after the 1985 election.

He served as the Liberal Party Whip for a time and was known as a strong constituency worker. He supported Jim Breithaupt for the Liberal Party leadership in 1982. Worton never operated a riding office, and often met with local voters in his private home. In 2003, a local paper noted that Worton almost never spoke in the legislature but was strongly respected for his constituency service.

== Later life ==
Worton died in 2002. During his funeral service at St. George's Anglican Church, former Liberal leader Robert Nixon made the following comments: "I found my feet and became productive, but always with Harry's guidance. [...] It was an honour to be with him. I'll never forget him. He was my best friend."

Liz Sandals, the newly elected Liberal Member of Provincial Parliament (MPP) for Guelph, addressed Worton's legacy in her first speech to the legislature in 2003:

Harry Worton served the people of Guelph and Wellington South as MPP for an astounding 30 years, from 1955 to 1985. When I was in elementary school, I learned that Harry Worton was the MPP. When my kids went to elementary school, they learned that Harry Worton was the MPP. In fact, I suspect that if Harry were still alive and still running, Harry would still be the MPP. Political party really had nothing to do with it. The people of Guelph elected as MP Alf Hales, who was a Conservative and a butcher, and for MPP they voted for Harry Worton, who was a Liberal and a baker. There is no record of the people of Guelph-Wellington ever voting for a candlestick maker to finish off the rhyme. However, even Harry admitted that when he was first elected as alderman in Guelph in 1944, at the age of 23, he was elected because he promised to put more raisins in his buns.
