= Ontario New Democratic Party candidates in the 1975 Ontario provincial election =

This is a list of candidates for the Ontario New Democratic Party in the 1975 Ontario general election.

== Central Ontario ==
Riding	Candidate's Name	Notes	Residence	Occupation	Votes	%	Rank
Dufferin–Simcoe	Ian Perkins				3,317	11.61	3rd
Hastings—Peterborough	Bob Thompson				2,961	13.08	3rd
Northumberland	John Taylor				6,259		3rd
Peterborough	Gillian Sandeman	NDP candidate for Peterborough in the 1974 federal election			16,169		1st
Simcoe Centre	Paul Wessenger				11,623		2nd
Simcoe East	Roger Pretty				10,396		2nd
Victoria—Haliburton	F. McLaughlin				3,718		3rd

== Eastern Ontario/Ottawa ==
Riding	Candidate's Name	Notes	Residence	Occupation	Votes	%	Rank
Carleton	Gordon Kritsch				7,769		3rd
Carleton East	Evelyn Gigantes			Radio/television broadcaster	11,981	36.02	1st
Carleton—Grenville	Reg Willis				5,741	24.94	2nd
Cornwall	George Samis	Member of Provincial Parliament for Cornwall (1974–1985)		Teacher	11,927	51.11	1st
Frontenac—Addington	Bill Barnes				3,379	14.57	3rd
Kingston and the Islands	Lars Thompson				6,134	24.54	3rd
Lanark	George Murray				3,066	15.05	3rd
Leeds	John Fielding				5,721	23.95	2nd
Ottawa Centre	Michael Cassidy	Member of Provincial Parliament for Cornwall (1971–1984); Member of Ottawa City Council (1970–1972)	Ottawa	Journalist	10,658	38.92	1st
Ottawa East	Robert Cournoyer				4,543	18.59	3rd
Ottawa South	Eileen Scotton				11,099	32.43	2nd
Ottawa West	Sue Findlay				8,871		3rd
Prescott and Russell	R. DesRochers				5,027		3rd
Prince Edward—Lennox	Jan Nicol				3,250		3rd
Quinte	C. McLaughlan				4,744		3rd
Renfrew North	Robert Cox				5,938		3rd
Renfrew South	Lawrence Smith				3,479		3rd
Stormont—Dundas—Glengarry	Gerard Lussier				2,801		3rd

== Greater Toronto Area ==
Riding	Candidate's Name	Notes	Residence	Occupation	Votes	%	Rank
Armourdale	M. Mocciola				6,255	18.57	3rd
Beaches—Woodbine	Marion Bryden		Toronto	Researcher	10,500	45.67	1st
Bellwoods	Ross McClellan			Social worker	4,921	38.15	1st
Brampton	John Deamer				10,793	28.53	2nd
Burlington South	Bill Brown				8,859	23.90	3rd
Don Mills	Bob Sherwood				8,216	27.45	2nd
Dovercourt	Tony Lupusella		Toronto		5,748	41.84	1st
Downsview	Odoardo Di Santo			Journalist/paralegal	8,090	36.97	1st
Durham East	Doug Moffatt		Scugog	Teacher	12,824	41.96	1st
Durham North	Lesley Griffin				6,189	21.73	3rd
Durham West	Charles Godfrey			Physician	11,539	39.16	1st
Eglinton	Eileen Elmy				4,713	14.28	3rd
Etobicoke	Ed Philip		Rexdale	Educator	8,995	37.66	1st
Halton—Burlington	Bill Johnson				6,644	23.51	3rd
High Park—Swansea	Ed Ziemba	Candidate for Toronto City Council in the 1974 Toronto municipal election	Toronto		10,215	39.98	1st
Humber	Bob Curran				7,639	19.28	3rd
Lakeshore	Patrick Lawlor	Member of Provincial Parliament for Lakeshore (1967–1981)	Toronto	Lawyer	14,271	51.01	1st
Mississauga East	Larry Taylor				6,435		3rd
Mississauga North	David Busby				10,787		2nd
Mississauga South	Danny Dunleavy				7,102		3rd
Oakville	Doug Black				5,969		3rd
Oakwood	Tony Grande		Toronto	Teacher	7,388	39.25	1st
Oriole	Ken Crooke				7,409	23.3	3rd
Oshawa	Michael Breaugh		Oshawa	Teacher	14,442		1st
Parkdale	Jan Dukszta	Member of Provincial Parliament for Parkdale (1971–1981)		Psychiatrist	7,158	41.71	1st
Riverdale	Jim Renwick	Member of Provincial Parliament for Riverdale (1964–1984); President of the New Democratic Party (1967–1969)		Lawyer	9,133	50.3	1st
Scarborough Centre	Dave Gracey				5,595	26.28	2nd
Scarborough East	Ann Marie Hill				7,271	20.9	3rd
Scarborough—Ellesmere	David Warner	NDP candidate for York—Scarborough in the 1974 and 1972 federal elections		Teacher	9,452	39.2	1st
Scarborough North	Guy Beaulieu				7,268	19.1	3rd
Scarborough West	Stephen Lewis	Leader of the Ontario New Democratic Party (1970–1978); Member of Provincial Parliament for Scarborough West (1963–1978)			15,717	56.1	1st
St. Andrew—St. Patrick	B. Beardsley				7,627	34.6	2nd
St. David	Jim Lemon				7,990	30.5	2nd
St. George	Lukin Robinson				5,858	22.9	3rd
Wilson Heights	Howard Moscoe		Toronto	Teacher	7,476		3rd
York Centre	Tony Snedker				7,748	21.99	3rd
York East	Ed Chmielewski				5,918		3rd
York Mills	Allan Millard				7,252	18.5	3rd
York North	Robert Lewis				9,263		3rd
York South	Donald C. MacDonald	Member of Provincial Parliament for York South (1955–1982); President of the New Democratic Party (1971–1975); Leader of the Ontario New Democratic Party (1953–1970)	Toronto	Journalist/teacher	13,365	48.50	1st
York West	Ian Barrett				9,454	26.38	3rd
Yorkview	Fred Young			United Church minister	13,406	52.40	1st

== Hamilton/Niagara ==
Riding	Candidate's Name	Notes	Residence	Occupation	Votes	%	Rank
Brock	Fred Lindal				5,969	24.40	2nd
Erie	Maurice Keck				6,906	33.30	2nd
Hamilton Centre	Mike Davison		Hamilton		8,778	38.14	1st
Hamilton East	Robert W. Mackenzie	NDP candidate for Hamilton—Wentworth in the 1974 and 1972 federal elections CCF candidate for Windsor—Walkerville in the 1955 provincial election	Hamilton	Union leader (United Steelworkers)	13,971	47.83	1st
Hamilton Mountain	Brian Charlton		Hamilton		11,075	33.77	2nd
Hamilton West	Ray Fazakas				7,243	25.67	3rd
Lincoln	Ron Leavens				4,092	19.50	3rd
Niagara Falls	Peter Sobol				7,003		3rd
Welland	Mel Swart				10,209		1st
St. Catharines	Fred Dickson				9,215	31.81	3rd
Wentworth	Ian Deans	Member of Provincial Parliament for Wentworth (1967–1979)		Firefighter	14,791		1st
Wentworth North	C. Faulknor				8,180		3rd

== Northern Ontario ==
Riding	Candidate's Name	Notes	Residence	Occupation	Votes	%	Rank
Algoma	Bud Wildman		Echo Bay	Teacher	4,962	38.54	1st
Algoma—Manitoulin	Winston Baker				4,352	32.49	2nd
Cochrane North	René Brixhe				3,728	23.63	2nd
Cochrane South	Bill Ferrier	Member of Provincial Parliament for Cochrane South (1967–1977)		United Church minister	10,784	46.62	1st
Fort William	Iain Angus		Thunder Bay		9,173	36.59	1st
Kenora	Bill Watkins				5,165	30.25	2nd
Lake Nipigon	Jack Stokes	Member of Provincial Parliament for Thunder Bay (1967–1975)			6,603	50.50	1st
Muskoka	Ken Cargill				5,760		2nd
Nickel Belt	Floyd Laughren	Member of Provincial Parliament for Nickel Belt (1971–1998)	Sudbury	Economist/Professor at Cambrian College	10,481		1st
Nipissing	Mike O'Hallarn				5,054		3rd
Parry Sound	Larry Labine				2,973		3rd
Port Arthur	Jim Foulds	Member of Provincial Parliament for Port Arthur (1971–1987)	Port Arthur	Teacher	12,213	49.74	1st
Rainy River	M. Lichtenstein				2,259		3rd
Sault Ste. Marie	Ron Moreau				13,470	39.67	2nd
Sudbury	Bud Germa	Member of Provincial Parliament for Sudbury (1971–1981); Member of Parliament for Sudbury (1967–1968)			11,511		1st
Sudbury East	Elie Martel	Member of Provincial Parliament for Sudbury East (1967–1987)	Sudbury	Teacher	18,650		1st
Timiskaming	Robert Bain			Small business owner			1st

== Southwestern Ontario ==
Riding	Candidate's Name	Notes	Residence	Occupation	Votes	%	Rank
Brant—Oxford—Norfolk	Jim Schneider				4,791	18.36	3rd
Brantford	Mac Makarchuk	Member of Provincial Parliament for Brantford (1967–1971)	Brantford	Journalist	12,048	39.05	1st
Cambridge	Monty Davidson			Union leader (Textile Workers Union of America)	11,399	38.20	1st
Chatham—Kent	Ron Franko				5,728	24.67	3rd
Essex North	Lucien Lacasse				7,678	35.42	2nd
Essex South	Ralph Wensley				6,058	26.36	3rd
Grey	Colin L. Swan				2,835	10.98	3rd
Grey–Bruce	Lorne Creighton				1,235	5.18	3rd
Haldimand—Norfolk	Norm Walpole				4,967	15.82	3rd
Huron—Bruce	Donald Milne				2,635	10.48	3rd
Huron—Middlesex	Paul Carroll				1,967	9.02	3rd
Kent—Elgin	Ray McGaffey				2,242	9.92	3rd
Kitchener	Meg Young				7,367	25.14	3rd
Kitchener—Wilmot	M. Rosenberg				8,184	33.42	2nd
Lambton	Maurice Payne				1,181	5.52	3rd
London Centre	Pat Chefurka				7,896	27.46	3rd
London North	Mike Warren				5,570	18.05	3rd
London South	Edith Welch				7,171	19.88	3rd
Middlesex	H. Aitkenhead				3,127		3rd
Oxford	Peter Klynstra				4,675		3rd
Perth	Larry J. Wraith				2,989		3rd
Sarnia	Ivan Hillier				2,957	10.48	3rd
Waterloo North	Jack Kersell				6,880		3rd
Wellington South	Carl Hamilton				6,833		2nd
Wellington—Dufferin—Peel	Gerry Campbell				6,169		3rd
Windsor—Riverside	Fred Burr			Teacher	13,273	47.85	1st
Windsor—Sandwich	Ted Bounsall	Member of Provincial Parliament for Windsor West (1971–1975)	Windsor	Professor at the University of Windsor	10,543		1st
Windsor—Walkerville	David Burr				6,923		2nd
