= Ontario New Democratic Party candidates in the 1977 Ontario provincial election =

The New Democratic Party of Ontario ran a full slate of candidates in the 1977 Ontario provincial election, Canada, and won 33 seats to become the third-largest party in the legislature.

== Central Ontario ==
Riding	Candidate's Name	Notes	Residence	Occupation	Votes	%	Rank
Dufferin–Simcoe	Bill Fox				6,369	20.02	3rd
Hastings—Peterborough	Elmer Buchanan				2,808	11.59	3rd
Northumberland	John Taylor				4,716	16.20	3rd
Peterborough	Gillian Sandeman				14,275	34.30	2nd
Simcoe Centre	Paul Wessenger				10,442	29.11	2nd
Simcoe East	Roger Pretty				10,254	33.26	2nd
Victoria—Haliburton	Fred McLaughlin				5,851	18.51	3rd

== Eastern Ontario/Ottawa ==
Riding	Candidate's Name	Notes	Residence	Occupation	Votes	%	Rank
Carleton	Judy Wasylycia-Leis				6,837	21.41	3rd
Carleton East	Evelyn Gigantes			Radio/television broadcaster	12,733	34.77	1st
Carleton—Grenville	Jack McLachlen				3,995	17.01	3rd
Cornwall	George Samis	Member of Provincial Parliament for Cornwall (1974–1985)		Teacher	9,978	46.08	1st
Frontenac—Addington	Bill Barnes				3,280	13.69	3rd
Kingston and the Islands	John Clements				4,510	19.27	3rd
Lanark	Bev Greenslade				4,997	24.98	2nd
Leeds	Jim Morrison				3,400	15.49	3rd
Ottawa Centre	Michael Cassidy	Member of Provincial Parliament for Cornwall (1971–1984); Member of Ottawa City Council (1970–1972)	Ottawa	Journalist	10,626	41.56	1st
Ottawa East	Robert Choquette				3,605	15.32	3rd
Ottawa South	Eileen Scotton				8,759	25.95	2nd
Ottawa West	Marion Dewar				8,718	25.71	3rd
Prescott and Russell	Joseph Cheff				3,597	14.78	3rd
Prince Edward—Lennox	Jan Nicol				3,494	16.91	3rd
Quinte	None				–	–	–
Renfrew North	Robert Cox				4,482	21.50	3rd
Renfrew South	Harry Pattinson				2,952	10.85	3rd
Stormont—Dundas—Glengarry	Joe O'Neill				2,788	13.01	3rd

== Greater Toronto Area ==
Riding	Candidate's Name	Notes	Residence	Occupation	Votes	%	Rank
Armourdale	Marlene Koehler				6,736	20.41	3rd
Beaches—Woodbine	Marion Bryden		Toronto	Researcher	11,491	46.51	1st
Bellwoods	Ross McClellan			Social worker	6,177	47.76	1st
Brampton	John Deamer				9,897	26.16	2nd
Burlington South	Bill Brown				7,015	18.96	3rd
Don Mills	Steve Thomas				8,125	26.37	2nd
Dovercourt	Tony Lupusella		Toronto		7,340	48.30	1st
Downsview	Odoardo Di Santo			Journalist/paralegal	10,194	45.10	1st
Durham East	Doug Moffatt		Scugog	Teacher	12,740	41.26	1st
Durham West	Charles Godfrey			Physician	12,095	39.37	2nd
Durham—York	Allan McPhail				7,000	25.47	2nd
Eglinton	Eileen Elmy				4,857	15.07	3rd
Etobicoke	Ed Philip		Rexdale	Educator	11,637	45.99	1st
Halton—Burlington	Bill Johnson				5,598	18.74	3rd
High Park—Swansea	Ed Ziemba		Toronto		10,409	40.86	1st
Humber	Bob Curran				7,781	19.93	3rd
Lakeshore	Patrick Lawlor	Member of Provincial Parliament for Lakeshore (1967–1981)	Toronto	Lawyer	13,345	52.16	1st
Mississauga East	Neil Davis				5,994	22.71	3rd
Mississauga North	David Busby				12,401	35.75	2nd
Mississauga South	Ted Humphreys				7,196	25.31	3rd
Oakville	Doug Black				5,955	21.00	3rd
Oakwood	Tony Grande		Toronto	Teacher	9,214	43.48	1st
Oriole	Fred Birket				6,737	21.03	3rd
Oshawa	Michael Breaugh		Oshawa	Teacher	12,226	53.23	1st
Parkdale	Jan Dukszta	Member of Provincial Parliament for Parkdale (1971–1981)		Psychiatrist	7,574	44.12	1st
Riverdale	Jim Renwick	Member of Provincial Parliament for Riverdale (1964–1984); President of the New Democratic Party (1967–1969)		Lawyer	9,639	55.79	1st
Scarborough Centre	Dave Gracey				8,806	33.14	2nd
Scarborough East	Ann Marie Hill				7,218	24.84	2nd
Scarborough—Ellesmere	David Warner	NDP candidate for York—Scarborough in the 1974 and 1972 federal elections		Teacher	11,150	40.40	1st
Scarborough North	Guy Beaulieu				10,015	23.57	3rd
Scarborough West	Stephen Lewis	Leader of the Ontario New Democratic Party (1970–1978); Member of Provincial Parliament for Scarborough West (1963–1978)			13,340	53.96	1st
St. Andrew—St. Patrick	Barbara Beardsley				8,452	36.05	2nd
St. David	Gordon Cressy				11,058	41.03	2nd
St. George	Lukin Robinson				6,171	22.21	3rd
Wilson Heights	Howard Moscoe		Toronto	Teacher	8,437	30.98	2nd
York Centre	Chris Olsen				6,277	15.83	3rd
York East	Lois Cox				8,334	27.55	2nd
York Mills	Allan Millard				5,071	13.66	3rd
York North	Ian Scott				7,247	22.27	3rd
York South	Donald C. MacDonald	Member of Provincial Parliament for York South (1955–1982); President of the New Democratic Party (1971–1975); Leader of the Ontario New Democratic Party (1953–1970)	Toronto	Journalist/teacher	14,178	50.56	1st
York West	Ian Barrett				8,510	23.80	3rd
Yorkview	Fred Young			United Church minister	14,426	54.46	1st

== Hamilton/Niagara ==
Riding	Candidate's Name	Notes	Residence	Occupation	Votes	%	Rank
Brock	Robert Hoover				5,215	22.61	3rd
Erie	Barrie MacLeod				4,704	22.90	3rd
Hamilton Centre	Mike Davison		Hamilton		8,216	37.86	1st
Hamilton East	Robert W. Mackenzie		Hamilton	Union leader (United Steelworkers)	14,461	47.09	1st
Hamilton Mountain	Brian Charlton		Hamilton		12,681	38.26	1st
Hamilton West	Marjorie Baskin				7,668	26.97	3rd
Lincoln	Barbara Mersereau				2,806	12.66	3rd
Niagara Falls	Peter Sobol				7,952	26.00	3rd
St. Catharines	Fred Dickson	ONDP candidate for St. Catharines in the 1975 provincial election NDP candidate for St. Catharines in the 1974 federal election	St. Catharines	Financial advisor	7,556	23.71	3rd
Welland–Thorold	Mel Swart				12,704	46.32	1st
Wentworth	Ian Deans	Member of Provincial Parliament for Wentworth (1967–1979)		Firefighter	15,332	59.80	1st
Wentworth North	Dennis Young				7,157	21.09	3rd

== Northern Ontario ==
Riding	Candidate's Name	Notes	Residence	Occupation	Votes	%	Rank
Algoma	Bud Wildman		Echo Bay	Teacher	6,917	48.70	1st
Algoma—Manitoulin	Tasso Christie				2,165	16.61	3rd
Cochrane North	Robert Fortin				4,047	23.88	2nd
Cochrane South	Bill Ferrier	Member of Provincial Parliament for Cochrane South (1967–1977)		United Church minister	10,256	41.95	2nd
Fort William	Iain Angus		Thunder Bay		9,974	37.74	2nd
Kenora	Bill Watkins				5,256	27.60	2nd
Lake Nipigon	Jack Stokes	Member of Provincial Parliament for Thunder Bay (1967–1975)			7,747	67.01	1st
Muskoka	Ken Cargill				6,368	35.36	2nd
Nickel Belt	Floyd Laughren	Member of Provincial Parliament for Nickel Belt (1971–1998)	Sudbury	Economist/Professor at Cambrian College	9,410	57.45	1st
Nipissing	Dennis Arsenault				5,777	19.32	3rd
Parry Sound	Ray Smith				2,553	12.77	3rd
Port Arthur	Jim Foulds	Member of Provincial Parliament for Port Arthur (1971–1987)	Port Arthur	Teacher	9,629	40.14	1st
Rainy River	Howard Hampton				3,019	25.98	3rd
Sault Ste. Marie	Don Burgess				11,660	33.56	2nd
Sudbury	Bud Germa	Member of Provincial Parliament for Sudbury (1971–1981); Member of Parliament for Sudbury (1967–1968)			11,117	41.62	1st
Sudbury East	Elie Martel	Member of Provincial Parliament for Sudbury East (1967–1987)	Sudbury	Teacher	15,991	55.19	1st
Timiskaming	Robert Bain			Small business owner	8,914	44.63	1st

== Southwestern Ontario ==
Riding	Candidate's Name	Notes	Residence	Occupation	Votes	%	Rank
Brant—Oxford—Norfolk	Jim Schneider				4,760	19.17	3rd
Brantford	Mac Makarchuk	Member of Provincial Parliament for Brantford (1967–1971)	Brantford	Journalist	13,376	46.79	1st
Cambridge	Monty Davidson			Union leader (Textile Workers Union of America)	11,120	37.31	1st
Chatham—Kent	Ron Franko				6,482	27.96	2nd
Essex North	Dave Bradley				4,964	25.92	2nd
Essex South	Dan Lauzon				5,340	21.75	3rd
Grey	Walter Miller				4,210	15.92	3rd
Grey–Bruce	Bill Proud				2,477	9.27	3rd
Haldimand—Norfolk	Norm Walpole				4,257	13.56	3rd
Huron—Bruce	David Zyluk				1,754	6.59	3rd
Huron—Middlesex	Shirley Weary				1,405	6.10	3rd
Kent—Elgin	Ed Cutler				2,521	11.48	3rd
Kitchener	Cam Conrad				6,264	22.61	3rd
Kitchener—Wilmot	Jo Surich				5,456	22.38	3rd
Lambton	Cliff Swanstrom				1,702	7.72	3rd
London Centre	Stu Ross				6,279	22.26	3rd
London North	David Cunningham				6,130	19.16	3rd
London South	Tom Olien				7,964	21.08	3rd
Middlesex	Gordon Hill				4,998	20.71	3rd
Oxford	Mike Casselman				4,420	12.69	3rd
Perth	Carson McLauchlan				2,167	8.20	3rd
Sarnia	Wallace Krawczyk				6,770	22.94	3rd
Waterloo North	Mary-Jane Mewhinney				2,809	11.52	3rd
Wellington—Dufferin—Peel	Marion Chambers				7,235	23.24	3rd
Wellington South	Carl Hamilton				7,886	24.57	2nd
Windsor—Riverside	Dave Cooke			Teacher	12,947	45.59	1st
Windsor—Sandwich	Ted Bounsall	Member of Provincial Parliament for Windsor West (1971–1975)	Windsor	Professor at the University of Windsor	9,711	51.36	1st
Windsor—Walkerville	Len Wallace				4,565	21.57	3rd
