= 26th Parliament of Ontario =

1959–1963 legislature of Ontario, Canada

The 26th Legislative Assembly of Ontario was in session from June 11, 1959, until August 16, 1963, just prior to the 1963 general election. The majority party was the Ontario Progressive Conservative Party led by Leslie Frost.

John Robarts replaced Frost as Progressive Conservative Party leader and Premier in November 1961. William Murdoch served as speaker for the assembly.

== Members elected to the Assembly ==
Riding	Member	Party	First elected / previously elected	No. of terms	Notes
Algoma—Manitoulin	John Arthur Fullerton	Progressive Conservative	1945	5th term	
Beaches	William Henry Collings	Progressive Conservative	1951	3rd term	
Beaches	Robert John Harris (1962)	Progressive Conservative	1962	1st term	
Bellwoods	John Yaremko	Progressive Conservative	1951	3rd term	
Bracondale	Joseph M. Gould	Liberal	1959	1st term	
Brant	Harry Corwin Nixon	Liberal	1919	12th term	Died in 1961
Brant	Robert Fletcher Nixon (1962)	Liberal	1962	1st term	
Brantford	George Thomas Gordon	Liberal	1948	4th term	
Bruce	Ross MacKenzie Whicher	Liberal	1955	2nd term	
Carleton	William Erskine Johnston	Progressive Conservative	1955	2nd term	
Cochrane North	René Brunelle	Progressive Conservative	1958	2nd term	
Cochrane South	Wilf Spooner	Progressive Conservative	1955	2nd term	
Dovercourt	Andy Thompson	Liberal	1959	1st term	
Dufferin—Simcoe	Alfred Wallace Downer	Progressive Conservative	1937	7th term	
Durham	Hugh Alex Carruthers	Progressive Conservative	1959	1st term	
Eglinton	William James Dunlop	Progressive Conservative	1951	3rd term	
Eglinton	Leonard Mackenzie Reilly (1962)	Progressive Conservative	1962	1st term	
Elgin	Ronald Keith McNeil	Progressive Conservative	1958	2nd term	
Essex North	Arthur John Reaume	Liberal	1951	3rd term	
Essex South	William Murdoch	Progressive Conservative	1943	6th term	
Fort William	John Boyle Chapple	Liberal	1959	1st term	
Frontenac—Addington	John Richard Simonett	Progressive Conservative	1959	1st term	
Glengarry	Fernand Guindon	Progressive Conservative	1957	2nd term	
Grenville—Dundas	Frederick McIntosh Cass	Progressive Conservative	1955	2nd term	
Grey North	Mackinnon Phillips	Progressive Conservative	1945	5th term	
Grey South	Farquhar Robert Oliver	Liberal	1926 (Note: First elected as United Farmers)	10th term	
Haldimand—Norfolk	James Noble Allan	Progressive Conservative	1951	3rd term	
Halton	Stanley Leroy Hall	Progressive Conservative	1943	6th term	Died in 1962
Hamilton Centre	William Kenneth Warrender	Progressive Conservative	1951	3rd term	
Hamilton East	Norman Andrew Davison	Co-operative Commonwealth	1959	1st term	
Hamilton East	Norman Andrew Davison	New Democratic Party	1959	1st term	
Hamilton—Wentworth	Thomas Ray Connell	Progressive Conservative	1951	3rd term	
Hastings East	Clarke Rollins	Progressive Conservative	1959	1st term	
Hastings West	Elmer Sandercock	Progressive Conservative	1948	4th term	
High Park	Alfred Hozack Cowling	Progressive Conservative	1951	3rd term	
Huron	Charles Steel MacNaughton	Progressive Conservative	1958	2nd term	
Huron—Bruce	John William Hanna	Progressive Conservative	1943	6th term	Died in 1962
Huron—Bruce	Murray Gaunt (1962)	Liberal	1962	1st term	
Kenora	Albert Wren	Liberal-Labour	1951	3rd term	Died in 1961
Kenora	Robert Wayne Gibson (1962)	Liberal-Labour	1962	1st term	
Kent East	John Purvis Spence	Liberal	1955	2nd term	
Kent West	George William Parry	Progressive Conservative	1945	5th term	
Kingston	William McAdam Nickle	Progressive Conservative	1951	3rd term	
Lambton East	Charles Eusibius Janes	Progressive Conservative	1945	5th term	
Lambton West	Bryan Lewis Cathcart	Progressive Conservative	1945	5th term	
Lanark	George Ellis Gomme	Progressive Conservative	1958	2nd term	
Leeds	James Auld	Progressive Conservative	1954	3rd term	
Lincoln	Charles Daley	Progressive Conservative	1943	6th term	
London North	John Parmenter Robarts	Progressive Conservative	1951	3rd term	
London South	John Howard White	Progressive Conservative	1959	1st term	
Middlesex North	William Atcheson Stewart	Progressive Conservative	1957	2nd term	
Middlesex South	Harry Marshall Allen	Progressive Conservative	1945	5th term	
Muskoka	Robert James Boyer	Progressive Conservative	1955	2nd term	
Niagara Falls	George Bukator	Liberal	1959	1st term	
Nickel Belt	Rhéal Bélisle	Progressive Conservative	1955	2nd term	
Nipissing	Martin Leo Troy	Liberal	1959	1st term	
Northumberland	William Arthur Goodfellow	Progressive Conservative	1943	6th term	
Ontario	Matthew Bulloch Dymond	Progressive Conservative	1955	2nd term	
Oshawa	T.D. Thomas	Co-operative Commonwealth	1948	4th term	
Oshawa	T.D. Thomas	New Democratic Party	1948	4th term	
Ottawa East	Jules Morin	Progressive Conservative	1955	2nd term	
Ottawa South	Irwin Haskett	Progressive Conservative	1959	1st term	
Ottawa West	Donald Hugo Morrow	Progressive Conservative	1948	4th term	
Oxford	Gordon William Innes	Liberal	1955	2nd term	
Parkdale	James Beecham Trotter	Liberal	1959	1st term	
Parry Sound	Allister Johnston	Progressive Conservative	1948	4th term	
Peel	William Grenville Davis	Progressive Conservative	1959	1st term	
Perth	James Frederick Edwards	Progressive Conservative	1945	5th term	
Peterborough	Keith Roy Brown	Progressive Conservative	1959	1st term	
Port Arthur	George Calvin Wardrope	Progressive Conservative	1951	3rd term	
Prescott	Louis-Pierre Cécile	Progressive Conservative	1948	4th term	
Prince Edward—Lennox	Norris Eldon Howe Whitney	Progressive Conservative	1951	3rd term	
Rainy River	William George Noden	Progressive Conservative	1951	3rd term	
Renfrew North	Maurice Hamilton	Progressive Conservative	1958	2nd term	
Renfrew South	James Anthony Maloney	Progressive Conservative	1956	2nd term	
Renfrew South	Leonard Joseph Quilty (1962)	Liberal	1962	1st term	
Riverdale	Robert William Macaulay	Progressive Conservative	1951	3rd term	
Russell	Gordon Lavergne	Progressive Conservative	1954	3rd term	
Sault Ste. Marie	Harry Lyons	Progressive Conservative	1951	3rd term	Died in 1962
Simcoe Centre	George Graham Johnston	Progressive Conservative	1943	6th term	
Simcoe Centre	David Arthur Evans (1960)	Progressive Conservative	1960	1st term	
Simcoe East	Lloyd Averall Letherby	Progressive Conservative	1954	3rd term	
St. Andrew	Allan Grossman	Progressive Conservative	1955	2nd term	
St. David	Henry James Price	Progressive Conservative	1955	2nd term	
St. George	Allan Frederick Lawrence	Progressive Conservative	1958	2nd term	
St. Patrick	Archibald Kelso Roberts	Progressive Conservative	1943, 1951	5th term*	
Stormont	Peter Thomas Manley	Liberal	1951	3rd term	
Sudbury	Elmer Walter Sopha	Liberal	1959	1st term	
Timiskaming	Alexander Robert Herbert	Progressive Conservative	1951	3rd term	
Timiskaming	Phillip Hoffman (1960)	Progressive Conservative	1960	1st term	
Victoria	Leslie Miscampbell Frost	Progressive Conservative	1937	7th term	
Waterloo North	John Joseph Wintermeyer	Liberal	1955	2nd term	
Waterloo South	Raymond Munro Myers	Progressive Conservative	1951	3rd term	
Welland	Ellis Price Morningstar	Progressive Conservative	1951	3rd term	
Wellington South	Harry A. Worton	Liberal	1955	2nd term	
Wellington—Dufferin	John Henry Haines Root	Progressive Conservative	1951	3rd term	
Wentworth	Raymond Clare Edwards	Liberal	1959	1st term	
Wentworth East	Reg Gisborn	Co-operative Commonwealth	1955	2nd term	
Wentworth East	Reg Gisborn	New Democratic Party	1955	2nd term	
Windsor—Sandwich	Maurice Lucien Bélanger	Liberal	1959	1st term	
Windsor—Walkerville	Bernard Newman	Liberal	1959	1st term	
Woodbine	Kenneth Bryden	Co-operative Commonwealth	1959	1st term	
Woodbine	Kenneth Bryden	New Democratic Party	1959	1st term	
York Centre	Vernon Milton Singer	Liberal	1959	1st term	
York East	Hollis Edward Beckett	Progressive Conservative	1951	3rd term	
York North	Addison Alexander MacKenzie	Progressive Conservative	1945	5th term	
York South	Donald Cameron MacDonald	Co-operative Commonwealth	1955	2nd term	
York South	Donald Cameron MacDonald	New Democratic Party	1955	2nd term	
York West	Leslie Rowntree	Progressive Conservative	1956	2nd term	
York—Humber	William Beverley Lewis	Progressive Conservative	1955	2nd term	
York—Scarborough	Richard Edward Sutton	Progressive Conservative	1955	2nd term	
