= Gilles Pouliot =

Canadian politician

The Honourable Gilles Pouliot ECO

Ontario MPP
- In office 1985–1999
- Preceded by: Jack Stokes
- Succeeded by: Riding abolished
- Constituency: Lake Nipigon

More...

Personal details
- Born: May 25, 1942 (age 83) Montreal, Quebec
- Party: New Democrat
- Occupation: Miner, tradesman

Gilles Pouliot (born May 25, 1942) is a former politician in Ontario, Canada. He served as a member of the Legislative Assembly of Ontario from 1985 to 1999, representing the Northern Ontario riding of Lake Nipigon for the New Democratic Party.

== Background ==
Pouliot was born in Montreal, Quebec. He served as reeve for the Township of Manitouwadge for six years. He also worked as a flotation operator for Noranda Mines. He lived in Manitouwadge during his time in office.

== Politics ==
He was elected in the 1985 provincial election, defeating Progressive Conservative candidate Jim Files by over 1,200 votes. He was re-elected by greater margins in the provincial elections of 1987 and 1990. He supported Dave Barrett for the leadership of the federal New Democratic Party in 1989.

=== Government ===
The NDP won a majority government in the 1990 election, and Pouliot was named as Minister of Mines and Minister responsible for Francophone Affairs in Bob Rae's government on October 1, 1990. In early 1991, he introduced legislation forcing mining companies to renew their claims or risk losing them.

He retained responsibility for Francophone Affairs throughout the Rae government. On July 31, 1991, he was transferred from Mines to the Ministry of Transportation. On October 21, 1994, near the end of the Rae government's time in office, he was shifted back to Northern Development and Mines.

=== Cabinet positions ===
Rae ministry, Province of Ontario (1990–1995)
Cabinet posts (3)
Predecessor	Office	Successor
Shelley Martel	Minister of Northern Development and Mines; 1994–1995; Also Responsible for Francophone Affairs	Chris Hodgson
Ed Philip	Minister of Transportation; 1991–1994; Also Responsible for Francophone Affairs	Mike Farnan
Hugh O'Neil	Minister of Mines; 1990–1991; Also Responsible for Francophone Affairs	Shelley Martel

=== Opposition ===
The NDP were defeated in the 1995 election, although Pouliot retained the Lake Nipigon riding without too much difficulty. In 1996, he supported Howard Hampton's successful campaign to replace Rae as party leader.

Pouliot's riding was eliminated by redistribution in 1996. He rarely spoke in the legislature thereafter, and he chose not to run again in the 1999 election.
