= John Rowlandson =

Canadian politician

Ontario MPP
- In office 1934–1937
- Preceded by: Alfred Franklin Kenning
- Succeeded by: Charles Vincent Gallagher
- Constituency: Cochrane South

Personal details
- Born: September 3, 1876 Kendal, England
- Died: 1947 (aged 70–71)
- Party: Liberal
- Spouse: Mary Isabelle Smith (m. 1889)
- Occupation: Merchant

John Rowlandson (September 3, 1876 – 1947) was an English-born merchant and politician in Ontario, Canada. He represented Cochrane South in the Legislative Assembly of Ontario from 1934 to 1937 as a Liberal.

The son of James Rowlandson and Sarah Mitchell, he was born in Kendal, came to Canada in 1883 and was educated in Nipissing. In 1889, Rowlandson married Mary Isabelle Smith. He was employed in the plywood and lumber business for 20 years. He also served on the local public school board.

Rowlandson defeated Conservative incumbent Alfred Franklin Kenning to win a seat in the Ontario assembly in 1934. At his urging, the Ontario government initiated a commission to investigate the operation of the Northern Development Branch, which had been created to construct colonization roads to connect the region with the Temiskaming and Northern Ontario Railway.
