= Charles Gallagher (Ontario politician) =

Canadian politician from Ontario

Member of the Ontario Provincial Parliament for Cochrane South
- In office October 6, 1937 – May 28, 1940
- Preceded by: John Rowlandson
- Succeeded by: Bill Grummett

Personal details
- Born: Charles Vincent Gallagher
- Died: May 28, 1940
- Party: Liberal

Charles Vincent Gallagher (died May 28, 1940) was a Canadian politician who was a Liberal MPP for Cochrane South from 1937 to 1940.

== See also ==
- 20th Parliament of Ontario
