= Robert Herbert (Ontario politician) =

Canadian politician

A. Robert Herbert

MPP for Timiskaming
- In office 1951–1960
- Preceded by: Calvin Howard Taylor
- Succeeded by: Phillip Hoffman

Personal details
- Born: March 28, 1914 Haileybury, Ontario
- Died: June 18, 1960 (aged 46) Cobalt, Ontario
- Party: Ontario Progressive Conservative Party
- Occupation: businessman

Alexander Robert Herbert (March 28, 1914 – June 18, 1960) was a Canadian politician who was a Member of Provincial Parliament in Legislative Assembly of Ontario from 1951 to 1960. He represented the riding of Simcoe Centre for the Ontario Progressive Conservative Party. Born in Haileybury, Ontario, he was a businessman. Herbert died in office in 1960 of a heart attack.
