= Camilo Tiqui (candidate) =

Camilo Tiqui was a perennial candidate for public office in Toronto. He was an intelligence officer in the Philippine military, and moved to Canada in 1976. He later worked for De Havilland as an aircraft technologist. Tiqui was fifty-one years old in when he ran in Parkdale for the 1987 Ontario provincial election. He campaigned in favour of a more equitable system of taxation.

He tried to challenge Sergio Marchi for the Liberal nomination in York West in the 1988 federal election, but was ruled ineligible on the grounds that his nomination papers were misfiled.

Tiqui expressed concern about overpopulation in the Toronto's Black Creek area during the 1988 campaign. He called for increased multicultural programs in 1991. In addition to the campaigns listed below, Tiqui also applied to become Mario Gentile's replacement on the Metro Toronto Council in 1994 (council chose to appoint Gentile's successor rather than call a by-election). He was rejected in favour of another candidate.

Tiqui is active with the Boy Scouts organization.

Electoral record
Election	Division	Party	Votes	%	Place	Winner
12 November 1984 North York municipal by-election	Council, Ward One	n/a	not listed		not listed	Mario Sergio
1985 North York municipal	School trustee, Ward Three	n/a	155		4/4	Elizabeth Smith
1987 provincial	Parkdale	Independent	176		7/8	Tony Ruprecht, Liberal
1988 Toronto municipal	Metro council, Black Creek ward	n/a	1,117		3/3	Maria Augimeri
1991 North York municipal	School trustee, Ward One	n/a	239		3/4	Sheila Lambrinos
1994 Toronto municipal	Metro council, Black Creek ward	n/a	1,784		2/2	Maria Augimeri
