= Ed Havrot =

Canadian politician

Ontario MPP
- In office 1977–1985
- Preceded by: Robert Bain
- Succeeded by: David Ramsay
- In office 1971–1975
- Preceded by: Donald Jackson
- Succeeded by: Robert Bain
- Constituency: Timiskaming

Personal details
- Born: June 4, 1927; Poland
- Died: April 16, 2017 (aged 89); Kirkland Lake, Ontario
- Political party: Progressive Conservative
- Spouse: Gayle MacArthur
- Children: 4
- Occupation: Businessowner

Edward Michael Havrot (June 4, 1927 – April 16, 2017) was a politician in Ontario, Canada. He was a Progressive Conservative member of the Legislative Assembly of Ontario from 1971 to 1975 and from 1977 to 1985 who represented the northern Ontario riding of Timiskaming.

== Background ==
Born in Poland, Havrot moved to Ontario as a child and was educated in Kirkland Lake. He was a businessman before entering political life, and was active in the Royal Canadian Legion. He married Gayle MacArthur and together they raised four children.

== Politics ==
Havrot served on the Kirkland Lake council in 1966-67, and was elected as its reeve in 1970.

He was elected to the Ontario legislature in the 1971 provincial election, defeating a New Democratic Party (NDP) opponent by 2,154 votes in Timiskaming. He served as a backbench supporter for the next four years, and was named chair of the Ontario Northland Transportation and parliamentary assistant to Minister of Transportation John Rhodes.

Havrot was known for making politically incorrect remarks. In 1975, during a local dispute with aboriginal groups over land claims, he told a The Globe and Mail reporter than he could have bribed the area's chiefs with "a case of goof". He then added, "These damn Indians have gone absolutely wild... We should have given them a bunch of teepees and some cordwood and that's all". He was accused of racism, immediately lost both of his legislative appointments, and was forced to read a prepared apology in the legislature. He later tried to defend himself by saying, "Up North, if you say the wrong thing in the heat of the moment and offend somebody, you apologize and its over".

He was renominated for the 1975 provincial election, following a nomination speech in which he described The Globe and Mail article as the "lowest form of cheap journalism". He lost the election, falling to NDP candidate Bob Bain by 1,544 votes.

Havrot returned to the legislature in 1977, defeating Bain by 664 votes. He once again served as a backbench supporter of the Davis government, though Davis refused to visit his riding association. In 1979, Havrot repeatedly interrupted a speech by New Democratic Party Member of Provincial Parliament (MPP) Tony Lupusella to yell, "This is the wop show", "mama mia" and "Atsa nice. Good for Benito Mussolini". He was again forced to read a prepared apology in the legislature.

After fending off a serious challenge for the PC nomination, he again defeated Bain in the 1981 provincial election.

Havrot was defeated for a second time in the 1985 election, losing to New Democrat David Ramsay by 2,824 votes. He sought a return to the legislature in 1987, and this time finished a distant third against Ramsay. Havrot also ran for mayor of Kirkland Lake in 1988, but lost to incumbent Joe Mavrinac. He died in Kirkland Lake on April 16, 2017.
