= Bill Grummett =

Canadian politician

Ontario MPP
- In office 1943–1955
- Preceded by: Charles Vincent Gallagher
- Succeeded by: Wilf Spooner
- Constituency: Cochrane South

Personal details
- Born: January 8, 1891 Osprey Township, Ontario
- Died: July 1, 1967 (aged 76) Orangeville, Ontario
- Party: Ontario CCF
- Spouse: Marie
- Children: 5
- Occupation: Lawyer

William John Grummett (January 8, 1891 – 1967) was a Canadian politician. He represented the electoral district of Cochrane South in the Legislative Assembly of Ontario from 1943 to 1955 as a member of the Co-operative Commonwealth Federation (CCF).

== Background ==
The son of a farmer in Maxwell, Ontario, just south of Collingwood, Grummett was the first lawyer in Iroquois Falls-Ansonville, having attended law school in Toronto, Ontario. He and his wife Marie raised their five children in Iroquois Falls, Ontario.

He had fought in World War I as an officer in the British Army where he saw action in the Mesopotamian campaign. While there, he contracted malaria which affected him for the rest of his life. He died in 1967.

== Politics ==
In the 1943 provincial election he ran as the Co-operative Commonwealth Federation candidate in the riding of Cochrane South. he defeated Liberal candidate J. Emile Brunette by 5066 votes. He was the only CCF MPP to survive both the 1945 and the 1951 provincial elections, which saw most CCFers defeated, including party leader Ted Jolliffe.

He was the CCF's House Leader and led the two person caucus in the legislature from 1951, following Jolliffe's defeat, until new leader Donald C. Macdonald entered the legislature in the 1955.

Grummett was defeated in the 1955 general election by Ontario Progressive Conservative Party candidate Wilf Spooner, who was mayor of Timmins, Ontario, when the Liberals failed to field a candidate allowing "old party votes" to coalesce around Spooner.
