= Alfred Franklin Kenning =

Canadian politician (1885–1938)

Ontario MPP
- In office 1926–1934
- Preceded by: New riding
- Succeeded by: John Rowlandson
- Constituency: Cochrane South

Personal details
- Born: June 3, 1885 Pembroke, Ontario
- Died: October 22, 1938 (aged 53) Winona, Ontario
- Party: Conservative

Alfred Franklin Kenning (June 3, 1885 – October 22, 1938) was a lumberman and political figure in Ontario. He represented Cochrane South in the Legislative Assembly of Ontario from 1926 to 1934 as a Conservative member.

He was born in Pembroke, Ontario, the son of Richard W. Kenning and Charlotte Gibson, and was educated there. Kenning served in the Canadian Machine Gun Corps and the British infantry during World War I, reaching the rank of lieutenant. In 1921, he married Craig Hoggarth. He died at his home in 1938 after a brief illness.
