= Donald Jackson (Canadian politician) =

Canadian politician (born 1930)

MPP for Timiskaming
- In office October 17, 1967 – October 20, 1971
- Preceded by: Richard Taylor
- Succeeded by: Ed Havrot

Personal details
- Born: June 23, 1930 (age 95) Shannonville, Ontario
- Party: NDP

Donald Earl Jackson (born June 23, 1930) is a former Canadian politician, who represented the electoral district of Timiskaming in the Legislative Assembly of Ontario from 1967 to 1971. He was a member of the Ontario New Democratic Party. After winning in the general election, in 1967, Jackson served one term, losing to the PC candidate Ed Havrot. As an opposition member, Jackson served on a variety of Standing Committees, particularly those, like the Standing Committee on Natural Resources, Wildlife and Mining, with particular significance to his riding in northern Ontario. He was born in Shannonville, Ontario.
