= Lloyd Fell =

Canadian politician

Member of the Ontario Provincial Parliament for Parkdale
- In office June 7, 1948 – October 6, 1951
- Preceded by: William James Stewart
- Succeeded by: William James Stewart

Personal details
- Born: 1920
- Died: 1981 (aged 60 or 61)
- Party: Co-operative Commonwealth

Lloyd F. K. Fell (1920–1981) was a Canadian politician in Ontario, trade unionist, and educator on the subject of alcoholism.

== Early life ==
Fell was born in Toronto and graduated from Central Technical School.

== Career ==
Fell worked as a diamond setter and jewelry engraver with a firm on Yonge Street and later worked for Swift Canadian Co. Ltd. as a shipper. During World War II he served in the Canadian Army, reaching the rank of sergeant.

Fell came to prominence in the 1948 Ontario general election when he was elected to the Ontario legislature as the Ontario Co-operative Commonwealth Federation MPP from the riding of Parkdale upsetting incumbent Conservative MPP William James Stewart, a former Mayor of Toronto and Speaker of the Ontario legislature, by a margin of 600 votes. Stewart regained his seat in the 1951 Ontario general election, defeating Fell, who ran again unsuccessfully in the 1955 Ontario general election.

Before his first election, Fell became a trade union official working as a staff representative with the United Packinghouse Workers of America, resuming that position after his defeat. He later served as a staff representative with the United Steelworkers and was also an official with the Ontario Federation of Labour. He served as national chairman of the political action committee of the Canadian Congress of Labour.

A recovering alcoholic, he became director of the Lifeline Foundation, a joint venture of steel companies and the United Steelworkers of America designed to help employees with alcohol and drug problems.

== See also ==
- 23rd Parliament of Ontario
