= Richard Taylor (Canadian politician) =

Canadian politician

Richard Allan Hugh Taylor

Ontario MPP
- In office 1963–1967
- Preceded by: Phillip Hoffman
- Succeeded by: Donald Jackson
- Constituency: Timiskaming

Personal details
- Born: January 13, 1915; New Liskeard, Ontario
- Died: April 7, 1991 (aged 76); Bermuda
- Political party: Liberal Party of Ontario
- Occupation: Businessman

Richard Allan Hugh Taylor (January 13, 1915 – April 7, 1991) was a Canadian politician, who represented Timiskaming in the Legislative Assembly of Ontario from 1963 to 1967 as a Liberal member.

== Background ==
Prior to his election, he led George Taylor Hardware Limited, one of the largest post-war wholesale hardware enterprises in Canada supplying the expanding mining and forestry industries across northern Ontario and Quebec. He served on boards of numerous northern mining and business ventures. He was also actively involved in the expansion of telecommunication services throughout northeastern Ontario. During the war he served as a "dollar a day" professional as director and administrator for the Non-Ferrous Metal and Fabricated Steel group of the national Wartime Prices and Trade Board. Taylor served as a trustee on the local school board and he was a director on the Board of Temiskaming Hospital in New Liskeard, Ontario. He was a highly respected, generous community man who was always seeking opportunities for his community and the North.

Despite having polio as a young boy, he recovered and went on to be an accomplished athlete in a number of fields, most particularly running where he won awards at the high school and varsity levels.

Taylor died on vacation in Bermuda in 1991.

== Politics ==
Taylor was elected in the provincial general election in 1963 and he served as a backbench member of the Opposition in the 27th Legislative Assembly of Ontario during a majority PC government led by Premier John Robarts. Taylor served on three Standing Committees of the Legislative Assembly, during his time in office, with a particular interest in Committees dealing with "Natural Resources, Wildlife and Mining" and "Highways and Transport."
