= Thomas Magladery =

Canadian politician

Captain Thomas Magladery

MPP for Timiskaming
- In office June 29, 1914 – May 10, 1923

Personal details
- Born: December 14, 1875 Parkhill, Middlesex County, Ontario
- Died: October 29, 1954 (aged 78) New Liskeard, Ontario
- Party: Progressive Conservative Party of Ontario

Thomas Magladery (December 14, 1875 – October 29, 1954) was a merchant and political figure in Ontario. He represented Timiskaming in the Legislative Assembly of Ontario from 1914 to 1923 as a Conservative member.

The son of Thomas Magladery and Jessie Rennie, he was born in Parkhill, Middlesex County. Magladery served in the Canadian infantry during World War I, reaching the rank of captain. In 1910, he married Lillian Howson. Magladery was named Deputy Minister of Immigration in 1934. He died in New Liskeard, October 29, 1954, and was buried at the Pioneer Cemetery at that same city.
