= Phillip Hoffman (Ontario politician) =

Canadian politician (1901–1980)

Philip Hoffman

MPP for Timiskaming
- In office 1960–1963
- Preceded by: A. Robert Herbert
- Succeeded by: Richard Taylor

Personal details
- Born: March 31, 1901 Lount Township, Ontario
- Died: December 22, 1980 (aged 79) Ontario, Canada
- Party: Ontario Progressive Conservative Party
- Occupation: Chief Forest Ranger

Philip Hoffman (March 31, 1901 – December 22, 1980) was a Canadian politician who was a Member of Provincial Parliament in Legislative Assembly of Ontario from 1960 to 1963. He represented the riding of Timiskaming for the Ontario Progressive Conservative Party. Born in Lount Township, Ontario, he was a forest ranger.
