= James Trotter (Ontario politician) =

Canadian politician

Jim Trotter

Ontario MPP
- In office 1959–1971
- Preceded by: William James Stewart
- Succeeded by: Jan Dukszta
- Constituency: Parkdale

Personal details
- Born: March 23, 1923 Brandon, Manitoba
- Died: June 1, 1989 (aged 66) Toronto, Ontario
- Party: Liberal
- Spouse: Grace
- Children: 3
- Occupation: Judge, lawyer

Military service
- Allegiance: Canadian
- Branch/service: Royal Canadian Air Force
- Years of service: 1940–1945

James Beecham Trotter (March 23, 1923 – June 1, 1989) was a politician in Ontario, Canada. He was a Liberal member of the Legislative Assembly of Ontario from 1959 to 1971 who represented the riding of Parkdale.

== Background ==
Trotter was born in Brandon, Manitoba in 1923. He was educated at the University of Manitoba and obtained his law degree at the Osgoode Hall Law School. He was called to the bar in 1950. He served in the Royal Canadian Air Force during World War II and saw service in the European theatre. He was appointed to the County Court in 1975 where he served as an Ontario District Court Judge.

Trotter was married to Grace and they had three children.

== Politics ==
Trotter ran as the Liberal candidate in the Toronto riding of Parkdale in the 1959 provincial election. He defeated Progressive Conservative incumbent W.J. Stewart by 2,919 votes. He was re-elected in 1963 and 1967. During the 28th Legislative Assembly of Ontario he served on an average of eight Standing Committees of the Legislative Assembly during each legislative term, with a particular interest in legal, labour, welfare and education issues. Trotter lost, in the 1971 general election, to the NDP candidate, Jan Dukszta.
