= Calvin Howard Taylor =

Canadian politician

MPP for Timiskaming
- In office 1943–1951

Personal details
- Born: March 14, 1896 Madawaska, Ontario, Canada
- Died: November 10, 1976 (aged 80)
- Party: Co-operative Commonwealth Federation
- Spouse: Catherine Hamilton
- Occupation: politician
- Profession: chief clerk, Temiskaming and Northern Ontario Railway
- Known for: Mayor of Cobalt (4 years)

Calvin Howard Taylor (March 14, 1896 – November 10, 1976) was a politician in Ontario, Canada. He represented Timiskaming in the Legislative Assembly of Ontario from 1943 to 1951 as a Co-operative Commonwealth Federation (CCF) member.

The son of John Taylor and Elizabeth Payne, he was born in Madawaska and was educated there and in Renfrew. In 1917, Taylor married Catherine Hamilton. He was chief clerk for the Temiskaming and Northern Ontario Railway. Taylor was mayor of Cobalt for four years.
