= Timiskaming (provincial electoral district) =

Former provincial electoral district in Ontario, Canada

Ontario electoral district

Defunct provincial electoral district
- Legislature: Legislative Assembly of Ontario
- District created: 1908
- District abolished: 1999
- First contested: 1908
- Last contested: 1995

Demographics
- Census division: Timiskaming District
- Census subdivision(s): Cobalt, Haileybury, Kirkland Lake, New Liskeard

Timiskaming was a provincial electoral district in Ontario, Canada, that was represented in the Legislative Assembly of Ontario from 1908 to 1999. It encompassed most of the Timiskaming District.

For the 1999 election, in which all electoral districts in the province were realigned to match their federal counterparts, Timiskaming was merged with part of Cochrane South into the new district of Timiskaming—Cochrane.

== Representation ==
This riding has elected the following members of the Legislative Assembly of Ontario:

Parliament	Years	Member	Party
12th	1908–1911	Robert Taylor Shillington	Conservative
13th	1911–1914	Robert Taylor Shillington	Conservative
14th	1914–1919	Thomas Magladery	Conservative
15th	1919–1923	Thomas Magladery	Conservative
16th	1923–1926	Angus John Kennedy	Conservative
17th	1926–1929	Angus John Kennedy	Conservative
18th	1929–1934	Angus John Kennedy	Conservative
19th	1934–1937	William Glennie Nixon	Liberal
20th	1937–1943	William Glennie Nixon	Liberal
21st	1943–1945	Calvin Howard Taylor	CCF
22nd	1945–1948	Calvin Howard Taylor	CCF
23rd	1948–1951	Calvin Howard Taylor	CCF
24th	1951–1955	Alexander Robert Herbert	Progressive Conservative
25th	1955–1959	Alexander Robert Herbert	Progressive Conservative
26th	1959–1960	Alexander Robert Herbert	Progressive Conservative
26th	1960–1963	Phillip Hoffman	Progressive Conservative
27th	1963–1967	Richard Allan Hugh Taylor	Liberal
28th	1967–1971	Donald Jackson	New Democrat
29th	1971–1975	Ed Havrot	Progressive Conservative
30th	1975–1977	Robert Bain	New Democrat
31st	1977–1981	Ed Havrot	Progressive Conservative
32nd	1981–1985	Ed Havrot	Progressive Conservative
33rd	1985–1986	David Ramsay	New Democrat
33rd	1986–1987	David Ramsay	Liberal
34th	1987–1990	David Ramsay	Liberal
35th	1990–1995	David Ramsay	Liberal
36th	1995–1999	David Ramsay	Liberal

== Election results ==
1995 Ontario general election
Party	Candidate	Votes	%	±%
Liberal	David Ramsay	8,643	46.78	+4.49
Progressive Conservative	Ian MacPherson	6,185	33.48	+22.05
New Democratic	Ambrose Raftis	2,962	16.03	–15.27
Confederation of Regions	Alph Schaffner	685	3.71	–7.67
Total valid votes		18,475	99.22	
Total rejected, unmarked and declined ballots		146	0.78	+0.09
Turnout		18,621	64.13	–3.44
Eligible voters		29,037		
Liberal hold		Swing		–8.78
Source: Elections Ontario

1990 Ontario general election
Party	Candidate	Votes	%	±%
Liberal	David Ramsay	8,364	42.29	–6.58
New Democratic	Michelle Evans	6,191	31.30	+3.22
Progressive Conservative	Garfield Pinkerton	2,261	11.43	–11.62
Confederation of Regions	James H. Fawcett	2,250	11.38	–
Green	Doug Fraser	713	3.60	–
Total valid votes		19,779	99.31	
Total rejected, unmarked and declined ballots		138	0.69	+0.36
Turnout		19,917	67.57	–2.35
Eligible voters		29,477		
Liberal hold		Swing		–4.90
Source: Elections Ontario

1987 Ontario general election
Party	Candidate	Votes	%	±%
Liberal	David Ramsay	10,218	48.87	+39.31
New Democratic	Ollie Rivard	5,871	28.08	–22.71
Progressive Conservative	Ed Havrot	4,820	23.05	–14.41
Total valid votes		20,909	99.67	
Total rejected ballots		69	0.33	+0.00
Turnout		20,978	69.92	–1.15
Eligible voters		30,004		
Liberal gain from New Democratic		Swing		+26.86
Source: Elections Ontario

1985 Ontario general election
Party	Candidate	Votes	%	±%
New Democratic	David Ramsay	10,765	50.79	+14.67
Progressive Conservative	Ed Havrot	7,941	37.46	–7.24
Liberal	Dale M. Woods	2,026	9.56	–9.62
Independent	George Herbert Yeates	464	2.19	–
Total valid votes		21,196	99.68	
Total rejected ballots		69	0.32	+0.01
Turnout		21,265	71.07	+6.10
Eligible voters		29,922		
New Democratic gain from Progressive Conservative		Swing		+10.96
Source: Elections Ontario

1981 Ontario general election
Party	Candidate	Votes	%	±%
Progressive Conservative	Ed Havrot	8,377	44.71	–3.25
New Democratic	Robert Bain	6,768	36.12	–8.51
Liberal	Leo St. Cyr	3,593	19.17	+11.76
Total valid votes		18,738	99.69	
Total rejected ballots		59	0.31	–0.08
Turnout		18,797	64.97	–4.43
Eligible voters		28,932		
Progressive Conservative hold		Swing		+2.63
Source: Elections Ontario

1977 Ontario general election
Party	Candidate	Votes	%	±%
Progressive Conservative	Ed Havrot	9,578	47.95	+11.70
New Democratic	Robert Bain	8,914	44.63	+0.57
Liberal	Dan J. Casey	1,481	7.42	–10.52
Total valid votes		19,973	99.61	
Total rejected ballots		78	0.39	+0.02
Turnout		20,051	69.40	+0.97
Eligible voters		28,892		
Progressive Conservative gain from New Democratic		Swing		+5.57
Source: Elections Ontario

1975 Ontario general election
Party	Candidate	Votes	%	±%
New Democratic	Robert Bain	8,713	44.07	+7.34
Progressive Conservative	Ed Havrot	7,169	36.26	–10.96
Liberal	Howie Parker	3,546	17.93	+1.88
Independent	Ron Romanow	175	0.89	–
Social Credit	Clément-G. Larochelle	170	0.86	–
Total valid votes		19,773	99.63	
Total rejected ballots		73	0.37	–0.17
Turnout		19,846	68.43	–6.45
Eligible voters		29,002		
New Democratic gain from Progressive Conservative		Swing		+9.15
Source: Elections Ontario

1971 Ontario general election
Party	Candidate	Votes	%	±%
Progressive Conservative	Ed Havrot	9,695	47.22	+7.00
New Democratic	Donald Jackson	7,541	36.73	–5.16
Liberal	George Morissette	3,297	16.06	–1.84
Total valid votes		20,533	99.47	
Total rejected ballots		110	0.53	+0.02
Turnout		20,643	74.88	+2.13
Eligible voters		27,567		
Progressive Conservative gain from New Democratic		Swing		+6.08
Source: Elections Ontario

1967 Ontario general election
Party	Candidate	Votes	%	±%
New Democratic	Donald Jackson	7,328	41.89	+20.07
Progressive Conservative	Joseph Mavrinac	7,035	40.21	+2.45
Liberal	R. Dionne	3,131	17.90	–22.51
Total valid votes		17,494	99.48	
Total rejected ballots		91	0.52	+0.09
Turnout		17,585	72.75	+3.31
Eligible voters		24,171		
New Democratic gain from Liberal		Swing		+8.81
Source: Elections Ontario

1963 Ontario general election
Party	Candidate	Votes	%	±%
Liberal	Richard Taylor	4,124	40.41	+9.92
Progressive Conservative	Phil Hoffman	3,854	37.77	–3.34
New Democratic	Jack Laforge	2,227	21.82	–6.57
Total valid votes		10,205	99.57	
Total rejected ballots		44	0.43	–0.30
Turnout		10,249	69.45	–6.44
Eligible voters		14,758		
Liberal gain from Progressive Conservative		Swing		+6.63
Source: Elections Ontario

Ontario provincial by-election, September 29, 1960 Death of Robert Herbert
Party	Candidate	Votes	%	±%
Progressive Conservative	Phillip Hoffman	4,725	42.56	+1.45
Liberal	Harvey Plaunt	3,844	34.62	+4.12
Co-operative Commonwealth	Calvin Howard Taylor	2,533	22.82	–5.58
Total valid votes		11,102	99.24	
Total rejected ballots		85	0.76	–
Turnout		11,187	78.54	–
Eligible voters		14,244		
Progressive Conservative hold		Swing		–1.34
Source: Elections Ontario

1959 Ontario general election
Party	Candidate	Votes	%	±%
Progressive Conservative	Robert Herbert	4,327	41.11	–19.14
Liberal	Harvey Plaunt	3,210	30.50	–
Co-operative Commonwealth	Clayton Johnston	2,989	28.40	–11.36
Total valid votes		10,526	99.27	
Total rejected ballots		77	0.73	–0.61
Turnout		10,603	75.88	+2.25
Eligible voters		13,973		
Progressive Conservative hold		Swing		–9.57
Source: Elections Ontario

1955 Ontario general election
Party	Candidate	Votes	%	±%
Progressive Conservative	Robert Herbert	6,322	60.24	+20.72
Co-operative Commonwealth	C. C. Doc Ames	4,172	39.76	+6.29
Total valid votes		10,494	98.66	
Total rejected ballots		142	1.34	+0.71
Turnout		10,636	73.63	–0.08
Eligible voters		14,445		
Progressive Conservative hold		Swing		+7.22
Source: Elections Ontario

1951 Ontario general election
Party	Candidate	Votes	%	±%
Progressive Conservative	Robert Herbert	4,328	39.53	+2.91
Co-operative Commonwealth	Calvin Howard Taylor	3,665	33.47	–7.93
Liberal	W. R. Peters	2,957	27.00	+5.02
Total valid votes		10,950	99.37	
Total rejected ballots		69	0.63	+0.10
Turnout		11,019	73.71	–6.12
Eligible voters		14,949		
Progressive Conservative gain from Co-operative Commonwealth		Swing		+5.42
Source: Elections Ontario

1948 Ontario general election
Party	Candidate	Votes	%	±%
Co-operative Commonwealth	Calvin Howard Taylor	4,851	41.40	+1.74
Progressive Conservative	Robert Dean Cummings	4,290	36.61	+7.73
Liberal	Albert G. Galoska	2,576	21.99	–6.89
Total valid votes		11,717	99.47	
Total rejected ballots		62	0.53	–0.20
Turnout		11,779	79.83	+2.86
Eligible voters		14,755		
Co-operative Commonwealth hold		Swing		–3.00
Source: Elections Ontario

1945 Ontario general election
Party	Candidate	Votes	%	±%
Co-operative Commonwealth	Calvin Howard Taylor	4,327	39.66	–14.52
Progressive Conservative	Robert Dean Cummings	3,151	28.88	+12.64
Liberal	William Glennie Nixon	3,150	28.87	–0.70
Labor–Progressive	William S. Lewis	282	2.58	–
Total valid votes		10,910	99.27	
Total rejected ballots		80	0.73	+0.25
Turnout		10,990	76.97	+5.85
Eligible voters		14,278		
Co-operative Commonwealth hold		Swing		–13.58
Source: Elections Ontario

1943 Ontario general election
Party	Candidate	Votes	%	±%
Co-operative Commonwealth	Calvin Howard Taylor	5,219	54.18	+45.94
Liberal	William Glennie Nixon	2,849	29.58	–17.13
Progressive Conservative	Robert Dean Cummings	1,565	16.25	–28.81
Total valid votes		9,633	99.52	
Total rejected ballots		46	0.48	–0.25
Turnout		9,679	71.12	+0.00
Eligible voters		13,610		
Co-operative Commonwealth gain from Liberal		Swing		+37.37
Source: Elections Ontario

1937 Ontario general election
Party	Candidate	Votes	%	±%
Liberal	William Glennie Nixon	5,966	46.70	–1.78
Conservative	Thomas Magladery	5,756	45.06	+16.58
Co-operative Commonwealth	Frank Lendrum	1,053	8.24	–14.80
Total valid votes		12,775	99.28	
Total rejected ballots		93	0.72	–0.34
Turnout		12,868	71.11	–2.80
Eligible voters		18,095		
Liberal hold		Swing		–9.18
Source: Elections Ontario

1934 Ontario general election
Party	Candidate	Votes	%	±%
Liberal	William Glennie Nixon	5,573	48.48	+6.69
Conservative	Angus John Kennedy	3,273	28.47	–29.74
Co-operative Commonwealth	Walter John Hill	2,649	23.04	–
Total valid votes		11,495	98.94	
Total rejected ballots		123	1.06	+0.27
Turnout		11,618	73.92	+11.21
Eligible voters		15,718		
Liberal gain from Conservative		Swing		+18.22
Source: Elections Ontario

1929 Ontario general election
Party	Candidate	Votes	%	±%
Conservative	Angus John Kennedy	4,888	58.21	–5.58
Liberal	Charles Alson Byam	3,509	41.79	+5.58
Total valid votes		8,397	99.21	
Total rejected ballots		67	0.79	+0.31
Turnout		8,464	62.70	+17.35
Eligible voters		13,499		
Conservative hold		Swing		–5.58
Source: Elections Ontario

1926 Ontario general election
Party	Candidate	Votes	%	±%
Conservative	Angus John Kennedy	4,048	63.79	+19.67
Liberal–Labour	Robert Hugh McGowan	2,298	36.21	–
Total valid votes		6,346	99.51	
Total rejected ballots		31	0.49	–1.70
Turnout		6,377	45.36	–14.22
Eligible voters		14,060		
Conservative hold		Swing		+9.83
Source: Elections Ontario

1923 Ontario general election
Party	Candidate	Votes	%	±%
Conservative	Angus John Kennedy	3,160	44.12	+8.28
United Farmers	John Sharp	2,152	30.05	–
Liberal	Henry A. O'Grady	1,850	25.83	–3.38
Total valid votes		7,162	97.81	
Total rejected ballots		160	2.19	–0.73
Turnout		7,322	59.58	–9.12
Eligible voters		12,290		
Conservative hold		Swing		+4.14
Source: Elections Ontario

1919 Ontario general election
Party	Candidate	Votes	%	±%
Conservative	Thomas Magladery	3,092	35.84	–12.85
Labour-United Farmers	Alexander Montgomery	3,015	34.95	–
Liberal	Ralph Sedley Taylor	2,520	29.21	–6.96
Total valid votes		8,627	97.09	
Total rejected ballots		259	2.91	+1.91
Turnout		8,886	68.70	+18.10
Eligible voters		12,935		
Conservative hold		Swing		–6.43
Source: Elections Ontario

1914 Ontario general election
Party	Candidate	Votes	%	±%
Conservative	Thomas Magladery	2,838	48.70	–4.21
Liberal	Arthur Roebuck	2,108	36.17	–10.92
Independent	Thomas G. Mill	882	15.13	–
Total valid votes		5,828	99.00	
Total rejected ballots		59	1.00	–0.26
Turnout		5,887	50.60	+9.92
Eligible voters		11,634		
Conservative hold		Swing		+3.36
Source: Elections Ontario

1911 Ontario general election
Party	Candidate	Votes	%	±%
Conservative	Robert Taylor Shillington	2,403	52.91	–2.10
Liberal	Arthur Roebuck	2,139	47.09	+10.40
Total valid votes		4,542	98.74	
Total rejected ballots		58	1.26	+0.04
Turnout		4,600	40.68	–7.53
Eligible voters		11,307		
Conservative hold		Swing		–6.25
Source: Elections Ontario

1908 Ontario general election
Party	Candidate	Votes	%
Conservative	Robert Taylor Shillington	1,649	55.00
Liberal	Angus Alex McKelvie	1,100	36.69
Socialist	Arthur Lionel Botley	249	8.31
Total valid votes		2,998	98.78
Total rejected ballots		37	1.22
Turnout		3,035	48.21
Eligible voters		6,295	
Conservative pickup new district.			
Source: Elections Ontario

== See also ==
- List of Ontario provincial electoral districts
- Canadian provincial electoral districts
