= William Glennie Nixon =

Canadian politician

MPP for Timiskaming
- In office June 19, 1934 – June 30, 1943

Personal details
- Born: November 22, 1881 Sault Ste. Marie, Ontario
- Died: February 24, 1966 (aged 84) Ottawa, Ontario
- Party: Ontario Liberal Party

William Glennie Nixon (November 22, 1881 – February 24, 1966) was a farmer and political figure in Ontario. He represented Timiskaming in the Legislative Assembly of Ontario from 1934 to 1943 as a Liberal member.

He was born in Sault Ste. Marie in 1881, the son of William Charles Nixon and Margaret Jane Stephen, and was educated in Sault Ste. Marie and Guelph. In 1920, Nixon married Ethel Mary Pigott. Nixon later entered the insurance business. He lived in New Liskeard. He died in Ottawa in 1966.
