= Wilf Spooner =

Canadian politician

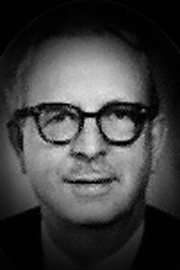

Ontario MPP
- In office 1955–1967
- Preceded by: Bill Grummett
- Succeeded by: Bill Ferrier
- Constituency: Cochrane South

Personal details
- Born: February 8, 1910 Massey, Ontario
- Died: February 14, 2001 (aged 91) North Bay, Ontario
- Party: Progressive Conservative
- Occupation: Accountant

Joseph Wilfred Spooner (February 8, 1910 – February 14, 2001) was a politician in Ontario, Canada. He was a Progressive Conservative member of the Legislative Assembly of Ontario from 1955 to 1967 who represented the northern Ontario riding of Cochrane South. He was a cabinet minister in the governments of Leslie Frost and John Robarts. Prior to his provincial role he served as a municipal councillor for Timmins City Council from 1939 to 1951 and then as mayor of Timmins from 1952 to 1955.

== Background ==
Outside politics Spooner was an accountant and worked for an insurance agency serving clients in northeastern Ontario. Spooner was one of the charter members of the Rotary Club of Timmins.

== Politics ==
He was considered an extremely influential voice for Northern Ontario during his time at Queen's Park. He held three different ministerial positions, including serving as Minister of Lands and Forests, Minister of Mines and Minister of Municipal Affairs. As Minister of Mines, he was credited with implementing important health and safety initiatives in response to the dire working conditions in the gold mines in the Kirkland Lake district. As Minister of Lands and Forests, he expanded the provincial park system. He officially opened Cold Creek Conservation Area in 1962.

=== Cabinet posts ===
Robarts ministry, Province of Ontario (1961–1971)
Cabinet post (1)
| Predecessor | Office | Successor |
|---|---|---|
| Fred Cass | Minister of Municipal Affairs; 1962-1967 | Darcy McKeough |
Frost ministry, Province of Ontario (1949–1961)
Cabinet posts (2)
| Predecessor | Office | Successor |
| Clare Mapledoram | Minister of Lands and Forests; 1958-1962 | Kelso Roberts |
| Philip Kelly | Minister of Mines; 1957-1958 | James Maloney |

== Later life ==
In 1978, Premier Bill Davis appointed Spooner as the chair of the Ontario Northland Transportation Commission. In 1987, he received an honorary doctorate from University of Sudbury.
