= Thunder Bay (provincial electoral district) =

Former electoral district in Ontario, Canada

Ontario electoral district

Defunct provincial electoral district
- Legislature: Legislative Assembly of Ontario
- District created: 1967
- District abolished: 1975
- First contested: 1967
- Last contested: 1971

Thunder Bay was an electoral district in the northwestern part of Ontario, Canada, that was represented in the Legislative Assembly of Ontario from 1967 until 1975.

The district was abolished in 1975 and became Lake Nipigon.

== Election results ==
1971 Ontario general election
| Party | Candidate | Votes | % | ±% |
|---|---|---|---|---|
| New Democratic | Jack Stokes | 6,996 | 55.03 | +17.47 |
| Progressive Conservative | W. Stewart Brydges | 3,114 | 24.50 | –3.24 |
| Liberal | Harry Assad | 2,602 | 20.47 | –14.23 |
| Total valid votes | | 12,712 | 98.90 | |
| Total rejected ballots | | 142 | 1.10 | +0.27 |
| Turnout | | 12,854 | 75.38 | +6.98 |
| Eligible voters | | 17,052 | | |
| New Democratic hold | | Swing | | +10.35 |
Source: Elections Ontario

1967 Ontario general election
| Party | Candidate | Votes | % |
|---|---|---|---|
| New Democratic | Jack Stokes | 4,064 | 37.57 |
| Liberal | Raymond Rudiak | 3,754 | 34.70 |
| Progressive Conservative | Toivo F. Seppala | 3,000 | 27.73 |
| Total valid votes | | 10,818 | 99.17 |
| Total rejected ballots | | 91 | 0.83 |
| Turnout | | 10,909 | 68.40 |
| Eligible voters | | 15,949 | |
| New Democratic pickup new district. | | | |
Source: Elections Ontario

== See also ==
- List of Ontario provincial electoral districts
- Canadian provincial electoral districts
- List of Canadian electoral districts
