= Bill Ferrier =

Canadian politician

Ontario MPP
- In office 1967–1977
- Preceded by: Wilf Spooner
- Succeeded by: Alan Pope
- Constituency: Cochrane South

Personal details
- Born: November 8, 1932 (age 93) Barrie, Ontario, Canada
- Party: New Democrat
- Spouses: Jean Gignac (m. 1961; died 2002); Ruth Margaret Mahady (m. 2005)
- Occupation: Church minister

William Herman Ferrier (born November 8, 1932) was a Canadian politician. He represented the electoral district of Cochrane South in the Legislative Assembly of Ontario from 1967 to 1977 as a member of the Ontario New Democratic Party.

== Background ==
He was born in Barrie in 1932, the son of Herman and Della (Abercrombie) Ferrier. He was educated at North Toronto Collegiate Institute and later at University College and Victoria College at the University of Toronto. He received his B.A. from Victoria in 1956. He was a candidate for the ministry of the United Church of Canada from Metropolitan United Church in Toronto. He attended Emmanuel College and graduated in 1959. He served congregations in Mattawa, ON (1959–63) and Timmins, ON, Mountjoy United Church (1963–1967 and 1982–1998). He married Jean Gignac of Parry Sound in 1961. Following the death of his wife, Jean in 2002, Ferrier was remarried in 2005 to Ruth Margaret Mahady and currently lives in London, Ontario. In 2004 he was ordained a priest in the Anglican Church of Canada.

== Politics ==
He was elected to the Ontario Legislature defeating PC Municipal Affairs Minister Wilf Spooner in October 1967 and again in October 1971. In 1975, he was re-elected with a larger majority. A well-liked and respected member of the Ontario Legislature, Ferrier served on committees that dealt with Election Law and Finance, Agricultural Land Drainage and Automobile Safety. He subsequently ran as a federal New Democratic candidate in Timmins—Chapleau in the 1980 election, but lost to incumbent MP Ray Chénier. Ferrier was a long time trustee on the former Timmins Board of Education serving from 1978 until his retirement from the position in 1995. He served several terms as the Chairman of the School Board.
