= Jack Stokes (politician) =

Canadian politician

Ontario MPP
- In office 1975–1985
- Preceded by: New riding
- Succeeded by: Gilles Pouliot
- Constituency: Lake Nipigon
- In office 1967–1975
- Preceded by: New riding
- Succeeded by: Riding abolished
- Constituency: Thunder Bay

Personal details
- Born: February 17, 1923; Schreiber, Ontario
- Died: January 8, 2000 (aged 76)
- Political party: New Democrat
- Occupation: Railway conductor

John Edward (Jack) Stokes (February 17, 1923 – January 8, 2000) was a Canadian politician. He served in the Legislative Assembly of Ontario from 1967 to 1985, and was Speaker of the legislature from 1977 to 1981. Stokes was a member of the New Democratic Party.

== Background ==
Stokes was born in Schreiber, Ontario and was educated in the area. He worked as a railway conductor for the Canadian Pacific Railway before entering political life, and became familiar with many Northern Ontario communities that he later represented in the legislature. Stokes was a municipal hydro commissioner from 1959 to 1963, a Credit Union director from 1965 to 1968, and chair of the Local Brotherhood Railway Trainmen from 1955 to 1967. He was a Roman Catholic, and a member of the Knights of Columbus.

== Politics ==
He was elected to the Ontario legislature in the 1967 provincial election, defeating Liberal candidate Raymond Rudiak by 310 votes in Thunder Bay. The riding was mostly rural and pre-dated the naming of the city of Thunder Bay. It covered 110,000 square miles (280,000 km^{2}) across much of northwestern Ontario from Lake Superior to Hudson Bay.

Stokes was returned by a much greater majority in the 1971 election. He is one of the first MPPs to regularly raise issues regarding First Nations people, and was also committed to issues of the environment, forestry renewal and northern affairs.

He was re-elected for the redistributed constituency of Lake Nipigon in the 1975 provincial election. Bill Davis's Progressive Conservatives were reduced to a minority government in this election, and Stokes served as Deputy Speaker in the parliament that followed.

Davis's party won a second consecutive minority government in the 1977 election, and the premier appointed Stokes to become Speaker of the Legislature on October 17, 1977. He was the first CCF or NDP member to serve as Speaker, and the first non-government member to hold the position since the United Farmers of Ontario government of the 1920s. Stokes was considered a tough, no-nonsense Speaker who would expel even members of his own party from the house if they were being unruly.

He returned to the NDP caucus following the 1981 Ontario election, in which the Progressive Conservatives were returned with a majority government. He supported Jim Foulds for the party leadership in 1982, and did not seek re-election in 1985. By the time of his retirement, Stokes had turned Lake Nipigon into one of the safest NDP seats in the province.

=== Parliamentary positions ===
Special Parliamentary Responsibilities
Predecessor	Title	Successor
William Hodgson	Deputy Speaker; 1975-1977	Hugh Edighoffer

== Later life ==
After leaving the legislature, Stokes was active with Lakehead University and Confederation College and also worked on forestry issues. Stokes died of lung cancer at the age of 76.
