= Robert Bain (politician) =

Canadian politician

Ontario MPP
- In office 1975–1977
- Preceded by: Ed Havrot
- Succeeded by: Ed Havrot
- Constituency: Timiskaming

Personal details
- Born: March 6, 1946 (age 80) Sudbury, Ontario
- Party: New Democrat
- Occupation: Businessowner

Robert (Bob) Bain (born March 6, 1946) is a former politician in Ontario, Canada. He served as a New Democrat member in the Legislative Assembly of Ontario from 1975 to 1977.

== Background ==
Bain was born in Sudbury.

== Politics ==
Bain won a seat in the 1975 provincial election by defeating incumbent Ed Havrot of the Progressive Conservatives. A minority government led by Tory Premier Bill Davis was returned. When the government was dissolved for early elections two years later in 1977, Bain lost his seat to Havrot in a re-match by 664 votes. He contested the seat again in the 1981 provincial election, and was again defeated by Havrot.

He remained active in the NDP and was president of the Timiksaming NDP riding association in 1989 when party leader Bob Rae was arrested after joining an anti-logging protest in the environmentally sensitive forests of Temagami. Bain criticized Rae's participation in the protest saying, "He should have consulted with the riding association before plunging into the middle of this... His approach is typical to people in Toronto who never get outside the city except on summer vacations."
