= Lake Nipigon (electoral district) =

Former provincial electoral district in Ontario, Canada

Ontario electoral district

Defunct provincial electoral district
- Legislature: Legislative Assembly of Ontario
- District created: 1974
- District abolished: 1996
- First contested: 1975
- Last contested: 1995

Lake Nipigon was a provincial electoral district in Ontario, Canada. It existed from 1975 to 1999, when it was abolished when ridings were redistributed to match their federal counterpart. It consisted of the areas around Lake Nipigon in Northern Ontario.

== Members of Provincial Parliament ==
- Jack Stokes (New Democrat ) (1975–1985)
- Gilles Pouliot (New Democrat) (1985–1999)

Lake Nipigon
| Assembly | Years | Member | Party |
|---|---|---|---|
Riding created out of Thunder Bay
| 30th | 1975–1977 | Jack Stokes | New Democratic |
| 31st | 1977–1981 | Jack Stokes | New Democratic |
| 32nd | 1981–1985 | Jack Stokes | New Democratic |
| 33rd | 1985–1987 | Gilles Pouliot | New Democratic |
| 34th | 1987–1990 | Gilles Pouliot | New Democratic |
| 35th | 1990–1995 | Gilles Pouliot | New Democratic |
| 36th | 1995–1999 | Gilles Pouliot | New Democratic |
Riding dissolved into Kenora—Rainy River, Thunder Bay—Atikokan and Thunder Bay—Superior North

== Election results ==
1995 Ontario general election
| Party | Candidate | Votes | % | ±% |
|---|---|---|---|---|
| New Democratic | Gilles Pouliot | 5,079 | 42.99 | –22.21 |
| Liberal | Ian McQuarrie | 3,463 | 29.31 | +5.20 |
| Progressive Conservative | Vic Fournel | 3,273 | 27.70 | +21.95 |
| Total valid votes | | 11,815 | 98.98 | |
| Total rejected, unmarked and declined ballots | | 122 | 1.02 | +0.30 |
| Turnout | | 11,937 | 54.99 | –5.00 |
| Eligible voters | | 21,708 | | |
| New Democratic hold | | Swing | | –13.70 |
Source: Elections Ontario

1990 Ontario general election
| Party | Candidate | Votes | % | ±% |
|---|---|---|---|---|
| New Democratic | Gilles Pouliot | 8,335 | 65.19 | +1.12 |
| Liberal | Judy Tinnes | 3,083 | 24.11 | –3.24 |
| Progressive Conservative | Jim Vibert | 735 | 5.75 | –2.82 |
| Family Coalition | Bill Thibeault | 632 | 4.94 | – |
| Total valid votes | | 12,785 | 99.28 | |
| Total rejected, unmarked and declined ballots | | 93 | 0.72 | +0.26 |
| Turnout | | 12,878 | 59.98 | –4.50 |
| Eligible voters | | 21,469 | | |
| New Democratic hold | | Swing | | +2.18 |
Source: Elections Ontario

1987 Ontario general election
| Party | Candidate | Votes | % | ±% |
|---|---|---|---|---|
| New Democratic | Gilles Pouliot | 8,446 | 64.08 | +22.38 |
| Liberal | Herman Mannila | 3,606 | 27.36 | +2.17 |
| Progressive Conservative | Vic Fournel | 1,129 | 8.57 | –24.54 |
| Total valid votes | | 13,181 | 99.54 | |
| Total rejected ballots | | 61 | 0.46 | –0.11 |
| Turnout | | 13,242 | 64.48 | +0.07 |
| Eligible voters | | 20,536 | | |
| New Democratic hold | | Swing | | +10.10 |
Source: Elections Ontario

1985 Ontario general election
| Party | Candidate | Votes | % | ±% |
|---|---|---|---|---|
| New Democratic | Gilles Pouliot | 5,708 | 41.70 | –27.20 |
| Progressive Conservative | Jim Files | 4,532 | 33.11 | +17.06 |
| Liberal | Michael Power | 3,448 | 25.19 | +10.14 |
| Total valid votes | | 13,688 | 99.43 | |
| Total rejected ballots | | 79 | 0.57 | +0.15 |
| Turnout | | 13,767 | 64.41 | +8.73 |
| Eligible voters | | 21,375 | | |
| New Democratic hold | | Swing | | –22.13 |
Source: Elections Ontario

1981 Ontario general election
| Party | Candidate | Votes | % | ±% |
|---|---|---|---|---|
| New Democratic | Jack Stokes | 7,846 | 68.90 | +1.89 |
| Progressive Conservative | John Paziuk | 1,828 | 16.05 | –4.85 |
| Liberal | John A. Lentowicz | 1,714 | 15.05 | +2.97 |
| Total valid votes | | 11,388 | 99.58 | |
| Total rejected ballots | | 48 | 0.42 | –0.02 |
| Turnout | | 11,436 | 55.68 | –3.14 |
| Eligible voters | | 20,540 | | |
| New Democratic hold | | Swing | | +3.37 |
Source: Elections Ontario

1977 Ontario general election
| Party | Candidate | Votes | % | ±% |
|---|---|---|---|---|
| New Democratic | Jack Stokes | 7,747 | 67.01 | +7.63 |
| Progressive Conservative | Al Charr | 2,417 | 20.91 | +6.17 |
| Liberal | John A. Lentowicz | 1,397 | 12.08 | –13.79 |
| Total valid votes | | 11,561 | 99.56 | |
| Total rejected ballots | | 51 | 0.44 | –0.05 |
| Turnout | | 11,612 | 58.81 | –7.90 |
| Eligible voters | | 19,744 | | |
| New Democratic hold | | Swing | | +0.73 |
Source: Elections Ontario

1975 Ontario general election
| Party | Candidate | Votes | % |
|---|---|---|---|
| New Democratic | Jack Stokes | 7,114 | 59.38 |
| Liberal | Michael Power | 3,100 | 25.88 |
| Progressive Conservative | Gino Caccamo | 1,766 | 14.74 |
| Total valid votes | | 11,980 | 99.51 |
| Total rejected ballots | | 59 | 0.49 |
| Turnout | | 12,039 | 66.71 |
| Eligible voters | | 18,046 | |
| New Democratic pickup new district. | | | |
Source: Elections Ontario

== See also ==
- List of Ontario provincial electoral districts
- Canadian provincial electoral districts
