= Jan Dukszta =

Canadian politician (1932–2025)

Ontario MPP
- In office 1971–1981
- Preceded by: James Trotter
- Succeeded by: Tony Ruprecht
- Constituency: Parkdale

Personal details
- Born: Janusz Romuald Dukszta; May 27, 1932 Poland
- Died: July 31, 2025 (aged 93)
- Party: NDP
- Spouse: Max
- Occupation: Psychiatrist

Janusz Romuald Dukszta (May 27, 1932 – July 31, 2025) was a Canadian psychiatrist, art patron, and politician in Ontario. He was a New Democratic member of the Legislative Assembly of Ontario from 1971 to 1981 representing the riding of Parkdale in Toronto.

== Background ==
Dukszta was born in Poland in 1932. He and his brother, Andrzej, escaped with their mother from Poland near the end of World War II and settled in London where they were educated at Christ College, Brecon. Their father was responsible for resettling and educating Poles in England. He was trained in medicine in Dublin and then moved to Canada in 1950, serving his psychiatric residency in North Bay, Ontario.

Dukszta died on July 31, 2025, at the age of 93. He was survived by his husband as well as a sister.

== Politics ==
An avowed socialist, Dukszta was elected in the 1971 provincial election in the Toronto riding of Parkdale. He was re-elected in 1975 and by more than 2,400 votes in the 1977 before losing by 900 votes in the 1981 provincial election to Liberal Tony Ruprecht.

Dukszta attributed his defeat, in part, to an anti-gay campaign by a group called "Positive Parents" that targeted NDP candidates in several Toronto ridings because of the party's support for an amendment to the Ontario Human Rights Code to prohibit discrimination in housing and employment on the basis of sexual orientation. The group distributed literature that claimed Dukstza was gay while a second group, Campaign Life, distributed literature denouncing him for supporting maintaining coverage for abortions under Ontario Health Insurance Plan.

At one all-candidates' meeting Dukszta held up a hand-made pink triangle and a yellow star to illustrate the danger he saw in anti-homosexual sentiment being used against New Democrats. "I saw this sort of thing in Poland during the war, when the Germans made homosexuals wear pink triangles and Jews had to wear the star," Dukszta told the Globe and Mail saying of the anti-gay organizations "These groups are dangerous.... It is the start of fascism.... Are we going to go through another McCarthy period when minorities will be attacked allegedly in the name of the moral majority?" Dukszta claimed he was also the target of a smear campaign that falsely accused the psychiatrist of providing abortion services. "Some of their canvassers were saying I was doing abortions in the back room. Our canvassers were hearing it."

Dukszta helped write the NDPs health and education policy. As a member of the NDP caucus he served as critic for housing and, subsequently, for culture and recreation.

Dukszta had also taken time out of his re-election campaign to treat fellow NDP MPP Tony Lupusella who had suffered a nervous breakdown and was unable to campaign but was nevertheless re-elected by 231 votes.

== After politics ==
Dukszta returned to psychiatric practice following his defeat and, by 1986, was head of medical staff at Queen Street Mental Health Centre in Toronto. After retiring from the staff, he continued to see private patients into his 80s.

Dukszta was dedicated to the arts, the visual arts in particular. Over his more than a half-century living in Canada he purchased and commissioned hundreds of works of art, many of which have been donated to museums and galleries. In particular, many of the commissioned works include portraits of himself in a variety of poses. By 2015, he had collected nearly 100 such pieces, about a third of which were displayed in the one-room 800-foot Rosedale apartment he had lived in for more than fifty years. “I have no family, no house, or car — none of the usual accoutrements of a psychiatrist’s life,” he told the Toronto Star in 2015. "All the money is in art.”

In 2010, the University of Toronto Art Centre held an exhibition entitled Portrait of a Patron that showcased artwork that Dukszta had commissioned since 1953. His life and art patronage was the subject of Michael Kainer's 2025 documentary, Patron Saint.

== Works ==
By Aleksandra Ziolkowska-Boehm,

- Ziolkowska-Boehm, Aleksandra (1984). Dreams and Reality: Polish Canadian Identities. Toronto. ISBN 0-9691756-0-4.
- Ziolkowska-Boehm, Aleksandra (1986). Kanada, Kanada /Canada, Canada.../. Warsaw. ISBN 83-7021-006-6.
