= Parkdale (provincial electoral district) =

Former provincial electoral district in Ontario, Canada

Ontario electoral district
- Parkdale, in relation to the other Toronto ridings, after the 1926 redistribution.

Defunct provincial electoral district
- Legislature: Legislative Assembly of Ontario
- District created: 1914
- District abolished: 1999
- First contested: 1914
- Last contested: 1995

Parkdale was a provincial electoral district in Ontario, Canada, that elected Members of Provincial Parliament (MPP) to the Legislative Assembly of Ontario. The riding was created from the western part of Toronto West riding in 1914 and abolished in 1996 and redistributed into the Parkdale—High Park, Davenport and Trinity—Spadina ridings for the 1999 Ontario general election.

== Boundaries ==
=== 1914, 1919, and 1923 ===
The original boundaries for the Parkdale, Ontario provincial electoral district from 1914 to 1926

The Parkdale electoral district's first incarnation was for the 1914 Ontario general election. The following described boundaries were in force for the 1914, 1919 and 1923 Ontario general elections. Its boundaries started north-westerly at the city's northern limits with York Township, starting just south of Lavender Road, through the northern side of Rowntree Avenue, continuing just north of Innes Avenue, to its eastern border through Prospect Cemetery. The boundary then went southwards along Prospect Cemetery's eastern border until it converged with Lansdowne Avenue at St. Clair Avenue West. The eastern boundary followed Lansdowne all the way to Queen Street West, where it went eastward for a block, then went down the western side of Dunn Avenue to Lake Ontario. The western boundary started at the eastern side of Keele Street (since 1921, this part of Keele Street is named Parkside Drive) at Queen Street West (since 1956, this is called The Queensway). From there, the boundary went north to Bloor Street West where it then went eastward to point east of Indian Road (or about half-way between present day Indian Road and Dorval Avenue). It then travelled north along Indian Road to Humberside Avenue. It went east along Humberside until it intersected with the western Grand Trunk Railway — after 1921, the Canadian National Railway (CNR) — tracks. It went north-westerly until it intersected with the east–west Canadian Pacific Railway (CPR) tracks. It went east along the CPR tracks to the north-south Grand Trunk tracks, where the western boundary went north again along the tracks and connected with the northern boundary at the city limits, just south of Lavender Road.

=== 1926, 1929 ===
For the 1926 election, Parkdale's northernmost boundary was the east–west CPR tracks, just north of Dupont Avenue. The northern boundary then went east until the CNR tracks near Lansdowne Avenue. From there, the boundary went south along the CNR tracks to Dundas Street West. From there the eastern boundary went west on Dundas for about a block to the western side of Sorauren Avenue. It then plunged south along Sorauren to Queen Street West, then followed the southern part of Queen, easterly until Dowling Avenue. It then plunged south again to the southern border, Lake Ontario. The western boundary started on land at the western edge of High Park, which was the city limits. The western boundary continued north to Bloor Street West at Clendenan Avenue / Windego Way. It continued eastwards to Indian Road. It then travelled north along Indian Road to Humberside Avenue. From there it went east on Humberside until it intersected the western CNR tracks. The boundary then went north-westerly until it intersected with the northern boundary at the east–west CPR tracks. These boundaries were also in force for the 1929 Ontario general election as well.

=== 1934, 1937, and 1938 ===
Redistribution gave Parkdale some of the area that was previously part of the Brockton electoral district. It also relinquished all the area north of Bloor Street West. The northern border was a straight line from approximately Clendenan Avenue straight to Brock Avenue. The boundary then went south along Brock Avenue to Queen Street West. It went east again, along the south side of Queen until Elm Grove Avenue. It went south along Elm Grove until King Street West. At King Street West, it went west along King's north side until Spencer Avenue. The boundary then moved south along Spencer's western side all the way to the southern boundary, Lake Ontario. The western boundary on land started at the city limits on the west side of High Park. It went straight along the city limits until it again met Bloor Street West at approximately Clendenan Avenue / Wendigo Way.

=== 1943, 1945, and 1948 ===
Parkdale's northernmost boundary was the east-west CPR tracks, just north of Dupont Avenue. The northern boundary then went east until Lansdowne Avenue. It then went south to Wallace Avenue. It then went east along Wallace's south side to Brock Avenue. The boundary then went south along Brock Avenue to Queen Street West. It went east again, along the south side of Queen until Elm Grove. It went south along Elm Grove until King Street West. At King Street West, it went west along King's north side until Spencer Avenue. The boundary then moved south along Spencer's western side all the way to the southern boundary, Lake Ontario. The western boundary started on land at the western edge of High Park, which was the city limits. The western boundary continued north to Bloor Street West at Wendigo Way. It continued eastwards to Indian Road. It then travelled north along Indian Road to Humberside Avenue. From there it travelled along western CNR tracks until it met up with the northern boundary at the east–west CPR tracks.

=== 1951 ===
Parkdale provincial electoral district 1951

Parkdale's northernmost boundary was the east–west CPR tracks, just north of Dupont Avenue. The northern boundary then went east until Lansdowne Avenue. It then went south to Wallace Avenue. It then went east along Wallace's south side to Brock Avenue. The boundary then went south along Brock Avenue to Queen Street West. It went east again, along the south side of Queen until Elm Grove. It went south along Elm Grove until King Street West. At King Street West, it went west along King's north side until Spencer Avenue. The boundary then moved south along Spencer's western side all the way to the southern boundary, Lake Ontario. The western boundary started on the eastern edge of the Humber River, going north to the CNR Lakeshore tracks. It went east along these tracks to the city limits, at the western edge of High Park. The western boundary continued in a straight-line north to Bloor Street West, near Wendigo Way. It continued eastwards to Indian Road. It then travelled north along Indian Road to Humberside Avenue. From there it travelled along western CNR tracks until it met up with the northern boundary at the east–west CPR tracks.

=== 1955, 1959, and 1963 ===
Parkdale's northernmost boundary was the east–west CPR tracks, just north of Dupont Avenue. The northern boundary then went east until Lansdowne Avenue. It then went south to Wallace Avenue. It then went east along Wallace's south side to Brock Avenue. The boundary then went south along Brock Avenue to Queen Street West. It went east again, along the south side of Queen until Elm Grove Avenue. It went south along Elm Grove until King Street West. At King Street West, it went west along King's north side until Spencer Avenue. The boundary then moved south along Spencer's western side all the way to the southern boundary, Lake Ontario. The western boundary started on the eastern edge of the Humber River, going north to the CNR Lakeshore tracks. It went east along these tracks to the city limits, at the western edge of High Park. The western boundary continued in a straight-line north to Bloor Street West, near Wendigo Way. It continued eastwards to the CNR / CPR tracks. From there it travelled north-westerly along CNR tracks until it met up with the northern boundary at the east–west CPR tracks.

=== 1967, 1971 ===
Parkdale provincial electoral district from 1967 to 1975

Prior to the 1967 election, a major redrawing of the boundaries took place in 1966. Parkdale's northernmost boundary was the city limits with The Borough of York, starting south of Lavender Road, through the northern side of Rowntree Avenue, continuing just north of Innes Avenue, to its eastern border through Prospect Cemetery. The boundary then went southwards from a point starting across the street from Morrison Avenue on Harvie Avenue. The eastern border went down Harvie until it turned east at St. Clair Avenue West, going as far as Greenlaw Avenue. It then went south on Greenlaw until Davenport Road. The boundary continued south along Primrose Avenue until the east–west CPR railway tracks. It then continued south along Emerson Avenue until it reached Wallace Avenue. It went east along Wallace until Brock Avenue. It then continued south along Brock Avenue all the way to Queen Street West, where it went eastward for a block, then went down the western side of Elm Grove Avenue to King Street West. The boundary then jogged west along King for about a block to Spencer Avenue. It then went south all the way to Lake Ontario. The western boundary started on the lakefront, at approximately a point 250 metres directly south of Dowling Avenue. It went north along Dowling until King Street West. It jogged slightly west and continued north along Beatty Avenue to Queen Street West. A short jog east along Queen before continuing north along Sorauren Avenue to Dundas Street West. It went east along the southern side of Dundas to the CNR / CPR tracks. The boundary followed the CNR tracks in a north-westerly direction up to the old York-Toronto city limits.

=== 1975, 1977, 1981, and 1985 ===
Parkdale provincial electoral district 1975–1987

The 1975 boundary redistribution gave the Parkdale electoral district some territory from the old High Park district. The boundaries were in effect for the 1975 Ontario general election to the 1985 Ontario general election. Parkdale's northernmost boundary was the city's northern boundary with The Borough of York, starting south of Lavender Road', through the northern side of Rowntree Avenue, continuing just north of Innes Avenue, to its eastern border through Prospect Cemetery. The boundary then went southwards from a point starting across the street from Morrison Avenue on Harvie Avenue. The eastern border went down Harvie until it turned east at St. Clair Avenue West, going as far as Greenlaw Ave. It then went south on Greenlaw until Davenport Road. The boundary continued south along Primrose Avenue until the east–west CPR tracks. It then continued south along Emerson Avenue until it reached Wallace Avenue. It went east along Wallace until Brock Avenue. It then continued south along Brock Avenue all the way to Queen Street West, where it went eastward for a block, then went down the western side of Elm Grove Avenue to King Street West. The boundary then jogged west along King for about a block to Spencer Avenue. It then went south all the way to Lake Ontario. The western boundary started on the lakefront, at approximately a point 250 metres south of Dowling Avenue. It went north to Dowling Avenue and the Gardiner Expressway. It kept going west along the westbound lanes on the Gardiner to a point south of Sunnyside Avenue. It then proceeded to go east along the south side of The Queensway until it reached Roncesvalles Avenue. From there, the boundary went north to Bloor Street West where it then went eastward to the north-south CPR tracks. It then travelled north-west along CPR tracks and connected with the northern boundary at the city limits, just south of Lavender Road.

=== 1987, 1990, and 1995 ===
The final configuration of the Parkdale electoral district 1987–1999

The final electoral district redistribution was in place for the 1987 Ontario general election, and pushed Parkdale's boundaries a bit further east. The northern border was a straight line from the intersection of Bloor Street West and Dundas Street West, straight across Bloor to Ossington Avenue. The boundary then went south along Ossington Avenue to College Street. It went west along College until it reached Dovercourt Road. The boundary continued south along Dovercourt, crossing King Street West to Atlantic Avenue where it continued south until the Gardiner Expressway west-bound lanes. The boundary then jogged east along the Gardiner to Strachan Avenue. It then went south on Strachan to Lake Ontario. The western boundary on land started at the waterfront immediately south of Roncesvalles Avenue. The boundary then went north along Roncesvalles to Dundas Street West, and continued on Dundas until it met up with Bloor Street West. The district was abolished in 1996, when provincial legislation redistributed all provincial districts to follow the same boundaries as Ontario's federal electoral districts.

== Members of Provincial Parliament ==
Parkdale
Assembly	Years	Member	Party
Created in 1914 from part of Toronto West riding
14th	1914–1919	William Price (Note: In 1938, the title of Member of the Legislative Assembly was officially changed to Member of Provincial Parliament. Previously, it was unofficially used in the media and in the Legislature.)	Conservative
15th	1919–1923	William Price	Conservative
16th	1923–1926	William Price	Conservative
17th	1926–1929	William Price	Conservative
18th	1929–1934	William Price	Conservative
19th	1934–1937	William Price	Conservative
20th	1937–1938	Fred McBrien (Note: McBrien died in office on 2 July 1938, forcing a by-election on 5 October 1938)	Conservative
20th	1938–1943	William James Stewart	Progressive Conservative
21st	1943–1945	William James Stewart	Progressive Conservative
22nd	1945–1948	William James Stewart	Progressive Conservative
23rd	1948–1951	Lloyd Fell	Co-operative Commonwealth
24th	1951–1955	William James Stewart	Progressive Conservative
25th	1955–1959	William James Stewart	Progressive Conservative
26th	1959–1963	James Trotter	Liberal
27th	1963–1967	James Trotter	Liberal
28th	1967–1971	James Trotter	Liberal
29th	1971–1975	Jan Dukszta	New Democratic
30th	1975–1977	Jan Dukszta	New Democratic
31st	1977–1981	Jan Dukszta	New Democratic
32nd	1981–1985	Tony Ruprecht	Liberal
33rd	1985–1987	Tony Ruprecht	Liberal
34th	1987–1990	Tony Ruprecht	Liberal
35th	1990–1995	Tony Ruprecht	Liberal
36th	1995–1999	Tony Ruprecht	Liberal
Sourced from the Ontario Legislative Assembly
Merged into Parkdale—High Park, Davenport and Trinity—Spadina ridings after 1996

== Election results ==
1995 Ontario general election
Party	Candidate	Votes	%	±%
Liberal	Tony Ruprecht	8,435	47.87	+1.47
New Democratic	Martin Silva	5,795	32.89	–10.50
Progressive Conservative	Fred Blucher	2,887	16.38	+10.98
Green	Miriam Hawkins	363	2.06	+0.19
Communist	Wilfred Szczesny	142	0.81	–
Total valid votes		17,622	98.29	
Total rejected, unmarked and declined ballots		306	1.71	+0.07
Turnout		17,928	64.03	+2.81
Eligible voters		27,999		
Liberal hold		Swing		+5.99
Source: Elections Ontario

1990 Ontario general election
Party	Candidate	Votes	%	±%
Liberal	Tony Ruprecht	8,080	46.39	–23.07
New Democratic	Sheena Weir	7,557	43.39	+22.90
Progressive Conservative	John Swettenham	941	5.40	+1.28
Green	Robert Hunter	325	1.87	–
Libertarian	James R. McCulloch	241	1.38	–0.08
Independent	Debra Stone	167	0.96	–
Independent	Joe Young	106	0.61	–
Total valid votes		17,417	98.37	
Total rejected, unmarked and declined ballots		289	1.63	+0.58
Turnout		17,706	61.22	–1.13
Eligible voters		28,921		
Liberal hold		Swing		–22.99
Source: Elections Ontario

1987 Ontario general election
Party	Candidate	Votes	%	±%
Liberal	Tony Ruprecht	13,430	69.46	+6.80
New Democratic	Vasco Dos Santos	3,961	20.49	–6.19
Progressive Conservative	Charles Olito	798	4.13	–6.53
Family Coalition	Clara Marmelo	389	2.01	–
Libertarian	Danny Hunt	283	1.46	–
Communist	Gordon Massie	184	0.95	–
Independent	Camilo Tiqui	176	0.91	–
Independent	Nancy van Schouwen	113	0.58	–
Total valid votes		19,334	98.95	
Total rejected ballots		205	1.05	+0.43
Turnout		19,539	62.35	–4.15
Eligible voters		31,336		
Liberal hold		Swing		+6.49
Source: Elections Ontario

1985 Ontario general election
Party	Candidate	Votes	%	±%
Liberal	Tony Ruprecht	12,065	62.67	+20.40
New Democratic	Richard Gilbert	5,136	26.68	–9.98
Progressive Conservative	Tessie Jew	2,052	10.66	–7.09
Total valid votes		19,253	99.39	
Total rejected ballots		119	0.61	–0.99
Turnout		19,372	66.51	+8.06
Eligible voters		29,128		
Liberal hold		Swing		+15.19
Source: Elections Ontario

1981 Ontario general election
Party	Candidate	Votes	%	±%
Liberal	Tony Ruprecht	6,941	42.26	+12.36
New Democratic	Jan Dukszta	6,020	36.66	–7.46
Progressive Conservative	Verrol Whitmore	2,914	17.74	–6.23
Independent	Bill McGinnis	289	1.76	–
Communist	Anna Larsen	259	1.58	–0.42
Total valid votes		16,423	98.40	
Total rejected ballots		267	1.60	+0.48
Turnout		16,690	58.44	–3.17
Eligible voters		28,558		
Liberal gain from New Democratic		Swing		+9.91
Source: Elections Ontario

1977 Ontario general election
Party	Candidate	Votes	%	±%
New Democratic	Jan Dukszta	7,574	44.12	+2.41
Liberal	Stan Mamak	5,134	29.91	–2.72
Progressive Conservative	Lee Monaco	4,116	23.98	+1.74
Communist	Gareth Blythe	343	2.00	+0.26
Total valid votes		17,167	98.88	
Total rejected ballots		195	1.12	+0.07
Turnout		17,362	61.62	–1.47
Eligible voters		28,178		
New Democratic hold		Swing		+2.56
Source: Elections Ontario

1975 Ontario general election
Party	Candidate	Votes	%	±%
New Democratic	Jan Dukszta	7,158	41.71	+5.34
Liberal	Stan Mamak	5,599	32.62	–1.10
Progressive Conservative	Bob Orr	3,816	22.23	–7.68
Communist	Kerry McCuaig	298	1.74	–
Independent	Robert McKay	203	1.18	–
Independent	Konrad Otta	89	0.52	–
Total valid votes		17,163	98.95	
Total rejected ballots		183	1.06	+0.15
Turnout		17,346	63.09	–3.51
Eligible voters		27,496		
New Democratic hold		Swing		+3.22
Source: Elections Ontario

1971 Ontario general election
Party	Candidate	Votes	%	±%
New Democratic	Jan Dukszta	5,994	36.37	+3.34
Liberal	James Trotter	5,558	33.72	–4.91
Progressive Conservative	Cas Bielski	4,930	29.91	+1.57
Total valid votes		16,482	99.09	
Total rejected ballots		151	0.91	–0.54
Turnout		16,633	66.60	+5.19
Eligible voters		24,976		
New Democratic gain from Liberal		Swing		+4.12
Source: Elections Ontario

1967 Ontario general election
Party	Candidate	Votes	%	±%
Liberal	James Trotter	5,588	38.63	–6.32
New Democratic	Jan Dukszta	4,778	33.03	+11.77
Progressive Conservative	Robert Maksymec	4,099	28.34	–5.45
Total valid votes		14,465	98.55	
Total rejected ballots		213	1.45	+0.13
Turnout		14,678	61.40	+2.90
Eligible voters		23,904		
Liberal hold		Swing		–9.05
Source: Elections Ontario

=== 1955–1967 electoral boundaries ===
Parkdale provincial electoral district 1955–1967

1963 Ontario general election
Party	Candidate	Votes	%	±%
Liberal	James Trotter	9,100	44.95	–2.10
Progressive Conservative	Cas Bielski	6,841	33.79	+0.52
New Democratic	Archie A. Chisholm	4,304	21.26	+1.58
Total valid votes		20,245	98.67	
Total rejected ballots		272	1.33	–0.30
Turnout		20,517	58.51	+1.74
Eligible voters		35,068		
Liberal hold		Swing		–1.31
Source: Elections Ontario

1959 Ontario general election
Party	Candidate	Votes	%	±%
Liberal	James Trotter	9,233	47.05	+13.72
Progressive Conservative	William James Stewart	6,530	33.27	–3.65
Co-operative Commonwealth	Charles Daley	3,862	19.68	–7.40
Total valid votes		19,625	98.37	
Total rejected ballots		325	1.63	+0.53
Turnout		19,950	56.77	+1.73
Eligible voters		35,144		
Liberal gain from Progressive Conservative		Swing		+8.68
Source: Elections Ontario

1955 Ontario general election
Party	Candidate	Votes	%	±%
Progressive Conservative	William James Stewart	7,503	36.92	–5.66
Liberal	James Trotter	6,773	33.33	+8.73
Co-operative Commonwealth	Lloyd Fell	5,503	27.08	–5.74
Labor–Progressive	Harold J. Kinsley	542	2.67	–
Total valid votes		20,321	98.90	
Total rejected ballots		225	1.10	–0.10
Turnout		20,546	55.04	–6.88
Eligible voters		37,329		
Progressive Conservative hold		Swing		–7.20
Source: Elections Ontario

1951 Ontario general election
Party	Candidate	Votes	%	±%
Progressive Conservative	William James Stewart	10,914	42.58	+5.25
Co-operative Commonwealth	Lloyd Fell	8,413	32.82	–6.69
Liberal	James (Jim) E. Colby	6,304	24.60	+1.45
Total valid votes		25,631	98.80	
Total rejected ballots		311	1.20	+0.21
Turnout		25,942	61.92	–6.43
Eligible voters		41,899		
Progressive Conservative gain from Co-operative Commonwealth		Swing		+5.97
Source: Elections Ontario

=== 1943–1951 electoral boundaries ===
Parkdale provincial electoral district as it existed from 1943 to 1951.

1948 Ontario general election
Party	Candidate	Votes	%	±%
Co-operative Commonwealth	Lloyd Fell	11,778	39.52	+16.58
Progressive Conservative	William James Stewart	11,128	37.33	–9.37
Liberal	Jack Bennett	6,900	23.15	–2.82
Total valid votes		29,806	99.01	
Total rejected ballots		297	0.99	–0.26
Turnout		30,103	68.34	–2.72
Eligible voters		44,046		
Co-operative Commonwealth gain from Progressive Conservative		Swing		+9.70
Source: Elections Ontario

1945 Ontario general election
Party	Candidate	Votes	%	±%
Progressive Conservative	William James Stewart	13,875	46.71	+2.13
Liberal	Jack Bennett	7,716	25.97	+5.08
Co-operative Commonwealth	Albert E. Watters	6,812	22.93	–11.60
Labor–Progressive	Albert E. Sculthorp	1,304	4.39	–
Total valid votes		29,707	98.75	
Total rejected ballots		375	1.25	+0.68
Turnout		30,082	71.07	+16.09
Eligible voters		42,328		
Progressive Conservative hold		Swing		–1.47
Source: Elections Ontario

1943 Ontario general election
Party	Candidate	Votes	%	±%
Progressive Conservative	William James Stewart	9,256	44.58	–25.14
Co-operative Commonwealth	Ford Brand	7,170	34.53	+7.06
Liberal	Jack Bennett	4,339	20.90	–
Total valid votes		20,765	99.43	
Total rejected ballots		118	0.57	+0.57
Turnout		20,883	54.98	–
Eligible voters		37,983		
Progressive Conservative gain from Conservative		Swing		–16.10
Source: Elections Ontario

=== 1934–1943 electoral boundaries ===
Parkdale provincial electoral district from 1934 to 1943.

Ontario provincial by-election, October 5, 1938 Death of Fred McBrien
Party	Candidate	Votes	%	±%
Conservative	William James Stewart	9,058	69.72	+25.33
Co-operative Commonwealth	George Isaac Harvey	3,569	27.47	+15.72
Liberal–Progressive	Robert Harding	272	2.09	–
Socialist Labor	George Thomson	93	0.72	–
Total valid votes		12,992	100.00	
Total rejected ballots		–		
Turnout		12,992	–	–
Eligible voters				
Conservative hold		Swing		+4.81
Source: Elections Ontario (Note: Liberal Premier Mitchell Hepburn respected recently deceased Parkdale MPP Fred McBrien, a Conservative, and requested that the Liberal Party not run a candidate in the by-election to replace him. The party agreed, and Robert Harding did not have Liberal Party backing and had to run as an "Independent Liberal".)

1937 Ontario general election
Party	Candidate	Votes	%	±%
Conservative	Fred McBrien	10,583	44.39	+2.13
Liberal	Aubrey Albert Bond	10,456	43.86	+2.48
Co-operative Commonwealth	George Isaac Harvey	2,802	11.75	–4.61
Total valid votes		23,841	99.02	
Total rejected ballots		237	0.98	–1.66
Turnout		24,078	64.01	–2.99
Eligible voters		37,615		
Conservative hold		Swing		–0.18
Source: Elections Ontario

1934 Ontario general election
Party	Candidate	Votes	%	±%
Conservative	William Herbert Price	10,087	42.26	–28.22
Liberal	John Leslie Prentice	9,875	41.37	+16.19
Co-operative Commonwealth	William Bruce Robinson	3,906	16.37	–
Total valid votes		23,868	97.36	
Total rejected ballots		648	2.64	+2.02
Turnout		24,516	67.01	+21.49
Eligible voters		36,588		
Conservative hold		Swing		–22.21
Source: Elections Ontario

=== 1926–1934 electoral boundaries ===
Parkdale provincial electoral district from 1926 to 1934.

1929 Ontario general election
Party	Candidate	Votes	%	±%
Conservative	William Herbert Price	6,203	70.48	+5.04
Liberal	James F. Coughlin	2,216	25.18	–
Independent	Duncan McIntosh	382	4.34	–
Total valid votes		8,801	99.38	
Total rejected ballots		55	0.62	+0.22
Turnout		8,856	45.52	–20.72
Eligible voters		19,457		
Conservative hold		Swing		+2.52
Source: Elections Ontario

1926 Ontario general election
Party	Candidate	Votes	%	±%
Conservative	William Herbert Price	8,915	65.44	–
Prohibitionist	Oscar P. MacLean	4,708	34.56	–
Total valid votes		13,623	99.60	
Total rejected ballots		55	0.40	–
Turnout		13,678	66.23	–
Eligible voters		20,652		
Conservative hold		Swing		–
Source: Elections Ontario

Ontario provincial by-election, August 16, 1923 Ministerial by-election, William Herbert Price appointed Provincial Treasurer
Party	Candidate	Votes
Conservative	William Herbert Price	acclaimed
Source: Elections Ontario

1923 Ontario general election
Party	Candidate	Votes	%	±%
Conservative	William Herbert Price	6,050	79.76	+10.81
Liberal	Dr. John Hunter	1,535	20.24	–10.81
Total valid votes		7,585	99.22	
Total rejected ballots		60	0.78	–8.91
Turnout		7,645	30.68	–35.99
Eligible voters		24,917		
Conservative hold		Swing		+10.81
Source: Elections Ontario

=== 1910s ===
1919 Ontario general election
Party	Candidate	Votes	%	±%
Conservative	William Herbert Price	11,091	68.95	+12.97
Independent	Dr. John Hunter	4,995	31.05	–
Total valid votes		16,086	90.31	
Total rejected ballots		1,726	9.69	+9.02
Turnout		17,812	66.67	+3.75
Eligible voters		26,717		
Conservative hold		Swing		+6.48
Source: Elections Ontario

1914 Ontario general election
Party	Candidate	Votes	%
Conservative	William Herbert Price	2,981	55.98
Temperance	William M. McTavish	2,344	44.02
Total valid votes		5,325	99.33
Total rejected ballots		36	0.67
Turnout		5,361	62.92
Eligible voters		8,520	
Conservative pickup new district.			
Source: Elections Ontario

== See also ==
- List of Ontario provincial electoral districts
- Canadian provincial electoral districts
