= Cochrane South =

Former provincial electoral district in Ontario, Canada

Ontario electoral district

Defunct provincial electoral district
- Legislature: Legislative Assembly of Ontario
- District created: 1926
- District abolished: 1999
- First contested: 1926
- Last contested: 1995

Demographics
- Census division: Cochrane District
- Census subdivision(s): Black River-Matheson, Iroquois Falls, Timmins

Cochrane South was a provincial electoral district in Ontario, Canada. It represented in the Legislative Assembly of Ontario from 1926 to 1999. It encompassed the southern part of the Cochrane District, including the city of Timmins.

For the 1999 election, in which all electoral districts in the province were realigned to match their federal counterparts, Cochrane South was divided between the new districts of Timmins—James Bay and Timiskaming—Cochrane.

== Members of Provincial Parliament ==
Cochrane South
| Assembly | Years | Member | Party |
|---|---|---|---|
| 17th | 1926–1929 | Alfred Franklin Kenning | Conservative |
| 18th | 1929–1934 | Alfred Franklin Kenning | Conservative |
| 19th | 1934–1937 | John Rowlandson | Liberal |
| 20th | 1937–1943 | Charles Vincent Gallagher | Liberal |
| 21st | 1943–1945 | Bill Grummett | Co-operative Commonwealth |
| 22nd | 1945–1948 | Bill Grummett | Co-operative Commonwealth |
| 23rd | 1948–1951 | Bill Grummett | Co-operative Commonwealth |
| 24th | 1951–1955 | Bill Grummett | Co-operative Commonwealth |
| 25th | 1955–1959 | Wilf Spooner | Progressive Conservative |
| 26th | 1959–1963 | Wilf Spooner | Progressive Conservative |
| 27th | 1963–1967 | Wilf Spooner | Progressive Conservative |
| 28th | 1967–1971 | Bill Ferrier | New Democratic |
| 29th | 1971–1975 | Bill Ferrier | New Democratic |
| 30th | 1975–1977 | Bill Ferrier | New Democratic |
| 31st | 1977–1981 | Alan Pope | Progressive Conservative |
| 32nd | 1981–1985 | Alan Pope | Progressive Conservative |
| 33rd | 1985–1987 | Alan Pope | Progressive Conservative |
| 34th | 1987–1990 | Alan Pope | Progressive Conservative |
| 35th | 1990–1995 | Gilles Bisson | New Democratic |
| 36th | 1995–1999 | Gilles Bisson | New Democratic |
Sourced from the Ontario Legislative Assembly
Merged into Timmins—James Bay before the 1999 election

== Election results ==
1995 Ontario general election
| Party | Candidate | Votes | % | ±% |
|---|---|---|---|---|
| New Democratic | Gilles Bisson | 12,114 | 52.45 | +4.83 |
| Progressive Conservative | Gord Miller | 6,587 | 28.52 | +24.28 |
| Liberal | Jim Brown | 4,058 | 17.57 | –21.32 |
| Independent | Joel Vien | 339 | 1.47 | – |
| Total valid votes | | 23,098 | 99.18 | |
| Total rejected, unmarked and declined ballots | | 192 | 0.82 | +0.19 |
| Turnout | | 23,290 | 60.36 | –2.59 |
| Eligible voters | | 38,584 | | |
| New Democratic hold | | Swing | | –9.73 |
Source: Elections Ontario

1990 Ontario general election
| Party | Candidate | Votes | % | ±% |
|---|---|---|---|---|
| New Democratic | Gilles Bisson | 11,460 | 47.61 | +21.73 |
| Liberal | Frank Krznaric | 9,361 | 38.89 | +6.69 |
| Confederation of Regions | Kenneth Metsala | 2,229 | 9.26 | – |
| Progressive Conservative | Tina M. Positano | 1,019 | 4.23 | –37.68 |
| Total valid votes | | 24,069 | 99.37 | |
| Total rejected, unmarked and declined ballots | | 153 | 0.63 | +0.30 |
| Turnout | | 24,222 | 62.95 | +0.65 |
| Eligible voters | | 38,479 | | |
| New Democratic gain from Progressive Conservative | | Swing | | +29.71 |
Source: Elections Ontario

1987 Ontario general election
| Party | Candidate | Votes | % | ±% |
|---|---|---|---|---|
| Progressive Conservative | Alan Pope | 9,735 | 41.92 | –17.13 |
| Liberal | Conrad Carrière | 7,479 | 32.20 | +15.25 |
| New Democratic | Gilles Renaud | 6,010 | 25.88 | +1.89 |
| Total valid votes | | 23,224 | 99.67 | |
| Total rejected ballots | | 78 | 0.33 | –0.64 |
| Turnout | | 23,302 | 62.30 | –0.26 |
| Eligible voters | | 37,404 | | |
| Progressive Conservative hold | | Swing | | –16.19 |
Source: Elections Ontario

1985 Ontario general election
| Party | Candidate | Votes | % | ±% |
|---|---|---|---|---|
| Progressive Conservative | Alan Pope | 13,935 | 59.05 | +2.80 |
| New Democratic | Roger Loiselle | 5,662 | 23.99 | +11.54 |
| Liberal | Jim Martin | 4,002 | 16.96 | –14.33 |
| Total valid votes | | 23,599 | 99.03 | |
| Total rejected ballots | | 232 | 0.97 | +0.67 |
| Turnout | | 23,831 | 62.56 | +0.94 |
| Eligible voters | | 38,094 | | |
| Progressive Conservative hold | | Swing | | –4.37 |
Source: Elections Ontario

1981 Ontario general election
| Party | Candidate | Votes | % | ±% |
|---|---|---|---|---|
| Progressive Conservative | Alan Pope | 12,540 | 56.25 | +4.99 |
| Liberal | John Sullivan | 6,975 | 31.29 | +25.39 |
| New Democratic | Cliff Simpson | 2,777 | 12.46 | –29.49 |
| Total valid votes | | 22,292 | 99.70 | |
| Total rejected ballots | | 68 | 0.30 | +0.01 |
| Turnout | | 22,360 | 61.62 | –8.18 |
| Eligible voters | | 36,288 | | |
| Progressive Conservative hold | | Swing | | –10.20 |
Source: Elections Ontario

1977 Ontario general election
| Party | Candidate | Votes | % | ±% |
|---|---|---|---|---|
| Progressive Conservative | Alan Pope | 12,533 | 51.26 | +8.97 |
| New Democratic | Bill Ferrier | 10,256 | 41.95 | –5.92 |
| Liberal | Kenneth C. Matthews | 1,442 | 5.90 | –2.57 |
| Independent | Clément-G. Larochelle | 219 | 0.90 | – |
| Total valid votes | | 24,450 | 99.71 | |
| Total rejected ballots | | 72 | 0.29 | –0.08 |
| Turnout | | 24,522 | 69.80 | +1.44 |
| Eligible voters | | 35,133 | | |
| Progressive Conservative gain from New Democratic | | Swing | | +7.45 |
Source: Elections Ontario

1975 Ontario general election
| Party | Candidate | Votes | % | ±% |
|---|---|---|---|---|
| New Democratic | Bill Ferrier | 11,073 | 47.87 | –0.56 |
| Progressive Conservative | Alan Pope | 9,781 | 42.29 | –3.36 |
| Liberal | Wayne Keon | 1,958 | 8.46 | +3.06 |
| Social Credit | Robert Keith Cochrane | 205 | 0.89 | – |
| Independent | Peter Bruce | 114 | 0.49 | –0.03 |
| Total valid votes | | 23,131 | 99.63 | |
| Total rejected ballots | | 87 | 0.37 | –0.34 |
| Turnout | | 23,218 | 68.36 | –6.33 |
| Eligible voters | | 33,966 | | |
| New Democratic hold | | Swing | | +1.40 |
Source: Elections Ontario

1971 Ontario general election
| Party | Candidate | Votes | % | ±% |
|---|---|---|---|---|
| New Democratic | Bill Ferrier | 11,383 | 48.43 | +4.93 |
| Progressive Conservative | Wilf Spooner | 10,728 | 45.65 | +6.30 |
| Liberal | Jean Louis La Pierre | 1,270 | 5.40 | –11.75 |
| Independent | Peter Bruce | 122 | 0.52 | – |
| Total valid votes | | 23,503 | 99.29 | |
| Total rejected ballots | | 169 | 0.71 | –0.24 |
| Turnout | | 23,672 | 74.68 | +3.17 |
| Eligible voters | | 31,697 | | |
| New Democratic hold | | Swing | | –0.69 |
Source: Elections Ontario

1967 Ontario general election
| Party | Candidate | Votes | % | ±% |
|---|---|---|---|---|
| New Democratic | Bill Ferrier | 8,377 | 43.51 | +11.40 |
| Progressive Conservative | Wilf Spooner | 7,576 | 39.35 | –12.05 |
| Liberal | Donald MacKinnon | 3,302 | 17.15 | +0.65 |
| Total valid votes | | 19,255 | 99.05 | |
| Total rejected ballots | | 185 | 0.95 | +0.31 |
| Turnout | | 19,440 | 71.51 | +8.58 |
| Eligible voters | | 27,185 | | |
| New Democratic gain from Progressive Conservative | | Swing | | +11.73 |
Source: Elections Ontario

1963 Ontario general election
| Party | Candidate | Votes | % | ±% |
|---|---|---|---|---|
| Progressive Conservative | Wilf Spooner | 12,983 | 51.40 | +2.74 |
| New Democratic | Joe Zbitnew | 8,109 | 32.10 | +1.95 |
| Liberal | Adelard G. (Ed) Couture | 4,169 | 16.50 | –2.37 |
| Total valid votes | | 25,261 | 99.36 | |
| Total rejected ballots | | 163 | 0.64 | –0.60 |
| Turnout | | 25,424 | 62.93 | –3.73 |
| Eligible voters | | 40,400 | | |
| Progressive Conservative hold | | Swing | | +0.39 |
Source: Elections Ontario

1959 Ontario general election
| Party | Candidate | Votes | % | ±% |
|---|---|---|---|---|
| Progressive Conservative | Wilf Spooner | 12,247 | 48.66 | –0.77 |
| Co-operative Commonwealth | Leo Gagnon | 7,588 | 30.15 | –16.74 |
| Liberal | Adelard G. (Ed) Couture | 4,750 | 18.87 | – |
| Labor–Progressive | Len Michaud | 585 | 2.32 | –1.36 |
| Total valid votes | | 25,170 | 98.76 | |
| Total rejected ballots | | 316 | 1.24 | +0.15 |
| Turnout | | 25,486 | 66.66 | +1.43 |
| Eligible voters | | 38,233 | | |
| Progressive Conservative hold | | Swing | | +7.98 |
Source: Elections Ontario

1955 Ontario general election
| Party | Candidate | Votes | % | ±% |
|---|---|---|---|---|
| Progressive Conservative | Wilf Spooner | 11,904 | 49.43 | +15.02 |
| Co-operative Commonwealth | Bill Grummett | 11,292 | 46.89 | +6.07 |
| Labor–Progressive | Oscar Roy | 887 | 3.68 | +0.41 |
| Total valid votes | | 24,083 | 98.91 | |
| Total rejected ballots | | 266 | 1.09 | +0.09 |
| Turnout | | 24,349 | 65.23 | –4.19 |
| Eligible voters | | 37,330 | | |
| Progressive Conservative gain from Co-operative Commonwealth | | Swing | | +4.47 |
Source: Elections Ontario

1951 Ontario general election
| Party | Candidate | Votes | % | ±% |
|---|---|---|---|---|
| Co-operative Commonwealth | Bill Grummett | 10,233 | 40.82 | –10.09 |
| Progressive Conservative | Percy A. Boyce | 8,627 | 34.41 | +5.02 |
| Liberal | Philip Fay | 5,391 | 21.50 | +6.05 |
| Labor–Progressive | Joseph Billings | 820 | 3.27 | – |
| Total valid votes | | 25,071 | 98.99 | |
| Total rejected ballots | | 255 | 1.01 | –0.36 |
| Turnout | | 25,326 | 69.41 | –3.13 |
| Eligible voters | | 36,486 | | |
| Co-operative Commonwealth hold | | Swing | | –7.56 |
Source: Elections Ontario

1948 Ontario general election
| Party | Candidate | Votes | % | ±% |
|---|---|---|---|---|
| Co-operative Commonwealth | Bill Grummett | 14,190 | 50.91 | +10.61 |
| Progressive Conservative | Percy A. Boyce | 8,191 | 29.39 | +5.92 |
| Liberal | Paul Douglas Scanlon | 4,307 | 15.45 | –14.04 |
| Union of Electors | Henri Pelletier | 1,186 | 4.25 | – |
| Total valid votes | | 27,874 | 98.63 | |
| Total rejected ballots | | 387 | 1.37 | +0.02 |
| Turnout | | 28,261 | 72.55 | –6.42 |
| Eligible voters | | 38,956 | | |
| Co-operative Commonwealth hold | | Swing | | +2.34 |
Source: Elections Ontario

1945 Ontario general election
| Party | Candidate | Votes | % | ±% |
|---|---|---|---|---|
| Co-operative Commonwealth | Bill Grummett | 10,521 | 40.29 | –16.71 |
| Liberal | Joseph Emile Brunette | 7,699 | 29.49 | +4.94 |
| Progressive Conservative | L. E. Hornick | 6,126 | 23.46 | +5.02 |
| Labour | M. Karol | 1,764 | 6.76 | – |
| Total valid votes | | 26,110 | 98.65 | |
| Total rejected ballots | | 358 | 1.35 | +0.21 |
| Turnout | | 26,468 | 78.96 | +11.91 |
| Eligible voters | | 33,520 | | |
| Co-operative Commonwealth hold | | Swing | | –10.83 |
Source: Elections Ontario

1943 Ontario general election
| Party | Candidate | Votes | % | ±% |
|---|---|---|---|---|
| Co-operative Commonwealth | Bill Grummett | 12,995 | 57.01 | – |
| Liberal | Joseph Emile Brunette | 5,595 | 24.54 | –24.00 |
| Progressive Conservative | Ralph J. Neelands | 4,205 | 18.45 | –8.40 |
| Total valid votes | | 22,795 | 98.86 | |
| Total rejected ballots | | 264 | 1.14 | –0.11 |
| Turnout | | 23,059 | 67.05 | –6.24 |
| Eligible voters | | 34,390 | | |
| Co-operative Commonwealth gain from Liberal | | Swing | | – |
Source: Elections Ontario

1937 Ontario general election
| Party | Candidate | Votes | % | ±% |
|---|---|---|---|---|
| Liberal | Charles Gallagher | 12,773 | 48.55 | +1.53 |
| Conservative | James P. Bartleman | 7,064 | 26.85 | –2.58 |
| Farm-Labour | Thomas Church | 6,473 | 24.60 | – |
| Total valid votes | | 26,310 | 98.74 | |
| Total rejected ballots | | 335 | 1.26 | –0.63 |
| Turnout | | 26,645 | 73.29 | +1.73 |
| Eligible voters | | 36,357 | | |
| Liberal hold | | Swing | | +2.06 |
Source: Elections Ontario

1934 Ontario general election
| Party | Candidate | Votes | % | ±% |
|---|---|---|---|---|
| Liberal | John Rowlandson | 8,183 | 47.02 | –0.23 |
| Conservative | Alfred Franklin Kenning | 5,122 | 29.43 | –23.33 |
| Co-operative Commonwealth | A. M. Stuart | 2,975 | 17.09 | – |
| Communist | William Lehtinen | 759 | 4.36 | – |
| Independent | A. A. Paquette | 210 | 1.21 | – |
| Independent Conservative | H. A. Ogilvie | 156 | 0.90 | – |
| Total valid votes | | 17,405 | 98.12 | |
| Total rejected ballots | | 334 | 1.88 | +0.39 |
| Turnout | | 17,739 | 71.56 | +14.54 |
| Eligible voters | | 24,789 | | |
| Liberal gain from Conservative | | Swing | | +11.78 |
Source: Elections Ontario

1929 Ontario general election
| Party | Candidate | Votes | % | ±% |
|---|---|---|---|---|
| Conservative | Alfred Franklin Kenning | 5,686 | 52.76 | –15.42 |
| Liberal | John A. McInnes | 5,092 | 47.24 | +15.42 |
| Total valid votes | | 10,778 | 98.51 | |
| Total rejected ballots | | 163 | 1.49 | +0.37 |
| Turnout | | 10,941 | 57.02 | +18.54 |
| Eligible voters | | 19,187 | | |
| Conservative hold | | Swing | | –15.42 |
Source: Elections Ontario

1926 Ontario general election
| Party | Candidate | Votes | % | ±% |
|---|---|---|---|---|
| Conservative | Alfred Franklin Kenning | 5,124 | 68.17 | – |
| Liberal–Labour | James Patrick McGuire | 2,392 | 31.83 | – |
| Total valid votes | | 7,516 | 98.88 | |
| Total rejected ballots | | 85 | 1.12 | – |
| Turnout | | 7,601 | 38.49 | – |
| Eligible voters | | 19,749 | | |
| Conservative pickup new district. | | | | |
Source: Elections Ontario

== See also ==
- List of Ontario provincial electoral districts
- Canadian provincial electoral districts
