= Nima Shahbazi =

Canadian AI scientist

- Education: PhD Computer Science, M.Sc. Computer Engineering
- Alma mater: York University at the Lassonde School of Engineering, Sharif University of Technology, University of Toronto's Rotman School of Management
- Occupation: AI scientist
- Known for: Winning $1 million Zillow Prize

Nima Shahbazi is a Canadian AI scientist who won the $1 million Zillow Prize by creating the most accurate home valuation algorithm that beat Zillow's Zestimate by over 13 percent.

== Education ==
Shahbazi earned his PhD in Computer Science from York University at the Lassonde School of Engineering, where he studied under the supervision of Dr. Jarek Gryz and Aijun An. He earned a Master of Science in Computer Engineering from Sharif University of Technology in 2006 and completed entrepreneurship studies at the University of Toronto's Rotman School of Management in 2018.

== Career ==
Shahbazi is an expert LLMs, RAG, and MLOps, and holds a track record of delivering scalable machine learning products. He is currently the President of Mindle.ai.

Shahbazi is involved in algorithmic trading. In 2019, he was the winner of the $1 million Zillow Prize, considered as the biggest computer science or AI competition in history. He won the prize by creating the most accurate home valuation algorithm that beat Zillow's Zestimate by over 13 percent.

Shahbazi is a Kaggle Competitions Grandmaster whose models consistently rank in the Global Top 10 on the platform. He has achieved top placements in competitions including the Mercari Price Suggestion Challenge, Two Sigma Financial Modeling Challenge, and Home Depot Product Search Relevance.

Shahbazi's speaking experience includes presentations at the Kaggle Days in Toronto, and RBC Disruptors. Beyond his professional accomplishments, Shahbazi is passionate about tennis.

In 2025, he participated as a speaker at Canada AI Day, held as part of the ACM KDD conference, where discussions focused on transparency, fairness, data governance, and the societal impacts of artificial intelligence.

In 2026, Shahbazi served as a keynote speaker at the Appraisal Institute of Canada–Ontario's "Evolving With Value" Conference, where he spoke about the use of artificial intelligence in valuation and data-driven decision-making. That year, he also participated as a speaker at a reinforcement learning event hosted by Georgian, discussing developments and applications of reinforcement learning and artificial intelligence.

== Awards ==
- 2019 - Winner of the $1 million Zillow Prize
