= Mississauga—Lakeshore =

Mississauga—Lakeshore could refer to:

- Mississauga—Lakeshore (federal electoral district)
- Mississauga—Lakeshore (provincial electoral district)
