= Janusz Kozinski =

Canadian academic and engineer

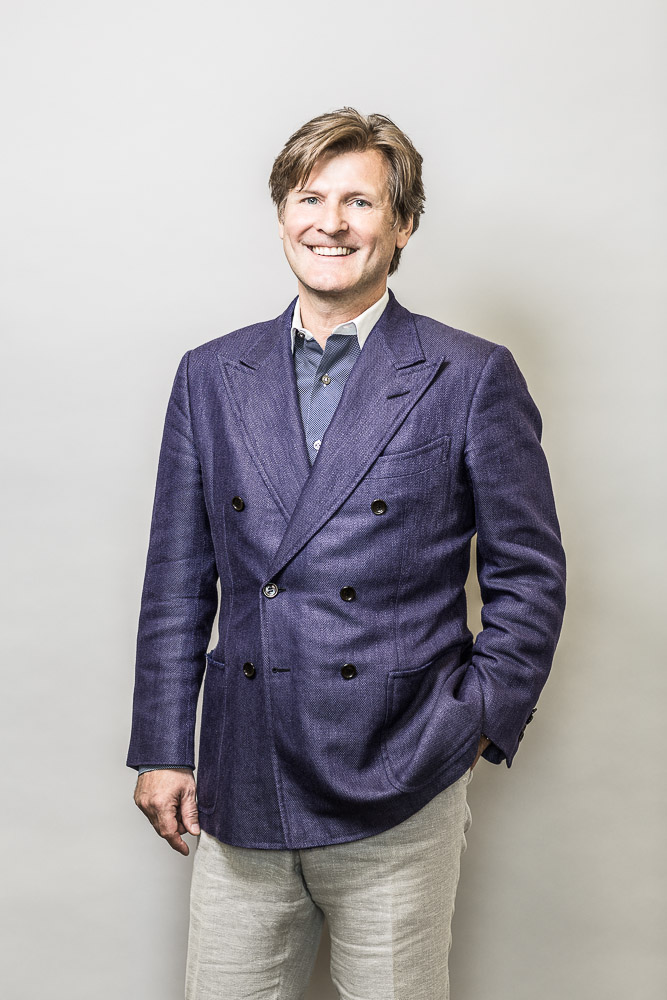
Janusz Kozinski

Janusz Kozinski is a Canadian academic and engineer in sustainable energy systems and building concepts for public safety and security.

He served as the Founding President and Vice-Chancellor of the New Model Institute for Technology and Engineering in Hereford, UK, and served as Founding Dean of Lassonde School of Engineering.

== Education ==
Kozinski graduated in 1986 from the AGH University of Science and Technology in Kraków, Poland, with a PhD in Heat Engineering & Environmental Protection. He then attended the Massachusetts Institute of Technology (MIT) and spent the majority of his academic career at McGill University, where he was a Sir William Dawson Scholar and Associate Vice-Principal of Research and International Relations.

== Academia ==
Kozinski served as Founding President and Vice-Chancellor of the New Model Institute for Technology and Engineering (NMITE) in Hereford from 2017 to 2018. NMITE aimed to be an ‘incubator of new ideas’, focused on graduating employment-ready, industry relevant, culturally intelligent, creative, ethically aware and financially literate young people. NMITE welcomed its first students in September 2021.

Prior to his position at Hereford, Kozinski served as Founding Dean of the Lassonde School of Engineering at York University. The $250 million initiative houses the Renaissance Engineering program. Renaissance engineering is a curricular philosophy that includes interdisciplinary learning, industry collaboration and designing for positive social impact. Kozinski was also formerly Dean of the College of Engineering at University of Saskatchewan and Dean of the Faculty of Science and Engineering at York University.

Kozinski held the International Chair in Bioenergy at the Institute for Advanced Studies and the Centre National de la Recherche Scientifique and has completed the Advanced Management & Leadership Program at Oxford University and the Executive Education Program, Crisis Leadership in Higher Education, at Harvard University. Kozinski is a member of the Board of Canadian Mining Innovation Council.

Janusz Kozinski formerly wrote a column for the Huffington Post Canada before its closure.

== Research ==
Kozinski has led research teams and programs relating to energy, environmental, public health, and security issues.

At Lassonde School of Engineering, Kozinski leads the Energy Lab, which focuses on research in energy generation, conversion, analysis, kinetics and management. Kozinski's research includes projects related to the next generation of nuclear reactors, the environmental impact of energy technology, greenhouse gas mitigation, fabrication of nanomaterials, public security in buildings vulnerable to bio-agents.

== Selected works ==
- Farooq, U., Kozinski, J. A., Khan, M. A., & Athar, M. (2010). Biosorption of heavy metal ions using wheat based biosorbents–a review of the recent literature. Bioresource Technology, 101(14), 5043-5053
- Fang, Z., Sato, T., Smith, R. L., Inomata, H., Arai, K., & Kozinski, J. A. (2008). Reaction chemistry and phase behavior of lignin in high-temperature and supercritical water. Bioresource Technology, 99(9), 3424-3430.
- Farooq, U., Khan, M. A., Athar, M., & Kozinski, J. A. (2011). Effect of modification of environmentally friendly biosorbent wheat (Triticum aestivum) on the biosorptive removal of cadmium (II) ions from aqueous solution. Chemical Engineering Journal, 171(2), 400-410.
- Koziński, J. A., & Saade, R. (1998). Effect of biomass burning on the formation of soot particles and heavy hydrocarbons. An experimental study. Fuel, 77(4), 225-237.
