= Douglas Kennedy (politician) =

Canadian politician

Ontario MPP
- In office 1975–1985
- Preceded by: New riding
- Succeeded by: Margaret Marland
- Constituency: Mississauga South
- In office 1967–1975
- Preceded by: New riding
- Succeeded by: Riding abolished
- Constituency: Peel South

Personal details
- Born: June 15, 1916 Cooksville, Ontario
- Died: May 27, 2003 (aged 86) Mississauga, Ontario
- Party: Progressive Conservative
- Spouse: Kathleen
- Children: 4
- Occupation: Civil servant

Military service
- Allegiance: Canadian
- Branch/service: Army
- Years of service: 1940-1945
- Rank: Captain

Robert Douglas Kennedy (June 15, 1916 – May 27, 2003) was a politician in Ontario, Canada. He served in the Legislative Assembly of Ontario from 1967 to 1985, as a member of the Progressive Conservative Party.

== Background ==
Kennedy was born in Cooksville, Ontario, to John Robert Kennedy (1883–1931) and Mary Evelyn Mabel Ellis (1890–1985). He received a Bachelor of Science degree from Ontario Agricultural College (later the University of Guelph) in 1940. He enlisted with the Canadian Army following his graduation, and served until the end of World War II in 1945. After he returned, he assisted other veterans through the Veterans Land Act. Kennedy was a trustee on the South Peel Board of Education from 1955 to 1963, and a commissioner on Toronto Township Hydro from 1963 to 1967.

Kennedy was the nephew of former Ontario premier Thomas Laird Kennedy, and the uncle of former legislator Ted Chudleigh. He and his wife Kathleen raised four children. He died in Mississauga, Ontario, and was buried at Saint John's Dixie Cemetery, Mississauga, Ontario.

== Politics ==
He was elected to the Ontario legislature in the 1967 provincial election, defeating Liberal candidate Ted Glista by 3,618 votes in Peel South. He was re-elected in the 1971 election, and returned for the redistributed constituency of Mississauga South in 1975, 1977 and 1981. He was a backbench supporter of the John Robarts, William Davis and Frank Miller administrations, and served as Chief Government Whip for a period in the 1970s. He did not seek re-election in 1985.
