= Jarek Gryz =

Computer scientist, author

- Occupations: Computer scientist, data analyst, author, and academic

Academic background
- Education: M.A. in Philosophy; MS in Computer Science; Ph.D. in Computer Science
- Alma mater: Warsaw University; University of Maryland, College Park
- Thesis: (1997)
- Doctoral advisor: Jack Minker

Jarek Gryz is a computer scientist, data analyst, author, and academic. He is a professor in the Department of Electrical Engineering and Computer Science and a member of the Cognitive Science Program in the Department of Philosophy at York University in Toronto, Canada.

Gryz's research spans the field of data analysis, query optimization, artificial intelligence, and privacy in IT systems. He authored the book Database Query Optimization with Soft Constraints and has published over 100 peer-reviewed articles, He is the recipient of the Outstanding Contribution to Internationalization Award and the IBM Faculty Award as well as a Senior Member of the Institute of Electrical and Electronics Engineers (IEEE).

== Education and early career ==
Gryz earned his MA degree in Philosophy from Warsaw University in 1989 and another MA degree in philosophy from the University of Maryland, College Park in 1992. He then shifted his subject of study and started a graduate program in the Department of Computer Science in 1993 and received a master's degree in computer science from the same institution in 1995. Subsequently, in 1996, he completed a brief internship at the Stanford Research Institute in Menlo Park, followed by a Ph.D. in computer science in 1997 under the supervision of Jack Minker, from the University of Maryland, College Park.

== Career ==
Following his Ph.D., Gryz started his academic career as an Assistant Professor and became a professor at York University in Toronto. He has also held teaching appointments at Warsaw University in Poland, Reykjavik University in Iceland, and College of William and Marry in the United States In addition, he served as the Faculty Fellow of the IBM Centre of Advanced Studies in Canada from 1998 to 2013. He holds an appointment as a professor in the Department of Electrical Engineering and Computer Science and is a member of the Cognitive Science Program in the Department of Philosophy at York University in Toronto, Canada.

== Research ==
Gryz's research has primarily focused on the field of database systems and has made contributions in various areas, including query optimization, data visualization, and data mining. Furthermore, he has explored the philosophical foundations of Artificial Intelligence.

=== Computer science ===
Gryz has worked primarily in the area of database query optimization. He proposed several techniques to improve query performance in relational databases using sampling, integrity constraints, views or a novel concept of soft constraints. Many of these algorithms have been implemented in the commercial version of DB2, IBM's relational database system. He further extended this work into other types of databases such as object-oriented, XML, and graph.

In the area of data mining, Gryz designed new algorithms for discovery of homogeneous regions in a binary matrix. He also worked on improving existing methods of frequent itemset mining. Furthermore, he branched into research on data visualization, which serves as a crucial element of analysis of massive data sets.[17].

=== Philosophy ===
Gryz's early research in philosophy focused on ethics. He examined the distinction between deontic and aretaic terms in moral vocabulary and offered a new interpretation of Stoic ethics. His interest in philosophy led to interdisciplinary research into philosophical foundations of AI, privacy in IT systems, and ethical issues, such as bias and interpretability of algorithms.

== Awards and honors ==
- 2006 – Faculty Award, International Business Machines Corporation
- 2010 – Outstanding Contribution to Internationalization Award, York International
- 2016 – Senior Member, Institute of Electrical and Electronics Engineers (IEEE)

== Bibliography ==
=== Books ===
- Database Query Optimization with Soft Constraints (2008)

=== Selected articles ===
- Gryz, J. (1999). Query rewriting using views in the presence of functional and inclusion dependencies. Information Systems, 24(7), 597–612.
- Edmonds, J., Gryz, J., Liang, D., & Miller, R. J. (2003). Mining for empty spaces in large data sets. Theoretical Computer Science, 296(3), 435–452.
- Chomicki, J., Godfrey, P., Gryz, J., & Liang, D. (2003). Skyline with presorting. In Proceedings of ICDE, 717–719.
- Godfrey, P., Shipley, R., & Gryz, J. (2007). Algorithms and analyses for maximal vector computation. The VLDB Journal, 16(1), 5–28.
- Yakovets, N., Godfrey, P., & Gryz, J. (2016). Query planning for evaluating SPARQL property paths. In Proceedings of the 2016 International Conference on Management of Data (pp. 1875–1889).
- Godfrey, P., Gryz, J., & Lasek, P. (2016). Interactive visualization of large data sets. IEEE transactions on knowledge and data engineering, 28(8), 2142–2157.
- Gryz, J., & Rojszczak, M. (2021). Black box algorithms and the rights of individuals: No easy solution to the" explainability" problem. Internet Policy Review, 10(2), 1–24.
