= Jang-Mei Wu =

Taiwanese-American mathematician

Jang-Mei Wu is a Taiwanese-American mathematician specializing in complex analysis, potential theory, quasiconformal mapping, and partial differential equations. She is a professor emeritus at the University of Illinois at Urbana–Champaign.

== Early life ==
Jang-Mei Wu was born in 1948. In 1949, Wu's mother left Hangzhou with her to move to Taipei, where Wu's father was working.

== Education ==
Wu did her undergraduate studies at National Taiwan University. She completed her Ph.D. in 1974 at the University of Illinois at Urbana-Champaign. Her dissertation, An integral problem for positive harmonic functions, was supervised by Maurice Heins.

== Recognition ==
With Sun-Yung Alice Chang, Fan Chung, Winnie Li, Mei-Chi Shaw, and Chuu-Lian Terng, Wu is one of a group of six women mathematicians from National Taiwan University called by Shiing-Shen Chern "a miracle in Chinese history; the glory of the Chinese people". She was elected as a Fellow of the American Mathematical Society in the 2020 class, for "contributions to conformal and quasiconformal mapping theory and potential theory".
