= Mississauga—Lakeshore (provincial electoral district) =

Provincial electoral district in Ontario, Canada

Coordinates: 43.554°N 79.610°W

Ontario electoral district
- Location in Mississauga

Provincial electoral district
- Legislature: Legislative Assembly of Ontario
MPP
Rudy Cuzzetto
Progressive Conservative
- District created: 1975
- First contested: 1975
- Last contested: 2025

Demographics
- Population (2016): 117,440
- Electors (2018): 90,469
- Area (km²): 88
- Pop. density (per km²): 1,334.5
- Census division: Peel Region
- Census subdivision: Mississauga

Mississauga—Lakeshore is a provincial electoral district in Ontario, Canada. It elects one member to the Legislative Assembly of Ontario. This riding was formerly known as Mississauga South prior to 2015.

It includes the neighbourhoods of Cawthra, Sheridan Heights, Park Royal, Clarkson, Rattray Park Estates, Lorne Park, Lorne Park Estates, Port Credit, Applewood Acres, Lakeview, and Orchard Heights. It has a population of 113,003 and an area of 61 km^{2}.

In 2003, it was defined to consist of the part of the city of Mississauga lying southeast of a line drawn from northeast to southwest along the Queensway to the Credit River, west along the Credit River, and southwest along Dundas Street West to the southwestern city limit.

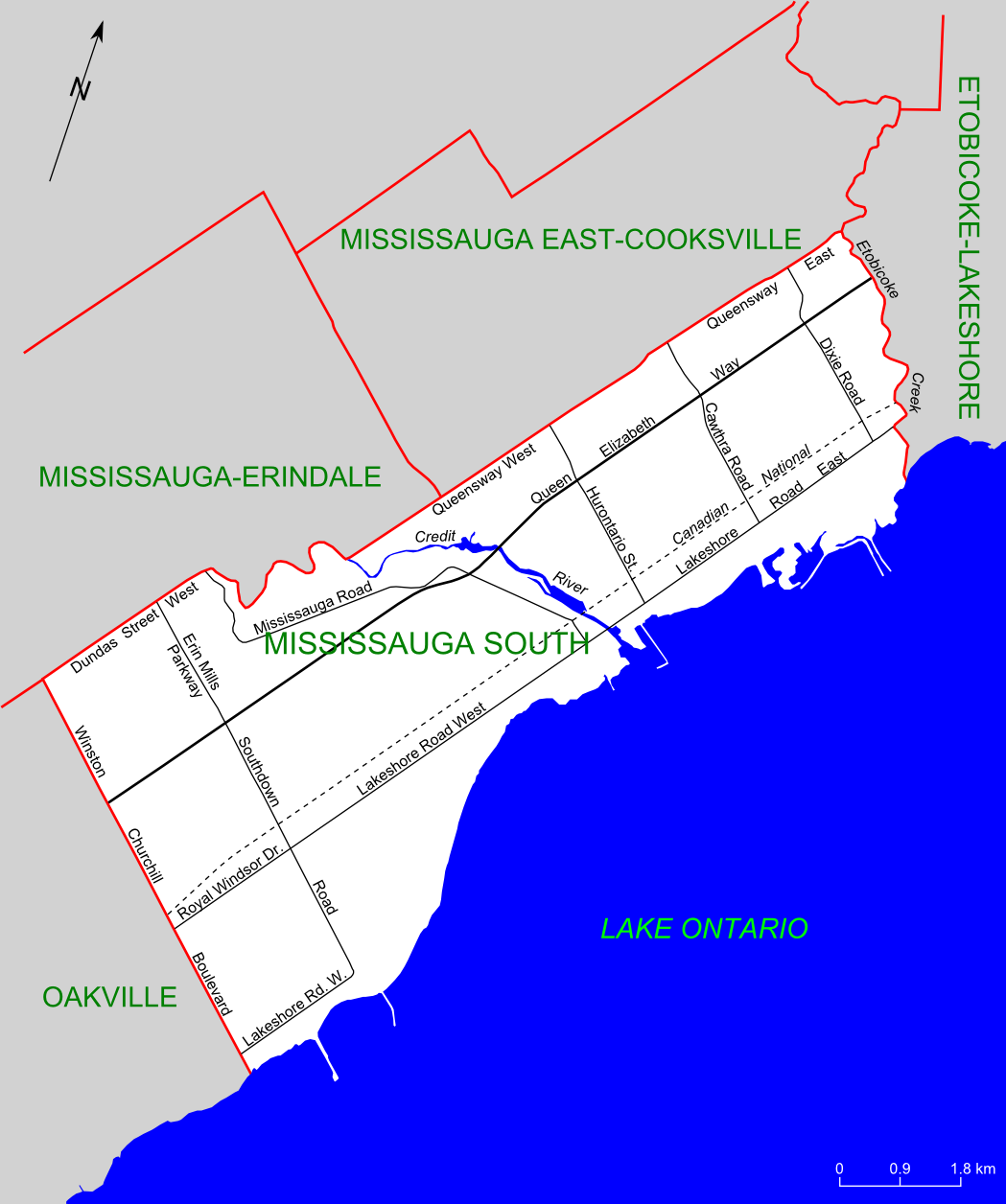
Map of Mississauga South, 2003 boundaries

== Members of Provincial Parliament ==
Mississauga South
Assembly	Years	Member	Party
Riding created
30th	1975–1977	Douglas Kennedy	Progressive Conservative
31st	1977–1981	Douglas Kennedy	Progressive Conservative
32nd	1981–1985	Douglas Kennedy	Progressive Conservative
33rd	1985–1987	Margaret Marland	Progressive Conservative
34th	1987–1990	Margaret Marland	Progressive Conservative
35th	1990–1995	Margaret Marland	Progressive Conservative
36th	1995–1999	Margaret Marland	Progressive Conservative
37th	1999–2003	Margaret Marland	Progressive Conservative
38th	2003–2007	Tim Peterson	Liberal
38th	2007–2007	Tim Peterson	Independent
38th	2007–2007	Tim Peterson	Progressive Conservative
39th	2007–2011	Charles Sousa	Liberal
40th	2011–2014	Charles Sousa	Liberal
41st	2014–2018	Charles Sousa	Liberal
Mississauga—Lakeshore
42nd	2018–2022	Rudy Cuzzetto	Progressive Conservative
43rd	2022–2025	Rudy Cuzzetto	Progressive Conservative
44th	2025–present	Rudy Cuzzetto	Progressive Conservative
Sourced from the Ontario Legislative Assembly

== Electoral history ==
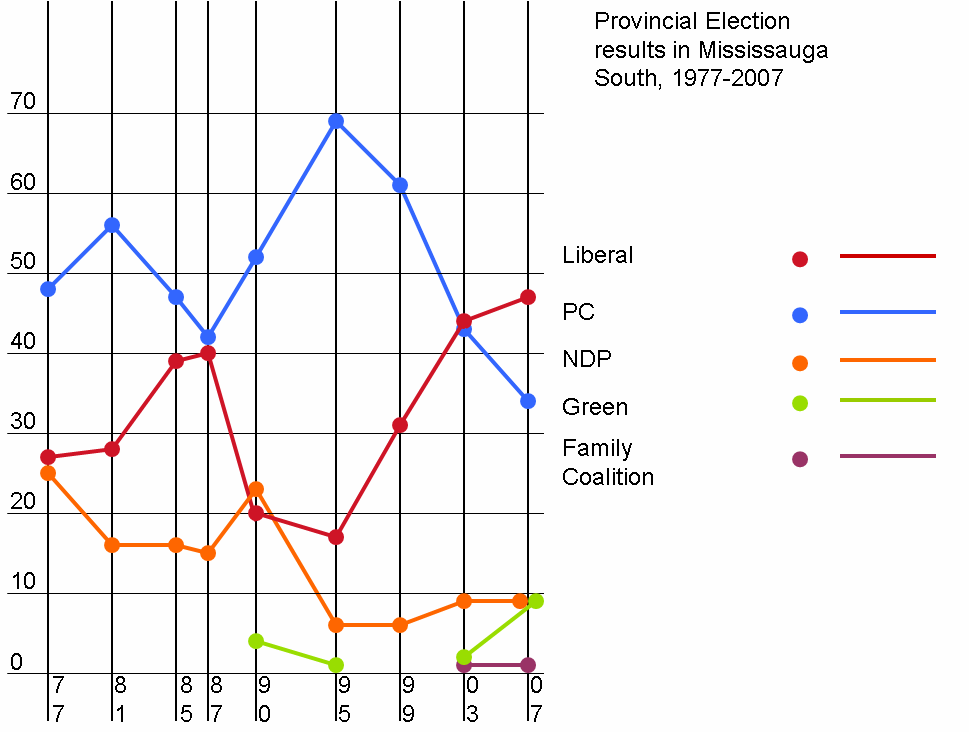
Provincial election results, 1977-2007

Mississauga South was one of the strongest bastions of PC support in the province (winning 61% of the vote as recently as 1999), but has become increasingly Liberal in recent election cycles.

=== Election results ===
Winning party in each polling division of Mississauga—Lakeshore at the 2025 Ontario general election

2025 Ontario general election
Party	Candidate	Votes	%	±%
Progressive Conservative	Rudy Cuzzetto	20,586	47.54	+2.45
Liberal	Elizabeth Mendes	18,915	43.68	+6.92
New Democratic	Spencer Ki	1,974	4.56	–3.94
Green	Julia Budahazy	1,041	2.40	–2.64
New Blue	Renata Cynarska	549	1.27	–1.09
Independent	Ayoub Bumbia	123	0.28	N/A
Moderate	Oleksii Avdeiev	113	0.26	N/A
Total valid votes/expense limit		43,301	99.47	–0.07
Total rejected, unmarked, and declined ballots		229	0.53	+0.07
Turnout		43,530	46.13	–0.82
Eligible voters		94,358		
Progressive Conservative hold		Swing		–2.31
Source: Elections Ontario

Winning party in each polling division of Mississauga—Lakeshore at the 2022 Ontario general election

2022 Ontario general election
Party	Candidate	Votes	%	±%
Progressive Conservative	Rudy Cuzzetto	19,341	45.09	+2.76
Liberal	Elizabeth Mendes	15,768	36.76	+1.73
New Democratic	Julia Kole	3,647	8.50	−9.80
Green	David Zeni	2,160	5.04	+2.08
New Blue	Renata Cynarska	1,014	2.36	
Ontario Party	George Cescon	501	1.17	
None of the Above	Brian Crombie	459	1.07	+0.39
Total valid votes		42,890	100.0	
Total rejected, unmarked, and declined ballots		197		
Turnout		43,087	46.95	
Eligible voters		91,907		
Progressive Conservative hold		Swing		+0.51
Source(s) "Summary of Valid Votes Cast for Each Candidate" (PDF). Elections Ontario. Archived from the original on May 18, 2023. "Statistical Summary by Electoral District" (PDF). Elections Ontario. Archived from the original on May 21, 2023.

2018 Ontario general election
Party	Candidate	Votes	%	±%
Progressive Conservative	Rudy Cuzzetto	22,520	42.33	+8.88
Liberal	Charles Sousa	18,636	35.03	-15.45
New Democratic	Boris Rosolak	9,735	18.30	+7.62
Green	Lloyd Jones	1,572	2.95	-0.24
None of the Above	Kenny Robinson	363	0.68	
Libertarian	Jay Ward	223	0.42	
Go Vegan	Felicia Trigiani	150	0.28	
Total valid votes		53,199	99.12	
Total rejected, unmarked and declined ballots		474	0.88	
Turnout		53,673	59.33	
Eligible voters		90,469		
Progressive Conservative notional gain from Liberal		Swing		+12.17
Source: Elections Ontario

2014 general election redistributed results
Party	Vote	%
Liberal	23,269	50.49
Progressive Conservative	15,420	33.45
New Democratic	4,921	10.68
Green	1,471	3.19
Others	1,010	2.19

==== Mississauga South, 1977–2014 ====
2014 Ontario general election: Mississauga South
Party	Candidate	Votes	%	±%
Liberal	Charles Sousa	22,192	50.76	+0.05
Progressive Conservative	Effie Triantafilopoulos	14,514	33.20	–2.89
New Democratic	Boris Rosolak	4,649	10.63	+0.57
Green	Lloyd Jones	1,418	3.24	+1.10
None of the Above	Andrew Weber	591	1.35	–
Libertarian	James Judson	355	0.81	–
Total valid votes		43,719	98.98	
Total rejected, unmarked and declined ballots		450	1.02	+0.58
Turnout		44,169	53.55	+2.30
Eligible voters		82,480		
Liberal hold		Swing		+1.47
Source: Elections Ontario

2011 Ontario general election: Mississauga South
Party	Candidate	Votes	%	±%
Liberal	Charles Sousa	20,375	50.71	+4.03
Progressive Conservative	Geoff Janoscik	14,499	36.09	+1.59
New Democratic	Anju Sikka	4,044	10.06	+0.96
Green	Cory Mogk	860	2.14	–6.68
Freedom	Mark Harris	236	0.59	–
Vegan Environmental	Paul Figueiras	165	0.41	–
Total valid votes		40,179	99.56	
Total rejected, unmarked and declined ballots		178	0.44	–0.20
Turnout		40,357	51.25	–2.83
Eligible voters		78,746		
Liberal hold		Swing		+1.22
Source: Elections Ontario

2007 Ontario general election: Mississauga South
Party	Candidate	Votes	%	±%
Liberal	Charles Sousa	19,195	46.68	+2.88
Progressive Conservative	Tim Peterson	14,187	34.50	–8.70
New Democratic	Ken Cole	3,745	9.11	–0.07
Green	David Johnston	3,629	8.83	+6.41
Family Coalition	Samantha Toteda	365	0.89	–0.52
Total valid votes		41,121	99.35	
Total rejected, unmarked and declined ballots		267	0.65	+0.08
Turnout		41,388	54.08	–2.81
Eligible voters		76,528		
Liberal hold		Swing		+5.79
Source: Elections Ontario

2003 Ontario general election: Mississauga South
Party	Candidate	Votes	%	±%
Liberal	Tim Peterson	17,211	43.80	+12.32
Progressive Conservative	Margaret Marland	16,977	43.20	–18.07
New Democratic	Ken Cole	3,606	9.18	+3.30
Green	Pamela Murray	949	2.41	–
Family Coalition	Al Zawadzki	555	1.41	–
Total valid votes		39,298	99.44	
Total rejected, unmarked and declined ballots		222	0.56	–0.11
Turnout		39,520	56.89	–0.66
Eligible voters		69,464		
Liberal gain from Progressive Conservative		Swing		+15.19
Source: Elections Ontario

1999 Ontario general election: Mississauga South
Party	Candidate	Votes	%	±%
Progressive Conservative	Margaret Marland	23,890	61.27	–8.50
Liberal	Ieva Martin	12,275	31.48	+14.73
New Democratic	Ken Cole	2,293	5.88	–4.02
Independent	Tim Sullivan	535	1.37	–
Total valid votes		38,993	99.33	
Total rejected, unmarked and declined ballots		264	0.67	–0.32
Turnout		39,257	57.55	–7.84
Eligible voters		68,212		
Progressive Conservative hold		Swing		–11.61
Source: Elections Ontario

1995 Ontario general election: Mississauga South
Party	Candidate	Votes	%	±%
Progressive Conservative	Margaret Marland	23,116	69.76	+17.31
Liberal	Ieva Martin	5,551	16.75	–3.53
New Democratic	David Messenger	3,282	9.90	–13.31
Natural Law	Scott Kay	334	1.01	–
Independent	Adrian Earl Crewson	309	0.93	–
Independent	Wolfgang G. Mueller	287	0.87	–
Green	Matthew Wood	256	0.77	–3.28
Total valid votes		33,135	99.01	
Total rejected, unmarked and declined ballots		331	0.99	–0.42
Turnout		33,466	65.39	–0.30
Eligible voters		51,180		
Progressive Conservative hold		Swing		+10.42
Source: Elections Ontario

1990 Ontario general election: Mississauga South
Party	Candidate	Votes	%	±%
Progressive Conservative	Margaret Marland	17,126	52.45	+10.21
New Democratic	Sue Craig	7,579	23.21	+8.04
Liberal	Donna Scott	6,624	20.29	–20.13
Green	Scott Reid McWhinnie	1,323	4.05	–
Total valid votes		32,652	98.59	
Total rejected, unmarked and declined ballots		468	1.41	+0.89
Turnout		33,120	65.68	+0.85
Eligible voters		50,423		
Progressive Conservative hold		Swing		+1.08
Source: Elections Ontario

1987 Ontario general election: Mississauga South
Party	Candidate	Votes	%	±%
Progressive Conservative	Margaret Marland	13,854	42.24	–2.34
Liberal	Claudette MacKay-Lassonde	13,255	40.42	+1.12
New Democratic	Barry D. Stevens	4,976	15.17	–0.95
Freedom	Chris Balabanian	712	2.17	–
Total valid votes		32,797	99.48	
Total rejected ballots		172	0.52	–0.02
Turnout		32,969	64.83	+4.99
Eligible voters		50,851		
Progressive Conservative hold		Swing		–1.73
Source: Elections Ontario

1985 Ontario general election: Mississauga South
Party	Candidate	Votes	%	±%
Progressive Conservative	Margaret Marland	13,186	44.58	–11.05
Liberal	Carolynne Siller	11,623	39.29	+11.13
New Democratic	Barry D. Stevens	4,770	16.13	–0.08
Total valid votes		29,579	99.46	
Total rejected ballots		161	0.54	–0.09
Turnout		29,740	59.85	+4.33
Eligible voters		49,692		
Progressive Conservative hold		Swing		–11.09
Source: Elections Ontario

1981 Ontario general election: Mississauga South
Party	Candidate	Votes	%	±%
Progressive Conservative	Douglas Kennedy	14,165	55.63	+7.72
Liberal	Basil Gerol	7,172	28.17	+1.38
New Democratic	Neil Davis	4,126	16.20	–9.10
Total valid votes		25,463	99.37	
Total rejected ballots		162	0.63	+0.44
Turnout		25,625	55.52	–11.50
Eligible voters		46,153		
Progressive Conservative hold		Swing		+3.17
Source: Elections Ontario

1977 Ontario general election: Mississauga South
Party	Candidate	Votes	%	±%
Progressive Conservative	Douglas Kennedy	13,622	47.91	+4.86
Liberal	Mike Garvey	7,616	26.78	–4.86
New Democratic	Ted Humphreys	7,196	25.31	–0.01
Total valid votes		28,434	99.80	
Total rejected ballots		56	0.20	–0.13
Turnout		28,490	67.02	–1.97
Eligible voters		42,511		
Progressive Conservative hold		Swing		+4.86
Source: Elections Ontario

1975 Ontario general election: Mississauga South
Party	Candidate	Votes	%
Progressive Conservative	Douglas Kennedy	11,870	43.04
Liberal	Mike Garvey	8,726	31.64
New Democratic	Danny Dunleavy	6,981	25.31
Total valid votes		27,577	99.68
Total rejected ballots		89	0.32
Turnout		27,666	68.99
Eligible voters		40,104	
Progressive Conservative pickup new district.			
Source: Elections Ontario

== Referendum results ==
2007 Ontario electoral reform referendum
Side	Votes	%
First Past the Post	26,121	65.1
Mixed member proportional	13,985	34.9
Total valid votes	40,106	100.0

== See also ==
- List of Ontario provincial electoral districts
- Canadian provincial electoral districts
