= Dorothea Sharp =

British artist (1874–1955)

- Dorothea Sharp 1940
- Born: 10 January 1873; Dartford, England
- Died: 17 December 1955 (aged 80–81); London, England
- Education: Regent Street Polytechnic
- Known for: painting
- Movement: Impressionism
- Awards: RBA Bronze Medal, 1931
- Elected: Society of Women Artists (1908); Royal Society of British Artists (1907); Royal Institute of Oil Painters (1922)

Dorothea Sharp ROI RBA (10 January 1873 – 17 December 1955) was a British artist best known for her landscapes and naturalistic studies of children at play.

== Life and career ==
Sharp was born in Dartford, Kent, the eldest of five children of James Sharp and Emily Jane (née Sturge), and christened Lydia Mary, although she preferred to be known as Dorothea. She began her training aged 21, when, after inheriting £100 from an uncle, she attended the Richmond art school run by C. E. Johnson RI. She went on to study at the Regent Street Polytechnic, where her work was admired by George Clausen and David Murray. She later went to Paris, where she encountered the work of the Impressionists – in particular Claude Monet – that was to have a profound and lasting effect on her art, resulting in the highly impressionistic and spontaneous style that she was to adopt for the rest of her life.

In 1903 she became an Associate of the Society of Women Artists, and in 1908 a full member, going on to serve as vice-president for 4 years. She was elected a member of the Royal Society of British Artists in 1907 and the Royal Institute of Oil Painters in 1922. Sharp exhibited at The Royal Academy from 1901 to 1948 and held her first one-woman show at the Connell Gallery in 1933; this was a great success and she was described as 'one of England's greatest living woman painters' by Harold Sawkins, editor of The Artist.

Sharp became a good friend to the Canadian Impressionist artist Helen McNicoll, and the two travelled together in France and Italy until the outbreak of the First World War. McNicoll died in 1915. Later, Sharp travelled with fellow artist Marcella Smith, who became a lifelong friend. Throughout the 1920s and 1930s Sharp travelled to Europe (e.g. Cassis) to paint, and also to Bosham and St Ives, Cornwall. Sharp was made an honorary member of the St. Ives Society of Artists (STISA) in 1928.

Sharp died on 17 December 1955, aged 81.
