= Bernard Epstein =

American mathematician

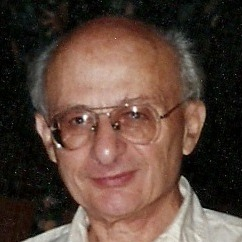
Bernard Epstein 1989

Bernard Epstein (10 August 1920, Harrison, New Jersey – 30 March 2005, Montgomery County, Maryland) was an American mathematician and physicist who wrote several widely used textbooks on mathematics.

Epstein was the son of Jewish immigrants from Lithuania and Romania, Yitzkhak Aharon Epstein and Sophie-Sarah née Goldenberg, and was the first person in his family to go to college. He received bachelor's and master's degrees in mathematics and physics from New York University and then in 1947 a Ph.D. in applied mathematics, with thesis advisor Maurice Heins, from Brown University with thesis Method for the Solution of the Dirichlet Problem for Certain Types of Domains.

In the early 1940s, he worked as a physicist at what is now the National Institute of Standards and Technology. During World War II, he was selected to join the Manhattan Project, which produced the first atomic bombs. After the war, he worked for two years at Harvard University as a research associate, taught mathematics as an associate professor at the University of Pennsylvania, Stanford University and NYU and as a professor at Yeshiva University and then spent 21 years on the faculty of the University of New Mexico as a professor of mathematics until his retirement in 1984.

Sabbaticals included Office of Naval Research, London; The Technion in Haifa, Israel; University of Maryland; and Air Force Office of Scientific Research. After retirement, he taught at George Mason University.

Epstein was dissertation advisor for the following Ph.D. students:

- Anne Scheerer, University of Pennsylvania, 1953
- William Trench, University of Pennsylvania, 1958
- Jack Minker, University of Pennsylvania, 1959
- Edwin Sherry, Yeshiva University, 1964
- Darrell L. Hicks, University of New Mexico, 1969
- Harvey Z. Senter, Yeshiva University

Upon his death at age 84, he was survived by his wife, five children, and 16 grandchildren. His sixth child, a daughter, predeceased him.

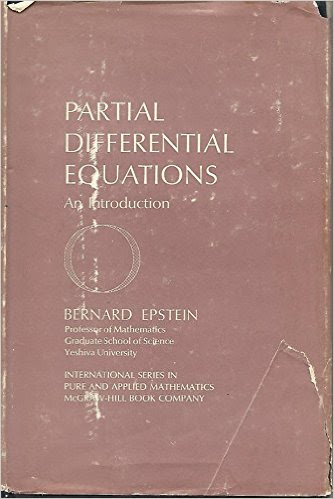
Partial Differential Equations

== Selected publications ==
=== Articles ===
- Epstein, Bernard (1947). "Some inequalities relating to conformal mapping upon canonical slit-domains". Bulletin of the American Mathematical Society. 53 (8): 813–819. doi:10.1090/S0002-9904-1947-08895-9. MR 0022259.
- Epstein, Bernard (1948). "A method for the solution of the Dirichlet problem for certain types of domains". Quarterly of Applied Mathematics. 6 (3): 301–317. doi:10.1090/qam/28692. JSTOR 43633676.
- with S. Bergman: Bergman, Stefan; Epstein, Bernard (1948). "Determination of a compressible fluid flow past an oval-shaped obstacle". Journal of Mathematics and Physics. 26 (1–4): 195–222. doi:10.1002/sapm1947261195.
- with J. Lehner: Epstein, Bernard; Lehner, Joseph (1952). "On Ritt's representation of analytic functions as infinite products". Journal of the London Mathematical Society. 27: 30–37. doi:10.1112/jlms/s1-27.1.30.
- with A. Scheerer: Epstein, Bernard; Scheerer, Anne (1956). "The existence of a generalized Green's function in the plane". Journal d'Analyse Mathématique. 4: 222–235. doi:10.1007/BF02787722. S2CID 124528688.
- with David S. Greenstein and Jack Minker: "An extremal problem with infinitely many interpolation conditions". Annals of Finnish Academy of Science (Soumalainen Tiedaekatamia Tomituksia), Series A:1 Mathematics 250/10, 1958.
- with F. Haber: Haber, Fred; Epstein, Bernard (1958). "The parameters of nonlinear devices from harmonic measurements". IRE Transactions on Electron Devices. 5 (1): 26–38. Bibcode:1958ITED....5...26H. doi:10.1109/T-ED.1958.14324. S2CID 51642216.
- Epstein, Bernard (1958). "The kernel function and conformal invariants". Journal of Mathematics and Mechanics. 7 (6): 925–936. JSTOR 24900650.
- with I. J. Schoenberg: Epstein, Bernard; Schoenberg, Isaac Jacob (1959). "On a conjecture concerning Schlicht functions". Bulletin of the American Mathematical Society. 65 (4): 273–275. doi:10.1090/S0002-9904-1959-10342-6. MR 0108588.
- with J. Minker: Epstein, Bernard; Minker, Jack (1960). "Extremal interpolatory problems in the unit disc". Proceedings of the American Mathematical Society. 11 (5): 777–784. doi:10.1090/S0002-9939-1960-0118853-8. MR 0118853.
- Epstein, Bernard (1962). "On the mean-value property of harmonic functions". Proceedings of the American Mathematical Society. 13 (5): 830. doi:10.1090/S0002-9939-1962-0140700-0. MR 0140700.
- Epstein, Bernard (1962). "A remark concerning the solution of the Dirichlet problem by finite differences". Mathematics of Computation. 16 (77): 110–112. doi:10.1090/S0025-5718-1962-0132199-3. MR 0132199.
- with M. M. Schiffer: Epstein, Bernard; Schiffer, Menahem Max (1965). "On the mean-value property of harmonic functions". Journal d'Analyse Mathématique. 14 (1): 109–111. doi:10.1007/BF02806381. S2CID 121605803.
- Epstein, Bernard (1966). "On a difference equation arising in a learning-theory model". Israel Journal of Mathematics. 4 (3): 145–152. doi:10.1007/BF02760073. S2CID 119940454.
- with H. Senter: Epstein, Bernard; Senter, Harvey (1967). "The three-dimensional Dirichlet problem associated with a plane lamina". Journal of Mathematics and Physics. 46 (1–4): 425–439. doi:10.1002/sapm1967461425.
- with J. R. Blum: Blum, Julius R.; Epstein, Bernard (1971). "On the Fourier transforms of an interesting class of measures". Israel Journal of Mathematics. 10 (3): 301–305. doi:10.1007/BF02771647. S2CID 120487512.
- Epstein, Bernard (1977). "Infinite divisibility of Student's t-distribution". Sankhyā: The Indian Journal of Statistics. Series B. 39 (2): 103–120. JSTOR 25052058.

=== Books ===
- Partial differential equations: an introduction. 1962. 2nd edition. 1975.
- Orthogonal families of analytic functions. 1965.
- Linear functional analysis: introduction to Lebesgue integration and infinite-dimensional problems. 1970.
- with Liang-shin Hahn: Classical complex analysis. 1996.
