= Margaret Marland =

Canadian politician

The Honourable Margaret Marland ECO

Member of the Ontario Provincial Parliament for Mississauga South
- In office 1985–2003
- Preceded by: Douglas Kennedy
- Succeeded by: Tim Peterson

Mississauga City Councillor
- In office 1978–1985
- Succeeded by: Patricia Mullin
- Constituency: Ward 2 (Clarkson, Lorne Park)

Personal details
- Born: February 15, 1934 (age 92) St. Catharines, Ontario, Canada
- Party: Progressive Conservative
- Occupation: Accountant, dental assistant
- Portfolio: Minister without Portfolio (Children issues, 1997-2001)

Margaret Marland (born February 15, 1934) is a former Canadian politician in Ontario. She was a Progressive Conservative member of the Legislative Assembly of Ontario from 1985 to 2003, and served as a cabinet minister in the government of Mike Harris.

== Background ==
Marland worked as a bank accountant and dental assistant in private life. She began her political career as a school trustee, serving on the Peel Board of Education from 1974 to 1978. From 1978 to 1985, she served as Mississauga City Councillor for Ward 2. She was also a member of the board of governors for the Oakville-Trafalgar Hospital, and served as governor of Sheridan College.

== Politics ==
Marland was elected to the Ontario legislature in the 1985 provincial election, defeating her Liberal opponent by about 1,500 votes in the traditionally Conservative riding of Mississauga South. The Tories won a minority government in this election, but were defeated in the house shortly thereafter; Marland held a number of critic's positions in opposition. Marland supported Larry Grossman for the party leadership in late 1985 (Toronto Star, 6 November 1985).

In the provincial election of 1987, she defeated Liberal candidate Claudette MacKay-Lassonde by only 599 votes to retain her seat. The Tories were reduced to only 17 seats out of 130 in this election. In early 1990, Marland was named deputy house leader of her party.

Marland was re-elected by a significant majority in the election of 1990, in which the Tories increased their standing to 20 seats. She again held a number of critic's roles in opposition.

The Tories won a majority government in the provincial election of 1995, and Marland was re-elected by a landslide in Mississauga South. She was not immediately appointed to cabinet by Mike Harris, and was defeated by Al McLean in her bid to become Speaker of the legislature. She was subsequently named chair of the Progressive Conservative caucus in recognition of her parliamentary experience.

When McLean was forced to resign in disgrace in 1996, Marland was Harris's choice to be his replacement; the legislature, however, elected Chris Stockwell to the position. On October 10, 1997, Marland was named a Minister without Portfolio in Harris's government with responsibility for Children. She was easily re-elected in the 1999 provincial election, and was dropped from cabinet on February 7, 2001.

Although known as a strong regional representative, Marland was not a major player in the Harris government, and was not brought back into cabinet by Ernie Eves when he replaced Harris as leader in 2002.

Marland was favoured to be re-elected in the provincial election of 2003, but lost to Liberal Tim Peterson by only 234 votes in a Liberal sweep of the Mississauga area.

== After politics ==
Since her defeat, she has kept largely a low profile, but made a statement critical of Tim Peterson's automatic installation as PC candidate after he crossed the floor, saying that it was "despicable the way this has been dealt with."
