= Maurice Heins =

American mathematician

Maurice Haskell Heins (19 November 1915, Boston – 4 June 2015) was an American mathematician, specializing in complex analysis and harmonic analysis.

Heins received his bachelor's degree in 1937, his master's degree in 1939, and his Ph.D. in 1940, under Joseph L. Walsh, from Harvard University with thesis Extremal Problems for Functions Analytic and Single-Valued in a Doubly-Connected Region. He then worked on topological methods from 1940 to 1942 as Marston Morse's assistant at the Institute for Advanced Study in Princeton. Heins was from 1942 to 1944 an assistant professor at the Illinois Institute of Technology and in 1944–1945 an applied mathematician at the Chief Ordnance Office of the U.S. Army. In 1945 he became an assistant professor at Brown University, where he eventually became a full professor. He was a full professor at the University of Illinois at Urbana-Champaign from 1958 to 1974. From 1974 to 1986 he was a distinguished professor at the University of Maryland. He was the supervisor for 19 Ph.D. theses. His doctoral students include Bernard Epstein and Jang-Mei Wu.

In the academic year 1952–1953 Heins was a Fulbright Fellow at the Sorbonne and in 1979 a visiting professor at the University of Paris VI. In the academic year 1963–1964 he was a visiting professor at the University of California, Berkeley.

Heins was elected a Fellow of the American Association for the Advancement of Science, a Fellow of the American Academy of Arts and Sciences in 1956, and a Fellow of the American Mathematical Society in 2012. He was an Invited Speaker at the ICM in 1958 in Edinburgh.

In 1940 he married Hadassah Wagman (bachelor's degree 1939 Radcliffe). Upon his death he was survived by his widow, two children, four grandchildren, and several great-grandchildren. Albert Edward Heins, one of Maurice Heins's two brothers, was also a prominent mathematician.

== Selected publications ==
=== Articles ===
- ——— (1941). "A note on a theorem of Radó concerning the (1, m) conformal maps of a multiply-connected region into itself" (PDF). Bulletin of the American Mathematical Society. 47 (2): 128–130. doi:10.1090/s0002-9904-1941-07388-x.
- Morse, M.; ——— (1945). "Topological Methods in the Theory of Functions of a Single Complex Variable: I. Deformation Types of Locally Simple Plane Curves". Proc Natl Acad Sci USA. 31 (9): 299–301. Bibcode:1945PNAS...31..299M. doi:10.1073/pnas.31.9.299. PMC 1078825. PMID 16578170.
- Morse, M.; ——— (1945). "Topological Methods in the Theory of Functions of a Complex Variable: II. Boundary Values and Integral Characteristics of Interior Transformations and Pseudo-Harmonic Functions". Proc Natl Acad Sci USA. 31 (9): 302–306. Bibcode:1945PNAS...31..302M. doi:10.1073/pnas.31.9.302. PMC 1078826. PMID 16578171.
- Morse, M.; ——— (1945). "Topological methods in the theory of functions of a single complex variable: Deformation types of locally simple curves". Annals of Mathematics. 46 (9): 600–624. doi:10.2307/1969200. JSTOR 1969200.
- Morse, M.; ——— (1945). "Topological methods in the theory of functions of a single complex variable: Boundary values and integral characteristics of interior transformations and pseudo-harmonic functions". Annals of Mathematics. 46 (9): 625–666. doi:10.2307/1969201. JSTOR 1969201.
- Morse, M.; ——— (1945). "Topological methods in the theory of functions of a single complex variable: Cause isomorphisms in the theory of pseudo-harmonic functions". Annals of Mathematics. 47: 233–273. doi:10.2307/1969246. JSTOR 1969246.
- ——— (1946). "On the number of 1-1 directly conformal maps which a multiply-connected plane region of finite connectivity p (> 2) admits onto itself". Bulletin of the American Mathematical Society. 52 (6): 454–457. doi:10.1090/s0002-9904-1946-08590-0. MR 0016469.
- ——— (1948). "Entire Functions with Bounded Minimum Modulus; Subharmonic Function Analogues". Annals of Mathematics. 49 (1): 200–213. doi:10.2307/1969122. JSTOR 1969122.
- ——— (1952). "Riemann Surfaces of Infinite Genus". The Annals of Mathematics. 55 (2): 296–317. doi:10.2307/1969780. JSTOR 1969780.
- ——— (1953). "Studies in the conformal mapping of Riemann surfaces: I". Proc Natl Acad Sci USA. 39 (4): 322–324. Bibcode:1953PNAS...39..322H. doi:10.1073/pnas.39.4.322. PMC 1063780. PMID 16589269.
- ——— (1954). "Studies in the conformal mapping of Riemann surfaces: II". Proc Natl Acad Sci USA. 40 (5): 302–305. Bibcode:1954PNAS...40..302H. doi:10.1073/pnas.40.5.302. PMC 534125. PMID 16589477.
- ——— (1955). "On the Lindelöf Principle". Annals of Mathematics. 61 (3): 440–473. doi:10.2307/1969809. JSTOR 1969809.
- ——— (1956). "Asymptotic spots of entire and meromorphic functions". Proc Natl Acad Sci USA. 42 (11): 883–885. Bibcode:1956PNAS...42..883H. doi:10.1073/pnas.42.11.883. PMC 528359. PMID 16589966.
- ——— (1961). "A class of conformal metrics". Bulletin of the American Mathematical Society. 67 (5): 475–478. doi:10.1090/s0002-9904-1961-10643-5. MR 0130974.
- ——— (1962). "On a class of conformal metrics". Nagoya Mathematical Journal. 21: 1–60. doi:10.1017/s002776300002376x. MR 0143901.

=== Books ===
- with R. Nevanlinna and others: Analytic Functions (Conference on Analytic Functions held in 1957 at the Institute for Advanced Study, Princeton, N.J.), Princeton University Press 1960
  - Contents: On differentiable mappings, by R. Nevanlinna.--Analysis in non-compact complex spaces, by H. Behnke and H. Grauert.--The complex analytic structure of the space of closed Riemann surfaces, by L.V. Ahlfors.--Some remarks on perturbation of structure, by D.C. Spencer.--Quasiconformal mappings and Teichmüller's theorem, by L. Bers.--On compact analytic surfaces, by K. Kodaira.--The conformal mapping of Riemann surfaces, by M. Heins.--On certain coefficients of univalent functions, by J.A. Jenkins.
- Selected Topics in the Classical Theory of Functions of a Complex Variable, Holt, Rinehart and Winston 1962; Dover reprint, 2105
- Complex Function Theory, Academic Press 1968
- Hardy Classes on Riemann Surfaces, Springer Verlag 1969
