= Helen McNicoll =

Canadian impressionist painter

Helen Galloway McNicoll
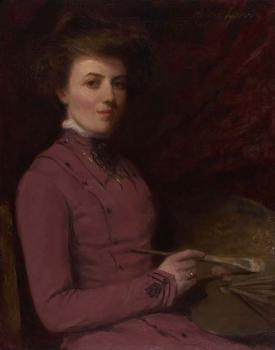
- A portrait of Helen McNicoll painted by Robert Harris, c 1910
- Born: 14 December 1879; Toronto, Canada
- Died: 27 June 1915 (aged 35); Swanage, United Kingdom
- Known for: Painter
- Movement: Impressionism
- Elected: Associate Royal Canadian Academy of Arts, Royal Society of British Artists

Helen Galloway McNicoll RBA (14 December 1879 – 27 June 1915) was a Canadian impressionist painter. She was one of the most notable women artists in Canada in the early twentieth century and achieved considerable success during her decade-long career. McNicoll played an important role in popularizing Impressionism in Canada, at a time when it was still relatively unknown, with her lively representations of rural landscapes, intimate child subjects and modern female figures. She was elected to the Royal Society of British Artists in 1913 and was created an Associate of the Royal Canadian Academy of Arts in 1914.

== Biography ==
=== Early life ===
McNicoll was born in Toronto, but raised in Montreal to an affluent family. Her parents were David McNicoll and Emily Pashley who were British immigrants. McNicoll had six siblings—three sisters and three brothers—with letters and sketches indicating that the McNicoll family was very close. McNicoll’s parents were members of Montreal’s Anglophone Protestant elite. Her father David worked in the railway industry in Scotland and England, allowing Helen to come into close contact with prominent families during the boom in Industrialism. McNicoll, with the financial support of her family through connections with renowned art collectors, was able to devote her time to painting. McNicoll's first exposure to art presumably came from observing her parents—her father did sketches during his railway travels, while her mother painted china and wrote poetry.

Despite the advantages, McNicoll developed severe hearing loss at the age of two due to scarlet fever. McNicoll navigated the social side of the art world through lip reading and assistance from friends and family. In 1899, she participated in activities at the Mackay Institution for Protestant Deaf Mutes; however, she was not listed in official school records and was not listed as deaf in the 1901 census due to misunderstandings of deaf culture in North America at this time.

=== Education and career ===
McNicoll was raised in Montreal, where she began her formal art training at the Art Association of Montreal taught by William Brymner. In 1899 she received a scholarship from the Association for her drawing of plaster casts.

From 1902 to 1904, McNicoll moved to London to study at the Slade School of Fine Art with Philip Wilson Steer; she may have met her lifelong friend Dorothea Sharp at this time. At the school, students were encouraged to paint with a naturalistic approach using en plein air. In 1905, she continued her studies at St. Ives, Cornwall, under marine painter Julius Olsson and his associate Algernon Talmage. McNicoll then moved to England to study at St. Ives in Cornwall. In 1905, she attended Julius Olsson's School of Landscape and Marine Painting studying with Algernon Talmage.

McNicoll then began her formal art education at the Art Association of Montreal (AAM) in 1906, a school with a progressive approach to teaching art by allowing female students to study the nude figure. She began to study under William Brymner, one of the first Canadian artists to study in Paris between 1878 and 1880. As a director of the AAM school, Brymner also encouraged French art trends such as sketching in plein air, naturalism, and impressionism. He also encouraged women artists to pursue professional careers and would have encouraged her.

In time, her art showed a mastery of the Impressionist style, seen in her ability to render light – even in the shadows – her simple compositions, and the poetry of her subject matter. She made her debut exhibiting six paintings at annual exhibition at the AAM; she also exhibited with the Royal Canadian Academy of Arts and the Ontario Society of Artists from 1906 to 1914. She was awarded the Women's Art Society Prize for the best oil painting for Under the Shadow of the Tent at the AAM in 1914.

McNicoll maintained a studio in London while she traveled around Europe from 1908 up until her death.

=== World War I ===
McNicoll and Dorothea Sharp were working in France when the first World War broke out. McNicoll had written to her father saying that they "would rather be here than anywhere", but due to McNicoll's ties to the Canadian Pacific Railway through her father, she was sent home.

== Personal life ==
While studying at the Slade School, McNicoll met British painter Dorothea Sharp with whom she formed a lifelong bond, nicknaming each other "Nellie" and "Dolly". The two women traveled together, shared studio spaces, and posed for each other's paintings. In McNicoll's case, having a companion was especially helpful due to obstacles she must have faced due to her hearing loss. McNicoll relied on Sharp's skills in negotiating with models—specifically children. In The Chintz Sofa by McNicoll, Sharp is depicted in their shared London studio.

== Death and legacy ==
McNicoll died in Swanage, Dorset, at the early age of thirty-five due to complications from diabetes in 1915. An obituary described her as "one of the most profoundly original and technically accomplished of Canadian artists." McNicoll had contributed more than 70 works to exhibitions in both Canada and Britain. Her work would continue to be praised into the 1920s, with the Art Association of Montreal organizing a memorial exhibition of 150 of her paintings celebrating her prolific career, titled Memorial Exhibition of Paintings by the Late Helen G. McNicoll, RBA, ARCA, November 7 – December 6, 1925. The Art Gallery of Ontario (AGO) hosted an exhibition of McNicoll's work in 1999. In 2021, the Art Gallery of Ontario exhibited a show titled The Open Door: Mary Hiester Reid and Helen McNicoll and in 2023, brought together for the first time McNicoll with Mary Cassatt in an exhibition titled Cassatt — McNicoll: Impressionists Between Worlds. The two artists were understood in a more insightful way when considered together, the AGO believed.

In 2024, the exhibition Helen McNicoll: An Impressionist Journey which presented more than 65 paintings by the artist, including 25 from the collection of Pierre Lassonde, was held at the Musée national des beaux-arts du Québec (MNBAQ). The catalogue focused on the idea of travel and its repercussions on McNicoll's work.

== Style and works ==
McNicoll was consistently recognized in Canada for her treatment of light and air, bold use of color, and overall "quiet" artworks—possibly influenced by her deafness. Reviewers praised McNicoll's works for their sunny qualities. Subjects of her paintings typically included women, children, and rural landscapes.

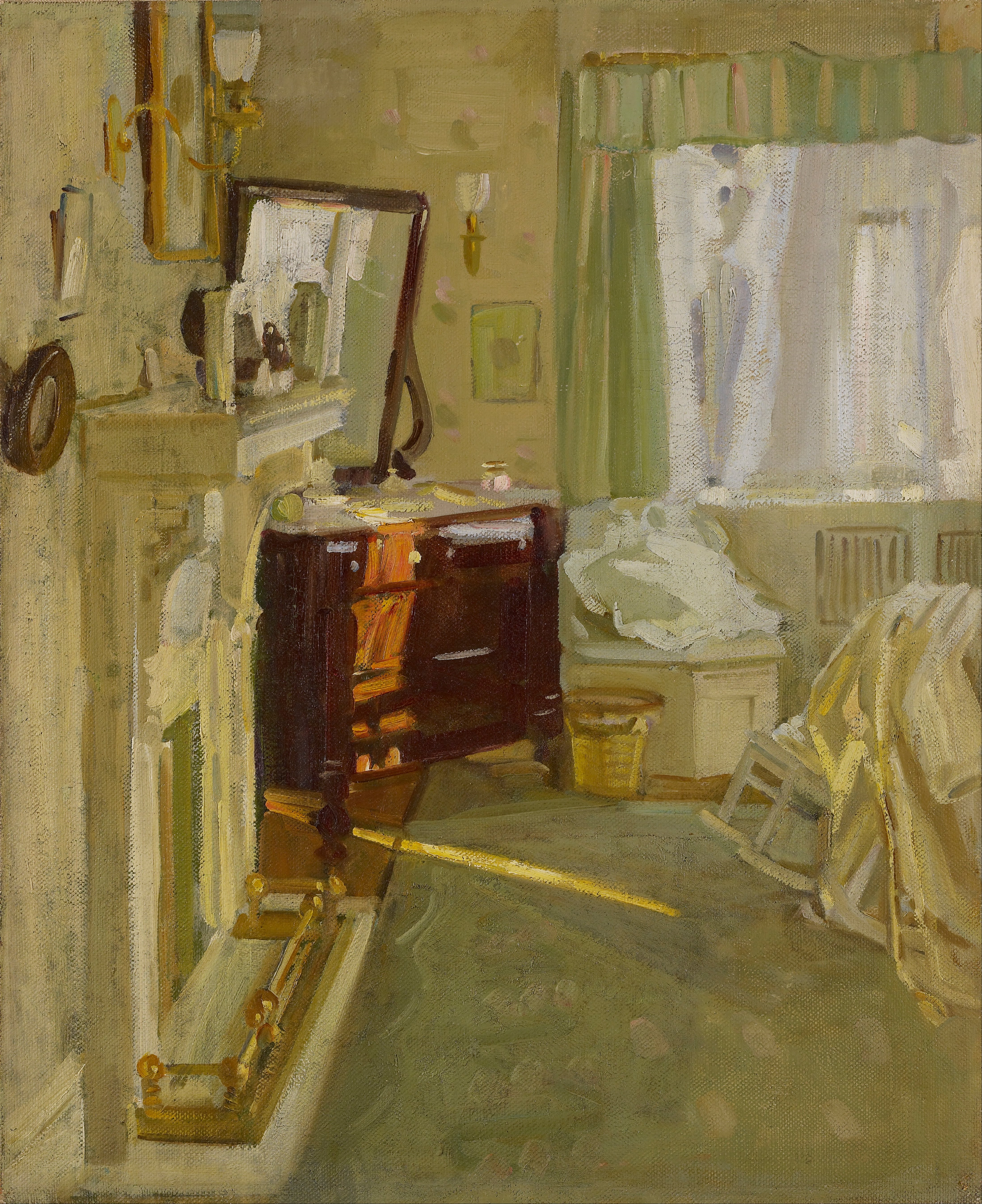
Interior, c. 1905/'15

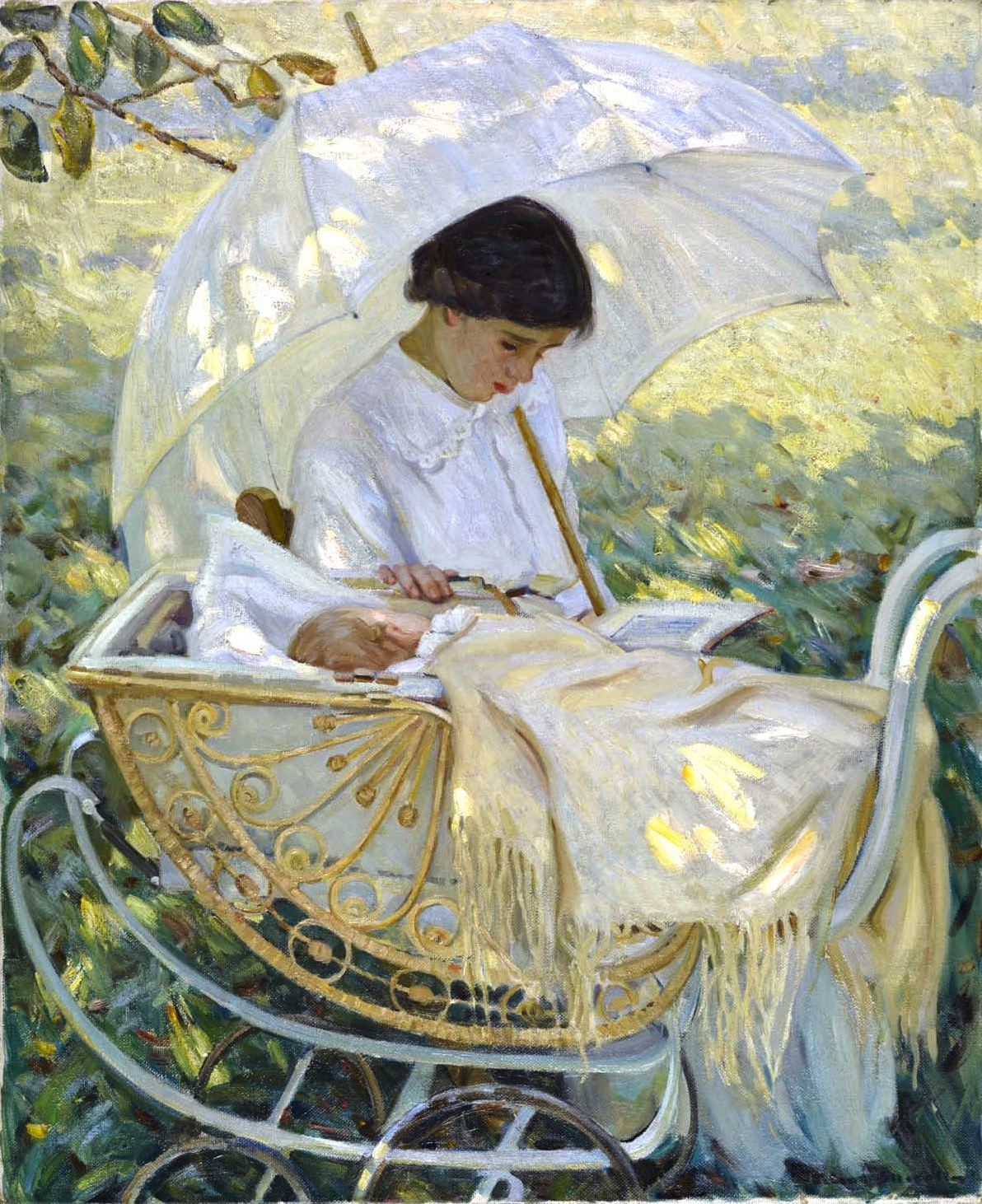
A l'ombre de l'arbre, c.1910 [100 x 81,5 cm]

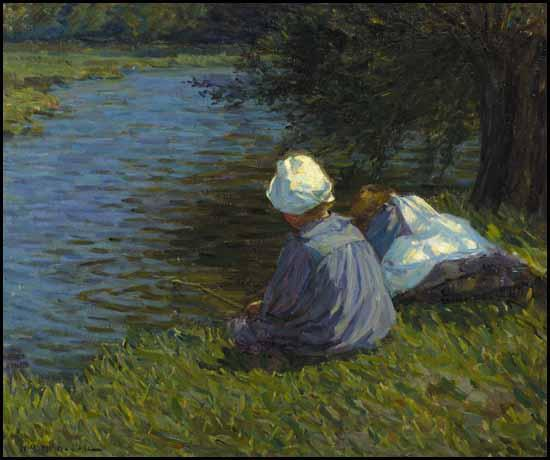
Children by stream, c. 1910

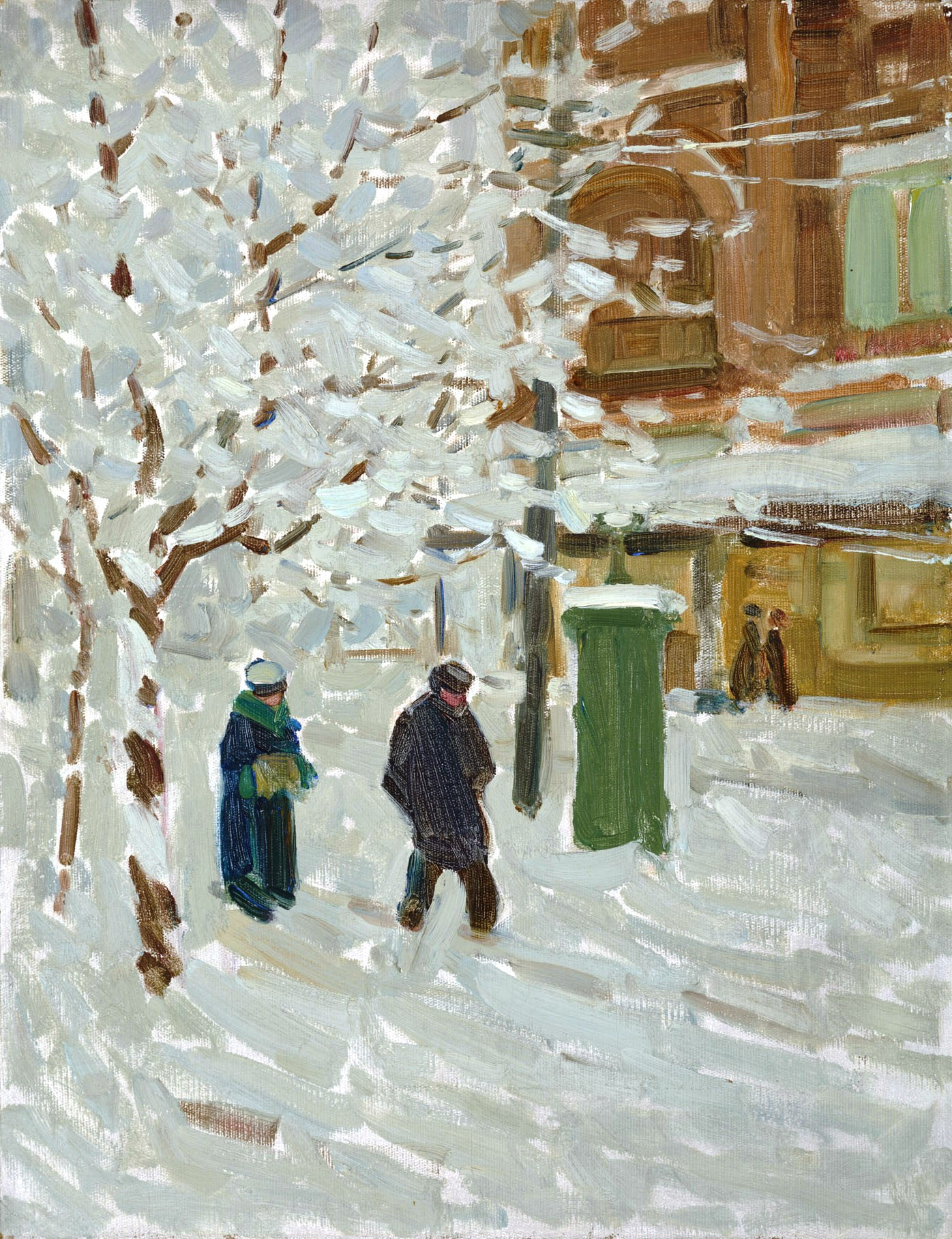
Montreal in winter, 1911

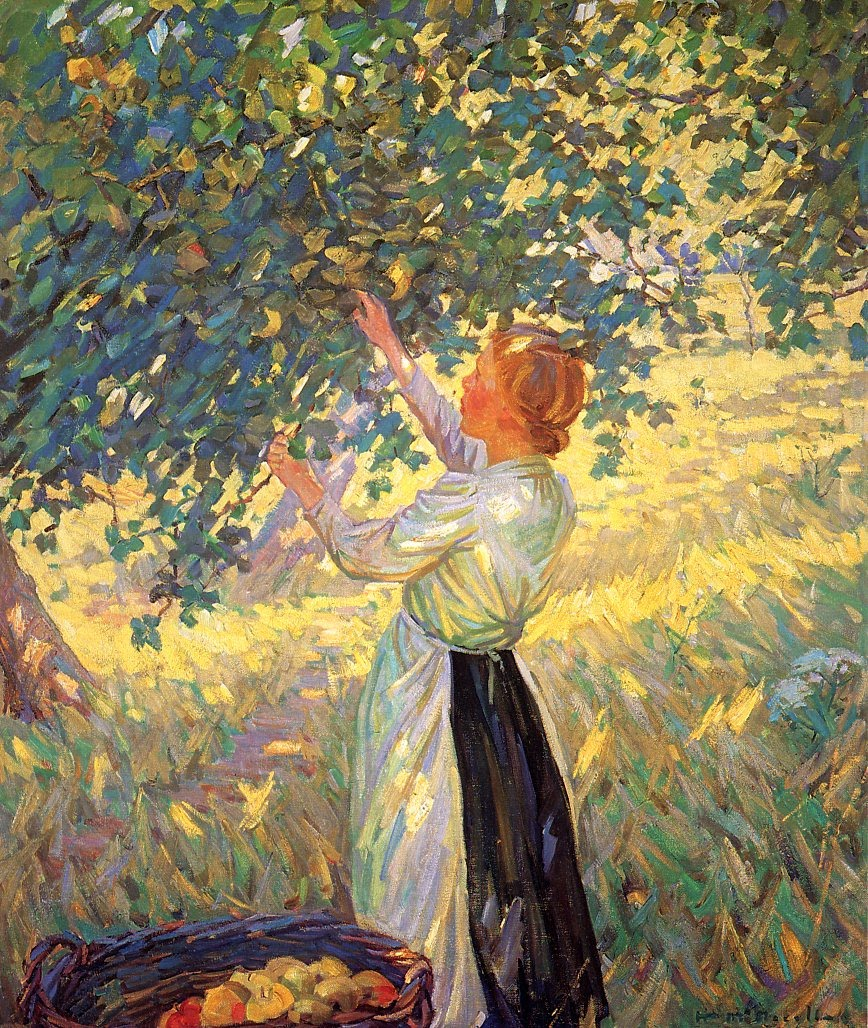
The Apple Gatherer, c. 1911 [oil on canvas, 106.8 x 92.2 cm]

Picking Flowers, c. 1912 [oil on canvas, 94 x 78.8 cm]

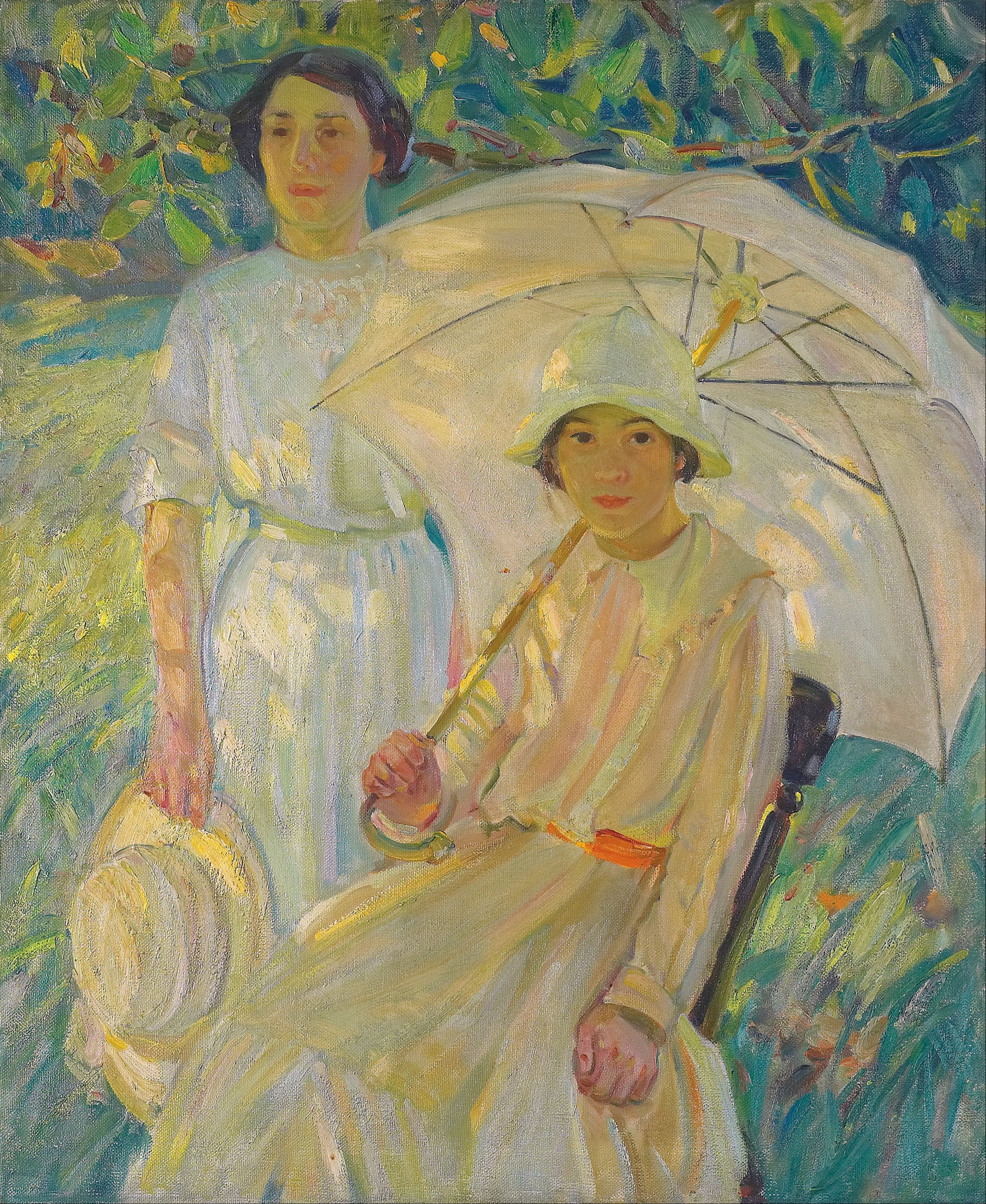
White Sunshade #2, c. 1912 [oil on canvas, 99.5 x 81.9 cm]

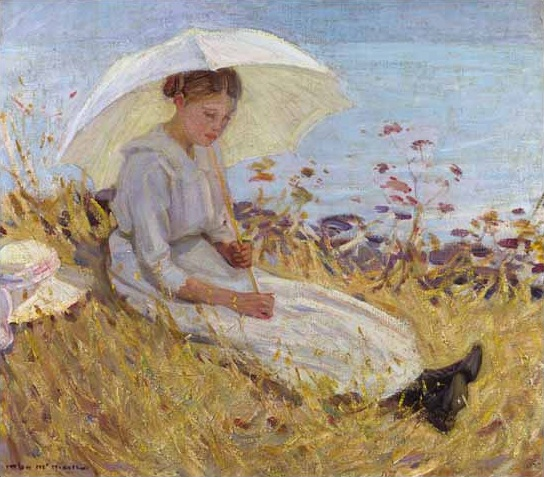
Girl With Parasol, c. 1913 [oil on canvas, 40.6 x 45.7 cm]

The Open Door, c. 1913 [oil on canvas]

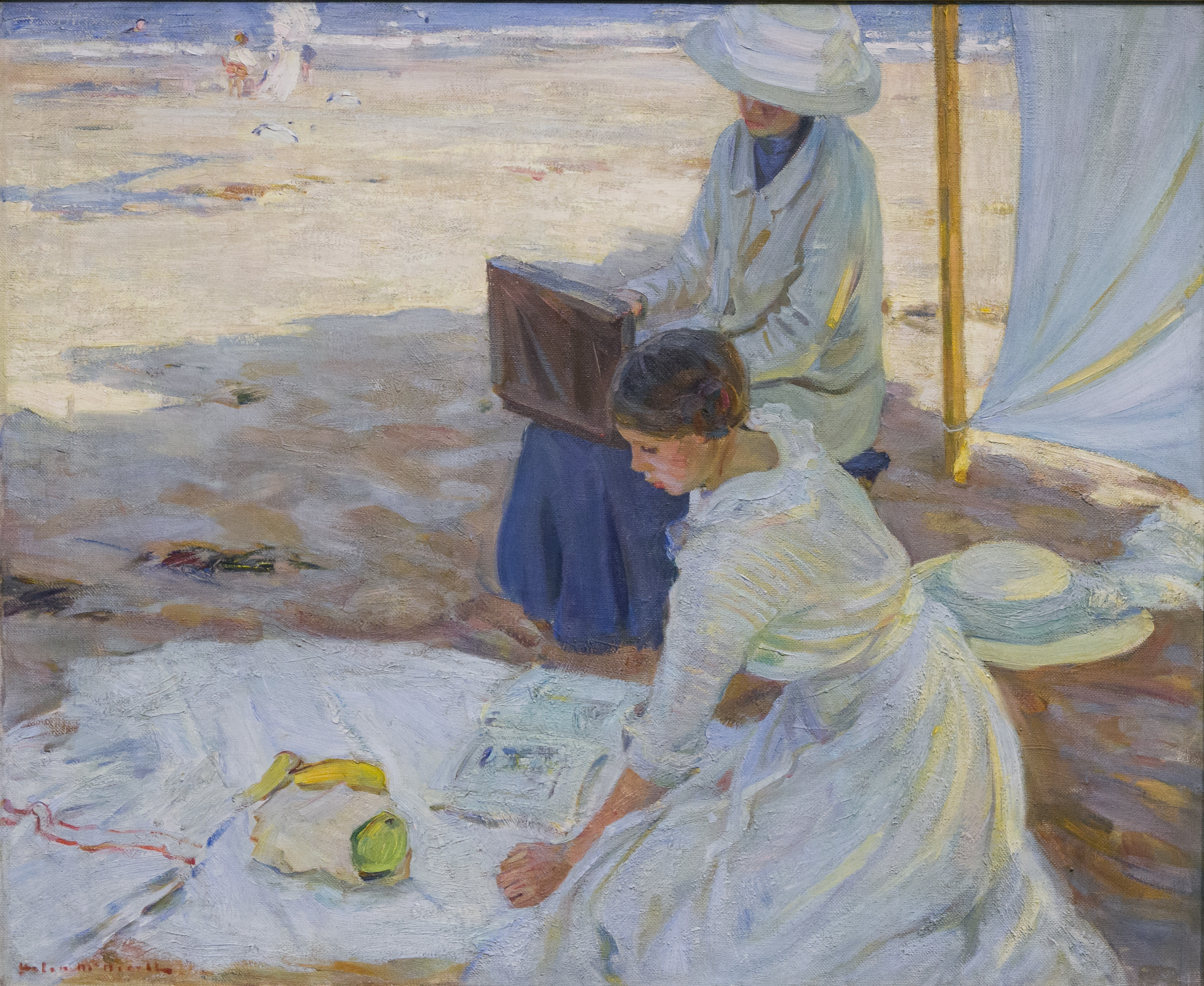
Under the Shadow of the Tent, 1914

=== Record sale prices ===
At the Cowley Abbott Auction of An Important Private Collection of Canadian Art – Part III, December 6, 2023, Lot #140, McNicoll's The Chintz Sofa, circa 1912, oil on canvas, 80.6 cm × 99.1 cm (31.7 in × 39.0 in), Auction Estimate: CAD$250,000.00 - $350,000.00, realized a price of C$888,000.00.

=== Notable collectors ===
Pierre Lassonde is a major collector of art by McNicoll.
