= Tim Peterson (politician) =

Canadian politician (born 1947)

Ontario MPP
- In office 2003–2007
- Preceded by: Margaret Marland
- Succeeded by: Charles Sousa
- Constituency: Mississauga South

Personal details
- Born: Andrew Timothy Peterson; June 6, 1947 (age 78) London, Ontario
- Party: Liberal (2003-2007); Independent (2007); Progressive Conservative (2007)
- Spouse: Mary Anderson
- Relations: David Peterson (brother); Jim Peterson (brother)
- Occupation: Banker

Andrew Timothy Peterson (born June 6, 1947) is a former politician in Ontario, Canada. He was a member of the Legislative Assembly of Ontario from 2003 to 2007 representing the Greater Toronto Area riding of Mississauga South.

== Background ==
Peterson has a Bachelor of Arts degree in economics from the University of Western Ontario. He is a director of Northern Crown Capital, Inc. (a merchant banking firm) and has sat on the board of directors of Process Capital, Nordex Explosives and Oxygen and Prescott Paper Products, as well as the Mississauga Hospital Foundation.

Peterson is the brother of two prominent Liberal politicians: former Premier of Ontario David Peterson and former federal cabinet minister Jim Peterson. He was the last of the three brothers to enter political life.

== Politics ==
Peterson was elected in the 2003 provincial election as a Liberal in the riding of Mississauga South. He beat incumbent Progressive Conservative Margaret Marland by 234 votes. The Liberals under Dalton McGuinty formed a majority government and Peterson was named parliamentary assistant to Jim Bradley, the Ontario Minister of Tourism and Recreation. In 2006 he was appointed as parliamentary assistant to George Smitherman, the Ontario Health and Long-Term Care.

On March 29, 2007, Peterson resigned from the Liberal caucus to sit as an independent. He felt the McGuinty was not paying enough attention to issues in his Mississauga riding. He stated that he would run as the PC candidate in the October 2007 election. Liberal party insiders claimed that Peterson was dissatisfied with not being given a cabinet position. Minister of Finance Greg Sorbara said, "It's just common knowledge around our caucus that Tim has been disappointed for quite some time about the role he had been assigned within our government." On June 6, 2007, he officially joined the PC caucus.

In June 2007, Peterson was acclaimed as the Ontario PC candidate for Mississauga South. However, his candidacy was not without controversy. The local riding association objected to the former Ontario Liberal member's nomination. They unsuccessfully tried to stop it. Former Mississauga South PC MPP Margaret Marland called the process "despicable".

In the 2007 provincial election for the riding of Mississauga South, Peterson ran as the Ontario PC candidate, but lost to Ontario Liberal challenger Charles Sousa.

== Later life ==
In April 2010, Peterson became a member of an advisory board for Oakville-based Sarissa Resources Inc. The mineral resource firm ceased operations after 2015.
