= Jane Goodyer =

Dean and engineering professor

Jane Goodyer is a British-New Zealand engineer and academic. As the 2nd Dean of the Lassonde School of Engineering at York University in Toronto, she is chief academic and administrative officer. Prior to joining York University, she worked at Massey University in Palmerston North, New Zealand, in various leadership roles. As a first-generation learner in higher education who has faced many personal struggles, Jane is passionate about social mobility and accessible education.

== Early life and education ==
Goodyer grew up around the Midlands in the United Kingdom and during her early years moved around from Black Patch Park of the Winson Green area of Birmingham (where there is disputed evidence that Charlie Chaplin may have been born) to Stafford, where she finished her high schooling at King Edward VI High School.

Goodyer received her First Class Honours Bachelor of Engineering degree in production engineering from Coventry Polytechnic in the U.K. She later completed her Ph.D. in manufacturing systems design engineering from Coventry University. In the years between obtaining her bachelor's and PhD, she spent several years as a production engineer working for Automotive Products, a 1st tier supplier of brakes, clutches and steering systems.

== Career ==
Goodyer started her academic career at the Faculty of Engineering and Computing at Coventry University in 1996 as a lecturer, leading to a senior lecturer. Here she worked on helping the automotive sector adjust to the European Commission's End of Life Vehicles Directive, through whole-life cost analysis and cleaner production.

In 2006, Goodyer joined the School of Engineering and Advanced Technology at Massey University in New Zealand. Her research moved into optimizing New Zealand's primary sector, utilizing manufacturing systems thinking such as lean manufacturing. At Massey University, Goodyer became Program Director and Associate Dean, Teaching and Learning, heading up the Bachelor of Engineering program. She became a protagonist for project-based learning, and continued progressing in her career to become Head of the School of Engineering and Advanced Technology. During her time at Massey University, she worked on advancing women and other underrepresented groups in engineering. In 2016, she launched an engineering outreach program for 10–14-year-old girls called Hello Café, funded by the Ministry of Business, Innovation and Employment. She also led a pilot of the degree apprenticeship model in New Zealand, funded by the Tertiary Education Commission, allowing regional towns and communities to grow their own talent.

In 2018, Jane was appointed Dean of the Lassonde School of Engineering at York University in Toronto. Continuing her work in New Zealand, she launched Canada's first Degree Apprenticeship in Digital Technologies, which is a uniquely flexible, cost-effective alternative to traditional university study that allows learners to be fully employed and gain a qualification, without going into debt. She has also launched another outreach STEM program through Lassonde's k2i (kindergarten to industry) academy, engaging youth and K-12 educators in hands-on, free STEM programs. Since 2020, k2i has reached 6,000+ individuals in 175,000+ hours of engagement and generated $5M+ in funding. They design their work alongside some of the largest and most diverse public-school boards in Canada, collaborating to dismantle systemic barriers to opportunities in STEM.

== Awards and Service Roles ==
In May 2023, Goodyer's alma mater, Coventry University, U.K., awarded her an Honorary Degree of Doctor of Technology in recognition of her outstanding contribution to engineering education and to promoting women in engineering.

Goodyer is a Fellow of the Institution of Engineering and Technology (UK, 2015), a respected Fellow of Engineering New Zealand (NZ, 2013) and has been a recognized Chartered Engineer by the Engineering Council UK, 2005.

Goodyer was appointed to the Executive Committee of the Global Engineering Deans Council (GEDC) in 2022. Created in 2008, GEDC's mission is to serve as a global network of engineering deans, and to leverage the collective strengths for the advancement of engineering education and research. In this role, she is helping pave the way for engineering leaders to network and increase the organization's membership to further its mission, vision and strategic priorities.

== Selected publications ==
- Goodyer, Jane; Soysa, Ishani B. (2017-11-27). "A New Zealand National Outreach Program – Inspiring Young Girls in Humanitarian Engineering". International Journal for Service Learning in Engineering, Humanitarian Engineering and Social Entrepreneurship. 12 (2): 1–14. doi:10.24908/ijsle.v12i2.7551. hdl:10179/13037. ISSN 1555-9033.
- Grigg, Nigel P, Jane E Goodyer, and Thomas G Frater. “Sustaining Lean in SMEs: Key Findings from a 10-Year Study Involving New Zealand Manufacturers.” Total Quality Management & Business Excellence 31.5-6 (2020): 609–622, doi:10.1080/14783363.2018.1436964
