= Pierre Lassonde =

Canadian businessman and philanthropist

Pierre Lassonde OC GOQ
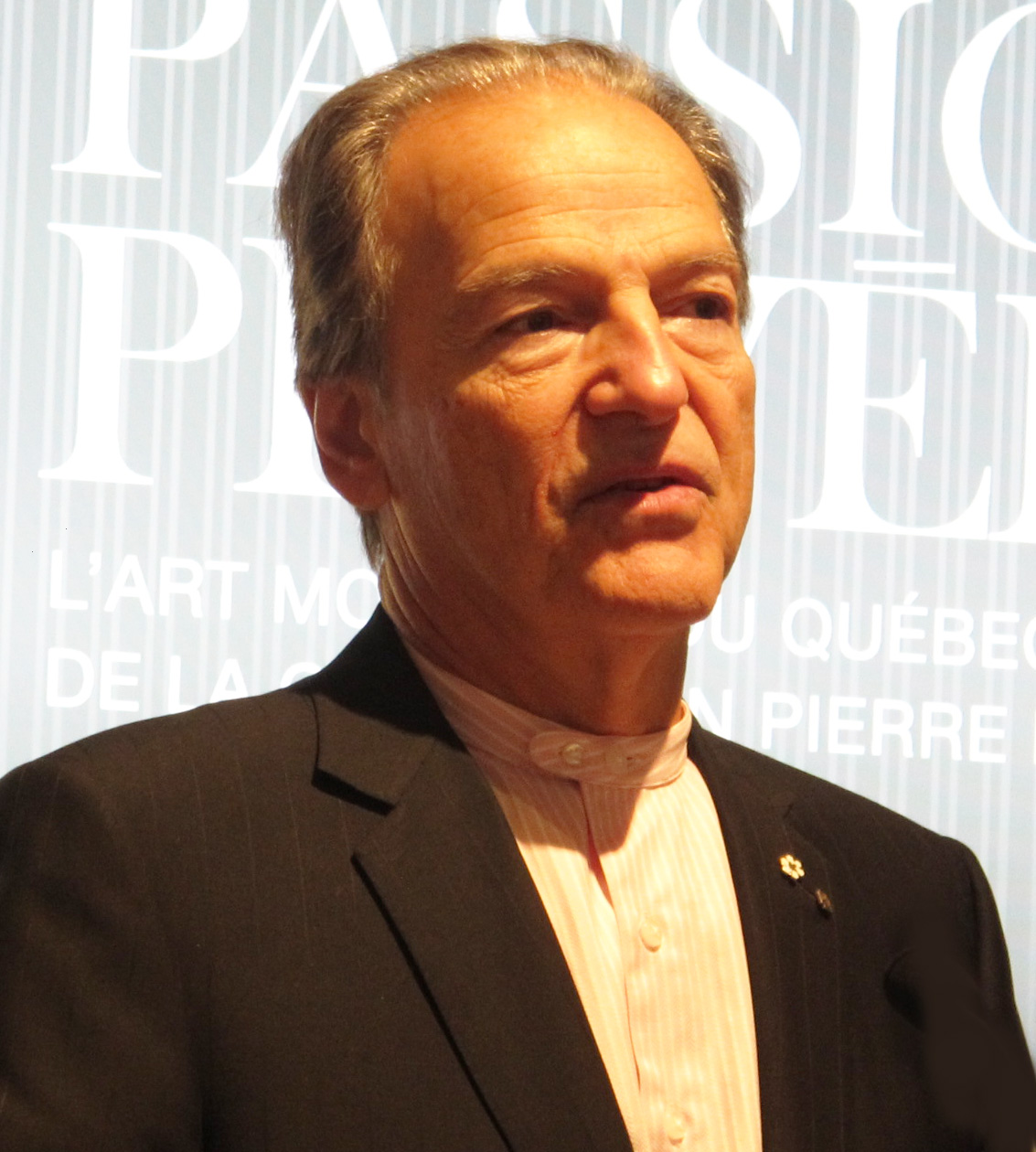
- Lassonde in 2015
- Born: April 17, 1947 (age 79); Saint-Hyacinthe, Quebec, Canada
- Education: Université de Montréal (BSc); University of Utah (MBA)
- Spouse(s): Claudette MacKay-Lassonde (1970-2000) deceased; Janelle Muntz Lassonde (2002-2022) divorced
- Children: 3

Pierre Lassonde OC GOQ (born 1947) is a Canadian businessman and philanthropist.

== Early life ==
Pierre Lassonde was born in Saint-Hyacinthe, Quebec, the third of four children. He studied at the Séminaire de Saint-Hyacinthe and graduated in 1967 with a Bachelor of Arts. He then attended the École Polytechnique de Montréal, a school affiliated with the University of Montreal, graduating with a BSc in electrical engineering in 1971. He attended the University of Utah and received his MBA in 1973. He earned his CFA designation in 1983.

== Career ==
After receiving his MBA from the University of Utah, he joined the Mining and Metals Division of Bechtel, based in San Francisco, California. In 1977, he accepted a position in the Strategic Planning Dept. of Rio Algom in Toronto, Ontario. He joined Beutel, Goodman & Company Ltd., a leading Institutional money management firm in 1980 as mining analyst and precious metal portfolio manager. There he managed the very successful Dynamic Gold Fund for a period of 10 years.

In 1982, he co-founded, along with his business partner Seymour Schulich, Franco-Nevada Corporation, the first publicly traded gold royalty company. In 1985, Franco-Nevada acquired for US$2 million a royalty on a small mining operation in the heart of the Carlin gold belt of Nevada. Two years later, the property was acquired by Barrick Gold, who discovered the world class Goldstrike deposit. From inception to February 2002, when the company was sold to Newmont Mining for US$3.2billion, Franco-Nevada provided its shareholders a 36% annualized rate of return.

Lassonde served as President of Newmont Mining Corp. from February 2002 to 2007 and vice-chairman in 2007.

In 2008, Lassonde revived Franco-Nevada by joining forces with David Harquail and the rest of the original Franco-Nevada team to acquire Newmont's royalty portfolio. The born-again Franco-Nevada became the largest mining IPO (initial public offering) ever offered on the TSE (Toronto Stock Exchange) at that time. The market capitalization of the company was more than US$25 billion in December 2020. After 35 years with Franco-Nevada, at the Annual Meeting of May 6, 2020, Lassonde stepped down as chairman and was elected Chairman Emeritus.

In 1993, Lassonde led a group of investors in another startup, Metallica Resources. The company was responsible for the discovery of the world-class El Morro deposit in Chile and the Cerro San Pedro mine in Mexico. In 2010, Metallica merged with Peak Gold and Newgold and later on with Western Goldfields Resources to create a leading mid-size gold-producing company. He left the Board of Newgold in 2014.

In 1995, Lassonde backed his wife Claudette MacKay-Lassonde in the startup of Enghouse Systems Ltd, a provider of software to the telecommunication companies. The company today has revenues of over $500 million per year and market capitalization of over $3 billion (December 2020). He is the second-largest shareholder and a Director of the company.

Lassonde remains involved in gold mining through his private family office Firelight Investment LLC. He is one of the main shareholders of Orla Mining, which he helped create, as well as companies such as America Gold and Silver, Prime Mining, and Marathon Gold.

Lassonde served as Chairman of the World Gold Council from 2005 to 2009.

In addition, Lassonde authored in 1990 The Gold Book: The Complete Investment Guide to Precious Metals.

== Philanthropy ==
Lassonde is an active and engaged philanthropist in both Canada and the United States in the fields of education, the arts and the community in which he lives. His donations total over $100 million and have gone to create iconic programs such as the Lassonde Entrepreneur Institute and Lassonde Studios at the University of Utah in Salt Lake City, the Lassonde School of Engineering at York University in Toronto, the Lassonde Mining Engineering program at the University of Toronto, and scholarships in Canadian universities.

Lassonde served as chairman of the Board of the Musée national des beaux-arts du Québec from 2005 to 2016. He led the $110 million fundraising campaign for the creation of the Pierre Lassonde Pavilion dedicated entirely to Canadian art. The Pavilion has revitalized the MNBAQ as it has won numerous architectural awards over the past four years to the end of 2020.

In July 2015, Lassonde was appointed chair of the Board of the Canada Council for the Arts. Under his leadership the CCA has seen a deep transformation and board renewal that led to a doubling of the budget to $360 million by 2021. His insistence on measuring the impact of the investments has led to the CCA's recognition as a world leader in the field. His five-year term came to an end in July 2020.

In March 2020, Lassonde was named Principal and Chair of Polytechnique Montréal’s Board of Directors for a five-year period. Polytechnique Montréal is one of the oldest engineering school in Canada.

- CDN$5 million to the University of Toronto, in 1996 to support the creation of the Lassonde Mineral Engineering program. Additional donations between 1999 and 2005 bring the total to CDN$10 million.
- CDN$1 million to the College Marie-Clarac, in honour of his late wife Claudette MacKay-Lassonde for the creation of the Campus Claudette MacKay-Lassonde in 2001.
- US$13.25 million to the University of Utah in 2002 for the creation of the Lassonde Entrepreneur Institute with additional donations to bring the total to US$50 million.
- CDN$8 million to École Polytechnique in 2002 for the Pavillon Claudette MacKay-Lassonde and Pavillon Pierre Lassonde engineering buildings.
- CDN$5 million to the University of Western Ontario in 2006 for the Pavilion Claudette MacKay-Lassonde.
- CDN$25 million to York University in 2012 for the creation of the Lassonde School of Engineering.
- CDN$3.9 million to the Musée national des beaux-arts du Québec (MNBAQ) in 2006 and additional funds in 2007 to bring the total to CDN$10 million to the institution.
- US$1 million to Opportunity International (OI) in 2014 for the education program. Janelle Muntz Lassonde is the co-chair of this program.
- CDN$5 million to Mount Allison University in 2021 to create the Pierre Lassonde School of Fine Arts.
- CDN$50 million to Polytechnique Montréal in 2025 to fund deep tech innovation and intellectual property. Largest gift in the school's existence, according to director Maud Cohen.

== Art ==
Lassonde is a major collector of art by Helen McNicoll.

== Honours and awards ==
- Lassonde was appointed to the Order of Canada in 2002 and promoted to the rank of Officer in 2022.
- The Northern Miner's Mining Man of the Year 1997 award (with Seymour Schulich).
- Mining Developer of the Year awarded by the Prospectors & Developers Association of Canada (PDAC) in 1998.
- Engineering Medal, 1999, awarded by the Professional Engineers Ontario (PEO).
- Inco Medal, 2001, awarded by the Canadian Institute of Mining, Metallurgy and Petroleum (CIM).
- Daniel C Jackling Award 2005
- American Mining Hall of Fame, Inductee, 2005
- GJ Stokes award 2007
- Degree honoris causa have been bestowed on Lassonde from the following universities: University of Toronto (2001), University of Montreal (2002), Ryerson University (2006), Western University (2015), University of Utah (2006) and York University (2014).
- Appointed Member of the Order of Canada, 2002.
- City of Québec awarded him the insignia of the Order of Patrons, 2008.
- Appointed Officer of the National Order of Quebec 2008 and Promoted to Grand Officer of the Order 2019.
- CIM Robert Elver Mineral Economics Award, 2011.
- Award for Outstanding Philanthropist by the Association of Fund Raising Professionals, Quebec Chapter, 2011.
- Inducted into the Canadian Mining Hall of Fame in 2013.
- Award of Outstanding Achievement, Philanthropy by the Canadian Museums Association, 2017.
- Gold Medal Award, the Mining & Metallurgical Society of America, 2019.
- Edmund C. Bovey Award from Business for the Arts for a lifetime of philanthropy, 2023.
