= Terry Gaasterland =

American politician and scientist

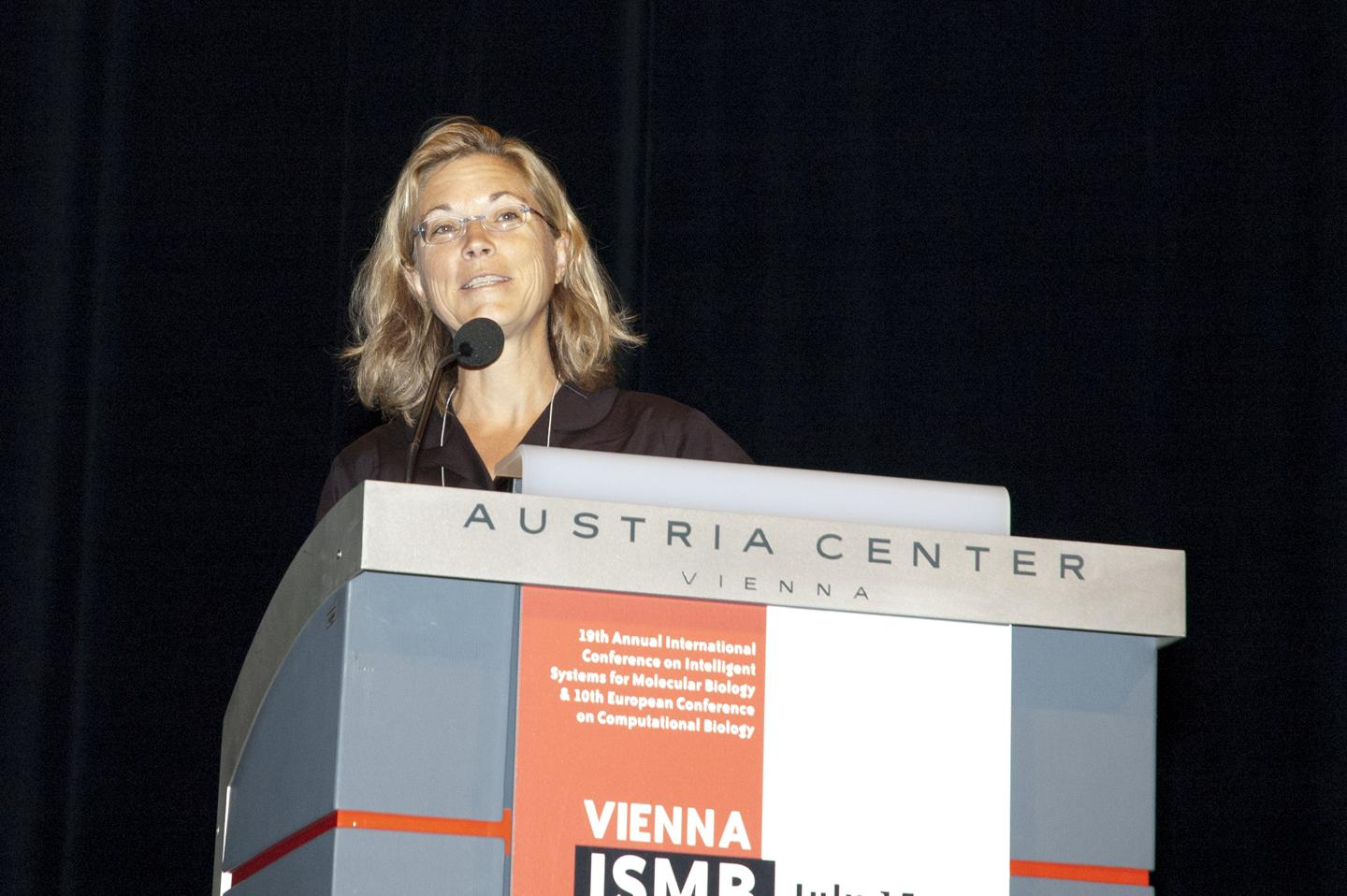
- Terry Gaasterland speaking at the Intelligent Systems for Molecular Biology (ISMB) conference in Vienna in 2011
- Born: Theresa Gaasterland; January 2, 1963 (age 63)
- Education: Duke University (BS); University of Maryland, College Park (MS, PhD)
- Awards: ISCB Fellow (2018)
- Scientific career
- Workplaces: University of California, San Diego
- Thesis: Generating cooperative answers in deductive databases (1992)
- Doctoral advisor: Jack Minker
- Website: igm.ucsd.edu/faculty/profiles/gaasterland.shtml

Theresa Gaasterland is an American politician and scientist. She is a Professor of Computational Biology and Genomics and Director of the Scripps Genome Center at the University of California, San Diego (UCSD). She was elected a Fellow of the International Society for Computational Biology (ISCB) in 2018 for contributions to the fields of computational biology and bioinformatics.

== Political career ==
She was elected to the city council of Del Mar, California in 2018, and the city council elected her to be the city's mayor in 2021. The position of mayor of Del Mar rotates among the city councilmembers. During her seventeen years as a Del Mar resident before running for office, she served on the city's finance and sea level rise advisory committees. She served a year as mayor, until, in 2022, city councilmember Dwight Worden was elected to serve as mayor.

=== Positions ===
- Gaasterland has been an outspoken opponent of SB 9 (The California Housing Opportunity and More Efficiency (HOME) Act), which was enacted to increase housing supply by allowing homeowners to build additional units on single-family lots. in 2023 as a City Councilmember, the city of Del Mar joined in a lawsuit and successfully overturned SB 9.
- Gaasterland opposes efforts by the California Coastal Commission to mandate managed retreat as a response to sea level rise in Del Mar.

=== Controversies ===
- Alleged Brown Act Violations In 2022, Gaasterland was accused by fellow Councilmember Dave Druker of violating California’s Brown Act, which prohibits a majority of a legislative body from discussing public matters outside of official meetings. Druker claimed she privately communicated with three other council members about a bluff stabilization project, potentially constituting a “serial meeting.” Gaasterland denied wrongdoing but acknowledged the perception of bias and defended the conversations as subcommittee-related.
- Short-Term Rental Conflict of Interest In 2025, the Del Mar City Council voted to refer Mayor Gaasterland to the Fair Political Practices Commission (FPPC) over concerns that she failed to disclose her own short-term rental (STR) activities while participating in crafting the city’s STR ordinance. Although she claimed her rentals were 30 days or longer, Deputy Mayor Tracy Martinez disputed this, citing a known 3-day rental and submitted leases showing 29-day terms. Critics argued this created a conflict of interest, especially since the ordinance exempted pre-existing STRs from certain restrictions. The FPPC reviewed a separate complaint from 2023 and issued a No Action Closure Letter in November 2024.
