= Claudette MacKay-Lassonde =

Canadian engineer

- Born: July 2, 1948; Montreal
- Died: June 15, 2000 (aged 51); Toronto
- Occupation: Engineer
- Spouse: Pierre Lassonde
- Children: 2

Claudette MacKay-Lassonde (July 2, 1948 – June 15, 2000) was a Canadian engineer who became the first woman president of the Professional Engineers Ontario (PEO; known until 1993 as the Association of Professional Engineers of Ontario, APEO).

== Early life and education ==
Claudette MacKay was born on 2 July 1948 in Montreal to Thérèse Dufresne and Raymond MacKay. She was the eldest of 6 children (siblings: Viviane, Gilles, Robert, Johanne, Anna). She attended the École polytechnique de Montréal where she completed her degree in chemical engineering in 1971 before going on to gain a master's degree in nuclear engineering at the University of Utah in 1973. In 1983 she graduated with an MBA from the University of Toronto.

== Career ==
Through her career MacKay-Lassonde worked for a number of companies including Xerox, Hydro Ontario, the Government of Ontario and Northern Telecom. She was on the board of Enghouse Systems Limited, AGF Group of Funds, Abitibi-Price, Clearnet Communications and Aeterna Laboratories. She was a Fellow of the Canadian Academy of Engineering.

MacKay-Lassonde was a founder of Women in Science and Engineering (WISE) and spoke at the first conference. In 1986, MacKay-Lassonde became the first woman president of the Professional Association of Professional Engineers of Ontario. During that time she created the Canadian Engineering Memorial Foundation in response to the murder of 14 engineering students at her alma mater in 1989. There is a doctoral award named in her honour. She created the Women in Engineering Advisory Committee and also chaired the Canadian Engineering Workforce Office. She was particularly involved in ensuring opportunities for women in the engineering profession. In 1987 MacKay-Lassonde ran in the 1987 general election as a Liberal. She was defeated by Margaret Marland who achieved only 599 votes more in retaining her seat.

The Claudette-MacKay-Lassonde Pavilion at Western University in London, Ontario is so named after a financial gift to fund the construction. There is a chair in Mineral Engineering at the University of Toronto named after her.

In 2021, the Claudette MacKay-Lassonde Scholarship was established at the Pierre Lassonde School of Fine Arts at Mount Allison University. The award is named in honour of MacKay-Lassonde — who beyond being an advocate for opportunities for women in engineering, was also a lover of fine arts and a painter herself.

== Personal life ==
MacKay married fellow engineer Pierre Lassonde, and added his surname to her own. They had two children: daughter Julie and son Christian.

MacKay-Lassonde died in Toronto of cancer in 2000.

== Honours and awards ==
- 1986, Doctor of Engineering, honoris causa, University of Windsor
- 1987, Doctor of Engineering, honoris causa, Carleton University
- 1989, Fellowship, Toronto Metropolitan University formerly Ryerson University
- 1990, Doctor of Science, honoris causa, St Mary's University
- 1992, Doctor of Science, honoris causa, University of Guelph
- 1992, Doctor of Engineering, honoris causa, Technical University of Nova Scotia now part of Dalhousie University
- 1993, Doctor of Science, honoris causa, Queen's University
- 1996, Doctor of Laws, honoris causa, Concordia University
