= Jack Minker =

Artificial intelligence researcher (1927–2021)

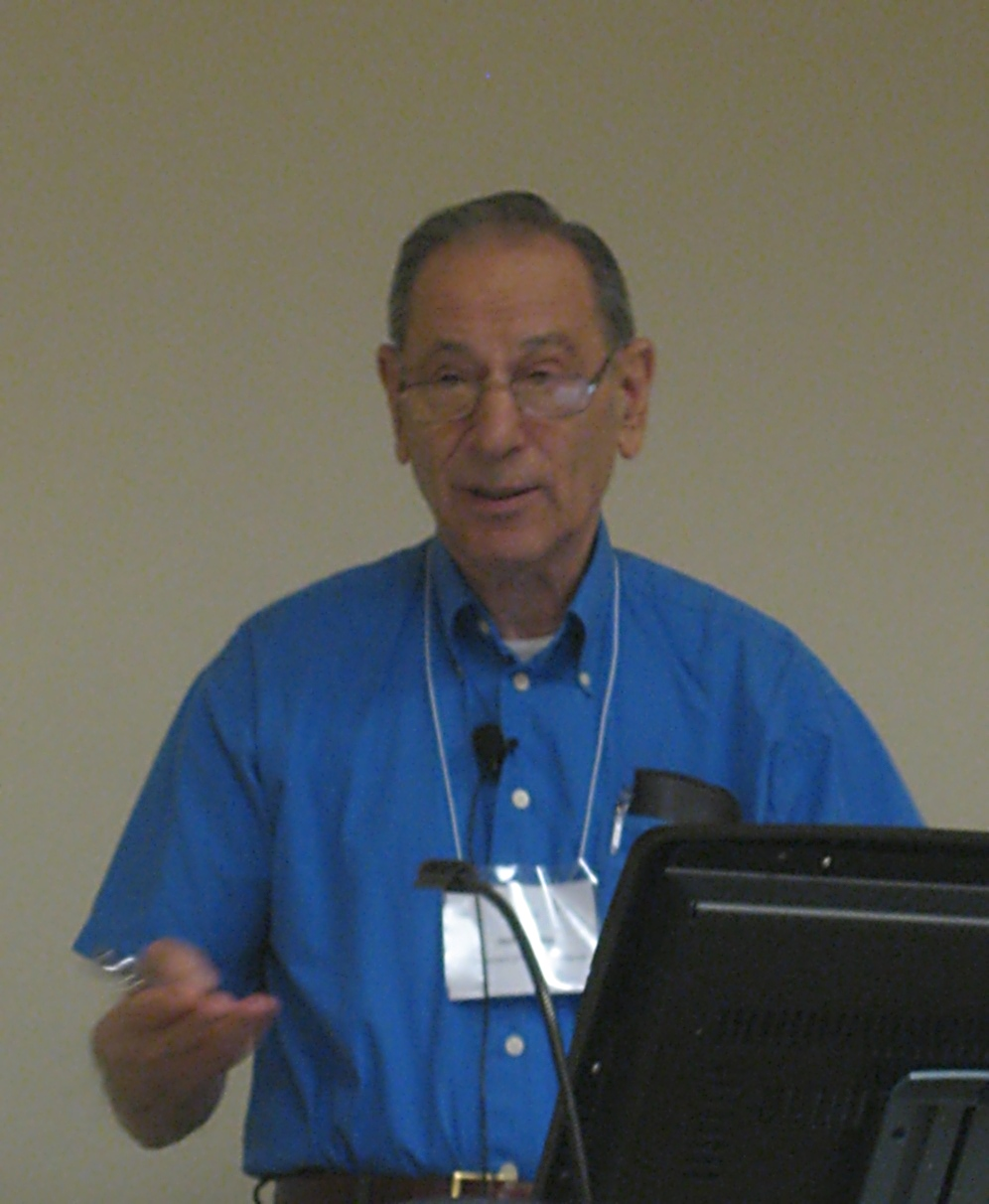
- Jack Minker in 2007
- Born: 4 July 1927; Brooklyn, New York City, New York
- Died: 9 April 2021 (aged 93); Bethesda, Maryland
- Education: Brooklyn College (AB); University of Wisconsin (MS); University of Pennsylvania (PhD)
- Awards: ACM Fellow; Allen Newell Award (2005)
- Scientific career
- Fields: Computer Science
- Workplaces: University of Maryland, College Park
- Thesis: Some Applications of Orthogonal Systems of Functions to Interpolation and Analytic Continuation (1959)
- Doctoral advisor: Bernard Epstein
- Doctoral students: Terry Gaasterland
- Website: prism.cs.umd.edu/people/minker.html

Jack Minker (4 July 1927 – 9 April 2021) was a leading authority in artificial intelligence, deductive databases, logic programming and non-monotonic reasoning. He was also an internationally recognized leader in the field of human rights of computer scientists. He was an Emeritus Professor in the University of Maryland Department of Computer Science, which is part of the College of Computer, Mathematical, and Natural Sciences.

== Education and early life ==
Minker was born on July 4, 1927 in Brooklyn, New York. He received his Bachelor of Arts degree from Brooklyn College in 1949, Master of Arts degree from the University of Wisconsin in 1950, and PhD from the University of Pennsylvania in 1959 for research supervised by Bernard Epstein.

== Career and research ==
Minker started his career in industry in 1951, working at the Bell Aircraft Corporation, RCA, and the Auerbach Corporation. He joined the University of Maryland in 1967, becoming Professor of Computer Science in 1971 and the first chair of the department in 1974. He became professor emeritus in 1998.

Minker was one of the founders of the area of deductive databases and disjunctive logic programming. He has made important contributions to semantic query optimization and to cooperative and informative answers for deductive databases. He has also developed a theoretical basis for disjunctive databases and disjunctive logic programs, developing the Generalized Closed World Assumption (GCWA).

Minker has over 150 refereed publications and has edited or co-edited five books on deductive databases, logic programming, and the use of logic in artificial intelligence. He was Founding Editor-in-Chief of the journal Theory and Practice of Logic Programming.

Minker has been vice-chairman of the Committee of Concerned Scientists since 1973, and vice-chairman of the Committee on Scientific Freedom and Human Rights (CSFHR) of the Association for Computing Machinery from 1980 to 1989. He led the struggle for the release of Anatoly Shcharansky and Alexander Lerner from the late Soviet Union. He also campaigned on behalf of Andrei Sakharov and his wife, Yelena Bonner. His memoir, Scientific Freedom & Human Rights: Scientists of Conscience During the Cold War, was published in 2012 by IEEE Computer Society Press. His former doctoral students include Terry Gaasterland.

=== Honors and awards ===
Minker was elected a Fellow of the American Association for the Advancement of Science (AAAS) in 1989, founding Fellow of the Association for the Advancement of Artificial Intelligence (AAAI) in 1990, Fellow of the Institute of Electrical and Electronics Engineers (IEEE) in 1991, and founding Fellow of the Association for Computing Machinery (ACM) in 1994.

He received the ACM Outstanding Contribution Award for his work on human rights in 1985, the ACM Recognition of Service Award in 1989, the University of Maryland President's Medal for 1996, and the prestigious ACM Allen Newell Award for 2005. The Allen Newell Award is a recognition by the Association for Computing Machinery to individuals that have contributed to the breadth of knowledge within computer science and the bridging between computer science and other disciplines. He also received the 2011 Heinz R. Pagels Human Rights Award from the New York Academy of Sciences for his work on behalf of scientific freedom and human rights for scientists.
