= Lassonde School of Engineering =

Engineering school of York University in Toronto, Ontario, Canada

- Former names: Faculty of Science and Engineering
- Motto: Passion + Perspective
- Named for: Pierre Lassonde
- Type: Public engineering school
- Established: 2011; 15 years ago
- Parent institution: York University
- Dean: Jane Goodyer
- Academic staff: 167
- Administrative staff: 116
- Students: 6,241
- Undergraduates: 5,743
- Postgraduates: 498
- Location: Toronto, Ontario, Canada
- Website: lassonde.yorku.ca

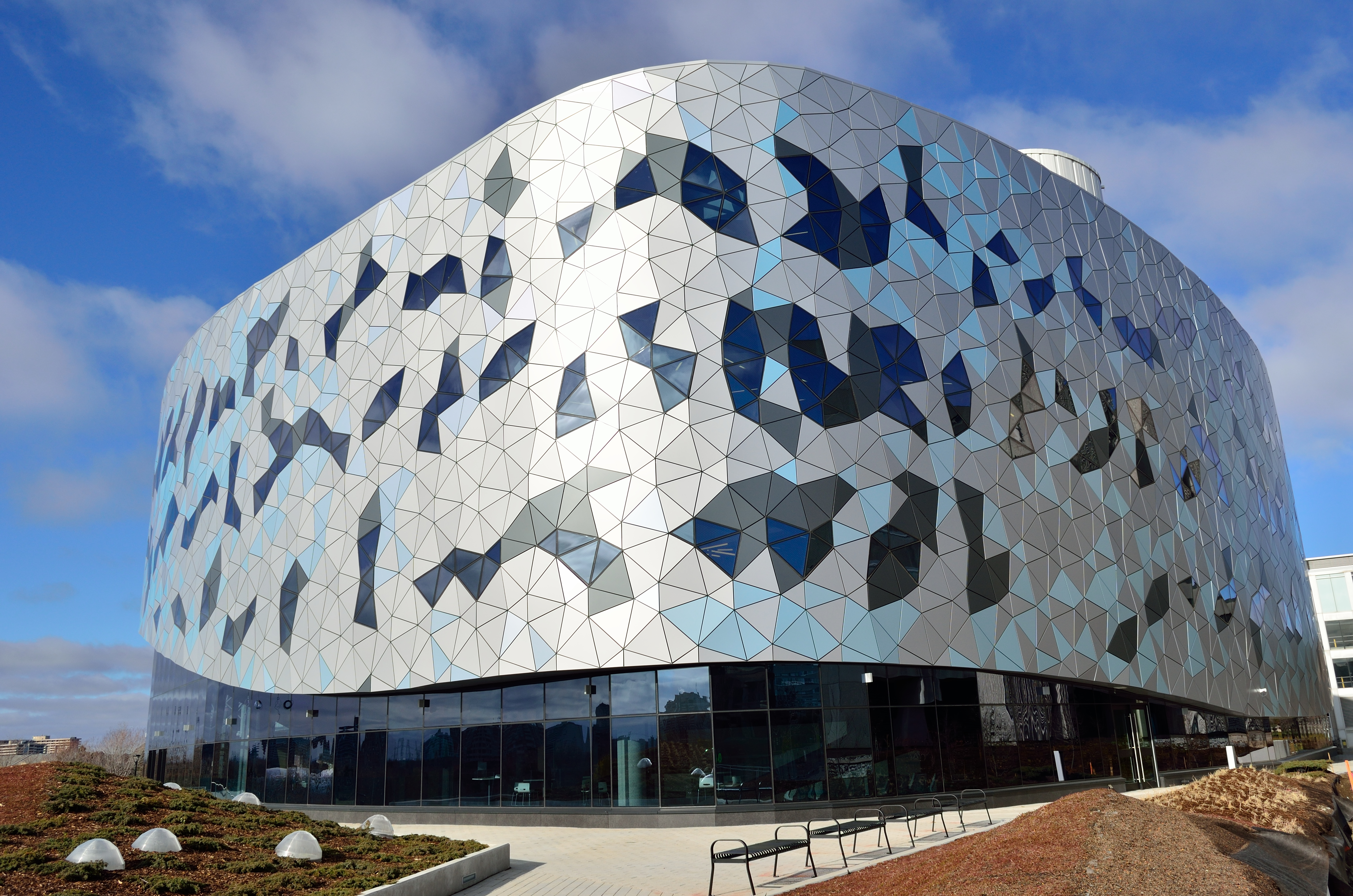
Bergeron Centre for Engineering Excellence building on Keele Campus

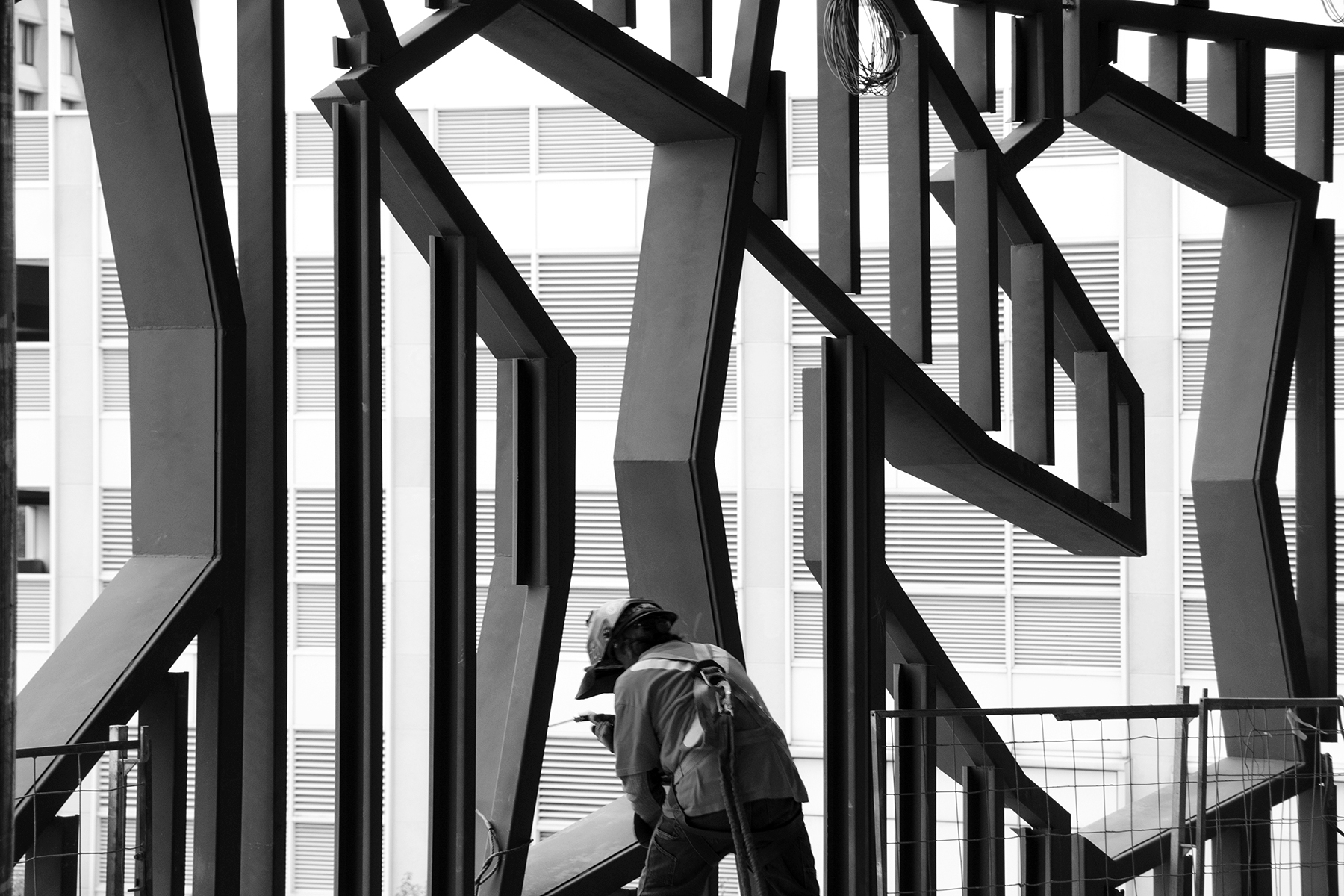
Facade installation

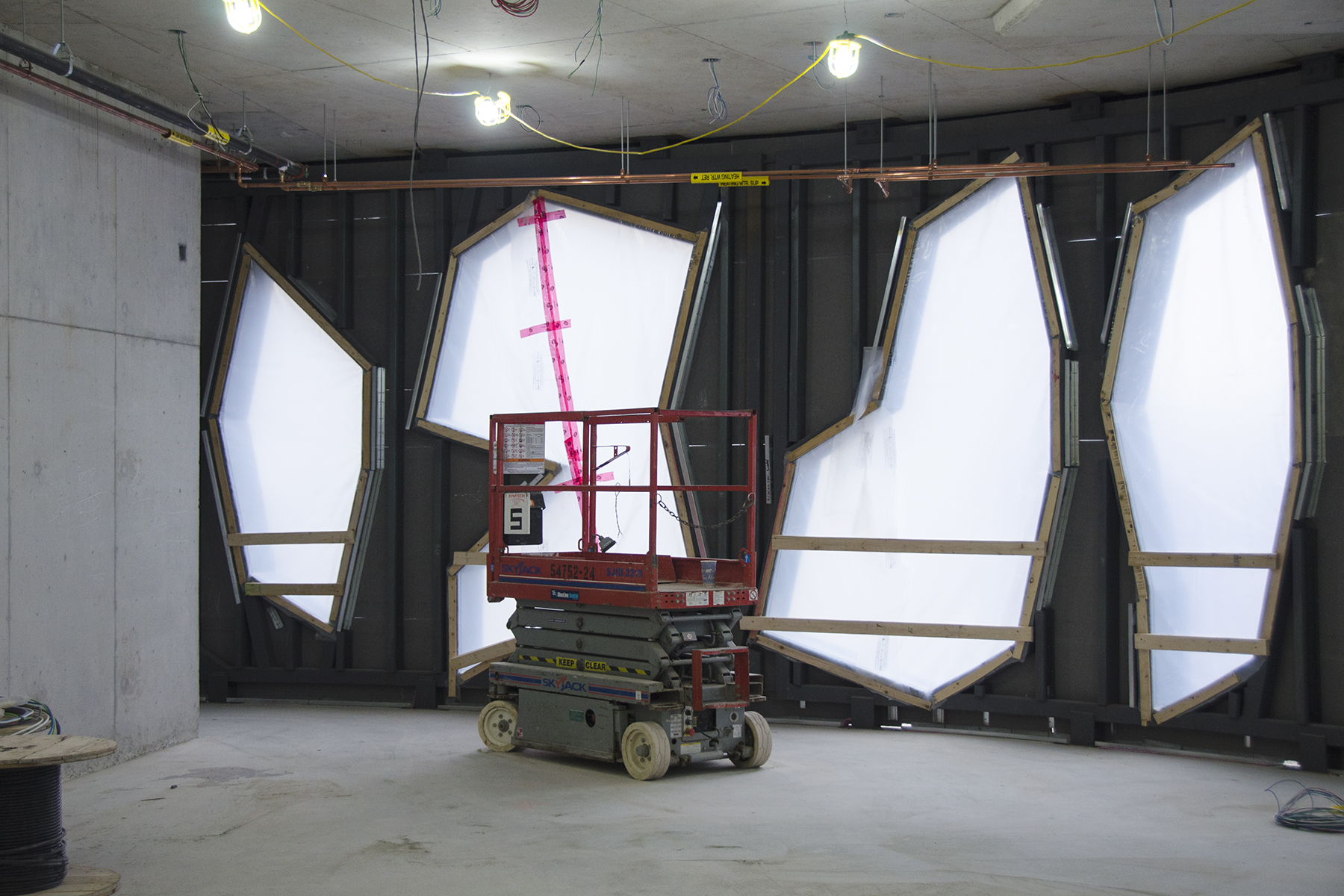
Preparation of finishes

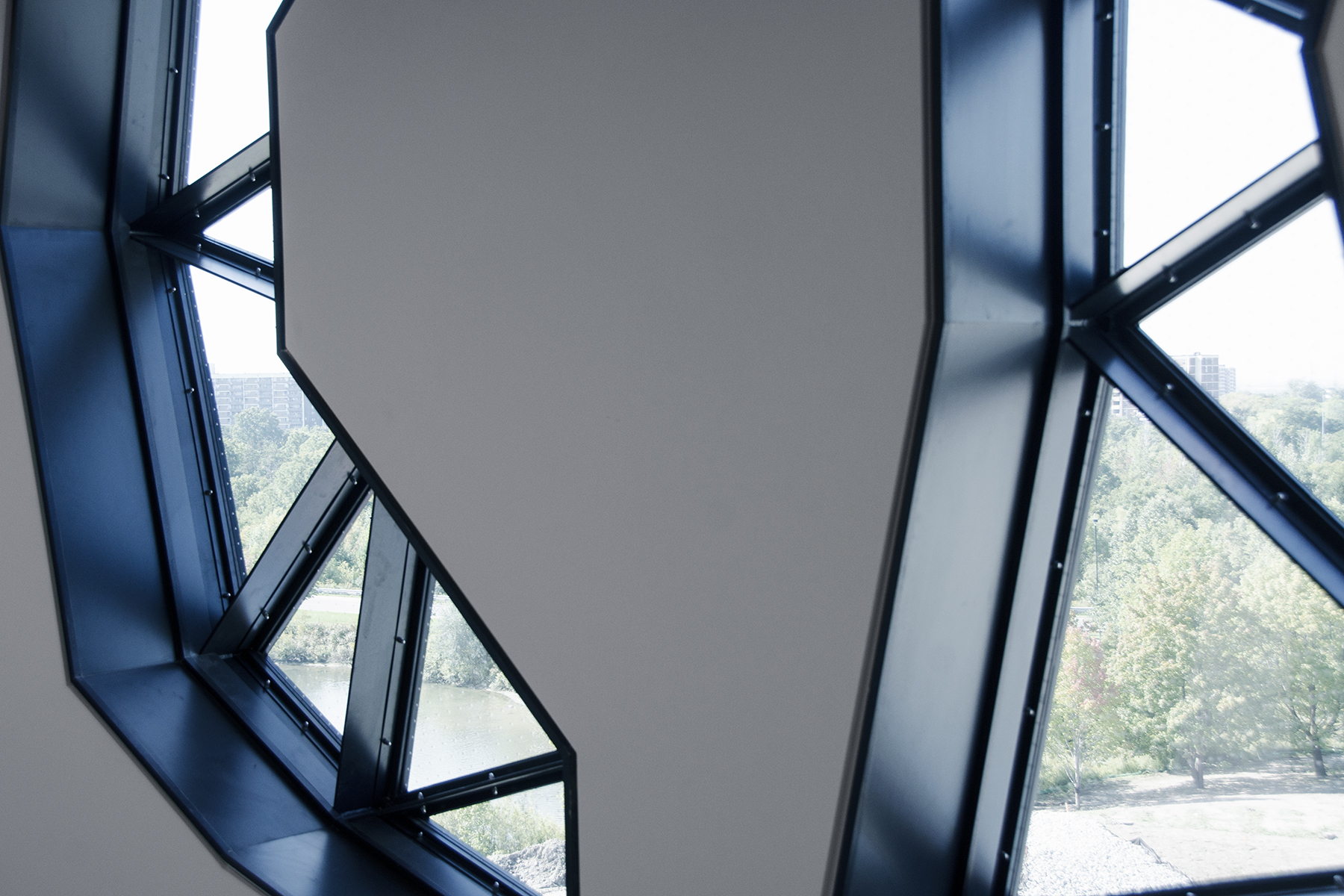
Completed facade, interior view

The Lassonde School of Engineering is the professional engineering school of York University in Toronto, Ontario, Canada. Lassonde incorporates crossover programming with York University’s Schulich School of Business and Osgoode Hall Law School to study business and law, respectively, alongside the engineering program.

The Lassonde School of Engineering was established in November 2011 with funding from founding donor Pierre Lassonde, the Government of Ontario and York University. Students from the Faculty of Science and Engineering formally joined the Lassonde School of Engineering on May 1, 2013.

On April 8, 2016, Bergeron Centre for Engineering Excellence opened. The building, designed by Greg Woods for ZAS Architects has no lecture halls and is modelled after the flipped classroom concept. The façade was designed by Dieter Janssen in collaboration with Mesh Consultants and Blackwell Engineering.

== History ==
The Lassonde School of Engineering was created in November 2011. In May 2013, students and faculty members in the Department of Electrical Engineering and Computer Science and the Department of Earth & Space Science & Engineering (both previously part of the Faculty of Science and Engineering at York University) joined the Lassonde School of Engineering.

York University officially launched its engineering programme in Fall 2001 in the Faculty of Pure and Applied Science. The first programmes were in computer, geomatics and space engineering, and engineering physics. Professor and Dean of Pure and Applied Science, Robert Prince led the development of the engineering programme, and York University's first woman Dean of Science, Gillian Wu, oversaw the next stages of development, including changing the name of the faculty to Science and Engineering in 2004. The next stage was to gain professional accreditation for the programme.

In September 2013, the first group of new first-years, comprising 397 students, joined the Lassonde School, including the first students in the new Electrical Engineering program. In September 2014, the first students in Lassonde's new mechanical engineering and civil engineering programs enrolled.

The Lassonde School of Engineering began a 50-50 initiative to have a student body that is 50% female and 50% male.

In April 2016, the Bergeron Centre for Engineering Excellence was officially opened. The Lassonde School of Engineering has a philosophy which focuses on creating "well-rounded" engineers.

In October 2015, the Lassonde School of Engineering accepted $1.5 million from IFlytek to create a neural computing and machine learning research laboratory. The same company was later placed on a Bureau of Industry and Security blacklist for allegedly enabling human rights abuses in Xinjiang with its technology.

== Undergraduate programs ==
Engineering

The following programs are accredited by the Canadian Engineering Accreditation Board:

- B.Eng - Civil Engineering
- B.Eng - Computer Engineering
- B.Eng - Electrical Engineering
- B.Eng - Mechanical Engineering
- B.Eng - Software Engineering
- B.Eng - Space Engineering
- B.Eng - Mechatronics Engineering (from Sep 2025)

Computing

- BSc, BA, iBSc, iBA - Computer Science (Accredited by the Computer Science Accreditation Council)
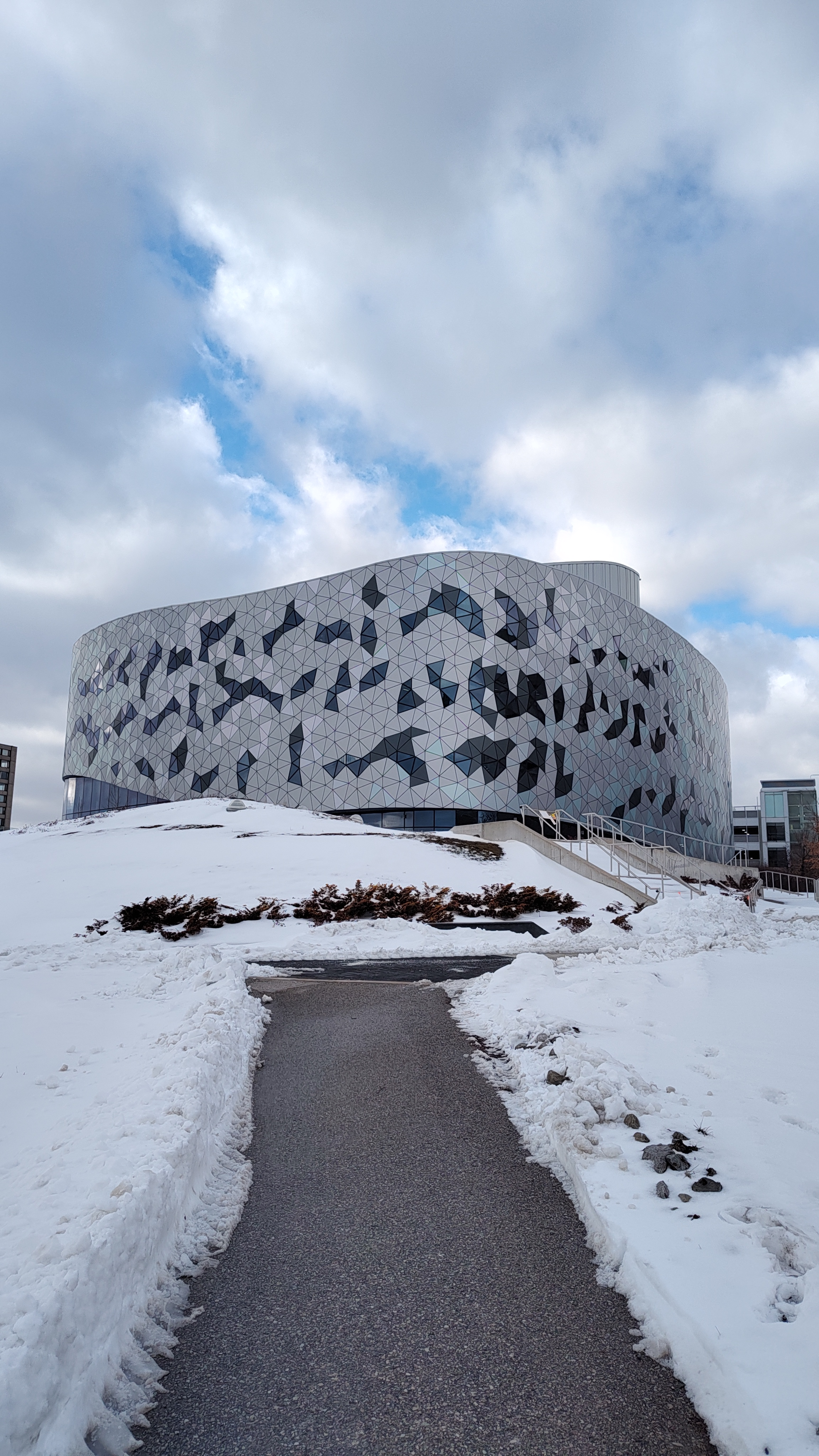
- Bergeron Centre for Engineering Excellence in winter.
  BSc, BA - Computer Security (Accredited by the Computer Science Accreditation Council)
- BA - Digital Media (offered jointly with the School of Arts, Media, Performance & Design)
- BASc - Digital Technologies

Earth & Space Science

- BSc - Earth & Atmospheric Science
- BSc - Space Science

== Graduate programs ==
- Civil Engineering (MASc & PhD)
- Computer Science (MSc & PhD)
- Electrical Engineering (MASc & PhD)
- Computer Engineering (MASc & PhD)
- Software Engineering (MASc & PhD)
- Earth & Space Science (MSc & PhD)
- Mechanical Engineering (MASc & PhD)
- Sustainable Energy Systems (MEng)

== Student life ==
There are currently two undergraduate student government bodies at Lassonde:

- Lassonde Student Congress, as the faculty student government, representing all undergraduate students to the Faculty Council and the York University Senate, and
- Lassonde Engineering Society, as the representative society for undergraduate students pursuing a B.Eng degree.

Graduate students can participate departmental graduate student associations affiliated with the York Graduate Student Association, which consist of the following:

- Civil Engineering Graduate Students Association, CEGSA
- Digital Media Graduate Students Association, DMGRADS
- Electrical Engineering and Computer Science Graduate Students Association, EECS-GSA
- Earth and Space Science Graduate Students Association, ESS
- Mechanical Engineering Graduate Students’ Association, MESA

Additionally, students can become members of and hold positions in various student organizations and clubs across campus ranging from interest groups to design teams. Some notable Lassonde affiliated student organizations are:

- York University Robotics Society, YURS
- Computing Students Hub, CSHub
- Car Society at York, CarSocY
- Women in Science and Engineering, WISE
- Civil Engineers of Lassonde / CSCE York University Student Chapter, CEL.
