= Results of the 1975 Ontario general election by riding =

- September 18, 1975

The following are the results by riding (electoral district) of the 1975 Ontario general election, that was held on September 18, 1975.

== Riding results ==
Electoral district	Candidates				Incumbent
Electoral district	PC	Liberal	NDP	Other	Incumbent
Algoma	Bernt Gilbertson; 4,588 (35.63%)	Ralph Nelson; 3,325 (25.83%)	Bud Wildman; 4,962 (38.54%)		Bernt Gilbertson
Algoma—Manitoulin	John Lane; 5,452 (40.71%)	Leo A Foucault; 3,589 (26.80%)	Winston Baker; 4,352 (32.49%)		John Lane
Armourdale	Mel Lastman; 12,100 (35.93%)	Philip Givens; 14,739 (43.77%)	M Mocciola; 6,255 (18.57%)	David Liddiard (Ind); 583 (1.73%)	Gordon Carton
Beaches—Woodbine	Tom Wardle; 7,850 (34.15%)	Ken Kory; 4,461 (19.40%)	Marion Bryden; 10,500 (45.67%)	C Negre (Comm); 178 (0.77%)	Tom Wardle
Bellwoods	Elio Madonia; 3,249 (25.19%)	Millie Caccia; 4,482 (34.75%)	Ross McClellan; 4,921 (38.15%)	RJ Orlandini (Comm); 247 (1.91%)	John Yaremko
Brampton	Bill Davis; 16,555 (43.76%)	Bill Agnew; 9,906 (26.19%)	John Deamer; 10,793 (28.53%)	AR Bullock (SC); 258 (0.68%); Robert Simms (Ind); 165 (0.44%); John MacLennan (Comm); 152 (0.40%)	Bill Davis
Brantford	Richard B. Beckett; 9,001 (29.17%)	David Carll; 9,689 (31.40%)	Mac Makarchuk; 12,048 (39.05%)	WP Small (Comm); 115 (0.37%)	Dick Beckett
Brant—Oxford—Norfolk	Don Harder; 6,572 (25.18%)	Robert Nixon; 14,379 (55.09%)	Jim Schneider; 4,791 (18.36%)	A Kerr; 357 (1.37%)	Robert Nixon
Brock	Bob Welch; 12,790 (52.28%)	Margo Fyfe; 5,704 (23.32%)	Fred Lindal; 5,969 (24.40%)		Bob Welch
Burlington South	George Kerr; 16,761 (45.49%)	Don Pennell; 11,278 (30.61%)	Bill Brown; 8,808 (23.90%)	John Lawson (Lbt); 615 (1.66%)	George Kerr
Cambridge	Ruggles Constant; 8,666 (29.04%)	Claudette Millar; 9,772 (32.75%)	Monty Davidson; 11,399 (38.20%)		New District
Carleton	Sid Handleman; 12,867 (39.29%)	Ben Franklin; 12,023 (36.72%)	Bill Brown; 8,808 (23.90%)		Sid Handleman
Carleton East	Darwin Kealey; 9,506 (28.58%)	Paul Taylor; 11,776 (35.40%)	Evelyn Gigantes; 11,981 (36.02%)		Paul Taylor
Carleton—Grenville	Donald Irvine; 12,275 (53.32%)	Howard Perkins; 5,006 (21.74%)	Reg Willis; 5,741 (24.94%)		Donald Irvine
Chatham—Kent	Darcy McKeough; 10,146 (43.69%)	Jim Cooke; 7,347 (31.64%)	Ron Franko; 5,728 (24.67%)		Darcy McKeough
Cochrane North	René Brunelle; 9,650 (61.17%)	Bernie Labonte; 2,398 (15.20%)	René Brixhe; 3,728 (23.63%)		René Brunelle
Cochrane South	Alan Pope; 9,787 (42.31%)	Wayne Keon; 2,243 (9.70%)	Bill Ferrier; 10,784 (46.62%)	Robert Cochrane (SC); 198 (0.86%); Peter Bruce (Ind); 119 (0.51%)	Bill Ferrier
Cornwall	Rudy Villeneuve; 9,246 (39.62%)	Madeleine Germain; 2,162 (9.27%)	George Samis; 11,927 (51.11%)		George Samis
Don Mills	Dennis Timbrell; 13,873 (46.35%)	Donald Wright; 7,845 (26.21%)	Bob Sherwood; 8,216 (27.45%)		Dennis Timbrell
Dovercourt	George Nixon; 4,385 (31.92%)	Agosto Venier; 3,013 (21.93%)	Tony Lupusella; 5,748 (41.84%)	William Stewart (Comm); 500 (3.64%); Hugh Yearweood (Ind); 91 (0.66%)	George Nixon
Downsview	Barbara Greene; 5,832 (26.65%)	Michael Spensieri; 7,962 (36.38%)	Odoardo Di Santo; 8,090 (36.97%)		Vern Singer
Dufferin—Simcoe	George McCague; 13,130 (45.94%)	Bob Beattie; 11,539 (40.37%)	Ian Perkins; 3,317 (11.61%)	R Cornelsen (SC); 596 (2.09%)	George McCague
Durham East	Charles McIlveen; 10,782 (41.66%)	Kirk Entwisle; 6,697 (21.91%)	Doug Moffatt; 12,824 (41.96%)	Ray Beacock (SC); 258 (0.84%)	Charles McIlveen
Durham North	Bill Newman; 11,226 (39.41%)	Clare W Morrison; 11,071 (38.86%)	Lesley Griffin; 6,189 (21.73%)		Bill Newman
Durham West	Bill Pilkington; 7,675 (26.05%)	Des Newman; 10,104 (34.29%)	Charles Godfrey; 11,539 (39.16%)	Ray Beacock (SC); 258 (0.84%)	New District
Eglinton	Roy McMurtry; 17,264 (52.30%)	Frank Judge; 10,492 (31.79%)	Eileen Elmy; 4,713 (14.28%)	Ann Harris (SC); 288 (0.87%); Donald Redekop (Ind); 252 (0.76%)	Leonard Reilly
Elgin	Ron McNeil; 11,940 (44.02%)	Marietta Roberts; 10,078 (37.16%)	Bob McNaughton; 5,104 (18.82%)		Ron McNeil
Erie	John Buscarino; 4,646 (22.40%)	Ray Haggerty; 9,185 (44.29%)	Maurice Keck; 6,906 (33.30%)		Ray Haggerty
Essex North	Fred Cada; 4,451 (20.53%)	Dick Ruston; 9,550 (44.05%)	Lucien Lacasse; 7,678 (35.42%)		Dick Ruston
Essex South	Frank Klees; 7,378 (32.11%)	Remo Mancini; 9,543 (41.53%)	Ralph Wensley; 6,058 (26.36%)		Remo Mancini
Etobicoke	Bill Stockwell; 7,134 (29.87%)	Leonard Braithwaite; 7,758 (32.48%)	Ed Philip; 8,995 (37.66%)		Leonard Braithwaite
Fort William	Jim Jessiman; 8,216 (32.77%)	Dale Willoughby; 7,449 (29.72%)	Iain Angus; 9,173 (36.59%)	Clifford Wahl (Comm); 230 (0.92%)	Jim Jessiman
Frontenac—Addington	Wilmer John Nuttall; 8,889 (38.34%)	J. Earl McEwen; 10,380 (44.77%)	Bill Barnes; 3,379 (14.57%)	Ross Baker (Ind); 539 (2.32%)	W J Nuttall
Grey	Eric Winkler; 11,349 (43.95%)	Bob McKessock; 11,637 (45.07%)	Colin L Swan; 2,835 (10.98%)		Eric A Winkler
Grey-Bruce	Gary Harron; 8,288 (34.73%)	Eddie Sargent; 14,339 (60.09%)	Lorne Creighton; 1,235 (5.18%)		Eddie Sargent
Haldimand-Norfolk	James N Allan; 12,260 (39.06%)	Gordon Miller; 14,161 (45.12%)	Norm Walpole; 4,967 (15.82%)		James N Allan
Halton—Burlington	Gary Dawkins; 10,543 (37.30%)	Julian Reed; 11,076 (39.19%)	Bill Johnson; 6,644 (23.51%)		New District
Hamilton Centre	Maurice C Carter; 5,871 (25.51%)	Bob Monte; 8,138 (35.36%)	Mike Davison; 8,778 (38.14%)	Art Walling (Comm); 226 (0.98%)	Norm Davison
Hamilton East	Bob Hodgson; 6,197 (21.21%)	Joe Rogers; 8,425 (28.84%)	Robert W. Mackenzie; 13,971 (47.83%)	Bob Jaggard (Comm); 411 (1.41%); Alcide Hamelin (SC); 207 (0.71%)	Reg Gisborn
Hamilton Mountain	John Smith; 12,668 (38.63%)	Ray C Edwards; 8,869 (27.04%)	Brian Charlton; 11,075 (33.77%)	Mike Mirza (Comm); 185 (0.56%)	John Smith
Hamilton West	Bob Morrow; 10,233 (36.27%)	Stuart Smith; 10,737 (38.06%)	Ray Fazakas; 7,243 (25.67%)		Jack McNie
Hastings-Peterborough	Clarke Rollins; 10,679 (47.19%)	Dave Hobson; 8,664 (38.28%)	Bob Thompson; 2,961 (13.08%)	Nancy Arnold (SC); 328 (1.45%)	Clarke Rollins
High Park—Swansea	Yuri Shymko; 8,442 (33.04%)	Ed Negridge; 6,440 (25.21%)	Ed Ziemba; 10,215 (39.98%)	Steve Amsel (Comm); 234 (0.91%); Ann Noble (Ind); 217 (0.85%)	Morton Shulman
Humber	John MacBeth; 17,576 (44.36%)	Alex Marchetti; 14,408 (36.36%)	Bob Curran; 7,639 (19.28%)		John MacBeth
Huron-Bruce	W E Walden; 5,955 (23.68%)	Murray Gaunt; 16,561 (65.85%)	Donald Milne; 2,635 (10.48%)		Murray Gaunt
Huron–Middlesex	Jim Hayter; 8,010 (36.72%)	Jack Riddell; 11,837 (54.26%)	Paul Carroll; 1,967 (9.02%)		Jack Riddell
Kenora	Leo Bernier; 8,907 (52.34%)	Fred Porter; 2,945 (17.31%)	Bill Watkins; 5,165 (30.35%)		Leo Bernier
Kent—Elgin	Don Luckham; 7,561 (33.46%)	Jack Spence; 12,793 (56.62%)	Ray McGaffey; 2,242 (9.92%)		Jack Spence
Kingston and the Islands	Keith Norton; 9,386 (37.54%)	Ken Keyes; 9,270 (37.08%)	Lars Thompson; 6,134 (24.54%)	Ruth Miller (Comm); 209 (0.84%)	Syl Apps
Kitchener	Bill Pernfuss; 8,396 (28.66%)	Jim Breithaupt; 13,124 (44.79%)	Meg Young; 7,367 (25.14%)	Evelina Pan (Comm); 409 (1.39%)	Jim Breithaupt
Kitchener—Wilmot	Colin O'Brian; 6,275 (25.62%	John Sweeney; 10,029 (40.95%)	M. Rosenberg; 8,184 (33.42%)		New District
Lake Nipigon	Gino Caccamo; 1,667 (15.02%)	Mike Power; 2,827 (25.47%)	Jack Stokes; 6,603 (50.50%)		New District
Lakeshore	Helen Wursta; 6,281 (22.45%)	John McPhee; 6,646 (23.76%)	Patrick Lawlor; 14,271 (51.01%)	Neil McLellan (Comm.); 602 (2.15%); Frederick Haight (Ind.); 175 (0.63%)	Patrick Lawlor
Lambton	Lorne Henderson; 11,007 (51.47%)	Fred McCormick; 9,199 (43.01%)	Maurice Payne; 1,181 (5.52%)		Lorne Henderson
Lanark	Douglas Wiseman; 11,487 (56.33%)	Gary O'Neil; 5,842 (28.65%)	George Murray; 3,066 (15.05%)		Douglas Wiseman
Leeds	James Auld; 13,913 (58.25%)	Edward Lanigan; 4,251 (17.78%)	John Fielding; 5,721 (23.95%)		James Auld
Lincoln	Paul Prince; 7,914 (37.70%)	Ross Hall; 8,983 (42.80%)	Ron Leavens; 4,092 (19.50%)		Ross Hall
London Centre	Earle Terry; 9,018 (31.37%)	David Peterson; 11,617 (40.56%)	Pat Chefurka; 7,896 (27.46%)	Agnes Shaw (Ind.); 219 (0.76%)	New District
London North	Gordon Walker; 11,334 (36.72%)	Marvin Shore; 13,962 (45.23%)	Mike Warren; 5,570 (18.05%)		Gordon Walker
London South	John Eberhard; 14,121 (39.14%)	John Ferris; 14,773 (40/96%)	Edith Welch; 7,171 (19.88%)		John White
Middlesex	Robert G. Eaton; 10,092	Maurice Platts; 9,216	H. Aitkenhead; 3,127		New District
Mississauga East	Bud Gregory; 9,948	Irene Robinson; 8,630	Larry Taylor; 6,435	Edmond Meyers (Ind.); 430	New District
Mississauga North	Terry David Jones; 11,115	Vince Zuccaro; 9,513	David Busby; 10,787		New District
Mississauga South	Douglas Kennedy; 11,839	Mike Garvey; 8,756	Danny Dunleavy; 7,102		New District
Muskoka	Frank Miller; 7,037	Peggie Fitzpatrick; 3,262	Ken Cargill; 5,760	William Triska (SC); 149	Frank Miller
Niagara Falls	John Clement; 10,409	Vince Kerrio; 10,626	Peter Sobol; 7,003		John Clement
Nickel Belt	Gilles Pelland; 4,120	Pat Owens; 2,871	Floyd Laughren; 10,481		Floyd Laughren
Nipissing	John Valiquette; 7,262	Richard Smith; 15,390	Mike O'Hallarn; 5,054	Ed Diebel (Ind.); 660	Richard Smith
Northumberland	Russell Rowe; 13,397	Isobel Kirkpatrick; 10,315	John Taylor; 6,259		Russell Rowe
Oakville	James Snow; 12,365	McLean Anderson; 9,078	Doug Black; 5,969	Christina Morris (Ind.); 97	James Snow
Oakwood	Joseph Marrese; 4,619 (25.5%)	Richard Meagher; 5,939 (32.8%)	Tony Grande; 7,302 (40.3%)	Val Bjarnason (Comm.); 267 (1.5%)	New District
Oriole	John Reesor Williams; 12,327 (38.8%)	Bob Reid; 12,035 (37.9%)	Ken Crooke; 7,409 (23.3%)		New District
Oshawa	Alan Dewar; 6,848	Bill Menzies; 3,184	Michael Breaugh; 14,442	Lynn Rak (Comm.); 145	Charles McIlveen
Ottawa Centre	Gale Kerwin; 8,978 (32.78%)	Gerald Kirby; 7,500 (27.39%)	Michael Cassidy; 10,658 (38.92%)	Marvin Glass (Comm.); 250 (0.91%)	Michael Cassidy
Ottawa East	David Dehler; 5,001 (20.46%)	Albert Roy; 14,900 (60.96%)	Robert Cournoyer; 4,543 (18.59%)		Albert Roy
Ottawa South	Claude Bennett; 14,767 (43.15%)	Patricia Thorpe; 8,360 (24.43%)	Eileen Scotton; 11,099 (32.43%)		Claude Bennett
Ottawa West	Donald Morrow; 14,956	Walter Ryan; 9,949	Sue Findlay; 8,871		Donald Morrow
Oxford	Harry Craig Parrott; 17,776	Alice Garner; 12,595	Peter Klynstra; 4,675		Harry Craig Parrott
Parkdale	Robert Orr; 3,816 (22.23%)	Stanley Mamak; 5,599 (32.62%)	Jan Dukszta; 7,158 (41.71%)	Kerry McCuaig (Comm.) (1.74%); Robert McKay (Ind.); 203 (1.18%); Konrad Otta (Ind.); 89 (0.52%)	Jan Dukszta
Parry Sound	Lorne Maeck; 8,136	Ed Fisher; 7,178	Larry Labine; 2,973		Lorne Maeck
Perth	Bob Smith; 7,473	Hugh Edighoffer; 18,160	Larry J. Wraith; 2,989		Hugh Edighoffer
Peterborough	John Turner; 15,606	Mike O'Toole; 8,986	Gillian Sandeman; 16,169	G. Van Houten (Comm.); 80	John Melville Turner
Port Arthur	William Morgan; 7,595 (30.93%)	Joseph Vander Wees; 4,499 (18.32%)	Jim Foulds; 12,213 (49.74%)	Nancy McDonald (Comm.); 247 (1.01%)	Jim Foulds
Prescott and Russell	Joseph Albert Bélanger; 11,023	Roger L. Charron; 9,026	R. DesRochers; 5,027		Joseph Albert Bélanger
Prince Edward—Lennox	James A. Taylor; 9,810	Keith MacDonald; 9,055	Jan Nicol; 3,250		James A. Taylor
Quinte	Robin Jeffrey; 11,738	Hugh O'Neil; 12,448	C. McLaughlan; 4,744		Richard Potter
Rainy River	Allan Avis; 3,251	T. Patrick Reid; 5,839	M. Lichtenstein; 2,259		T. Patrick Reid
Renfrew North	Bob Cotnam; 6,779	Sean Conway; 6,939	Robert Cox; 5,938		Maurice Hamilton
Renfrew South	Paul Yakabuski; 14,082	Howard Haramis; 8,289	Lawrence Smith; 3,479	David Anderson (Ind.); 408	Paul Yakabuski
Riverdale	Dick Perdue; 4,865 (26.8%)	Nick Kapelos; 3,754 (20.7%)	Jim Renwick; 9,133 (50.3%)	Ed McDonald (Comm.); 389 (2.2%); Walter Belej (Ind.); 60 (0.3%); Armand Siksna (S.C.); 31 (0.2%)	Jim Renwick
Sarnia	Carl Fleck; 8,773 (31.10%)	Jim Bullbrook; 16,275 (57.69%)	Ivan Hillier; 2,957 (10.48%)	Marek Wiechula (Lbt.); 204 (0.72%)	Jim Bullbrook
Sault Ste. Marie	John Rhodes; 14,415 (42.46%)	Bob Gernon; 5,835 (17.19%)	Ron Moreau; 13,470 (39.67%)	Gordon Massie; 232 (0.68%)	John Rhodes
Scarborough Centre	Frank Drea; 10,329 (48.52%)	Ross Doswell; 5,067 (23.80%)	Dave Gracey; 5,595 (26.28%)	Gareth Blythe (Comm.); 200 (0.94%); R. M. Whidden (Ind.); 96 (0.4%)	Frank Drea
Scarborough East	Margaret Birch; 18,734 (54.0%)	John Coates; 8,169 (23.5%)	Ann Marie Hill; 7,271 (20.9%)	David Toothill; 539 (1.6%)	Margaret Birch
Scarborough North	Thomas Wells; 16,427 (43.3%)	Gerry Phillips; 13,821 (36.4%)	Guy Beaulieu; 7,268 (19.1%)	Robert Schultz (Ind.); 438 (1.2%)	Thomas Leonard Wells
Scarborough West	Syd Brown; 7,738 (27.6%)	Norm Kert; 4,422 (15.8%)	Stephen Lewis; 15,717 (56.1%)	Richard Sanders (Ind.); 133 (0.5%)	Stephen Lewis
Scarborough—Ellesmere	Brian Harrison; 8,242 (34.1%)	Ken Tilley; 6,147 (25.5%)	David Warner; 9,452 (39.2%)	Scott Bell (Ind.); 299 (1.2%)	New District
Simcoe Centre	David Arthur Evans; 13,555	Margaret Kelly; 9,116	Paul Wessenger; 11,623		David Arthur Evans
Simcoe East	Gordon Elsworth Smith; 11,443	Elinor Bingham; 7,246	Roger Pretty; 10,396		Gordon Elsworth Smith
St. Andrew—St. Patrick	Larry Grossman; 8,074 (36.6%)	Fred Kan; 6,012 (27.3%)	B. Beardsley; 7,627 (34.6%)	F. Cunningham (Comm.); 333 (1.5%)	Allan Grossman
St. Catharines	Robert Mercer Johnston; 10,064 (34.74%)	J.A. Rochefort; 9,270 (32.00%)	Fred Dickson; 9,215 (31.81%)	Bruce Magnuson (Comm.); 227 (0.78; Lucylle Boikoff; 192 (0.66%)	Robert Mercer Johnston
St. David	Margaret Scrivener; 10,593 (40.5%)	June Rowlands; 7,153 (27.3%)	Jim Lemon; 7,990 (30.5%)	Vincent Miller (Ind.); 232 (0.9%); Anna Larsen (Comm.); 205 (0.8%)	Margaret Scrivener
St. George	Frank Vasilkioti; 8,505 (33.3%)	Margaret Campbell; 10,677 (41.8%)	Lukin Robinson; 5,858 (22.9%)	Elizabeth Hill (Comm.); 272 (1.1%); Marshall Evoy; 248 (1.0%)	Margaret Campbell
Stormont—Dundas—Glengarry	Osie Villeneuve; 10,830	Peter Manley; 6,988	Gerard Lussier; 2,801		New District
Sudbury	Joe Fabbro; 9,764	Elmer Sopha; 10,236	Bud Germa; 11,511		Bud Germa
Sudbury East	Ray Plourde; 4,019	Ron Horeck; 9,594	Elie Martel; 18,650		Elie Martel
Timiskaming	Ed Havrot; 6,997	Howie Parker; 3,518	Robert Bain	C. Larochelle (SC); 169; Ron Romanow (Ind.)165	Ed Havrot
Victoria—Haliburton	Ronald Glen Hodgson; 9,960	John Eakins; 11,005	F. McLaughlin; 3,718	Harry Hughes (SC); 556	Ronald Glen Hodgson
Waterloo North	Bob Gramlow; 7,275	Edward R. Good; 12,431	Jack Kersell; 6,880		Edward R. Good
Welland	Allan Pietz; 9,000	Loyola Lemelin; 8,262	Mel Swart; 10,209	J. Severinsky (Comm.); 231	Ellis Morningstar
Wellington South	Clara Marett; 6,209	Harry Worton; 13,810	Carl Hamilton; 6,833		Harry Worton
Wellington—Dufferin—Peel	Jack Johnson; 11,968	Ted Sibbald; 11,159	Gerry Campbell; 6,169		New District
Wentworth	Matt Blair; 5,271	John W. Harvey; 5,162	Ian Deans; 14,791		Ian Deans
Wentworth North	Donald Ewen; 11,346	Eric Cunningham; 13,327	C. Faulknor; 8,180		Donald Ewen
Wilson Heights	David Rotenberg; 9,262	Vernon Singer; 11,480	Howard Moscoe; 7,476	George Dance; 372	New District
Windsor—Riverside	Bill Woolson; 3,671 (13.24%)	Mike MacDougall; 10,793 (38.91%)	Fred Burr; 13,273 (47.85%)		New District
Windsor—Sandwich	T. Vandereerden; 2,734	Lyle Browning; 7,548	Ted Bounsall; 10,543	J. Crouchman; 260; M. Longmoore (Comm.); 190	New District
Windsor—Walkerville	Ron Moro; 4,041	Bernard Newman; 12,659	David Burr; 6,923	N. Veronico (Comm.); 155	Bernard Newman
York Centre	Tony Roman; 12,968 (36.81)	Alfred Stong; 14,347 (40.72%)	Tony Snedker; 7,748 (21.99%)	John White (Ind.); 171 (0.49%)	Donald Deacon
York East	Arthur Meen; 14,544	Fred Darke; 9,019	Ed Chmielewski; 5,918	C. Greenland (Ind.); 696; Nick Pieros; 437	Arthur Meen
York Mills	Bette Stephenson; 17,921 (45.7%)	Bruce Bone; 14,077 (35.9%)	Allan Millard; 7,252 (18.5%)		Dalton Bales
York North	William Hodgson; 12,914	Margaret Britnell; 10,387	Robert Lewis; 9,263		William Hodgson
York South	James Trimbee; 7,083 (25.71%)	Alan Tonks; 6,494 (23.57%)	Donald C. MacDonald; 13,365 (48.50%)	Mike Phillips (Comm); 612 (2.22%)	Donald MacDonald
York West	Nick Leluk; 13,871 (38.70%)	Joseph Cruden; 12,515 (34.92%)	Ian Barrett; 9,454 (26.38%)		Nick Leluk
Yorkview	Dorlene Hewitt; 3,498 (13.67%)	Ben Bellantone; 8,086 (31.61%)	Fred Young; 13,406 (52.40%)	John Sweet (Comm); 594 (2.32%)	Fred Young
