= Progressive Conservative Party of Ontario candidates in the 1975 Ontario provincial election =

The Progressive Conservative Party of Ontario fielded a full slate of 125 candidates in the 1975 Ontario general election. The party, which had been in power since 1943, won a plurality victory with fifty-one seats and led a minority government for the next two years.

== Candidates ==
Riding	Candidate's Name	Occupation	Votes	%	Rank	Notes
Algoma	Bernt Gilbertson		4,525	35.45	2nd	Incumbent
Algoma—Manitoulin	John Lane		5,452	40.79	1st	Incumbent
Armourdale	Melvin Lastman		11,824	35.74	2nd	Mayor of North York (1973–97) and future mayor of Toronto (1997–2003)
Beaches—Woodbine	Thomas Wardle		8,576	34.10	2nd	Incumbent
Bellwoods	Elio Madonia		3,234	25.15	3rd	Co-creator of the Brio soft drink.
Brampton	Bill Davis		16,432	43.66	1st	Incumbent for Peel North; party leader and Premier of Ontario
Brantford	Richard Beckett		9,063	29.47	3rd	Incumbent
Brant—Oxford—Norfolk	Donald Harder		6,424	24.84	2nd	
Brock	Bob Welch		10,978	48.31	1st	Incumbent for Lincoln; Minister of Culture and Recreation
Burlington South	George Kerr		17,093	45.83	1st	Incumbent for Halton West
Cambridge	Ruggles Constant		8,595	29.12	3rd	
Carleton	Sidney Handleman		12,653	38.87	1st	Incumbent; Minister of Consumer and Commercial Relations
Carleton East	Darwin Kealey		9,579	28.80	3rd	
Carleton—Grenville	Donald Irvine		12,759	53.80	1st	Incumbent for Grenville-Dundas; Minister of Housing
Chatham—Kent	Darcy McKeough		10,146	43.73	1st	Incumbent; Minister of Energy
Cochrane North	René Brunelle		9,987	61.74	1st	Incumbent; Minister of Community and Social Services
Cochrane South	Alan Pope		9,781	42.29	2nd	Future legislator (1977–90) and minister (1979–85)
Cornwall	Rudy Villeneuve		9,276	39.60	2nd	
Don Mills	Dennis Timbrell		14,007	46.59	1st	Incumbent; Minister without portfolio responsible for Youth
Dovercourt	George Nixon		4,618	31.96	2nd	Incumbent
Downsview	Barbara Greene		5,814	26.51	3rd	Member of the North York Board of Control (1972–80, 1982–85)
Dufferin–Simcoe	George McCague		14,201	45.88	1st	Future cabinet minister (1977–85)
Durham East	Charles McIlveen		10,664	34.95	2nd	Incumbent for Oshawa
Durham North	William Newman		11,206	39.28	1st	Incumbent for Ontario South; Minister of Environment
Durham West	Bill Pilkington		7,579	26.02	3rd	
Eglinton	Roy McMurtry		16,679	50.97	1st	Future cabinet minister (1975–85)
Elgin	Ron McNeil		11,880	43.98	1st	Incumbent
Erie	John Buscarino		4,646	22.01	3rd	
Essex North	Frederick Cada		4,451	20.53	3rd	
Essex South	Frank Klees		7,395	32.12	2nd	Future legislator (1995–2014) and minister (1999–2001 and 2002–03)
Etobicoke	William Stockwell		7,191	30.00	3rd	Father of Chris Stockwell
Fort William	James Jessiman		8,220	32.79	2nd	Incumbent
Frontenac—Addington	Wilmer Nuttall		8,957	38.54	2nd	Incumbent
Grey	Eric Winkler		11,409	43.95	2nd	Incumbent; Chair of the Management Board of Cabinet
Grey-Bruce	Gary Harron		8,229	32.11	2nd	
Haldimand—Norfolk	James Allan		12,021	39.02	2nd	Incumbent
Halton—Burlington	Gary Dawkins		10,535	37.49	2nd	
Hamilton Centre	Maurice Carter		5,256	24.90	3rd	
Hamilton East	Bob Hodgson		6,407	21.28	3rd	
Hamilton Mountain	John Smith		12,769	38.80	1st	Incumbent
Hamilton West	Bob Morrow		10,041	36.38	2nd	Future mayor of Hamilton (1982–2000)
Hastings—Peterborough	Clarke Rollins		10,912	47.89	1st	Incumbent for Hastings
High Park—Swansea	Yuri Shymko		8,328	32.62	2nd	Future provincial legislator (1981–87)
Humber	John MacBeth		17,739	44.51	1st	
Huron—Bruce	William Walden		5,883	23.75	2nd	
Huron—Middlesex	Jim Hayter		8,098	36.79	2nd	
Kenora	Leo Bernier		9,584	52.57	1st	Incumbent; Minister of Natural Resources
Kent—Elgin	Donald Luckham		7,561	33.43	2nd	
Kingston and the Islands	Keith Norton		9,442	37.82	1st	
Kitchener	William Pernfuss		8,326	28.63	2nd	
Kitchener—Wilmot	Colin O'Brian		6,275	25.73	3rd	
Lake Nipigon	Ernest Caccamo		1,766	14.74	3rd	
Lakeshore	Helen Wursta		6,281	22.45	3rd	
Lambton	Lorne Henderson		11,042	51.53	1st	Incumbent
Lanark	Douglas Wiseman		11,641	56.58	1st	Incumbent
Leeds	James Auld		13,913	58.21	1st	Incumbent; Minister of Colleges and Universities
Lincoln	Paul Prince		7,901	37.63	2nd	
London Centre	Earle Terry		9,003	31.41	2nd	
London North	Gordon Walker		11,407	37.21	2nd	Incumbent
London South	John Eberhard		13,937	39.37	2nd	
Middlesex	Robert Eaton		10,092	44.97	1st	Incumbent for Middlesex South
Mississauga East	Bud Gregory		9,973	39.05	1st	
Mississauga North	Terry Jones		11,001	35.55	1st	
Mississauga South	Doug Kennedy		11,870	43.04	1st	Incumbent for Peel South
Muskoka	Frank Miller		7,061	43.97	1st	Incumbent; Minister of Health
Niagara Falls	John Clement		10,422	37.18	2nd	Incumbent; Solicitor General
Nickel Belt	Gilles Pelland		4,034	23.66	2nd	
Nipissing	John Valiquette		7,239	25.41	2nd	
Northumberland	Russell Rowe		13,328	44.58	1st	Incumbent; Speaker of the Legislative Assembly of Ontario
Oakville	James Snow		12,933	45.84	1st	Incumbent for Halton East; Minister of Government Services
Oakwood	Joseph Marrese		4,637	24.63	3rd	Chair of the Metropolitan Separate School Board
Oriole	John Williams		12,297	38.71	1st	
Oshawa	Alan Dewar		6,851	27.58	2nd	
Ottawa Centre	Gale Kerwin		8,978	31.62	2nd	
Ottawa East	David Dehler		5,001	20.46	2nd	
Ottawa South	Claude Bennett		14,767	43.15	1st	Incumbent; Ministry of Industry and Tourism
Ottawa West	Donald Morrow		14,889	44.34	1st	Incumbent
Oxford	Harry Parrott		17,776	50.72	1st	Incumbent
Parkdale	Robert Orr		3,816	22.23	3rd	
Parry Sound	Lorne Maeck		8,154	44.56	1st	Incumbent
Perth	Robert Smith		7,387	26.20	2nd	
Peterborough	John Turner		15,649	38.29	2nd	Incumbent
Port Arthur	William Morgan		7,595	30.93	2nd	
Prescott and Russell	Joseph Belanger		11,006	43.93	1st	Incumbent
Prince Edward—Lennox	James Taylor		9,628	44.32	1st	Incumbent
Quinte	Robin Jeffrey		11,781	40.79	2nd	
Rainy River	Allan Avis		3,235	28.32	2nd	
Renfrew North	Robert Cotnam		6,875	34.49	2nd	
Renfrew South	Paul Yakabuski		13,886	54.20	1st	Incumbent
Riverdale	Richard Perdue		4,865	26.78	2nd	
St. Andrew—St. Patrick	Larry Grossman		8,054	36.66	1st	Future cabinet minister (1977–85)
St. Catharines	Robert Johnston		10,064	34.74	1st	Incumbent
St. David	Margaret Scrivener		10,536	40.27	1st	Incumbent
St. George	Frank Vasilkioti		8,577	32.70	2nd	
Sarnia	Carl Fleck		8,773	31.10	2nd	
Sault Ste. Marie	John Rhodes		14,415	42.46	1st	Incumbent; Minister of Transportation and Communications
Scarborough Centre	James Drea		10,399	41.15	1st	Incumbent; future cabinet minister (1977–85)
Scarborough East	Margaret Birch		12,645	42.59	1st	Incumbent; Provincial Secretary for Social Development
Scarborough—Ellesmere	Brian Harrison		9,226	34.03	2nd	
Scarborough North	Thomas Wells		16,512	43.41	1st	Incumbent; Minister of Education
Scarborough West	Sydney Brown		7,212	26.17	2nd	
Simcoe Centre	Art Evans		13,557	39.52	1st	Incumbent
Simcoe East	Gordon Smith		11,622	39.48	1st	Incumbent
Stormont—Dundas—Glengarry	Osie Villeneuve		10,833	52.54	1st	Incumbent for Glengarry
Sudbury	Joseph Fabbro		9,549	29.88	2nd	Mayor of Sudbury (1957–1959, 1964—65, 1968–75)
Sudbury East	Ray Plourde		3,837	12.03	3rd	
Timiskaming	Edward Havrot		7,169	36.26	2nd	Incumbent
Victoria—Haliburton	Ronald Hodgson		9,884	39.45	2nd	Incumbent
Waterloo North	Robert Gramlow		7,144	27.34	2nd	
Welland	Allan Pietz		8,879	32.77	2nd	Mayor of Welland (1965–76)
Wellington-Dufferin-Peel	Jack Johnson		12,110	40.61	1st	
Wellington South	Clara Marett		7,063	22.87	3rd	
Wentworth	Matthew Blair		5,270	20.85	2nd	
Wentworth North	Donald Ewen		11,265	34.51	2nd	Incumbent
Wilson Heights	David Rotenberg		8,739	32.46	2nd	Future provincial legislator (1977–85) and minister (1985)
Windsor—Riverside	William Woolson		3,671	13.23	3rd	
Windsor—Sandwich	Anthony Vandereerden		2,732	12.79	3rd	
Windsor—Walkerville	Ronald Moro		3,979	16.94	3rd	
York Centre	Anthony Roman		13,083	35.93	2nd	Mayor of Markham (1970–84)
York East	Arthur Meen		14,487	47.42	1st	Incumbent; Minister of Revenue
York Mills	Bette Stephenson		17,365	46.46	1st	Future cabinet minister (1975–85)
York North	William Hodgson		12,891	39.65	1st	Incumbent
York South	James Trimbee		7,064	25.78	2nd	
York West	Nicholas Leluk		13,871	38.70	1st	Incumbent for Humber
Yorkview	Dorlene Hewitt		3,498	13.67	3rd	

Source for election results: Election Results, Elections Ontario, accessed 2 November 2021.
