= Ontario Liberal Party candidates in the 1985 Ontario provincial election =

The Ontario Liberal Party won 48 of 125 seats in the 1985 Ontario provincial election, emerging as the second-largest party in the legislature. They later formed a minority government with outside support from the Ontario New Democratic Party.

Many of the party's candidates have their own biography pages. Information on others may be found here.

== Joseph (Joe) Ricciuti (Oakwood) ==
Ricciuti holds a Bachelor of Commerce degree from McMaster University. He worked with the firm of Canada Life for many years, eventually reaching the position of vice-president of Group Business Development and Marketing. He joined Watson Wyatt Canada in 2003 as National Practice Director of Group and Healthcare, and has campaigned for a more progressive approach to managing mental health concerns in the workplace.

Ricciuti campaigned for a Toronto School Trustee's position in 1974, finishing six in the city's fourth ward. He later served as campaign manager for federal Liberal candidate Jim Coutts in a 1981 by-election.

Ricciuti was thirty-four years old in 1985. In 1987, he supported Chaviva Hošek's successful bid for the Oakwood Liberal nomination.

Electoral record
Election	Division	Party	Votes	%	Place	Winner
1974 Toronto municipal	School Trustee, Ward Four	n/a	686		6/7	Bernard Midanik and David Shanott
1985 provincial	Oakwood	Liberal	9,631	38.52	2/4	Tony Grande, New Democratic Party

== Horace Hale (York South) ==
Hale was born in Jamaica, and moved to Canada in 1971. In 1985, he was a 35-year-old sales consultant for a medical supplier. His campaign focused on economic issues. He received 6,807 votes (22.46%) to finish second against New Democratic Party leader Bob Rae. Hale ran for the High Park—Swansea Liberal nomination for the 1987 provincial election, but lost to David Fleet, 292 votes to 176.
