= Ontario Liberal Party candidates in the 1977 Ontario provincial election =

The Ontario Liberal Party, ran a full slate of candidates in the 1977 provincial election, and elected thirty-four candidates to emerge as the Official Opposition in the provincial legislature. Many of the party's candidates have their own biography pages; information about others may be found here.

== Candidates ==
=== Brantford: Arne Zabell ===
Arne J. Zabell (March 9, 1929 – July 17, 2009) was a businessman in Brantford. He moved to Canada from Denmark in the 1960s, operated the Brantford Rental Centre until 1979, and later founded Zabell Hearing Centres. He was also an active freemason, joining in 1967. His son, also named Arne Zabell, has run for office in British Columbia.

Zabell sought election to Brantford City Council and the Legislative Assembly of Ontario in the 1970s.

Electoral record
Election	Division	Party	Votes	%	Place	Winner
1972 Brantford municipal	Council, Ward Five	n/a	489	6.30	5/6	James Kent and Charles Ward
1977 provincial	Brantford	Liberal	6,130	21.44	3/3	Mac Makarchuk, New Democratic Party

=== Durham West: Joe E. Bugelli ===
Bugelli was born in Zabbar, Malta on July 20, 1947, and moved to Canada with his family in 1963. He was educated at Durham College, George Brown College and the University of Waterloo. He finished third against Progressive Conservative candidate George Ashe in the 1977 election. Bugelli was elected to the Whitby Town Council in 1978, and was re-elected in 1980, 1982, 1985 and 1988. He also served for five years on the Board of Directors of the Association of Municipalities of Ontario.

During the early 1980s, Bugelli attempted to prevent body-rub parlours from opening in the city. He later worked to restrict strip clubs from the community in 1987, and tried to quash a bar-laundromat combination from opening in the city two years later. Bugelli also attempted to shut down home-operated businesses in 1984, describing them as disruptive to the community.

Bugelli served as chair of the Central Lake Ontario Conservation Authority for eleven years. He brought forward a plan in 1989 to subdivide the authority's surplus land, and sell individual lots for profit. He argued that the land in question was "high and dry and of no environmental concern", and accused the city of Oshawa of trying to stall the plan for selfish purposes.

In 1990, Bugelli brought forward a successful motion to abolish parking fees in municipal lots. This followed passage of a provincial law which required Whitby to pay more in taxes for charging fees than it anticipated to receive collecting them.

Bugelli left town council in 1991 to campaign for a seat on the Durham Regional Separate School Board. He was elected as a Whitby representative, and chaired the board's finance committee. He avoided imposing major layoffs in 1994, at a time when 132 positions were cut in the public system. In 1992, he opposed a motion to remove the oath of allegiance to the Queen from the swearing-in ceremony. He did not seek re-election in 1994

Bugelli was the president and chief executive officer of Computer Composition of Canada Inc. during the 1980s, and remained a prominent with the company after it was bought by MDC Corporation of Toronto in 1989. He was subsequently appointed president and chief executive officer of Pro-Image Corporation in York, Pennsylvania.

Electoral record
Election	Division	Party	Votes	%	Place	Winner
1977 provincial	Durham West	Liberal	5,075		3/4	George Ashe, Progressive Conservative
1978 municipal	Whitby council, Ward Two	n/a	not listed		not listed	himself
1980 municipal	Whitby council, Ward Two	n/a	not listed		not listed	himself
1982 municipal	Whitby council, Ward Two	n/a	accl.		1/1	himself
1985 municipal	Whitby council, Ward Two	n/a	accl.		1/1	himself
1988 municipal	Whitby council, Ward Two	n/a	2,708		1/2	himself
1991 municipal	Durham Separate School Board; Whitby Representative, English Language	n/a	not listed		not listed	himself

=== Oakwood: Richard (Rick) Meagher ===
Meagher is a Toronto lawyer. He holds a Bachelor of Arts degree from St. Francis Xavier University (1966) and a Bachelor of Laws degree from Dalhousie University, and was called to the Ontario Bar in 1971.

He first campaigned for the Ontario legislature in 1975 at age thirty-one, after winning the Oakwood Liberal nomination over Norman Kert and Marvin Gordon. He argued for an increase in workers compensation rates, and opposed extension of the Spadina Expressway.

He represented Conrad Black during a property dispute in 1978. In 2005, he became a partner with the firm Lang Michener LLP.

Electoral record
Election	Division	Party	Votes	%	Place	Winner
1975 provincial	Oakwood	Liberal	5,970	31.71	2/5	Tony Grande, New Democratic Party
1977 provincial	Oakwood	Liberal	5,046	23.81	3/6	Tony Grande, New Democratic Party
