= Communist Party of Canada (Ontario) candidates in the 1987 Ontario provincial election =

The Communist Party of Canada - Ontario ran a nine of candidates in the 1987 provincial election, all were defeated.

Riding	Candidate's Name	Notes	Residence	Occupation	Votes	%	Rank
Brampton South	Jim Bridgewood				268		5
Fort William	John Maclennan				300		4
Hamilton East	Bob Jaggard				673		4
Oakwood	Geoffrey da Silva				556		4
Parkdale	Gordon Massie				184		6
Riverdale	Maggie Bizzell				210		6
St. Catharines	Eric Blair				369		4
Windsor—Walkerville	Mike Longmoore				335		4
York East	Chris Frazer				527		4
