= Communist Party of Canada (Ontario) candidates in the 1977 Ontario provincial election =

The Communist Party of Canada - Ontario fielded a number of candidates in the 1977 Ontario provincial election, none of whom were elected. Information about these candidates may be found on this page.

== Val Bjarnason (Oakwood) ==
Bjarnason was a soldier during World War II, commanding a Canadian tank regiment through dangerous conditions in Europe. He subsequently became a prominent figure in the Canadian labour movement, serving as provincial organizer for the United Textile Workers in Ontario in the late 1940s. A Toronto Star report from 1947 indicates that he was involved with the social-democratic Cooperative Commonwealth Federation during this period. He was blacklisted from the 1950 convention of the American Federation of Labour Trades and Labour Congress of Canada on suspicion of being a communist.

Bjarnason was national coordinator for the United Electrical Workers during the 1960s and 1970s. He became secretary-treasurer of the union in the 1970s, and served in the position until his retirement in 1984. He received media attention in 1979 for challenging Canadian General Electric Co. Ltd. over that company's attempt to gain access to the social insurance numbers of employees. He was also involved with international issues, and called for union boycotts of Chilean goods during Augusto Pinochet's rule.

Bjarnason moved to Kitchener following his retirement, and was an active member of the group Veterans Against Nuclear Arms. He criticized the Gulf War in 1990. In 1996, he took part in a protest against the policies of the Mike Harris government as a member of the Ontario Provincial Federation of Union Retirees.

He campaigned for the Communist Party of Canada - Ontario on two occasions.

Electoral record
Election	Division	Party	Votes	%	Place	Winner
1975 provincial	Oakwood	Communist	271	1.44	5/5	Tony Grande, New Democratic Party
1977 provincial	Oakwood	Communist	229	1.08	4/6	Tony Grande, New Democratic Party
