= Kamala Jean Gopie =

Canadian political activist

Kamala Jean Gopie OOnt is a Jamaican-born Canadian political activist.

== Early life ==
Gopie, whose ancestors went to Jamaica from India as indentured labourers, was born in Jamaica and moved to Canada in 1963 after graduating from high school. She holds Bachelor of Arts (1975) and Master of Education (1990) degrees from the University of Toronto, and worked as a teacher with the North York School Board in private life. She is best known for her community activism within Toronto, Ontario.

== Career ==
She served as president of the Jamaican Canadian Association from 1979 to 1980, and was a member of the Ontario Advisory Council on Multiculturalism and Citizenship from 1980 to 1984. She later served as chair of the Urban Alliance on Race Relations, and was a founding director of the Black Business and Professional Association in 1982.

She campaigned for the Legislative Assembly of Ontario in 1981 and received 4,171 votes (21.26%) in Oakwood for a third-place finish against New Democratic Party incumbent Tony Grande. She campaigned for the Liberal Party of Canada nomination in York—Scarborough in 1984, but was unsuccessful.

In early 1986, she was appointed to the Ontario Housing Corporation and became chairman of the Harry Jerome Scholarship Fund for black Canadian athletes. Later in the same year, she helped to organize a Toronto dinner for South African anti-apartheid leader Desmond Tutu.

Gopie served on the Ontario Race Relations and Policing Task Force in 1989. The task force drew attention to reports of systematic racial discrimination in Ontario's police services, and encouraged the Ontario government to establish mandatory hiring quotas for racial minorities (at the time, 94% of Ontario police were white males). Gopie later announced her support for both William McCormack's appointment as chief of the Toronto Police force in 1989, and Susan Eng's appointment as chair of the Toronto Police board in 1991.

It was subsequently reported that Gopie (along with several other black community leaders) was the target of a secret Metropolitan Toronto Police probe during her time as a member of the provincial task force. The probe listed Gopie as a radical activist, a charge that she dismissed as "ludicrous". The police action in this matter was widely criticized in the mainstream media.

Gopie has received several awards for her community activism, most notably the Order of Ontario in 1996. She served as a Governor of the University of Toronto in the 1990s, and was appointed to the federal Immigration and Refugee Board in 1998.

The University of Toronto currently offers a Kamala-Jean Gopie Award, to be given to undergraduate students that have "demonstrated an interest in issues concerning women of Indian descent from or in the Caribbean".
