= Willis Cummins (candidate) =

Willis Cummins was 39 years old at the time he stood in Oakwood for the 1977 Ontario provincial election, and was a part-time teacher with the North York Board of Education. He also described himself as a former journalist for Contrast. In 1973, he wrote an article for The Globe and Mail newspaper on emergence of a black film industry in North America. He received 170 votes (0.80%), finishing fifth against New Democratic Party incumbent Tony Grande.
