= Red Book (Liberal Party of Canada) =

1993 election platform

The Red Book's layout was distinctive and carefully crafted in comparison with other party platforms in 1993. It made extensive use of two typefaces: Sabon and Monotype Grotesque, which were popular in editorial design at the moment.

The Red Book, officially titled Creating Opportunity: The Liberal Plan for Canada, was the platform of the Liberal Party of Canada in the 1993 federal election. It earned its name from its bright red cover, red being the official colour of the Liberal Party. It was a 112-page booklet; many thousands of copies of it were printed, and it was widely distributed.

== Purpose ==
It was exceptional in how specific it was; while platforms before and since have contained few substantive promises and many vague statements of principle, the Red Book laid out a long list of changes that the Liberals would make if brought to power.

It was also rare in Canada to have an entire platform released at once. Generally, a party would release a policy idea, wait for it to gather as much media attention as possible, and then release another. Those ideas had also been released during speeches by the party leader, not printed in unbending prose.

Perhaps most central was that the Liberal Red Book gave costs for each of their promises and summed them. Never before had a party attempted to clearly prove that its promises were fiscally responsible and practical. Paul Martin, the man who led the team that produced the Red Book was less complimentary about the book in private, as during his time in office as Finance Minister, he was often reported to have said: "Don't tell me about the Red Book, I wrote the damn thing, and I know that it is a lot of crap!"

It was one of the first "contract with the public" type platforms, an idea used by the United States Republican Party in its 1994 Contract with America and Mike Harris' 1995 Common Sense Revolution in Ontario.

== 1993 election ==
The Liberals, out of power since 1984, were widely expected to win the 1993 election based on the great pan-Canadian dislike for the Progressive Conservative government of Brian Mulroney. The Liberals under Jean Chrétien were worried by a jump in Tory support with the selection of new leader Kim Campbell.

A larger concern was the general Canadian antipathy towards politicians after the tumultuous and scandal plagued Mulroney years. The 1992 referendum on the Charlottetown Accord was widely interpreted of a rejection of Canada's political elite by the general population.

To attempt to break through the cynicism and distrust the Liberals felt that being more specific and making many promises would help ensure a victory, thus the Red Book was created.

The Red Book was drafted mainly by Paul Martin, who finished as runner-up in the 1990 Liberal leadership convention to Chrétien, and Chaviva Hošek a top policy official with the Liberals. By giving Martin a prominent role in the campaign, this was seen as Chrétien's attempt to unify the Liberal Party.

=== Impact ===
The Liberals rolled out the Red Book on September 19, not long after the September 8 election call. Several days later, the Progressive Conservatives released the hastily assembled A Taxpayer's Agenda, but the Liberals had captured the reputation of being the party with ideas since they had essentially released their entire platform. Thanks to the Red Book as well as a gradual decline in support for the governing Conservatives (unpopularity, vote splitting with Reform and Bloc), the Liberals won a strong majority government with 177 seats—the third-best result in the party's history, and their best performance since their record 190 seats in the 1949 election. The Conservatives were nearly eliminated from the political scene, falling to two seats in the worst defeat ever suffered for a governing party at the federal level.

== Broken promises ==
The specificity of the Red Book came back to haunt the Liberals, however, and much of the next few years were spent defending broken promises. The most notable of these was the Goods and Services Tax, which the Liberals had promised to replace but only did so in the Atlantic provinces.

In Chrétien's view, the majority of the promises were kept. He famously argued that 78% were honoured, a mark he could live with. Others contest whether some of these promises were kept or not. Some of the most notable promises from the Red Book that were kept were the pledge to cancel the purchase of new naval helicopters, canceling the sale of Toronto Pearson International Airport, reforming unemployment insurance, legislating more gun control, and reducing the size of the armed forces with the end of the Cold War. Perhaps the most important pledge kept was that of returning Canada to fiscal solvency.

New Liberal Red Books were published for the 1997 and 2000 elections. These contained far fewer specifics and more generalities.

== See also ==
- Election promise
