= Tony Rizzo =

Canadian politician

Ontario MPP
- In office 1990–1995
- Preceded by: Chaviva Hošek
- Succeeded by: Mike Colle
- Constituency: Oakwood

Alderman, Ward 3, Borough/City of York
- In office 1982–1990
- Preceded by: Ron Bradd
- Succeeded by: Paul Owen (interim), Rob Davis

Personal details
- Born: June 27, 1940 (age 86) Italy
- Party: New Democrat (1980-2000); Liberal (2000-)
- Children: 3
- Occupation: Businessman

Tony Rizzo (born June 27, 1940) is a former politician in Ontario, Canada. He was a New Democratic member of the Legislative Assembly of Ontario from 1990 to 1995 who represented the central Toronto riding of Oakwood. He was also an alderman for the city of York from 1982 to 1990.

== Background ==
Rizzo was born in Italy and moved to Canada in 1965 by himself. He studied engineering and obtained work as a civil engineer in the engineering dept of Metropolitan Toronto and then with Ontario Housing Corporation and then with Ontario Dept. of Public Works. In 1971, he created Pro Masonry Ltd and in !973 Primus Masonry Ltd. . in 1989. He is married with three children. Rizzo's daughter Gidget was elected as a school trustee in 1994. His son Luigi unsuccessfully challenged veteran municipal councillor Howard Moscoe in the 2003 municipal election.

== Politics ==
=== Municipal ===
In 1980, Rizzo ran for a seat on the municipal council in the borough of York. Running as a candidate supported by New Democrats, he lost to incumbent Ron Bradd. In 1982, he contested the same ward, this time without party affiliation, and won beating Bradd. He beat Bradd again in 1985 and again in 1988.

In 1989, Rizzo was accused of underhanded electioneering in the 1988 election when he admitted to donating $700 to the campaign of Roland Saggiorato, a rival candidate shortly after Saggiorato withdrew from the race. Rizzo claimed the donation was legal but some argued the payment was a bribe for Saggiorato withdrawing his candidacy. Saggiorato had left the race after finding out that Ron Brad, who had encouraged him to run, had registered again as a candidate. Later, Rizzo tried unsuccessfully to appoint Saggiorato to the city's municipal Committee of Adjustment - a position that came with a $2,000 honorarium. Saggiorato said that although he accepted the $700 as part of his election campaign, he had expected an appointment to the committee. He said, "...the whole thing is, the committee job on the committee of adjustment, that was supposed to come."

In late 1989 to mid 1990, Rizzo became embroiled in the infamous Fairbank Park development scandal. Rizzo was head of the committee that was considering the sale of land north of Fairbank Park. In August 1990, Rizzo, when the final proposal contemplating the sale of part of the Fairbank Park went to council, Rizzo resigned as Chairman and voted against the proposal followed by councillor Nunziata, Frances Nunziata to oppose the project. In the end aldermen Jim Fera and Tony Mandarano were convicted for receiving bribes from the developer. Rizzo was questioned by the police but not charged.

In 1997, he sought a return to municipal politics. He ran in the newly formed Ward 28 (York Eglinton) but lost to Joe Mihevc and Rob Davis. (Note: Two candidates were elected to each riding in the 1997 election.) In 2000, he ran against Howard Moscoe in Ward 15. He accused Moscoe of interfering in a recent Toronto Transit Commission strike and of collusion with the taxicab industry. He lost the election by 3,627 votes.

=== Provincial ===
He was elected to the Ontario legislature in the provincial election of 1990, defeating Liberal incumbent Chaviva Hošek by 2,280 votes in the Toronto riding of Oakwood. The NDP won a majority government in this election under the leadership of Bob Rae. In his old riding, York council appointed Reverend Paul Owen to replace Rizzo as an interim alderman. Rob Davis won the seat in a municipal election a year later.

On October 5, 1990, it was revealed that Rizzo had obtained home renovation drawings from architect Rocco Maragna in 1987. Later on Rizzo had voted at council to approve city contracts for Maragna's architectural firm. Rizzo admitted that he hadn't declared a conflict of interest because he didn't pay for the drawings. He said, "When I asked for an invoice, he refused to give it to me. I should have insisted. To repay him, I took him for lunch. I should have insisted on an invoice. Maybe it would cost me less." Rizzo wrote in a press release that "In hindsight, I see that what then seemed a small thing was an error in judgment." Premier Bob Rae took issue with Rizzo's response, however he didn't expel him. "It doesn't make it any easier, but bad things happen," Rae said. "The test, it seems to me, is how you respond to those things. Human beings are human beings. They make mistakes."

On October 19, 1990, a further impropriety surfaced. In 1989, the Ontario Labour Relations Board found that Rizzo had shifted a dozen workers from one company to a new one ( Muro Construction Ltd ) following the residential construction industry crisis in order to save their job and keep them working in spite of higher wages as result of joining a different union paying them higher benefits and higher dues. To stop the harassment of Local Union Rizzo agreed to pay $8,164 to pay dues for a certain period of time for the workers for which dues were paid to Local 586 for the same period of time. Rae was angered not only by the revelation but also Rizzo's response to the allegation. When confronted by reporters Rizzo had used the f.... word and the next day he resigned from the NDP caucus to sit as an independent member of the legislature. He said, "There was a settlement. My men were paid twice for their benefits through two unions. There's nothing wrong with that. In business, you have to face these problems once in a while," He went on to say that he expected to be back in the NDP caucus. He said, "In time, you will see I have never done anything wrong." He also accused Liberal rival, Chaviva Hošek, of being behind the accusation. "She was behind it during the campaign. This is a continuation of the campaign... you will see somebody tried to get me. Not only that, but they tried to embarrass the government and they would do the same to any member of this government to try to embarrass the government."

In June 1992, Rizzo was allowed to return to the NDP caucus and, during the caucus meeting before the summer recess, Rizzo suggested to the Premier and to the Minister of Finance and the Minister Transportation to start the process for financing and construction of the Eglinton Subway that was eventually started in 1994 but later stopped by the Harris government. He said, "It's finally over. I feel vindicated." Rae said he wouldn't refuse Rizzo's request to return.

In May 1994, Rizzo introduced a private member's bill that would have ensured that the courts consider grandparents in the best interest of the children. In June, Rizzo was one of twelve NDP MPPs to vote against Bill 167, proposed legislation that would have extended spousal benefits to same-sex couples. Premier Rae allowed a free vote on the legislation. Rizzo said that he felt sorry about the outcome but said he followed his personal convictions on the vote. He said, "There's nothing for me to feel vindicated about. I would have preferred a bill I could support. I did what I felt was right, but I don't feel any satisfaction."

Rizzo's decision to vote against the legislation almost cost him a nomination vote in his riding in 1995. He narrowly won a vote to be the NDP candidate for Oakwood in the 1995 provincial election. Helen Rykens who called herself a same-sex rights activist challenged him in a nomination battle. Rizzo won by 171 to 139 votes. Joe Flexer a former NDP supporter put his name forward as an independent labour candidate in Oakwood. Flexer was supported by teachers' union leader Liz Barkley. Her support resulted in her later expulsion from the NDP.

Declining support for the NDP because of controversial legislation like the social contract and general dissatisfaction with the party led to Rizzo's defeat. He lost to Liberal Mike Colle by 975 votes.

=== Electoral record ===
1990 Ontario general election: Oakwood
Party	Candidate	Votes	%
New Democratic	Tony Rizzo	10,572	48.9
Liberal	Chaviva Hošek	8,196	37.9
Conservative	Claudio Lewis	1,712	7.9
Green	Steven Peck	589	2.7
Libertarian	John Primerano	359	1.7
Communist	Elizabeth Rowley	206	1.0
Total		21,634	
123 out of 134 polls reporting.
"How Metro-Area Voted". The Toronto Daily Star. Toronto. 1990-09-07. p. A10.

1995 Ontario general election: Oakwood
Party	Candidate	Votes	%
Liberal	Mike Colle	8,599	42.3
New Democratic	Tony Rizzo	7,624	37.5
Conservative	Courtney Doldron	3,298	16.2
Independent	Joseph Flexer	301	1.7
Green	Constantine Kritsonis	269	1.3
Natural Law	Doug Storey	136	0.7
Libertarian	Nunzio Venuto	100	0.5
Total		20,327	
"Summary of Valid Ballots by Candidate". Elections Ontario. 1995-06-08.

== After politics ==
Rizzo formed a company called GTA Municipal Consultants which files property tax appeals for homeowners and takes a 50 per cent cut of any savings.
