= Marvin Gordon (candidate) =

Canadian candidate (1930–2013)

Marvin Gordon (born in Toronto March 18, 1930, died January 26, 2013) was a frequent candidate for public office during the 1970s. A 1972 newspaper report lists him as a thirty-four-year-old teacher and lawyer. In the 1974 municipal election, he campaigned for school trustee on the slogans "Cut the high cost of education and reduce your taxes" and "Restore traditional values to the classroom". He later campaigned in favour of lower property taxes and an increased police presence.

He was president of York's Ward One Tenants Association in 1975, and opposed plans to have trucks routed through the area by authorities in Metropolitan Toronto.

Gordon was a member of the Liberal Party during the 1970s, and contested the party's nomination for Oakwood in 1975. After losing to Richard Meagher, he ran as an independent candidate. He later affiliated with the New Democratic Party, and campaigned with the endorsement of that party and the Ontario Secondary School Teachers Federation in the 1985 municipal election. He opposed the extension of separate school funding, and wanted an increased emphasis on basic learning.

He received 558 votes (2.96%) in the 1975 election, finishing fourth against New Democratic Party candidate Tony Grande.

Electoral record
| Election | Division | Party | Votes | % | Place | Winner |
|---|---|---|---|---|---|---|
| 1972 York municipal | Alderman, Ward One | n/a | 398 | | 3/3 | Ben Nobleman |
| 1974 York municipal | School Trustee, Ward Five | n/a | 1,018 | | 2/2 | William Bayes |
| York municipal by-election, 12 May 1975 | School Trustee, Ward Five | n/a | 271 | | 3/3 | Patricia Hainer |
| 1975 provincial | Oakwood | Independent | 558 | 2.96 | 4/5 | Tony Grande, New Democratic Party |
| 1976 York municipal | Board of Control | n/a | 6,229 | | 4/5 | Douglas Saunders and Alan Tonks |
| 1978 York municipal | Alderman, Ward Two | n/a | 351 | | 3/4 | Oscar Kogan |
| 1980 York municipal | Alderman, Ward Seven | n/a | 743 | | 2/4 | John Nunziata |
| 1982 York municipal | Alderman, Ward Seven | n/a | 501 | | 7/10 | Gary Bloor |
| 1985 North York municipal | School Trustee, Ward Six | n/a (New Democratic Party) | 1,065 | | 3/4 | Zale Newman |
