= Chaviva Hošek =

Canadian politician

The Honourable Chaviva Hošek OC ECO

Ontario MPP
- In office 1987–1990
- Preceded by: Tony Grande
- Succeeded by: Tony Rizzo
- Constituency: Oakwood

Personal details
- Born: October 6, 1946 (age 79) Chomutov, Czechoslovakia
- Party: Liberal
- Education: McGill University; Harvard University
- Occupation: Professor

Chaviva Milada Hošek, OC; (born 6 October 1946) is a Canadian academic, feminist and former politician.

== Background ==
Hošek was born in Chomutov, Czechoslovakia. Her mother was imprisoned in Auschwitz during World War II. The family initially moved to Israel but then emigrated to Montreal in 1952. She received her undergraduate degree from McGill University and earned a doctorate in English literature from Harvard in 1973.

She worked as a professor of English Literature at Victoria University in the University of Toronto for thirteen years, achieved tenured status and served on the University's governing council. In 1985 she was appointed co-chairman of Prime Minister Brian Mulroney's National Economic Conference. In 1986 she resigned from the university and went to work for Gordon Capital Corp. as a pension consultant. An active feminist, she served as president of the National Action Committee on the Status of Women from 1984 to 1986. She later described her time at the NAC as "the harshest political experience I ever had", claiming that the group was polarized by internal divisions during this period. Hošek was named B'nai Brith Woman of the Year in 1984 and received the YWCA Woman of Distinction Award in 1986 for Community and Public Service.

== Politics ==
In the 1987 Ontario election, Hošek won a seat in the Legislative Assembly of Ontario as the Liberal Member of Provincial Parliament for the Toronto riding of Oakwood, defeating Ontario New Democratic Party incumbent Tony Grande by 1,331 votes. She was appointed to David Peterson's cabinet as Minister of Housing and embarked on a program to expand social housing.

In the spring of 1989, Hošek was implicated in the Patti Starr affair. Starr, a close associate of Hošek, was a Liberal fundraiser who was head of the National Council of Jewish Women (Toronto Section) and had misused her position to contribute funds illegally to the 1987 election campaigns of several Liberal MPPs. Peterson shuffled his cabinet on August 1, 1989, and Hošek was not included. Hošek did not receive funds from Starr but several key members of the Housing Ministry were implicated in the scandal. Hošek had also made an unpopular decision not to reappoint former Toronto mayor John Sewell to the board of the Metro Toronto Housing Authority.

The Peterson government was defeated in the 1990 Ontario election, Hošek lost her riding to Tony Rizzo of the NDP by 2,280 votes.

=== Cabinet positions ===
Peterson ministry, Province of Ontario (1985–1990)
Cabinet post (1)
| Predecessor | Office | Successor |
|---|---|---|
| Alvin Curling | Minister of Housing; 1987–1989 | John Sweeney (Note: Sweeney named as Minister of Municipal Affairs and Housing.) |

== Later life ==
Hošek became director of the Liberal Party of Canada's caucus research bureau in 1990. Along with Paul Martin, she co-authored Creating Opportunity, as the party's campaign platform for the 1993 federal election was called. After Liberal leader Jean Chrétien became Prime Minister of Canada, Hošek was appointed Director of Policy and Research in the Prime Minister's Office, and wrote the Liberal platforms for the 1997 and 2000 federal elections

In 2001, Hošek left the PMO to become president and CEO of the Canadian Institute for Advanced Research. She retired from this position in May 2012.

On October 27, 2002, she received an honorary doctorate from the University of Ottawa.

On October 5, 2006, she was appointed an Officer of the Order of Canada.

On June 25, 2009, she received an honorary doctorate from York University (Ontario).

== Archives ==
There is a Chaviva Hosek fonds at Library and Archives Canada.
