= John Eakins =

Canadian politician

Ontario MPP
- In office 1975–1990
- Preceded by: Ronald Glen Hodgson
- Succeeded by: Dennis Drainville
- Constituency: Victoria—Haliburton

Personal details
- Born: December 8, 1922; Mariposa Township, Victoria County, Ontario
- Died: September 16, 1998 (aged 75); Hamilton, Ontario
- Political party: Liberal
- Spouse: Iris May
- Children: 3
- Occupation: Barber

John F. Eakins (December 8, 1922 - September 16, 1998) was a politician in Ontario, Canada. He was a Liberal member of the Legislative Assembly of Ontario from 1975 to 1990 who represented the riding of Victoria—Haliburton. He served as a Cabinet Minister in the government of David Peterson.

== Background ==
Eakins was born in Mariposa Township in Victoria County, Ontario and educated in Lindsay, Ontario. Eakins was a barber and hairdresser. Eakin was predeceased by his wife, Iris, who died in the mid-1980s and they had three children.

== Politics ==
He served as a councillor in Lindsay for three years, and as Mayor for six. As Mayor, he led the twinning of the Town of Lindsay with Nayoro, Hokkaido, and Japan in 1969. Eakins was also a governor of Fleming College, and a member of the Royal Canadian Legion. He also served as Warden of Victoria County, Ontario.

He first sought election to the Ontario legislature in the 1967 provincial election, but lost to Progressive Conservative Glen Hodgson by 2,016 votes in Victoria—Haliburton. He ran again in the 1971 election and lost to Hodgson by 2,119 votes.

The Ontario Liberal Party increased its legislative representation in the 1975 provincial election, and Eakins defeated Hodgson by 1,023 votes in his third attempt. He was re-elected by greater margins in the elections of 1977, 1981, 1985 and 1987.

After serving in opposition for forty-two years, the Liberal Party formed a minority government after the 1985 election. David Peterson, the province's new Premier, appointed Eakins as his Minister of Tourism and Recreation on June 26, 1985. He held this position until September 29, 1987, when he was appointed as Minister of Municipal Affairs. He left cabinet on August 2, 1989.

Eakins did not run in the 1990 election.

=== Cabinet positions ===
Ontario provincial government of David Peterson
Cabinet posts (2)
Predecessor	Office	Successor
Bernard Grandmaitre	Minister of Municipal Affairs; 1987-1989	John Sweeney
Claude Bennett	Minister of Tourism and Recreation; 1985-1987	Hugh O'Neil

== Later life ==
After leaving provincial office, he remained active in the Rotary Club of Lindsay and numerous other community activities. Eakins was the driving force behind the creation of the Lindsay and District Sports Hall of Fame, which was developed to honour athletes, coaches and supporters of sporting activities in the County.

Eakins died in 1998, after undergoing cancer treatments in Hamilton, Ontario.
