= Joseph Marrese =

Canadian politician (1922–2012)

Joseph Anthony Marrese (March 12, 1922 – April 18, 2012) was an Italian-born Canadian realtor and politician. He was a member of the Toronto Metropolitan Separate School Board for most of the period between 1966 and 1983, and was its chair from 1972 to 1975. His political career ended following a criminal conviction in November 1983.

== Early political career ==
Marrese was born on March 12, 1922, in Italy, and moved to Canada with his family during the mid-1920s at the age of two. He was a successful realtor in Metropolitan Toronto before entering political life. He was first elected to the Separate School Board's thirteenth ward in 1966, aged 43, and was re-elected without opposition in 1969. By 1971, he was chairman of the board's planning and development committee. During the 1971 provincial election, he encouraged Catholic residents of York—Forest Hill to support Liberal candidate Philip Givens, because of Givens' support for funding separate schools.

In January 1972, Marrese was selected without opposition as chairman of the Separate School Board. Following his selection, Marrese argued that the children of immigrants should start their education in their first language. He articulated an anti-abortion position on behalf of the board, and forwarded the board's correspondence on abortion with Premier Bill Davis to all Catholic hospitals in Ontario. Marrese was again returned without opposition in 1972 and 1974. His disputes with the Toronto Board of Education over school-sharing were frequently covered in the local media in this period. In early 1975, he was replaced as Separate School Board chairman by Joseph Grittani.

== Provincial campaign ==
He resigned from the school board to campaign as a Progressive Conservative candidate in the 1975 provincial election. He acknowledged that the Conservatives had been considered a "WASP party" in the past, but argued that this image was no longer accurate. He received 4,637 votes (24.63%), finishing third against New Democratic Party candidate Tony Grande in Oakwood.

== Return to municipal politics ==
Marrese ran for an aldermanic position in North York in the 1976 municipal election, and finished third against Mario Gentile in the city's second ward. During this election, there were allegations that representatives from the Marrese campaign tried to persuade Gentile and a third candidate to withdraw from the contest. Some speculated that the provincial Progressive Conservatives trying to influence the result of the election. Both Marrese and the Conservatives denied the charges.

Marrese was re-elected to the Metro Separate School Board in 1978, representing Ward Twenty-One in the Jane and Finch area. During the campaign, he argued that too many board decisions were made in private session and said he would work to ensure continued cooperation with the North York School Board. He was re-elected in 1980, and unsuccessfully challenged Paul Duggan for the chairmanship of the board in November 1981. In December 1981, Marrese argued that members of the North York Public School Board and the Metro Separate School Board should be appointed to North City's city planning board. He claimed this step was necessary to ensure the proper sale of school properties in later years.

== Controversy and conviction ==
Marrese's 1982 re-election bid was marked by two separate controversies. He was arrested on June 16, 1982 on charges of "breach of trust, and as a public official seeking to accept a reward and agreeing to vote for consideration" relating to the sale of the school board's former headquarters on Laird Drive. At around the same time, fellow trustee Antonio Signoroni suggested that Marrese may have been in a conflict-of-interest by voting to give school board contracts to his cousin Peter Caruso, a trustee on the North York Board of Education with whom Marrese shared an office. Marrese acknowledged that the contracts in question were awarded to Caruso, but denied any wrongdoing and said that he had never shown preference to his cousin. He questioned Signoroni's motives in raising the matter, noting that another of his relatives was challenging Signoroni in the 1982 election. Notwithstanding the controversies, Marrese was again re-elected for Ward Thirteen in the 1982 Toronto municipal election. Marrese's trial took place in late 1983. He was formally charged with one count of breach of trust and six counts of accepting a benefit. His accuser, John Lonergan, testified that Marrese approached him in June 1982 and "asked to be paid $30,000 for ensuring that the [separate school] board accepted a $1,925,000 offer". Marrese pleaded not guilty to all charges. His lawyer argued that Marrese had been set up by Lonergan, a charge that Lonergan denied.

The six acceptance charges against Marrese were dismissed on a legal technicality in mid-October 1983, when the judge ruled that a school trustee cannot be considered a municipal official. Defending himself against the remaining breach-of-trust charge, Marrese told the court that he had only agreed to make an improper financial arrangement with Lonergan to procure evidence that the realtor was trying to bribe him. He testified that he had been planning to take his evidence to the next board meeting in order "to reveal the bribe and vote against Lonergan's offer"; this course of action was, he added, made impossible by his arrest. In his closing remarks, the Crown council described Marrese's explanation as "unmitigated lies" and "nonsense". The judge agreed, describing Marrese's testimony as "untruthful" and "a total fabrication". Marrese was found guilty of breach-of-trust on November 7, 1983. Marrese's criminal conviction meant that he automatically lost his seat on the separate school board. Jack Graham, the board's acting chairman, described the conviction as the most embarrassing incident in the history of Catholic education in Ontario. On November 23, Marrese was stripped of his real estate license and sentenced to a year in prison. He was forced to resign from the Ontario Mortgage Corp. and the Ontario Land Corp. At the time of his arrest, Marrese served as director of the Toronto Columbus Lions Club, and vice-president of the Italian-Canadian Benevolent Fund.

== Late career ==
Marrese worked as a real estate broker following his release. In 1986, he made an unsuccessful bid to purchase the rights for property development on a North York city block surrounded by Yonge, Princess, Empress and Doris Streets. Marrese offered to pay $21 million for land valued at $10 million, an offer that North York Mayor Mel Lastman described as "ludicrous". He died on April 18, 2012, aged 90.
