= Fred Burr =

Canadian politician (1911–2006)

Ontario MPP
- In office 1975–1977
- Preceded by: New riding
- Succeeded by: Dave Cooke
- Constituency: Windsor—Riverside
- In office 1967–1975
- Preceded by: New riding
- Succeeded by: Riding abolished
- Constituency: Sandwich-Riverside

Personal details
- Born: February 26, 1911; Middlesex County, Ontario
- Died: January 17, 2006 (aged 94); Kincardine, Ontario
- Political party: New Democrat
- Spouse: Dorothy
- Children: 3
- Occupation: Teacher

Frederick Arthur Burr (February 26, 1911 – January 17, 2006) was a politician in Ontario, Canada. He was a New Democratic member of the Legislative Assembly of Ontario from 1967 to 1977 who represented the ridings of Sandwich-Riverside and Windsor—Riverside.

== Background ==
Born in Middlesex County, Ontario, to Arthur Edward Burr and Emily Rose Vernon, Burr had a long career as a high school teacher at Walkerville Collegiate Institute where he taught Latin and Greek for 34 years.

His son, Dave Burr served one term as the mayor of Windsor, Ontario. In addition to his son, Burr had two daughters, Sheila and Maureen, and was pre-deceased by his wife, Dorothy.

== Politics ==
Burr ran in the 1945 federal election in the riding of Essex West. He came in third to Liberal candidate Donald Ferguson Brown. He tried four more times in provincial and federal elections before winning in the 1967 provincial election by 799 votes. In the next provincial election in 1971, he won by 10,000 votes.

While his tenure as an MPP was spent in Opposition, he was known as a forward-thinking member, asking questions about solar power and the effects of freon as far back as 1974 and was regarded as one of the first politicians to take up the cause of second-hand tobacco smoke.
