= Ronald Glen Hodgson =

Canadian politician

Glen Hodgson

Ontario MPP
- In office 1967–1975
- Preceded by: New riding
- Succeeded by: John Eakins
- Constituency: Victoria—Haliburton
- In office 1963–1967
- Preceded by: Leslie Frost
- Succeeded by: Riding abolished
- Constituency: Victoria

Personal details
- Born: May 5, 1926 Haliburton, Ontario
- Died: December 12, 1996 (aged 70)
- Party: Progressive Conservative
- Spouse: Shirley May Hamilton
- Relations: Chris Hodgson, nephew
- Children: 4
- Occupation: Forester

Ronald Glen Hodgson (May 5, 1926 – December 12, 1996) was a politician in Ontario, Canada. He was a Progressive Conservative member in the Legislative Assembly of Ontario from 1963 to 1975.

== Background ==
Hodgson was born in Haliburton, Ontario. His parents were C. Wesley Hodgson and Phyllis Dart, both born in Britain. In 1950 he married Shirley May Hamilton. Together they raised four children. He was a partner and owner of a logging operation in Haliburton county. He was an honorary member for 28 years in the Ontario Forest Products Accident Prevention Association. His nephew, Chris Hodgson was elected as Progressive Conservative member in the same riding in 1994.

== Politics ==
He served as a councillor for the town of Dysart. He was elected in the 1963 provincial election in the riding of Victoria. He was re-elected in the redistributed riding of Victoria—Haliburton in the 1967 and 1971 elections. During his time in office he served as a backbench supporter of the governments of John Robarts and Bill Davis. He retired from politics in 1975.
