= 1975 Ontario general election =

Canadian provincial election

- September 18, 1975

125 seats in the 30th Legislative Assembly of Ontario 63 seats were needed for a majority
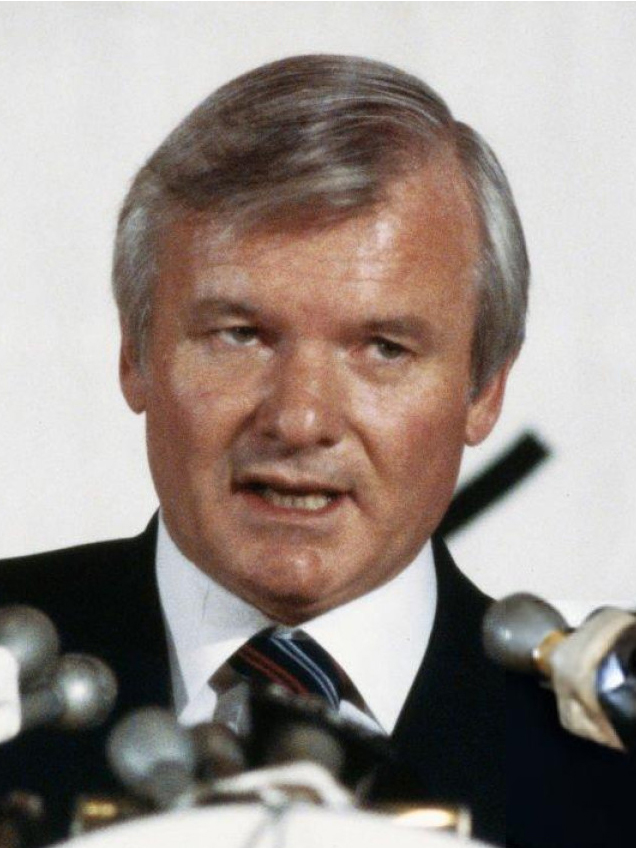

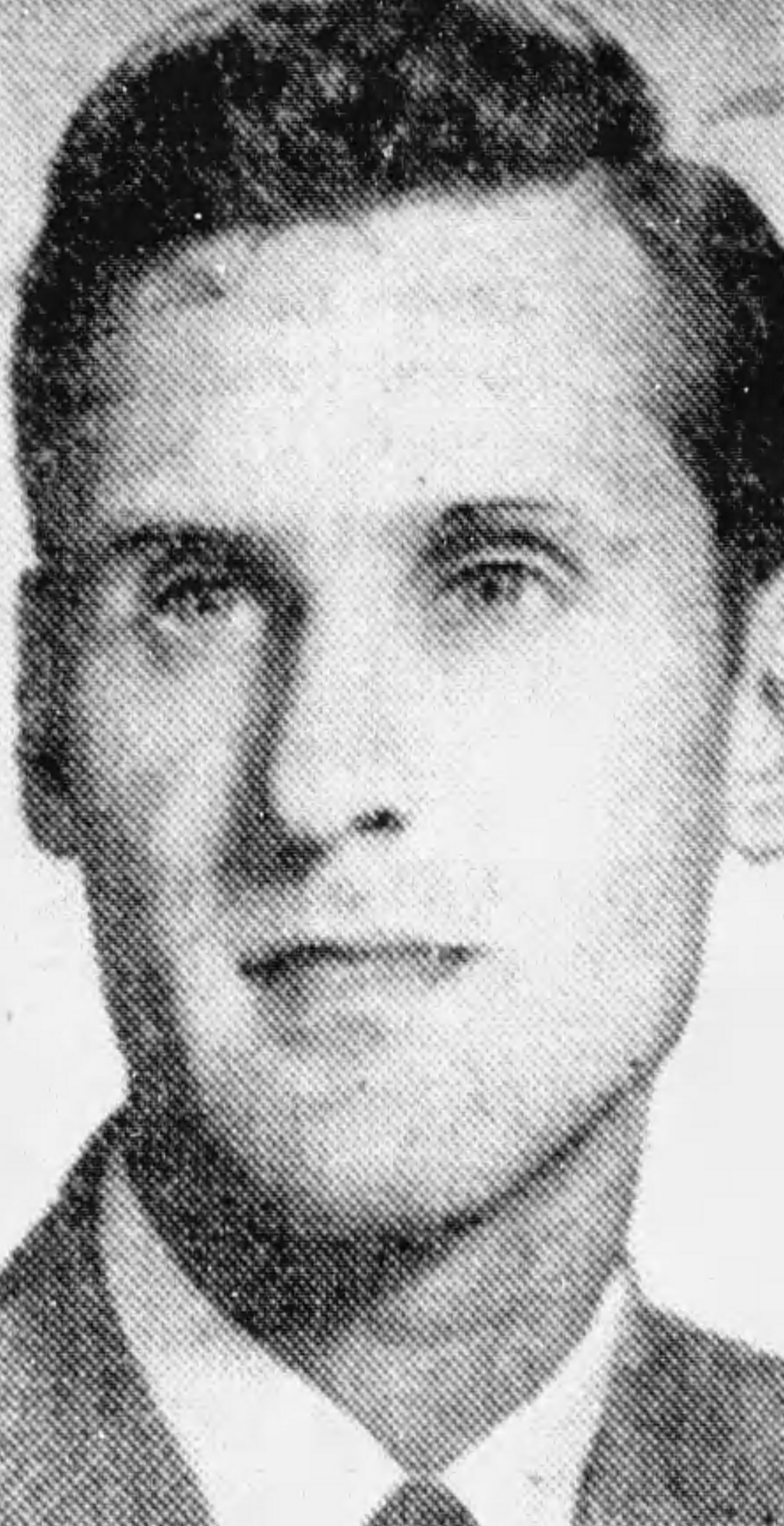

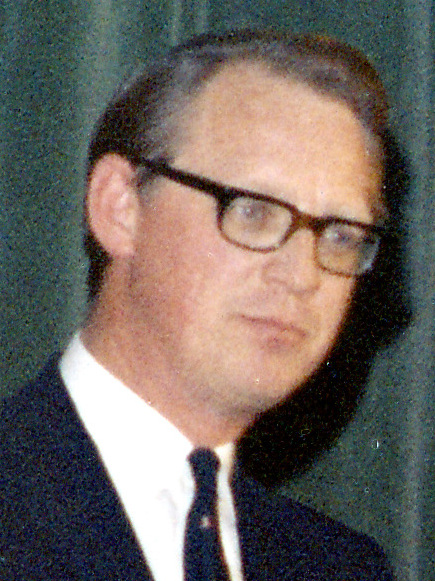
	First party	Second party	Third party
Leader	Bill Davis	Stephen Lewis	Robert Nixon
Party	Progressive Conservative	New Democratic	Liberal
Leader since	February 12, 1971	October 4, 1970	January 6, 1967
Leader's seat	Brampton	Scarborough West	Brant—Oxford—Norfolk
Last election	78	19	20
Seats won	51	38	36
Seat change	▼27	▲19	▲16
Popular vote	1,192,592	956,904	1,125,615
Percentage	36.07%	28.94%	34.04%
Swing	▼8.43pp	▲1.79pp	▲6.29pp
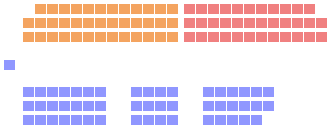
Premier before election
Bill Davis
Progressive Conservative
Premier after election
Bill Davis
Progressive Conservative

The 1975 Ontario general election was held on September 18, 1975, to elect the 125 members of the 30th Legislative Assembly of Ontario (Members of Provincial Parliament, or "MPPs") of the Province of Ontario, Canada.

The Ontario Progressive Conservative Party, led by Bill Davis and campaigning under the slogan, "Your Future. Your choice.", won a tenth consecutive term in office but lost its majority in the legislature for the first time since the 1945 election. The PC party lost 27 seats from its result in the previous election.

The social democratic Ontario New Democratic Party, led by Stephen Lewis with the slogan "Tomorrow starts today", doubled its representation in the legislature, and became the Official Opposition on the strength of a campaign which called for rent control in Ontario and highlighted horror stories of individuals victimized by bad landlords who imposed exorbitant rent increases. The campaign forced Davis' Tories to promise to implement rent controls shortly before the election.

The Ontario Liberal Party, led by Robert Nixon, won 16 additional seats, but lost the role of Official Opposition to the NDP. One member of its caucus was elected as a Liberal-Labour candidate.

== Expansion of Legislative Assembly ==
An Act passed in May 1975 provided for an increase from 117 to 125 MPPs in the next Assembly:

Abolished ridings	New ridings
Drawn from parts of other ridings
	Brock (Note: from part of Lincoln)
	London Centre (Note: from parts of London North and London South)
	Scarborough—Ellesmere (Note: from parts of Scarborough North, Scarborough West and Scarborough Centre)
	Wilson Heights (Note: from part of Downsview)
Reorganization of ridings
Halton East; Halton West	Burlington South; Halton—Burlington; Oakville
Glengarry; Grenville—Dundas; Stormont	Carleton-Grenville; Cornwall; Stormont—Dundas—Glengarry
Huron; Middlesex North; Middlesex South	Huron—Middlesex; Middlesex
York-Forest Hill; York South	Oakwood; Oriole; York South
Division of ridings
Peel North	Brampton; Mississauga North
Waterloo South	Cambridge; Kitchener—Wilmot
Peel South	Mississauga East; Mississauga South
Renaming of ridings
Brant	Brant—Oxford—Norfolk
Welland South	Erie
Essex—Kent	Essex North
Grey South	Grey
Hastings	Hastings—Peterborough
High Park	High Park—Swansea
Kent	Kent—Elgin
Thunder Bay	Lake Nipigon
Wellington—Dufferin	Wellington—Dufferin—Peel
Sandwich—Riverside	Windsor—Riverside
Windsor West	Windsor—Sandwich
Consequential renaming of ridings on the creation of the Regional Municipality of Durham
Durham; Ontario; Ontario South	Durham East; Durham North; Durham West

== Campaign ==
Riding contests, by number of candidates (1976)
Candidates	PC	Lib	LL	NDP	Comm	Ind	Ltn	SC	NAL	Total
3	66	64	2	66						198
4	41	41		41	19	5	9	6	2	164
5	15	15		15	11	7	6	5	1	75
6	2	2		2	2	3		1		12
7	1	1		1	1	2		1		7
Total	125	123	2	125	33	17	15	13	3	456

Among the independent candidates, there were 12 from the Social Credit League of Ontario who were not officially recognized as such as the party did not qualify for official party status under the Election Finances Reform Act, 1975.

== Opinion polls ==
Evolution of voting intentions at provincial level
Polling firm	Last day of survey	Source	PCO	ONDP	OLP	Other	ME	Sample
Election 1975	September 18, 1975		36.07	28.94	34.04	0.95		
—N/a	March 1975		30	—N/a	42	—N/a	—N/a	
Election 1971	June 9, 1977		44.5	27.1	27.8	0.6		

== Results ==
=== Summary ===
Elections to the 30th Parliament of Ontario (1975)
Political party	Party leader	MPPs				Votes			
Political party	Party leader	Candidates	1971	1975	±	#	±	%	± (pp)
Progressive Conservative	Bill Davis	125	78	51	27▼	1,192,592	272,721▼	36.07%	8.43▼
New Democratic	Stephen Lewis	125	19	38	19▲	956,904	63,025▲	28.94%	1.79▲
Liberal	Robert Nixon	123	20	35	15▲	1,125,615	211,873▲	34.04%	6.29▲
Liberal–Labour	Robert Nixon	2	–	1	1▲	9,066	9,066▲	0.27%	Returned
Communist	William Stewart	33	–	–	–	9,120	7,500▲	0.28%	0.23▲
Libertarian	Terry Coughlin	15	–	–	–	4,437	4,437▲	0.13%	New
Social Credit	Alcide Hamelin	13	–	–	–	4,146	2,942▲	0.13%	0.09▲
Independent		17	–	–	–	4,093	12,866▼	0.12%	0.40▼
North American Labour		3	–	–	–	424	424▲	0.01%	New
Total		456	117	125		3,306,397		100.00%	
Rejected ballots						17,937	122▼		
Voter turnout						3,310,776	13,558▲	67.82	5.71▼
Registered electors						4,503,142	398,635▲		

=== Vote and seat summaries ===
Ternary plots - shift of electoral support (1971-1975)
1971

1975
Electoral districts identified by colours of winning parties

Seats and popular vote by party
Party	Seats	Votes	Change (pp)
█ Progressive Conservative	51 / 125	36.07%	-8.43
█ New Democratic	38 / 125	28.94%	1.79
█ Liberal/Liberal-Labour	36 / 125	34.31%	6.56
█ Independent	0 / 125	0.12%	-0.40
█ Other	0 / 125	0.56%	0.48

=== Synopsis of results ===
Results by riding - 1975 Ontario general election
Riding	Winning party						Turnout (Note: including spoilt ballots)	Votes					
Name (Note: order is as given in EO reports)	1971	Party	Votes	Share	Margin #	Margin %	Turnout	PC	Lib/LL	NDP	Ind	Other	Total
Algoma	PC	NDP	4,923	38.57%	398	3.12%	72.02%	4,525	3,315	4,923	–	–	12,763
Algoma—Manitoulin	PC	PC	5,452	40.79%	1,127	8.43%	72.28%	5,452	3,589	4,325	–	–	13,366
Brampton	New	PC	16,432	43.66%	5,608	14.90%	72.11%	16,432	9,906	10,824	65	410	37,637
Brantford	PC	NDP	12,012	39.06%	2,450	7.97%	72.65%	9,063	9,562	12,012	–	115	30,752
Brant—Oxford—Norfolk	Lib	Lib	14,358	55.52%	7,934	30.68%	69.71%	6,424	14,358	4,721	–	358	25,861
Brock	New	PC	10,978	48.31%	5,067	22.30%	65.69%	10,978	5,911	5,836	–	–	22,725
Burlington South	New	PC	17,093	45.83%	5,751	15.42%	69.50%	17,093	11,342	8,859	–	–	37,294
Cambridge	New	NDP	11,255	38.14%	1,593	5.40%	66.96%	8,595	9,662	11,255	–	–	29,512
Carleton	PC	PC	12,653	38.87%	676	2.08%	68.68%	12,653	11,977	7,769	157	–	32,556
Carleton East	PC	NDP	11,982	36.02%	281	0.84%	66.58%	9,579	11,701	11,982	–	–	33,262
Carleton-Grenville	New	PC	12,759	53.80%	7,027	29.63%	68.88%	12,759	5,226	5,732	–	–	23,717
Chatham—Kent	PC	PC	10,146	43.73%	2,819	12.15%	61.68%	10,146	7,327	5,728	–	–	23,201
Cochrane North	PC	PC	9,987	61.74%	6,220	38.45%	66.45%	9,987	2,423	3,767	–	–	16,177
Cochrane South	NDP	NDP	11,073	47.87%	1,292	5.59%	68.42%	9,781	1,958	11,073	114	205	23,131
Cornwall	New	NDP	11,958	51.05%	2,682	11.45%	70.41%	9,276	2,191	11,958	–	–	23,425
Dufferin—Simcoe	PC	PC	14,201	45.88%	1,691	5.46%	68.52%	14,201	12,510	3,585	–	655	30,951
Durham East	PC	NDP	12,893	42.26%	2,229	7.31%	70.16%	10,664	6,696	12,893	–	258	30,511
Durham North	PC	PC	11,206	39.28%	111	0.39%	74.12%	11,206	11,095	6,230	–	–	28,531
Durham West	PC	NDP	11,356	38.99%	1,314	4.51%	72.71%	7,579	10,042	11,356	–	149	29,126
Elgin	PC	PC	11,880	43.98%	1,829	6.77%	71.27%	11,880	10,051	5,084	–	–	27,015
Erie	Lib	Lib	9,556	45.27%	2,650	12.55%	69.35%	4,646	9,556	6,906	–	–	21,108
Essex North	Lib	Lib	9,550	44.05%	1,872	8.64%	67.73%	4,451	9,550	7,678	–	–	21,679
Essex South	Lib	Lib	9,517	41.34%	2,122	9.22%	67.05%	7,395	9,517	6,108	–	–	23,020
Fort William	PC	NDP	9,173	36.59%	953	3.80%	64.61%	8,220	7,444	9,173	–	230	25,067
Frontenac—Addington	PC	Lib	10,372	44.63%	1,415	6.09%	70.78%	8,957	10,372	3,368	545	–	23,242
Grey	PC	Lib	11,686	45.02%	277	1.07%	73.81%	11,409	11,686	2,863	–	–	25,958
Grey—Bruce	Lib	Lib	14,193	55.39%	5,964	23.28%	75.71%	8,229	14,193	3,202	–	–	25,624
Haldimand—Norfolk	PC	Lib	13,976	45.36%	1,955	6.35%	71.99%	12,021	13,976	4,814	–	–	30,811
Halton—Burlington	New	Lib	10,998	39.14%	463	1.65%	72.75%	10,535	10,998	6,567	–	–	28,100
Hamilton Centre	NDP	NDP	8,114	38.43%	586	2.78%	56.70%	5,256	7,528	8,114	–	214	21,112
Hamilton East	NDP	NDP	14,415	47.89%	5,736	19.06%	64.10%	6,407	8,679	14,415	–	601	30,102
Hamilton Mountain	PC	PC	12,769	38.80%	1,727	5.25%	72.64%	12,769	8,921	11,042	–	177	32,909
Hamilton West	PC	Lib	10,583	38.34%	542	1.96%	66.04%	10,041	10,583	6,978	–	–	27,602
Hastings—Peterborough	PC	PC	10,912	47.89%	2,341	10.27%	71.01%	10,912	8,571	2,969	–	335	22,787
Huron—Bruce	Lib	Lib	16,276	65.70%	10,393	41.95%	73.52%	5,883	16,276	2,613	–	–	24,772
Huron—Middlesex	New	Lib	11,893	54.04%	3,795	17.24%	76.12%	8,098	11,893	2,018	–	–	22,009
Kenora	PC	PC	9,584	52.42%	4,060	22.21%	67.40%	9,584	3,174	5,524	–	–	18,282
Kent—Elgin	Lib	Lib	12,793	56.57%	5,232	23.13%	70.31%	7,561	12,793	2,262	–	–	22,616
Kingston and the Islands	PC	PC	9,442	37.82%	203	0.81%	65.01%	9,442	9,239	6,161	–	124	24,966
Kitchener	Lib	Lib	13,036	44.83%	4,710	16.20%	63.50%	8,326	13,036	7,327	–	392	29,081
Kitchener—Wilmot	New	Lib	9,929	40.71%	1,745	7.16%	64.38%	6,275	9,929	8,184	–	–	24,388
Lake Nipigon	NDP	NDP	7,114	59.38%	4,014	33.51%	66.78%	1,766	3,100	7,114	–	–	11,980
Lambton	PC	PC	11,042	51.53%	1,836	8.57%	73.00%	11,042	9,206	1,180	–	–	21,428
Lanark	PC	PC	11,641	56.58%	5,799	28.18%	72.17%	11,641	5,842	3,092	–	–	20,575
Leeds	PC	PC	13,913	58.21%	8,197	34.29%	70.69%	13,913	4,274	5,716	–	–	23,903
Lincoln	PC	Lib	8,995	42.84%	1,094	5.21%	69.87%	7,901	8,995	4,100	–	–	20,996
London Centre	New	Lib	11,572	40.37%	2,569	8.96%	61.12%	9,003	11,572	7,878	213	–	28,666
London North	PC	Lib	13,689	44.65%	2,282	7.44%	66.71%	11,407	13,689	5,560	–	–	30,656
London South	PC	Lib	14,496	40.94%	559	1.58%	64.25%	13,937	14,496	6,971	–	–	35,404
Middlesex	New	PC	10,092	44.97%	869	3.87%	72.34%	10,092	9,223	3,125	–	–	22,440
Mississauga East	New	PC	9,973	39.05%	1,335	5.23%	64.95%	9,973	8,638	6,499	432	–	25,542
Mississauga North	New	PC	11,001	35.55%	385	1.24%	67.33%	11,001	9,332	10,616	–	–	30,949
Mississauga South	New	PC	11,870	43.04%	3,144	11.40%	69.04%	11,870	8,726	6,981	–	–	27,577
Muskoka	PC	PC	7,061	43.97%	1,376	8.57%	68.73%	7,061	3,200	5,685	–	111	16,057
Niagara Falls	PC	Lib	10,594	37.80%	172	0.61%	65.02%	10,422	10,594	7,013	–	–	28,029
Nickel Belt	NDP	NDP	10,243	60.09%	6,209	36.42%	72.60%	4,034	2,770	10,243	–	–	17,047
Nipissing	Lib	Lib	15,483	54.35%	8,244	28.94%	69.44%	7,239	15,483	5,110	658	–	28,490
Northumberland	PC	PC	13,328	44.58%	3,001	10.04%	72.44%	13,328	10,327	6,241	–	–	29,896
Oakville	New	PC	12,933	45.84%	3,759	13.32%	74.29%	12,933	9,174	6,011	–	97	28,215
Oshawa	PC	NDP	14,638	58.94%	7,787	31.35%	63.27%	6,851	3,202	14,638	–	146	24,837
Ottawa Centre	NDP	NDP	11,658	41.07%	2,680	9.44%	62.19%	8,978	7,500	11,658	–	250	28,386
Ottawa East	Lib	Lib	14,900	60.96%	9,899	40.50%	53.08%	5,001	14,900	4,543	–	–	24,444
Ottawa South	PC	PC	14,767	43.15%	3,668	10.72%	67.88%	14,767	8,360	11,099	–	–	34,226
Ottawa West	PC	PC	14,889	44.34%	5,063	15.08%	66.10%	14,889	9,826	8,861	–	–	33,576
Oxford	PC	PC	17,776	50.72%	5,181	14.78%	71.77%	17,776	12,595	4,676	–	–	35,047
Parry Sound	PC	PC	8,154	44.56%	966	5.28%	66.77%	8,154	7,188	2,957	–	–	18,299
Perth	Lib	Lib	17,865	63.36%	10,478	37.16%	65.17%	7,387	17,865	2,945	–	–	28,197
Peterborough	PC	NDP	16,154	39.53%	505	1.24%	71.23%	15,649	8,979	16,154	–	83	40,865
Port Arthur	NDP	NDP	12,213	49.74%	4,618	18.81%	66.36%	7,595	4,499	12,213	–	247	24,554
Prescott and Russell	PC	PC	11,006	43.93%	2,045	8.16%	68.85%	11,006	8,961	5,085	–	–	25,052
Prince Edward—Lennox	PC	PC	9,628	44.32%	733	3.37%	74.37%	9,628	8,895	3,200	–	–	21,723
Quinte	PC	Lib	12,440	43.07%	659	2.28%	67.95%	11,781	12,440	4,663	–	–	28,884
Rainy River	Lib	LL	5,892	51.58%	2,657	23.26%	64.77%	3,235	5,892 (Note: T. Patrick Reid was elected as a Liberal in 1971)	2,295	–	–	11,422
Renfrew North	PC	Lib	7,058	35.41%	183	0.92%	70.90%	6,875	7,058	6,001	–	–	19,934
Renfrew South	PC	PC	13,886	54.20%	5,819	22.71%	75.49%	13,886	8,067	3,267	–	401	25,621
St. Catharines	PC	PC	10,064	34.74%	794	2.74%	59.77%	10,064	9,270	9,215	–	419	28,968
Sarnia	Lib	Lib	16,275	57.69%	7,502	26.59%	63.97%	8,773	16,275	2,957	–	204	28,209
Sault Ste. Marie	PC	PC	14,415	42.46%	945	2.78%	70.91%	14,415	5,835	13,470	–	232	33,952
Simcoe Centre	PC	PC	13,557	39.52%	1,929	5.62%	69.48%	13,557	9,116	11,628	–	–	34,301
Simcoe East	PC	PC	11,622	39.48%	1,140	3.87%	69.35%	11,622	7,334	10,482	–	–	29,438
Stormont—Dundas—Glengarry	New	PC	10,833	52.54%	3,851	18.68%	68.99%	10,833	6,982	2,804	–	–	20,619
Sudbury	NDP	NDP	12,258	38.35%	2,278	7.13%	74.53%	9,549	9,980	12,258	–	175	31,962
Sudbury East	NDP	NDP	18,765	58.84%	9,476	29.71%	74.04%	3,837	9,289	18,765	–	–	31,891
Temiskaming	PC	NDP	8,713	44.07%	1,544	7.81%	68.53%	7,169	3,546	8,713	175	170	19,773
Victoria—Haliburton	PC	Lib	10,907	43.53%	1,023	4.08%	70.64%	9,884	10,907	3,707	–	556	25,054
Waterloo North	Lib	Lib	12,409	47.49%	5,265	20.15%	64.40%	7,144	12,409	6,576	–	–	26,129
Welland	PC	NDP	9,994	36.88%	1,115	4.11%	71.26%	8,879	8,000	9,994	–	223	27,096
Wellington—Dufferin—Peel	PC	PC	12,110	40.61%	712	2.39%	69.50%	12,110	11,398	6,313	–	–	29,821
Wellington South	Lib	Lib	15,654	50.69%	7,886	25.54%	68.36%	7,063	15,654	7,768	252	145	30,882
Wentworth	NDP	NDP	14,847	58.73%	9,577	37.89%	68.32%	5,270	5,162	14,847	–	–	25,279
Wentworth North	PC	Lib	13,242	40.56%	1,977	6.06%	72.56%	11,265	13,242	8,140	–	–	32,647
Windsor—Riverside	NDP	NDP	13,273	47.85%	2,479	8.94%	61.67%	3,671	10,794	13,273	–	–	27,738
Windsor—Sandwich	NDP	NDP	10,624	49.73%	3,067	14.36%	58.25%	2,732	7,557	10,624	265	184	21,362
Windsor—Walkerville	Lib	Lib	12,517	53.28%	5,672	24.14%	63.52%	3,979	12,517	6,845	–	153	23,494
York Centre	Lib	Lib	14,913	40.96%	1,830	5.03%	69.10%	13,083	14,913	8,140	–	275	36,411
York North	PC	PC	12,891	39.65%	2,525	7.77%	68.40%	12,891	10,366	9,256	–	–	32,513
Armourdale	PC	Lib	14,526	43.90%	2,702	8.17%	68.91%	11,824	14,526	6,169	–	567	33,086
Beaches—Woodbine	PC	NDP	11,462	45.58%	2,886	11.48%	66.65%	8,576	4,914	11,462	–	195	25,147
Bellwoods	PC	NDP	4,935	38.38%	494	3.84%	64.90%	3,234	4,441	4,935	–	247	12,857
Don Mills	PC	PC	14,007	46.59%	5,933	19.74%	60.68%	14,007	7,981	8,074	–	–	30,062
Dovercourt	PC	NDP	6,083	42.10%	1,465	10.14%	63.87%	4,618	3,174	6,083	96	477	14,448
Downsview	Lib	NDP	8,091	36.90%	68	0.31%	65.70%	5,814	8,023	8,091	–	–	21,928
Eglinton	PC	PC	16,679	50.97%	5,894	18.01%	68.94%	16,679	10,785	4,706	–	551	32,721
Etobicoke	Lib	NDP	9,016	37.62%	1,256	5.24%	67.04%	7,191	7,760	9,016	–	–	23,967
High Park—Swansea	NDP	NDP	10,172	39.84%	1,844	7.22%	68.77%	8,328	6,540	10,172	–	493	25,533
Humber	PC	PC	17,739	44.51%	3,337	8.37%	71.58%	17,739	14,402	7,710	–	–	39,851
Lakeshore	NDP	NDP	14,271	51.01%	7,625	27.26%	65.74%	6,281	6,646	14,271	175	602	27,975
Oakwood	New	NDP	7,388	39.25%	1,418	7.53%	59.66%	4,637	5,970	7,388	558	271	18,824
Oriole	New	PC	12,297	38.71%	239	0.75%	68.00%	12,297	12,058	7,413	–	–	31,768
Parkdale	NDP	NDP	7,158	41.71%	1,559	9.08%	63.23%	3,816	5,599	7,158	292	298	17,163
Riverdale	NDP	NDP	9,133	50.27%	4,268	23.49%	59.48%	4,865	3,754	9,133	96	319	18,167
St. Andrew—St. Patrick	PC	PC	8,054	36.66%	429	1.95%	62.57%	8,054	5,951	7,625	–	339	21,969
St. David	PC	PC	10,536	40.27%	2,493	9.53%	66.43%	10,536	7,141	8,043	–	442	26,162
St. George	PC	Lib	11,042	42.10%	2,465	9.40%	60.70%	8,577	11,042	6,029	–	582	26,230
Scarborough Centre	PC	PC	10,399	41.15%	1,037	4.10%	64.13%	10,399	5,042	9,362	–	469	25,272
Scarborough East	PC	PC	12,645	42.59%	3,836	12.92%	66.94%	12,645	8,809	7,850	–	383	29,687
Scarborough—Ellesmere	New	NDP	10,573	39.00%	1,347	4.97%	67.73%	9,226	7,019	10,573	–	295	27,113
Scarborough North	PC	PC	16,512	43.41%	2,677	7.04%	70.03%	16,512	13,835	7,241	–	447	38,035
Scarborough West	NDP	NDP	15,815	57.39%	8,603	31.22%	70.20%	7,212	4,393	15,815	–	135	27,555
Wilson Heights	New	Lib	11,379	42.26%	2,640	9.81%	61.95%	8,739	11,379	6,441	–	366	26,925
York East	PC	PC	14,487	47.42%	5,496	17.99%	66.05%	14,487	8,991	5,919	–	1,152	30,549
York Mills	PC	PC	17,365	46.46%	4,075	10.90%	70.81%	17,365	13,290	6,720	–	–	37,375
York South	NDP	NDP	13,282	48.47%	6,218	22.69%	67.30%	7,064	6,445	13,282	–	609	27,400
York West	PC	PC	13,871	38.70%	1,356	3.78%	71.33%	13,871	12,515	9,454	–	–	35,840
Yorkview	NDP	NDP	13,406	52.40%	5,320	20.79%	63.02%	3,498	8,086	13,406	–	594	25,584

= open seat
= turnout is above provincial average
= winning candidate was in previous Legislature
= not incumbent; was previously elected to the Legislature
= incumbent had switched allegiance
= incumbency arose from byelection gain
= previously incumbent in another riding
= Liberal-Labour candidate
= other incumbents renominated
= multiple candidates

=== Analysis ===
Party candidates in 2nd place
Party in 1st place	Party in 2nd place			Total
Party in 1st place	PC	Lib	NDP	Total
Progressive Conservative		17	34	51
New Democratic	20		18	38
Liberal	30	5		35
Liberal–Labour	1			1
Total	51	22	52	125

Candidates ranked 1st to 5th place, by party
Parties	1st	2nd	3rd	4th	5th
█ Progressive Conservative	51	51	23		
█ New Democratic	38	22	65		
█ Liberal	35	52	36		
█ Liberal–Labour	1		1		
█ Communist				26	7
█ Libertarian				12	3
█ Social Credit				10	2
█ Independent				9	5
█ North American Labour				2	1

Resulting composition of the 28th Legislative Assembly
Source		Party				
Source		PC	NDP	Lib	LL	Total
Seats retained	Incumbents returned	34	15	14		63
Seats retained	Open seats held	5	4	2		11
Seats retained	Held by previous incumbent from other riding	1				1
Seats retained	Incumbent changed to Liberal-Labour				1	1
Seats changing hands	Incumbents defeated		9	7		16
Seats changing hands	Open seats gained		5	6		11
Seats changing hands	Byelection gain held			1		1
Seats changing hands	Ouster of third-party byelection gain		1			1
New ridings	New MPPs	3	3	3		9
New ridings	Previously incumbent in other riding	8	1	2		11
Total		51	38	35	1	125

=== MPPs elected by region and riding ===
Party designations are as follows:

PC
Liberal
NDP
Liberal-Labour

Northern Ontario

- Algoma: Bud Wildman
- Algoma—Manitoulin : John Lane
- Cochrane North: René Brunelle
- Cochrane South: Bill Ferrier
- Fort William: Iain Angus
- Kenora: Leo Bernier
- Lake Nipigon: Jack Stokes
- Nickel Belt: Floyd Laughren
- Nipissing: Richard Smith
- Port Arthur: Jim Foulds
- Rainy River: T. Patrick Reid
- Sault Ste. Marie: John Rhodes
- Sudbury: Bud Germa
- Sudbury East: Elie Martel
- Timiskaming: Robert Bain

Ottawa Valley

- Carleton: Sid Handleman
- Carleton East: Evelyn Gigantes
- Lanark: Douglas Wiseman
- Ottawa Centre: Michael Cassidy
- Ottawa East: Albert Roy
- Ottawa South: Claude Bennett
- Ottawa West: Donald Morrow
- Prescott and Russell: Joseph Albert Bélanger
- Renfrew North: Sean Conway
- Renfrew South: Paul Yakabuski

Saint Lawrence Valley

- Carleton—Grenville: Donald Irvine
- Cornwall: George Samis
- Kingston and the Islands: Keith Norton
- Leeds: James Auld
- Stormont—Dundas—Glengarry: Osie Villeneuve

Central Ontario

- Frontenac—Addington: J. Earl McEwen
- Hastings-Peterborough: Clarke Rollins
- Northumberland: Russell Rowe
- Peterborough: Gillian Sandeman
- Prince Edward—Lennox: James A. Taylor
- Quinte: Hugh O'Neil
- Victoria—Haliburton: John Eakins

Georgian Bay

- Grey-Bruce: Eddie Sargent
- Muskoka: Frank Miller
- Parry Sound: Lorne Maeck
- Simcoe Centre: David Arthur Evans
- Simcoe East: Gordon Elsworth Smith

Hamilton/Halton/Niagara

- Brock: Bob Welch
- Burlington South: George Kerr
- Erie: Ray Haggerty
- Halton—Burlington: Julian Reed
- Hamilton Centre: Mike Davison
- Hamilton East: Robert W. Mackenzie
- Hamilton Mountain: John Smith
- Hamilton West: Stuart Smith
- Lincoln: Ross Hall
- Niagara Falls: Vince Kerrio
- Oakville: James Snow
- St. Catharines: Robert Mercer Johnston
- Welland: Mel Swart
- Wentworth: Ian Deans
- Wentworth North: Eric Cunningham

Midwestern Ontario

- Brantford: Mac Makarchuk
- Brant—Oxford—Norfolk: Robert Nixon
- Cambridge: Monty Davidson
- Dufferin—Simcoe: George McCague
- Grey: Bob McKessock
- Haldimand-Norfolk: Gordon Miller
- Huron–Bruce: Murray Gaunt
- Kitchener: Jim Breithaupt
- Kitchener—Wilmot: John Sweeney
- Oxford: Harry Craig Parrott
- Perth: Hugh Edighoffer
- Waterloo North: Edward R. Good
- Wellington South: Harry Worton
- Wellington—Dufferin—Peel: Jack Johnson

Southwestern Ontario

- Chatham—Kent: Darcy McKeough
- Elgin: Ron McNeil
- Essex North: Dick Ruston
- Essex South: Remo Mancini
- Huron–Middlesex: Jack Riddell
- Kent—Elgin: Jack Spence
- Lambton: Lorne Henderson
- London Centre: David Peterson
- London North: Marvin Shore
- London South: John Ferris
- Middlesex: Robert G. Eaton
- Sarnia: Jim Bullbrook
- Windsor—Riverside: Fred Burr
- Windsor—Sandwich: Ted Bounsall
- Windsor—Walkerville: Bernard Newman

Peel/York/Durham

- Brampton: Bill Davis
- Durham East: Doug Moffatt
- Durham North: Bill Newman
- Durham West: Charles Godfrey
- Mississauga East: Bud Gregory
- Mississauga North: Terry David Jones
- Mississauga South: Douglas Kennedy
- Oshawa: Michael Breaugh
- York Centre: Alfred Stong
- York North: William Hodgson

Metropolitan Toronto

- Armourdale: Philip Givens
- Beaches—Woodbine: Marion Bryden
- Bellwoods: Ross McClellan
- Don Mills: Dennis Timbrell
- Dovercourt: Tony Lupusella
- Downsview: Odoardo Di Santo
- Eglinton: Roy McMurtry
- Etobicoke: Ed Philip
- High Park—Swansea: Ed Ziemba
- Humber: John MacBeth
- Lakeshore: Patrick Lawlor
- Oakwood: Tony Grande
- Oriole: John Reesor Williams
- Parkdale: Jan Dukszta
- Riverdale: Jim Renwick
- St. Andrew—St. Patrick: Larry Grossman
- St. David: Margaret Scrivener
- St. George: Margaret Campbell
- Scarborough Centre: Frank Drea
- Scarborough East: Margaret Birch
- Scarborough North: Thomas Wells
- Scarborough West: Stephen Lewis
- Scarborough—Ellesmere: David Warner
- Wilson Heights: Vernon Singer
- York East: Arthur Meen
- York Mills: Bette Stephenson
- York South: Donald C. MacDonald
- York West: Nick Leluk
- Yorkview: Fred Young

== See also ==
- Politics of Ontario
- List of Ontario political parties
- Premier of Ontario
- Leader of the Opposition (Ontario)
- Progressive Conservative Party of Ontario candidates, 1975 Ontario provincial election
- Independent candidates, 1975 Ontario provincial election
