= Windsor—Riverside =

Sandwich-Riverside (1967-1975) Windsor-Riverside (1975-1999)
Ontario electoral district

Defunct provincial electoral district
- Legislature: Legislative Assembly of Ontario
- District created: 1967
- District abolished: 1996
- First contested: 1967
- Last contested: 1995

Windsor—Riverside was an electoral riding in Ontario, Canada. It was located in the east end of Windsor. The riding was created in 1975 out of Sandwich-Riverside and merged into Windsor—St. Clair and Windsor West in 1996 before the 1999 election.

== Members of Provincial Parliament ==
Sandwich-Riverside
Assembly	Years	Member	Party
28th	1967–1971	Fred Burr	New Democratic
29th	1971–1975	Fred Burr	New Democratic
Riding renamed to Windsor-Riverside
30th	1975–1977	Fred Burr	New Democratic
31st	1977–1981	Dave Cooke	New Democratic
32nd	1981–1985	Dave Cooke	New Democratic
33rd	1985–1987	Dave Cooke	New Democratic
34th	1987–1990	Dave Cooke	New Democratic
35th	1990–1995	Dave Cooke	New Democratic
36th	1995–1997	Dave Cooke	New Democratic
36th	1997–1999	Wayne Lessard	New Democratic
Sourced from the Ontario Legislative Assembly
Merged into merged into Windsor—St. Clair and Windsor West before the 1999 election

== Election results ==
Ontario provincial by-election, Sept. 4, 1997 Resignation of Dave Cooke
Party	Candidate	Votes	%	±%
New Democratic	Wayne Lessard	9,308	43.99	-1.71
Liberal	Gary McNamara	8,494	40.14	+5.31
Progressive Conservative	Fran Funaro	3,028	14.31	-2.12
Green	Steve Harvey	329	1.70	
Total valid votes		21,159	100.0	
Difference		814	3.85	
Total rejected ballots		159	0.75	
Turnout		21,318	42.38	

1995 Ontario general election
Party	Candidate	Votes	%	±%
New Democratic	Dave Cooke	12,347	45.70	-25.33
Liberal	Gary McNamara	9,412	34.83	+12.53
Progressive Conservative	Blaine Tyndall	4,440	16.43	+12.75
Family Coalition	Michel Ozorak	459	1.70	-1.29
Natural Law	Sherry Lanier	362	1.34	
Total valid votes		27,020	100.0	
Difference		2,935	10.86	
Total rejected ballots		298	1.09	
Turnout		27,318	54.02	

1990 Ontario general election
Party	Candidate	Votes	%	±%
New Democratic	Dave Cooke	21,144	71.03	+13.68
Liberal	Doreen Oullette	6,640	22.31	-15.51
Progressive Conservative	Vivian Tregunna	1,096	3.68	+0.85
Family Coalition	Earl Amyotte	889	2.99	+1.28
Total valid votes		29,769	100.0	

1987 Ontario general election
Party	Candidate	Votes	%	±%
New Democratic	Dave Cooke	17,162	57.65	-3.97
Liberal	Rick Limoges	11,257	37.81	+22.59
Progressive Conservative	Terry Hrynyk	842	2.83	-20.32
Family Coalition	Mark Kahabka	509	1.71	
Total valid votes		29,770	100.0	

1985 Ontario general election
Party	Candidate	Votes	%	±%
New Democratic	Dave Cooke	17,883	61.62	+12.04
Progressive Conservative	Ron Burgoyne	6,719	23.15	+7.08
Liberal	Ferguson Jenkins	4,418	15.22	-17.90
Total valid votes		29,020	100.0	

1981 Ontario general election
Party	Candidate	Votes	%	±%
New Democratic	Dave Cooke	13,626	49.59	+3.99
Liberal	Gerry Levesque	9,102	33.12	-4.11
Progressive Conservative	Sandy Thomson	4,418	16.08	-1.10
Independents	John H. Snyder	333	1.21	
Total valid votes		27,479	100.0	

1977 Ontario general election
Party	Candidate	Votes	%	±%
New Democratic	Dave Cooke	12,947	45.59	-2.26
Liberal	Michael MacDougall	10,572	37.23	-1.68
Progressive Conservative	Al Santing	4,878	17.18	+3.94
Total valid votes		28,397	100.0	

1975 Ontario general election
Party	Candidate	Votes	%	±%
New Democratic	Fred Burr	13,273	47.85	
Liberal	Mike MacDougall	10,793	38.91	
Progressive Conservative	Bill Woolson	3,671	13.24	
Total valid votes		27,737	100.0	

=== Sandwich—Riverside (1967–1975) ===
1971 Ontario general election: Sandwich—Riverside
Party	Candidate	Votes	%	±%
New Democratic	Fred Burr	17,944	50.24	+14.59
Progressive Conservative	Ray Marentette	9,352	26.18	–5.95
Liberal	Len Cecile	8,424	23.58	–8.64
Total valid votes		35,720	99.49	
Total rejected ballots		184	0.51	–0.08
Turnout		35,904	74.86	+9.35
Eligible voters		47,964		
New Democratic hold		Swing		+10.27
Source: Elections Ontario

1967 Ontario general election: Sandwich—Riverside
Party	Candidate	Votes	%
New Democratic	Fred Burr	8,312	35.65
Liberal	Arthur Reaume	7,513	32.22
Progressive Conservative	Louis J. Parent	7,492	32.13
Total valid votes		23,317	99.41
Total rejected ballots		139	0.59
Turnout		23,456	65.50
Eligible voters		35,810	
New Democratic pickup new district.			
Source: Elections Ontario
