= Geoffrey da Silva =

Guyanese politician

Guyanese Minister of Trade, Tourism and Industry
- In office 1999–2001

Guyanese Ambassador to Venezuela
- In office 2011–2015

Geoffrey da Silva is a politician and administrator in Guyana. He was the Guyanese Minister of Trade, Tourism and Industry from 1999 to 2001 and later served as head of Guyana Investment (Go-Invest).

== Activities in Canada ==
Da Silva has a degree from York University in Toronto, Ontario, Canada. He was an employee of the Communist Party of Canada in the 1980s and ran as a Communist candidate at the federal and provincial levels. He also sought election for municipal office in Toronto. The Communist Party was not a strong political force in Canada during this period, and da Silva never came close to winning election.

Da Silva was involved in the Guyanese liberation movement during his time in Canada, seeking the return of democracy in that country. He was Guyana's Consul General to Toronto in the 1990s, and was interviewed by the Toronto Star newspaper following the death of Guyanese president Cheddi Jagan in 1997.

== Cabinet Minister ==
Da Silva was appointed to the cabinet of President Bharrat Jagdeo on 19 November 1999, replacing the ailing Michael Shree Chan as minister of trade, tourism and industry. As a participant in the Fourth Annual Caribbean Tourism Organization (CTO) Conference on Sustainable Tourism Development in 2000, he argued that Caribbean tourism would need to reflect a growing interest in ecotourism. He also promoted sustainable tourism in the ecologically fragile area of Kaieteur and took part in negotiations toward completing a roadway with Brazil. In February 2000, he led an official delegation that met with Prince Charles of the United Kingdom in his official visit to Guyana.

== After 2001 ==
Da Silva left cabinet following the 2001 elections and was appointed as head of Guyana Investment. The following year, the Guyana and Caribbean Political and Cultural Center for Popular Education released an essay arguing that he had significantly improved the agency's ability to attract investors during his time in office.

In 2005, da Silva argued that Guyana was creating jobs by diversifying its economy away from traditional crops such as bauxite and sugar. He helped to organize the Guyana Trade and Investment Exposition in the same year, seeking increased Canadian investment in Guyana. Notwithstanding his leftist political background, da Silva has called for increased private-sector involvement in Guyana's food packaging industry.

In 2011, da Silva was appointed Ambassador to Venezuela He served until 2015.

== Electoral record ==
1988 Canadian federal election: Eglinton—Lawrence
Party	Candidate	Votes	%	±%	Expenditures
Liberal	Joe Volpe	20,446	51.02	+8.04	$33,611
Progressive Conservative	Tony Abbott	12,400	30.94	−9.35	$26,187
New Democratic	Vittoria Levi	6,241	15.57	+0.68	$16,036
Libertarian	Sandor L. Hegedus	538	1.34	+0.51	$0
Communist	Geoffrey da Silva	208	0.52	+0.02	$357
Revolutionary; Workers League	Margaret Manwaring	123	0.31		$776
Commonwealth of Canada	James Felicioni	122	0.30		$67
Total valid votes		40,078	100.00		
Total rejected ballots		565			
Turnout		40,643	74.76		
Electors on the lists		54,362			
