= Tony Grande =

Canadian politician

Ontario MPP
- In office 1975–1987
- Preceded by: New riding
- Succeeded by: Chaviva Hošek
- Constituency: Oakwood

Personal details
- Born: January 11, 1943 Calabria, Italy
- Died: August 9, 2006 (aged 63) Toronto, Ontario
- Party: New Democrat
- Spouse: Helen Schlanger
- Occupation: Teacher

Anthony William Grande (January 11, 1943 – August 9, 2006) was a politician in Ontario, Canada. He served in the Legislative Assembly of Ontario from 1975 to 1987, as a member of the New Democratic Party who represented the Toronto riding of Oakwood.

== Background ==
Grande was born in Calabria, Italy, and moved to Canada with his family at age eleven. He was educated at the University of Toronto, Lakeshore Teachers College and the Ontario Institute for Studies in Education, and worked as a teacher with the Toronto District School Board. Prior to his election, he was teacher liaison chair for the New Democratic Party.

In 1974 he married Helen Schlanger. They had three children: Aaron David (1977), Daniel Robert (1979) and Laura Simone (1983). He died of cancer on August 9, 2006, following a four-year illness.

== Politics ==
Grande was elected to the Ontario legislature in the 1975 provincial election, and re-elected in 1977, 1981 and 1985. He served as NDP education critic in the early 1980s, and was reassigned as critic for citizenship, culture and special issues of education in 1983.

Grande supported Bob Rae's successful campaign for the NDP leadership in 1982, and was subsequently asked to relinquish his seat to allow Rae to run for a position in the legislature. He declined, arguing that the local Italian community in his riding would be upset if he were forced to resign in favour of a non-Italian.

Grande was a strong advocate for multiculturalism and multicultural services during his time. He supported minority language rights in education, and in 1986 he introduced a Private Member's Bill that would have made it easier for students to be taught in languages other than English or French. The bill died on the order paper when a new election was called in 1987. Grande was also an advocate for labour, and successfully represented three workers from a North York, Ontario factory before the Ontario Labour Relations Board in 1979–80. He also supported the rights of tenants, and promoted legislation to permit persons over sixteen years of age to gain access to their medical records.

The Progressive Conservative Party, which had governed Ontario since 1943, was reduced to a minority government in the 1985 election. After the election, the NDP provided outside support to allow the Liberal Party to form a new administration. The Liberal government was still popular in office after two years, and won a landslide majority government in the 1987 election. Grande lost his seat to Liberal star candidate Chaviva Hošek, and worked as a health and safety officer after leaving office.

He campaigned for Mayor of York in 1988, describing the city's government as a "family compact" and promising to fight for an increased share of Metropolitan Toronto's tax base. He lost to moderate Tory candidate Fergy Brown.

== Electoral record ==
1988 Toronto municipal election: Mayor of York
Candidate	Votes	%
Fergy Brown	21,493	58.74
Tony Grande	13,616	37.21
Mario Faraone	1,482	4.05
Total valid votes	36,591	100.00

1987 Ontario general election: Oakwood
Party	Candidate	Votes	%	±%
Liberal	Chaviva Hošek	11,192	48.28	+9.76
New Democratic	Tony Grande	9,861	42.54	+0.91
Progressive Conservative	Irene Paparo-Stein	1,573	6.79	–11.76
Communist	Geoffrey da Silva	556	2.40	+1.09
Total valid votes		23,182	99.11	
Total rejected ballots		209	0.89	–0.04
Turnout		23,391	67.10	–1.32
Eligible voters		34,860		
Liberal gain from New Democratic		Swing		+4.42
Source: Elections Ontario

1985 Ontario general election: Oakwood
Party	Candidate	Votes	%	±%
New Democratic	Tony Grande	10,407	41.63	–3.55
Liberal	Joe Ricciuti	9,631	38.52	+17.26
Progressive Conservative	Harriet Wolman	4,636	18.54	–11.84
Communist	Mike Sterling	327	1.31	–1.87
Total valid votes		25,001	99.06	
Total rejected ballots		236	0.94	–0.27
Turnout		25,237	68.42	+12.41
Eligible voters		36,884		
New Democratic hold		Swing		–10.40
Source: Elections Ontario

1981 Ontario general election: Oakwood
Party	Candidate	Votes	%	±%	Expenditures
New Democratic	Tony Grande	8,862	45.17	+1.69	$12,929
Progressive Conservative	Harriet Wolman	5,961	30.39	+0.28	$24,885
Liberal	Kamala Jean Gopie	4,171	21.26	–2.55	$14,485
Communist	Nancy (Nan) McDonald	624	3.18	+2.10	$1,122
Total valid votes		19,618	98.79		
Total rejected ballots		240	1.21	+0.22	
Turnout		19,858	56.01	–8.79	
Eligible voters		35,453			
New Democratic hold		Swing		+0.70	
Source: Elections Ontario

1977 Ontario general election: Oakwood
Party	Candidate	Votes	%	±%	Expenditures
New Democratic	Tony Grande	9,214	43.48	+4.23	$14,076
Progressive Conservative	Fergy Brown	6,379	30.10	+5.47	$23,388
Liberal	Richard Meagher	5,046	23.81	–7.90	$21,168
Communist	Val Bjarnason	229	1.08	–0.36	$1,920
Independent	Willis Cummins	170	0.80	–	$224
Libertarian	Alex W. Eaglesham	153	0.72	–	$0
Total valid votes		21,191	99.01		
Total rejected ballots		212	0.99	–0.00	
Turnout		21,403	64.80	+5.34	
Eligible voters		33,027			
New Democratic hold		Swing		–0.62	
Source: Elections Ontario

1975 Ontario general election: Oakwood
Party	Candidate	Votes	%
New Democratic	Tony Grande	7,388	39.25
Liberal	Richard Meagher	5,970	31.71
Progressive Conservative	Joseph Marrese	4,637	24.63
Independent	Marvin Gordon	558	2.96
Communist	Val Bjarnason	271	1.44
Total valid votes		18,824	99.01
Total rejected ballots		189	0.99
Turnout		19,013	59.46
Eligible voters		31,975	
New Democratic pickup new district.			
Source: Elections Ontario

All provincial election information is taken from Elections Ontario.
