= Victoria—Haliburton (provincial electoral district) =

Former provincial electoral district in Ontario, Canada

Ontario electoral district

Defunct provincial electoral district
- Legislature: Legislative Assembly of Ontario
- District created: 1934
- District abolished: 1996
- First contested: 1934
- Last contested: 1995

Victoria—Haliburton was a provincial electoral district in central Ontario, Canada, which elected members to the Legislative Assembly of Ontario. It was created in 1967 and abolished in 1999 into Haliburton—Kawartha Lakes—Brock and Parry Sound—Muskoka.

== Boundaries ==
The riding was created in 1934 and consisted of the counties of Victoria and Haliburton. In 1967, the riding was renamed as Victoria-Haliburton and consisted of the counties of Victoria and Haliburton, the town of Lindsay and the villages of Bobcaygeon, Fenelon Falls, Omemee, Sturgeon Point and Woodville, and the Improvement District of Bicroft. In 1975, the boundaries were redefined as only including the counties of Victoria and Haliburton. In 1986, the riding was changed slightly to exclude the township of Manvers.

In 1996, a major electoral riding redistribution occurred which abolished the riding. Overall 130 seats were reduced to 103 which harmonized the provincial riding boundaries with those of the already existing federal ridings. The riding was dissolved into the new ridings of Haliburton—Kawartha Lakes—Brock and Parry Sound—Muskoka.

== Members of Provincial Parliament ==
This riding elected the following members of the Legislative Assembly of Ontario:

Victoria
Assembly	Years	Member	Party
Riding created from Victoria North and Victoria South before 1934 election
19th	1934–1937	William Newman	Liberal
20th	1937–1943	Leslie Frost	Progressive Conservative
21st	1943–1945	Leslie Frost	Progressive Conservative
22nd	1945–1948	Leslie Frost	Progressive Conservative
23rd	1948–1951	Leslie Frost	Progressive Conservative
24th	1951–1955	Leslie Frost	Progressive Conservative
25th	1955–1959	Leslie Frost	Progressive Conservative
26th	1959–1963	Leslie Frost	Progressive Conservative
27th	1963–1967	Glen Hodgson	Progressive Conservative
Victoria—Haliburton
28th	1967–1971	Glen Hodgson	Progressive Conservative
29th	1971–1975	Glen Hodgson	Progressive Conservative
30th	1975–1977	John Eakins	Liberal
31st	1977–1981	John Eakins	Liberal
32nd	1981–1985	John Eakins	Liberal
33rd	1985–1987	John Eakins	Liberal
34th	1987–1990	John Eakins	Liberal
35th	1990–1993	Dennis Drainville	New Democratic
35th	1993–1993	Dennis Drainville	Independent
35th	1994–1995	Chris Hodgson	Progressive Conservative
36th	1995–1999	Chris Hodgson	Progressive Conservative
Sourced from the Ontario Legislative Assembly
Riding dissolved into Haliburton—Kawartha Lakes—Brock and Parry Sound—Muskoka before 1999 election

== See also ==
- List of Ontario provincial electoral districts
- Canadian provincial electoral districts
