= Oakwood (provincial electoral district) =

Former provincial electoral district in Ontario, Canada

Ontario electoral district

Defunct provincial electoral district
- Legislature: Legislative Assembly of Ontario
- District created: 1975
- District abolished: 1997
- First contested: 1975
- Last contested: 1999

Demographics
- Census division: Toronto
- Census subdivision: Toronto

Oakwood was a provincial electoral district in Ontario, Canada. It was created for the 1975 provincial election, and was retained until redistribution in 1999. It was abolished into Davenport, Eglinton—Lawrence, York South—Weston and St. Paul's. Oakwood was located in York, which was previously part of Metropolitan Toronto and is now part of the City of Toronto.

Oakwood was a fairly safe seat for the New Democratic Party for most of its existence, although the Liberals won in 1987 and 1995. Both Liberal MPPs, Chaviva Hošek and Mike Colle, served in the Ontario cabinet at one time or another.

The longest-serving member for Oakwood was Tony Grande, who held the seat from 1975 to 1987. Tony Rizzo, elected in 1990, was forced to sit as an independent MP for twenty months after it was disclosed that his construction firm had been charged with violating Ontario's labour code in 1989. He returned to caucus in 1992.

The riding had large Italian and Portuguese communities, and there was a significant increase in Caribbean immigrants during the 1980s.

== Members of Provincial Parliament ==
Oakwood
Assembly	Years	Member	Party
Created from parts of York South and York-Forest Hill ridings in 1975
30th	1975–1977	Tony Grande	New Democratic
31st	1977–1981	Tony Grande	New Democratic
32nd	1981–1985	Tony Grande	New Democratic
33rd	1985–1987	Tony Grande	New Democratic
34th	1987–1990	Chaviva Hosek	Liberal
35th	1990–1995	Tony Rizzo (Note: Sat as an independent from October 10, 1990 to June 09, 1992.)	New Democratic
36th	1995–1999	Michael Colle	Liberal
Sourced from the Ontario Legislative Assembly
Merged into Davenport, Eglinton—Lawrence, York South—Weston and St. Paul's (1999)

== Electoral results ==
=== 1987 boundaries ===
1995 Ontario general election
Party	Candidate	Votes	%	±%
Liberal	Michael Colle	8,599	42.31	+4.23
New Democratic	Tony Rizzo	7,624	37.51	–11.23
Progressive Conservative	Courtney Doldron	3,298	16.23	+8.41
Independent	Joseph Flexer	301	1.48	–
Green	Constantine Kritsonis	269	1.32	–1.46
Natural Law	Doug Storey	135	0.66	–
Libertarian	Nunzio Venuto	100	0.49	–1.17
Total valid votes		20,326	98.17	
Total rejected, unmarked and declined ballots		378	1.83	+0.06
Turnout		20,704	65.74	–1.95
Eligible voters		31,493		
Liberal gain from New Democratic		Swing		+7.73
Source: Elections Ontario

1990 Ontario general election
Party	Candidate	Votes	%	±%
New Democratic	Tony Rizzo	10,423	48.74	+6.20
Liberal	Chaviva Hošek	8,143	38.08	–10.20
Progressive Conservative	Claudio C. Lewis	1,671	7.81	+1.03
Green	Steven W. Peck	595	2.78	–
Libertarian	John Primerano	355	1.66	–
Communist	Elizabeth Rowley	197	0.92	–1.48
Total valid votes		21,384	98.24	
Total rejected, unmarked and declined ballots		384	1.76	+0.87
Turnout		21,768	67.69	+0.59
Eligible voters		32,160		
New Democratic gain from Liberal		Swing		+8.20
Source: Elections Ontario

1987 Ontario general election
Party	Candidate	Votes	%	±%
Liberal	Chaviva Hošek	11,192	48.28	+9.76
New Democratic	Tony Grande	9,861	42.54	+0.91
Progressive Conservative	Irene Paparo-Stein	1,573	6.79	–11.76
Communist	Geoffrey da Silva	556	2.40	+1.09
Total valid votes		23,182	99.11	
Total rejected ballots		209	0.89	–0.04
Turnout		23,391	67.10	–1.32
Eligible voters		34,860		
Liberal gain from New Democratic		Swing		+4.42
Source: Elections Ontario

=== 1975 boundaries ===
1985 Ontario general election
Party	Candidate	Votes	%	±%
New Democratic	Tony Grande	10,407	41.63	–3.55
Liberal	Joe Ricciuti	9,631	38.52	+17.26
Progressive Conservative	Harriet Wolman	4,636	18.54	–11.84
Communist	Mike Sterling	327	1.31	–1.87
Total valid votes		25,001	99.06	
Total rejected ballots		236	0.94	–0.27
Turnout		25,237	68.42	+12.41
Eligible voters		36,884		
New Democratic hold		Swing		–10.40
Source: Elections Ontario

1981 Ontario general election
Party	Candidate	Votes	%	±%	Expenditures
New Democratic	Tony Grande	8,862	45.17	+1.69	$12,929
Progressive Conservative	Harriet Wolman	5,961	30.39	+0.28	$24,885
Liberal	Kamala Jean Gopie	4,171	21.26	–2.55	$14,485
Communist	Nancy (Nan) McDonald	624	3.18	+2.10	$1,122
Total valid votes		19,618	98.79		
Total rejected ballots		240	1.21	+0.22	
Turnout		19,858	56.01	–8.79	
Eligible voters		35,453			
New Democratic hold		Swing		+0.70	
Source: Elections Ontario

1977 Ontario general election
Party	Candidate	Votes	%	±%	Expenditures
New Democratic	Tony Grande	9,214	43.48	+4.23	$14,076
Progressive Conservative	Fergy Brown	6,379	30.10	+5.47	$23,388
Liberal	Richard Meagher	5,046	23.81	–7.90	$21,168
Communist	Val Bjarnason	229	1.08	–0.36	$1,920
Independent	Willis Cummins	170	0.80	–	$224
Libertarian	Alex W. Eaglesham	153	0.72	–	$0
Total valid votes		21,191	99.01		
Total rejected ballots		212	0.99	–0.00	
Turnout		21,403	64.80	+5.34	
Eligible voters		33,027			
New Democratic hold		Swing		–0.62	
Source: Elections Ontario

1975 Ontario general election
Party	Candidate	Votes	%
New Democratic	Tony Grande	7,388	39.25
Liberal	Richard Meagher	5,970	31.71
Progressive Conservative	Joseph Marrese	4,637	24.63
Independent	Marvin Gordon	558	2.96
Communist	Val Bjarnason	271	1.44
Total valid votes		18,824	99.01
Total rejected ballots		189	0.99
Turnout		19,013	59.46
Eligible voters		31,975	
New Democratic pickup new district.			
Source: Elections Ontario

== See also ==
- List of Ontario provincial electoral districts
- Canadian provincial electoral districts
