= 35th Parliament of Ontario =

Parliamentary session of the Ontario Provincial Parliament

- Majority parliament
- Sep. 6, 1990 – Apr. 28, 1995

Parliament leaders
- Premier: Bob Rae
- Leader of the Opposition: Robert Nixon; 1990–1991
- Murray Elston; 1991
- Jim Bradley; 1991–1992
- Lyn McLeod

Party caucuses
- Government: New Democratic Party
- Opposition: Liberal Party
- Recognized: Progressive Conservative Party

Legislative Assembly
- Speaker of the Assembly: David William Warner

Sovereign
- Monarch: Elizabeth II; 6 February 1952 – present
← 34th	→ 36th

The 35th Legislative Assembly of Ontario was in session from September 6, 1990, until April 28, 1995, just prior to the 1995 general election. The majority party was the Ontario New Democratic Party led by Bob Rae.

David William Warner served as speaker for the assembly.

== Issues ==
In 1993, Rae's government introduced legislation known as the Social Contract which was intended to reduce expenditures on salaries paid to members of the provincial civil service without layoffs.

In 1994, the government introduced the Equality Rights Statute Amendment Act (Bill 167), intended to extend civil union rights to same-sex couples. The bill was defeated on a free vote of 68–59 on June 9, 1994.

=== Seating plan ===
▀	▀	▀	▀	▀	▀	▀	▀	▀	▀	▀	▀	▀	▀
▀	▀	*	*	▀	▀	▀	▀	▀	▀	▀	▀	▀	▀	▀	▀	▀	▀	▀	▀	▀	▀	▀
▀	▀	*	*	▀	▀	▀	▀	▀	▀	▀	▀	▀	▀	▀	▀	▀	▀	▀	▀	▀	▀	▀	▀
▀	▀	*	*	*	▀	▀	▀	▀	▀	▀	▀	▀	▀	▀	▀	▀	▀	▀	▀	▀	▀	▀	▀
▀
▀	▀	*	*	*	*	▀	▀	▀	▀	▀	▀	▀	▀	▀	▀	▀	▀	▀	▀	▀	▀	▀	▀	▀	▀
▀	▀	▀	▀	▀	*	▀	▀	▀	▀	▀	▀	▀	▀	▀	▀	▀	▀	▀	▀	▀	▀	▀	▀	▀	▀
▀	▀	▀	▀	▀	*	▀	▀	▀	▀	▀	▀	▀	▀	▀	▀	▀	▀	▀	▀	▀	▀	▀	▀	▀	▀
▀	▀	▀	▀	▀	*	▀	▀	▀	▀	▀	▀	▀	▀	▀	▀	▀	▀	▀	▀	▀	▀	▀	▀	▀

== Members ==
Riding	Member	Party	First elected / previously elected	No. of terms	Notes
Algoma	Bud Wildman	New Democratic Party	1975	6th term	
Algoma—Manitoulin	Mike Brown	Liberal	1987	2nd term	
Beaches—Woodbine	Frances Lankin	New Democratic Party	1990	1st term	
Brampton North	Carman McClelland	Liberal	1987	2nd term	
Brampton South	Bob Callahan	Liberal	1985	3rd term	
Brant—Haldimand	Robert Nixon	Liberal	1962	10th term	Resigned to accept federal appointment
Brant—Haldimand	Ronald Eddy (1992)	Liberal	1992	1st term	Elected in 1992 by-election.
Brantford	Brad Ward	New Democratic Party	1990	1st term	
Bruce	Murray Elston	Liberal	1981	4th term	
Burlington South	Cam Jackson	Progressive Conservative	1985	3rd term	
Cambridge	Mike Farnan	New Democratic Party	1987	2nd term	
Carleton	Norm Sterling	Progressive Conservative	1977	5th term	
Carleton East	Gilles Morin	Liberal	1985	3rd term	
Chatham—Kent	Randy Hope	New Democratic Party	1990	1st term	
Cochrane North	Len Wood	New Democratic Party	1990	1st term	
Cochrane South	Gilles Bisson	New Democratic Party	1990	1st term	
Cornwall	John Cleary	Liberal	1987	2nd term	
Don Mills	Margery Ward	New Democratic Party	1990	1st term	Died in 1993
Don Mills	David Johnson (1993)	Progressive Conservative	1993	1st term	Elected in 1993 by-election.
Dovercourt	Tony Silipo	New Democratic Party	1990	1st term	
Downsview	Anthony Perruzza	New Democratic Party	1990	1st term	
Dufferin—Peel	David Tilson	Progressive Conservative	1990	1st term	
Durham Centre	Drummond White	New Democratic Party	1990	1st term	
Durham East	Gord Mills	New Democratic Party	1990	1st term	
Durham West	Jim Wiseman	New Democratic Party	1990	1st term	
Durham—York	Larry O'Connor	New Democratic Party	1990	1st term	
Eglinton	Dianne Poole	Liberal	1987	2nd term	
Elgin	Peter North	New Democratic Party	1990	1st term	Independent after August 1993.
Elgin	Peter North	Independent	1990	1st term	Independent after August 1993.
Essex South	Remo Mancini	Liberal	1975	6th term	Retired
Essex South	Bruce Crozier (1993)	Liberal	1993	1st term	Elected in 1993 by-election.
Essex—Kent	Patrick Hayes	New Democratic Party	1985, 1990	2nd term*	
Etobicoke West	Chris Stockwell	Progressive Conservative	1990	1st term	
Etobicoke—Humber	Jim Henderson	Liberal	1985	3rd term	
Etobicoke—Lakeshore	Ruth Grier	New Democratic Party	1985	3rd term	
Etobicoke—Rexdale	Ed Philip	New Democratic Party	1975	6th term	
Fort William	Lyn McLeod	Liberal	1987	2nd term	Became party leader in 1992.
Fort York	Rosario Marchese	New Democratic Party	1990	1st term	
Frontenac—Addington	Fred Wilson	New Democratic Party	1990	1st term	
Grey	Bill Murdoch	Progressive Conservative	1990	1st term	
Guelph	Derek Fletcher	New Democratic Party	1990	1st term	
Halton Centre	Barbara Sullivan	Liberal	1987	2nd term	
Halton North	Noel Duignan	New Democratic Party	1990	1st term	
Hamilton Centre	David Christopherson	New Democratic Party	1990	1st term	
Hamilton East	Bob Mackenzie	New Democratic Party	1975	6th term	
Hamilton Mountain	Brian Charlton	New Democratic Party	1977	5th term	
Hamilton West	Richard Allen	New Democratic Party	1982	4th term	
Hastings—Peterborough	Elmer Buchanan	New Democratic Party	1990	1st term	
High Park—Swansea	Elaine Ziemba	New Democratic Party	1990	1st term	
Huron	Paul Klopp	New Democratic Party	1990	1st term	
Kenora	Frank Miclash	Liberal	1987	2nd term	
Kingston and the Islands	Gary Wilson	New Democratic Party	1990	1st term	
Kitchener	Will Ferguson	New Democratic Party	1990	1st term	
Kitchener	Will Ferguson	Independent	1990	1st term	
Kitchener	Will Ferguson	New Democratic Party	1990	1st term	
Kitchener—Wilmot	Mike Cooper	New Democratic Party	1990	1st term	
Lake Nipigon	Gilles Pouliot	New Democratic Party	1985	3rd term	
Lambton	Ellen MacKinnon	New Democratic Party	1990	1st term	
Lanark—Renfrew	Leo Jordan	Progressive Conservative	1990	1st term	
Lawrence	Joseph Cordiano	Liberal	1985	3rd term	
Leeds—Grenville	Bob Runciman	Progressive Conservative	1981	4th term	
Lincoln	Ron Hansen	New Democratic Party	1990	1st term	
London Centre	Marion Boyd	New Democratic Party	1990	1st term	
London North	Dianne Cunningham	Progressive Conservative	1988	2nd term	
London South	David Winninger	New Democratic Party	1990	1st term	
Markham	Don Cousens	Progressive Conservative	1981	4th term	
Middlesex	Irene Mathyssen	New Democratic Party	1990	1st term	
Mississauga East	John Sola	Liberal	1987	2nd term	Independent after May 11, 1993.
Mississauga East	John Sola	Independent	1987	2nd term	Independent after May 11, 1993.
Mississauga North	Steven Offer	Liberal	1985	3rd term	
Mississauga South	Margaret Marland	Progressive Conservative	1985	3rd term	
Mississauga West	Steve Mahoney	Liberal	1987	2nd term	
Muskoka—Georgian Bay	Dan Waters	New Democratic Party	1990	1st term	
Nepean	Hans Daigeler	Liberal	1987	2nd term	
Niagara Falls	Margaret Harrington	New Democratic Party	1990	1st term	
Niagara South	Shirley Coppen	New Democratic Party	1990	1st term	
Nickel Belt	Floyd Laughren	New Democratic Party	1971	7th term	
Nipissing	Mike Harris	Progressive Conservative	1981	4th term	Party leader.
Norfolk	Norman Jamison	New Democratic Party	1990	1st term	
Northumberland	Joan Fawcett	Liberal	1987	2nd term	
Oakville South	Gary Carr	Progressive Conservative	1990	1st term	
Oakwood	Tony Rizzo	New Democratic Party	1990	1st term	Independent from October 10, 1990, to June 9, 1992, due to controversy; then rejoined NDP caucus.
Oakwood	Tony Rizzo	Independent	1990	1st term	Independent from October 10, 1990, to June 9, 1992, due to controversy; then rejoined NDP caucus.
Oakwood	Tony Rizzo	New Democratic Party	1990	1st term	Independent from October 10, 1990, to June 9, 1992, due to controversy; then rejoined NDP caucus.
Oriole	Elinor Caplan	Liberal	1985	3rd term	
Oshawa	Allan Pilkey	New Democratic Party	1990	1st term	
Ottawa Centre	Evelyn Gigantes	New Democratic Party	1975, (Note: Carleton East) 1984, 1990	5th term*	
Ottawa East	Bernard Grandmaître	Liberal	1984	4th term	
Ottawa South	Dalton McGuinty	Liberal	1990	1st term	
Ottawa West	Bob Chiarelli	Liberal	1987	2nd term	
Ottawa—Rideau	Yvonne O'Neill	Liberal	1987	2nd term	
Oxford	Kimble Sutherland	New Democratic Party	1990	1st term	
Parkdale	Tony Ruprecht	Liberal	1981	4th term	
Parry Sound	Ernie Eves	Progressive Conservative	1981	4th term	
Perth	Karen Haslam	New Democratic Party	1990	1st term	
Peterborough	Jenny Carter	New Democratic Party	1990	1st term	
Port Arthur	Shelley Wark-Martyn	New Democratic Party	1990	1st term	
Prescott and Russell	Jean Poirier	Liberal	1984	4th term	
Prince Edward—Lennox—South—Hastings	Paul Johnson	New Democratic Party	1990	1st term	
Quinte	Hugh O'Neil	Liberal	1975	6th term	
Rainy River	Howard Hampton	New Democratic Party	1987	2nd term	
Renfrew North	Sean Conway	Liberal	1975	6th term	
Riverdale	Marilyn Churley	New Democratic Party	1990	1st term	
Sarnia	Bob Huget	New Democratic Party	1990	1st term	
Sault Ste. Marie	Tony Martin	New Democratic Party	1990	1st term	
Scarborough Centre	Steve Owens	New Democratic Party	1990	1st term	
Scarborough East	Bob Frankford	New Democratic Party	1990	1st term	
Scarborough North	Alvin Curling	Liberal	1985	3rd term	
Scarborough West	Anne Swarbrick	New Democratic Party	1990	1st term	
Scarborough—Agincourt	Gerry Phillips	Liberal	1987	2nd term	
Scarborough—Ellesmere	David Warner	New Democratic Party	1975, 1985, 1990	4th term*	
Simcoe Centre	Paul Wessenger	New Democratic Party	1990	1st term	
Simcoe East	Al McLean	Progressive Conservative	1981	4th term	
Simcoe West	Jim Wilson	Progressive Conservative	1990	1st term	
St. Andrew—St. Patrick	Zanana Akande	New Democratic Party	1990	1st term	Resigned in 1994.
St. Catharines	Jim Bradley	Liberal	1977	5th term	
St. Catharines—Brock	Christel Haeck	New Democratic Party	1990	1st term	
St. George—St. David	Ian Scott	Liberal	1985	3rd term	Resigned in 1992.
St. George—St. David	Tim Murphy (1993)	Liberal	1993	1st term	Elected in 1993 by-election.
Stormont—Dundas and Glengarry	Noble Villeneuve	Progressive Conservative	1983	4th term	
Sudbury	Sharon Murdock	New Democratic Party	1990	1st term	
Sudbury East	Shelley Martel	New Democratic Party	1987	2nd term	
Timiskaming	David Ramsay	Liberal (Note: First elected as a New Democrat)	1985	3rd term	
Victoria—Haliburton	Dennis Drainville	New Democratic Party	1990	1st term	Resigned in 1993.
Victoria—Haliburton	Dennis Drainville	Independent	1990	1st term	Resigned in 1993.
Victoria—Haliburton	Chris Hodgson (1994)	Progressive Conservative	1994	1st term	Elected in 1994 by-election.
Waterloo North	Elizabeth Witmer	Progressive Conservative	1990	1st term	
Welland—Thorold	Peter Kormos	New Democratic Party	1988	2nd term	
Wellington	Ted Arnott	Progressive Conservative	1990	1st term	
Wentworth East	Mark Morrow	New Democratic Party	1990	1st term	
Wentworth North	Donald Abel	New Democratic Party	1990	1st term	
Willowdale	Charles Harnick	Progressive Conservative	1990	1st term	
Wilson Heights	Monte Kwinter	Liberal	1985	3rd term	
Windsor—Riverside	Dave Cooke	New Democratic Party	1977	5th term	
Windsor—Sandwich	George Dadamo	New Democratic Party	1990	1st term	
Windsor—Walkerville	Wayne Lessard	New Democratic Party	1990	1st term	
York Centre	Greg Sorbara	Liberal	1985	3rd term	
York East	Gary Malkowski	New Democratic Party	1990	1st term	
York Mills	David Turnbull	Progressive Conservative	1990	1st term	
York North	Charles Beer	Liberal	1987	2nd term	
York South	Bob Rae	New Democratic Party	1982	4th term	Party leader and premier.
Yorkview	George Mammoliti	New Democratic Party	1990	1st term	

== See also ==
- Members in Parliament 35
