= 36th Parliament of Ontario =

Parliamentary session of the Ontario Provincial Parliament

- Majority parliament
- Jun. 8, 1995 – May. 5, 1999

Parliament leaders
- Premier: Mike Harris
- Leader of the Opposition: Lyn McLeod; 1995–1996
- Dalton McGuinty

Party caucuses
- Government: Progressive Conservative Party
- Opposition: Liberal Party
- Recognized: New Democratic Party

Legislative Assembly
- Speaker of the Assembly: Al McLean
- Ed Doyle
- Chris Stockwell

Sovereign
- Monarch: Elizabeth II; 6 February 1952 – present
← 35th	→ 37th

The 36th Legislative Assembly of Ontario, Canada's most-populous province, was in session from June 8, 1995, until May 5, 1999, just prior to the Ontario general election. Majority was held by the Progressive Conservative Party of Ontario led by Mike Harris.

Allan K. McLean served as speaker for the assembly until September 26, 1996. Edward A. Doyle replaced McLean as speaker until October 3, 1996. Christopher M. Stockwell succeeded Doyle as speaker.

▀	▀	*	▀	▀	▀	▀	▀	▀	▀	▀	▀	▀	▀	▀	▀	▀	▀	▀	▀	▀	▀	▀	▀	▀
▀	▀	*	▀	▀	▀	▀	▀	▀	▀	▀	▀	▀	▀	▀	▀	▀	▀	▀	▀	▀	▀	▀	▀	▀
▀	▀	*	▀	▀	▀	▀	▀	▀	▀	▀	▀	▀	▀	▀	▀	▀	▀	▀	▀	▀	▀	▀	▀	▀
▀	▀	*	*	*	▀	▀	▀	▀	▀	▀	▀	▀	▀	▀	▀	▀	▀	▀	▀	▀	▀	▀	▀	▀
▀
▀	*	*	*	*	▀	▀	▀	▀	▀	▀	▀	▀	▀	▀	▀	▀	▀	▀	▀	▀	▀	▀	▀	▀
▀	▀	▀	▀	*	▀	▀	▀	▀	▀	▀	▀	▀	▀	▀	▀	▀	▀	▀	▀	▀	▀	▀	▀	▀
▀	▀	▀	▀	*	▀	▀	▀	▀	▀	▀	▀	▀	▀	▀	▀	▀	▀	▀	▀	▀	▀	▀	▀	▀
▀	▀	▀	▀	*	▀	▀	▀	▀	▀	▀	▀	▀	▀	▀	▀	▀	▀	▀	▀	▀	▀	▀	▀

== Members of Provincial Parliament ==
Riding	Member	Party	First elected / previously elected	No. of terms	Notes
Algoma	Bud Wildman	New Democratic Party	1975	7th term	
Algoma—Manitoulin	Mike Brown	Liberal	1987	3rd term	
Beaches—Woodbine	Frances Lankin	New Democratic Party	1990	2nd term	
Brampton North	Joe Spina	Progressive Conservative	1995	1st term	
Brampton South	Tony Clement	Progressive Conservative	1995	1st term	Minister of Transportation, 1997-1999
Brant—Haldimand	Peter L. Preston	Progressive Conservative	1995	1st term	
Brantford	Ron Johnson	Progressive Conservative	1995	1st term	
Bruce	Barb Fisher	Progressive Conservative	1995	1st term	
Burlington South	Cam Jackson	Progressive Conservative	1985	4th term	
Cambridge	Gerry Martiniuk	Progressive Conservative	1995	1st term	
Carleton	Norm Sterling	Progressive Conservative	1977	6th term	
Carleton East	Gilles Morin	Liberal	1985	4th term	
Chatham—Kent	Jack Carroll	Progressive Conservative	1995	1st term	
Cochrane North	Len Wood	New Democratic Party	1990	2nd term	
Cochrane South	Gilles Bisson	New Democratic Party	1990	2nd term	
Cornwall	John Cleary	Liberal	1987	3rd term	
Don Mills	David Johnson	Progressive Conservative	1993	2nd term	
Dovercourt	Tony Silipo	New Democratic Party	1990	2nd term	
Downsview	Annamarie Castrilli	Liberal	1995	1st term	
Downsview	Annamarie Castrilli	Progressive Conservative	1995	1st term	
Dufferin—Peel	David Tilson	Progressive Conservative	1990	2nd term	
Durham Centre	Jim Flaherty	Progressive Conservative	1995	1st term	Minister of Labour, 1997-1999
Durham East	John O'Toole	Progressive Conservative	1995	1st term	
Durham West	Janet Ecker	Progressive Conservative	1995	1st term	Minister of Community and Social Services, 1996-1999
Durham—York	Julia Munro	Progressive Conservative	1995	1st term	
Eglinton	Bill Saunderson	Progressive Conservative	1995	1st term	Minister of Economic Development, Trade and Tourism, 1995-1997
Elgin	Peter North	Independent (Note: First elected as a New Democrat)	1990	2nd term	
Essex South	Bruce Crozier	Liberal	1993	2nd term	
Essex—Kent	Pat Hoy	Liberal	1995	1st term	
Etobicoke West	Chris Stockwell	Progressive Conservative	1990	2nd term	Speaker of the Legislature, 1996-1999
Etobicoke—Humber	Doug Ford Sr.	Progressive Conservative	1995	1st term	
Etobicoke—Lakeshore	Morley Kells	Progressive Conservative	1981, 1995	2nd term*	
Etobicoke—Rexdale	John Hastings	Progressive Conservative	1995	1st term	
Fort William	Lyn McLeod	Liberal	1987	3rd term	Party Leader, 1995-1996 (Resigned Leadership)
Fort York	Rosario Marchese	New Democratic Party	1990	2nd term	
Frontenac—Addington	Bill Vankoughnet	Progressive Conservative	1995	1st term	
Frontenac—Addington	Bill Vankoughnet	Independent	1995	1st term	
Frontenac—Addington	Bill Vankoughnet	Progressive Conservative	1995	1st term	
Grey—Owen Sound	Bill Murdoch	Progressive Conservative	1990	2nd term	
Guelph	Brenda Elliott	Progressive Conservative	1995	1st term	Minister of Environment and Energy, 1995-1996
Halton Centre	Terence Young	Progressive Conservative	1995	1st term	
Halton North	Ted Chudleigh	Progressive Conservative	1995	1st term	
Hamilton Centre	David Christopherson	New Democratic Party	1990	2nd term	
Hamilton East	Dominic Agostino	Liberal	1995	1st term	
Hamilton Mountain	Trevor Pettit	Progressive Conservative	1995	1st term	
Hamilton West	Lillian Ross	Progressive Conservative	1995	1st term	
Hastings—Peterborough	Harry Danford	Progressive Conservative	1995	1st term	
High Park—Swansea	Derwyn Shea	Progressive Conservative	1995	1st term	
Huron	Helen Johns	Progressive Conservative	1995	1st term	
Kenora	Frank Miclash	Liberal	1987	3rd term	
Kingston and the Islands	John Gerretsen	Liberal	1995	1st term	
Kitchener	Wayne Wettlaufer	Progressive Conservative	1995	1st term	
Kitchener—Wilmot	Gary Leadston	Progressive Conservative	1995	1st term	
Lake Nipigon	Gilles Pouliot	New Democratic Party	1985	4th term	
Lambton	Marcel Beaubien	Progressive Conservative	1995	1st term	
Lanark—Renfrew	Leo Jordan	Progressive Conservative	1990	2nd term	
Lawrence	Joseph Cordiano	Liberal	1985	4th term	
Leeds—Grenville	Bob Runciman	Progressive Conservative	1981	5th term	Solicitor General and Minister of Correctional Services, 1995-1999
Lincoln	Frank Sheehan	Progressive Conservative	1995	1st term	
London Centre	Marion Boyd	New Democratic Party	1990	2nd term	
London North	Dianne Cunningham	Progressive Conservative	1988	3rd term	Minister of Intergovernmental Affairs and Minister Responsible for Women's Issues, 1995-1999
London South	Bob Wood	Progressive Conservative	1995	1st term	
Markham	David Tsubouchi	Progressive Conservative	1995	1st term	Minister of Community and Social Services, 1995-1996; Minister of Consumer and Commercial Relations, 1996-1999
Middlesex	Bruce Smith	Progressive Conservative	1995	1st term	
Mississauga East	Carl DeFaria	Progressive Conservative	1995	1st term	
Mississauga North	John Snobelen	Progressive Conservative	1995	1st term	Minister of Education, 1995-1997; Minister of Natural Resources, 1997-1999
Mississauga South	Margaret Marland	Progressive Conservative	1985	4th term	Minister without Portfolio (Children), 1997-1999
Mississauga West	Rob Sampson	Progressive Conservative	1995	1st term	Minister without Portfolio (Privatization), 1996-1999
Muskoka—Georgian Bay	Bill Grimmett	Progressive Conservative	1995	1st term	
Nepean	John Baird	Progressive Conservative	1995	1st term	
Niagara Falls	Bart Maves	Progressive Conservative	1995	1st term	
Niagara South	Tim Hudak	Progressive Conservative	1995	1st term	
Nickel Belt	Floyd Laughren	New Democratic Party	1971	8th term	Resigned, 1998
Nickel Belt	Blain Morin (1998)	New Democratic Party	1998	1st term	Elected in by-election, 1998
Nipissing	Mike Harris	Progressive Conservative	1981	5th term	Premier and Party Leader
Norfolk	Toby Barrett	Progressive Conservative	1995	1st term	
Northumberland	Doug Galt	Progressive Conservative	1995	1st term	
Oakville South	Gary Carr	Progressive Conservative	1990	2nd term	
Oakwood	Mike Colle	Liberal	1995	1st term	
Oriole	Elinor Caplan (Note: elected to federal seat)	Liberal	1985	4th term	Resigned, 1997
Oriole	David Caplan (1997)	Liberal	1997	1st term	Elected in by-election, 1997
Oshawa	Jerry Ouellette	Progressive Conservative	1995	1st term	
Ottawa Centre	Richard Patten	Liberal	1987, 1995	2nd term*	
Ottawa East	Bernard Grandmaître	Liberal	1984	5th term	
Ottawa South	Dalton McGuinty	Liberal	1990	2nd term	Party Leader, 1996-2013
Ottawa West	Bob Chiarelli (Note: resigned seat)	Liberal	1987	3rd term	Resigned, 1997
Ottawa West	Alex Cullen (1997)	Liberal (Note: later NDP, then Independent)	1997	1st term	Elected in by-election, 1997
Ottawa West	Alex Cullen (1997)	Independent	1997	1st term	Elected in by-election, 1997
Ottawa West	Alex Cullen (1997)	New Democratic Party	1997	1st term	Elected in by-election, 1997
Ottawa—Rideau	Garry Guzzo	Progressive Conservative	1995	1st term	
Oxford	Ernie Hardeman	Progressive Conservative	1995	1st term	
Parkdale	Tony Ruprecht	Liberal	1981	5th term	
Parry Sound	Ernie Eves	Progressive Conservative	1981	5th term	Deputy Premier and Minister of Finance, 1995-1999
Perth	Bert Johnson	Progressive Conservative	1995	1st term	Deputy Speaker of the Legislature, 1995-1999
Peterborough	Gary Stewart	Progressive Conservative	1995	1st term	
Port Arthur	Michael Gravelle	Liberal	1995	1st term	
Prescott and Russell	Jean-Marc Lalonde	Liberal	1995	1st term	
Prince Edward—Lennox-South—Hastings	Gary Fox	Progressive Conservative	1995	1st term	
Quinte	Doug Rollins	Progressive Conservative	1995	1st term	
Rainy River	Howard Hampton	New Democratic Party	1987	3rd term	Party Leader, 1996-2009
Renfrew North	Sean Conway	Liberal	1975	7th term	
Riverdale	Marilyn Churley	New Democratic Party	1990	2nd term	
Sarnia	Dave Boushy	Progressive Conservative	1995	1st term	
Sault Ste. Marie	Tony Martin	New Democratic Party	1990	2nd term	
Scarborough Centre	Dan Newman	Progressive Conservative	1995	1st term	
Scarborough East	Steve Gilchrist	Progressive Conservative	1995	1st term	
Scarborough North	Alvin Curling	Liberal	1985	4th term	
Scarborough West	Jim Brown	Progressive Conservative	1995	1st term	
Scarborough—Agincourt	Gerry Phillips	Liberal	1987	3rd term	
Scarborough—Ellesmere	Marilyn Mushinski	Progressive Conservative	1995	1st term	Minister of Citizenship, Culture and Recreation, 1995-1997
Simcoe Centre	Joe Tascona	Progressive Conservative	1995	1st term	
Simcoe East	Al McLean	Progressive Conservative	1981	5th term	Speaker of the Legislature, 1995-1996 (Resigned Speakership)
Simcoe West	Jim Wilson	Progressive Conservative	1990	2nd term	Minister of Health, 1995-1997; Minister of Energy, Science and Technology, 1997-1999
St. Andrew—St. Patrick	Isabel Bassett	Progressive Conservative	1995	1st term	Minister of Citizenship, Culture and Recreation, 1997-1999
St. Catharines	Jim Bradley	Liberal	1977	6th term	
St. Catharines—Brock	Tom Froese	Progressive Conservative	1995	1st term	
St. George—St. David	Al Leach	Progressive Conservative	1995	1st term	Minister of Municipal Affairs and Housing, 1995-1999
Stormont—Dundas—Glengarry and East Grenville	Noble Villeneuve	Progressive Conservative	1983	5th term	Minister of Agriculture and Food, 1995-1999
Sudbury	Rick Bartolucci	Liberal	1995	1st term	
Sudbury East	Shelley Martel	New Democratic Party	1987	3rd term	
Timiskaming	David Ramsay	Liberal	1985	4th term	
Victoria—Haliburton	Chris Hodgson	Progressive Conservative	1994	2nd term	Minister of Natural Resources and Minister of Northern Development and Mines, 1995-1999
Waterloo North	Elizabeth Witmer	Progressive Conservative	1990	2nd term	Minister of Labour, 1995-1997; Minister of Health, 1997-1999
Welland—Thorold	Peter Kormos	New Democratic Party	1988	3rd term	
Wellington	Ted Arnott	Progressive Conservative	1990	2nd term	
Wentworth East	Ed Doyle	Progressive Conservative	1995	1st term	
Wentworth North	Toni Skarica	Progressive Conservative	1995	1st term	
Willowdale	Charles Harnick	Progressive Conservative	1990	2nd term	Attorney General and Minister Responsible for Native Affairs, 1995-1999
Wilson Heights	Monte Kwinter	Liberal	1985	4th term	
Windsor—Riverside	Dave Cooke	New Democratic Party	1977	6th term	Resigned, 1997
Windsor—Riverside	Wayne Lessard (1997)	New Democratic Party	1990, (Note: Windsor—Walkerville) 1997	2nd term*	Elected in by-election, 1997
Windsor—Sandwich	Sandra Pupatello	Liberal	1995	1st term	
Windsor—Walkerville	Dwight Duncan	Liberal	1995	1st term	
York Centre	Al Palladini	Progressive Conservative	1995	1st term	Minister of Transportation, 1995-1997; Minister of Economic Development, Trade and Tourism, 1997-1999
York East	John Parker	Progressive Conservative	1995	1st term	
York Mills	David Turnbull	Progressive Conservative	1990	2nd term	Chief Government Whip, 1995-1999
York South	Bob Rae	New Democratic Party	1982	5th term	Party Leader, 1995-1996 (Resigned Leadership and Seat)
York South	Gerard Kennedy (1996)	Liberal	1996	1st term	Elected in by-election, 1996
York—Mackenzie	Frank Klees	Progressive Conservative	1995	1st term	
Yorkview	Mario Sergio	Liberal	1995	1st term	

== See also ==
- Members in Parliament 36
