= Speaker of the Legislative Assembly of Ontario =

Canadian provincial legislative officer

- Président de l'Assemblée législative de l'Ontario
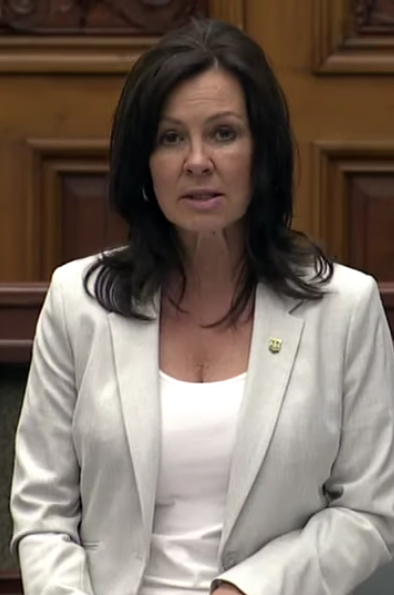
- Incumbent; Donna Skelly since April 14, 2025
- Legislative Assembly of Ontario
- Member of: Provincial Parliament
- Seat: Queen's Park, Toronto
- Formation: December 27, 1867
- First holder: John Stevenson
- Salary: $208,443 (2025)

The Speaker of the Legislative Assembly of Ontario (French: Président de l'Assemblée législative de l'Ontario) is the presiding officer of the Legislative Assembly of Ontario.

== Notable elections ==
=== 1920 ===
Nelson Parliament was a Liberal representing Prince Edward riding, who was named Speaker when the United Farmers of Ontario and Labour Party formed a coalition government in the 15th Legislative Assembly of Ontario. A considerable number of members in the governing party were either freshly elected or chosen to serve as government ministers (which made them ineligible to be Speaker). As a result, the Premier, E.C. Drury, looked to the opposition benches for a Speaker, and chose Parliament, who had served as an MPP since 1914. Upon becoming Speaker, Parliament resigned from the Liberal caucus and sat without party affiliation, as a compromise for his election. While this is the normal practice in the British House of Commons, it is the only time it has happened in Ontario.

=== 1977 ===
Jack Stokes was the NDP MPP for Lake Nipigon, and was named Speaker by Progressive Conservative Premier Bill Davis. His election is an example of an instance where a member of an opposing party was elected to the position. Davis was elected to lead a minority government and having an opposition MPP as Speaker was a means of denying the opposition one vote (as the Speaker only votes in the occasion of a tie and then must vote by precedent).

=== 1985 ===
Liberal Party MPP Hugh Edighoffer (Perth) was named Speaker following the 1985 provincial election that returned a slim minority Progressive Conservative government under Frank Miller. The opposition Liberals and NDP together controlled a majority of seats and so Miller nominated Edighoffer as Speaker, with Liberal leader David Peterson seconding the nomination, and Edighoffer was acclaimed. Days later, the Miller government was brought down by a Motion of Non-Confidence and, as a result of an accord between the Liberals and the NDP, Liberal leader David Peterson was asked to form a government without the legislature being dissolved and a new election. Edighoffer, a Liberal MPP, remained Speaker for the duration of the Peterson government as well.

=== 1990 ===
NDP MPP David William Warner (Scarborough-Ellesmere) was elected Speaker on the second ballot, in the first election held for the position by secret ballot, as the result of a reform introduced by the newly-elected Ontario New Democratic Party government of Bob Rae. Warner won over Liberals Jean Poirier (Prescott and Russell) and Gilles Morin (Carleton East) and PC MPP Norm Sterling (Carleton).

=== 1996 ===
On the seventh ballot, PC MPP Chris Stockwell (Etobicoke West) was elected Speaker, defeating fellow PC MPP Margaret Marland (Mississauga South), who was the preferred choice of Premier Mike Harris. Candidates eliminated in the previous six ballots were PC MPPs David Tilson (Dufferin-Peel) Jack Carroll (Chatham-Kent), Gary Leadston (Kitchener-Wilmot), and Derwyn Shea (High Park—Swansea), NDP MPP Floyd Laughren (Nickel Belt) and Liberal Gilles Morin (Carleton East).

=== 2011 ===
There were nine candidates for the position of Speaker in the 40th Ontario legislature, held after the 2011 provincial election returned a minority Liberal government. The Liberal candidates were Donna Cansfield, who was supported by Premier Dalton McGuinty, Kevin Flynn, Dave Levac and David Zimmer. A fifth candidate, Progressive Conservative MPP Frank Klees withdrew after his bid failed to receive sufficient support from either side of the aisle.

David Zimmer dropped off after the first ballot. On the second ballot, Dave Levac was elected Speaker. The actual vote totals were not released.

=== 2014 ===
Liberal MPP Dave Levac was re-elected to a second term as Speaker at the first session of the 41st Parliament held on July 2, 2014, becoming the first Speaker since Hugh Edighoffer to serve more than one term. Levac defeated NDP MPP Paul Miller and Progressive Conservative Rick Nicholls on the third ballot. NDP MPP Cheri DiNovo was eliminated on the first ballot and Liberal MPP Shafiq Qaadri was eliminated on the second ballot. Actual vote totals were not released.

=== 2018 ===
PC MPP Ted Arnott was elected as Speaker at the first session of the 42nd Parliament held on July 11, 2018 on the first ballot, defeating Randy Hillier, Jane McKenna and Rick Nicholls. Arnott was one of the three longest serving members of the legislature at the time of election.

=== 2022 ===
Arnott was re-elected Speaker on August 8, 2022, defeating a challenge by fellow PC MPP Nina Tangri, who had been endorsed by Premier Doug Ford.

=== 2025 ===
Donna Skelly was elected Speaker on April 14, 2025, defeating Jennifer French. Skelly is the first woman to serve as Speaker of the legislature.

== Election ==
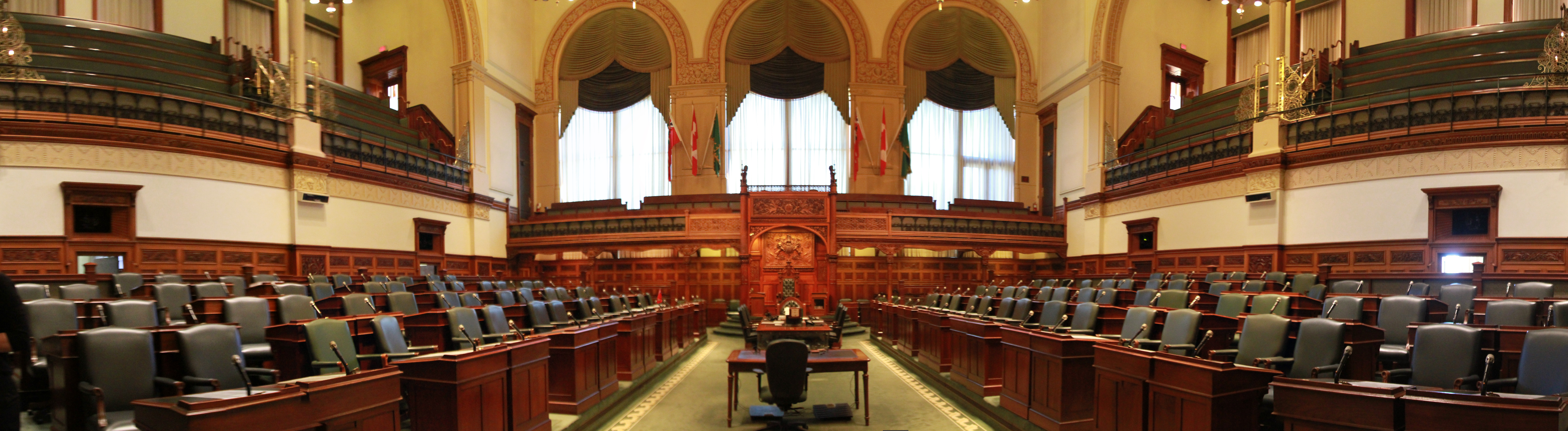
Chamber of the Legislative Assembly of Ontario. Speaker's dais is in direct centre of image in the front of the chamber.

As with other Speakers that are modeled on the Westminster system, the Speaker of the Legislative Assembly is elected using a secret ballot. Since 1990, the position has been elected by MPPs in this manner. Previously, the Speaker had been appointed directly by the Premier of Ontario after consultation with the Leader of the Opposition and the leader of the third-largest party, and then ratified by the legislature. David Warner was the first Speaker to be elected by their peers. This change reflects a similar reform undertaken by the federal House of Commons in 1986.

The Speaker is usually a member of the governing party. The only exceptions have been Jack Stokes, Nelson Parliament and Hugh Edighoffer.

The Speaker is required to perform their office impartially, but does not resign from their party membership upon taking office. This is identical to the system in place in the federal House of Commons, but stands in contrast to the Speaker of the House of Commons of the United Kingdom. The only Speaker of the Legislative Assembly to have resigned his party affiliation upon election was Nelson Parliament, who was elected in 1920.

== List of speakers of the Legislative Assembly ==
Key:

Ontario Liberal Party
Progressive Conservative Party of Ontario (and predecessor names)
Ontario New Democratic Party

No.	Portrait	Name Electoral district (Birth–Death)	Term of office		Party	Parliament
No.	Portrait	Name Electoral district (Birth–Death)	Term start	Term end	Party	Parliament
1		John Stevenson; MPP for Lennox (1812–1884)	December 27, 1867	December 7, 1871	Conservative	1st
2		Richard William Scott; MPP for Ottawa (1825–1913)	December 7, 1871	December 21, 1871	Liberal	2nd
3		James Currie; MPP for Welland (1827–1901)	December 21, 1871	March 29, 1873	Liberal	2nd
4		Rupert Mearse Wells; MPP for Bruce South (1835–1902)	January 7, 1874	January 7, 1880	Liberal	2nd
4		Rupert Mearse Wells; MPP for Bruce South (1835–1902)	January 7, 1874	January 7, 1880	Liberal	3rd
5		Charles Clarke (Note: Charles Clarke was also Clerk of the Assembly from 1892-1907, being the only Member to serve as both Speaker and Clerk.); MPP for Wellington Centre (1826–1909)	January 7, 1880	February 10, 1887	Liberal	4th
5		Charles Clarke; MPP for Wellington Centre (1826–1909)	January 7, 1880	February 10, 1887	Liberal	5th
6		Jacob Baxter; MPP for Haldimand (1832–1912)	February 10, 1887	February 11, 1891	Liberal	6th
7		Thomas Ballantyne; MPP for Perth South (1829–1908)	February 11, 1891	February 21, 1895	Liberal	7th
8		William Balfour; MPP for Essex South (1851–1896)	February 21, 1895	July 14, 1896	Liberal	8th
9		Alfred Évanturel; MPP for Prescott (1846–1908)	February 10, 1897	March 10, 1903	Liberal	8th
9		Alfred Évanturel; MPP for Prescott (1846–1908)	February 10, 1897	March 10, 1903	Liberal	9th
10		William Andrew Charlton; MPP for Norfolk South (1841–1930)	March 10, 1903	March 22, 1905	Liberal	10th
11		Joseph St. John; MPP for York West (1854–1907)	March 22, 1905	April 7, 1907	Conservative	11th
12		Thomas Crawford; MPP for Toronto West (1847–1932)	April 8, 1907	February 7, 1912	Conservative	11th
12		Thomas Crawford; MPP for Toronto West (1847–1932)	April 8, 1907	February 7, 1912	Conservative	12th
13		William Hoyle; MPP for Ontario North (1842–1918)	February 7, 1912	February 16, 1915	Conservative	13th
14		David Jamieson; MPP for Grey South (1856–1942)	February 16, 1915	March 9, 1920	Conservative	14th
15		Nelson Parliament; MPP for Prince Edward (1877–1967)	March 9, 1920	February 6, 1924	Independent (Note: Nelson Parliament was a member of the Liberal Party, however the Liberals sat in the opposition in the 15th Parliament. As no one in the governing coalition had experience in the Legislature, Parliament was selected from the Opposition to become Speaker by the Premier; he subsequently resigned his party membership and sat as an independent.)	15th
16		Joseph Thompson; MPP for Toronto Northeast (1867–1941)	February 6, 1924	February 2, 1927	Conservative	16th
17		William Black; MPP for Addington (1867–1944)	February 2, 1927	February 5, 1930	Conservative	17th
18		Thomas Kidd; MPP for Kingston (1889–1973)	February 5, 1930	February 20, 1935	Conservative	18th
19		Norman Hipel; MPP for Waterloo South (1890–1953)	February 20, 1935	September 2, 1938	Liberal	19th
19		Norman Hipel; MPP for Waterloo South (1890–1953)	February 20, 1935	September 2, 1938	Liberal	20th
20		James Clark; MPP for Windsor—Sandwich (1888–1952)	March 8, 1939	February 22, 1944	Liberal	20th
21		William James Stewart; MPP for Parkdale (1889–1969)	February 22, 1944	March 21, 1947	Progressive Conservative	21st
21		William James Stewart; MPP for Parkdale (1889–1969)	February 22, 1944	March 21, 1947	Progressive Conservative	22nd
22		James de Congalton Hepburn; MPP for Prince Edward—Lennox (1878–1955)	March 24, 1947	February 10, 1949	Progressive Conservative	22nd
23		M. C. Davies; MPP for Windsor—Walkerville (1897–1970)	February 10, 1949	September 8, 1955	Progressive Conservative	23rd
23		M. C. Davies; MPP for Windsor—Walkerville (1897–1970)	February 10, 1949	September 8, 1955	Progressive Conservative	24th
24		Wally Downer; MPP for Dufferin—Simcoe (1904–1994)	September 8, 1955	January 26, 1960	Progressive Conservative	25th
25		William Murdoch; MPP for Essex South (1904–1984)	January 26, 1960	October 29, 1963	Progressive Conservative	26th
26		Donald Morrow; MPP for Ottawa West (1908–1995)	October 29, 1963	February 14, 1968	Progressive Conservative	27th
27		Frederick Cass; MPP for Grenville—Dundas (1913–2000)	February 14, 1968	December 13, 1971	Progressive Conservative	28th
28		Allan Reuter; MPP for Waterloo South (1914–1982)	December 13, 1971	October 22, 1974	Progressive Conservative	29th
29		Russell Rowe; MPP for Northumberland (1914–1994)	October 22, 1974	October 17, 1977	Progressive Conservative	29th
29		Russell Rowe; MPP for Northumberland (1914–1994)	October 22, 1974	October 17, 1977	Progressive Conservative	30th
29		Russell Rowe; MPP for Northumberland (1914–1994)	October 22, 1974	October 17, 1977	Progressive Conservative	31st
30		Jack Stokes; MPP for Lake Nipigon (1923–2000)	October 17, 1977	April 21, 1981	New Democratic	31st
31		John Melville Turner; MPP for Peterborough (1922–2013)	April 21, 1981	June 4, 1985	Progressive Conservative	32nd
32		Hugh Edighoffer; MPP for Perth (1928–2019)	June 4, 1985	November 19, 1990	Liberal	33rd
32		Hugh Edighoffer; MPP for Perth (1928–2019)	June 4, 1985	November 19, 1990	Liberal	34th
33		David William Warner; MPP for Scarborough—Ellesmere (born 1941)	November 19, 1990	September 26, 1995	New Democratic	35th
34		Al McLean; MPP for Simcoe East (1937–2024)	September 26, 1995	September 26, 1996	Progressive Conservative	36th
35		Ed Doyle; MPP for Wentworth East (born 1935)	September 26, 1996	October 3, 1996	Progressive Conservative	36th
36		Chris Stockwell; MPP for Etobicoke West (1957–2018)	October 3, 1996	October 20, 1999	Progressive Conservative	36th
37		Gary Carr; MPP for Oakville (born 1955)	October 20, 1999	November 19, 2003	Progressive Conservative	37th
38		Alvin Curling; MPP for Scarborough—Rouge River (born 1939)	November 19, 2003	August 19, 2005	Liberal	38th
39		Michael A. Brown; MPP for Algoma—Manitoulin (born 1950)	October 11, 2005	November 28, 2007	Liberal	38th
40		Steve Peters; MPP for Elgin—Middlesex—London (born 1963)	November 28, 2007	November 21, 2011	Liberal	39th
41		Dave Levac; MPP for Brant (born 1954)	November 21, 2011	May 8, 2018	Liberal	40th
41		Dave Levac; MPP for Brant (born 1954)	November 21, 2011	May 8, 2018	Liberal	41st
42		Ted Arnott; MPP for Wellington—Halton Hills (born 1963)	July 11, 2018	April 14, 2025	Progressive Conservative	42nd
42		Ted Arnott; MPP for Wellington—Halton Hills (born 1963)	July 11, 2018	April 14, 2025	Progressive Conservative	43rd
43		Donna Skelly; MPP for Flamborough—Glanbrook (born 1961)	April 14, 2025	Incumbent	Progressive Conservative	44th

== List of current presiding officers ==
The Speaker of the Legislative Assembly is assisted by four other MPPs who are, along with the Speaker, collectively known as the presiding officers. Standing Order 2 of the Legislative Assembly requires that up to three of the five presiding officers hail from the Official Opposition. In the 43rd Parliament, however, the tradition of appointing three Official Opposition presiding officers was broken when three members from the governing Progressive Conservatives were appointed: Ted Arnott by secret ballot, and Donna Skelly and Patrice Barnes by the Government House Leader Paul Calandra, despite the fact that the Official Opposition NDP had put forward Jill Andrew and Jennifer French—in addition to eventual presiding officer Bhutila Karpoche—as appointees. Calandra dismissed Andrew's and French's appointments and selected Karpoche, Barnes and Lucille Collard from the Liberals, despite the Liberals not holding official party status in the Legislature. Skelly's appointment to the Deputy Speaker position was also unusual in that the role was traditionally given to the runner-up of the Speaker's election, which Skelly did not contend in (the true runner-up was Nina Tangri, who was Arnott's only challenger).

The Deputy Speaker is first in line to take the Chair in the absence of the Speaker. The Deputy Speaker is also ex officio the Chair of the Committee of the Whole House. The next three presiding officers are entitled deputy chairs of the Committee of the Whole House.

As with the Speaker, the other presiding officers are required to remain impartial in the Chair, but are not required to resign from their political party. They may participate in debate and vote as with any other member, when not in the Chair.

Title	Incumbent	Party
Speaker of the Legislative Assembly	Donna Skelly	Progressive Conservative Party of Ontario
Deputy Speaker and Chair of the Committee of the Whole House	Effie Triantafilopoulos	Progressive Conservative Party of Ontario
First Deputy Chair of the Committee of the Whole House	Jennifer French	New Democratic Party of Ontario
Second Deputy Chair of the Committee of the Whole House	Ric Bresee	Progressive Conservative Party of Ontario
Third Deputy Chair of the Committee of the Whole House	Andrea Hazell	Ontario Liberal Party

== Residence ==
The Speaker once had both reception space and an apartment within the Ontario Legislative Building. After the closure of Chorley Park in 1937, the reception space was transferred over to the Lieutenant Governor of Ontario, as a non-residential vice regal suite. The Speaker maintains a residence at the Legislature, known as the Speaker's Apartment.

== See also ==
- Speakers of the Legislative Assembly of Upper Canada
