= Bill 167: Equality Rights Statute Amendment Act =

Defeated bill in Ontario Legislative assembly

Legislative Assembly of Ontario
- Long title: Bill 167: An Act to Amend Ontario Statutes to Provide for the Equal Treatment of Persons in Spousal Relationships

Legislative history
- Bill citation: Bill 167
- Introduced by: Marion Boyd, Attorney General of Ontario
- First reading: May 17, 1994
- Second reading: June 9, 1994
- Status: Not passed

Bill 167: Equality Rights Statute Amendment Act was a proposed law in the Canadian province of Ontario, introduced by the New Democratic Party government of Premier Bob Rae in 1994. If enacted, the bill would have provided cohabiting same-sex couples with rights and obligations mostly equal to those of opposite-sex couples in a common-law marriage, by amending the definition of "spouse" in seventy-nine provincial statutes. Despite the changes, the bill did not formally confer same-sex marriage rights in the province, as the definition of marriage in Canada is under federal jurisdiction; instead, the bill proposed a status similar to civil unions for same-sex couples, although it was not explicitly labelled as such since the term was not yet in widespread international use.

The legislation was in part a response to a 1992 ruling by the Ontario Human Rights Tribunal in the case of Michael Leshner and Michael Stark, which obligated the government to provide spousal benefits to same-sex partners of government employees.

The bill was first introduced in the legislature on May 17, 1994, by Attorney General Marion Boyd. The bill passed first reading by a recorded vote of 57 to 52. Vocal opposition increased between first and second reading as public opposition to the bill began to mount so, in an attempt to salvage the bill on second reading, Boyd dropped controversial provisions such as adoption rights. The move did not win any new support for the bill and it was defeated by a recorded vote of 68 to 59 on second reading on June 9, 1994.

== Victoria—Haliburton by-election ==
Liberal leader Lyn McLeod had long pledged her party's support for legislation extending civil rights to same-sex couples; Liberal MPP Tim Murphy, who represented the riding that included Toronto's Church and Wellesley gay village, had even drafted and presented a similar albeit less sweeping private member's bill, Bill 45, which passed first reading in the legislature in June 1993 but was delayed as the government prepared Bill 167.

However, the party's response to the issue was dramatically altered by a provincial by-election in Victoria—Haliburton on March 17, 1994, following the resignation of Dennis Drainville. With the Liberals holding a strong lead in provincewide polling at the time, Liberal candidate Sharon McCrae had been widely expected to win the resulting by-election, but the tide changed when the local Progressive Conservative riding association ran a campaign ad:

SOME PEOPLE HAVE THEIR PRIORITIES WRONG
The NDP and the Liberals have their priorities all mixed up. The NDP Government's new priority is to introduce a law that would provide gay and lesbian couples with the same family benefits as married couples. The Liberals not only support this idea—their leader, Lyn McLeod, has been pushing it personally for months. Chris Hodgson feels that government should be focused on job creation, not on new spending schemes that will increase the cost of doing business in Ontario and drive jobs away. If you think that jobs should be the first priority for Victoria—Haliburton, support Chris Hodgson on March 17.

The ad resulted in Progressive Conservative candidate Chris Hodgson quickly gaining support at the expense of McCrae, and ultimately winning the by-election. Bill 167 consequently came to be seen by the Liberal party as an electoral liability, causing "great panic" in the caucus and leading several Liberal MPPs to switch sides on the issue. As a result, McLeod chose to withdraw the party's support of the bill, and just three Liberal MPPs — including Murphy, who remained the bill's single most vocal supporter — continued to support it. Several federal Liberal MPs, including Jean Augustine, Barry Campbell, Bill Graham, Shaughnessy Cohen and Hedy Fry, intervened to encourage McLeod not to withdraw support, to no avail.

While the withdrawal of Liberal support did not kill the bill by itself, as the New Democrats still had enough votes to pass it if their caucus had been united, twelve New Democratic MPPs were also opposed to the legislation. Rae ultimately permitted a free vote on the bill within his caucus, albeit with the warning that he would not support the dissenting MPPs if they ran for re-election in the 1995 election.

== Outside opposition ==
Opposition to the legislation was also noted outside the legislature.

Aloysius Ambrozic, the archbishop of the Roman Catholic Archdiocese of Toronto stated his objections to the bill granting same-sex couples equal standing to opposite-sex ones, although he insisted that he did not oppose protecting the rights of individual homosexual people. Don Pennell, the leader of the minor socially-conservative Family Coalition Party of Ontario, was quoted as saying that "homosexuals may choose to behave in a certain way but it is wrong for the government to legally sanction and support these choices. This legislation would have put heterosexual and homosexual relationships on virtually the same level, which is morally reprehensible and economically foolish."

== Final vote ==
The final recorded vote on the second reading of Bill 167 was as follows:

=== Yeas: 59 ===
- New Democrats: Zanana Akande, Richard Allen, Gilles Bisson, Marion Boyd, Elmer Buchanan, Jenny Carter, Brian Charlton, David Christopherson, Marilyn Churley, Dave Cooke, Shirley Coppen, George Dadamo, Noel Duignan, Derek Fletcher, Bob Frankford, Evelyn Gigantes, Ruth Grier, Christel Haeck, Howard Hampton, Margaret Harrington, Karen Haslam, Randy Hope, Bob Huget, Norm Jamison, Paul Johnson, Paul Klopp, Peter Kormos, Frances Lankin, Floyd Laughren, Wayne Lessard, Bob Mackenzie, Ellen MacKinnon, Gary Malkowski, Rosario Marchese, Shelley Martel, Tony Martin, Irene Mathyssen, Mark Morrow, Sharon Murdock, Larry O'Connor, Steve Owens, Ed Philip, Gilles Pouliot, Bob Rae, Tony Silipo, Kimble Sutherland, Anne Swarbrick, Brad Ward, Shelley Wark-Martyn, Paul Wessenger, Bud Wildman, Gary Wilson, David Winninger, Jim Wiseman, Len Wood, Elaine Ziemba.
- Liberals: Tim Murphy, Jean Poirier, Dianne Poole.

=== Nays: 68 ===
- New Democrats: Donald Abel, Mike Cooper, Mike Farnan, Ron Hansen, Patrick Hayes, Giorgio Mammoliti, Gord Mills, Anthony Perruzza, Allan Pilkey, Tony Rizzo, Dan Waters, Fred Wilson.
- Liberals: Charles Beer, Jim Bradley, Mike Brown, Bob Callahan, Elinor Caplan, Bob Chiarelli, John Cleary, Sean Conway, Joseph Cordiano, Bruce Crozier, Alvin Curling, Hans Daigeler, Ronald Eddy, Murray Elston, Joan Fawcett, Bernard Grandmaître, Jim Henderson, Monte Kwinter, Steve Mahoney, Carman McClelland, Dalton McGuinty, Lyn McLeod, Frank Miclash, Gilles Morin, Steve Offer, Hugh O'Neil, Yvonne O'Neill, Gerry Phillips, David Ramsay, Tony Ruprecht, Greg Sorbara, Barbara Sullivan.
- Progressive Conservatives: Ted Arnott, Gary Carr, Don Cousens, Dianne Cunningham, Ernie Eves, Charles Harnick, Mike Harris, Chris Hodgson, Cam Jackson, Dave Johnson, Leo Jordan, Margaret Marland, Al McLean, Bill Murdoch, Bob Runciman, Norm Sterling, Chris Stockwell, David Tilson, David Turnbull, Noble Villeneuve, Jim Wilson, Elizabeth Witmer.
- Independents: Peter North, John Sola.

== Aftermath ==
In the immediate moments after the bill was defeated, gay activists in the visitors' gallery of the legislature began to loudly protest and were quickly chased out of the building, in some cases violently, by Ontario Provincial Police officers. According to Toronto Sun columnist Christie Blatchford:

It all came down, in the end, to dozens of the Queen's Park security guards donning rubber gloves and breaking open a duffle bag full of billy clubs. So protected (Against what? AIDS? Women holding hands? Men wearing T-shirts with pink triangles?), they linked arms and moved on the gays and lesbians who had been sitting quietly all afternoon, in the public galleries. The security officers-a mix of Ontario Provincial Police and the Ontario Government Protective Service-let the gays and lesbians blow off a little steam and then chased them down a flight of stairs from the second floor to the main floor of the Legislative building, out of the foyer and into the lovely evening light. [S]ome of them had been hit by billy clubs, a couple had been dragged away, some had been pushed down the stairs ...

Over the next two hours, crowds of protestors began to gather in both Toronto and Ottawa and marched through the streets in what the LGBT newspaper Xtra! would later characterize as the largest spontaneous demonstration of queer anger in the province since Operation Soap. Xtra! also argued that the failure of Bill 167 provided other governments with a roadmap of how not to handle controversial LGBT rights legislation and paved the way for future successes. In 1995, the NDP government in British Columbia successfully passed an LGBT rights bill that included adoption rights.

McLeod's decision to withdraw the party's support of Bill 167 led to ongoing criticism, with activists and opposing politicians branding her as a "flip-flopper" who could not be trusted to keep a campaign promise. That in turn contributed significantly to the party's defeat in the 1995 election, during which some Progressive Conservative election ads depicted McLeod as a weathervane continually shifting direction with the wind. The resulting perception of untrustworthiness proved more damaging to the party's election prospects than the same-sex benefits issue itself. Even Murphy, who should seemingly have been spared by his status as a champion of LGBT civil rights in the most broadly LGBT-friendly electoral district in the province, was himself defeated by PC candidate Al Leach. Similarly, the governing New Democrats were trounced in the 1995 election; although many of the MPPs who had voted in favour of the legislation were defeated, so were all 12 of the dissidents.

The gay community in Ontario held the Rae government's handling of the bill against the party for many years. In his book On the Fringe: Gays and Lesbians in Politics, the political scientist David Rayside argued that both Rae and Boyd mishandled the bill by miscalculating its ability to pass on a free vote, by failing to pair it with a comprehensive public relations campaign to properly educate voters on why it was needed, and by doing little to manage the misgivings of opposing MPPs until the last minute. Even as late as 2003, Chris Phibbs, a former assistant to Toronto city councillor Kyle Rae, cited the failure of Bill 167 as her primary reason for refusing to seek the NDP endorsement in her own campaign for a city council seat in the 2003 municipal election. The bill's defeat also led to the creation of the activist group Foundation for Equal Families.

=== Subsequent legislation ===
Bill 5, a similar bill providing same-sex couples with equivalent statutory rights and responsibilities to opposite-sex common-law spouses under 67 provincial statutes, became law under the Progressive Conservative government of Mike Harris in 1999 to make changes required by the Supreme Court of Canada's ruling in M v H. It included joint adoption rights.

Same-sex marriage in Ontario was ultimately legalized in 2003 when the Court of Appeal for Ontario, deciding on Halpern v Canada (AG), upheld a lower court ruling which declared that defining marriage in heterosexual-only terms violated the Canadian Charter of Rights and Freedoms. Same-sex marriage was legalized nationwide with the passage of the federal Civil Marriage Act in 2005.
