= Shirley Collins (politician) =

Canadian politician (born 1952)

The Honourable Shirley Collins ECO

Ontario MPP
- In office 1987–1990
- Preceded by: New riding
- Succeeded by: Mark Morrow
- Constituency: Wentworth East

Personal details
- Born: October 7, 1952 (age 73) Hamilton, Ontario
- Party: Liberal
- Spouse: Robert Rankin
- Children: 2, including Chad Collins

Shirley Jean Collins (born October 7, 1952) is a former politician in Ontario, Canada. She served in the Legislative Assembly of Ontario as a Liberal from 1987 to 1990, and was a Cabinet Minister in the government of David Peterson.

== Background ==
Collins was educated at McMaster University. She was a special assistant to federal Member of Parliament Hon. John Munro from 1979 to 1981, and a constituency assistant to Member of Provincial Parliament Sheila Copps from 1981 to 1982. From 1982 to 1987, Collins served as an alderman and regional councillor for Hamilton, Ontario City Council. Her husband, Robert Rankin, is a retired staff sergeant with Hamilton Police Services.

Her son Chad Collins was a member of Hamilton, Ontario City Council for many years, until being elected to the House of Commons of Canada in the 2021 Canadian federal election.

== Politics ==
Collins ran for the Ontario Legislature in the 1985 provincial election, losing to incumbent New Democrat Robert W. Mackenzie by 1,600 votes in the Hamilton East constituency. In the 1987 election, she was handily elected in the neighbouring riding of Wentworth East.

Collins served as the Parliamentary Assistant to Hon. Greg Sorbara, Minister of Labour and Women's Issues. On August 2, 1989, Collins was named a Minister without Portfolio Responsible for People with Disabilities. She held this position until the September 1990 election.

The Liberals were defeated by the New Democratic Party in the 1990 provincial election, and Collins lost her seat to NDP candidate Mark Morrow by 3,147 votes in the NDP sweep led by Bob Rae. She ran again in the 1995 election, but lost to Progressive Conservative Ed Doyle by 3,606 votes when the Progressive Conservatives formed a government.

== Later life ==
After leaving the Ontario Legislature, Collins became the owner and operator of a private investigation agency, Collins Investigation Services, in Hamilton, Ontario. She was appointed to the appeal division of the Immigration and Refugee Board of Canada in 2003. In 2006 she worked in the professional development department of the same board until she became a member of the Ontario Landlord and Tenant Board from 2009 to 2014 when she retired at the end of her term.
