= London Centre (provincial electoral district) =

Former provincial electoral district in Ontario, Canada

Ontario electoral district

Defunct provincial electoral district
- Legislature: Legislative Assembly of Ontario
- District created: 1975
- District abolished: 1996
- First contested: 1975
- Last contested: 1995

London Centre was a provincial electoral district in Ontario, Canada, that was abolished in 1996. It was located in London, and was notable for being represented by David Peterson, an Ontario Liberal who served as Premier of Ontario from 1985 to 1990.

== Boundaries ==
Just prior to the 1975 election, the riding of London Centre was created. It consisted of the following boundary: commencing at the intersection of the Thames River and Highbury Avenue it went north along Highbury Avenue to Huron Street, west to Adelaide Street and then north to the North Thames River. It then went southwest following the river to Wharncliffe Road North and then south to Essex Street, then west to Platts Lane and south to Oxford Street. It then went east to Woodward Avenue and south to Mount Pleasant Avenue and then west to the Canadian National Railway line. It followed the railway southeast to the Thames River and then southeast following the river back to Highbury Avenue. Minor changes were made in 1986 but essentially the riding still occupied the central part of the city.

In 1996, a major electoral riding redistribution occurred which abolished the riding. Overall 130 seats were reduced to 103 which harmonized the provincial riding boundaries with those of the already existing federal ridings. A large portion of the riding was incorporated into the new riding of London North Centre. The southeast corner of the riding was incorporated into the riding of London—Fanshawe.

== Members of Provincial Parliament ==
London Centre
| Assembly | Years | Member | Party |
|---|---|---|---|
Created from London North and London South
| 30th | 1975–1977 | David Peterson | Liberal |
| 31st | 1977–1981 | David Peterson | Liberal |
| 32nd | 1981–1985 | David Peterson | Liberal |
| 33rd | 1985–1987 | David Peterson | Liberal |
| 34th | 1987–1990 | David Peterson | Liberal |
| 35th | 1990–1995 | Marion Boyd | New Democratic |
| 36th | 1995–1999 | Marion Boyd | New Democratic |
Sourced from the Ontario Legislative Assembly
Merged into London North Centre and London—Fanshawe

== Electoral history ==
1995 Ontario general election
| Party | Candidate | Votes | % | ±% |
|---|---|---|---|---|
| New Democratic | Marion Boyd | 11,096 | 36.77 | –14.54 |
| Progressive Conservative | Patrick McGuinness | 9,364 | 31.03 | +15.64 |
| Liberal | Ron Postian | 7,559 | 25.05 | –2.77 |
| Family Coalition | Mike Dwyer | 1,041 | 3.45 | +0.62 |
| Green | Jeff Culbert | 533 | 1.77 | – |
| Freedom | Lloyd Walker | 452 | 1.50 | +0.07 |
| Natural Law | Liz Overall | 134 | 0.44 | – |
| Total valid votes | | 30,179 | 100.00 | |
| Total rejected ballots | | – | | |
| Turnout | | 30,179 | 53.26 | –12.79 |
| Eligible voters | | 56,666 | | |
| New Democratic hold | | Swing | | –15.09 |
Source: Elections Ontario

1990 Ontario general election
| Party | Candidate | Votes | % | ±% |
|---|---|---|---|---|
| New Democratic | Marion Boyd | 17,837 | 51.31 | +23.21 |
| Liberal | David Peterson | 9,671 | 27.82 | –27.34 |
| Progressive Conservative | Mark Handelman | 5,348 | 15.38 | +3.67 |
| Family Coalition | John van Gelderen | 982 | 2.82 | +0.72 |
| Freedom | Lloyd Walker | 498 | 1.43 | –0.35 |
| Independent | Terry D. Smart | 272 | 0.78 | – |
| Communist | Issam Mansour | 84 | 0.24 | – |
| Independent | Sid Tarleton | 73 | 0.21 | – |
| Total valid votes | | 34,765 | 98.66 | |
| Total rejected, unmarked and declined ballots | | 471 | 1.34 | +0.77 |
| Turnout | | 35,236 | 66.05 | +9.45 |
| Eligible voters | | 53,347 | | |
| New Democratic gain from Liberal | | Swing | | +25.28 |
Source: Elections Ontario

1987 Ontario general election
| Party | Candidate | Votes | % | ±% |
|---|---|---|---|---|
| Liberal | David Peterson | 18,194 | 55.16 | +0.36 |
| New Democratic | Marion Boyd | 9,266 | 28.09 | +10.97 |
| Progressive Conservative | Dennis McKaig | 3,864 | 11.72 | –14.77 |
| Family Coalition | Brenda Jewell Rowe | 695 | 2.11 | – |
| Freedom | Lloyd Walker | 589 | 1.79 | +0.20 |
| Independent | Stunning Bentley | 375 | 1.14 | – |
| Total valid votes | | 32,983 | 99.43 | |
| Total rejected ballots | | 189 | 0.57 | +0.17 |
| Turnout | | 33,172 | 56.60 | +3.85 |
| Eligible voters | | 58,611 | | |
| Liberal hold | | Swing | | –5.30 |
Source: Elections Ontario

1985 Ontario general election
| Party | Candidate | Votes | % | ±% |
|---|---|---|---|---|
| Liberal | David Peterson | 13,890 | 54.80 | +3.13 |
| Progressive Conservative | Bill Rudd | 6,714 | 26.49 | –8.46 |
| New Democratic | Peter Cassidy | 4,340 | 17.12 | +3.74 |
| Freedom | Michelle McColm | 403 | 1.59 | – |
| Total valid votes | | 25,347 | 99.60 | |
| Total rejected ballots | | 101 | 0.40 | –0.06 |
| Turnout | | 25,448 | 52.75 | +3.16 |
| Eligible voters | | 48,247 | | |
| Liberal hold | | Swing | | +5.79 |
Source: Elections Ontario

1981 Ontario general election
| Party | Candidate | Votes | % | ±% |
|---|---|---|---|---|
| Liberal | David Peterson | 12,315 | 51.67 | +6.26 |
| Progressive Conservative | Russ Monteith | 8,329 | 34.95 | +3.34 |
| New Democratic | Diane Risler | 3,189 | 13.38 | –8.88 |
| Total valid votes | | 23,833 | 99.54 | |
| Total rejected ballots | | 110 | 0.46 | –0.06 |
| Turnout | | 23,943 | 49.58 | –9.87 |
| Eligible voters | | 48,291 | | |
| Liberal hold | | Swing | | +1.46 |
Source: Elections Ontario

1977 Ontario general election
| Party | Candidate | Votes | % | ±% |
|---|---|---|---|---|
| Liberal | David Peterson | 12,808 | 45.42 | +5.05 |
| Progressive Conservative | Frank Ross | 8,915 | 31.61 | +0.20 |
| New Democratic | Stuart Ross | 6,279 | 22.26 | –5.22 |
| Independent | Agnes Shaw | 200 | 0.71 | –0.03 |
| Total valid votes | | 28,202 | 99.48 | |
| Total rejected ballots | | 147 | 0.52 | +0.09 |
| Turnout | | 28,349 | 59.45 | –1.57 |
| Eligible voters | | 47,683 | | |
| Liberal hold | | Swing | | +2.42 |
Source: Elections Ontario

1975 Ontario general election
| Party | Candidate | Votes | % |
|---|---|---|---|
| Liberal | David Peterson | 11,572 | 40.37 |
| Progressive Conservative | Earle Terry | 9,003 | 31.41 |
| New Democratic | Pat Chefurka | 7,878 | 27.48 |
| Independent | Agnes Shaw | 213 | 0.74 |
| Total valid votes | | 28,666 | 99.57 |
| Total rejected ballots | | 123 | 0.43 |
| Turnout | | 28,789 | 61.02 |
| Eligible voters | | 47,178 | |
| Liberal pickup new district. | | | |
Source: Elections Ontario

== See also ==
- List of Ontario provincial electoral districts
- Canadian provincial electoral districts
