= Lawrence (electoral district) =

Former provincial electoral district in Ontario, Canada

Ontario electoral district

Defunct provincial electoral district
- Legislature: Legislative Assembly of Ontario
- District created: 1987
- District abolished: 1996
- First contested: 1987
- Last contested: 1995

Demographics
- Census division: Toronto
- Census subdivision: Toronto

Lawrence was a provincial electoral district in Ontario, Canada. It was created prior to the 1987 provincial election from the parts of York South, Downsview, Wilson Heights and Armourdale and eliminated in 1996, when it was split between the ridings of York South—Weston and Eglinton—Lawrence.

== Members of Provincial Parliament ==
Lawrence
Assembly	Years	Member	Party
Created from parts of York South, Downsview, Wilson Heights and Armourdale ridings in 1987
34th	1987–1990	Joseph Cordiano	Liberal
35th	1990–1995	Joseph Cordiano	Liberal
36th	1995–1999	Joseph Cordiano	Liberal
Sourced from the Ontario Legislative Assembly
Merged into York South—Weston and Eglinton—Lawrence ridings after 1996

== Election results ==
1995 Ontario general election
Party	Candidate	Votes	%	±%
Liberal	Joseph Cordiano	11,784	45.88	+1.18
Progressive Conservative	Emilia Valentini	7,955	30.97	+17.48
New Democratic	Donato Santeramo	5,000	19.47	–19.14
Natural Law	Roy Anderson	698	2.72	–
Green	Eric Saumur	246	0.96	–0.60
Total valid votes		25,683	98.42	
Total rejected, unmarked and declined ballots		412	1.58	–0.01
Turnout		26,095	65.08	–0.60
Eligible voters		40,099		
Liberal hold		Swing		–8.15
Source: Elections Ontario

1990 Ontario general election
Party	Candidate	Votes	%	±%
Liberal	Joseph Cordiano	11,786	44.70	–8.32
New Democratic	Shalom Schachter	10,179	38.61	+10.24
Progressive Conservative	Henry Gallay	3,557	13.49	–5.11
Libertarian	Sandor L. Hegedus	431	1.63	–
Green	Paul Rombough	411	1.56	–
Total valid votes		26,364	98.41	
Total rejected, unmarked and declined ballots		425	1.59	+0.82
Turnout		26,789	65.68	–1.23
Eligible voters		40,787		
Liberal hold		Swing		–9.28
Source: Elections Ontario

1987 Ontario general election
Party	Candidate	Votes	%
Liberal	Joseph Cordiano	15,332	53.03
New Democratic	Evelyn Murialdo	8,201	28.37
Progressive Conservative	David Perry	5,379	18.60
Total valid votes		28,912	99.23
Total rejected ballots		223	0.77
Turnout		29,135	66.91
Eligible voters		43,542	
Liberal pickup new district.			
Source: Elections Ontario

== See also ==
- List of Ontario provincial electoral districts
- Canadian provincial electoral districts
