= John Sweeney (Canadian politician) =

Canadian politician

Ontario MPP
- In office 1975–1990
- Preceded by: New riding
- Succeeded by: Mike Cooper
- Constituency: Kitchener—Wilmot

Personal details
- Born: June 20, 1931 Saint John, New Brunswick, Canada
- Died: July 7, 2001 (aged 70) Kitchener, Ontario, Canada
- Party: Liberal
- Spouse: Kay
- Children: 10
- Occupation: Teacher

John Roland Sweeney (June 20, 1931 – July 7, 2001) was a politician in Ontario, Canada. He was a Liberal member of the Legislative Assembly of Ontario from 1975 to 1990. He was a cabinet minister in the government of David Peterson.

== Background ==
Sweeney moved to Ontario in his youth, and was educated at the University of Toronto, receiving a Bachelor of Arts degree and a Master's Degree in Education.

== Politics ==
A devout Roman Catholic, Sweeney served as the Waterloo Catholic District School Board's first director of education from 1969 until 1975.

In 1975, he ran as a Liberal candidate in the 1975 election for the riding of Kitchener—Wilmot. Sweeney defeated Progressive Conservative Morley Rosenberg by 1,745 votes. He was re-elected with increased majorities in the elections of 1977 and 1981. He sat on the opposition benches until the Liberals formed government under David Peterson following the 1985 election.

He was a candidate in the 1982 Liberal leadership convention, but was eliminated on the first ballot, finishing last in a field of five candidates with only 122 votes.

In 1985, Sweeney was easily re-elected in his own riding. He was appointed Minister of Community and Social Services on June 26, 1985. He was retained in this position following the 1987 election, and was named Minister of Municipal Affairs and Housing on August 2, 1989.

In 1989, Sweeney extended the Special Services at Home (SSAH) program to adults with developmental disabilities.

Sweeney was strongly anti-abortion, and was vocal about his views on the subject. He did not support the Peterson government's liberalization of access to abortion in the late 1980s.

Sweeney did not run in the 1990 election, although he worked as a lobbyist at Queen's Park in the 1990s.

=== Cabinet positions ===
Peterson ministry, Province of Ontario (1985–1990)
Cabinet posts (2)
Predecessor	Office	Successor
Chaviva Hošek (Housing); John Eakins (Municipal Affairs)	Minister of Municipal Affairs and Housing; 1989–1990	Dave Cooke
Ernie Eves	Minister of Community and Social Services; 1985–1989	Charles Beer

== Later life ==
Out of politics, he became chair of the Canadian branch of Habitat for Humanity, and served as Chancellor of St. Jerome's University from 1992. He was hired to examine Ontario's education system in the 1990s, and recommended cutting the number of school boards. In 1999, Sweeney joined with Alan Redway and Marion Dewar to release "Where's Home?", a comprehensive study of housing in Ontario.

He died in 2001, aged 70, from a heart attack, having survived several such attacks in the past. He left his wife, Kay, and their 10 children. There is a John Sweeney Catholic Elementary School in Kitchener, Ontario named after him.
