= Kitchener—Wilmot =

Former provincial electoral district in Ontario, Canada

Ontario electoral district

Defunct provincial electoral district
- Legislature: Legislative Assembly of Ontario
- District created: 1974
- District abolished: 1996
- First contested: 1975
- Last contested: 1995

Kitchener—Wilmot was a provincial electoral district in Ontario, Canada. It existed from 1975 to 1999, when it was abolished when ridings were redistributed to match their federal counterpart. It consisted of areas around Kitchener and Wilmot.

== Members of Provincial Parliament ==
- John Sweeney (Liberal) (1975–1990)
- Mike Cooper (New Democrat) (1990–1995)
- Gary Leadston (Progressive Conservative) (1995–1999)

Kitchener—Wilmot
Assembly	Years	Member	Party
Riding created out of Waterloo North and Waterloo South
30th	1975–1977	John Sweeney	Liberal
31st	1977–1981	John Sweeney	Liberal
32nd	1981–1985	John Sweeney	Liberal
33rd	1985–1987	John Sweeney	Liberal
34th	1987–1990	John Sweeney	Liberal
35th	1990–1995	Mike Cooper	New Democratic
36th	1995–1999	Gary Leadston	Progressive Conservative
Riding dissolved into Kitchener Centre and Kitchener—Waterloo

== Election results ==
1995 Ontario general election
Party	Candidate	Votes	%	±%
Progressive Conservative	Gary Leadston	17,392	45.70	+25.60
Liberal	Shelly Schlueter	10,106	26.55	–3.19
New Democratic	Mike Cooper	8,146	21.40	–22.54
Family Coalition	Ted Kryn	2,415	6.35	+0.13
Total valid votes		38,059	98.98	
Total rejected, unmarked and declined ballots		394	1.02	–0.62
Turnout		38,453	59.07	–1.02
Eligible voters		65,102		
Progressive Conservative gain from New Democratic		Swing		+24.07
Source: Elections Ontario

1990 Ontario general election
Party	Candidate	Votes	%	±%
New Democratic	Mike Cooper	16,056	43.94	+19.64
Liberal	Carl Zehr	10,869	29.75	–29.05
Progressive Conservative	Lance Bryant	7,342	20.09	+3.19
Family Coalition	Thomas J. Borys	2,270	6.21	–
Total valid votes		36,537	98.36	
Total rejected, unmarked and declined ballots		611	1.64	+1.13
Turnout		37,148	60.09	+4.70
Eligible voters		61,820		
New Democratic gain from Liberal		Swing		+24.34
Source: Elections Ontario

1987 Ontario general election
Party	Candidate	Votes	%	±%
Liberal	John Sweeney	18,151	58.79	+4.41
New Democratic	Mike Cooper	7,503	24.30	+8.41
Progressive Conservative	Dorothy Angel	5,218	16.90	–12.82
Total valid votes		30,872	99.48	
Total rejected ballots		160	0.52	–0.00
Turnout		31,032	55.39	+0.24
Eligible voters		56,021		
Liberal hold		Swing		–2.00
Source: Elections Ontario

1985 Ontario general election
Party	Candidate	Votes	%	±%
Liberal	John Sweeney	15,987	54.38	+5.83
Progressive Conservative	Jim Ziegler	8,737	29.72	–6.18
New Democratic	Mike Cooper	4,673	15.90	+0.35
Total valid votes		29,397	99.48	
Total rejected ballots		153	0.52	+0.27
Turnout		29,550	55.15	+5.73
Eligible voters		53,579		
Liberal hold		Swing		+6.00
Source: Elections Ontario

1981 Ontario general election
Party	Candidate	Votes	%	±%
Liberal	John Sweeney	11,515	48.56	–2.52
Progressive Conservative	Alan Barron	8,513	35.90	+9.36
New Democratic	Hemi Mitic	3,686	15.54	–6.84
Total valid votes		23,714	99.75	
Total rejected ballots		60	0.25	–0.09
Turnout		23,774	49.42	–8.57
Eligible voters		48,108		
Liberal hold		Swing		–5.94
Source: Elections Ontario

1977 Ontario general election
Party	Candidate	Votes	%	±%
Liberal	John Sweeney	12,450	51.07	+10.36
Progressive Conservative	Curtis L. Roth	6,470	26.54	+0.81
New Democratic	Jo Surich	5,456	22.38	–11.17
Total valid votes		24,376	99.66	
Total rejected ballots		84	0.34	+0.04
Turnout		24,460	57.99	–6.34
Eligible voters		42,181		
Liberal hold		Swing		+4.77
Source: Elections Ontario

1975 Ontario general election
Party	Candidate	Votes	%
Liberal	John Sweeney	9,929	40.71
New Democratic	Morley Rosenberg	8,184	33.56
Progressive Conservative	Colin O'Brian	6,275	25.73
Total valid votes		24,388	99.69
Total rejected ballots		75	0.31
Turnout		24,463	64.33
Eligible voters		38,026	
Liberal pickup new district.			
Source: Elections Ontario

== See also ==
- List of Ontario provincial electoral districts
- Canadian provincial electoral districts
