= Mike Cooper (politician) =

Canadian politician

Ontario MPP
- In office 1990–1995
- Preceded by: John Sweeney
- Succeeded by: Gary Leadston
- Constituency: Kitchener—Wilmot

Personal details
- Born: July 31, 1951 (age 74) London, Ontario
- Party: New Democrat
- Spouse: Heather
- Children: 2
- Occupation: Rubber plant worker

Mike Cooper (born July 31, 1951) is a former Canadian politician in Ontario. He served as a New Democratic Party member of the Legislative Assembly of Ontario from 1990 to 1995. He represented the riding of Kitchener—Wilmot.

== Background ==
Cooper was educated at vocational school and was a rubber worker at Uniroyal Goodrich for 17 years. He served as steward of United Rubber Workers Local 667.

== Politics ==
Cooper ran for the Ontario legislature in the provincial election of 1985, but finished third against Liberal incumbent John Sweeney in the riding of Kitchener—Wilmot. He ran again in the 1987 provincial election, this time finishing second against Sweeney.

The NDP won a majority government in the provincial election of 1990 and Cooper defeated Liberal newcomer Carl Zehr by over 5,000 votes. In November 1990, he was appointed as Deputy Government Whip where he remained for another four years. In November 1992, he was appointed as parliamentary assistant to the Solicitor General. In February 1993, he was reassigned as parliamentary assistant to the Minister of Labour.

In 1994, Cooper was one of twelve NDP members to vote against Bill 167, a bill extending financial benefits to same-sex partners. Premier Bob Rae allowed a free vote on the bill which allowed members of his party to vote with their conscience.

The NDP was defeated in the 1995 provincial election and Cooper again finished third in the Kitchener—Wilmot riding, placing over 9,000 votes behind Progressive Conservative Gary Leadston. He returned to his job making tires after his defeat.

Cooper ran for the federal New Democratic Party in the Canadian general election of 1997 in Waterloo—Wellington, but finished a distant fourth against Liberal Lynn Myers.
