= Mark Morrow =

Canadian politician

Ontario MPP
- In office 1990–1995
- Preceded by: Shirley Collins
- Succeeded by: Ed Doyle
- Constituency: Wentworth East

Personal details
- Born: April 2, 1960 (age 66) Hamilton, Ontario
- Party: New Democrat
- Occupation: Lathe Operator

Mark Morrow (born April 2, 1960) is a politician in Ontario, Canada. He was a New Democratic Party member of the Legislative Assembly of Ontario from 1990 to 1995.

== Background ==
Morrow graduated High School from Scott Park Secondary, he then proceeded to take some college business courses. Prior to his election, he was a shipper receiver and also worked in places such as Stelco, Dofasco and other industrial jobs.

== Politics ==
He was elected to the Ontario legislature in the 1990 provincial election, defeating Liberal incumbent Shirley Collins by 3,147 votes in the Hamilton-area riding of Wentworth East. The NDP formed a majority government and Morrow served as a government backbencher during his time in office.

Morrow quickly emerged as a leading ally of maverick left-wing Member of Provincial Parliament (MPP) Peter Kormos within the NDP caucus. Like Kormos, Morrow was a vocal opponent of the Rae government's decision to back away from its pledge to introduce public automobile insurance to the province. In 1993, Morrow, Kormos and Karen Haslam were the only members of the NDP caucus to vote against the Rae government's Social Contract legislation, which restructured the province's labour laws and introduced unpaid leave days for some workers.

The NDP were defeated in the 1995 provincial election. Notwithstanding his maverick status, Morrow was unable to overcome the provincial trend and finished third in Wentworth East against Progressive Conservative Ed Doyle.
