= Gary Leadston =

Canadian politician

Ontario MPP
- In office 1995–1999
- Preceded by: Mike Cooper
- Succeeded by: Riding abolished
- Constituency: Kitchener—Wilmot

Personal details
- Born: June 24, 1941 Guelph, Ontario, Canada
- Died: December 2, 2013 (aged 72) Rideau Ferry, Ontario, Canada
- Party: Progressive Conservative
- Spouse: Anna Leadston
- Children: 2
- Occupation: Police constable
- Portfolio: Assistant Deputy Government Whip (1997-1999)

Gary L. Leadston (June 24, 1941 – December 2, 2013) was a politician in Ontario, Canada. He served as a Progressive Conservative member of the Legislative Assembly of Ontario from 1995 to 1999.

== Background ==
Leadston was born in Guelph, Ontario. He was educated at Ontario Police College and Wilfrid Laurier University. He worked as a police constable in Kitchener, Ontario. He was also the founding member of the Big Brothers Association in Kitchener Waterloo in the 1970s and served as its president in 1975–1976.

== Politics ==
Leadston served as a city councillor for Kitchener City Council from 1979 to 1994, and also served on the Regional Municipality of Waterloo from 1981 to 1994. In 1987, he was named as chair of the Waterloo Regional Police Commission.

Leadston was elected to the Ontario legislature in the 1995 provincial election in Kitchener—Wilmot, defeating Liberal candidate Shelley Schlueter and incumbent New Democratic Mike Cooper by a plurality of 7,000 votes. He served as a backbench supporter of the government of Mike Harris for the next four years.

In September 1996, he put his name forward to run for speaker to replace the disgraced Al McLean. However Chris Stockwell won out over a slate of seven other candidates including Leadston.

In 1996, the Harris government reduced the number of ridings from 130 to 103. This meant that sitting MPPs had to compete for re-nomination in some ridings. Leadston ran for the Kitchener Centre PC nomination in 1999, but was defeated by Wayne Wettlaufer. In 2000, he sought the federal Canadian Alliance nomination in Lanark—Carleton, but lost to Scott Reid.

== Later life ==
Leadston died at his home on December 2, 2013, from cancer.
