= Wentworth East =

Ontario electoral district

Defunct provincial electoral district
- Legislature: Legislative Assembly of Ontario
- District created: 1986
- District abolished: 1996
- First contested: 1987
- Last contested: 1995

Wentworth East was a provincial riding in Ontario, Canada, that was created for the 1987 election. It was abolished prior to the 1999 election. It was merged into the riding of Stoney Creek.

== Members of Provincial Parliament ==
Wentworth East
Assembly	Years	Member	Party
Created in 1955 from Wentworth
25th	1955–1959	Reg Gisborn	Co-operative Commonwealth
26th	1959–1963	Reg Gisborn	Co-operative Commonwealth
26th	1963–1967	Reg Gisborn	New Democratic
Riding abolished in 1967 into Wentworth, Hamilton East and Hamilton Centre
Riding re-established in 1987 from Wentworth
34th	1987–1990	Shirley Collins	Liberal
35th	1990–1995	Mark Morrow	New Democratic
36th	1995–1999	Ed Doyle	Progressive Conservative
Merged into Stoney Creek after 1996
Sourced from the Ontario Legislative Assembly

== Election results ==
1995 Ontario general election
Party	Candidate	Votes	%	±%
Progressive Conservative	Ed Doyle	15,888	44.50	+28.06
Liberal	Shirley Collins	12,282	34.40	-1.00
New Democratic	Mark Morrow	6,667	18.68	-25.96
Independent	Mark S. Davies	863	2.42	
Total valid votes		35,700	98.71	
Total rejected, unmarked, and declined ballots		467	1.29	-0.37
Turnout		36,167	64.56	-2.26
Eligible voters		56,023		
Progressive Conservative gain from New Democratic		Swing		+27.01
Source: Elections Ontario

1990 Ontario general election
Party	Candidate	Votes	%	±%
New Democratic	Mark Morrow	15,224	44.63	+16.54
Liberal	Shirley Collins	12,077	35.41	-16.90
Progressive Conservative	Douglas Conley	5,609	16.44	-1.62
Green	Victor Kammerer	668	1.96	
Independent	Albert Papazian	273	0.80	
Independent	Ann Stasiuk	260	0.76	-0.78
Total valid votes		34,111	98.34	
Total rejected, unmarked, and declined ballots		577	1.66	+1.01
Turnout		34,688	66.82	+2.50
Eligible voters		51,912		
New Democratic gain from Liberal		Swing		+16.72
Source: Elections Ontario

1987 Ontario general election
Party	Candidate	Votes	%
Liberal	Shirley Collins	16,153	52.31
New Democratic	Sharon Lehnert	8,676	28.09
Progressive Conservative	Barbara Vance	5,577	18.06
Independent	Ann Stasiuk	475	1.54
Total valid votes		30,881	99.35
Total rejected, unmarked, and declined ballots		203	0.65
Turnout		31,084	64.32
Eligible voters		48,325	
Source: Elections Ontario
