= Ed Doyle (politician) =

Canadian politician (1935–2026)

Ontario MPP
- In office 1995–1999
- Preceded by: Mark Morrow
- Succeeded by: Riding abolished
- Constituency: Wentworth East

Personal details
- Born: November 30, 1935 Franquelin, Quebec, Canada
- Died: January 22, 2026 (aged 90) Hamilton, Ontario, Canada
- Party: Progressive Conservative
- Occupation: Journalist

Edward Doyle (November 30, 1935 – January 22, 2026) was a Canadian politician in Ontario. He was a Progressive Conservative member of the Legislative Assembly of Ontario from 1995 to 1999.

== Background ==
Doyle was educated in Montreal, and did not attend university. He worked as a radio and television news journalist in Montreal, Kitchener and Hamilton, and was a member of the Experimental Aircraft Association.

Doyle died in Hamilton on January 22, 2026, at the age of 90.

== Politics ==
Doyle was elected to the Ontario legislature in the Hamilton-area riding of Wentworth East in the 1995 provincial election, defeating Liberal Shirley Collins and incumbent New Democrat Mark Morrow by a plurality of about 3,606 votes. He served for the next four years as a backbench supporter of Mike Harris's government. He did play a major role in parliament; he stood in as speaker of the assembly from September 26 to October 2, 1996, after the resignation of Al McLean.

He did not support amalgamating the city of Hamilton, and co-chaired a series of provincial consultations on the Canada Pension Plan in 1996. Doyle did not seek re-election in 1999.
