= Marion Boyd =

Canadian politician (1946–2022)

Ontario MPP
- In office 1990–1999
- Preceded by: David Peterson
- Succeeded by: Riding abolished
- Constituency: London Centre

Minister of Justice and Attorney General of Ontario
- In office February 3, 1993 – June 26, 1995
- Premier: Bob Rae
- Preceded by: Howard Hampton
- Succeeded by: Charles Harnick

Personal details
- Born: Phyllis Marion Watt; March 26, 1946 Toronto, Ontario, Canada
- Died: October 11, 2022 (aged 76) Inverhuron, Ontario, Canada
- Party: New Democrat
- Occupation: Mediator

Phyllis Marion Boyd (née Watt; March 26, 1946 – October 11, 2022) was a Canadian politician in Ontario. She was a New Democratic member of the Legislative Assembly of Ontario from 1990 to 1999 who represented the riding of London Centre. She served as a member of cabinet in the government of Bob Rae.

== Early life ==
Boyd was born in Toronto on March 26, 1946, to Bill and Dorothy Watt. She studied at Glendon College, graduating with a Bachelor of Arts in English and history in 1968. From 1968 to 1973, she worked as an assistant to the president of York University. In 1975–76, she helped faculty members of York University win their first union contract. She subsequently worked as an executive director of the London Battered Women's Advocacy Clinic, and served two terms as president of the London Status of Women Action Group. She was widely known as a feminist.

== Politics ==
In 1985, Boyd was the NDP candidate in London North in the provincial election of 1985, but finished third against incumbent Liberal Ron Van Horne. She ran in London Centre in the 1987 election, and lost to sitting Premier David Peterson by almost 9,000 votes. She campaigned as a federal New Democrat in the 1988 general election, finished third behind Liberal Joe Fontana and Progressive Conservative Jim Jepson in London East.

Boyd sought a rematch against Peterson in the 1990 provincial election. This time she won, defeating the Premier by more than 8,000 votes. It was almost unheard of for a provincial premier to be defeated in his own riding, and the size of Boyd's victory was all the more surprising. The NDP won the election, and the new Premier, Bob Rae, appointed her as Minister of Education on October 1, 1990.

When fellow cabinet member Anne Swarbrick resigned due to health issues, Boyd took over responsibility for Women's Issues on September 11, 1991. Boyd launched a high-profile campaign against domestic abuse in the same year. She was transferred to the Ministry of Community and Social Services on October 15, 1991, when Zanana Akande resigned due to a conflict of interest.

Boyd was promoted to Attorney General of Ontario on February 3, 1993, the first woman to hold that position as well as the first non-lawyer. In this capacity she was responsible for the Equality Rights Statute Amendment Act (Bill 167), that would have provided same-sex couples with rights and obligations mostly equal to those of opposite-sex common law couples. The bill failed on a free vote when twelve NDP members voted with the opposition parties against the bill. The bill's failure was a personal disappointment for Boyd, who had invested considerable effort in promoting its passage. The Progressive Conservative Party, which voted unanimously against Bill 167, formed government after the next election and ultimately passed similar legislation five years later when required by the Supreme Court of Canada's ruling in M v H.

Boyd also approved a highly controversial plea-bargain deal that allowed serial killer Karla Homolka to receive a 12-year prison sentence in return for testimony which led to the conviction of Homolka's then-husband, Paul Bernardo. The deal was criticized in much of the Canadian media, and many questioned Boyd's judgment in the matter. At the time the extent of Homolka's personal involvement in Bernardo's crimes was not known.

Boyd remained as Attorney General until the Rae government was defeated in the 1995 election. She was one of seventeen NDP MPPs to successfully retain their seats in that election, defeating PC candidate Patrick McGuinness by 1,732 votes. Boyd remained a high-profile MPP, serving as the NDP's Health Critic from 1997 to 1999.

The London Centre riding was eliminated by redistribution in 1996. Boyd ran against fellow incumbent Dianne Cunningham of the Progressive Conservative Party in London North Centre, and lost by just over 1,700 votes.

Under the Liberals, the next Attorney General Michael Bryant placed her to review the province's arbitration schemes, particularly sharia. However this did not end up going through.

=== Cabinet positions ===
Rae ministry, Province of Ontario (1990–1995)
Cabinet posts (3)
Predecessor	Office	Successor
Howard Hampton	Attorney General; 1993–1995 also named Minister of Justice and Responsible for Women's Issues	Charles Harnick
Zanana Akande	Minister of Community and Social Services; 1991–1993; Also Responsible for Women's Issues	Tony Silipo
Sean Conway	Minister of Education; 1990–1991	Tony Silipo

== Electoral record (Federal) ==
=== London East ===
1988 Canadian federal election
Party	Candidate	Votes	%	±%
Liberal	Joe Fontana	19,547	37.7%	+11.8%
Progressive Conservative	Jim Jepson	19,445	37.5%	−9.7%
New Democratic	Marion Boyd	12,667	24.4%	−2.5%
Independent	Peter Ewart	201	0.4%	+0.4%

== Electoral record (provincial) ==
=== London North ===
1985 Ontario general election
Party	Candidate	Votes	%	±%
Liberal	Ronald Van Horne	20,536	54.4%	+4.8%
Progressive Conservative	George Auold	11,433	30.3%	−7.7%
New Democratic	Marion Boyd	5,191	13.8%	+1.4%
Freedom	Robert Smeenk	566	1.5%	+1.5%

=== London Centre ===
1987 Ontario general election
Party	Candidate	Votes	%	±%
Liberal	David Peterson	18,194	55.2%	+0.4%
New Democratic	Marion Boyd	9,266	28.1%	+11.0%
Progressive Conservative	Dennis McKaig	3,864	11.7%	−14.8%
Family Coalition	Brenda Rowe	695	2.1%	+2.1%
Freedom	Lloyd Walker	589	1.8%	+0.2%
Independent	Stunning Bentley	375	1.1%	+1.1%

1990 Ontario general election
Party	Candidate	Votes	%	±%
New Democratic	Marion Boyd	17,837	51.3%	+23.2%
Liberal	David Peterson	9,671	27.8%	−27.4%
Progressive Conservative	Mark Handelman	5,348	15.4%	+3.7%
Family Coalition	John Van Geldersen	982	2.8%	+0.7%
Freedom	Lloyd Walker	589	1.4%	−0.4%
Independent	Terry Smart	375	0.8%	+0.8%
Communist	Issam Mansour	84	0.2%	+0.2%
Independent	Sidney Tarleton	73	0.2%	+0.2%

1995 Ontario general election
Party	Candidate	Votes	%	±%
New Democratic	Marion Boyd	11,096	36.8%	−14.5%
Progressive Conservative	Patrick McGuinness	9,364	31.0%	+15.6%
Liberal	Ron Postian	7,559	25.1%	−2.7%
Family Coalition	Mike Dwyer	1,041	3.5%	+0.7%
Green	Jeff Culbert	533	1.8%	+1.8%
Freedom	Lloyd Walker	452	1.5%	+0.1%
Natural Law	Liz Overall	134	0.4%	+0.4%

=== London North Centre ===
1999 Ontario general election
Party	Candidate	Votes	%	±%
Progressive Conservative	Dianne Cunningham	18,320	40.2	
New Democratic	Marion Boyd	16,611	36.5	
Liberal	Roger Caranci	9,518	20.9	
Family Coalition	Andrew Jezierski	466	1.0	
Green	Jeff Culbert	366	0.8	
Freedom	Robert Metz	156	0.3	
Natural Law	Stephen Porter	120	0.3	
Total valid votes		45,557	100	

== After politics ==
Boyd was appointed chair to the Task Force on the Health Effects of Woman Abuse in 2000. It was convened in response to the problem of domestic violence against women. Later that year the task force produced a report with 29 recommendations. The key conclusion was that doctors should begin screening female patients as young as 12 years old for signs of abuse.

In December 2003, it came to light that religious tribunals had some legal basis under the Arbitration Act. Some argued that this interpretation allowed for Muslim Sharia law to be applied in settling family disputes. In the spring of 2004, the issue flared up even more with some claiming that the use of Sharia law tribunals was infringing on the rights of Muslim women. In the summer of 2004, Premier Dalton McGuinty asked Boyd to investigate the issue.

In December 2004, Boyd released a report that found no evidence of complaints with regards to faith-based arbitration. She concluded that no changes to the act were needed with respect to religious tribunals. She made 46 recommendations for changes to the Arbitration Act primarily dealing with arbitrator training and clarifying the roles and responsibilities of tribunals. In 2005, in response to public opinion, McGuinty ignored Boyd's main conclusion and tabled changes to the act under the Family Statute Law Amendment Act.

While incorporating many of Boyd's recommendations, the act specifically removed any legal status for the arbitration of custodial and marital disputes by religious tribunals. The act mandated that all family law arbitrations in Ontario be conducted only in accordance with Canadian law. Some critics argued that this was a missed opportunity to incorporate aspects of Islamic law into the Canadian judicial system.

Boyd died in Inverhuron, Ontario on October 11, 2022, at the age of 76.
