= 1995 Ontario general election =

Canadian provincial election

- June 8, 1995

130 seats in the 36th Legislative Assembly of Ontario 66 seats needed for a majority
- Turnout: 63.00% (▼1.45pp)
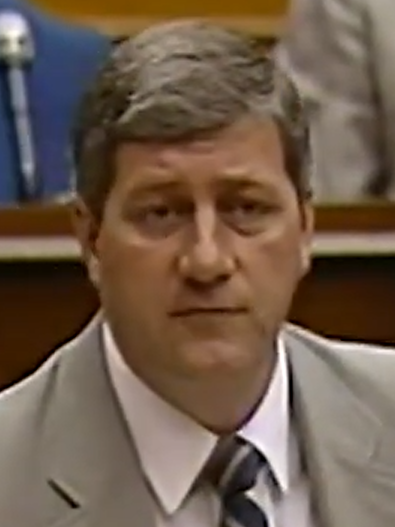

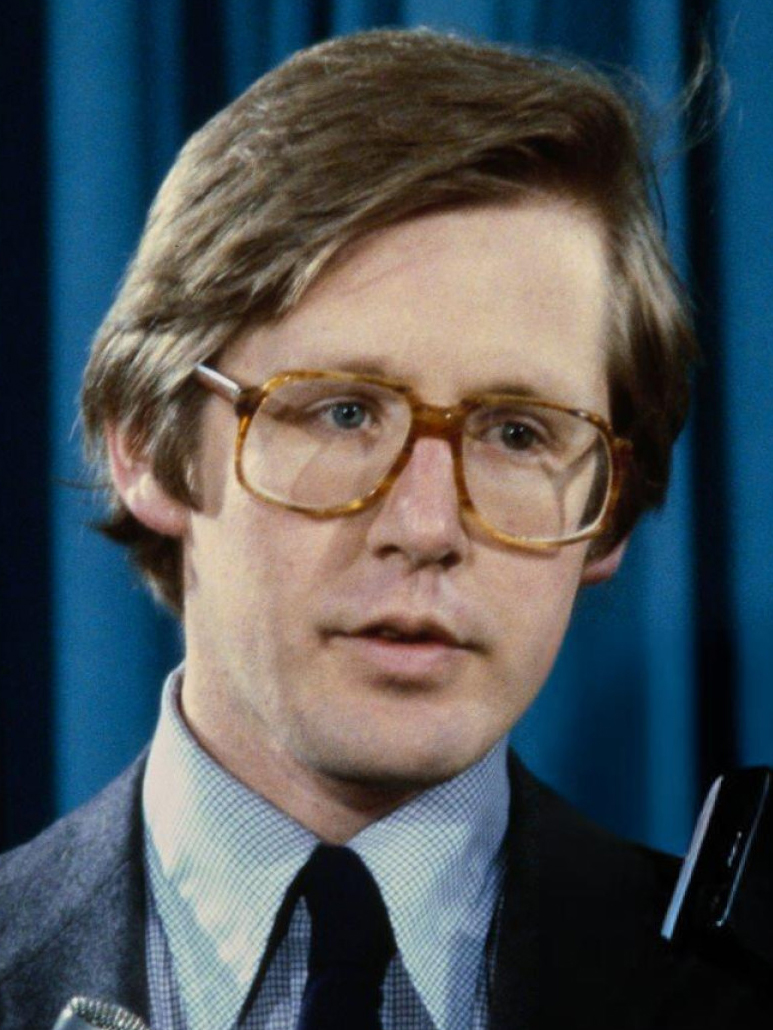
	First party	Second party	Third party
Leader	Mike Harris	Lyn McLeod	Bob Rae
Party	Progressive Conservative	Liberal	New Democratic
Leader since	May 12, 1990	February 9, 1992	February 7, 1982
Leader's seat	Nipissing	Fort William	York South
Last election	20	36	74
Seats won	82	30	17
Seat change	▲62	▼6	▼57
Popular vote	1,870,110	1,291,326	854,163
Percentage	44.8%	31.1%	20.6%
Swing	▲21.3pp	▼1.3pp	▼17.0pp
- Popular vote by riding. As this is an FPTP election, seat totals are not determined by popular vote, but instead via results by each riding. Click the map for more details.
Premier before election
Bob Rae
New Democratic
Premier after election
Mike Harris
Progressive Conservative

General elections were held on June 8, 1995, to elect members of the 36th Legislative Assembly of the province of Ontario, Canada. The writs for the election were drawn up on April 28, 1995.

The governing New Democratic Party, led by Premier Bob Rae, was defeated by voters, who were angry with the actions of the Rae government, such as its unpopular hiring quotas and the Social Contract legislation in 1993. These policies caused the NDP to lose much of its base in organized labour, further reducing support for the party. At the 1993 federal election, the NDP tumbled to less than seven per cent support, and lost all 11 of its federal seats in Ontario. By the time the writs were drawn up for the 1995 provincial election, it was obvious that the NDP would not be reelected.

== Riding name change ==
Acts were passed in 1991 and 1993, providing for the following name changes to ridings:

- Stormont, Dundas and Glengarry to S-D-G & East Grenville.
- Grey to Grey—Owen Sound.
- York North to York—Mackenzie.

== Campaign ==
The Liberal Party under Lyn McLeod had been leading in the polls for most of the period from 1992 to 1995, and were generally favoured to benefit from the swing in support away from the NDP. However, the party hurt its credibility through a series of high-profile policy reversals in the period leading up to the election. The most notable of these occurred when McLeod withdrew Liberal support from the Equality Rights Statute Amendment Act (Bill 167) introduced by the NDP government in 1994, which would have provided same-sex couples with rights and obligations mostly equal to those of opposite-sex common law couples and introduced a form of civil unions. Her decision was seen as cynical and opportunistic in light of the Liberals' earlier rural by-election loss in the socially conservative riding of Victoria—Haliburton. This gave the McLeod Liberals a reputation for "flip-flopping" and inconsistency while offending its socially progressive supporters.

The Progressive Conservative Party, led by Mike Harris, found success with its Common Sense Revolution campaign to cut personal income taxes, social assistance (welfare) rates, and government spending dramatically. Roughly half of his party's seats came from the more affluent regions of the Greater Toronto Area (GTA), especially the suburban belt surrounding Metro Toronto, often called the '905' for its telephone area code.

In addition, by presenting himself as a populist, representing "ordinary Ontarians" over "special interests", Harris was able to build Tory support among working-class voters. Although there were regional variations, many working-class voters shifted directly from the NDP to the Tories during the election, enabling the latter to win formerly NDP ridings such as Cambridge and Oshawa.

The televised party leaders' debate is often regarded as the turning point of the campaign. During the event, McLeod further alienated many voters with an overly aggressive performance. Harris used his time to speak directly to the camera to convey his party's Common Sense Revolution platform, virtually ignoring all questions asked of him by Rae and McLeod and avoiding getting caught up in their debate. Since Liberal support was regarded by many political insiders as soft and unsteady, many voters who were previously leaning to the Liberals shifted to the Progressive Conservatives after the debate.

== Opinion polls ==
Evolution of voting intentions at provincial level
Polling firm	Last day of survey	Source	PCO	OLP	ONDP	Other	ME	Sample
Election 1995	June 8, 1995		44.8	31.1	20.6	3.5		
Gallup	June 4, 1995		42	35	20	—N/a	3.1	—N/a
Angus Reid	May 1995		44	34	20	—N/a	3.2	1,000
Angus Reid	May 1995		41	36	21	—N/a	3.2	1,000
	May 24, 1995		37	33	~25	—N/a	—N/a	400
Compas	May 1995		36	40	21	—N/a	4.5	507
Environics	May 1995		26	52	17	—N/a	3	—N/a
Election called (April 28, 1995)

=== During the 35th Parliament of Ontario ===
Evolution of voting intentions at provincial level
Polling firm	Last day of survey	Source	PCO	OLP	ONDP	Other	ME	Sample
Angus Reid	April 1995		28	46	21	—N/a	—N/a	—N/a
Comquest Research	March 1995		30	34	36	—N/a	—N/a	—N/a
Angus Reid	January 1995		27	45	20	9	4.5	1,007
Environics	June 25, 1992		28	42	25	—N/a	3.2	1,000
Environics	March 1992		28	43	23	—N/a	—N/a	—N/a
Environics	June 1991		23	36	34	—N/a	—N/a	—N/a
Environics	December 30, 1990		15	24	58	—N/a	3.2	1,030
Environics	October 1990		18	27	51	—N/a	3.2	1,007
Election 1990	September 6, 1990		23.5	32.4	37.6	6.5		

== Results ==
=== Summary ===
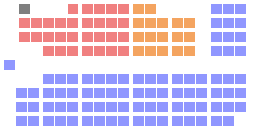
The Ontario Legislature after the 1995 election.

The Progressive Conservatives won a majority while the Liberals finished with less support than they had in the 1990 election. The NDP, despite improving their standing in some Northern Ontario ridings, were heavily defeated, falling to 17 seats and third party status. The New Democrats would remain the third party until 2018 when they returned to Official Opposition status. McLeod and Rae resigned their party leadership posts not long after the campaign. It was also the worst result for an incumbent Ontario governing party up to that time and would remain so until 2018 when the NDP finally surpassed the then-governing Liberals.

One independent candidate was elected: Peter North in the riding of Elgin. North had been elected in 1990 as a New Democrat, but left the NDP and declared his intention to run as a Progressive Conservative. The PC Party did not accept him as a candidate, however.

At least five unregistered parties fielded candidates in this election, appearing on the ballot as independents:

- The Reform Association of Ontario ran fifteen candidates. Their leader was Kimble Ainslie. An article of The Globe and Mail for August 19, 1995 indicates that the party won 6,400 votes.
- John Steele campaigned as a candidate of the Communist League.
- The Ontario Renewal Party ran a number of candidates under the leadership of Diane Johnston. This was the Marxist–Leninist party under a different name.
- Amani Oakley and Joe Flexer ran as "Independent Labour" candidates in Toronto with the support of dissident or former members of the Ontario New Democratic Party and with the support of OPSEU in the case of Oakley and the Canadian Auto Workers in the case of Flexer .
- John Turmel's Abolitionist Party ran at least two candidates.

=== Overall ===
Elections to the 36th Parliament of Ontario (1995)
Political party	Party leader	MPPs				Votes			
Political party	Party leader	Candidates	1990	1995	±	#	±	%	± (pp)
Progressive Conservative	Mike Harris	130	20	82	62▲	1,870,110	925,546▲	44.97%	21.46▲
Liberal	Lyn McLeod	130	36	30	6▼	1,291,326	10,808▼	31.05%	1.35▼
New Democratic	Bob Rae	130	74	17	57▼	854,163	655,343▼	20.54%	17.03▼
Independent		60	–	1	1▲	33,077	19,770▲	0.80%	0.46▲
Family Coalition	Donald Pennell	55	–	–	–	61,657	49,174▼	1.48%	1.28▼
Natural Law	Ron Parker	68	–	–	–	18,326	18,326▲	0.44%	New
Green	Frank de Jong	37	–	–	–	14,108	15,989▼	0.34%	0.41▼
Libertarian	John Shadbolt	18	–	–	–	6,085	18,528▼	0.15%	0.47▼
Freedom	Jack Plant	12	–	–	–	4,532	1,483▼	0.11%	0.04▼
Confederation of Regions		6	–	–	–	3,971	71,902▼	0.10%	1.79▼
Communist	Darrell Rankin	5	–	–	–	1,015	124▼	0.02%	–
Total		651	130	130		4,158,370		100.00%	
Rejected ballots						42,152	10,423▼		
Voter turnout						4,200,522	129,868▲	63.00	1.45▼
Registered electors						6,667,798	351,849▲		

=== Vote and seat summaries ===
Ternary plots - shift of electoral support (1990-1995)
1990

1995
Electoral districts identified by colours of winning parties

Seats and popular vote by party
Party	Seats	Votes	Change (pp)
█ Progressive Conservative	82 / 130	44.97%	21.46
█ Liberal	30 / 130	31.05%	-1.35
█ New Democratic	17 / 130	20.54%	-17.03
█ Independent	1 / 130	0.80%	0.46
█ Family Coalition	0 / 130	1.48%	-1.28
█ Confederation of Regions	0 / 130	0.10%	-1.79
█ Other	0 / 130	1.06%	-0.47

=== Synopsis of results ===
Results by riding - 1995 Ontario general election
Riding	Winning party								Turnout (Note: including spoilt ballots)	Votes (Note: minor political parties receiving less than 1% of the popular vote are aggregated under "Other"; independent candidates are aggregated separately)						
Name (Note: order is as given in EO reports) (Note: Names are as specified in 1976 Act plus 1990 amendment - EO file has errors)	1990	1st place	Votes	Share	Margin #	Margin %	2nd place	3rd place	Turnout	PC	Lib	NDP	FCP	Ind	Other	Total
Algoma	NDP	NDP	6,190	44.47%	1,588	11.41%	PC	Lib	64.02%	4,602	3,128	6,190	–	–	–	13,920
Algoma—Manitoulin	Lib	Lib	7,238	46.96%	2,054	13.33%	PC	NDP	59.33%	5,184	7,238	2,991	–	–	–	15,413
Beaches—Woodbine	NDP	NDP	10,862	42.44%	2,939	11.48%	PC	Lib	67.14%	7,923	6,158	10,862	–	319	331	25,593
Brampton North	Lib	PC	20,148	49.47%	5,348	13.13%	Lib	NDP	59.17%	20,148	14,800	5,288	–	–	494	40,730
Brampton South	Lib	PC	21,859	49.67%	6,622	15.05%	Lib	NDP	59.78%	21,859	15,237	5,676	1,011	–	229	44,012
Brantford	NDP	PC	13,745	41.01%	3,327	9.93%	Lib	NDP	59.90%	13,745	10,418	8,165	762	–	430	33,520
Brant—Haldimand	Lib	PC	14,184	47.81%	3,595	12.12%	Lib	NDP	61.67%	14,184	10,589	3,030	1,340	–	527	29,670
Bruce	Lib	PC	13,680	42.70%	2,676	8.35%	Lib	NDP	69.34%	13,680	11,004	4,269	2,787	–	296	32,036
Burlington South	PC	PC	24,831	72.56%	19,416	56.73%	Lib	NDP	69.20%	24,831	5,415	3,507	470	–	–	34,223
Cambridge	NDP	PC	17,269	46.93%	5,472	14.87%	NDP	Lib	59.56%	17,269	5,606	11,797	1,690	433	–	36,795
Carleton	PC	PC	28,349	64.96%	18,606	42.64%	Lib	NDP	62.05%	28,349	9,743	4,046	942	–	558	43,638
Carleton East	Lib	Lib	17,780	48.19%	4,209	11.41%	PC	NDP	60.34%	13,571	17,780	4,783	–	–	758	36,892
Chatham—Kent	NDP	PC	10,461	36.29%	546	1.89%	Lib	NDP	58.54%	10,461	9,915	7,444	1,008	–	–	28,828
Cochrane North	NDP	NDP	6,935	45.62%	1,983	13.04%	Lib	PC	58.96%	3,316	4,952	6,935	–	–	–	15,203
Cochrane South	NDP	NDP	12,114	52.45%	5,527	23.93%	PC	Lib	60.36%	6,587	4,058	12,114	–	339	–	23,098
Cornwall	Lib	Lib	14,507	59.70%	6,669	27.44%	PC	NDP	55.53%	7,838	14,507	1,719	–	–	236	24,300
Don Mills	NDP	PC	14,897	53.36%	7,290	26.11%	Lib	NDP	66.09%	14,897	7,607	4,569	–	362	484	27,919
Dovercourt	NDP	NDP	9,049	47.23%	3,488	18.20%	Lib	PC	63.22%	3,560	5,561	9,049	–	261	730	19,161
Downsview	NDP	Lib	9,142	39.48%	360	1.55%	NDP	PC	63.90%	4,444	9,142	8,782	–	572	217	23,157
Dufferin—Peel	PC	PC	23,239	66.00%	14,738	41.86%	Lib	NDP	65.37%	23,239	8,501	3,470	–	–	–	35,210
Durham Centre	NDP	PC	25,107	58.34%	15,299	35.55%	Lib	NDP	65.02%	25,107	9,808	8,120	–	–	–	43,035
Durham East	NDP	PC	24,303	61.79%	15,784	40.13%	NDP	Lib	63.79%	24,303	6,512	8,519	–	–	–	39,334
Durham West	NDP	PC	29,232	54.58%	15,258	28.49%	Lib	NDP	63.83%	29,232	13,974	9,444	–	904	–	53,554
Durham—York	NDP	PC	25,018	60.40%	16,970	40.97%	NDP	Lib	63.45%	25,018	7,512	8,048	845	–	–	41,423
Eglinton	Lib	PC	17,496	48.82%	4,592	12.81%	Lib	NDP	73.65%	17,496	12,904	4,597	–	123	720	35,840
Elgin	NDP	Ind	12,436	37.79%	1,776	5.40%	PC	Lib	61.17%	10,660	5,801	3,445	–	12,436	565	32,907
Essex-Kent	NDP	Lib	10,130	37.01%	1,746	6.38%	PC	NDP	58.85%	8,384	10,130	7,837	1,022	–	–	27,373
Essex South	Lib	Lib	14,513	54.48%	8,783	32.97%	PC	NDP	50.91%	5,730	14,513	4,348	1,550	–	498	26,639
Etobicoke—Humber	Lib	PC	18,128	51.26%	4,494	12.71%	Lib	NDP	73.35%	18,128	13,634	3,100	–	308	196	35,366
Etobicoke—Lakeshore	NDP	PC	14,879	45.23%	5,805	17.65%	Lib	NDP	66.55%	14,879	9,074	8,279	–	186	479	32,897
Etobicoke—Rexdale	NDP	PC	9,521	36.57%	853	3.28%	NDP	Lib	59.51%	9,521	7,173	8,668	–	488	188	26,038
Etobicoke West	PC	PC	18,349	55.30%	8,523	25.69%	Lib	NDP	70.68%	18,349	9,826	4,608	–	–	399	33,182
Fort William	Lib	Lib	15,681	57.32%	8,565	31.31%	PC	NDP	63.29%	7,116	15,681	4,561	–	–	–	27,358
Fort York	NDP	NDP	10,762	41.02%	2,280	8.69%	Lib	PC	64.86%	6,025	8,482	10,762	–	269	699	26,237
Frontenac—Addington	NDP	PC	12,211	38.52%	1,962	6.19%	Lib	NDP	62.52%	12,211	10,249	7,302	1,404	416	121	31,703
Grey—Owen Sound	PC	PC	25,138	63.21%	16,876	42.44%	Lib	NDP	65.58%	25,138	8,262	3,413	2,082	703	170	39,768
Guelph	NDP	PC	17,204	42.55%	5,745	14.21%	Lib	NDP	66.31%	17,204	11,459	10,278	1,035	187	265	40,428
Halton Centre	Lib	PC	30,621	61.41%	16,644	33.38%	Lib	NDP	69.06%	30,621	13,977	5,268	–	–	–	49,866
Halton North	NDP	PC	19,247	60.90%	12,679	40.12%	Lib	NDP	66.58%	19,247	6,568	4,362	1,239	–	187	31,603
Hamilton Centre	NDP	NDP	8,012	36.81%	690	3.17%	Lib	PC	54.71%	5,723	7,322	8,012	376	–	331	21,764
Hamilton East	NDP	Lib	11,088	43.55%	4,046	15.89%	NDP	PC	57.85%	6,263	11,088	7,042	681	–	389	25,463
Hamilton Mountain	NDP	PC	13,852	36.60%	1,028	2.72%	Lib	NDP	64.41%	13,852	12,824	9,837	1,329	–	–	37,842
Hamilton West	NDP	PC	13,301	40.54%	4,034	12.29%	NDP	Lib	67.00%	13,301	8,911	9,267	880	–	453	32,812
Hastings—Peterborough	NDP	PC	16,187	54.17%	7,859	26.30%	NDP	Lib	67.44%	16,187	4,056	8,328	1,002	–	308	29,881
High Park—Swansea	NDP	PC	10,559	38.77%	1,660	6.10%	NDP	Lib	70.36%	10,559	7,121	8,899	–	–	654	27,233
Huron	NDP	PC	13,343	46.16%	6,334	21.91%	Lib	NDP	70.00%	13,343	7,009	6,927	1,418	207	–	28,904
Kenora	Lib	Lib	9,152	53.72%	4,055	23.80%	PC	NDP	52.02%	5,097	9,152	2,788	–	–	–	17,037
Kingston and the Islands	NDP	Lib	10,314	36.90%	1,743	6.24%	PC	NDP	61.08%	8,571	10,314	8,052	858	–	155	27,950
Kitchener	NDP	PC	13,374	40.15%	3,382	10.15%	Lib	NDP	60.12%	13,374	9,992	6,998	2,111	835	–	33,310
Kitchener—Wilmot	NDP	PC	17,392	45.70%	7,286	19.14%	Lib	NDP	59.07%	17,392	10,106	8,146	2,415	–	–	38,059
Lake Nipigon	NDP	NDP	5,079	42.99%	1,616	13.68%	Lib	PC	54.99%	3,273	3,463	5,079	–	–	–	11,815
Lambton	NDP	PC	12,034	43.58%	4,109	14.88%	Lib	NDP	64.70%	12,034	7,925	5,055	2,184	–	417	27,615
Lanark—Renfrew	PC	PC	19,959	55.79%	10,003	27.96%	Lib	NDP	59.87%	19,959	9,956	3,455	745	557	1,104	35,776
Lawrence	Lib	Lib	11,784	45.88%	3,829	14.91%	PC	NDP	65.08%	7,955	11,784	5,000	–	–	944	25,683
Leeds—Grenville	PC	PC	21,763	63.27%	12,808	37.23%	Lib	NDP	63.06%	21,763	8,955	2,316	–	438	927	34,399
Lincoln	NDP	PC	18,709	50.68%	7,833	21.22%	Lib	NDP	68.09%	18,709	10,876	5,800	1,241	–	288	36,914
London Centre	NDP	NDP	11,096	36.77%	1,732	5.74%	PC	Lib	53.26%	9,364	7,559	11,096	1,041	–	1,119	30,179
London North	PC	PC	23,195	52.65%	12,083	27.43%	Lib	NDP	64.73%	23,195	11,112	8,167	777	–	800	44,051
London South	NDP	PC	18,161	44.35%	7,432	18.15%	NDP	Lib	61.88%	18,161	10,693	10,729	387	323	653	40,946
Markham	PC	PC	37,314	64.81%	26,544	46.10%	Lib	NDP	62.80%	37,314	10,770	7,779	1,088	–	626	57,577
Middlesex	NDP	PC	15,684	40.35%	5,236	13.47%	Lib	NDP	64.67%	15,684	10,448	8,799	3,481	–	458	38,870
Mississauga East	Lib	PC	16,468	52.07%	6,429	20.33%	Lib	NDP	60.38%	16,468	10,039	5,120	–	–	–	31,627
Mississauga North	Lib	PC	22,095	47.76%	4,414	9.54%	Lib	NDP	57.37%	22,095	17,681	5,283	–	–	1,206	46,265
Mississauga South	PC	PC	23,116	69.76%	17,565	53.01%	Lib	NDP	65.39%	23,116	5,551	3,282	–	596	590	33,135
Mississauga West	Lib	PC	26,614	46.21%	3,339	5.80%	Lib	NDP	60.33%	26,614	23,275	6,758	–	–	952	57,599
Muskoka—Georgian Bay	NDP	PC	17,864	51.79%	9,769	28.32%	Lib	NDP	65.50%	17,864	8,095	7,742	–	381	411	34,493
Nepean	Lib	PC	17,510	49.66%	3,935	11.16%	Lib	NDP	64.97%	17,510	13,575	3,274	–	–	901	35,260
Niagara Falls	NDP	PC	12,132	43.33%	3,843	13.73%	Lib	NDP	59.48%	12,132	8,289	7,034	–	189	355	27,999
Niagara South	NDP	PC	8,815	38.24%	1,181	5.12%	Lib	NDP	60.14%	8,815	7,634	5,376	536	688	–	23,049
Nickel Belt	NDP	NDP	8,007	46.54%	2,458	14.29%	Lib	PC	64.70%	3,305	5,549	8,007	–	225	119	17,205
Nipissing	PC	PC	18,722	60.48%	10,837	35.01%	Lib	NDP	63.68%	18,722	7,885	4,350	–	–	–	30,957
Norfolk	NDP	PC	17,335	48.68%	7,922	22.24%	Lib	NDP	64.14%	17,335	9,413	7,893	972	–	–	35,613
Northumberland	Lib	PC	19,359	52.14%	6,126	16.50%	Lib	NDP	67.13%	19,359	13,233	4,539	–	–	–	37,131
Oakville South	PC	PC	21,689	63.34%	13,210	38.58%	Lib	NDP	71.08%	21,689	8,479	2,973	1,103	–	–	34,244
Oakwood	NDP	Lib	8,599	42.31%	975	4.80%	NDP	PC	65.74%	3,298	8,599	7,624	–	301	504	20,326
Oriole	Lib	Lib	11,164	43.70%	1,034	4.05%	PC	NDP	68.39%	10,130	11,164	3,665	–	243	342	25,544
Oshawa	NDP	PC	16,793	54.33%	8,343	26.99%	NDP	Lib	57.66%	16,793	5,666	8,450	–	–	–	30,909
Ottawa Centre	NDP	Lib	11,150	39.26%	1,712	6.03%	NDP	PC	63.88%	6,715	11,150	9,438	–	173	924	28,400
Ottawa East	Lib	Lib	14,436	56.94%	9,068	35.77%	PC	NDP	53.21%	5,368	14,436	4,818	–	136	596	25,354
Ottawa—Rideau	Lib	PC	14,796	45.11%	1,523	4.64%	Lib	NDP	61.29%	14,796	13,273	4,138	–	–	590	32,797
Ottawa South	Lib	Lib	15,418	53.35%	6,800	23.53%	PC	NDP	66.51%	8,618	15,418	4,235	–	–	628	28,899
Ottawa West	Lib	Lib	14,516	45.48%	1,618	5.07%	PC	NDP	64.43%	12,898	14,516	3,718	–	241	544	31,917
Oxford	NDP	PC	17,568	49.48%	8,067	22.72%	NDP	Lib	64.02%	17,568	6,564	9,501	1,061	–	809	35,503
Parkdale	Lib	Lib	8,435	47.87%	2,640	14.98%	NDP	PC	64.03%	2,887	8,435	5,795	–	–	505	17,622
Parry Sound	PC	PC	15,523	65.47%	10,702	45.14%	Lib	NDP	63.57%	15,523	4,821	3,367	–	–	–	23,711
Perth	NDP	PC	13,735	44.81%	5,290	17.26%	NDP	Lib	62.90%	13,735	7,722	8,445	–	326	427	30,655
Peterborough	NDP	PC	22,735	52.66%	12,409	28.74%	Lib	NDP	66.23%	22,735	10,326	7,581	2,064	–	464	43,170
Port Arthur	NDP	Lib	14,281	48.92%	6,791	23.26%	NDP	PC	61.91%	6,554	14,281	7,490	683	182	–	29,190
Prescott and Russell	Lib	Lib	24,808	55.68%	11,171	25.07%	PC	NDP	56.64%	13,637	24,808	4,472	–	564	1,072	44,553
Prince Edward—Lennox—South Hastings	NDP	PC	14,144	49.61%	6,346	22.26%	Lib	NDP	60.04%	14,144	7,798	5,996	–	–	571	28,509
Quinte	Lib	PC	13,961	47.28%	2,135	7.23%	Lib	NDP	58.79%	13,961	11,826	3,743	–	–	–	29,530
Rainy River	NDP	NDP	4,912	39.93%	205	1.67%	PC	Lib	63.98%	4,707	2,683	4,912	–	–	–	12,302
Renfrew North	Lib	Lib	16,044	53.32%	6,363	21.15%	PC	NDP	61.00%	9,681	16,044	2,483	1,695	–	187	30,090
Riverdale	NDP	NDP	10,948	46.88%	4,600	19.70%	PC	Lib	64.66%	6,348	5,443	10,948	–	273	341	23,353
St. Andrew—St. Patrick	NDP	PC	13,092	40.43%	3,679	11.36%	Lib	NDP	67.16%	13,092	9,413	9,231	–	–	649	32,385
St. Catharines	Lib	Lib	13,761	46.53%	2,275	7.69%	PC	NDP	64.58%	11,486	13,761	3,929	245	–	153	29,574
St. Catharines—Brock	NDP	PC	11,976	47.02%	4,603	18.07%	Lib	NDP	62.56%	11,976	7,373	5,521	598	–	–	25,468
St. George—St. David	Lib	PC	10,662	33.87%	337	1.07%	Lib	NDP	70.61%	10,662	10,325	9,672	–	424	392	31,475
Sarnia	NDP	PC	9,260	33.81%	634	2.31%	Lib	NDP	61.31%	9,260	8,626	7,487	1,642	376	–	27,391
Sault Ste. Marie	NDP	NDP	15,392	43.33%	3,720	10.47%	Lib	PC	62.24%	7,699	11,672	15,392	–	–	757	35,520
Scarborough—Agincourt	Lib	Lib	13,472	46.08%	2,135	7.30%	PC	NDP	61.37%	11,337	13,472	4,112	–	–	313	29,234
Scarborough Centre	NDP	PC	12,717	45.88%	5,554	20.04%	Lib	NDP	63.35%	12,717	7,163	6,841	–	649	349	27,719
Scarborough East	NDP	PC	19,166	55.72%	11,954	34.75%	NDP	Lib	64.69%	19,166	7,197	7,212	–	270	553	34,398
Scarborough—Ellesmere	NDP	PC	13,282	47.89%	5,376	19.38%	NDP	Lib	64.95%	13,282	5,602	7,906	–	–	947	27,737
Scarborough North	Lib	Lib	15,507	46.08%	4,999	14.85%	PC	NDP	58.67%	10,508	15,507	6,431	369	–	840	33,655
Scarborough West	NDP	PC	11,773	43.13%	2,557	9.37%	NDP	Lib	64.33%	11,773	5,326	9,216	–	254	730	27,299
Simcoe Centre	NDP	PC	29,790	58.25%	17,729	34.67%	Lib	NDP	63.06%	29,790	12,061	7,655	769	284	580	51,139
Simcoe East	PC	PC	23,489	60.97%	14,445	37.50%	Lib	NDP	66.52%	23,489	9,044	4,849	–	876	266	38,524
Simcoe West	PC	PC	24,346	68.24%	18,847	52.83%	Lib	NDP	63.01%	24,346	5,499	4,937	894	–	–	35,676
S-D-G & East Grenville	PC	PC	18,884	64.69%	11,290	38.68%	Lib	NDP	62.48%	18,884	7,594	2,285	–	–	428	29,191
Sudbury	NDP	Lib	12,349	40.66%	3,651	12.02%	NDP	PC	62.10%	8,093	12,349	8,698	–	629	605	30,374
Sudbury East	NDP	NDP	11,236	37.09%	1,642	5.42%	Lib	PC	62.30%	8,680	9,594	11,236	–	473	310	30,293
Timiskaming	Lib	Lib	8,643	46.78%	2,458	13.30%	PC	NDP	64.13%	6,185	8,643	2,962	–	–	685	18,475
Victoria—Haliburton	NDP	PC	25,267	68.42%	18,987	51.41%	Lib	NDP	66.16%	25,267	6,280	4,210	378	643	151	36,929
Waterloo North	PC	PC	25,757	59.42%	17,028	39.29%	Lib	NDP	62.32%	25,757	8,729	6,869	1,714	–	275	43,344
Welland-Thorold	NDP	NDP	12,848	42.71%	4,218	14.02%	Lib	PC	65.22%	8,089	8,630	12,848	–	–	517	30,084
Wellington	PC	PC	21,753	66.70%	16,047	49.20%	Lib	NDP	65.00%	21,753	5,706	4,104	782	–	269	32,614
Wentworth East	NDP	PC	15,888	44.50%	3,606	10.10%	Lib	NDP	64.56%	15,888	12,282	6,667	–	863	–	35,700
Wentworth North	NDP	PC	21,165	55.65%	10,772	28.32%	Lib	NDP	70.97%	21,165	10,393	6,474	–	–	–	38,032
Willowdale	PC	PC	18,834	53.99%	8,964	25.70%	Lib	NDP	68.94%	18,834	9,870	4,825	–	715	639	34,883
Wilson Heights	Lib	Lib	12,468	44.64%	2,696	9.65%	PC	NDP	62.76%	9,772	12,468	4,612	231	109	741	27,933
Windsor—Riverside	NDP	NDP	12,347	45.70%	2,935	10.86%	Lib	PC	54.02%	4,440	9,412	12,347	459	–	362	27,020
Windsor—Sandwich	NDP	Lib	11,940	47.12%	5,526	21.81%	NDP	PC	50.11%	5,704	11,940	6,414	610	410	263	25,341
Windsor—Walkerville	NDP	Lib	10,281	41.28%	380	1.53%	NDP	PC	52.54%	3,610	10,281	9,901	957	–	156	24,905
York Centre	Lib	PC	37,897	48.94%	8,747	11.30%	Lib	NDP	60.80%	37,897	29,150	6,698	1,891	–	1,792	77,428
York East	NDP	PC	12,789	41.65%	3,263	10.63%	NDP	Lib	69.59%	12,789	7,398	9,526	–	748	243	30,704
York Mills	PC	PC	18,852	63.58%	11,534	38.90%	Lib	NDP	69.31%	18,852	7,318	2,930	–	–	553	29,653
York—Mackenzie	Lib	PC	25,904	58.33%	11,931	26.86%	Lib	NDP	67.21%	25,904	13,973	3,611	498	–	425	44,411
York South	NDP	NDP	10,442	41.24%	2,716	10.73%	PC	Lib	69.13%	7,726	6,025	10,442	305	170	653	25,321
Yorkview	NDP	Lib	9,245	46.97%	2,798	14.22%	NDP	PC	60.99%	3,989	9,245	6,447	–	–	–	19,681

= open seat
= turnout is above provincial average
= winning candidate was in previous Legislature
= not incumbent; was previously elected to the Legislature
= incumbent had switched allegiance
= incumbency arose from byelection gain
= previously incumbent in another riding
= other incumbents renominated
= previously an MP in the House of Commons of Canada
= multiple candidates

=== Comparative analysis for ridings (1995 vs 1990) ===
Summary of riding results by turnout and vote share for winning candidate (vs 1990) (Note: Summarized from "Data Explorer". Elections Ontario.)
Riding and winning party			Turnout		Vote share	
Riding and winning party			%	Change (pp)	%	Change (pp)
Algoma	NDP	Hold	64.02	-1.60	44.47	-14.18
Algoma—Manitoulin	Lib	Hold	59.33	-1.92	46.96	8.10
Beaches—Woodbine	NDP	Hold	67.14	1.19	42.44	-15.91
Brampton North	PC	Gain	59.17	0.82	49.47	26.70
Brampton South	PC	Gain	59.78	0.43	49.67	21.17
Brantford	PC	Gain	59.90	-6.81	41.01	32.54
Brant—Haldimand	PC	Gain	61.67	0.49	47.81	26.17
Bruce	PC	Gain	69.34	0.42	42.70	18.55
Burlington South	PC	Hold	69.20	-0.28	72.56	20.02
Cambridge	PC	Gain	59.56	-5.28	46.93	34.63
Carleton	PC	Hold	62.05	-3.10	64.96	18.06
Carleton East	Lib	Hold	60.34	-3.18	48.19	-5.68
Chatham—Kent	PC	Gain	58.54	-4.47	36.29	18.24
Cochrane North	NDP	Hold	58.96	-3.21	45.62	5.15
Cochrane South	NDP	Hold	60.36	-2.59	52.45	4.83
Cornwall	Lib	Hold	55.53	-8.26	59.70	13.17
Don Mills	PC	Gain	66.09	1.85	53.36	26.57
Dovercourt	NDP	Hold	63.22	-3.04	47.23	-7.02
Downsview	Lib	Gain	63.90	-2.18	39.48	4.88
Dufferin—Peel	PC	Hold	65.37	-1.20	66.00	31.34
Durham Centre	PC	Gain	65.02	3.79	58.34	32.34
Durham East	PC	Gain	63.79	0.36	61.79	29.20
Durham West	PC	Gain	63.83	1.47	54.58	29.02
Durham—York	PC	Gain	63.45	1.55	60.40	30.34
Eglinton	PC	Gain	73.65	3.67	48.82	13.37
Elgin	Ind	Gain	61.17	-5.34	37.79	New
Essex-Kent	Lib	Gain	58.85	-8.67	37.01	3.91
Essex South	Lib	Hold	50.91	-8.49	54.48	18.46
Etobicoke—Humber	PC	Gain	73.35	3.05	51.26	24.85
Etobicoke—Lakeshore	PC	Gain	66.55	0.40	45.23	29.90
Etobicoke—Rexdale	PC	Gain	59.51	-1.91	36.57	24.22
Etobicoke West	PC	Hold	70.68	0.81	55.30	14.74
Fort William	Lib	Hold	63.29	0.55	57.32	12.88
Fort York	NDP	Hold	64.86	1.38	41.02	-5.29
Frontenac—Addington	PC	Gain	62.52	-2.63	38.52	10.37
Grey—Owen Sound	PC	Hold	65.58	0.38	63.21	27.10
Guelph	PC	Gain	66.31	-3.17	42.55	16.90
Halton Centre	PC	Gain	69.06	5.94	61.41	29.53
Halton North	PC	Gain	66.58	2.08	60.90	33.64
Hamilton Centre	NDP	Hold	54.71	-5.07	36.81	-18.51
Hamilton East	Lib	Gain	57.85	-3.85	43.55	24.05
Hamilton Mountain	PC	Gain	64.41	-2.14	36.60	16.12
Hamilton West	PC	Gain	67.00	-0.90	40.54	27.23
Hastings—Peterborough	PC	Gain	67.44	-1.32	54.17	17.45
High Park—Swansea	PC	Gain	70.36	5.54	38.77	20.33
Huron	PC	Gain	70.00	-1.47	46.16	14.98
Kenora	Lib	Hold	52.02	-9.66	53.72	13.17
Kingston and the Islands	Lib	Gain	61.08	4.09	36.90	6.72
Kitchener	PC	Gain	60.12	-2.78	40.15	21.85
Kitchener—Wilmot	PC	Gain	59.07	-1.02	45.70	25.60
Lake Nipigon	NDP	Hold	54.99	-5.00	42.99	-22.21
Lambton	PC	Gain	64.70	-3.47	43.58	15.88
Lanark—Renfrew	PC	Hold	59.87	-0.51	55.79	23.31
Lawrence	Lib	Hold	65.08	-0.60	45.88	1.18
Leeds—Grenville	PC	Hold	63.06	-3.12	63.27	14.20
Lincoln	PC	Gain	68.09	0.02	50.68	23.13
London Centre	NDP	Hold	53.26	-12.79	36.77	-14.54
London North	PC	Hold	64.73	-3.07	52.65	11.35
London South	PC	Gain	61.88	-3.73	44.35	20.45
Markham	PC	Hold	62.80	-1.60	64.81	14.84
Middlesex	PC	Gain	64.67	-4.14	40.35	17.01
Mississauga East	PC	Gain	60.38	-1.24	52.07	25.92
Mississauga North	PC	Gain	57.37	-0.40	47.76	23.87
Mississauga South	PC	Hold	65.39	-0.30	69.76	17.31
Mississauga West	PC	Gain	60.33	0.74	46.21	21.10
Muskoka—Georgian Bay	PC	Gain	65.50	-2.15	51.79	19.99
Nepean	PC	Gain	64.97	2.05	49.66	19.13
Niagara Falls	PC	Gain	59.48	-3.90	43.33	30.32
Niagara South	PC	Gain	60.14	-4.97	38.24	21.42
Nickel Belt	NDP	Hold	64.70	-4.37	46.54	-12.00
Nipissing	PC	Hold	63.68	-6.48	60.48	14.63
Norfolk	PC	Gain	64.14	-3.81	48.68	20.01
Northumberland	PC	Gain	67.13	0.21	52.14	21.67
Oakville South	PC	Hold	71.08	4.36	63.34	28.36
Oakwood	Lib	Gain	65.74	-1.94	42.31	4.23
Oriole	Lib	Hold	68.39	2.26	43.70	1.85
Oshawa	PC	Gain	57.66	5.67	54.33	40.08
Ottawa Centre	Lib	Gain	63.88	-3.29	39.26	0.98
Ottawa East	Lib	Hold	53.21	-2.02	56.94	-5.47
Ottawa—Rideau	PC	Gain	61.29	1.33	45.11	27.49
Ottawa South	Lib	Hold	66.51	-2.05	53.35	7.48
Ottawa West	Lib	Hold	64.43	-1.25	45.48	3.87
Oxford	PC	Gain	64.02	-3.63	49.48	22.47
Parkdale	Lib	Hold	64.03	2.81	47.87	1.47
Parry Sound	PC	Hold	63.57	-1.52	65.47	21.69
Perth	PC	Gain	62.90	-3.34	44.81	17.76
Peterborough	PC	Gain	66.23	-0.42	52.66	31.45
Port Arthur	Lib	Gain	61.91	-0.32	48.92	9.77
Prescott and Russell	Lib	Hold	56.64	-2.64	55.68	-9.29
Prince Edward—Lennox—South Hastings	PC	Gain	60.04	-1.41	49.61	19.71
Quinte	PC	Gain	58.79	-0.63	47.28	27.66
Rainy River	NDP	Hold	63.98	-2.37	39.93	-21.54
Renfrew North	Lib	Hold	61.00	-4.62	53.32	10.00
Riverdale	NDP	Hold	64.66	2.21	46.88	-15.09
St. Andrew—St. Patrick	PC	Gain	67.16	0.27	40.43	9.58
St. Catharines	Lib	Hold	64.58	-2.19	46.53	7.77
St. Catharines—Brock	PC	Gain	62.56	-3.29	47.02	21.66
St. George—St. David	PC	Gain	70.61	5.98	33.87	10.46
Sarnia	PC	Gain	61.31	-3.54	33.81	12.62
Sault Ste. Marie	NDP	Hold	62.24	-6.01	43.33	7.08
Scarborough—Agincourt	Lib	Hold	61.37	-2.17	46.08	1.77
Scarborough Centre	PC	Gain	63.35	-1.10	45.88	25.04
Scarborough East	PC	Gain	64.69	1.22	55.72	25.67
Scarborough—Ellesmere	PC	Gain	64.95	-1.84	47.89	31.21
Scarborough North	Lib	Hold	58.67	0.82	46.08	1.52
Scarborough West	PC	Gain	64.33	-0.89	43.13	22.54
Simcoe Centre	PC	Gain	63.06	0.60	58.25	34.17
Simcoe East	PC	Hold	66.52	-0.94	60.97	21.32
Simcoe West	PC	Hold	63.01	-0.83	68.24	31.75
S-D-G & East Grenville	PC	Hold	62.48	-3.29	64.69	23.82
Sudbury	Lib	Gain	62.10	-4.47	40.66	9.88
Sudbury East	NDP	Hold	62.30	-8.56	37.09	-20.91
Timiskaming	Lib	Hold	64.13	-3.44	46.78	4.49
Victoria—Haliburton	PC	Gain	66.16	-2.94	68.42	42.78
Waterloo North	PC	Hold	62.32	0.30	59.42	22.00
Welland-Thorold	NDP	Hold	65.22	-4.58	42.71	-20.92
Wellington	PC	Hold	65.00	-1.45	66.70	27.08
Wentworth East	PC	Gain	64.56	-2.26	44.50	28.06
Wentworth North	PC	Gain	70.97	1.33	55.65	29.71
Willowdale	PC	Hold	68.94	5.61	53.99	18.79
Wilson Heights	Lib	Hold	62.76	-0.23	44.64	0.37
Windsor—Riverside	NDP	Hold	54.02	-8.14	45.70	-25.33
Windsor—Sandwich	Lib	Gain	50.11	-8.85	47.12	6.82
Windsor—Walkerville	Lib	Gain	52.54	-7.20	41.28	1.08
York Centre	PC	Gain	60.80	-1.05	48.94	25.14
York East	PC	Gain	69.59	1.57	41.65	14.78
York Mills	PC	Hold	69.31	1.01	63.58	18.94
York—Mackenzie	PC	Gain	67.21	4.08	58.33	24.52
York South	NDP	Hold	69.13	2.33	41.24	-25.47
Yorkview	Lib	Gain	60.99	-0.12	46.97	5.47

=== Analysis ===
Party candidates in 2nd place
Party in 1st place	Party in 2nd place			Total
Party in 1st place	PC	Lib	NDP	Total
Progressive Conservative		67	15	82
Liberal	20		10	30
New Democratic	7	10		17
Independent	1			1
Total	28	77	25	130

Candidates ranked 1st to 5th place, by party
Parties	1st	2nd	3rd	4th	5th
█ Progressive Conservative	82	28	20		
█ Liberal	30	77	23		
█ New Democratic	17	25	87	1	
█ Independent	1			20	20
█ Family Coalition				50	4
█ Green				15	16
█ Natural Law				12	32
█ Confederation of Regions				5	
█ Libertarian				4	8
█ Freedom				4	4
█ Communist					3

Resulting composition of the 36th Legislative Assembly
Source		Party				
Source		PC	Lib	NDP	Ind	Total
Seats retained	Incumbents returned	19	18	17		54
Seats retained	Open seats held	1	1			2
Seats changing hands	Incumbents defeated	53	9			62
Seats changing hands	Open seats gained	7	2			9
Seats changing hands	Byelection gain held	2				2
Seats changing hands	Incumbent changing allegiance				1	1
Total		82	30	17	1	130

=== MPPs elected by region and riding ===
Party designations are as follows:

PC
Liberal
NDP

Northern Ontario

Algoma: Bud Wildman
Algoma—Manitoulin: Mike Brown
Cochrane North: Len Wood
Cochrane South: Gilles Bisson
Fort William: Lyn McLeod
Kenora: Frank Miclash
Lake Nipigon: Gilles Pouliot
Nickel Belt: Floyd Laughren
Nipissing: Mike Harris
Port Arthur: Michael Gravelle
Rainy River: Howard Hampton
Sault Ste. Marie: Tony Martin
Sudbury: Rick Bartolucci
Sudbury East: Shelley Martel
Timiskaming: David Ramsay

Ottawa Valley

Carleton: Norm Sterling
Carleton East: Gilles Morin
Lanark—Renfrew: Leo Jordan
Nepean: John Baird
Ottawa Centre: Richard Patten
Ottawa East: Bernard Grandmaître
Ottawa South: Dalton McGuinty
Ottawa West: Bob Chiarelli
Ottawa—Rideau: Garry Guzzo
Prescott and Russell: Jean-Marc Lalonde
Renfrew North: Sean Conway

Saint Lawrence Valley

Cornwall: John Cleary
Kingston and the Islands: John Gerretsen
Leeds—Grenville: Bob Runciman
S-D-G & East Grenville: Noble Villeneuve

Central Ontario

Frontenac—Addington: Bill Vankoughnet
Hastings—Peterborough: Harry Danford
Northumberland: Doug Galt
Peterborough: Gary Stewart
Prince Edward—Lennox—South Hastings:Gary Fox
Quinte: Doug Rollins
Victoria—Haliburton: Chris Hodgson

Georgian Bay

Bruce: Barb Fisher
Grey—Owen Sound: Bill Murdoch
Muskoka—Georgian Bay: Bill Grimmett
Parry Sound: Ernie Eves
Simcoe Centre: Joe Tascona
Simcoe East: Al McLean
Simcoe West: Jim Wilson

Hamilton/Halton/Niagara

Burlington South: Cam Jackson
Halton Centre: Terence Young
Halton North: Ted Chudleigh
Hamilton Centre: David Christopherson
Hamilton East: Dominic Agostino
Hamilton Mountain: Trevor Pettit
Hamilton West: Lillian Ross
Lincoln: Frank Sheehan
Niagara Falls: Bart Maves
Niagara South: Tim Hudak
Oakville South: Gary Carr
St. Catharines: Jim Bradley
St. Catharines—Brock: Tom Froese
Welland—Thorold: Peter Kormos
Wentworth East: Ed Doyle
Wentworth North: Toni Skarica

Midwestern Ontario

Brant—Haldimand: Peter Preston
Brantford: Ron Johnson
Cambridge: Gerry Martiniuk
Dufferin—Peel: David Tilson
Guelph: Brenda Elliott
Huron: Helen Johns
Kitchener: Wayne Wettlaufer
Kitchener—Wilmot: Gary Leadston
Norfolk: Toby Barrett
Oxford: Ernie Hardeman
Perth: Bert Johnson
Waterloo North: Elizabeth Witmer
Wellington: Ted Arnott

Southwestern Ontario

Chatham—Kent: Jack Carroll
Elgin: Peter North
Essex South: Bruce Crozier
Essex—Kent: Pat Hoy
Lambton: Marcel Beaubien
London Centre: Marion Boyd
London North: Dianne Cunningham
London South: Bob Wood
Middlesex: Bruce Smith
Sarnia: Dave Boushy
Windsor—Riverside: Dave Cooke
Windsor—Sandwich: Sandra Pupatello
Windsor—Walkerville: Dwight Duncan

Peel/York/Durham

Brampton North: Joe Spina
Brampton South: Tony Clement
Durham Centre: Jim Flaherty
Durham East:John O'Toole
Durham West: Janet Ecker
Durham—York: Julia Munro
Markham: David Tsubouchi
Mississauga East: Carl DeFaria
Mississauga North: John Snobelen
Mississauga South: Margaret Marland
Mississauga West: Rob Sampson
Oshawa:Jerry Ouellette
York Centre: Al Palladini
York—Mackenzie: Frank Klees

Metropolitan Toronto

Beaches—Woodbine: Frances Lankin
Don Mills: David Johnson
Dovercourt: Tony Silipo
Downsview: Annamarie Castrilli
Eglinton: Bill Saunderson
Etobicoke West: Chris Stockwell
Etobicoke—Humber: Doug Ford, Sr.
Etobicoke—Lakeshore: Morley Kells
Etobicoke—Rexdale: John Hastings
Fort York: Rosario Marchese
High Park—Swansea: Derwyn Shea
Lawrence: Joseph Cordiano
Oakwood: Mike Colle
Oriole: Elinor Caplan
Parkdale: Tony Ruprecht
Riverdale: Marilyn Churley
Scarborough—Agincourt: Gerry Phillips
Scarborough Centre: Dan Newman
Scarborough East: Steve Gilchrist
Scarborough—Ellesmere: Marilyn Mushinski
Scarborough North: Alvin Curling
Scarborough West: Jim Brown
St. Andrew—St. Patrick: Isabel Bassett
St. George—St. David: Al Leach
Willowdale: Charles Harnick
Wilson Heights: Monte Kwinter
York East: John Parker
York Mills: David Turnbull
York South: Bob Rae
Yorkview: Mario Sergio

== Byelections ==
Due to resignations, five by-elections were held between the 1995 and 1999 elections.

Electoral district	Candidates				Incumbent
Electoral district	Liberal	PC	NDP	Other	Incumbent
York South; May 23, 1996	Gerard Kennedy; 7,774	Rob Davis; 5,093	David Miller; 6,656	David Milne (Ind); 151; George Dance (Lbt); 77; Kevin Clarke (Ind); 70	Bob Rae resigned February 29, 1996
Oriole; September 4, 1997	David Caplan; 9,954	Barbara Greene; 5,163	Jim Kafieh; 1,700	Bernadette Michael (Ind); 132; Shelly Lipsey (G); 96	Elinor Caplan resigned May 5, 1997
Ottawa West; September 4, 1997	Alex Cullen; 11,438	Chris Thompson; 7,217	Katrina Prystupa; 2,573	John Turmel (Ind); 201; Gene Villeneuve (G); 96	Bob Chiarelli resigned May 5, 1997
Windsor—Riverside; September 4, 1997	Gary McNamara; 8,494	Fran Funero; 3,028	Wayne Lessard; 9,308	Steve Harvey (G); 329	Dave Cooke resigned May 5, 1997
Nickel Belt; October 1, 1998	Frank Madigan; 4,173	Gerry Courtemanche; 3,836	Blain Morin; 5,537		Floyd Laughren resigned February 28, 1998

== See also ==
- Politics of Ontario
- List of Ontario political parties
- Premier of Ontario
- Leader of the Opposition (Ontario)
