= Al McLean (politician) =

Canadian politician (1937–2024)

34th Speaker of the Legislative Assembly of Ontario
- In office September 26, 1995 – September 26, 1996
- Preceded by: David William Warner
- Succeeded by: Ed Doyle

Member of the Ontario Provincial Parliament for Simcoe East
- In office March 19, 1981 – June 3, 1999
- Preceded by: Gordon Smith
- Succeeded by: Riding abolished

Personal details
- Born: March 20, 1937 Barrie, Ontario, Canada
- Died: November 20, 2024 (aged 87) Orillia, Ontario, Canada
- Party: Progressive Conservative

Allan Kenneth McLean (March 20, 1937 – November 20, 2024) was a Canadian politician in Ontario. He was a Progressive Conservative member of the Legislative Assembly of Ontario from 1981 to 1999 who represented the riding of Simcoe East. He was a cabinet minister in the government of Frank Miller and served as speaker of the assembly before being forced out of office due to a scandal.

== Politics ==
McLean was elected to the Ontario legislature in the 1981 provincial election, defeating NDP candidate Fayne Bullen by about 3,500 votes in the riding of Simcoe East. He served as Deputy Whip of the PC party from 1983 to 1985, and was appointed a minister without portfolio by Premier Frank Miller on February 8, 1985.

McLean's time as a cabinet minister was brief. He was re-elected over Fayne Bullen in the 1985 provincial election, but the Progressive Conservative Party was reduced to a fragile minority government provincially. He was re-appointed as a minister without portfolio responsible for Northern Affairs and Housing on May 17, 1985, but the Miller government was defeated in the legislature one month later and McLean moved with his party to the opposition benches.

McLean was one of only seventeen PC members re-elected in the 1987 provincial election, defeating Liberal Butch Orser by fewer than 1,000 votes. In the 1990 provincial election, he defeated NDP candidate Dennis Bailey by only 740 votes.

The Progressive Conservatives won a majority government in the 1995 election, and on this occasion McLean defeated his nearest opponent by more than 14,000 votes. On September 26, 1995, he was chosen as speaker of the legislature.

In August 1996, McLean was accused of sexual harassment by an assistant to the Speaker. She complained that she had been harassed extensively since her appointment in March, six months previous. It was later revealed by the employee that there were four instances of sexual coercion and that McLean fired her after she rebuffed him. McLean denied the allegations but further investigations revealed that he had been subject to previous sexual harassment claims ten years prior to this event. In that case McLean settled out of court. An investigation by The Globe and Mail found public documents that showed McLean had paid $2,000 to the complainant. There was at least one other instance of sexual harassment and in the latest case, McLean hired a private investigator to look into the background of his accuser. McLean was sued by the former employee and the suit was settled out-of-court for $400,000. The settlement and McLean's legal expenses were paid for by the Conservative government.

When the legislature resumed sitting in September, the opposition NDP introduced a motion demanding that McLean be replaced. The PCs refused to vote on the motion. McLean went on to say that he would sue any MPP that made the decade old reports public. After receiving legal advice that he could not sue, McLean decided to take a three-month leave of absence for medical reasons. On September 26, 1996, McLean announced his resignation as Speaker of the House.

McLean decided not to run in the 1999 election.

== Later life and death ==
In October 1999, McLean was appointed to the Assessment Review Board which hears appeals regarding municipal property taxes. In 2015, McLean self-published his memoirs. Titled Farmer Politician, it details his career in politics. In the book he denies involvement in the sexual harassment complaints made against him.

McLean died in Orillia, Ontario on November 20, 2024, at the age of 87.
