= Ontario New Democratic Party candidates in the 1999 Ontario provincial election =

The New Democratic Party of Ontario ran a full slate of 103 candidates in the 1999 provincial election. Nine of these candidates were elected, making the party the third-largest in the Legislative Assembly of Ontario. Some of these candidates have separate biography pages; information on others may be found here.

This page also includes information about New Democratic Party of Ontario candidates in by-elections held between 1999 and 2003.

== Central Ontario ==
Riding	Candidate's Name	Notes	Residence	Occupation	Votes	%	Rank
Barrie—Simcoe—Bradford	Jim Brooker				2,532	4.81	3rd
Dufferin—Peel—Wellington—Grey	Noel Duignan	Member of Provincial Parliament for Halton North (1990–1995)	Georgetown	Executive assistant	1,871	3.97	3rd
Durham	Jim Morrison				4,235	9.26	3rd
Haliburton—Victoria—Brock	Rick Denyer				3,786	7.40	3rd
Northumberland	Murray Weppler				2,820	6.32	3rd
Peterborough	Dave Nickle				7,058	13.00	3rd
Simcoe—Grey	Mary Hart				3,662	7.56	3rd
Simcoe North	Ann Billings				2,913	5.92	3rd

== Eastern Ontario/Ottawa ==
Riding	Candidate's Name	Notes	Residence	Occupation	Votes	%	Rank
Glengarry—Prescott—Russell	Stéphane Landry						
Hastings—Frontenac—Lennox and Addington	Allan McPhail						
Kingston and the Islands	Beth Pater						
Lanark—Carleton	Sheila Sansome						
Leeds—Grenville	Jim Murray						
Nepean—Carleton	Craig Parsons						
Ottawa Centre	Elisabeth Arnold						
Ottawa—Orléans	Jamie Gallant						
Ottawa South	James McLaren						
Ottawa Vanier	David Gagnon						
Ottawa West—Nepean	Alex Cullen	Member of Provincial Parliament for Ottawa West (1997–1999); Member of Ottawa City Council for Richmond Ward (1991–1994); Ottawa Board of Education trustee (1982–1988)	Britannia, Ottawa	Economist	7,701	16.12	3rd
Prince Edward—Hastings	Bev Campbell						
Renfrew—Nipissing—Pembroke	Gerry Boyer						
Stormont—Dundas—Charlottenburgh	Maggie MacDonald		Cornwall	Playwright/musician	2,012	4.76	3rd

== Greater Toronto Area ==
Riding	Candidate's Name	Notes	Residence	Occupation	Votes	%	Rank
Beaches—East York	Frances Lankin	Member of Provincial Parliament for Beaches—Woodbine (1990–1999)			19,703	45.57	1st
Bramalea—Gore—Malton—Springdale	Vishnu Roche						
Brampton Centre	Paul Schmidt						
Brampton West—Mississauga	John Devries						
Broadview—Greenwood	Marilyn Churley	Member of Provincial Parliament for Riverdale (1990–1999); Member of Toronto City Council (1988–1990)	Toronto		18,150	46.92	1st
Burlington	Danny Dunleavy						
Davenport	Tony Silipo	Member of Provincial Parliament for Dovercourt (1990–1999); Toronto Board of Education trustee (1978–1990)	Toronto	Lawyer	8,717	31.76	1st
Don Valley East	Janaki Bala-Krishnan						
Don Valley West	Geoffrey Allen						
Eglinton—Lawrence	Jay Waterman						
Etobicoke Centre	Bonte Minnema						
Etobicoke—Lakeshore	Vicki Obedkoff						
Etobicoke North	Ed Philip	Member of Provincial Parliament for Etobicoke—Rexdale (1987–1995); Member of Provincial Parliament for Etobicoke (1975–1987)	Rexdale		8,166	23.92	3rd
Halton	Jay Jackson						
Markham	Janice Hagan						
Mississauga Centre	Gail McCabe						
Mississauga East	James Kafieh						
Mississauga South	Ken Cole						
Mississauga West	Maxine Caron						
Oak Ridges	Chris Moise				1,957	3.86	3rd
Oakville	Sean Cain						
Oshawa	Colleen Twomey						
Parkdale—High Park	Irene Atkinson						
Pickering—Ajax—Uxbridge	Jim Wiseman	Member of Provincial Parliament for Durham West (1990–1995)	Ajax	Teacher	2,814	5.71	3rd
St. Paul's	Larry Solway			Broadcaster/actor	3,350	7.13	3rd
Scarborough—Agincourt	Bob Frankford	Member of Provincial Parliament for Scarborough East (1990–1995)		Physician	1,319	3.58	3rd
Scarborough Centre	Sid Ryan	President of CUPE Ontario (1992–2009)		Union leader	8,399	19.91	3rd
Scarborough East	Terry Maley						
Scarborough—Rouge River	Paulette Senior				2,138	6.10	3rd
Scarborough Southwest	Michael Yorke						
Thornhill	Nathan Rotman						
Toronto Centre—Rosedale	Helen Breslauer						
Trinity—Spadina	Rosario Marchese	Member of Provincial Parliament for Fort York (1990–1999); Toronto District School Board trustee (1982–1990)	Toronto	Teacher	17,110	47.89	1st
Vaughan—King—Aurora	Michael Seaward						
Whitby—Ajax	Betty Craig						
Willowdale	Mikael Swayze						
York Centre	Norm Jesin						
York North	Steve Saysell						
York South—Weston	Rosana Pellizzari						
York West	Stephanie Payne						

== Hamilton/Niagara ==
Riding	Candidate's Name	Notes	Residence	Occupation	Votes	%	Rank
Ancaster—Dundas—Flamborough—Aldershot	Jessica Brennan						
Brant	David Sharpe						
Erie—Lincoln	Dave Thmoas						
Hamilton East	Bob Sutton						
Hamilton Mountain	Chris Charlton						
Hamilton West	David Christopherson						
Niagara Centre	Peter Kormos						
Niagara Falls	Claude Sonnier						
St. Catharines	Gordon Coggins						
Stoney Creek	Robert Barlow						

== Northern Ontario ==
Riding	Candidate's Name	Notes	Residence	Occupation	Votes	%	Rank
Algoma—Manitoulin	Lynn Watson						
Kenora—Rainy River	Howard Hampton						
Nickel Belt	Shelley Martel						
Nipissing	Wendy Young						
Parry Sound—Muskoka	Dan Waters						
Sault Ste. Marie	Tony Martin						
Sudbury	Paul Chislett						
Thunder Bay—Atikokan	Jack Drewes						
Thunder Bay—Superior North	Nathalie Galesloot						
Timiskaming—Cochrane	Len Wood						
Timmins—James Bay	Gilles Bisson						

== Southwestern Ontario ==
Riding	Candidate's Name	Notes	Residence	Occupation	Votes	%	Rank
Bruce—Grey	Colleen Purdon						
Cambridge	Gary Gibson						
Chatham-Kent—Essex	Brian Sharp						
Elgin—Middlesex—London	Dave Lapointe						
Essex	Merv Richards						
Guelph—Wellington	Bruce Abel						
Haldimand—Norfolk—Brant	Prue Steiner						
Huron—Bruce	Tony McQuail						
Kitchener Centre	David Brohman						
Kitchener—Waterloo	Ted Martin						
Lambton—Kent—Middlesex	Jim Lee						
London—Fanshawe	Irene Mathyssen						
London North Centre	Marion Boyd						
London West	Sandra McNee						
Oxford	Martin Donlevy						
Perth—Middlesex	Walter Vernon						
Sarnia—Lambton	Mark Kotanen						
Waterloo—Wellington	Richard Walsh-Bowers						
Windsor—St. Clair	Wayne Lessard						
Windsor West	Liam McCarthy						

== By-elections ==
Riding	Candidate's Name	Notes	Residence	Occupation	Votes	%	Rank
Ancaster—Dundas—Flamborough—Aldershot	Jessica Brennan	September 7, 2000			2,297		3
Beaches—East York	Michael Prue	September 20, 2001			14,024		1
Dufferin—Peel—Wellington—Grey	Doug Wilcox	May 2, 2002			2,633		3
Nipissing	Wendy Young	May 2, 2002			1,821		3
Parry Sound—Muskoka	Joanne Bury	February 8, 2001			888		4
Vaughan—King—Aurora	Michael Seaward	June 28, 2001			708		4
