= Progressive Conservative Party of Ontario candidates in the 2003 Ontario provincial election =

The Progressive Conservative Party of Ontario fielded a full slate of 103 candidates in the 2003 Ontario general election. The party, which had been in power since 1995, won twenty-four seats to become the official opposition in the sitting of the legislature that followed.

== Candidates ==
| Riding | Candidate's Name | Occupation | Votes | % | Rank | Notes |
|---|---|---|---|---|---|---|
| Algoma—Manitoulin | Terry McCutcheon | | 5,168 | 17.33 | 3rd | |
| Ancaster—Dundas—Flamborough—Aldershot | Mark Mullins | | 18,141 | 37.42 | 2nd | Ran for the Reform Party in Hamilton—Wentworth in the 1993 Canadian federal election. |
| Barrie—Simcoe—Bradford | Joe Tascona | | 31,529 | 51.78 | 1st | Incumbent |
| Beaches—East York | Angela Kennedy | Registered Nurse | 8,157 | 19.67 | 3rd | Later chaired the Toronto Catholic District School Board on two occasions. |
| Bramalea—Gore—Malton—Springdale | Raminder Gill | | 15,549 | 36.73 | 2nd | Incumbent |
| Brampton Centre | Joe Spina | | 15,656 | 40.86 | 2nd | Incumbent |
| Brampton West—Mississauga | Tony Clement | | 26,414 | 42.17 | 2nd | Incumbent; Minister of Health and Long-Term Care |
| Brant | Alayne Sokoloski | | 13,618 | 30.65 | 2nd | Ran in the same division in the 1999 Ontario general election. |
| Bruce—Grey—Owen Sound | Bill Murdoch | | 23,338 | 52.07 | 1st | Incumbent |
| Burlington | Cam Jackson | | 21,506 | 46.15 | 1st | Incumbent; resigned seat on 28 September 2006 |
| Cambridge | Gerry Martiniuk | | 19,996 | 42.50 | 1st | Incumbent |
| Chatham-Kent—Essex | Dave Wilkinson | | 11,586 | 29.82 | 2nd | |
| Davenport | Tom Smith | | 1,977 | 7.46 | 3rd | |
| Don Valley East | Paul Sutherland | | 12,027 | 32.03 | 2nd | |
| Don Valley West | David Turnbull | | 17,394 | 38.95 | 2nd | Incumbent; Associate Minister of Enterprise, Opportunity and Innovation |
| Dufferin—Peel—Wellington—Grey | Ernie Eves | | 29,222 | 56.64 | 1st | Incumbent; party leader and Premier of Ontario; resigned seat on 1 February 2005 |
| Durham | John O'Toole | | 23,814 | 47.09 | 1st | Incumbent |
| Eglinton—Lawrence | Corinne Korzen | | 12,402 | 29.72 | 2nd | |
| Elgin—Middlesex—London | Bruce Smith | | 13,149 | 30.25 | 2nd | |
| Erie—Lincoln | Tim Hudak | | 20,348 | 48.49 | 1st | Incumbent; Minister of Consumer and Business Services |
| Essex | Patrick O'Neil | | 11,234 | 24.74 | 3rd | |
| Etobicoke Centre | Rose Andrachuk | | 17,610 | 39.43 | 2nd | |
| Etobicoke—Lakeshore | Morley Kells | | 14,524 | 32.59 | 2nd | Incumbent |
| Etobicoke North | Baljit Gosal | | 6,978 | 22.52 | 2nd | |
| Glengarry—Prescott—Russell | Albert Bourdeau | | 10,921 | 24.88 | 2nd | |
| Guelph—Wellington | Brenda Elliott | | 20,735 | 37.08 | 2nd | Incumbent; Minister of Community, Family and Social Services |
| Haldimand—Norfolk—Brant | Toby Barrett | | 20,109 | 46.10 | 1st | Incumbent |
| Haliburton—Victoria—Brock | Laurie Scott | | 24,297 | 47.41 | 1st | |
| Halton | Ted Chudleigh | | 33,610 | 48.20 | 1st | Incumbent |
| Hamilton East | Sohail Bhatti | | 4,033 | 13.13 | 3rd | |
| Hamilton Mountain | Shakil Hassan | | 8,637 | 19.02 | 3rd | |
| Hamilton West | Doug Brown | | 8,185 | 20.97 | 3rd | |
| Hastings—Frontenac—Lennox and Addington | Barry Gordon | Auctioneer | 13,709 | 33.01 | 2nd | Member of the Pittsburgh Township council from 1980 to 1988 and reeve from 1989 to 1994. Ran for the Progressive Conservative Party in Kingston and the Islands in the 1993 Canadian federal election. |
| Huron—Bruce | Helen Johns | | 16,594 | 38.23 | 2nd | Incumbent; Minister of Agriculture and Food |
| Kenora—Rainy River | Cathe Hoszowski | | 3,343 | 12.83 | 3rd | |
| Kingston and the Islands | Hans Westenberg | | 9,640 | 20.12 | 2nd | |
| Kitchener Centre | Wayne Wettlaufer | | 16,120 | 37.57 | 2nd | Incumbent |
| Kitchener—Waterloo | Elizabeth Witmer | | 23,957 | 43.08 | 1st | Incumbent; Deputy Premier of Ontario and Minister of Education |
| Lambton—Kent—Middlesex | Marcel Beaubien | | 15,060 | 36.66 | 2nd | Incumbent |
| Lanark—Carleton | Norm Sterling | | 29,641 | 48.99 | 1st | Incumbent; Attorney General and Minister responsible for Native Affairs |
| Leeds—Grenville | Bob Runciman | | 21,443 | 48.70 | 1st | Incumbent; Minister of Public Safety and Security |
| London—Fanshawe | Frank Mazzilli | | 11,777 | 30.35 | 3rd | Incumbent |
| London North Centre | Dianne Cunningham | | 13,460 | 28.92 | 2nd | Incumbent; Minister of Training, Colleges and Universities and Minister responsible for Women's Issues |
| London West | Bob Wood | | 15,463 | 31.11 | 2nd | Incumbent |
| Markham | David Tsubouchi | | 21,257 | 40.33 | 2nd | Incumbent; Minister of Culture |
| Mississauga Centre | Rob Sampson | | 15,846 | 40.72 | 2nd | Incumbent |
| Mississauga East | Carl DeFaria | | 13,832 | 40.35 | 2nd | Incumbent; Minister of Citizenship and Minister responsible for Senior Citizens |
| Mississauga South | Margaret Marland | | 16,977 | 43.20 | 2nd | Incumbent |
| Mississauga West | Nina Tangri | | 20,406 | 37.18 | 2nd | |
| Nepean—Carleton | John Baird | | 31,662 | 54.06 | 1st | Incumbent; Government House Leader and Minister of Energy; resigned seat on 29 November 2005 |
| Niagara Centre | Ann Gronski | | 12,526 | 26.70 | 3rd | |
| Niagara Falls | Bart Maves | | 15,353 | 38.06 | 2nd | Incumbent |
| Nickel Belt | Dave Kilgour | | 4,804 | 13.49 | 3rd | |
| Nipissing | Al McDonald | | 14,978 | 41.47 | 2nd | Incumbent |
| Northumberland | Doug Galt | | 17,816 | 39.37 | 2nd | Incumbent; Chief Government Whip and Minister without Portfolio |
| Oak Ridges | Frank Klees | | 32,647 | 47.27 | 1st | Incumbent; Minister of Transportation |
| Oakville | Kurt Franklin | | 18,991 | 42.18 | 2nd | |
| Oshawa | Jerry Ouellette | | 14,566 | 37.32 | 1st | Incumbent; Minister of Natural Resources |
| Ottawa Centre | Joe Varner | Policy Advisor | 11,217 | 22.69 | 3rd | Spouse of Lisa MacLeod |
| Ottawa—Orléans | Brian Coburn | | 20,762 | 41.32 | 2nd | Incumbent; Minister of Tourism and Recreation |
| Ottawa South | Richard Raymond | | 16,413 | 34.43 | 2nd | |
| Ottawa—Vanier | Maurice Lamirande | | 10,878 | 26.24 | 2nd | Ran in the same division in the 1999 Ontario general election. |
| Ottawa West—Nepean | Garry Guzzo | | 20,277 | 41.24 | 2nd | Incumbent |
| Oxford | Ernie Hardeman | | 18,656 | 44.06 | 1st | Incumbent; Associate Minister of Municipal Affairs and Housing with responsibility for Rural Affairs |
| Parkdale—High Park | Stephen Snell | | 6,436 | 16.18 | 2nd | |
| Parry Sound—Muskoka | Norm Miller | | 18,776 | 48.51 | 1st | Incumbent |
| Perth—Middlesex | Bert Johnson | | 15,680 | 39.36 | 2nd | Incumbent |
| Peterborough | Gary Stewart | | 18,418 | 33.46 | 2nd | Incumbent |
| Pickering—Ajax—Uxbridge | Janet Ecker | | 23,960 | 43.91 | 2nd | Incumbent; Minister of Finance |
| Prince Edward—Hastings | John Williams | | 12,800 | 32.02 | 2nd | |
| Renfrew—Nipissing—Pembroke | John Yakabuski | | 19,274 | 44.14 | 1st | |
| Sarnia—Lambton | Henk Vanden Ende | | 11,852 | 30.99 | 2nd | |
| Sault Ste. Marie | Bruce Willson | | 2,674 | 7.61 | 3rd | |
| Scarborough—Agincourt | Yolanda Chan | | 11,337 | 30.08 | 2nd | |
| Scarborough Centre | Marilyn Mushinski | | 11,686 | 28.04 | 2nd | Incumbent |
| Scarborough East | Steve Gilchrist | | 14,323 | 33.84 | 2nd | Incumbent |
| Scarborough—Rouge River | Kevin Moore | | 9,468 | 25.21 | 2nd | |
| Scarborough Southwest | Dan Newman | | 11,826 | 31.71 | 2nd | Incumbent; Associate Minister of Health and Long-Term Care |
| Simcoe—Grey | Jim Wilson | | 26,114 | 51.47 | 1st | Incumbent; Minister of Northern Development and Mines and Minister of Environment |
| Simcoe North | Garfield Dunlop | | 23,393 | 46.13 | 1st | Incumbent |
| St. Catharines | Mark Brickell | Regional Councillor | 12,932 | 29.34 | 2nd | |
| St. Paul's | Charis Kelso | | 11,203 | 24.65 | 2nd | |
| Stoney Creek | Brad Clark | | 19,517 | 38.58 | 2nd | Incumbent; Minister of Labour |
| Stormont—Dundas—Charlottenburgh | Todd Lalonde | | 13,948 | 36.50 | 2nd | |
| Sudbury | Mila Wong | Executive Director | 5,068 | 14.19 | 2nd | Ran in the same division in the 1999 Ontario general election. Also ran for the Greater Sudbury municipal council in the 2000 Greater Sudbury municipal election. |
| Thornhill | Tina Molinari | | 20,623 | 45.16 | 2nd | Incumbent; Associate Minister of Municipal Affairs and Housing with responsibility for Urban Affairs |
| Thunder Bay—Atikokan | Brian McKinnon | | 5,365 | 17.62 | 3rd | |
| Thunder Bay—Superior North | Brent Sylvester | | 2,912 | 9.62 | 3rd | |
| Timiskaming—Cochrane | Rick Brassard | | 6,330 | 20.38 | 2nd | |
| Timmins—James Bay | Merv Russell | | 2,527 | 8.41 | 3rd | |
| Toronto Centre—Rosedale | John Adams | | 9,968 | 22.04 | 2nd | |
| Toronto—Danforth | George Sardelis | | 6,562 | 16.95 | 3rd | |
| Trinity—Spadina | Helena Guergis | | 4,985 | 12.29 | 3rd | |
| Vaughan—King—Aurora | Carmine Iacono | | 21,744 | 33.06 | 2nd | |
| Waterloo—Wellington | Ted Arnott | | 22,550 | 48.97 | 1st | Incumbent |
| Whitby—Ajax | Jim Flaherty | | 27,240 | 48.33 | 1st | Incumbent; Minister of Enterprise, Opportunity and Innovation; resigned seat in November 2005 |
| Willowdale | David Young | | 19,957 | 42.95 | 2nd | Incumbent; Minister of Municipal Affairs and Housing |
| Windsor—St. Clair | Matt Bufton | Marketing Coordinator | 4,162 | 11.61 | 3rd | |
| Windsor West | Derek Insley | | 4,187 | 11.90 | 3rd | Ran in Ottawa West in 1987 Ontario general election. |
| York Centre | Dan Cullen | | 7,862 | 24.83 | 2nd | |
| York North | Julia Munro | | 24,517 | 47.19 | 1st | Incumbent |
| York South—Weston | Stephen Halicki | | 4,930 | 15.23 | 3rd | |
| York West | Ted Aver | | 2,330 | 10.03 | 3rd | |

== Candidates in by-elections held between 2003 and 2007 ==
| Date | Riding | Candidate's Name | Occupation | Votes | % | Rank | Notes |
|---|---|---|---|---|---|---|---|
| 2004 05 13 | Hamilton East | Tara Crugnale | | 1,772 | 7.42 | 3rd | |
| 2005 03 17 | Dufferin—Peel—Wellington—Grey | John Tory | | 15,893 | 56.67 | 1st | Party leader |
| 2005 11 25 | Scarborough—Rouge River | Cynthia Lai | | 4,268 | 25.86 | 2nd | |
| 2006 03 30 | Nepean—Carleton | Lisa MacLeod | | 17,312 | 57.57 | 1st | |
| 2006 03 30 | Scarborough—Rouge River | Georgina Blanas | | 2,740 | 10.03 | 3rd | |
| 2006 03 30 | Whitby—Ajax | Christine Elliott | | 15,799 | 46.21 | 1st | |
| 2006 09 14 | Parkdale—High Park | David Hutcheon | | 4,943 | 17.33 | 3rd | |
| 2007 02 08 | Burlington | Joyce Savoline | | 11,146 | 49.00 | 1st | |
| 2007 02 08 | Markham | Alex Yuan | | 6,426 | 34.89 | 2nd | |
| 2007 02 08 | York South—Weston | Pina Martino | | 1,917 | 10.18 | 3rd | |

Source for election results: Election Results, Elections Ontario, accessed 2 November 2021.
