= Shafiq Qaadri =

Canadian politician

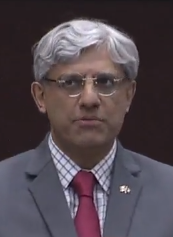
- Qaadri in 2018

Member of the Ontario Provincial Parliament for Etobicoke North
- In office October 2, 2003 – June 7, 2018
- Preceded by: John Hastings
- Succeeded by: Doug Ford

Personal details
- Born: 1963 (age 62–63) Chicago, Illinois, U.S.
- Party: Ontario Liberal
- Education: University of Toronto
- Profession: Physician; politician

Muhammad Shafiq Qaadri (born c. 1963) is a Canadian physician and former politician who represented Etobicoke North in the Legislative Assembly of Ontario from 2003 to 2018, sitting as a member of the Ontario Liberal Party. Qaadri is the first person of Pakistani origin to serve as a member of Provincial Parliament (MPP) in Ontario.

== Early life and education ==
Qaadri was born in Chicago. His parents had immigrated from Pakistan. The family moved to Toronto in the 1970s.

Qaadri graduated from Upper Canada College in 1982, and from the University of Toronto Medical School in 1988. During his academic career, he won several scholarships including an English-Speaking Union Essay Prize to Oxford University and a Medical Research Council Scholarship in Clinical Neurosurgery.

=== Family ===
Qaadri lives in Toronto with his wife and three children.

== Medical career ==
Before entering political life, Qaadri was commentator in the Canadian media for his discussions of medical issues (which he usually presented in a populist manner, intended for non-specialists). Qaadri has been granted the position of Designated Medical Practitioner by the Canadian government.

His book The Testosterone Factor: A Practical Guide to Improving Vitality and Virility, Naturally (ISBN 1569243786), on the subject of andropause (described as the male equivalent of menopause), was released in 2006.

He was the keynote speaker at the 40th annual convention of the Islamic Medical Association of North America in July 2007. He is also a speaker at numerous community groups in the Greater Toronto Area, teaching how about the prevention and heart disease to South Asian groups.

== Political career ==
Qaadri ran in the 1999 provincial election as the Liberal candidate in the riding of Etobicoke North. He lost to Progressive Conservative John Hastings by 1,446 votes in Etobicoke North. Hastings announced his retirement in 2003, and Qaadri was able to win the riding by nearly 10,000 votes in the election that followed. He was reelected in 2007, 2011 and 2014. Qaadri is the first person of Pakistani origin to become a Member of Provincial Parliament in Ontario.

=== In the Legislature ===
On October 23, 2003, he was named Parliamentary Assistant (PA) to Marie Bountrogianni in her capacity as Minister of Children and Youth Services. In 2007 he was named as PA to the Minister of Health Promotion and in 2011 as the PA to the Minister of Government Services.

In 2004, while working on recruiting new civil servants, he was quoted as saying "there's just too many white people" in Ontario's government agencies.

In May 2010, a rally against government cuts to pharmaceutical spending was held outside his governmental office. Protesters stated, "He is a doctor. We thought he should be saying something."

In September 2013, Qaadri introduced Bill 96, The Radon Awareness and Prevention Act. The bill would increase public awareness of the dangers of radon gas and mandate monitoring in all provincial buildings in the province.

As of July 2014, he served as Parliamentary Assistant to the Premier of Ontario.

In May 2015, Qaadri tabled a petition that requested that the government withdraw its policy of only purchasing BlackBerry smartphones for MPPs and their staff. It requested that other devices such as iPhones and Android smartphones be allowed. This was not the first petition on the topic by Qaadri, a similar petition with different language was tabled in April 2014. John Chen, CEO of BlackBerry Ltd., released a statement demanding an apology because the language of the petition "reflects poorly on all of Canada". Fellow MPP Daiene Vernile emphasized that Qaadri's petition is only his individual opinion and the Liberal government is "a strong supporter" of BlackBerry, and PC MPP Michael Harris said "if he wants the latest Apple apps he can do it on his own dime". Qaadri issued an apology in a Twitter post the following week, saying "I want to offer my sincere apologies for any offence caused by the language in my petition on technology last week".

On May 28, 2018, during the 2018 provincial election campaign, Shafiq and several Liberal staffers crashed an NDP rally in Etobicoke North hosted by leader Andrea Horwath, interrupting the event with shouting and displaying a large Liberal campaign sign. Qaadri initially denied that his stunt was pre-planned, but later apologized for his actions being "rash and inexcusable". He was subsequently defeated in the election, coming third behind Progressive Conservative Party leader Doug Ford and NDP candidate Mahamud Amin.

== Electoral record ==
2018 Ontario general election: Etobicoke North
Party	Candidate	Votes	%	±%
Progressive Conservative	Doug Ford	19,055	52.48	+29.94
New Democratic	Mahamud Amin	9,210	25.37	–0.30
Liberal	Shafiq Qaadri	6,601	18.18	–27.47
Green	Nancy Kaur Ghuman	1,026	2.83	+0.40
Libertarian	Brianne Lefebvre	414	1.14	–
Total valid votes		36,306	98.89	
Total rejected, unmarked and declined ballots		407	1.11	
Turnout		36,713	50.58	
Eligible voters		72,580		
Progressive Conservative notional gain from Liberal		Swing		+15.12
Source: Elections Ontario

2014 Ontario general election: Etobicoke North
Party	Candidate	Votes	%	±%
Liberal	Shafiq Qaadri	12,168	44.90	–3.55
New Democratic	Nigel Barriffe	7,103	26.21	+4.45
Progressive Conservative	Tony Milone	6,163	22.74	–1.61
Libertarian	Allan deRoo	706	2.61	–
Green	Kenny Robertson	677	2.50	+0.33
Freedom	James McConnell	281	1.04	–0.25
Total valid votes		27,098	98.69	
Total rejected, unmarked and declined ballots		360	1.31	+0.71
Turnout		27,458	42.71	+2.56
Eligible voters		64,284		
Liberal hold		Swing		–4.00
Source: Elections Ontario

2011 Ontario general election: Etobicoke North
Party	Candidate	Votes	%	±%
Liberal	Shafiq Qaadri	12,081	48.46	–6.39
Progressive Conservative	Karm Singh	6,072	24.36	+3.35
New Democratic	Vrind Sharma	5,426	21.76	+6.91
Green	Gurleen Gill	541	2.17	–2.58
Family Coalition	Claudio Ceolin	391	1.57	–2.98
Freedom	James McConnell	320	1.28	–
Paramount Canadians	Gopal Baghel	100	0.40	–
Total valid votes		24,931	99.40	
Total rejected, unmarked and declined ballots		151	0.60	–1.13
Turnout		25,082	40.15	–5.04
Eligible voters		62,472		
Liberal hold		Swing		–4.87
Source: Elections Ontario

2007 Ontario general election: Etobicoke North
Party	Candidate	Votes	%	±%
Liberal	Shafiq Qaadri	15,147	54.85	+0.87
Progressive Conservative	Mohamed Kassim	5,801	21.01	–1.51
New Democratic	Mohamed Boudjenane	4,101	14.85	+3.50
Green	Jama Korshel	1,312	4.75	+3.13
Family Coalition	Teresa Ceolin	1,255	4.54	+0.43
Total valid votes		27,616	98.26	
Total rejected, unmarked and declined ballots		488	1.74	+0.45
Turnout		28,104	45.19	–2.72
Eligible voters		62,196		
Liberal hold		Swing		+1.19
Source: Elections Ontario

2003 Ontario general election: Etobicoke North
Party	Candidate	Votes	%	±%
Liberal	Shafiq Qaadri	16,727	53.98	+19.95
Progressive Conservative	Bal Gosal	6,978	22.52	–15.75
New Democratic	Kuldip Singh Sodhi	3,516	11.35	–12.57
Independent	Frank Acri	1,990	6.42	–
Family Coalition	Teresa Ceolin	1,275	4.11	+2.42
Green	Mir Kamal	503	1.62	–
Total valid votes		30,989	98.71	
Total rejected, unmarked and declined ballots		405	1.29	–0.18
Turnout		31,394	47.91	–7.01
Eligible voters		65,527		
Liberal gain from Progressive Conservative		Swing		+17.85
Source: Elections Ontario

1999 Ontario general election: Etobicoke North
Party	Candidate	Votes	%
Progressive Conservative	John Hastings	13,065	38.27
Liberal	Shafiq Qaadri	11,619	34.03
New Democratic	Ed Philip	8,166	23.92
Family Coalition	Mark Stefanini	580	1.70
Independent	Diane Johnston	489	1.43
Natural Law	Marilyn Pepper	223	0.65
Total valid votes		34,142	98.53
Total rejected, unmarked and declined ballots		509	1.47
Turnout		34,651	54.92
Eligible voters		63,095	
Progressive Conservative pickup new district.			
Source: Elections Ontario
