= John Hastings (Ontario politician) =

Canadian politician (1942–2024)

Toronto Public School Trustee for Ward 1 Etobicoke North
- In office December 1, 2006 – December 1, 2014
- Preceded by: Stan Nemiroff
- Succeeded by: Michael Ford

Ontario MPP
- In office 1999–2003
- Preceded by: Riding established
- Succeeded by: Shafiq Qaadri
- Constituency: Etobicoke North
- In office 1995–1999
- Preceded by: Ed Philip
- Succeeded by: Riding abolished
- Constituency: Etobicoke—Rexdale

Personal details
- Born: John Edward Hastings; March 16, 1942 Collingwood, Ontario, Canada
- Died: May 15, 2024 (aged 82)
- Party: Progressive Conservative
- Occupation: Teacher

John Edward Hastings (March 16, 1942 – May 15, 2024) was a Canadian politician in Ontario, Canada. He was a Progressive Conservative member of the Legislative Assembly of Ontario from 1995 to 2003.

== Background ==
Hastings earned degrees from the University of Western Ontario (1963) and the University of Toronto (1967). He worked as a political researcher and as a teacher in Ontario's Secondary School system. In 1975, he worked as executive assistant to provincial cabinet minister Lorne Henderson. Hastings was a member of the Worker's Compensation Board from 1977 to 1994 and also served on the advisory board of the Institute of Study of Antisocial Behaviour in Youth before entering public life.

== Politics ==
Hastings ran for Toronto's Hydro Commission in 1985 and was elected to the second position. He was elected to the Etobicoke City Council in 1988, and held this position until 1995.

Hastings was elected to the Ontario legislature in the 1995 provincial election, defeating long-serving New Democrat Ed Philip by fewer than 1,000 votes in Etobicoke—Rexdale. In 1997, he was appointed a parliamentary assistant to the minister of transportation.

In the 1999 provincial election, Hastings ran for re-election in the redistributed riding of Etobicoke North and retained his seat with less than 40 per cent of the popular vote. Hastings's riding was targeted by both the Liberals and NDP, and many believe that "vote-splitting" among the opposition parties caused his re-election. In 2000, Hastings supported Stockwell Day for the leadership of the Canadian Alliance on the second ballot of the newly formed party's leadership contest.

He supported Ernie Eves to replace Harris as party leader in 2002, even though his riding executive endorsed rival candidate Jim Flaherty. Hastings rarely spoke in the legislature after Harris' retirement as premier and did not seek re-election in 2003.

On November 13, 2006, Hastings was elected to the Toronto District School Board as Trustee for Ward 1 (Etobicoke North), defeating incumbent Stan Nemiroff. Hastings took office in December 2006. He was re-elected in 2010 but was defeated in 2014 by Michael Ford who was fifty-two years his junior, the nephew of then-Mayor Rob Ford and then-councillor Doug Ford. After 17 months, Michael Ford vacated his school board seat to run for the municipal council seat held by Rob Ford at his death. Hastings sought to regain the school board seat in the 2016 by-election but was defeated by business owner Avtar Minhas.

Hastings died on May 15, 2024, at the age of 82.
