= 1999 Ontario general election =

Canadian provincial election

- June 3, 1999

103 seats in the 37th Legislative Assembly of Ontario 52 seats needed for a majority
- Turnout: 58.35% (▼3.79pp)
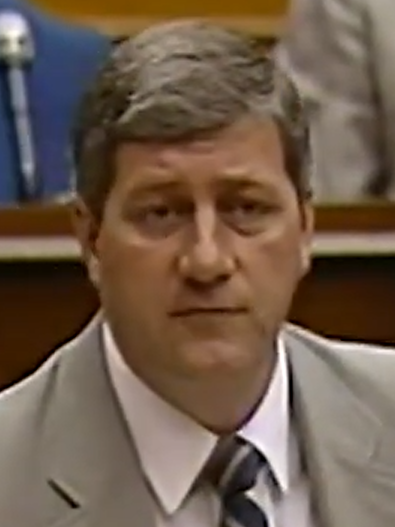

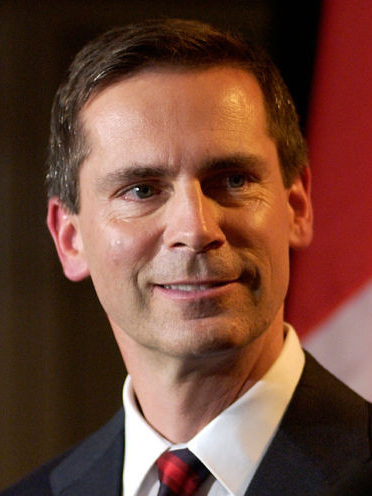

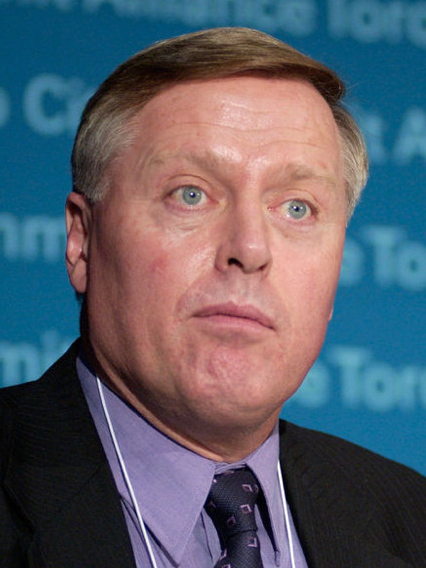
	First party	Second party	Third party
Leader	Mike Harris	Dalton McGuinty	Howard Hampton
Party	Progressive Conservative	Liberal	New Democratic
Leader since	May 12, 1990	December 1, 1996	June 22, 1996
Leader's seat	Nipissing	Ottawa South	Kenora—Rainy River
Last election	82	30	17
Seats won	59	35	9
Seat change	▼23	▲5	▼8
Popular vote	1,978,059	1,751,472	551,009
Percentage	45.1%	39.9%	12.6%
Swing	▲0.3pp	▲8.8pp	▼8.0pp
- Popular vote by riding. As this is an FPTP election, seat totals are not determined by popular vote, but instead via results by each riding.
Premier before election
Mike Harris
Progressive Conservative
Premier after election
Mike Harris
Progressive Conservative

General elections were held on June 3, 1999, to elect members of the 37th Legislative Assembly of the Canadian province Ontario.

The governing Progressive Conservative Party of Ontario (PC), led by Premier Mike Harris, was re-elected to a second majority government.

== Redistribution of representation ==
The size of Ontario's legislature was reduced by a fifth, from 130 to 103 Members of Provincial Parliaments (MPPs), through this election. The last time the Legislative Assembly of Ontario had experienced a reduced number of seats heading into an election was in 1934, when the legislature was reduced from 112 to 90 seats.

Previously from the 1886 provincial election onward, the province's electoral boundaries were different from those used in federal elections. Since the 1896 provincial election there has consistently been more provincial electoral districts (or "ridings" colloquially in English Canada) than federal electoral districts in Ontario. The difference in numbers peaked when the 1975 provincial election returned 125 MPPs compared to the 88 Ontario MPs returned in the federal election a year earlier.

During the 1995 election campaign, the Progressive Conservative Party pledged, among many reforms aimed to reduce the size of government proposed in its 1995 election platform Common Sense Revolution, to reduce the number of provincial and municipal politicians. In December, 1996, the Fewer Politicians Act, 1996 came into effect and updated the Representation Act to make provincial electoral districts identical to federal electoral districts.

While the reduction of seats was among the less contentious measures implemented by the incumbent PC government, it carries with it significance political consequences to the political landscape of the province, organizational and structural consequences to the three political parties represented in the legislature, and life consequences to the incumbent MPPs and their staff.

=== Reduction of seats ===
The reduction of 27 seats was felt across the provinces. With the exception of two regional municipalities, all regions and areas of provinces saw a reduction of representation The reduction was particularly severe for Northern Ontario and City of Toronto, two areas where the oppositions parties are relatively strong. With explosive population growth through much of the 1980s and 1990s, York Region and Peel Region were the only exception to the reduction, gaining 2 and 1 new seats respectively. Conincidentally, the PC swept both regions.

	Seats		±%
	Prior	1999	±%
Southwest	18	14	-22%
Windsor to London	13	10	-23%
Midwestern	5	4	-20%
South Central	22	17	-23%
Grand River	3	2	-33%
Waterloo	7	6	-14%
Hamilton Niagara	12	9	-25%
Greater Toronto	21	22	5%
York Simcoe	6	8	33%
Durham Ontario	5	4	-20%
Halton Peel	10	10	0%
Toronto	30	22	-27%
Old Toronto, York, East York	12	9	-25%
North York	8	5	-38%
Scarborough	6	5	-17%
Etobicoke	4	3	-25%
Eastern Ontario	22	17	-23%
Central East	8	6	-25%
St Lawrence Valley	6	5	-17%
Ottawa	8	6	-25%
Northern Ontario	17	11	-35%
Northeastern	9	6	-33%
Northwestern	5	3	-40%
North Bay - Muskoka	3	2	-33%

=== Faceoff between incumbents ===
The elimination of such large numbers of ridings resulted in many incumbent MPPs directly facing each other for the new seats. In a number of instances, MPPs from the same party had to compete for their party's nomination.

With eight fewer seats among them, Toronto incumbents faced the most chaotic nomination landscape as many of them saw their former electoral districts broken up into multiple significant but non-majority pieces and distributed to three or more new districts each with another incumbent claiming majority. For example, education minister David Johnson saw 39% of his former Don Mills riding went to Beaches—East York (which also consisted of 95% of NDP Frances Lankin's former Beaches—Woodbine riding), 36% went to Don Valley West (also consist of 46% of cabinet colleague David Turnbull's former York Mills riding, along with over a third of the former riding of two other caucus colleagues) and only 25% went to Don Valley East (also consisted of 73% of Liberal David Caplan's former riding of Oriole), the riding where he ultimately met his defeat.

With eighty-two incumbent members, the Progressive Conservative Party saw six nomination contests between incumbent MPPs, mostly fought by lower profile backbenchers. The exception was the contest that pitted Doug Ford Sr, father of future premier Doug Ford, against legislative speaker Chris Stockwell, during which the future premier, then referred to as Doug Ford Jr., was prominently featured for his allegation that Stockwell supporters has rigged the rules to require members to prove their residential address.

With a concentration of its caucus members in Toronto, the Liberal Party faced grave risk of having multiple acrimonious internal contests. It has largely avoided such predicaments through an informal system where members with seniority were given priority. Senior members were urged to declare their intentions early, and junior members interested in same district were leaned upon to select another districts in exchange for being shielded from non-caucus challengers. This led to 1996 leadership contest runner up Gerrard Kenney yielding York South—Weston, the recipient district of 81% of Kennedy's York South, to Joseph Cordiano, the former leadership rival who delivered the final blow to his leadership bid. In the end, there was only one contest among Liberal MPPs, a highly acrimonious battle between Annamarie Castrilli, a contestant in the party's 1996 leadership contest, and Monte Kwinter, a minister in the Peterson ministry, for the new electoral district of York Centre. Following her nomination defeat, Castrilli switched over the PCs on the day the election writ was issued, and was nominated to challenge Kennedy in the general election. Her subsequent defeat made her the only incumbent to have been twice defeated by fellow MPPs in this election cycle.

The general election featured sixteen contests with two incumbent MPPs from different parties, many of them high profile members. The Liberals were most successful in defending their MPPs. In the twelves contests they were part of, incumbent Liberals won all nine against PC incumbents PCs, and two of the three against NDP incumbents. The only contest they lost was to NDP leader Howard Hampton. The opposite was true for the governing PC. In the thirteen contests featuring incumbent MPPs as PC candidates, they prevailed in only two, both over NDP incumbents (though one of them was a former Liberal turncoat). NDP incumbent were featured in seven of these contest, winning three and losing four. Notable casualties of contests between incumbents included:

- David Johnson, incumbent education minister, defeated by Liberal MPP David Caplan, son Elinor Caplan of the Peterson ministry and himself a future minister in the McGuinty ministry
- Noble Villeneuve, incumbent agriculture minister, defeated by Liberal MPP John Cleary
- Marion Boyd, Attorney General in the NDP Rae ministry, defeated by incumbent minister Dianne Cunningham
- Tony Silipo, education minister in the NDP Rae ministry, defeated by Tony Ruprecht, briefly a minister without portfolio in the Peterson ministry

==== List of nomination contests between incumbent MPPs ====
(Percentage in bracket behind each incumbent's former district indicates the proportion of the former electoral district's voters transferred to the electoral district being contested.)

Electoral District	Defeated Incumbent	Nominated incumbent	Reported Tallies
Etobicoke Centre	Doug Ford (Etobicoke—Humber) 57%	Chris Stockwell (Etobicoke West) 63%	Stockwell 768; Ford 508
Hastings—Frontenac— Lennox and Addington	Bill Vankoughnet (Frontenac—Addington) 54%	Harry Danford (Hastings—Peterborough) 52% (Note: Danford was subsequently defeated by Liberal challenger Leona Dombrowsky)	
Prince Edward—-Hastings	Doug Rollins (Quinte) 77%	Gary Fox (Prince Edward—Lennox) 59% (Note: (Fox was subsequently defeated by Liberal challenger Ernie Parsons))	Rollins ~ 500; Fox ~900
Huron—Bruce	Barbara Fisher (Bruce) 53%	Helen Johns (Huron—Bruce) 100%	
Kitchener Centre	Gary Leadston (Kitchener—Wilmot) 54%	Wayne Wettlaufer (Kitchener) 65%	670 voted "decisively for Wettlaufer"
Oakville	Terence Young (Halton Centre) 33%	Gary Carr (Oakville South) 87%	Carr 651; Young 432
York Centre	Annamarie Castrilli (Downsview) 68%	Monte Kwinter (Wilson Heights) 68%	Kwinter 1,264; Castrilli 1,001

==== List of election contests between incumbent MPPs ====
(Percentage in bracket behind each incumbent's former district indicates the proportion of the former electoral district's voters transferred to the electoral district being contested.)

Electoral District	Defeated Incumbent	Defeated by
Eastern Ontario
Ottawa West—Nepean	Alex Cullen (Ottawa West) 77% (Note: Cullen was previously elected in a 1997 byelection as a Liberal succeeding Bob Chiarelli. He lost the Liberal nomination to Nepean councillor Rick Chiarelli, a cousin of Bob, and was later expelled from the Liberal party caucus. He came in third behind Guzzo and Chiarelli.)	Garry Guzzo (Ottawa—Rideau) 21%
Renfrew—Nipissing—Pembroke	Leo Jordan (Lanark—Renfrew) 32%	Sean Conway (Renfrew North) 100%
Stormont—Dundas—Charlottenburgh	Noble Villeneuve (Stormont—Dundas—Glengarry and East Grenville) 50%	John Cleary (Cornwall) 100%
Central Ontario
Hamilton East	Peter Preston (Brant—Haldimand) 0%	Dominic Agostino (Hamilton East) 100%
Hamilton West	Lillian Ross (Hamilton West) 80%	David Christopherson (Hamilton Centre) 60%
Niagara Centre	Frank Sheehan (Lincoln) 29%	Peter Kormos (Welland—Thorold) 96%
St. Catharines	Tom Froese (St. Catharines—Brock) 51%	Jim Bradley (St. Catharines) 100%
Toronto
Davenport	Tony Silipo (Dovercourt) 55%	Tony Ruprecht (Parkdale) 36%
Don Valley East	David Johnson (Don Mills) 25%	David Caplan (Oriole) 73%
Eglinton—Lawrence	John Parker (York East) 0%	Mike Colle (Oakwood) 38%
Parkdale—High Park	Annamarie Castrilli (Downsview) 0%	Gerard Kennedy (York South) 19%
Scarborough—Agincourt	Jim Brown (Scarborough West) 0%	Gerry Phillips (Scarborough—Agincourt) 100%
Southwestern Ontario
Chatham-Kent—Essex	Jack Carroll (Chatham—Kent) 59%	Pat Hoy (Essex—Kent) 46%
London North Centre	Marion Boyd (London Centre) 40%	Dianne Cunningham (London North) 67%
Northern Ontario
Kenora—Rainy River	Frank Miclash (Kenora) 100%	Howard Hampton (Rainy River) 67%
Timiskaming—Cochrane	Len Wood (Cochrane North) 18%	David Ramsay (Timiskaming) 99%

=== Faceoff avoided ===
There were significant effort among caucus colleagues to coordinate their riding choices to avoid contesting against each other. The following incumbent MPPs would have had to compete with a fellow MPP for a new district consisted of the entirety or a substantial portion of their old district, but opted to retire or contest a different electoral district consist of much smaller portion of their former electoral district. Four PC incumbents opted to contest entirely different electoral districts, and one of them, cabinet minister Frank Klees, was successful in getting reelected in his new electoral turf of Oak Ridges.

Electoral District	Yielded incumbent	Would have been competing with	Outcome
Eastern Ontario
Lanark-Carleton	Leo Jordan (Lanark—Renfrew) 68%	Norman Sterling (Carleton) 57%	Contested Renfrew—Nipissing—Pembroke (consisted of 32% of Lanark—Renfrew) (defeated, by another incumbent)
Central Ontario
York North	Frank Klees (York—Mackenzie) 57%	Julia Munro (Durham—York) 53%	Contested Oak Ridges (new seat, consisted of 0% of York—Mackenzie) (elected)
Burlington	Terence Young (Halton Centre) 31% / 36%	Cam Jackson (Burlington South) 81%	Contested PC Nomination for Oakville (consisted of 33% of Halton Centre) (defeated, by another incumbent)
Halton	Terence Young (Halton Centre) 31% / 36%	Ted Chudleigh (Halton North) 100%	Contested PC Nomination for Oakville (consisted of 33% of Halton Centre) (defeated, by another incumbent)
Haldimand—Norfolk—Brant	Peter Preston (Brant—Haldimand) 44%	Toby Barrett (Norfolk) 84%	Contested Hamilton East (consisted of 0% of Haldimand—Norfolk—Brant) (defeated, by another incumbent)
Toronto
Beaches—East York	John Parker (York East) 41% / 41% / 38%	Frances Lankin (Beaches—Woodbine) 95%	Contested Eglinton—Lawrence (consisted of 0% of York East) (defeated, by another incumbent)
Broadview—Greenwood	John Parker (York East) 41% / 41% / 38%	Marilyn Churley (Riverdale) 100%	Contested Eglinton—Lawrence (consisted of 0% of York East) (defeated, by another incumbent)
Don Valley West	John Parker (York East) 41% / 41% / 38%	David Turnbull (York Mills) 46%	Contested Eglinton—Lawrence (consisted of 0% of York East) (defeated, by another incumbent)
Beaches—East York	David Johnson (Don Mills) 39% / 36%	Frances Lankin (Beaches—Woodbine) 100%	Contested Don Valley East (consisted of 25% of Don Mills) (defeated, by another incumbent)
Don Valley West	David Johnson (Don Mills) 39% / 36%	David Turnbull (York Mills) 46%	Contested Don Valley East (consisted of 25% of Don Mills) (defeated, by another incumbent)
Eglinton—Lawrence	Joe Cordiano (Lawrence) 52%	Mike Colle (Oakwood) 38%	Contested York South—Weston (elected) (consisted of 48% of Lawrence)
York South—Weston	Gerard Kennedy (York South) 81%	Joe Cordiano (Lawrence) 48%	Contested Parkdale—High Park (consisted of 19% of York South) (elected, over another incumbent)
Parkdale—High Park	Tony Ruprecht (Parkdale) 59%	Gerard Kennedy (York South) 19%	Contested Davenport (consisted of 59% of Parkdale) (elected, over another incumbent)
Parkdale—High Park	Tony Ruprecht (Parkdale) 59%	Derwyn Shea (High Park—Swansea) 87%	Contested Davenport (consisted of 59% of Parkdale) (elected, over another incumbent)
Parkdale—High Park	Derwyn Shea (High Park—Swansea) 87%	~~Tony Ruprecht (Parkdale) 59%~~; Gerard Kennedy (York South) 19%	Retired
St. Paul's	Mike Colle (Oakwood) 32%	Isabel Bassett (St. Andrew—St. Patrick) 46% or Bill Saunderson (Eglinton) 44%	Contested Eglinton—Lawrence (consisted of 38% of Oakwood) (elected, over another incumbent)
St. Paul's	Bill Saunderson (Eglinton) 46% / 34%	Isabel Bassett (St. Andrew—St. Patrick) 44%	Retired
Eglinton—Lawrence	Bill Saunderson (Eglinton) 46% / 34%	~~Joe Cordiano (Lawrence) 52%~~; Mike Colle (Oakwood) 38%	Retired
Scarborough Southwest	Jim Brown (Scarborough West) 71%	Dan Newman (Scarborough Centre) 56%	Contested Scarborough—Agincourt (consisted of 0% of Scarborough Southwest) (defeated, by another incumbent)
Southwestern Ontario
Elgin—Middlesex—London	Peter North (Elgin) 100%	Bruce Smith (Middlesex) 18% (Note: Subsequently defeated by Liberal challenger Steve Peters)	Retired
Northern Ontario
Algoma—Manitoulin	Bud Wildman (Algoma) 100%	Michael Brown (Algoma—Manitoulin) 100%	Retired
Parry Sound—Muskoka	Bill Grimmett (Muskoka—Georgian Bay) 66%	Ernie Eves (Parry Sound) 63%	Retired
Thunder Bay—Superior North	Gilles Pouliot (Lake Nipigon) 70%	Michael Gravelle (Port Arthur) 86%	Retired
Nickel Belt	Blain Morin (Nickel Belt) 86%	Shelley Martel (Sudbury East) 67%	Retired

== Campaign ==
The Ontario Legislature after the 1999 election.

According to a poll released on the eve of the election, the Liberal Party entered the campaign with a lead over the Progressive Conservatives. This poll's accuracy was disputed by many, however, and even Liberal leader Dalton McGuinty cast doubt on it: noting that most polling companies claim to be accurate 19 times out of 20, he suggested that this might have been the 20th. Subsequent polls taken in the early period of the campaign showed the Progressive Conservatives with a commanding lead over the Liberals, in a manner more consistent with pre-election numbers.

Harris' government had delivered large tax cuts and significantly reduced the deficit, but they had also severely cut spending in the process. They had the support of the legendary Tory political machine, bolstered by a group of American experts imported from the United States' Republican Party. They targeted Dalton McGuinty as inexperienced ("Dalton McGuinty is not up to the job" was a Tory campaign slogan), and attacked him for lacking a clear vision. This was successful due to McGuinty having a reputation for being uncomfortable and stiff in the media. During the leader's debates, McGuinty had a poor performance, being unable to explain his party's platform clearly and being compared to fictional serial killer Norman Bates by NDP leader Howard Hampton.

The extensive use of attack ads and wedge issues by the Tories was a new development in Canadian politics, and some commentators worried the election process was becoming Americanized.

The third major party, the Ontario New Democratic Party led by Howard Hampton, spent much the campaign battling the memory of Bob Rae's unpopular government in the early 1990s. Despite Hampton's efforts to reach out to labour, the NDP were substantially weakened as the major unions deserted them in favour of the Liberals, hoping to defeat the Tories by strategic voting.

The province was enjoying strong economic growth at the time which also vindicated the Conservatives' deficit-cutting measures in the public. The Liberal Party managed to recover some support late in the campaign, but it was not enough and the Tories were re-elected with a second consecutive majority government.

== Opinion polls ==
=== During campaign ===
Evolution of voting intentions at provincial level
Polling firm	Last day of survey	Source	PCO	OLP	ONDP	Other	ME	Sample
Election 1999	June 3, 1999		45.1	39.9	12.6	2.4		
Angus Reid	May 27, 1999		45	37	18	1	3.1	1,000
Angus Reid	May 14, 1999		45	41	12	2	3.1	1,000
Election called

=== During 36th Legislative Assembly ===
Evolution of voting intentions at provincial level
Polling firm	Last day of survey	Source	PCO	OLP	ONDP	Other	ME	Sample
Angus Reid	May 3, 1999		39	44	15	2	4.3	526
Angus Reid	April 18, 1999		35	47	14	5	3.1	1,000
Angus Reid	February 9, 1999		43	38	14	5	3.1	1,000
Angus Reid	December 7, 1998		41	41	13	5	3.1	1,000
Angus Reid	August 13, 1998		42	40	12	—N/a	3.2	1,000
Angus Reid	August 13, 1998		41	41	13	—N/a	3.2	1,000
Angus Reid	April 12, 1998		41	41	12	—N/a	3.2	1,000
Angus Reid	April 12, 1998		38	43	13	—N/a	3.2	1,000
Angus Reid	January 23, 1998		33	46	14	7	3.1	1,001
Angus Reid	December 7, 1997		38	43	14	—N/a	3.1	1,000
Pollara	December 1997		40	46	—N/a	—N/a	—N/a	—N/a
Angus Reid	August 14, 1997		35	42	16	6	—N/a	1,000
Angus Reid	January 27, 1997		47	34	14	5	—N/a	523
Angus Reid	December 15, 1996		44	38	13	5	3.1	1,003
Dalton McGuinty becomes leader of the OLP (December 1, 1996)
Angus Reid	September 1996		44	37	17	1	4.5	394
Angus Reid	August 1996		52	35	12	1	4.5	379
Howard Hampton becomes leader of the ONDP (June 22, 1996)
Angus Reid	June 1996		48	37	14	1	4.5	359
Angus Reid	April 1996		51	34	13	1	4.5	437
Angus Reid	January 1996		44	36	16	4	4.5	419
Angus Reid	December 1995		53	29	16	2	4.5	401
Angus Reid	October 1995		58	25	16	2	4.5	441
Angus Reid	September 1995		52	27	17	3	4.5	464
Angus Reid	July 1995		53	25	18	4	4.5	456
Angus Reid	June 1995		51	26	22	2	4.5	477
Election 1995	June 8, 1995		44.8	31.1	20.6	3.5		

=== Toronto-only ===
Polling firm	Last day of survey	Source	PCO	OLP	ONDP	Other	ME	Sample
Compas	November 16, 1998		32	49	16	—N/a	4.5	502

== Results ==
Summary of the Legislative Assembly of Ontario election results
Party	Party leader	Candidates	Seats				Popular vote		
Party	Party leader	Candidates	1995	Dissol.	1999	Change	#	%	Change
Progressive Conservative	Mike Harris	103	82	82	59	23▼	1,978,059	45.06%	0.09▲
Liberal	Dalton McGuinty	103	30	30	35	5▲	1,751,472	39.89%	8.84▲
New Democratic	Howard Hampton	103	17	17	9	8▼	550,807	12.55%	7.99▼
Independent	—N/a	62	1	1	–	1▼	26,980	0.61%	0.19▼
Green	Frank de Jong	58	–	–	–	–	30,781	0.70%	0.36▲
Family Coalition	Giuseppe Gori	37	–	–	–	–	24,216	0.55%	0.93▼
Natural Law	Ron Parker	74	–	–	–	–	19,454	0.44%	Steady
Freedom	Lloyd Walker	14	–	–	–	–	4,831	0.11%	Steady
Libertarian	Sam Apelbaum	7	–	–	–	–	2,337	0.05%	0.10▼
Communist	Hassan Husseini	4	–	–	–	–	814	0.02%	Steady
Confederation of Regions	—N/a	2	–	–	–	–	282	0.01%	0.09▼
Reform	—N/a	1	–	–	–	–	174	–	New
Total		568	130	130	103	27▼	4,390,207	100.00	
Rejected, unmarked and declined ballots							40,404		
Turnout							4,430,611		
Registered voters / turnout %							7,598,407	58.31%	3.79▼

Among the independent candidates were slates fielded by several unregistered parties:

- 27 candidates were affiliated with the Communist Party of Canada - Marxist-Leninist. These candidates won a total of 7,194 votes.
- Three were members of the Humanist Party of Ontario.

=== Vote and seat summaries ===
Ternary plots - shift of electoral support (1995-1999)
1995

1999
Electoral districts identified by colours of winning parties

Popular vote
PC	45.06%
Liberal	39.89%
New Democratic	12.55%
Others	2.50%

Seats summary
PC	57.28%
Liberal	33.98%
New Democratic	8.74%

It is possible that some independent candidates were actually members of these or other unregistered parties.

=== Synopsis of results ===
Results by riding - 1999 Ontario general election
Riding (Note: ordered as per EO reports)	Winning party							Turnout (Note: including spoilt ballots)	Votes (Note: minor political parties receiving less than 1% of the popular vote are aggregated under "Other"; independent candidates are aggregated separately)								
Riding	1st place	Votes	Share	Margin #	Margin %	2nd place	3rd place	Turnout	PC	Lib	NDP	Grn	FCP	NLP	Ind	Oth	Total
Algoma—Manitoulin	Lib	14,299	44.52%	5,519	17.18%	NDP	PC	57.98%	8,617	14,299	8,780	–	–	–	–	425	32,121
Barrie—Simcoe—Bradford	PC	33,721	64.06%	18,345	34.85%	Lib	NDP	55.55%	33,721	15,376	2,532	–	–	229	784	–	52,642
Beaches—East York	NDP	19,703	45.93%	6,927	16.15%	PC	Lib	53.64%	12,776	9,332	19,703	431	264	230	164	–	42,900
Bramalea—Gore—Malton—Springdale	PC	18,442	49.38%	3,950	10.58%	Lib	Ind	51.26%	18,442	14,492	2,204	–	–	–	2,206	–	37,344
Brampton Centre	PC	20,623	57.77%	10,629	29.78%	Lib	NDP	51.77%	20,623	9,994	5,080	–	–	–	–	–	35,697
Brampton West—Mississauga	PC	24,909	55.87%	8,310	18.64%	Lib	NDP	51.23%	24,909	16,599	2,824	–	–	252	–	–	44,584
Brant	Lib	21,166	46.98%	956	2.12%	PC	NDP	59.71%	20,210	21,166	2,889	–	–	294	495	–	45,054
Toronto—Danforth	NDP	18,150	46.92%	8,596	22.22%	PC	Lib	57.75%	9,554	9,553	18,150	–	320	565	543	–	38,685
Bruce—Grey—Owen Sound	PC	24,915	54.47%	8,776	19.19%	Lib	NDP	61.99%	24,915	16,139	2,776	373	1,540	–	–	–	45,743
Burlington	PC	29,055	62.74%	14,835	32.04%	Lib	NDP	60.46%	29,055	14,220	2,167	432	–	144	289	–	46,307
Cambridge	PC	24,583	54.84%	14,339	31.99%	Lib	NDP	56.08%	24,583	10,244	8,684	489	824	–	–	–	44,824
Davenport	Lib	13,649	49.72%	4,932	17.97%	NDP	PC	59.04%	4,346	13,649	8,717	224	–	81	164	269	27,450
Don Valley East	Lib	20,993	50.50%	3,038	7.31%	PC	NDP	61.57%	17,955	20,993	1,822	85	153	28	394	144	41,574
Don Valley West	PC	23,177	50.52%	3,169	6.91%	Lib	NDP	63.06%	23,177	20,008	2,152	–	–	224	312	–	45,873
Dufferin—Peel—Wellington—Grey	PC	30,532	64.76%	16,941	35.93%	Lib	NDP	58.62%	30,532	13,591	1,871	1,156	–	–	–	–	47,150
Durham	PC	26,103	57.07%	11,409	24.94%	Lib	NDP	58.51%	26,103	14,694	4,235	467	–	242	–	–	45,741
Eglinton—Lawrence	Lib	24,151	56.78%	9,157	21.53%	PC	NDP	60.82%	14,994	24,151	1,835	470	821	263	–	–	42,534
Elgin—Middlesex—London	Lib	20,417	46.19%	1,171	2.65%	PC	NDP	61.73%	19,246	20,417	3,455	391	–	0	284	405	44,198
Erie—Lincoln	PC	20,481	50.68%	5,878	14.55%	Lib	NDP	60.59%	20,481	14,603	3,884	–	1,009	435	–	–	40,412
Essex	Lib	25,446	56.73%	10,092	22.50%	PC	NDP	56.99%	15,354	25,446	3,745	–	–	–	307	–	44,852
Etobicoke Centre	PC	25,518	54.12%	6,483	13.75%	Lib	NDP	64.55%	25,518	19,035	1,309	375	389	316	209	–	47,151
Etobicoke—Lakeshore	PC	20,602	46.98%	4,879	11.13%	Lib	NDP	60.34%	20,602	15,723	6,457	–	423	349	299	–	43,853
Etobicoke North	PC	13,065	38.27%	1,446	4.24%	Lib	NDP	54.92%	13,065	11,619	8,166	–	580	223	489	–	34,142
Glengarry—Prescott—Russell	Lib	24,568	55.38%	7,204	16.24%	PC	NDP	60.25%	17,364	24,568	2,007	–	–	425	–	–	44,364
Ottawa—Orléans	PC	24,356	54.56%	6,304	14.12%	Lib	NDP	60.86%	24,356	18,052	1,195	614	–	177	247	–	44,641
Guelph—Wellington	PC	26,246	51.57%	9,651	18.96%	Lib	NDP	59.11%	26,246	16,595	5,907	733	1,020	–	396	–	50,897
Haldimand—Norfolk—Brant	PC	23,124	51.19%	4,820	10.67%	Lib	NDP	62.62%	23,124	18,304	2,600	413	584	148	–	–	45,173
Halton	PC	35,505	64.95%	20,738	37.94%	Lib	NDP	59.66%	35,505	14,767	2,833	806	755	–	–	–	54,666
Hamilton East	Lib	17,891	53.73%	10,477	31.46%	PC	NDP	52.72%	7,414	17,891	6,304	496	386	258	263	288	33,300
Hamilton Mountain	Lib	19,076	40.25%	2,679	5.65%	PC	NDP	62.02%	16,397	19,076	10,622	456	426	261	159	–	47,397
Hamilton West	NDP	15,625	37.84%	3,364	8.15%	PC	Lib	57.87%	12,261	12,037	15,625	495	403	231	236	–	41,288
Hastings—Frontenac—Lennox and Addington	Lib	20,395	46.74%	1,842	4.22%	PC	NDP	61.48%	18,553	20,395	3,008	576	524	382	200	–	43,638
Huron—Bruce	PC	20,772	45.75%	1,779	3.92%	Lib	NDP	66.78%	20,772	18,993	4,142	–	1,494	–	–	–	45,401
Kenora—Rainy River	NDP	14,269	44.74%	3,060	9.59%	Lib	PC	57.59%	5,483	11,209	14,269	–	–	–	934	–	31,895
Chatham-Kent—Essex	Lib	24,239	56.04%	8,001	18.50%	PC	NDP	58.80%	16,238	24,239	2,316	462	–	–	–	–	43,255
Kingston and the Islands	Lib	26,355	54.70%	11,868	24.63%	PC	NDP	54.51%	14,487	26,355	5,436	1,174	546	182	–	–	48,180
Kitchener Centre	PC	22,593	50.15%	4,609	10.23%	Lib	NDP	57.38%	22,593	17,984	3,494	561	–	204	216	–	45,052
Kitchener—Waterloo	PC	27,830	54.36%	9,796	19.13%	Lib	NDP	54.39%	27,830	18,034	3,122	836	919	135	324	–	51,200
Lambton—Kent—Middlesex	PC	19,561	45.00%	896	2.06%	Lib	NDP	60.46%	19,561	18,665	4,170	–	–	–	–	1,076	43,472
Lanark—Carleton	PC	31,364	58.40%	14,041	26.15%	Lib	NDP	58.12%	31,364	17,323	2,713	681	1,450	171	–	–	53,702
Leeds—Grenville	PC	23,390	53.10%	6,083	13.81%	Lib	NDP	61.72%	23,390	17,307	2,097	1,008	–	244	–	–	44,046
London North Centre	PC	18,320	40.21%	1,709	3.75%	NDP	Lib	55.93%	18,320	9,518	16,611	366	466	120	–	156	45,557
London—Fanshawe	PC	15,295	38.53%	1,383	3.48%	Lib	NDP	55.07%	15,295	13,912	9,788	241	–	172	–	293	39,701
London West	PC	22,761	44.92%	294	0.58%	Lib	NDP	62.63%	22,761	22,467	4,628	308	–	133	–	369	50,666
Markham	PC	26,083	62.08%	13,224	31.48%	Lib	NDP	55.33%	26,083	12,859	1,594	437	399	640	–	–	42,012
Mississauga Centre	PC	18,688	51.63%	4,116	11.37%	Lib	NDP	51.46%	18,688	14,572	1,820	–	–	1,117	–	–	36,197
Mississauga East	PC	17,688	51.58%	4,317	12.59%	Lib	NDP	52.85%	17,688	13,371	2,484	–	–	282	469	–	34,294
Mississauga South	PC	23,890	61.27%	11,615	29.79%	Lib	NDP	57.55%	23,890	12,275	2,293	–	–	–	535	–	38,993
Mississauga West	PC	26,816	57.31%	9,024	19.29%	Lib	NDP	54.46%	26,816	17,792	1,795	–	–	387	–	–	46,790
Nepean—Carleton	PC	31,546	62.31%	14,737	29.11%	Lib	NDP	61.02%	31,546	16,809	1,647	–	–	239	–	386	50,627
Niagara Centre	NDP	21,856	44.43%	4,639	9.43%	PC	Lib	63.39%	17,217	9,539	21,856	–	–	382	198	–	49,192
Niagara Falls	PC	18,497	45.70%	1,417	3.50%	Lib	NDP	59.38%	18,497	17,080	3,985	300	–	317	298	–	40,477
Nickel Belt	NDP	14,833	41.95%	4,474	12.65%	PC	Lib	59.59%	10,359	10,165	14,833	–	–	–	–	–	35,357
Nipissing	PC	19,498	50.42%	2,816	7.28%	Lib	NDP	64.81%	19,498	16,682	1,878	366	–	246	–	–	38,670
Northumberland	PC	20,535	45.99%	903	2.02%	Lib	NDP	61.19%	20,535	19,632	2,820	1,194	370	99	–	–	44,650
Oak Ridges	PC	30,432	59.99%	13,005	25.64%	Lib	NDP	56.56%	30,432	17,427	1,957	914	–	–	–	–	50,730
Oakville	PC	27,767	61.90%	13,078	29.16%	Lib	NDP	60.49%	27,767	14,689	1,667	–	530	202	–	–	44,855
Oshawa	PC	18,915	46.75%	7,175	17.73%	Lib	NDP	52.40%	18,915	11,740	9,154	–	–	651	–	–	40,460
Ottawa Centre	Lib	17,956	38.17%	2,553	5.43%	PC	NDP	52.96%	15,403	17,956	11,977	1,231	–	170	132	174	47,043
Ottawa South	Lib	22,707	49.59%	3,370	7.36%	PC	NDP	57.74%	19,337	22,707	2,655	724	–	121	243	–	45,787
Ottawa—Vanier	Lib	21,009	53.03%	8,404	21.21%	PC	NDP	49.12%	12,605	21,009	4,163	953	–	580	310	–	39,620
Ottawa West—Nepean	PC	22,834	47.79%	6,415	13.43%	Lib	NDP	58.89%	22,834	16,419	7,701	453	–	70	223	79	47,779
Oxford	PC	22,726	53.25%	7,566	17.73%	Lib	NDP	60.96%	22,726	15,160	3,077	–	875	203	–	633	42,674
Parkdale—High Park	Lib	23,022	54.92%	10,375	24.75%	PC	NDP	60.45%	12,647	23,022	4,937	500	289	99	99	325	41,918
Parry Sound—Muskoka	PC	22,967	57.97%	11,997	30.28%	Lib	NDP	61.10%	22,967	10,970	5,343	–	–	339	–	–	39,619
Perth—Middlesex	PC	22,065	52.00%	6,637	15.64%	Lib	NDP	60.25%	22,065	15,428	3,053	–	1,369	–	–	521	42,436
Peterborough	PC	24,422	44.99%	2,602	4.79%	Lib	NDP	62.77%	24,422	21,820	7,058	598	–	106	276	–	54,280
Pickering—Ajax—Uxbridge	PC	28,661	58.19%	11,780	23.92%	Lib	NDP	59.63%	28,661	16,881	2,814	703	–	191	–	–	49,250
Prince Edward—Hastings	Lib	17,987	45.11%	56	0.14%	PC	NDP	56.98%	17,931	17,987	2,877	441	–	111	321	203	39,871
Renfrew—Nipissing—Pembroke	Lib	23,435	53.35%	5,697	12.97%	PC	NDP	61.23%	17,738	23,435	2,295	287	–	172	–	–	43,927
Sarnia—Lambton	Lib	19,440	48.91%	2,761	6.95%	PC	NDP	60.17%	16,679	19,440	3,110	–	–	–	–	517	39,746
Sault Ste. Marie	NDP	15,949	43.23%	5,472	14.83%	PC	Lib	62.07%	10,477	10,180	15,949	–	–	288	–	–	36,894
Scarborough—Agincourt	Lib	18,698	50.70%	2,783	7.55%	PC	NDP	56.62%	15,915	18,698	1,319	451	–	129	371	–	36,883
Scarborough Centre	PC	18,189	43.12%	3,624	8.59%	Lib	NDP	58.24%	18,189	14,565	8,399	–	573	455	–	–	42,181
Scarborough East	PC	20,686	49.50%	3,602	8.62%	Lib	NDP	59.45%	20,686	17,084	2,853	–	457	135	205	368	41,788
Scarborough—Rouge River	Lib	20,052	57.25%	7,991	22.82%	PC	NDP	52.78%	12,061	20,052	2,138	–	489	284	–	–	35,024
Scarborough Southwest	PC	15,349	39.76%	2,357	6.11%	Lib	NDP	58.16%	15,349	12,992	8,962	466	495	339	–	–	38,603
Simcoe—Grey	PC	31,984	66.00%	19,169	39.56%	Lib	NDP	60.21%	31,984	12,815	3,662	–	–	–	–	–	48,461
Simcoe North	PC	26,160	53.15%	6,951	14.12%	Lib	NDP	59.88%	26,160	19,209	2,913	633	–	305	–	–	49,220
St. Catharines	Lib	25,186	53.90%	7,192	15.39%	PC	NDP	59.61%	17,994	25,186	2,902	215	–	272	154	–	46,723
St. Paul's	Lib	23,755	50.57%	4,782	10.18%	PC	NDP	59.89%	18,973	23,755	3,350	326	–	188	378	–	46,970
Stoney Creek	PC	21,462	45.56%	2,622	5.57%	Lib	NDP	62.10%	21,462	18,840	4,922	–	1,206	330	350	–	47,110
Stormont—Dundas—Charlottenburgh	Lib	20,275	47.99%	640	1.51%	PC	NDP	61.36%	19,635	20,275	2,012	–	–	329	–	–	42,251
Sudbury	Lib	21,732	58.71%	10,784	29.13%	PC	NDP	55.69%	10,948	21,732	3,891	–	–	184	262	–	37,017
Thornhill	PC	19,580	48.21%	343	0.84%	Lib	NDP	58.69%	19,580	19,237	1,438	360	–	–	–	–	40,615
Thunder Bay—Atikokan	Lib	20,268	64.03%	14,187	44.82%	PC	NDP	55.47%	6,081	20,268	5,304	–	–	–	–	–	31,653
Thunder Bay—Superior North	Lib	19,249	60.90%	13,385	42.35%	NDP	PC	54.94%	5,683	19,249	5,864	382	–	–	431	–	31,609
Timiskaming—Cochrane	Lib	16,877	48.38%	6,503	18.64%	PC	NDP	63.25%	10,374	16,877	7,631	–	–	–	–	–	34,882
Timmins—James Bay	NDP	16,504	52.90%	6,266	20.09%	Lib	PC	57.41%	4,139	10,238	16,504	–	–	–	316	–	31,197
Toronto Centre—Rosedale	Lib	17,756	38.90%	4,116	9.02%	PC	Ind	57.04%	13,640	17,756	4,019	392	232	205	9,058 (Note: Former Mayor of Toronto John Sewell received 8,822 votes.)	344	45,646
Trinity—Spadina	NDP	17,110	47.89%	7,293	20.41%	Lib	PC	52.05%	7,323	9,817	17,110	612	–	274	412	182	35,730
Vaughan—King—Aurora	PC	28,836	54.70%	7,663	14.54%	Lib	NDP	59.78%	28,836	21,173	1,539	495	–	–	–	670	52,713
Haliburton—Victoria—Brock	PC	32,125	62.82%	17,569	34.35%	Lib	NDP	63.80%	32,125	14,556	3,786	–	–	135	340	198	51,140
Waterloo—Wellington	PC	26,286	61.46%	13,363	31.25%	Lib	NDP	56.23%	26,286	12,923	2,306	566	685	–	–	–	42,766
Ancaster—Dundas—Flamborough—Aldershot	PC	27,466	58.07%	11,623	24.57%	Lib	NDP	65.46%	27,466	15,843	3,990	–	–	–	–	–	47,299
Whitby—Ajax	PC	27,623	57.85%	11,388	23.85%	Lib	NDP	59.19%	27,623	16,235	3,889	–	–	–	–	–	47,747
Willowdale	PC	22,200	50.52%	3,621	8.24%	Lib	NDP	60.85%	22,200	18,579	1,871	330	409	75	323	152	43,939
Windsor—St. Clair	Lib	17,383	45.09%	4,212	10.92%	NDP	PC	52.46%	7,241	17,383	13,171	339	–	159	263	–	38,556
Windsor West	Lib	24,388	65.50%	18,159	48.77%	PC	NDP	49.27%	6,229	24,388	5,762	420	–	162	270	–	37,231
York Centre	Lib	21,250	61.09%	12,058	34.67%	PC	NDP	56.43%	9,192	21,250	3,721	–	–	621	–	–	34,784
York North	PC	29,613	61.81%	13,858	28.93%	Lib	NDP	58.63%	29,613	15,755	2,236	–	–	305	–	–	47,909
York South—Weston	Lib	18,205	53.39%	10,734	31.48%	PC	NDP	58.23%	7,471	18,205	6,850	147	542	139	486	261	34,101
York West	Lib	16,457	63.32%	11,371	43.75%	PC	NDP	53.19%	5,086	16,457	3,377	427	–	299	343	–	25,989

= Open seat
= turnout is above provincial average
= incumbent in previous Legislature
= Not incumbent; was previously elected to the Legislature
= Multiple candidates

=== Summary analysis ===
Party candidates in 2nd place
Party in 1st place	Party in 2nd place			Total
Party in 1st place	PC	Liberal	NDP	Total
Progressive Conservative		58	1	59
Liberal	31		4	35
New Democratic	6	3		9
Total	37	61	5	103

Principal races, according to 1st and 2nd-place results
Parties		Seats
█ Progressive Conservative	█ Liberal	89
█ Liberal	█ New Democratic	7
█ New Democratic	█ Progressive Conservative	7
Total		103

Candidates ranked 1st to 5th place, by party
Parties	1st	2nd	3rd	4th	5th
█ Progressive Conservative	59	37	7		
█ Liberal	35	61	7		
█ New Democratic	9	5	87	2	
█ Independent			2	11	16
█ Green				36	20
█ Family Coalition				24	9
█ Natural Law				16	19
█ Freedom				5	3
█ Libertarian				2	3
█ Communist					1
█ Confederation of Regions					1
█ Reform					1

== Constituency results ==
Expenditure entries are taken from official candidate reports as listed by Elections Ontario. The figures cited are the "Total Candidate's Campaign Expenses Subject to Limitation", and include transfers from constituency associations.

The official returns incorrectly list Ray as a candidate of the Ontario Communist Party, rather than the Communist League.

=== Ottawa-Carleton ===
Electoral district	Candidates						Incumbent
Electoral district	PC	Liberal	NDP	Natural Law	Green	Other	Incumbent
Carleton—Gloucester	Brian Coburn; 24,356	Rene Danis; 18,052	Jamie Gallant; 1,195	Richard Wolfson; 177	Andre Clermont; 614	Luc Brisebois (Ind); 247	Gilles Morin †; Carleton East
Nepean—Carleton	John Baird; 31,546	Gord Hunter; 16,809	Craig Parsons; 1,647		Brian E. Jackson; 239	Bill Frampton (F); 386	John Baird; Nepean
Ottawa Centre	Ray Kostuck; 15,403	Richard Patten; 17,956	Elisabeth Arnold; 11,977	Wayne Foster; 170	Chris Bradshaw; 1,231	Marvin Glass (Comm); 174; Mistahi Corkill (Ind [M-L]); 132	Richard Patten
Ottawa South	Mike Nicholson; 19,337	Dalton McGuinty; 22,707	James McLaren; 2,655	James Hea; 121	George Brown; 724	Mag Carson (Ind [M-L]); 243	Dalton McGuinty
Ottawa—Vanier	Maurice Lamirande; 12,605	Claudette Boyer; 21,009	David Gagnon; 4,163	Pierrette Blondin; 580	Richard Briggs; 953	Kevin Corkill (Ind [M-L]); 310	Bernard Grandmaître †; Ottawa East
Ottawa West—Nepean	Garry Guzzo; 22,834	Rick Chiarelli; 16,419	Alex Cullen; 7,701	Lester Newby; 70	Richard Warman; 453	Megan Hnatiw (Ind [M-L]); 129; John Turmel (Ind) 94; Anthony Silvestro (CoR); 79	Garry Guzzo; Ottawa—Rideau
Ottawa West—Nepean	Garry Guzzo; 22,834	Rick Chiarelli; 16,419	Alex Cullen; 7,701	Lester Newby; 70	Richard Warman; 453	Megan Hnatiw (Ind [M-L]); 129; John Turmel (Ind) 94; Anthony Silvestro (CoR); 79	Merged riding
Ottawa West—Nepean	Garry Guzzo; 22,834	Rick Chiarelli; 16,419	Alex Cullen; 7,701	Lester Newby; 70	Richard Warman; 453	Megan Hnatiw (Ind [M-L]); 129; John Turmel (Ind) 94; Anthony Silvestro (CoR); 79	Alex Cullen; Ottawa West

=== Eastern Ontario ===
Electoral district	Candidates						Incumbent
Electoral district	PC	Liberal	NDP	Natural Law	Green	Other	Incumbent
Glengarry— Prescott—Russell	Alain Lalonde; 17,364	Jean-Marc Lalonde; 24,568	Stephane Landry; 2,007	Mary Glasser; 425			Jean-Marc Lalonde; Prescott and Russell
Hastings— Frontenac—Lennox and Addington	Harry Danford; 18,553	Leona Dombrowsky; 20,395	Allan McPhail; 3,008				Harry Danford; Hastings—Peterborough
Hastings— Frontenac—Lennox and Addington	Harry Danford; 18,553	Leona Dombrowsky; 20,395	Allan McPhail; 3,008				Merged riding
Hastings— Frontenac—Lennox and Addington	Harry Danford; 18,553	Leona Dombrowsky; 20,395	Allan McPhail; 3,008				Bill Vankoughnet †; Frontenac—Addington
Kingston and the Islands	Bob Pickering; 14,487	John Gerretsen; 26,355	Beth Pater; 5,436	Gerard Morris; 182	Chris Walker; 1,174	Chris Beneteau (FCP); 546	John Gerretsen
Lanark—Carleton	Norm Sterling; 31,364	Dwight Eastman; 17,323	Sheila Sansome; 2,713	Angela Hea; 171	Stuart Langstaff; 681	J.J. Campbell (FCP); 1,450	Norm Sterling; Carleton
Leeds—Grenville	Bob Runciman; 23,390	Don Cameron; 17,307	Jim Murray; 2,097	Britt Roberts; 244	Ken Blackburn; 1,008		Rob Runciman
Prince Edward-Hastings	Gary Fox; 17,931	Ernie Parsons; 17,987	Bev Campbell; 2,877	Sylvie Poirier; 111	Shawn Talbot; 441	Marie Hineman (CoR); 203; Kevin River (Ind); 188; Trueman Tuck (Ind [Independent Reform]); 133	Gary Fox; Prince Edward—Lennox
Prince Edward-Hastings	Gary Fox; 17,931	Ernie Parsons; 17,987	Bev Campbell; 2,877	Sylvie Poirier; 111	Shawn Talbot; 441	Marie Hineman (CoR); 203; Kevin River (Ind); 188; Trueman Tuck (Ind [Independent Reform]); 133	Merged riding
Prince Edward-Hastings	Gary Fox; 17,931	Ernie Parsons; 17,987	Bev Campbell; 2,877	Sylvie Poirier; 111	Shawn Talbot; 441	Marie Hineman (CoR); 203; Kevin River (Ind); 188; Trueman Tuck (Ind [Independent Reform]); 133	Doug Rollins †; Quinte
Renfrew— Nipissing—Pembroke	Leo Jordan; 17,738	Sean Conway; 23,435	Gerry Boyer; 2,295	Andre Giordano; 172	Thane Heins; 287		Leo Jordan; Lanark—Renfrew
Renfrew— Nipissing—Pembroke	Leo Jordan; 17,738	Sean Conway; 23,435	Gerry Boyer; 2,295	Andre Giordano; 172	Thane Heins; 287		Merged riding
Renfrew— Nipissing—Pembroke	Leo Jordan; 17,738	Sean Conway; 23,435	Gerry Boyer; 2,295	Andre Giordano; 172	Thane Heins; 287		Sean Conway; Renfrew North
Stormont—Dundas— Charlottenburgh	Noble Villeneuve; 19,635	John Cleary; 20,275	Maggie MacDonald; 2,012	Ian Campbell; 329			Noble Villeneuve; Stormont—Dundas—Glengarry and East Grenville
Stormont—Dundas— Charlottenburgh	Noble Villeneuve; 19,635	John Cleary; 20,275	Maggie MacDonald; 2,012	Ian Campbell; 329			Merged riding
Stormont—Dundas— Charlottenburgh	Noble Villeneuve; 19,635	John Cleary; 20,275	Maggie MacDonald; 2,012	Ian Campbell; 329			John Cleary; Cornwall

=== Central Ontario ===
Electoral district	Candidates						Incumbent
Electoral district	PC	Liberal	NDP	Natural Law	Green	Other	Incumbent
Barrie—Simcoe—Bradford	Joe Tascona; 33,721	Maura Bolger; 15,376	Jim Brooker; 2,532	Mitchell Hibbs; 229		Walter Tracogna (Ind); 482; Rudy Couture (Ind); 302	Joe Tascona; Simcoe Centre
Bruce—Grey	Bill Murdoch; 24,915	Ruth Lovell; 16,139	Colleen Purdon; 2,776		Grant Pattullo; 373	John Clark (FCP); 1540	Bill Murdoch; Grey—Owen Sound
Dufferin—Peel—Wellington—Grey	David Tilson; 30,532	Steve White; 13,591	Noel Duignan; 1,871		Richard Procter; 1156		David Tilson; Dufferin—Peel
Durham	John O'Toole; 26,103	Garry Minnie; 14,694	Jim Morrison; 4,235	Jacinthe Millaire; 242	Gail Thompson; 467		John O'Toole; Durham East
Haliburton—Victoria—Brock	Chris Hodgson; 32,125	Sharon McCrae; 14,556	Rick Denyer; 3,786	Maxim Newby; 135		Brad Bradamore (Ind); 340; Charles Olito (F); 198	Chris Hodgson; Victoria—Haliburton
Northumberland	Doug Galt; 20,535	Carolyn Campbell; 19,632	Murray Weppler; 2,820	Pascale Levert; 99	Tom Lawson; 1,194	Jim Psihogios (FCP); 370	Doug Galt
Peterborough	Gary Stewart; 24,422	Jeff Leal; 21,820	Dave Nickle; 7,058	Larry Tyldsley; 598	Robert Mayer; 106	Bob Bowers (Ind); 151; K.T. Burgess (Ind); 125	Gary Stewart
Simcoe—Grey	Jim Wilson; 31,984	Norman Sandberg; 12,815	Mary Hart; 3,662				Jim Wilson; Simcoe West
Simcoe North	Garfield Dunlop; 26,160	George MacDonald; 19,209	Ann Billings; 2,913	William Ayling; 305	Harry Promm; 633		Al McLean†; Simcoe East
York North	Julia Munro; 29,613	John Volpe; 15,755	Steve Saysell; 2,236	Kwok-Lin Mary Wan; 305			Julia Munro; Durham—York
York North	Julia Munro; 29,613	John Volpe; 15,755	Steve Saysell; 2,236	Kwok-Lin Mary Wan; 305			Merged riding
York North	Julia Munro; 29,613	John Volpe; 15,755	Steve Saysell; 2,236	Kwok-Lin Mary Wan; 305			Frank Klees‡ York—Mackenzie

=== Southern Durham & York ===
Electoral district	Candidates					Incumbent
Electoral district	PC	Liberal	NDP	Green	Other	Incumbent
Markham	David Tsubouchi; 26,083	Steven Kirsch; 12,859	Janice Hagan; 1,594	Bernadette Manning; 437	Pat Redmond (FCP); 399	David Tsubouchi
Oak Ridges	Frank Klees; 30,432	Vito Spatafora; 17,427	Chris Moise; 1,957	Steven Haylestrom; 914		New District
Oshawa	Jerry Ouellette; 18,915	Chris Topple; 11,740	Colleen Twomey; 9,154		Garry Kotack (NLP); 651	Jerry Oullette
Pickering—Ajax—Uxbridge	Janet Ecker; 28,661	Dave Ryan; 16,881	Jim Wiseman; 2,814	Chris Pennington; 703	Bob Riaz (NLP); 191	Janet Ecker; Durham West
Thornhill	Tina Molinari; 19,580	Dan Ronen; 19,237	Nathan Rotman; 1,438	Ruth Van Bezold; 360		New District
Vaughan—King—Aurora	Al Palladini; 28,836	Tony Genco; 21,173	Michael Seaward; 1,539	Ernst Von Bezold; 495	John Genser (Lbt); 670	Al Palladini; York Centre
Whitby—Ajax	Jim Flaherty; 27,623	Aldo Digiovanni; 16,235	Betty Craig; 3,889			Jim Flaherty; Durham Centre

=== Central Toronto ===
Electoral district	Candidates							Incumbent
Electoral district	PC	Liberal	NDP	FCP	Natural Law	Green	Other	Incumbent
Beaches—East York	Judy Burns; 12,776	Bill Buckingham; 9,332	Frances Lankin; 19,703	Dan Largy; 264	Donalda Fredeen; 230	Michael Schulman; 431	Steve Rutchinski (Ind [M-L]); 164	Frances Lankin; Beaches—Woodbine
Beaches—East York	Judy Burns; 12,776	Bill Buckingham; 9,332	Frances Lankin; 19,703	Dan Largy; 264	Donalda Fredeen; 230	Michael Schulman; 431	Steve Rutchinski (Ind [M-L]); 164	Merged riding
Beaches—East York	Judy Burns; 12,776	Bill Buckingham; 9,332	Frances Lankin; 19,703	Dan Largy; 264	Donalda Fredeen; 230	Michael Schulman; 431	Steve Rutchinski (Ind [M-L]); 164	John Parker‡ York East
Broadview—Greenwood	Rita Smith; 9,554	Julie Wang Morris; 9,553	Marilyn Churley; 18,150	Tony Ieraci; 320	Bob Hyman; 565		Melanie Cishecki (Ind [M-L]); 543	Marilyn Churley; Riverdale
Davenport	Eduardo Marcos; 4,346	Tony Ruprecht; 13,649	Tony Silipo; 8,717		Maurice Seguin; 81	Paulo Simas; 22	Ken Kalopsis (R); 174; Barbara Seed (Ind [M-L]); 164; Nunzio Venuto (Lbt); 95	Tony Ruprecht; Parkdale
Davenport	Eduardo Marcos; 4,346	Tony Ruprecht; 13,649	Tony Silipo; 8,717		Maurice Seguin; 81	Paulo Simas; 22	Ken Kalopsis (R); 174; Barbara Seed (Ind [M-L]); 164; Nunzio Venuto (Lbt); 95	Merged riding
Davenport	Eduardo Marcos; 4,346	Tony Ruprecht; 13,649	Tony Silipo; 8,717		Maurice Seguin; 81	Paulo Simas; 22	Ken Kalopsis (R); 174; Barbara Seed (Ind [M-L]); 164; Nunzio Venuto (Lbt); 95	Tony Silipo; Dovercourt
Don Valley West	David Turnbull; 23,177	Paul Davidson; 20,008	Geoffrey Allen; 2,152		Debbie Weberg; 224		Judith Snow (Ind [M-L]); 312	David Turnbull; York Mills
Eglinton—Lawrence	John Parker; 14,994	Mike Colle; 24,151	Jay Waterman; 1,835	Frank D'Angelo; 821	Neil Dickie; 263	Shelly Lipsey; 470		Mike Colle; Oakwood
Parkdale—High Park	Annamarie Castrilli; 12,647	Gerard Kennedy; 23,022	Irene Atkinson; 4,937	Stan Grzywna; 289	Lynne Hea; 99	Frank de Jong; 500	Doug Burn (Lbt); 325; Jorge Van Schouwen (Ind [Humanist]); 99	Gerard Kennedy; York South
Parkdale—High Park	Annamarie Castrilli; 12,647	Gerard Kennedy; 23,022	Irene Atkinson; 4,937	Stan Grzywna; 289	Lynne Hea; 99	Frank de Jong; 500	Doug Burn (Lbt); 325; Jorge Van Schouwen (Ind [Humanist]); 99	Merged riding
Parkdale—High Park	Annamarie Castrilli; 12,647	Gerard Kennedy; 23,022	Irene Atkinson; 4,937	Stan Grzywna; 289	Lynne Hea; 99	Frank de Jong; 500	Doug Burn (Lbt); 325; Jorge Van Schouwen (Ind [Humanist]); 99	Derwyn Shea†; High Park—Swansea
St. Paul's	Isabel Bassett; 18,973	Michael Bryant; 23,755	Larry Solway; 3,350		Linda Martin; 188	Don Roebuck; 326	Philip Fernandez (Ind [M-L]); 194; Antonio Maristanes (Ind); 184	Isabel Bassett; St. Andrew—St. Patrick
St. Paul's	Isabel Bassett; 18,973	Michael Bryant; 23,755	Larry Solway; 3,350		Linda Martin; 188	Don Roebuck; 326	Philip Fernandez (Ind [M-L]); 194; Antonio Maristanes (Ind); 184	Merged riding
St. Paul's	Isabel Bassett; 18,973	Michael Bryant; 23,755	Larry Solway; 3,350		Linda Martin; 188	Don Roebuck; 326	Philip Fernandez (Ind [M-L]); 194; Antonio Maristanes (Ind); 184	Bill Saunderson†; Eglinton
Toronto Centre—Rosedale	Durhane Wong-Rieger; 13,640	George Smitherman; 17,756	Helen Breslauer; 4,019	Bill Whatcott; 232	Ron Parker; 205	Joseph Cohen; 392	John Sewell (Ind); 8822; Paul McKeever (F); 344; Mike Ryner (Ind); 236	Al Leach†; St. George—St. David
Trinity—Spadina	Chris Loreto; 7,323	Albert Koehl; 9,817	Rosario Marchese; 17,110		Ron Robins; 274	Sat Khalsa; 612	Roberto Verdecchia (Ind [Humanist]); 258; Silvio Ursomarzo (F); 182; Raymond Samuels (Ind); 154	Rosario Marchese; Fort York
York South—Weston	Alan Hofmeister; 7,471	Joe Cordiano; 18,205	Rosana Pellizzari; 6,850	Enzo Granzotto; 542	Erica Kindl; 139	Alma Subasic; 147	David Gershuny (Ind [M-L]); 486; Hassan Husseini (Comm); 261	Joe Cordiano; Lawrence

=== Suburban Toronto ===
Electoral district	Candidates							Incumbent
Electoral district	PC	Liberal	NDP	FCP	Natural Law	Green	Other	Incumbent
Don Valley East	David Johnson; 17,955	David Caplan; 20,993	J. Bala Krishnan; 1,822	Ryan Kidd; 153	Shail Lall; 28	Jeff Pancer; 85	Raffi Assadourian (Ind); 329; Elizabeth Rowley (Comm); 91; Fernand Deschamps (Ind [M-L]); 65; Wayne Simmons (F); 53	David Johnson; Don Mills
Don Valley East	David Johnson; 17,955	David Caplan; 20,993	J. Bala Krishnan; 1,822	Ryan Kidd; 153	Shail Lall; 28	Jeff Pancer; 85	Raffi Assadourian (Ind); 329; Elizabeth Rowley (Comm); 91; Fernand Deschamps (Ind [M-L]); 65; Wayne Simmons (F); 53	Merged riding
Don Valley East	David Johnson; 17,955	David Caplan; 20,993	J. Bala Krishnan; 1,822	Ryan Kidd; 153	Shail Lall; 28	Jeff Pancer; 85	Raffi Assadourian (Ind); 329; Elizabeth Rowley (Comm); 91; Fernand Deschamps (Ind [M-L]); 65; Wayne Simmons (F); 53	David Caplan; Oriole
Etobicoke Centre	Chris Stockwell; 25,518	Agnes Ugolini Potts; 19,035	Bonte Minnema; 1,309	Dan McCash; 389	Geraldine Jackson; 316	Christopher Morton; 375	Elaine Couto (Ind [M-L]); 209	Chris Stockwell; Etobicoke West
Etobicoke Centre	Chris Stockwell; 25,518	Agnes Ugolini Potts; 19,035	Bonte Minnema; 1,309	Dan McCash; 389	Geraldine Jackson; 316	Christopher Morton; 375	Elaine Couto (Ind [M-L]); 209	Merged riding
Etobicoke Centre	Chris Stockwell; 25,518	Agnes Ugolini Potts; 19,035	Bonte Minnema; 1,309	Dan McCash; 389	Geraldine Jackson; 316	Christopher Morton; 375	Elaine Couto (Ind [M-L]); 209	Doug Ford†; Etobicoke—Humber
Etobicoke—Lakeshore	Morley Kells; 20,602	Laurel Broten; 15,723	Vicki Obedkoff; 6,457	Kevin McGourty; 423	Don Jackson; 349		Janice Murray (Ind [M-L]); 299	Morley Kells
Etobicoke North	John Hastings; 13,065	Shafiq Qaadri; 11,619	Ed Philip; 8,166	Mark Stefanini; 580	Marilyn Pepper; 223		Diane Johnston (Ind [M-L]); 489	John Hastings; Etobicoke—Rexdale
Scarborough—Agincourt	Jim Brown; 15,915	Gerry Phillips; 18,698	Bob Frankford; 1,319		Ken Morgan; 129	Gary Carmichael; 451	Wayne Cook (Ind); 371	Gerry Philips
Scarborough Centre	Marilyn Mushinski; 18,189	Costas Manios; 14,565	Sid Ryan; 8,399	Rina Morra; 573	Eileen Murray; 455			Marilyn Mushinski; Scarborough—Ellesmere
Scarborough East	Steve Gilchrist; 20,686	Peter Vanderyagt; 17,084	Terry Maley; 2,853	Catherine Fox; 457	Loucas Café; 135		Sam Apelbaum (Lbt); 368; Heath Thomas (Ind); 205	Steve Gilchrist
Scarborough—Rouge River	Mubashar Dar; 12,061	Alvin Curling; 20,052	Paulette Senior; 2,138	Betty Peters; 489	Lou Dube; 284			Alvin Curling; Scarborough North
Scarborough Southwest	Dan Newman; 15,349	Adrian Heaps; 12,992	Michael Yorke; 8,962	Wiktor Borkowski; 495	Laurence Corp; 339	Barbara Schaefer; 466		Jim Brown‡ Scarborough West
Scarborough Southwest	Dan Newman; 15,349	Adrian Heaps; 12,992	Michael Yorke; 8,962	Wiktor Borkowski; 495	Laurence Corp; 339	Barbara Schaefer; 466		Merged riding
Scarborough Southwest	Dan Newman; 15,349	Adrian Heaps; 12,992	Michael Yorke; 8,962	Wiktor Borkowski; 495	Laurence Corp; 339	Barbara Schaefer; 466		Dan Newman; Scarborough Centre
Willowdale	David Young; 22,200	Fahimeh Mortazavi; 18,579	Mikael Swayze; 1,871	Jim Conrad; 409	Claude Viau; 75	Elizabeth Rhodes; 330	Bernadette Michael (Ind); 323; Vaughan Byrnes (F); 152	Charles Harnick†
York Centre	Robert Hausman; 9,192	Monte Kwinter; 21,250	Norm Jesin; 3721		Angus Hunt; 621			Annamarie Castrilli‡ Downsview
York Centre	Robert Hausman; 9,192	Monte Kwinter; 21,250	Norm Jesin; 3721		Angus Hunt; 621			Merged riding
York Centre	Robert Hausman; 9,192	Monte Kwinter; 21,250	Norm Jesin; 3721		Angus Hunt; 621			Monte Kwinter; Wilson Heights
York West	Chris Collier; 5,086	Mario Sergio; 16,457	Stephnie Payne; 3,377		Mark Scrafford; 299	Anthony Davison; 427	Nicholas Lin (Ind [M-L]); 194; Rosemary Ann Ray (Ind [Communist League]); 149	Mario Sergio; Yorkview

=== Brampton, Mississauga & Oakville ===
Electoral district	Candidates					Incumbent
Electoral district	PC	Liberal	NDP	Natural Law	Other	Incumbent
Bramalea—Gore—Malton—Springdale	Raminder Gill; 18,442	Dave Toor; 14,492	Vishnu Roche; 2,204		Roy Willis (Ind); 2,206	New District
Brampton Centre	Joe Spina; 20,623	Gurjit Grewal; 9,994	Paul Schmidt; 5,080			Joe Spina; Brampton North
Brampton West—Mississauga	Tony Clement; 24,909	Vic Dhillon; 16,599	John Devries; 2,824	Mei Sze Viau; 252		Tony Clement; Brampton South
Mississauga Centre	Rob Sampson; 18,688	George Winter; 14,572	Gail McCabe; 1,820	Bob Harringon; 1,117		Rob Sampson; Mississauga West
Mississauga East	Carl DeFaria; 17,688	Shan Padda; 13,371	James Kafieh; 2,484	Greg Mytron; 282	Pierre Chenier (Ind [M-L]); 469	Carl DeFaria
Mississauga South	Margaret Marland; 23,890	Ieva Martin; 12,275	Ken Cole; 2,293		Tim Sullivan (Ind [M-L]); 535	Margaret Marland
Mississauga West	John Snobelen; 26,816	Bob Delaney; 17,792	Maxine Caron; 1,795	Fred Fredeen; 387		John Snobelen; Mississauga North
Oakville	Gary Carr; 27,767	Kevin Flynn; 14,689	Sean Cain; 1,667	Linda Antonichuk; 202	Adrian Ratelle (FCP); 530	Gary Carr; Oakville South

=== Hamilton-Wentworth, Burlington & Niagara ===
Electoral district	Candidates							Incumbent
Electoral district	PC	Liberal	NDP	FCP	Natural Law	Green	Other	Incumbent
Burlington	Cam Jackson; 29,055	Linda Glover; 14,220	Danny Dunleavy; 2,167		Regina Law; 144	Bruce Smith; 432	Anne Marsden (Ind); 289	Cam Jackson; Burlington South
Erie—Lincoln	Tim Hudak; 20,481	Lorne Boyko; 14,603	Dave Thomas; 3,884	Alfred Kiers; 1009	John Gregory; 435			Tim Hudak; Niagara South
Halton	Ted Chudleigh; 35,505	Mohan Anand; 14,767	Jay Jackson; 2,833	Giuseppe Gori; 755		Bill Champ; 806		Ted Chudleigh; Halton North
Halton	Ted Chudleigh; 35,505	Mohan Anand; 14,767	Jay Jackson; 2,833	Giuseppe Gori; 755		Bill Champ; 806		Merged riding
Halton	Ted Chudleigh; 35,505	Mohan Anand; 14,767	Jay Jackson; 2,833	Giuseppe Gori; 755		Bill Champ; 806		Terence Young†; Halton Centre
Hamilton East	Peter Preston; 7,414	Dominic Agostino; 17,891	Bob Sutton; 6,304	Edgar Breau; 386	Laureen Amos; 258	Jim Howlett; 496	Bob Mann (Comm); 288; Julie Gordon (Ind [M-L]); 263	Dominic Agostino
Hamilton Mountain	Trevor Pettit; 16,397	Marie Bountrogianni; 19,076	Chris Charlton; 10,622	Jim Enos; 426	Bob Danio; 261	Kelli Gallagher; 456	Rolf Gerstenberger (Ind [M-L]); 159	Trevor Pettit
Hamilton West	Lillian Ross; 12,261	Frank D'Amico; 12,037	David Christopherson; 15,625	Lynne Scime; 403	Rita Rassenberg; 231	Phyllis McColl; 495	Wendell Fields (Ind-(ML)); 236	David Christopherson; Hamilton Centre
Hamilton West	Lillian Ross; 12,261	Frank D'Amico; 12,037	David Christopherson; 15,625	Lynne Scime; 403	Rita Rassenberg; 231	Phyllis McColl; 495	Wendell Fields (Ind-(ML)); 236	Merged riding
Hamilton West	Lillian Ross; 12,261	Frank D'Amico; 12,037	David Christopherson; 15,625	Lynne Scime; 403	Rita Rassenberg; 231	Phyllis McColl; 495	Wendell Fields (Ind-(ML)); 236	Lillian Ross
Niagara Centre	Frank Sheehan; 17,217	M. Charbonneau; 9,539	Peter Kormos; 21,856		Margaret Larrass; 382		Lank Makuloluwa (Ind); 198	Peter Kormos; Welland—Thorold
Niagara Centre	Frank Sheehan; 17,217	M. Charbonneau; 9,539	Peter Kormos; 21,856		Margaret Larrass; 382		Lank Makuloluwa (Ind); 198	Merged riding
Niagara Centre	Frank Sheehan; 17,217	M. Charbonneau; 9,539	Peter Kormos; 21,856		Margaret Larrass; 382		Lank Makuloluwa (Ind); 198	Frank Sheehan; Lincoln
Niagara Falls	Bart Maves; 18,497	Selina Volpatti; 17,080	Claude Sonier; 3,985		Bill Amos; 317	Clara Tarnoy; 300	Darren Wood (Ind); 298	Bart Maves
St. Catharines	Tom Froese; 17,994	Jim Bradley; 25,186	Gordon Coggins; 2,902		Helene Darisse; 272	Doug Woodard; 215	Ron Walker (Ind [M-L]); 154	Jim Bradley
St. Catharines	Tom Froese; 17,994	Jim Bradley; 25,186	Gordon Coggins; 2,902		Helene Darisse; 272	Doug Woodard; 215	Ron Walker (Ind [M-L]); 154	Merged riding
St. Catharines	Tom Froese; 17,994	Jim Bradley; 25,186	Gordon Coggins; 2,902		Helene Darisse; 272	Doug Woodard; 215	Ron Walker (Ind [M-L]); 154	Tom Froese; St. Catharines—Brock
Stoney Creek	Brad Clark; 21,462	Chris Phillips; 18,840	Robert Barlow; 4,922	Philip Lees; 1,206	Sue Marchand; 330		Paul Lane (Ind [M-L]); 350	Ed Doyle†; Wentworth East
Wentworth-Burlington	Toni Skarica; 27,466	Vicky Wylson-Sher; 15,843	Jessica Brennan; 3,990					Toni Skarica; Wentworth North

=== Midwestern Ontario ===
Electoral district	Candidates							Incumbent
Electoral district	PC	Liberal	NDP	FCP	Natural Law	Green	Other	Incumbent
Brant	Alayne Sokoloski; 20,210	Dave Levac; 21,166	David Sharpe; 2,889		Eleanor Hyodo; 294		Graham McRae (Ind); 495	Ron Johnson†; Brantford
Cambridge	Gerry Martiniuk; 24,583	Jerry Boyle; 10,244	Gary Gibson; 8,684	Al Smith; 824		Kathleen Morton; 489		Gerry Martiniuk
Guelph—Wellington	Brenda Elliott; 26,246	Wayne Hyland; 16,595	Bruce Abel; 5,907	John Gots; 1,020		Bradley Shaw; 733	Anna Di Carlo (Ind [M-L]); 396	Brenda Elliott; Guelph
Haldimand—Norfolk—Brant	Toby Barrett; 23,124	Doug Miller; 18,304	Prue Steiner; 2,600	Barra Gots; 584	Stefan Larrass; 148	John Jaques; 413		Peter Preston‡ Brant—Haldimand
Haldimand—Norfolk—Brant	Toby Barrett; 23,124	Doug Miller; 18,304	Prue Steiner; 2,600	Barra Gots; 584	Stefan Larrass; 148	John Jaques; 413		Merged riding
Haldimand—Norfolk—Brant	Toby Barrett; 23,124	Doug Miller; 18,304	Prue Steiner; 2,600	Barra Gots; 584	Stefan Larrass; 148	John Jaques; 413		Toby Barrett; Norfolk
Huron—Bruce	Helen Johns; 20,772	Ross Lamont; 18,993	Tony McQuail; 4,142	Linda Freiburger; 1494				Helen Johns; Huron
Huron—Bruce	Helen Johns; 20,772	Ross Lamont; 18,993	Tony McQuail; 4,142	Linda Freiburger; 1494				Merged riding
Huron—Bruce	Helen Johns; 20,772	Ross Lamont; 18,993	Tony McQuail; 4,142	Linda Freiburger; 1494				Barb Fisher†; Bruce
Kitchener Centre	Wayne Wettlaufer; 22,593	Berry Vrbanovic; 17,984	David Brohman; 3,494		Roy Anderson; 204	Susan Koswan; 561	Irvine Conner (Ind); 109; Julian Ichim (Ind [M-L]); 107	Wayne Wettlaufer; Kitchener
Kitchener Centre	Wayne Wettlaufer; 22,593	Berry Vrbanovic; 17,984	David Brohman; 3,494		Roy Anderson; 204	Susan Koswan; 561	Irvine Conner (Ind); 109; Julian Ichim (Ind [M-L]); 107	Merged riding
Kitchener Centre	Wayne Wettlaufer; 22,593	Berry Vrbanovic; 17,984	David Brohman; 3,494		Roy Anderson; 204	Susan Koswan; 561	Irvine Conner (Ind); 109; Julian Ichim (Ind [M-L]); 107	Gary Leadston†; Kitchener—Wilmot
Kitchener-Waterloo	Elizabeth Witmer; 27,830	Sean Strickland; 18,034	Ted Martin; 3,122	Lou Reitzel; 919	Richard Beecroft; 135	Judy Greenwood-Speers; 836	Matthew Albrecht (Ind [Humanist]); 202; Helmut Braun (Ind [M-L]); 122	Elizabeth Witmer; Waterloo North
Oxford	Ernie Hardeman; 22,726	Brian Brown; 15,160	Martin Donlevy; 3,077	Andre De Decker; 875	Jim Morris; 203		Kaye Sargent (Lbt); 321; Paul Blair (F); 312	Ernie Hardeman
Perth—Middlesex	Bert Johnson; 22,065	John Wilkinson; 15,428	Walter Vernon; 3,053	Pat Bannon; 1,369			Robert Smink (F); 521	Bert Johnson; Perth
Waterloo—Wellington	Ted Arnott; 26,286	Marion Reidel; 12,923	R. Walsh-Bowers; 2,306	Gord Truscott; 685		Brent Bouteiller; 566		Ted Arnott; Wellington

=== Southwestern Ontario ===
Electoral district	Candidates							Incumbent
Electoral district	PC	Liberal	NDP	Natural Law	Green	Freedom	Other	Incumbent
Chatham-Kent—Essex	Jack Carroll; 16,238	Pat Hoy; 24,239	Brian Sharp; 2,316		Greg Zolad; 462			Jack Carroll; Chatham—Kent
Chatham-Kent—Essex	Jack Carroll; 16,238	Pat Hoy; 24,239	Brian Sharp; 2,316		Greg Zolad; 462			Merged riding
Chatham-Kent—Essex	Jack Carroll; 16,238	Pat Hoy; 24,239	Brian Sharp; 2,316		Greg Zolad; 462			Pat Hoy; Essex—Kent
Elgin—Middlesex—London	Bruce Smith; 19,246	Steve Peters; 20,417	Dave LaPointe; 3,455		John Fisher; 391	Ray Monteith; 405	Corey Janzen (Ind); 284	Bruce Smith; Middlesex
Elgin—Middlesex—London	Bruce Smith; 19,246	Steve Peters; 20,417	Dave LaPointe; 3,455		John Fisher; 391	Ray Monteith; 405	Corey Janzen (Ind); 284	Merged riding
Elgin—Middlesex—London	Bruce Smith; 19,246	Steve Peters; 20,417	Dave LaPointe; 3,455		John Fisher; 391	Ray Monteith; 405	Corey Janzen (Ind); 284	Peter North†; Elgin
Essex	Pat O'Neil; 15,354	Bruce Crozier; 25,446	Merv Richards; 3,745				Enver Villamizar (Ind [M-L]) 307	Bruce Crozier; Essex South
Lambton—Kent—Middlesex	Marcel Beaubien; 19,561	Larry O'Neill; 18,665	Jim Lee; 4,170			Wayne Forbes; 1076		Marcel Beaubien; Lambton
London North Centre	Dianne Cunningham; 18,320	Roger Caranci; 9,518	Marion Boyd; 16,611	Stephen Porter; 120	Jeff Culbert; 366	Robert Metz; 156	Andrew Jezierski (FCP); 466	Dianne Cunningham; London North
London North Centre	Dianne Cunningham; 18,320	Roger Caranci; 9,518	Marion Boyd; 16,611	Stephen Porter; 120	Jeff Culbert; 366	Robert Metz; 156	Andrew Jezierski (FCP); 466	Merged riding
London North Centre	Dianne Cunningham; 18,320	Roger Caranci; 9,518	Marion Boyd; 16,611	Stephen Porter; 120	Jeff Culbert; 366	Robert Metz; 156	Andrew Jezierski (FCP); 466	Marion Boyd; London Centre
London—Fanshawe	Frank Mazzilli; 15,295	Peter Mancini; 13,912	Irene Mathyssen; 9,788	Heidi Strasser; 241	Wanda Beaver; 172	Lloyd Walker; 293		New District
London West	Bob Wood; 22,761	Darrel Skidmore; 22,467	Sandra McNee; 4,628	Ernie Merkley; 133	Jeremy Price; 308	Jack Plant; 236	Gayle Remisch (Lbt); 133	Bob Wood; London South
Sarnia—Lambton	Dave Boushy; 16,679	Caroline Di Cocco; 19,440	Mark Kotanen; 3,110			Andrew Falby; 517		Dave Boushy; Sarnia
Windsor—St. Clair	Mike Rohrer; 7,241	Dwight Duncan; 17,383	Wayne Lessard; 13,171	Janet Shorten; 159	Darren J. Brown; 339		Ralph Kirchner (Ind); 263	Dwight Duncan; Windsor—Walkerville
Windsor—St. Clair	Mike Rohrer; 7,241	Dwight Duncan; 17,383	Wayne Lessard; 13,171	Janet Shorten; 159	Darren J. Brown; 339		Ralph Kirchner (Ind); 263	Merged riding
Windsor—St. Clair	Mike Rohrer; 7,241	Dwight Duncan; 17,383	Wayne Lessard; 13,171	Janet Shorten; 159	Darren J. Brown; 339		Ralph Kirchner (Ind); 263	Wayne Lessard; Windsor—Riverside
Windsor West	David McCamon; 6,229	Sandra Pupatello; 24,388	Liam McCarthy; 5,762	Lynn Tobin; 162	Timothy Dugdale; 420		Robert Cruise (Ind [M-L]); 270	Sandra Pupatello; Windsor—Sandwich

=== Northern Ontario ===
Electoral district	Candidates				Incumbent
Electoral district	PC	Liberal	NDP	Other	Incumbent
Algoma—Manitoulin	Keith Currie; 8,617	Mike Brown; 14,299	Lynn Watson; 8,780	Graham Hearn (Lbt); 425	Mike Brown
Algoma—Manitoulin	Keith Currie; 8,617	Mike Brown; 14,299	Lynn Watson; 8,780	Graham Hearn (Lbt); 425	Merged riding
Algoma—Manitoulin	Keith Currie; 8,617	Mike Brown; 14,299	Lynn Watson; 8,780	Graham Hearn (Lbt); 425	Bud Wildman†; Algoma
Kenora—Rainy River	Lynn Beyak; 5,483	Frank Miclash; 11,209	Howard Hampton; 14,269	Richard Bruyere (Ind); 934	Frank Miclash; Kenora
Kenora—Rainy River	Lynn Beyak; 5,483	Frank Miclash; 11,209	Howard Hampton; 14,269	Richard Bruyere (Ind); 934	Merged riding
Kenora—Rainy River	Lynn Beyak; 5,483	Frank Miclash; 11,209	Howard Hampton; 14,269	Richard Bruyere (Ind); 934	Howard Hampton; Rainy River
Nickel Belt	Gerry Courtemanche; 10,359	Ron Dupuis; 10,165	Shelley Martel; 14,833		Blain Morin†
Nickel Belt	Gerry Courtemanche; 10,359	Ron Dupuis; 10,165	Shelley Martel; 14,833		Merged riding
Nickel Belt	Gerry Courtemanche; 10,359	Ron Dupuis; 10,165	Shelley Martel; 14,833		Shelley Martel; Sudbury East
Nipissing	Mike Harris; 19,498	George Maroosis; 16,682	Wendy Young; 1,878	Jaimie Board (G); 366; Michaele Morris (NLP); 246	Mike Harris
Parry Sound—Muskoka	Ernie Eves; 22,967	Isabel Doxey; 10,970	Dan Waters; 5,343	Iris Tamssot (NLP); 339	Ernie Eves; Parry Sound
Parry Sound—Muskoka	Ernie Eves; 22,967	Isabel Doxey; 10,970	Dan Waters; 5,343	Iris Tamssot (NLP); 339	Merged riding
Parry Sound—Muskoka	Ernie Eves; 22,967	Isabel Doxey; 10,970	Dan Waters; 5,343	Iris Tamssot (NLP); 339	Bill Grimmett†; Muskoka—Georgian Bay
Sault Ste. Marie	James Caicco; 10,477	Terry Sheehan; 10,180	Tony Martin; 15,949	Colleen Hibbs (NLP); 288	Tony Martin
Sudbury	Mila Wong; 10,948	Rick Bartolucci; 21,732	Paul Chislett; 3,891	Bernard Fram (NLP); 184; Ed Pokonzie (Ind); 159; David Popescu (Ind); 103	Rick Bartolucci
Thunder Bay—Atikokan	John Henderson; 6,081	Lyn McLeod; 20,268	Jack Drewes; 5,304		Lyn McLeod; Fort William
Thunder Bay—Superior North	Ed Linkewich; 5,683	Michael Gravelle; 19,249	Nathalie Galesloot; 5,864	Robert Woito (Ind); 431; Carl Rose (G); 382	Michael Gravelle; Port Arthur
Thunder Bay—Superior North	Ed Linkewich; 5,683	Michael Gravelle; 19,249	Nathalie Galesloot; 5,864	Robert Woito (Ind); 431; Carl Rose (G); 382	Merged riding
Thunder Bay—Superior North	Ed Linkewich; 5,683	Michael Gravelle; 19,249	Nathalie Galesloot; 5,864	Robert Woito (Ind); 431; Carl Rose (G); 382	Gilles Pouliot†; Lake Nipigon
Timiskaming—Cochrane	Rick Brassard; 10,374	David Ramsay; 16,877	Len Wood; 7,631		David Ramsay; Timiskaming
Timiskaming—Cochrane	Rick Brassard; 10,374	David Ramsay; 16,877	Len Wood; 7,631		Merged riding
Timiskaming—Cochrane	Rick Brassard; 10,374	David Ramsay; 16,877	Len Wood; 7,631		Len Wood; Cochrane North
Timmins—James Bay	Marcel Pelchat; 4,139	Yves Malette; 10,238	Gilles Bisson; 16,504	Ed Walsh (Ind); 316	Gilles Bisson; Cochrane South

== By-elections ==
Six by-elections were held between the 1999 and 2003 elections.

Electoral district	Candidates					Incumbent
Electoral district	Liberal	PC	NDP	Green	Other	Incumbent
Ancaster—Dundas—Flamborough—Aldershot; September 7, 2000	Ted McMeekin; 19,916	Priscilla de Villiers; 10,201	Jessica Brennan; 2,297	Mark Coakley; 903	John Turmel (Ind); 80	Toni Skarica
Parry Sound—Muskoka; February 8, 2001	Evelyn Brown; 8,979	Norm Miller; 12,903	Joanne Bury; 888	Richard Thomas; 3,229	Anne Marsden (Ind); 113; John Turmel (Ind); 61	Ernie Eves
Vaughan—King—Aurora; June 28, 2001	Greg Sorbara; 21,961	Joyce Frustaglio; 12,172	Mike Seward; 708	Ernst Von Bezold; 752	Rina Morra (FCP); 267	Al Palladini
Beaches—East York; September 20, 2001	Robert Hunter; 10,289	Mac Penney; 2,821	Michael Prue; 14,024	Peter Elgie; 694	Ray Scott (FCP); 206; Vince Corriere (Ind); 59; Dan King (Ind); 51	Frances Lankin
Nipissing; May 2, 2002	George Maroosis; 13,970	Al McDonald; 13,989	Wendy Young; 1,821	Todd Lucier; 940		Mike Harris
Dufferin—Peel—Wellington—Grey; May 2, 2002	Josh Matlow; 11,728	Ernie Eves; 15,288	Doug Wilcox; 2,633	Richard Procter; 2,017	Dave Davies (FCP); 1,025; John Turmel (Ind); 120	David Tilson

== See also ==
- Politics of Ontario
- Independent candidates, 1999 Ontario provincial election
- Independent Marxist–Leninist candidates, 1999 Ontario provincial election
- List of Ontario political parties
- Premier of Ontario
- Leader of the Opposition (Ontario)
