= Oak Ridges (provincial electoral district) =

Former provincial electoral district in Ontario, Canada

Ontario electoral district
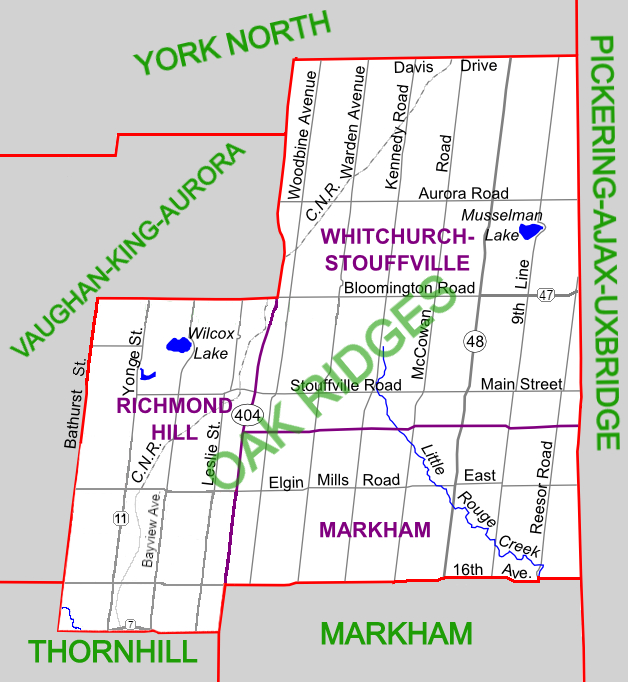
- Map of the riding

Demographics
- Population (2001): 173,378
- Electors (2002): 99,152
- Area (km²): 432

Oak Ridges was a provincial electoral district in Ontario, Canada, that was represented in the Legislative Assembly of Ontario from 1999 to 2007.

It consisted of the towns of Richmond Hill and Whitchurch-Stouffville, and the part of the town of Markham (now a city) north of 16th Avenue.

Ahead of the 1999 Ontario provincial election, all provincial electoral districts (or "ridings" colloquially in English Canada), were recreated to match the boundaries of Ontario federal electoral districts as defined in the 1996 Representation Order. This led to a reduction of 27 seats at the Legislative Assembly of Ontario, leading to many head-to-head survival contests between incumbent MPPs, some even between MPPs of the same party. York Region however was one of the two exception that gain additional seats, due to the explosive population growth in the 1980s. When the new provincial electoral map is compared to the previous one, Oak Ridges is one of only three newly carved out district.

While the Oak Ridges federal electoral district was created from parts of the federal electoral districts of Markham—Whitchurch—Stouffville (created as Markham by the 1987 Representation Order) and York North (one of the original ridings created by the British North America Act, 1867), the news provincial electoral district consisted portions from three former provincial electoral districts:

- 42% of York Centre
- 19% of Durham York
- 4% of Markham

The electoral district was only contested twice, electing Progressive Conservative Frank Klees both time. It was abolished in 2003 and redistributed to Oak Ridges—Markham and Richmond Hill.

== Members of Provincial Parliament ==
Oak Ridges
Assembly	Years	Member	Party
Created from parts of York Centre, Durham York, Markham
37th	1999–2003	Frank Klees	Progressive Conservative
38th	2003–2007	Frank Klees	Progressive Conservative
Redistributed to Oak Ridges—Markham and Richmond Hill

== Election results ==
2003 Ontario general election
Party	Candidate	Votes	%	±%
Progressive Conservative	Frank Klees	32,647	47.27	–12.71
Liberal	Helena Jaczek	30,126	43.62	+9.27
New Democratic	Pamela Courtot	4,464	6.46	+2.61
Green	Steven Haylestrom	1,821	2.64	+0.84
Total valid votes		69,058	99.41	
Total rejected, unmarked and declined ballots		407	0.59	–0.11
Turnout		69,465	54.15	–2.41
Eligible voters		128,280		
Progressive Conservative hold		Swing		–10.99
Source: Elections Ontario

1999 Ontario general election
Party	Candidate	Votes	%
Progressive Conservative	Frank Klees	30,432	59.99
Liberal	Vito Spatafora	17,427	34.35
New Democratic	Chris Moise	1,957	3.86
Green	Steven Haylestrom	914	1.80
Total valid votes		50,730	99.31
Total rejected, unmarked and declined ballots		354	0.69
Turnout		51,084	56.56
Eligible voters		90,319	
Progressive Conservative pickup new district.			
Source: Elections Ontario

== See also ==
- List of Canadian electoral districts
