= Leonard Braithwaite =

Canadian politician (1923–2012)

Ontario MPP
- In office 1963–1975
- Preceded by: Riding established
- Succeeded by: Ed Philip
- Constituency: Etobicoke

Personal details
- Born: Leonard Austin Braithwaite; October 23, 1923 Toronto, Ontario, Canada
- Died: March 28, 2012 (aged 88) Toronto, Ontario, Canada
- Party: Ontario Liberal
- Spouse: Anne Braithwaite
- Children: Roger; David
- Occupation: Lawyer

Military service
- Allegiance: Canada
- Branch/service: Royal Canadian Air Force
- Years of service: 1943-46
- Rank: DAC
- Unit: 6th Bomber Group

Leonard Austin Braithwaite CM OOnt QC (October 23, 1923 – March 28, 2012) was a Canadian lawyer and former politician in Ontario, Canada. He served in the Legislative Assembly of Ontario as a member of the Liberal Party from 1963 to 1975. He was the first Black Canadian to be elected to the Ontario Legislature.

== Background ==
Braithwaite was born in Toronto, Ontario, to a Barbadian father and a Jamaican mother. Leonard served overseas with the Royal Canadian Air Force in World War II. He received a Bachelor of Commerce degree from the University of Toronto in 1950. He then received a Master of Business Administration degree from the Harvard Business School in 1952, and graduated from Osgoode Hall Law School in 1958. He practiced as a barrister and solicitor, and was named a Queen's Counsel in 1971.

== Political career ==
His political career began in 1960, when he was elected to Ward Four of the Etobicoke township board of education. Braithwaite was president of Etobicoke ratepayer's association at the time, and was elected because of demand for a high school north of Eglinton. Two years later, he was elected as an alderman on the Etobicoke council.

Braithwaite ran for the Liberals in the 1963 provincial election, and defeated Progressive Conservative candidate Geoffrey Grossmith to win the newly created constituency of Etobicoke by 446 votes. The original declared result showed Grossmith winning by over 500 votes, and Braithwaite was only declared elected after a serious error in the vote totals was discovered by his campaign team. The Returning Officer claimed it was an accident, due to pre-count tests of the mechanical adding machines that were not cleared before the official count began.

Braithwaite helped to revoke a section of the Ontario Separate Schools act that had allowed for racial segregation in public schools, when he asked the Legislature to "get rid of the old race law" during his maiden speech at Queen's Park on February 4, 1964. He also called for the admission of female legislative pages in 1966. He was re-elected in 1967 and 1971, and served as the Liberal Party Critic for Labour and Welfare.

He was defeated in the 1975 election, losing to New Democratic Party candidate Ed Philip by 1,256 votes in the redistributed electoral district. He was elected a city controller on the Etobicoke City Council in 1982. He attempted a return to the provincial legislature during the 1985 election; he was a last minute candidate, as the York West Liberal constituency association could not find anyone to run against the Progressive Conservative incumbent Nick Leluk, who was also the Minister of Correctional Services at the time. Braithwaite lost by 715 votes, significantly closer than his constituency association originally expected, as they thought Leluk would win by a massive rout. Braithwaite did not run again, and neither did Leluk in the next election, two-years later.

== Post-political career and awards ==
Braithwaite became a bencher of the Governing Council of The Law Society of Upper Canada in 1999. He was appointed a Member of the Order of Canada in 1997, and invested into the order on February 4, 1998. He was appointed to the Order of Ontario in 2004. Braithwaite died in Toronto on March 28, 2012, at the age of 88. In 2012, the City of Toronto a park in the Etobicoke electoral district he represented to Len Braithwaite Park in his honour.
