= Etobicoke (provincial electoral district) =

Former provincial electoral district in Ontario, Canada

Ontario electoral district

Defunct provincial electoral district
- Legislature: Legislative Assembly of Ontario
- District created: 1963
- District abolished: 1987
- First contested: 1963
- Last contested: 1987

Demographics
- Census division: Toronto
- Census subdivision: Toronto

Etobicoke was a provincial electoral district in Ontario, Canada. It was created prior to the 1963 provincial election and eliminated in 1987, when its territory was incorporated into the riding of Etobicoke—Rexdale. Etobicoke riding was created from the northern part of York West. It was in the former borough of Etobicoke.

Two Members of Provincial Parliament represented the riding during its history. The most notable was Ed Philip who served in Bob Rae's cabinet in a number of roles from 1990 to 1995.

== Members of Provincial Parliament ==
Etobicoke
Assembly	Years	Member	Party
Created from York West riding in 1963
27th	1963–1967	Leonard Braithwaite	Liberal
28th	1967–1971	Leonard Braithwaite	Liberal
29th	1971–1975	Leonard Braithwaite	Liberal
30th	1975–1977	Ed Philip	New Democratic
31st	1977–1981	Ed Philip	New Democratic
32nd	1981–1985	Ed Philip	New Democratic
33rd	1985–1987	Ed Philip	New Democratic
Sourced from the Ontario Legislative Assembly
Merged into Etobicoke—Rexdale riding after 1987

== Electoral results ==
1985 Ontario general election
Party	Candidate	Votes	%	±%
New Democratic	Ed Philip	16,792	54.33	+13.69
Progressive Conservative	John D. Smith	7,573	24.50	–6.93
Liberal	John W. Genser	6,544	21.17	–6.77
Total valid votes		30,909	99.39	
Total rejected ballots		189	0.61	–0.10
Turnout		31,098	58.64	+3.43
Eligible voters		53,033		
New Democratic hold		Swing		+10.31
Source: Elections Ontario

1981 Ontario general election
Party	Candidate	Votes	%	±%
New Democratic	Ed Philip	10,373	40.63	–5.35
Progressive Conservative	Aileen Anderson	8,024	31.43	+4.60
Liberal	Laureano Leone	7,132	27.94	+2.79
Total valid votes		25,529	99.29	
Total rejected ballots		183	0.71	+0.18
Turnout		25,712	55.21	–9.03
Eligible voters		46,572		
New Democratic hold		Swing		–4.98
Source: Elections Ontario

1977 Ontario general election
Party	Candidate	Votes	%	±%
New Democratic	Ed Philip	11,637	45.99	+8.37
Progressive Conservative	Rosalyn McKenna	6,789	26.83	–3.18
Liberal	Ben Bellantone	6,363	25.14	–7.23
Libertarian	Richard Bolstler	517	2.04	–
Total valid votes		25,306	99.47	
Total rejected ballots		135	0.53	+0.08
Turnout		25,441	64.24	–2.68
Eligible voters		39,606		
New Democratic hold		Swing		+5.77
Source: Elections Ontario

1975 Ontario general election
Party	Candidate	Votes	%	±%
New Democratic	Ed Philip	9,016	37.62	+15.97
Liberal	Leonard Braithwaite	7,760	32.38	–7.41
Progressive Conservative	Bill Stockwell	7,191	30.00	–7.53
Total valid votes		23,967	99.55	
Total rejected ballots		108	0.45	+0.04
Turnout		24,075	66.92	–8.64
Eligible voters		35,977		
New Democratic gain from Liberal		Swing		+11.75
Source: Elections Ontario

1971 Ontario general election
Party	Candidate	Votes	%	±%
Liberal	Leonard Braithwaite	16,676	39.79	–3.00
Progressive Conservative	Dennis Flynn	15,733	37.54	+10.13
New Democratic	Clayton Peterson	9,072	21.64	–8.16
Independent	Harold N. Lehman	432	1.03	–
Total valid votes		41,913	99.59	
Total rejected ballots		171	0.41	–0.23
Turnout		42,084	75.56	+5.92
Eligible voters		55,697		
Liberal hold		Swing		–6.57
Source: Elections Ontario

1967 Ontario general election
Party	Candidate	Votes	%	±%
Liberal	Leonard Braithwaite	13,120	42.79	+0.06
New Democratic	Mort Warling	9,138	29.80	+12.95
Progressive Conservative	John Allen	8,402	27.40	–13.00
Total valid votes		30,660	99.37	
Total rejected ballots		195	0.63	–0.03
Turnout		30,855	69.64	+7.04
Eligible voters		44,304		
Liberal hold		Swing		–6.44
Source: Elections Ontario

1963 Ontario general election
Party	Candidate	Votes	%
Liberal	Leonard Braithwaite	8,193	42.73
Progressive Conservative	Geoffrey J. Grossmith	7,747	40.41
New Democratic	James V. Goodison	3,232	16.86
Total valid votes		19,172	99.34
Total rejected ballots		128	0.66
Turnout		19,300	62.61
Eligible voters		30,828	
Liberal pickup new district.			
Source: Elections Ontario

== See also ==
- List of Ontario provincial electoral districts
- Canadian provincial electoral districts
