= Etobicoke North (provincial electoral district) =

Provincial electoral district in Ontario, Canada

Coordinates: 43.7392°N 79.5815°W

Ontario electoral district
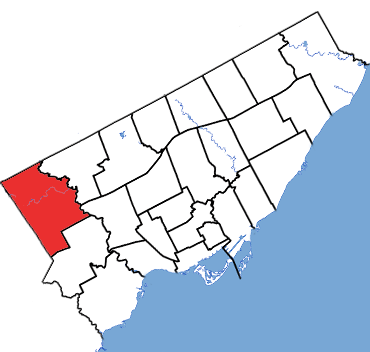
- Etobicoke North in relation to other Toronto electoral districts

Provincial electoral district
- Legislature: Legislative Assembly of Ontario
MPP
Doug Ford
Progressive Conservative
- District created: 1996
- First contested: 1999
- Last contested: 2025

Demographics
- Population (2021): 116,003
- Electors (2025): 76,000
- Area (km²): 49
- Pop. density (per km²): 2,367.4
- Census division: Toronto
- Census subdivision: Toronto

Etobicoke North is a provincial electoral district in Toronto, Ontario, Canada. It elects one member to the Legislative Assembly of Ontario. It is currently represented by Doug Ford, the Premier of Ontario.

It was created in 1999 from parts of Etobicoke—Rexdale and Etobicoke—Humber. At the time, it included all of Etobicoke north of a line following the 401 to Dixon Road to Royal York Road to La Rose Avenue. In 2007, the southern border was altered to follow Dixon Road all the way to Humber River.

== Members of Provincial Parliament ==
Etobicoke North
Assembly	Years	Member	Party
Riding created from Etobicoke—Rexdale and Etobicoke—Humber
37th	1999–2003	John Hastings	Progressive Conservative
38th	2003–2007	Shafiq Qaadri	Liberal
39th	2007–2011	Shafiq Qaadri	Liberal
40th	2011–2014	Shafiq Qaadri	Liberal
41st	2014–2018	Shafiq Qaadri	Liberal
42nd	2018–2022	Doug Ford	Progressive Conservative
43rd	2022–2025	Doug Ford	Progressive Conservative
44th	2025–present	Doug Ford	Progressive Conservative
Sourced from the Ontario Legislative Assembly

== Election results ==
Winning party in each polling division of Etobicoke North at the 2025 Ontario general election

2025 Ontario general election
Party	Candidate	Votes	%	±%
Progressive Conservative	Doug Ford	15,426	59.40	+3.89
Liberal	Julie Lutete	7,369	28.38	+4.94
New Democratic	Bryan Blair	2,067	7.96	–5.15
Green	Chelsey Edwards	526	2.03	–0.72
Ontario Party	Andy D'Andrea	405	1.56	–1.56
New Blue	John Gardner	177	0.68	–0.88
Total valid votes		25,970	99.19	
Total rejected, unmarked and declined ballots		212	0.81	+0.03
Turnout		26,182	34.12	+0.14
Eligible voters		76,734		
Progressive Conservative hold		Swing		–0.52
Source: Elections Ontario

Winning party in each polling division of Etobicoke North at the 2022 Ontario general election

2022 Ontario general election
Party	Candidate	Votes	%	±%	Expenditures
Progressive Conservative	Doug Ford	13,934	55.51	+3.02	$80,899
Liberal	Julie Lutete	5,884	23.44	+5.26	$61,441
New Democratic	Aisha Jahangir	3,290	13.11	–12.26	$20,065
Ontario Party	Andy D'Andrea	782	3.12	–	$6,413
Green	Gabriel Blanc	690	2.75	–0.08	$301
New Blue	Victor Ehikwe	391	1.56	–	$10,802
People's Political Party	Carol Royer	132	0.53	–	$950
Total valid votes		25,103	99.22	–	$105,547
Total rejected, unmarked and declined ballots		198	0.78	–0.33	
Turnout		25,301	33.98	–16.60	
Eligible voters		74,449			
Progressive Conservative hold		Swing		▼1.12	
Source: Elections Ontario

2018 Ontario general election
Party	Candidate	Votes	%	±%
Progressive Conservative	Doug Ford	19,055	52.48	+29.94
New Democratic	Mahamud Amin	9,210	25.37	–0.30
Liberal	Shafiq Qaadri	6,601	18.18	–27.47
Green	Nancy Kaur Ghuman	1,026	2.83	+0.40
Libertarian	Brianne Lefebvre	414	1.14	–
Total valid votes		36,306	98.89	
Total rejected, unmarked and declined ballots		407	1.11	
Turnout		36,713	50.58	
Eligible voters		72,580		
Progressive Conservative notional gain from Liberal		Swing		+15.12
Source: Elections Ontario

2014 general election redistributed results
Party	Vote	%
Liberal	13,322	45.65
New Democratic	7,493	25.67
Progressive Conservative	6,579	22.54
Others	1,083	3.71
Green	708	2.43

2014 Ontario general election
Party	Candidate	Votes	%	±%
Liberal	Shafiq Qaadri	12,168	44.90	–3.55
New Democratic	Nigel Barriffe	7,103	26.21	+4.45
Progressive Conservative	Tony Milone	6,163	22.74	–1.61
Libertarian	Allan deRoo	706	2.61	–
Green	Kenny Robertson	677	2.50	+0.33
Freedom	James McConnell	281	1.04	–0.25
Total valid votes		27,098	98.69	
Total rejected, unmarked and declined ballots		360	1.31	+0.71
Turnout		27,458	42.71	+2.56
Eligible voters		64,284		
Liberal hold		Swing		–4.00
Source: Elections Ontario

2011 Ontario general election
Party	Candidate	Votes	%	±%
Liberal	Shafiq Qaadri	12,081	48.46	–6.39
Progressive Conservative	Karm Singh	6,072	24.36	+3.35
New Democratic	Vrind Sharma	5,426	21.76	+6.91
Green	Gurleen Gill	541	2.17	–2.58
Family Coalition	Claudio Ceolin	391	1.57	–2.98
Freedom	James McConnell	320	1.28	–
Paramount Canadians	Gopal Baghel	100	0.40	–
Total valid votes		24,931	99.40	
Total rejected, unmarked and declined ballots		151	0.60	–1.13
Turnout		25,082	40.15	–5.04
Eligible voters		62,472		
Liberal hold		Swing		–4.87
Source: Elections Ontario

2007 Ontario general election
Party	Candidate	Votes	%	±%
Liberal	Shafiq Qaadri	15,147	54.85	+0.87
Progressive Conservative	Mohamed Kassim	5,801	21.01	–1.51
New Democratic	Mohamed Boudjenane	4,101	14.85	+3.50
Green	Jama Korshel	1,312	4.75	+3.13
Family Coalition	Teresa Ceolin	1,255	4.54	+0.43
Total valid votes		27,616	98.26	
Total rejected, unmarked and declined ballots		488	1.74	+0.45
Turnout		28,104	45.19	–2.72
Eligible voters		62,196		
Liberal hold		Swing		+1.19
Source: Elections Ontario

2003 Ontario general election
Party	Candidate	Votes	%	±%
Liberal	Shafiq Qaadri	16,727	53.98	+19.95
Progressive Conservative	Bal Gosal	6,978	22.52	–15.75
New Democratic	Kuldip Singh Sodhi	3,516	11.35	–12.57
Independent	Frank Acri	1,990	6.42	–
Family Coalition	Teresa Ceolin	1,275	4.11	+2.42
Green	Mir Kamal	503	1.62	–
Total valid votes		30,989	98.71	
Total rejected, unmarked and declined ballots		405	1.29	–0.18
Turnout		31,394	47.91	–7.01
Eligible voters		65,527		
Liberal gain from Progressive Conservative		Swing		+17.85
Source: Elections Ontario

1999 Ontario general election
Party	Candidate	Votes	%
Progressive Conservative	John Hastings	13,065	38.27
Liberal	Shafiq Qaadri	11,619	34.03
New Democratic	Ed Philip	8,166	23.92
Family Coalition	Mark Stefanini	580	1.70
Independent	Diane Johnston	489	1.43
Natural Law	Marilyn Pepper	223	0.65
Total valid votes		34,142	98.53
Total rejected, unmarked and declined ballots		509	1.47
Turnout		34,651	54.92
Eligible voters		63,095	
Progressive Conservative pickup new district.			
Source: Elections Ontario

== 2007 electoral reform referendum ==
2007 Ontario electoral reform referendum
Side	Votes	%
First Past the Post	14,825	57.7
Mixed member proportional	10,875	42.3
Total valid votes	25,700	100.0

== See also ==
- List of Ontario provincial electoral districts
- Canadian provincial electoral districts
