= Ed Philip =

Canadian politician (1940–2022)

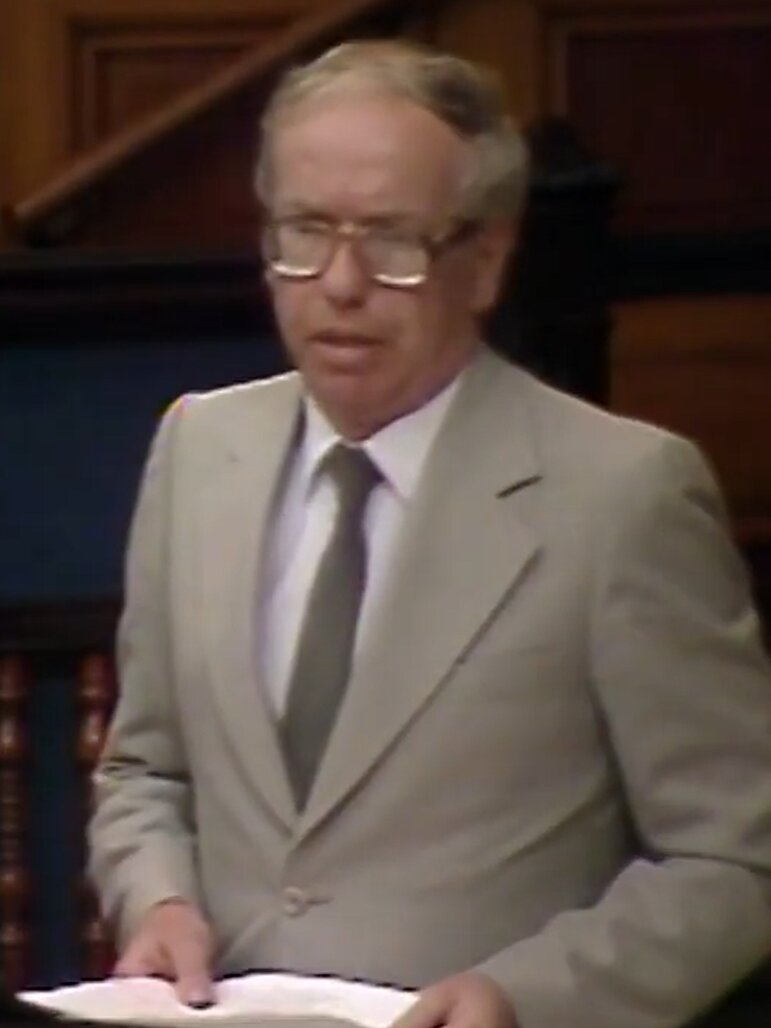
- Philip in 1986

Ontario MPP
- In office 1987–1995
- Preceded by: Riding established
- Succeeded by: John Hastings
- Constituency: Etobicoke—Rexdale
- In office 1975–1987
- Preceded by: Leonard Braithwaite
- Succeeded by: Riding abolished
- Constituency: Etobicoke

Personal details
- Born: Edward Thomas Philip; March 11, 1940 Montreal, Quebec, Canada
- Died: January 31, 2022 (aged 81) Richmond Hill, Ontario, Canada
- Party: Ontario New Democrat
- Spouse(s): Audrey Philip, Suzanne
- Children: 2
- Occupation: Educator, management consultant

Edward Thomas Philip (March 11, 1940 - January 31, 2022) was a Canadian politician in Ontario, Canada. He was a New Democratic Party (NDP) member of the Legislative Assembly of Ontario from 1975 to 1995 who represented the west Toronto riding of Etobicoke. From 1990 to 1995, he was a cabinet minister in the government of Bob Rae.

== Background ==
Philip was educated at St. Joseph's Teachers' College, the University of Ottawa, and the Ontario Institute for Studies in Education, earning a Master of Education. He worked as an adult educator and management consultant before entering politics, and was a coordinator of leadership training with the Ontario Federation of Agriculture.

Philip was married to Audrey with whom he has two children. Previously, he was married to Suzanne. Philip died at Mackenzie Health Hospital in Richmond Hill, Ontario on January 31, 2022.

== Politics ==
Philip was elected to the Ontario legislature in the provincial election of 1975, defeating incumbent Liberal Leonard Braithwaite by 1,256 votes in the Toronto riding of Etobicoke. He was re-elected by a greater margin in the election of 1977, and fended off a stronger challenge from Progressive Conservative Aileen Anderson in the 1981 election. In the elections of 1985, 1987 and 1990, he was elected without difficulty.

Philip supported Bob Rae for the provincial NDP leadership in 1982. During his time in opposition, he held various critic portfolios including transportation, housing, rent review and government services. He was also chairman of the Standing Committee on Public Accounts. During this session he presented a discussion paper entitled "Guidelines for Public Accounts Committees in Canada" which discussed the evolving role of this type of legislative committee.

=== Government ===
In the 1990 provincial election, the NDP won and formed a majority government under the leadership of Bob Rae. Philip had been his party's Transport Critic for the previous three years and was appointed Ontario's Minister of Transport on October 1, 1990. He became Minister of Industry, Trade and Technology on July 31, 1991, and Minister of Municipal Affairs on February 3, 1993. He was also the interim Minister of Tourism and Recreation from November 13, 1992 to February 3, 1993.

Philip was on the right wing of the NDP. He recommended greater privileges for multinational pharmaceutical companies while in government, and rejected a global warming strategy while in the Transportation portfolio. Notwithstanding this, he was generally supportive of progressive legislation and was regularly endorsed by left-leaning groups in Toronto.

The NDP were defeated in the 1995 provincial election and Philip lost the riding of Etobicoke-Rexdale to Progressive Conservative John Hastings by fewer than 900 votes. This was considered a major upset, and Philip was regarded as a favoured candidate for re-election when he ran in the redistributed seat of Etobicoke North in the 1999 provincial election.

The character of the riding had changed since the 1980s, however, and many in the riding's large community of recent immigrants had no history of supporting the NDP. Philip finished third, and Hastings was re-elected by what most considered to be a vote-split among the Liberals and NDP.

=== Cabinet positions ===
Rae ministry, Province of Ontario (1990–1995)
Cabinet posts (4)
Predecessor	Office	Successor
Dave Cooke	Minister of Municipal Affairs; 1993–1995	Al Leach
Peter North	Minister of Tourism and Recreation; 1992–1993	Ministry abolished (Note: The ministry was folded into a super-ministry called Culture, Tourism and Recreation led by Anne Swarbrick.)
Allan Pilkey	Minister of Industry, Trade and Technology; 1991–1993	Ministry abolished (Note: The ministry was folded into a super-ministry called Economic Development and Trade led by Frances Lankin.)
Bill Wrye	Minister of Transportation; 1990–1991	Gilles Pouliot
