= Lanark—Carleton (provincial electoral district) =

Lanark—Carleton was a provincial electoral district (or riding) in Ontario. It existed for the 1999 and 2003 Ontario general elections.

The riding was created when Ontario's electoral districts were re-drawn to match its federal counterparts. It was created out of parts of Carleton and Lanark-Renfrew. It was abolished into Carleton—Mississippi Mills, Lanark—Frontenac—Lennox and Addington and a small piece going to Ottawa West—Nepean. The riding consisted of Lanark County and the municipalities of West Carleton and Kanata, which were both amalgamated into Ottawa in 2001.

== Members of Provincial Parliament ==
Assembly	Years	Member	Party
Lanark—Carleton
37th	1999–2003	Norm Sterling	Progressive Conservative
38th	2003–2007	Norm Sterling	Progressive Conservative

== Election results ==
2003 Ontario general election
Party	Candidate	Votes	%	±%
Progressive Conservative	Norm Sterling	29,641	48.99	–9.41
Liberal	Marianne Wilkinson	23,466	38.79	+6.53
New Democratic	James Ronson	3,554	5.87	+0.82
Green	John Baranyi	2,564	4.24	+2.97
Family Coalition	Jim Gardiner	1,275	2.11	–0.59
Total valid votes		60,500	99.61	
Total rejected, unmarked and declined ballots		238	0.39	–0.38
Turnout		60,738	61.42	+3.30
Eligible voters		98,892		
Progressive Conservative hold		Swing		–7.97
Source: Elections Ontario

1999 Ontario general election
Party	Candidate	Votes	%
Progressive Conservative	Norm Sterling	31,364	58.40
Liberal	Dwight Eastman	17,323	32.26
New Democratic	Sheila Sansome	2,713	5.05
Family Coalition	Janne Jardine Campbell	1,450	2.70
Green	Stuart Langstaff	681	1.27
Natural Law	Angela Hea	171	0.32
Total valid votes		53,702	99.23
Total rejected, unmarked and declined ballots		416	0.77
Turnout		54,118	58.12
Eligible voters		93,116	
Progressive Conservative pickup new district.			
Source: Elections Ontario
