= Etobicoke—Rexdale =

Former provincial electoral district in Ontario, Canada

Ontario electoral district

Defunct provincial electoral district
- Legislature: Legislative Assembly of Ontario
- District created: 1987
- District abolished: 1996
- First contested: 1987
- Last contested: 1995

Demographics
- Census division: Metro Toronto
- Census subdivision: Etobicoke (now Toronto)

Etobicoke—Rexdale was a provincial electoral district in Ontario, Canada. It was created prior to the 1987 provincial election and eliminated in 1996, when its territory was incorporated into the riding of Etobicoke North. Etobicoke—Rexdale riding was created from Etobicoke. It was in the former borough of Etobicoke.

Two Members of Provincial Parliament represented the riding during its history. The most notable was Ed Philip who served in Bob Rae's cabinet in a number of roles from 1990 to 1995.

== Members of Provincial Parliament ==
Etobicoke—Rexdale
Assembly	Years	Member	Party
Created from Etobicoke in 1987
34th	1987–1990	Ed Philip	New Democratic
35th	1990–1995	Ed Philip	New Democratic
36th	1995–1999	John Hastings	Progressive Conservative
Sourced from the Ontario Legislative Assembly
Merged into Etobicoke North after 1996

== Electoral results ==
1995 Ontario general election
Party	Candidate	Votes	%	±%
Progressive Conservative	John Hastings	9,521	36.57	+24.22
New Democratic	Ed Philip	8,668	33.29	–33.78
Liberal	Lorraine Nowina	7,173	27.55	+10.09
Independent	Diane Johnston	488	1.87	–
Natural Law	Miki Staranchuk	188	0.72	–
Total valid votes		26,038	98.57	
Total rejected, unmarked and declined ballots		379	1.43	–0.32
Turnout		26,417	59.51	–1.91
Eligible voters		44,393		
Progressive Conservative gain from New Democratic		Swing		+7.06
Source: Elections Ontario

1990 Ontario general election
Party	Candidate	Votes	%	±%
New Democratic	Ed Philip	17,620	67.07	+15.03
Liberal	Aurelio Acquaviva	4,585	17.45	–18.80
Progressive Conservative	David Foster	3,243	12.34	+0.63
Green	David Burman	822	3.13	–
Total valid votes		26,270	98.25	
Total rejected, unmarked and declined ballots		469	1.75	+1.01
Turnout		26,739	61.42	+1.50
Eligible voters		43,537		
New Democratic hold		Swing		+16.92
Source: Elections Ontario

1987 Ontario general election
Party	Candidate	Votes	%
New Democratic	Ed Philip	13,892	52.04
Liberal	Jean Bickley	9,677	36.25
Progressive Conservative	Aileen Anderson	3,127	11.71
Total valid votes		26,696	99.26
Total rejected ballots		200	0.74
Turnout		26,896	59.91
Eligible voters		44,891	
New Democratic pickup new district.			
Source: Elections Ontario

== See also ==
- List of Ontario provincial electoral districts
- Canadian provincial electoral districts
