= 34th Parliament of Ontario =

Canadian provincial parliament

- Majority parliament
- Sep. 10, 1987 – Jul. 30, 1990

Parliament leaders
- Premier: David Peterson
- Leader of the Opposition: Bob Rae; 1987–1990

Party caucuses
- Government: Liberal Party
- Opposition: New Democratic Party
- Recognized: Progressive Conservative Party

Legislative Assembly
- Speaker of the Assembly: Hugh Edighoffer
- Government House leader: Sean Conway; 1987–1989
- Chris Ward; 1989–1990
- Members: 130 MPP seats
- Lieutenant governor: Lincoln Alexander; 1987–1990
← 33rd	→ 35th

The 34th Legislative Assembly of Ontario was in session from September 10, 1987, until July 30, 1990, just prior to the 1990 general election. The majority party was the Ontario Liberal Party led by David Peterson.

Hugh Edighoffer served as speaker for the assembly.

▀	▀	*	*	*	*	*	*	*	*	*	*	▀	▀	▀	▀	▀	▀	▀	▀	▀	▀
▀	▀	*	*	▀	▀	▀	▀	*	▀	▀	▀	▀	▀	▀	▀	▀	▀	▀	▀	▀	▀	▀	▀	▀
▀	▀	*	*	*	▀	▀	▀	*	▀	▀	▀	▀	▀	▀	▀	▀	▀	▀	▀	▀	▀	▀	▀	▀
▀	▀	*	*	*	*	▀	▀	▀	▀	▀	▀	▀	▀	▀	▀	▀	▀	▀	▀	▀	▀	▀	▀	▀
▀
▀	▀	*	*	*	▀	▀	▀	▀	▀	▀	▀	▀	▀	▀	▀	▀	▀	▀	▀	▀	▀	▀	▀	▀	▀
▀	▀	▀	▀	*	▀	▀	▀	▀	▀	▀	▀	▀	▀	▀	▀	▀	▀	▀	▀	▀	▀	▀	▀	▀	▀
▀	▀	▀	▀	*	▀	▀	▀	▀	▀	▀	▀	▀	▀	▀	▀	▀	▀	▀	▀	▀	▀	▀	▀	▀	▀
▀	▀	▀	▀	*	▀	▀	▀	▀	▀	▀	▀	▀	▀	▀	▀	▀	▀	▀	▀	▀	▀	▀	▀	▀

== Members ==
Riding	Member	Party	First elected / previously elected	No. of terms	Notes
Algoma	Bud Wildman	New Democratic Party	1975	5th term	
Algoma—Manitoulin	Michael A. Brown	Liberal	1987	1st term	
Beaches—Woodbine	Marion Helen Bryden	New Democratic Party	1975	5th term	
Brampton North	Carman McClelland	Liberal	1987	1st term	
Brampton South	Robert V. Callahan	Liberal	1985	2nd term	
Brant—Haldimand	Robert Fletcher Nixon	Liberal	1962	9th term	
Brantford	David Emil Neumann	Liberal	1987	1st term	
Bruce	Murray John Elston	Liberal	1981	3rd term	
Burlington South	Cam Jackson	Progressive Conservative	1985	2nd term	
Cambridge	Mike Liam Farnan	New Democratic Party	1987	1st term	
Carleton	Norm Sterling	Progressive Conservative	1977	4th term	
Carleton East	Gilles E. Morin	Liberal	1985	2nd term	
Chatham—Kent	Maurice Louis Bossy	Liberal	1985	2nd term	
Cochrane North	Jacques Noe René Fontaine	Liberal	1985	2nd term	
Cochrane South	Alan William Pope	Progressive Conservative	1977	4th term	
Cornwall	John Cleary	Liberal	1987	1st term	
Don Mills	Murad Velshi	Liberal	1987	1st term	
Dovercourt	Antonio Lupusella	Liberal	1975 (Note: First elected as a New Democrat)	5th term	
Downsview	Laureano Leone	Liberal	1987	1st term	
Dufferin—Peel	Mavis Wilson	Liberal	1987	1st term	
Durham Centre	Allan Furlong	Liberal	1987	1st term	
Durham East	Sammy Lawrence Cureatz	Progressive Conservative	1977	4th term	
Durham West	Norah Jane Stoner	Liberal	1987	1st term	
Durham—York	William George Ballinger	Liberal	1987	1st term	
Eglinton	Dianne Poole	Liberal	1987	1st term	
Elgin	Marietta L.D. Roberts	Liberal	1987	1st term	
Essex South	Remo J. Mancini	Liberal	1975	5th term	
Essex—Kent	James Fitzgerald McGuigan	Liberal	1977	4th term	
Etobicoke West	Linda Lillian LeBourdais	Liberal	1987	1st term	
Etobicoke—Humber	Jim Henderson	Liberal	1985	2nd term	
Etobicoke—Lakeshore	Ruth Anna Grier	New Democratic Party	1985	2nd term	
Etobicoke—Rexdale	Ed Thomas Philip	New Democratic Party	1975	5th term	
Fort William	Lyn McLeod	Liberal	1987	1st term	
Fort York	Robert Charles Wong	Liberal	1987	1st term	
Frontenac—Addington	Lawrence George South	Liberal	1985	2nd term	
Grey	Ronald F. Lipsett	Liberal	1987	1st term	
Guelph	Rick Eugenio Ferraro	Liberal	1985	2nd term	
Halton Centre	Barbara Sullivan	Liberal	1987	1st term	
Halton North	Walter R. Elliot	Liberal	1987	1st term	
Hamilton Centre	Lily Oddie Munro	Liberal	1985	2nd term	
Hamilton East	Bob Warren Mackenzie	New Democratic Party	1975	5th term	
Hamilton Mountain	Brian Albert Charlton	New Democratic Party	1977	4th term	
Hamilton West	Richard Alexander Allen	New Democratic Party	1982	3rd term	
Hastings—Peterborough	James Pollock	Progressive Conservative	1981	3rd term	
High Park—Swansea	David Gordon Fleet	Liberal	1987	1st term	
Huron	John Keith Riddell	Liberal	1973	6th term	
Kenora	Frank Ranover Miclash	Liberal	1987	1st term	
Kingston and the Islands	Kenneth A. Keyes	Liberal	1985	2nd term	
Kitchener	David R. Cooke	Liberal	1985	2nd term	
Kitchener—Wilmot	John Sweeney	Liberal	1975	5th term	
Lake Nipigon	Gilles Pouliot	New Democratic Party	1985	2nd term	
Lambton	David William Smith	Liberal	1985	2nd term	
Lanark—Renfrew	Douglas Jack Wiseman	Progressive Conservative	1971	6th term	
Lawrence	Joseph Cordiano	Liberal	1985	2nd term	
Leeds—Grenville	Robert W. Runciman	Progressive Conservative	1981	3rd term	
Lincoln	Harry Pelissero	Liberal	1987	1st term	
London Centre	David Robertson Peterson	Liberal	1975	5th term	Premier and Party Leader
London North	Ronald George Van Horne	Liberal	1977	4th term	Resigned seat in 1988
London North	Dianne Cunningham (1988)	Progressive Conservative	1988	1st term	Elected in by-election in 1988
London South	Elizabeth "Joan" Smith	Liberal	1985	2nd term	
Markham	W. Donald Cousens	Progressive Conservative	1981	3rd term	
Middlesex	Douglas Richard Reycraft	Liberal	1985	2nd term	
Mississauga East	John Domagoj Sola	Liberal	1987	1st term	
Mississauga North	Steven Offer	Liberal	1985	2nd term	
Mississauga South	Margaret Marland	Progressive Conservative	1985	2nd term	
Mississauga West	Steven W. Mahoney	Liberal	1987	1st term	
Muskoka—Georgian Bay	Ken Black	Liberal	1987	1st term	
Nepean	Hans W. Daigeler	Liberal	1987	1st term	
Niagara Falls	Vincent George Kerrio	Liberal	1975	5th term	
Niagara South	Raymond Louis Haggerty	Liberal	1967	7th term	
Nickel Belt	Floyd Laughren	New Democratic Party	1971	6th term	
Nipissing	Michael Harris	Progressive Conservative	1981	3rd term	Party Leader
Norfolk	Gordon Irvin Miller	Liberal	1975	5th term	
Northumberland	Joan M. Fawcett	Liberal	1987	1st term	
Oakville South	Douglas Alexander Carrothers	Liberal	1987	1st term	
Oakwood	Chaviva Milada Hošek	Liberal	1987	1st term	
Oriole	Elinor Caplan	Liberal	1985	2nd term	
Oshawa	Michael James Breaugh	New Democratic Party	1975	5th term	
Ottawa Centre	Richard Patten	Liberal	1987	1st term	
Ottawa East	Bernard C. Grandmaître	Liberal	1984	3rd term	
Ottawa South	Dalton James McGuinty	Liberal	1987	1st term	Died in 1990
Ottawa West	Bob Chiarelli	Liberal	1987	1st term	
Ottawa—Rideau	Yvonne O'Neill	Liberal	1987	1st term	
Oxford	Charles Murray Tatham	Liberal	1987	1st term	
Parkdale	Tony Ruprecht	Liberal	1981	3rd term	
Parry Sound	Ernie Eves	Progressive Conservative	1981	3rd term	
Perth	Hugh Alden Edighoffer	Liberal	1967	7th term	
Peterborough	Peter Adams	Liberal	1987	1st term	
Port Arthur	Taras Kozyra	Liberal	1987	1st term	
Prescott and Russell	Jean Poirier	Liberal	1984	3rd term	
Prince Edward—Lennox	Keith MacDonald	Liberal	1987	1st term	
Quinte	Hugh Patrick O'Neil	Liberal	1975	5th term	
Rainy River	Howard Hampton	New Democratic Party	1987	1st term	
Renfrew North	Sean Conway	Liberal	1975	5th term	
Riverdale	David R. Reville	New Democratic Party	1985	2nd term	
Sarnia	Andy Brandt	Progressive Conservative	1981	3rd term	Party Leader
Sault Ste. Marie	Karl Avid Morin-Strom	New Democratic Party	1985	2nd term	
Scarborough Centre	Cynthia Maria Nicholas	Liberal	1987	1st term	
Scarborough East	Edward A. Fulton	Liberal	1985	2nd term	
Scarborough North	Alvin Curling	Liberal	1985	2nd term	
Scarborough West	Richard Frank Johnston	New Democratic Party	1979	4th term	
Scarborough—Agincourt	Gerry Phillips	Liberal	1987	1st term	
Scarborough—Ellesmere	Frank J. Faubert	Liberal	1987	1st term	
Simcoe Centre	Bruce Owen	Liberal	1987	1st term	
Simcoe East	Allan Kenneth McLean	Progressive Conservative	1981	3rd term	
Simcoe West	George R. McCague	Progressive Conservative	1975	5th term	
St. Andrew—St. Patrick	Ronald M. Kanter	Liberal	1987	1st term	
St. Catharines	Jim Bradley	Liberal	1977	4th term	
St. Catharines—Brock	Michael Murray Dietsch	Liberal	1987	1st term	
St. George—St. David	Ian G. Scott	Liberal	1985	2nd term	
Stormont—Dundas—Glengarry	Noble Villeneuve	Progressive Conservative	1983	3rd term	
Sudbury	Sterling Campbell	Liberal	1987	1st term	
Sudbury East	Shelley Martel	New Democratic Party	1987	1st term	
Timiskaming	David Ramsay	Liberal	1985	2nd term	
Victoria—Haliburton	John F. Eakins	Liberal	1975	5th term	
Waterloo North	Herbert Arnold Epp	Liberal	1977	4th term	
Welland—Thorold	Mel Swart (Note: retired)	New Democratic Party	1975	5th term	
Welland—Thorold	Peter Kormos (1988)	New Democratic Party	1988	1st term	Elected in by-election in 1988
Wellington	John McLellan Johnson	Progressive Conservative	1975	5th term	
Wentworth East	Shirley Jean Collins	Liberal	1987	1st term	
Wentworth North	Christopher Campbell Ward	Liberal	1985	2nd term	
Willowdale	Gino Matrundola	Liberal	1987	1st term	
Wilson Heights	Monte Kwinter	Liberal	1985	2nd term	
Windsor—Riverside	Dave Cooke	New Democratic Party	1977	4th term	
Windsor—Sandwich	William Munro Wrye	Liberal	1981	3rd term	
Windsor—Walkerville	Michael Charles Ray	Liberal	1987	1st term	
York Centre	Greg Sorbara	Liberal	1985	2nd term	
York East	Christine Hart	Liberal	1986	2nd term	
York Mills	John Bradford Nixon	Liberal	1987	1st term	
York North	John Charles McWaters Beer	Liberal	1987	1st term	
York South	Bob Keith Rae	New Democratic Party	1982	3rd term	Party Leader
Yorkview	Claudio Polsinelli	Liberal	1985	2nd term	

== See also ==
- Members in Parliament 34
