= 1987 Ontario general election =

Canadian provincial election

- September 10, 1987

130 seats in the 34th Legislative Assembly of Ontario 66 seats were needed for a majority
- Turnout: 62.70%
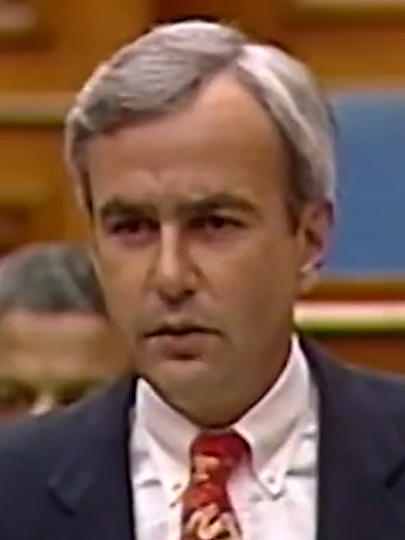

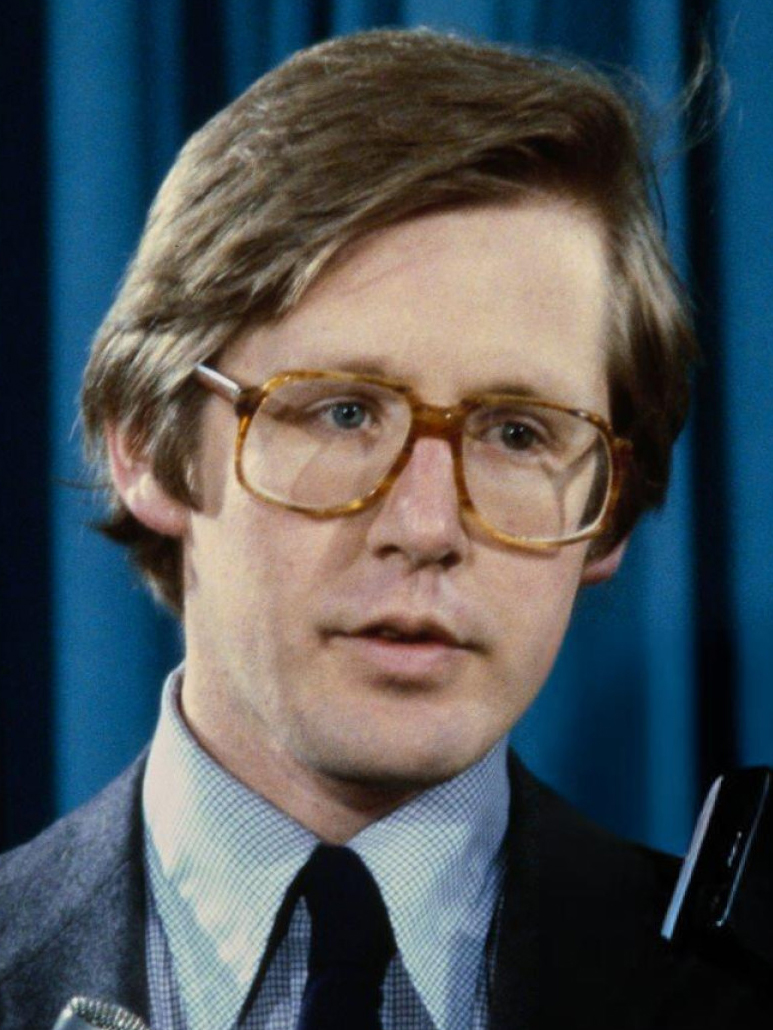

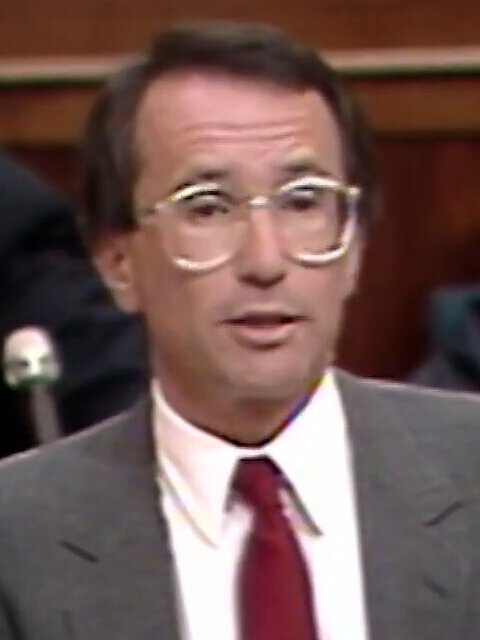
	First party	Second party	Third party
Leader	David Peterson	Bob Rae	Larry Grossman
Party	Liberal	New Democratic	Progressive Conservative
Leader since	February 21, 1982	February 7, 1982	November 16, 1985
Leader's seat	London Centre	York South	St. Andrew—St. Patrick (lost re-election)
Last election	48	25	52
Seats won	95	19	16
Seat change	▲47	▼6	▼36
Popular vote	1,788,214	970,813	931,476
Percentage	47.3%	25.7%	24.7%
Swing	▲9.4pp	▲1.9pp	▼12.3pp
- Popular vote by riding. As this is an FPTP election, seat totals are not determined by popular vote, but instead via results by each riding. Click the map for more details.
Premier before election
David Peterson
Liberal
Premier after election
David Peterson
Liberal

The 1987 Ontario general election was held on September 10, 1987, to elect members of the 34th Legislative Assembly of Ontario.

The governing Ontario Liberal Party, led by Premier David Peterson, was returned to power with their first majority government in half a century, and the second-largest majority government in the province's history. Peterson had successfully managed to govern with a minority in the Legislature by obtaining the co-operation of the Ontario New Democratic Party, led by Bob Rae, in a confidence and supply agreement. It was through the NDP's support that Peterson was able to form a government, even though the Progressive Conservative Party had won a slightly larger number of seats in the previous election.

The PC Party, led by Larry Grossman, campaigned on a platform of tax cuts to stimulate the economy. Its support continued to slide, as voters opted for the change that the Liberal-NDP arrangement provided, with Grossman losing his own seat. The PCs fell to 16 seats and third place in the legislature, their worst showing in an election in half a century.

The NDP was unable to convince the bulk of voters that it should be given credit for the success of the Liberal government that it had supported. It nevertheless did receive more votes and a larger proportion of the vote than in the previous election, although the party lost six seats due to the first-past-the-post electoral system. The party became the Official Opposition for the second time in its history.

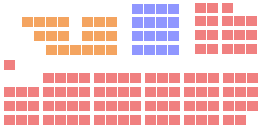

== Expansion of the Legislature ==
An Act was passed in 1986, providing for the Legislative Assembly to increase from 125 members to 130. The following changes were made:

Abolished ridings	New ridings
New ridings
	Durham Centre (Note: from parts of Durham East and Durham West)
	Lawrence (Note: from parts of York South, Downsview, Wilson Heights and Armourdale)
	Mississauga West (Note: from part of Mississauga North)
	Muskoka—Georgian Bay (Note: formed from Muskoka and part of Simcoe East)
	Nepean (Note: from part of Carleton)
	Ottawa—Rideau (Note: from parts of Carleton and Carleton East)
	Scarborough—Agincourt (Note: from part of Scarborough North)
Merger of ridings
Lanark; Renfrew South	Lanark—Renfrew
St. David; St. George	St. George—St. David
Reorganization of ridings
Armourdale	Willowdale; parts to Wilson Heights and York Mills
Bellwoods	Fort York; part to Dovercourt
Brant—Oxford—Norfolk; Haldimand—Norfolk	Brant—Haldimand; Norfolk; part to Oxford
Carleton-Grenville; Leeds	Leeds—Grenville; part to Carleton; part to Stormont, Dundas and Glengarry
Dufferin—Simcoe; Wellington—Dufferin—Peel; Wellington South	Dufferin—Peel; Guelph; Simcoe West; Wellington
Durham—York; York Centre; York North	Durham—York (Note: Whitchurch-Stouffville transferred from York North); Markham (Note: withdrawn from York North); York Centre (Note: consolidation of part of Vaughan formerly in York North); York North
Essex North; Chatham—Kent; Kent—Elgin	Essex-Kent; Chatham—Kent; part to Elgin
Etobicoke; York West	Etobicoke—Rexdale; Etobicoke West
Grey—Bruce; Huron—Bruce; Huron—Middlesex	Bruce; Huron; part to Grey; part to Middlesex
Halton—Burlington; Oakville	Halton Centre; Halton North; Oakville South
Division of ridings
Brampton	Brampton North; Brampton South
Renaming of ridings
Brock	St. Catharines—Brock
Erie	Niagara South
Grey	Grey-Owen Sound
Humber	Etobicoke—Humber
Lakeshore	Etobicoke—Lakeshore
Wentworth	Wentworth East

== Opinion polls ==
=== During campaign period ===
Evolution of voting intentions at provincial level
Polling firm	Last day of survey	Source	OLP	ONDP	PCO	Other	ME	Sample
Election 1987	September 10, 1987		47.3	25.7	24.7	2.3		
Angus Reid	September 2, 1987		48	27	23	—N/a	3.5	810
Environics	August 20, 1987		48	28	24	1	—N/a	612
Leader's debate held (August 17, 1987)
Environics	August 17, 1987		55	26	19	1	—N/a	604
Angus Reid	August 11, 1987		54	27	17	—N/a	4	606
Election called (August 1, 1987)

=== During the 33rd Parliament of Ontario ===
Evolution of voting intentions at provincial level
Polling firm	Last day of survey	Source	OLP	ONDP	PCO	Other	ME	Sample
Environics	June 21, 1987		49	23	28	1	3.2	1,007
Environics	March 16, 1987		50	24	26	0	3.2	1,008
Angus Reid	March 4, 1987		57	21	22	—N/a	4.5	597
Environics	November 1986		47	21	30	2	2	1,001
Environics	November 5, 1985		47	23	30	1	—N/a	1,007
Environics	August 11, 1985		47	23	29	1	—N/a	1,007
Election 1985	May 2, 1985		37.9	23.6	37.1	1.4		

== Results ==
Elections to the 34th Parliament of Ontario (1987)
Political party	Party leader	MPPs				Votes			
Political party	Party leader	Candidates	1985	1987	±	#	±	%	± (pp)
Liberal	David Peterson	130	48	95	47▲	1,788,214	410,249▲	47.34%	9.44▲
New Democratic	Bob Rae	130	25	19	6▼	970,813	105,306▲	25.70%	1.90▲
Progressive Conservative	Larry Grossman	130	52	16	36▼	931,473	411,571▼	24.66%	12.28▼
Family Coalition	Donald Pennell	36	–	–	–	48,110	48,110▲	1.27%	New
Independent		19	–	–	–	13,632	12,096▼	0.36%	0.35▼
Libertarian	Kaye Sargent	25	–	–	–	13,514	683▲	0.36%	–
Freedom	Robert Metz	9	–	–	–	4,735	3,152▲	0.13%	0.08▲
Communist	Gordon Massie	9	–	–	–	3,422	274▼	0.09%	0.01▼
Green		7	–	–	–	3,398	1,947▼	0.09%	0.06▼
Total		495	125	130		3,777,311		100.00%	
Rejected ballots						26,658	224▲		
Voter turnout						3,803,969	141,836▲	62.70	1.15▲
Registered electors						6,067,378	117,083▲		

=== Vote and seat summaries ===
Ternary plots - shift of electoral support (1985-1987)
1985

1987
Electoral districts identified by colours of winning parties

Seats and popular vote by party
Party	Seats	Votes	Change (pp)
█ Liberal	95 / 130	47.34%	9.44
█ New Democratic	19 / 130	25.70%	1.90
█ Progressive Conservative	16 / 130	24.66%	-12.28
█ Family Coalition	0 / 130	1.27%	1.27
█ Independent	0 / 130	0.36%	-0.35
█ Other	0 / 130	0.67%	0.02

=== Synopsis of results ===
Results by riding – 1987 Ontario general election
Riding	Winning party						Turnout (Note: including spoilt ballots)	Votes (Note: minor political parties receiving less than 1% of the popular vote are aggregated under "Other"; independent candidates are aggregated separately)						
Name (Note: order is as given in EO reports) (Note: Names are as specified in 1976 Act – EO file has errors)	1985	Party	Votes	Share	Margin #	Margin %	Turnout	Lib	NDP	PC	FCP	Ind	Other	Total
Algoma	NDP	NDP	8,562	60.90%	4,267	30.35%	68.81%	4,295	8,562	1,202	–	–	–	14,059
Algoma—Manitoulin	PC	Lib	7,157	46.05%	2,772	17.84%	62.14%	7,157	4,385	3,999	–	–	–	15,541
Beaches—Woodbine	NDP	NDP	11,948	49.74%	3,429	14.27%	61.83%	8,519	11,948	3,022	–	–	533	24,022
Brampton North	New	Lib	14,298	50.82%	7,128	25.33%	54.14%	14,298	6,667	7,170	–	–	–	28,135
Brampton South	New	Lib	17,913	52.58%	11,141	32.70%	55.25%	17,913	5,786	6,772	2,946	158	493	34,068
Brantford	PC	Lib	14,919	41.29%	2,807	7.77%	68.88%	14,919	12,112	9,104	–	–	–	36,135
Brant—Haldimand	New	Lib	14,981	59.34%	9,989	39.57%	56.83%	14,981	4,992	4,578	–	693	–	25,244
Bruce	New	Lib	17,227	60.74%	12,082	42.60%	67.68%	17,227	3,986	5,145	2,006	–	–	28,364
Burlington South	PC	PC	12,968	41.33%	605	1.93%	67.70%	12,363	4,694	12,968	1,125	–	228	31,378
Cambridge	PC	NDP	11,284	34.49%	101	0.31%	62.94%	11,183	11,284	8,752	1,500	–	–	32,719
Carleton	PC	PC	14,057	43.61%	467	1.45%	65.21%	13,590	4,590	14,057	–	–	–	32,237
Carleton East	Lib	Lib	20,706	64.09%	14,601	45.19%	60.91%	20,706	6,105	4,572	926	–	–	32,309
Chatham—Kent	Lib	Lib	13,370	46.41%	5,747	19.95%	59.60%	13,370	7,623	6,669	806	341	–	28,809
Cochrane North	Lib	Lib	9,436	57.84%	3,761	23.05%	63.19%	9,436	5,675	1,203	–	–	–	16,314
Cochrane South	PC	PC	9,735	41.92%	2,256	9.71%	62.36%	7,479	6,010	9,735	–	–	–	23,224
Cornwall	PC	Lib	10,653	40.24%	1,586	5.99%	64.33%	10,653	6,756	9,067	–	–	–	26,476
Don Mills	PC	Lib	11,083	40.70%	2,417	8.87%	59.14%	11,083	6,424	8,666	–	586	475	27,234
Dovercourt	NDP	Lib	10,634	49.17%	907	4.19%	68.02%	10,634	9,727	926	–	–	342	21,629
Downsview	Lib	Lib	11,832	46.81%	174	0.69%	63.18%	11,832	11,658	1,788	–	–	–	25,278
Dufferin—Peel	New	Lib	14,231	53.06%	5,838	21.77%	62.98%	14,231	4,195	8,393	–	–	–	26,819
Durham Centre	New	Lib	12,885	40.35%	3,004	9.41%	61.45%	12,885	9,881	8,790	–	–	378	31,934
Durham East	PC	PC	11,301	40.40%	1,435	5.13%	60.71%	9,866	6,805	11,301	–	–	–	27,972
Durham West	PC	Lib	16,733	48.78%	5,843	17.03%	59.16%	16,733	5,779	10,890	898	–	–	34,300
Durham—York	PC	Lib	12,369	40.06%	482	1.56%	58.71%	12,369	5,549	11,887	1,070	–	–	30,875
Eglinton	PC	Lib	15,106	44.74%	695	2.06%	67.73%	15,106	3,789	14,411	–	137	324	33,767
Elgin	PC	Lib	13,310	41.08%	2,437	7.52%	66.77%	13,310	7,674	10,873	–	–	546	32,403
Essex-Kent	NDP	Lib	12,541	44.78%	1,063	3.80%	65.31%	12,541	11,478	2,758	1,229	–	–	28,006
Essex South	Lib	Lib	15,292	58.94%	7,980	30.76%	55.24%	15,292	7,312	3,339	–	–	–	25,943
Etobicoke—Humber	Lib	Lib	21,644	61.05%	13,582	38.31%	66.60%	21,644	4,511	8,062	1,237	–	–	35,454
Etobicoke—Lakeshore	NDP	NDP	14,821	44.59%	2,367	7.12%	65.88%	12,454	14,821	4,760	1,203	–	–	33,238
Etobicoke—Rexdale	New	NDP	13,892	52.04%	4,215	15.79%	60.01%	9,677	13,892	3,127	–	–	–	26,696
Etobicoke West	New	Lib	15,754	46.90%	6,090	18.13%	65.98%	15,754	5,784	9,664	1,890	–	498	33,590
Fort William	PC	Lib	11,168	38.47%	1,463	5.04%	67.69%	11,168	7,861	9,705	–	–	300	29,034
Fort York	NDP	Lib	9,593	42.97%	137	0.61%	58.44%	9,593	9,456	2,084	–	335	856	22,324
Frontenac—Addington	Lib	Lib	11,628	47.08%	4,221	17.09%	61.12%	11,628	4,996	7,407	–	667	–	24,698
Grey-Owen Sound	Lib	Lib	14,298	41.41%	1,934	5.60%	64.24%	14,298	5,924	12,364	1,946	–	–	34,532
Guelph	New	Lib	18,445	55.04%	9,326	27.83%	62.23%	18,445	9,119	5,383	–	562	–	33,509
Halton Centre	New	Lib	15,833	53.03%	6,294	21.08%	59.40%	15,833	4,487	9,539	–	–	–	29,859
Halton North	New	Lib	11,644	47.80%	4,724	19.39%	57.54%	11,644	5,796	6,920	–	–	–	24,360
Hamilton Centre	Lib	Lib	13,636	51.32%	3,303	12.43%	58.76%	13,636	10,333	2,600	–	–	–	26,569
Hamilton East	NDP	NDP	16,421	56.82%	6,531	22.60%	60.25%	9,890	16,421	1,915	–	–	673	28,899
Hamilton Mountain	NDP	NDP	14,743	42.82%	1,632	4.74%	65.91%	13,111	14,743	6,580	–	–	–	34,434
Hamilton West	NDP	NDP	13,430	42.46%	1,094	3.46%	64.95%	12,336	13,430	5,862	–	–	–	31,628
Hastings—Peterborough	PC	PC	9,910	39.33%	1,205	4.78%	66.16%	8,705	6,579	9,910	–	–	–	25,194
High Park—Swansea	PC	Lib	9,637	34.56%	814	2.92%	64.94%	9,637	8,764	8,823	–	–	660	27,884
Huron	New	Lib	16,099	60.38%	9,374	35.15%	67.57%	16,099	3,841	6,725	–	–	–	26,665
Kenora	PC	Lib	7,943	40.50%	1,098	5.60%	62.15%	7,943	6,845	4,824	–	–	–	19,612
Kingston and the Islands	Lib	Lib	13,141	50.61%	6,739	25.96%	56.30%	13,141	6,402	5,910	–	–	511	25,964
Kitchener	Lib	Lib	15,373	52.35%	6,994	23.82%	56.59%	15,373	8,379	4,226	1,100	290	–	29,368
Kitchener—Wilmot	Lib	Lib	18,151	58.79%	10,648	34.49%	55.50%	18,151	7,503	5,218	–	–	–	30,872
Lake Nipigon	NDP	NDP	8,446	64.08%	4,840	36.72%	64.53%	3,606	8,446	1,129	–	–	–	13,181
Lambton	Lib	Lib	11,385	44.61%	2,559	10.03%	66.71%	11,385	2,914	8,826	2,399	–	–	25,524
Lanark—Renfrew	New	PC	13,902	42.74%	761	2.34%	60.87%	13,141	5,486	13,902	–	–	–	32,529
Lawrence	New	Lib	15,332	53.03%	7,131	24.66%	67.02%	15,332	8,201	5,379	–	–	–	28,912
Leeds—Grenville	New	PC	14,787	43.18%	198	0.58%	68.52%	14,589	4,869	14,787	–	–	–	34,245
Lincoln	PC	Lib	12,320	41.33%	1,036	3.48%	65.34%	12,320	6,207	11,284	–	–	–	29,811
London Centre	Lib	Lib	18,194	55.16%	8,928	27.07%	56.68%	18,194	9,266	3,864	695	375	589	32,983
London North	Lib	Lib	22,452	57.96%	14,491	37.41%	63.78%	22,452	7,961	7,177	611	–	537	38,738
London South	Lib	Lib	20,046	55.48%	12,323	34.10%	62.55%	20,046	7,074	7,723	861	–	430	36,134
Markham	New	PC	19,224	44.20%	681	1.57%	60.62%	18,543	4,323	19,224	1,403	–	–	43,493
Middlesex	Lib	Lib	17,600	51.50%	9,911	29.00%	65.90%	17,600	5,720	7,689	2,664	–	499	34,172
Mississauga East	PC	Lib	16,245	50.38%	5,873	18.22%	59.87%	16,245	4,864	10,372	–	–	761	32,242
Mississauga North	Lib	Lib	14,604	56.03%	8,451	32.42%	53.97%	14,604	6,153	5,309	–	–	–	26,066
Mississauga South	PC	PC	13,854	42.24%	599	1.83%	64.91%	13,255	4,976	13,854	–	–	712	32,797
Mississauga West	New	Lib	23,482	60.37%	14,344	36.87%	56.68%	23,482	6,280	9,138	–	–	–	38,900
Muskoka—Georgian Bay	New	Lib	12,645	43.45%	3,249	11.16%	65.17%	12,645	7,059	9,396	–	–	–	29,100
Nepean	New	Lib	13,951	48.45%	3,636	12.63%	62.48%	13,951	4,526	10,315	–	–	–	28,792
Niagara Falls	Lib	Lib	13,600	51.12%	5,664	21.29%	57.97%	13,600	7,936	5,066	–	–	–	26,602
Niagara South	Lib	Lib	11,740	56.49%	7,095	34.14%	56.19%	11,740	4,396	4,645	–	–	–	20,781
Nickel Belt	NDP	NDP	9,849	58.21%	5,986	35.38%	70.23%	3,863	9,849	3,208	–	–	–	16,920
Nipissing	PC	PC	15,744	50.68%	4,054	13.05%	68.81%	11,690	2,961	15,744	672	–	–	31,067
Norfolk	New	Lib	17,313	55.14%	8,967	28.56%	63.03%	17,313	8,346	5,742	–	–	–	31,401
Northumberland	PC	Lib	14,451	43.82%	1,376	4.17%	66.97%	14,451	4,372	13,075	836	–	242	32,976
Oakville South	New	Lib	13,241	44.69%	1,291	4.36%	64.82%	13,241	3,080	11,950	–	–	1,357	29,628
Oakwood	NDP	Lib	11,192	48.28%	1,331	5.74%	67.29%	11,192	9,861	1,573	–	–	556	23,182
Oriole	Lib	Lib	16,206	59.68%	10,547	38.84%	65.01%	16,206	4,470	5,659	–	–	822	27,157
Oshawa	NDP	NDP	12,957	45.85%	2,916	10.32%	54.07%	10,041	12,957	4,076	1,184	–	–	28,258
Ottawa Centre	NDP	Lib	13,867	47.16%	2,087	7.10%	63.17%	13,867	11,780	3,159	–	598	–	29,404
Ottawa East	Lib	Lib	18,959	74.26%	14,822	58.05%	53.07%	18,959	4,137	2,435	–	–	–	25,531
Ottawa—Rideau	New	Lib	14,179	50.20%	6,111	21.63%	59.42%	14,179	6,000	8,068	–	–	–	28,247
Ottawa South	PC	Lib	15,952	50.88%	6,587	21.01%	67.65%	15,952	6,038	9,365	–	–	–	31,355
Ottawa West	PC	Lib	16,343	50.46%	6,392	19.74%	61.61%	16,343	4,403	9,951	1,689	–	–	32,386
Oxford	PC	Lib	14,939	42.10%	2,874	8.10%	68.24%	14,939	6,606	12,065	1,410	–	466	35,486
Parkdale	Lib	Lib	13,430	69.46%	9,469	48.98%	62.53%	13,430	3,961	798	389	289	467	19,334
Parry Sound	PC	PC	11,332	53.59%	4,397	20.79%	64.25%	6,935	2,231	11,332	647	–	–	21,145
Perth	Lib	Lib	18,037	61.20%	11,957	40.57%	63.15%	18,037	6,080	5,357	–	–	–	29,474
Peterborough	PC	Lib	15,098	40.13%	4,457	11.85%	63.74%	15,098	10,641	8,480	3,057	–	344	37,620
Port Arthur	NDP	Lib	13,747	45.83%	1,919	6.40%	67.85%	13,747	11,828	4,419	–	–	–	29,994
Prescott and Russell	Lib	Lib	26,811	75.80%	22,351	63.19%	60.06%	26,811	4,460	4,100	–	–	–	35,371
Prince Edward—Lennox	PC	Lib	11,961	45.02%	2,079	7.83%	61.23%	11,961	4,724	9,882	–	–	–	26,567
Quinte	Lib	Lib	17,151	62.08%	10,608	38.40%	57.23%	17,151	3,520	6,543	–	–	413	27,627
Rainy River	PC	NDP	5,538	40.55%	907	6.64%	71.54%	4,631	5,538	3,487	–	–	–	13,656
Renfrew North	Lib	Lib	18,507	62.73%	12,855	43.57%	67.16%	18,507	3,958	5,652	1,385	–	–	29,502
Riverdale	NDP	NDP	10,321	44.89%	1,769	7.69%	61.03%	8,552	10,321	3,285	–	–	832	22,990
St. Andrew—St. Patrick	PC	Lib	14,159	45.66%	3,676	11.85%	64.52%	14,159	5,608	10,483	–	–	761	31,011
St. Catharines	Lib	Lib	17,584	63.30%	12,018	43.27%	62.49%	17,584	5,566	4,258	–	–	369	27,777
St. Catharines—Brock	PC	Lib	10,822	41.37%	2,001	7.65%	63.41%	10,822	6,514	8,821	–	–	–	26,157
St. George—St. David	New	Lib	15,051	51.15%	7,055	23.98%	61.88%	15,051	5,658	7,996	–	–	721	29,426
Sarnia	PC	PC	12,964	43.43%	2,661	8.91%	65.67%	10,303	4,552	12,964	1,475	–	559	29,853
Sault Ste. Marie	NDP	NDP	19,064	49.00%	2,683	6.90%	70.41%	16,381	19,064	3,464	–	–	–	38,909
Scarborough—Agincourt	New	Lib	19,101	57.53%	12,080	36.39%	63.42%	19,101	7,021	6,284	–	–	794	33,200
Scarborough Centre	PC	Lib	11,921	41.05%	3,396	11.69%	64.59%	11,921	8,525	7,217	827	550	–	29,040
Scarborough East	Lib	Lib	16,944	55.39%	9,896	32.35%	59.24%	16,944	7,048	5,390	–	–	1,206	30,588
Scarborough—Ellesmere	NDP	Lib	12,422	41.67%	481	1.61%	63.71%	12,422	11,941	5,445	–	–	–	29,808
Scarborough North	Lib	Lib	20,021	63.03%	14,160	44.58%	59.85%	20,021	4,509	5,861	1,371	–	–	31,762
Scarborough West	NDP	NDP	13,330	46.25%	3,236	11.23%	61.61%	10,094	13,330	3,881	1,035	–	483	28,823
Simcoe Centre	PC	Lib	15,474	43.32%	2,492	6.98%	62.47%	15,474	7,265	12,982	–	–	–	35,721
Simcoe East	PC	PC	12,543	36.91%	806	2.37%	66.97%	11,737	9,699	12,543	–	–	–	33,979
Simcoe West	New	PC	11,678	41.95%	306	1.10%	61.05%	11,372	4,788	11,678	–	–	–	27,838
Stormont, Dundas and Glengarry	PC	PC	10,771	38.38%	607	2.16%	67.03%	10,164	2,345	10,771	–	4,784	–	28,064
Sudbury	PC	Lib	12,788	39.36%	2,630	8.09%	67.41%	12,788	9,260	10,158	–	285	–	32,491
Sudbury East	NDP	NDP	15,179	54.98%	5,639	20.42%	68.25%	9,540	15,179	2,890	–	–	–	27,609
Timiskaming	NDP	Lib	10,218	48.87%	4,347	20.79%	69.99%	10,218	5,871	4,820	–	–	–	20,909
Victoria—Haliburton	Lib	Lib	16,287	56.56%	10,431	36.22%	62.96%	16,287	4,251	5,856	2,403	–	–	28,797
Waterloo North	Lib	Lib	16,792	52.35%	8,111	25.29%	56.92%	16,792	5,785	8,681	–	–	818	32,076
Welland-Thorold	NDP	NDP	17,490	57.88%	7,635	25.27%	68.68%	9,855	17,490	2,167	706	–	–	30,218
Wellington	New	PC	10,797	41.07%	463	1.76%	62.53%	10,334	5,159	10,797	–	–	–	26,290
Wentworth East	PC	Lib	16,153	52.31%	7,477	24.21%	64.32%	16,153	8,676	5,577	–	475	–	30,881
Wentworth North	Lib	Lib	16,150	54.02%	9,043	30.25%	65.00%	16,150	6,641	7,107	–	–	–	29,898
Willowdale	PC	Lib	15,543	45.97%	4,034	11.93%	63.33%	15,543	5,774	11,509	–	–	985	33,811
Wilson Heights	Lib	Lib	17,007	57.49%	10,310	34.85%	63.16%	17,007	6,697	5,879	–	–	–	29,583
Windsor—Riverside	NDP	NDP	17,162	57.65%	5,905	19.84%	65.20%	11,257	17,162	842	509	–	–	29,770
Windsor—Sandwich	Lib	Lib	14,888	50.66%	2,353	8.01%	58.92%	14,888	12,535	1,965	–	–	–	29,388
Windsor—Walkerville	Lib	Lib	14,361	48.41%	946	3.19%	63.36%	14,361	13,415	1,553	–	–	335	29,664
York Centre	PC	Lib	27,096	62.44%	18,491	42.61%	55.59%	27,096	7,692	8,605	–	–	–	43,393
York East	PC	Lib	15,683	51.22%	8,331	27.21%	64.66%	15,683	7,056	7,352	–	–	527	30,618
York Mills	PC	Lib	14,272	47.54%	2,297	7.65%	67.77%	14,272	3,195	11,975	–	–	582	30,024
York North	Lib	Lib	14,177	48.45%	5,185	17.72%	60.03%	14,177	6,092	8,992	–	–	–	29,261
York South	NDP	NDP	13,190	47.10%	333	1.19%	70.46%	12,857	13,190	1,544	–	–	411	28,002
Yorkview	Lib	Lib	11,449	52.48%	5,301	24.30%	61.33%	11,449	6,148	1,037	–	2,507	674	21,815

= open seat
= turnout is above provincial average
= winning candidate was in previous Legislature
= not incumbent; was previously elected to the Legislature
= incumbent had switched allegiance
= incumbency arose from byelection gain
= previously incumbent in another riding
= other incumbents renominated
= previously an MP in the House of Commons of Canada
= multiple candidates

=== Comparative analysis for ridings (1987 vs 1985) ===
Summary of riding results by turnout and vote share for winning candidate (vs 1985) (Note: Summarized from "Data Explorer". Elections Ontario.)
Riding and winning party			Turnout		Vote share	
Riding and winning party			%	Change (pp)	%	Change (pp)
Algoma	NDP	Hold	68.81	-1.82	60.90	7.79
Algoma—Manitoulin	Lib	Gain	62.14	6.66	46.05	15.08
Beaches—Woodbine	NDP	Hold	61.83	-3.29	49.74	-0.09
Brampton North	Lib	New	54.14	New	50.82	New
Brampton South	Lib	New	55.25	New	52.58	New
Brantford	Lib	Gain	68.88	4.02	41.29	21.05
Brant—Haldimand	Lib	New	56.83	New	59.34	New
Bruce	Lib	New	67.68	New	60.74	New
Burlington South	PC	Hold	67.70	4.65	41.33	-0.79
Cambridge	NDP	Gain	62.94	2.75	34.49	-3.02
Carleton	PC	Hold	65.21	7.36	43.61	-0.74
Carleton East	Lib	Hold	60.91	3.32	64.09	15.95
Chatham—Kent	Lib	Hold	59.60	0.75	46.41	5.18
Cochrane North	Lib	Hold	63.19	-5.59	57.84	10.45
Cochrane South	PC	Hold	62.36	-0.27	41.92	-17.13
Cornwall	Lib	Gain	64.33	4.93	40.24	10.74
Don Mills	Lib	Gain	59.14	1.61	40.70	16.11
Dovercourt	Lib	Gain	68.02	0.27	49.17	10.66
Downsview	Lib	Hold	63.18	-2.40	46.81	2.88
Dufferin—Peel	Lib	New	62.98	New	53.06	New
Durham Centre	Lib	New	61.45	New	40.35	New
Durham East	PC	Hold	60.71	2.57	40.40	-6.19
Durham West	Lib	Gain	59.16	2.77	48.78	14.97
Durham—York	Lib	Gain	58.71	-0.12	40.06	7.02
Eglinton	Lib	Gain	67.73	0.31	44.74	4.09
Elgin	Lib	Gain	66.77	4.68	41.08	8.04
Essex-Kent	Lib	New	65.31	New	44.78	New
Essex South	Lib	Hold	55.24	-5.84	58.94	11.72
Etobicoke—Humber	Lib	Hold	66.60	-0.26	61.05	15.13
Etobicoke—Lakeshore	NDP	Hold	65.88	-2.05	44.59	4.70
Etobicoke—Rexdale	NDP	New	60.01	New	52.04	New
Etobicoke West	Lib	New	65.98	New	46.90	New
Fort William	Lib	Gain	67.69	3.85	38.47	20.96
Fort York	Lib	Gain	58.44	-8.88	42.97	3.90
Frontenac—Addington	Lib	Hold	61.12	-0.01	47.08	1.52
Grey-Owen Sound	Lib	Hold	64.24	0.74	41.41	-23.77
Guelph	Lib	New	62.23	New	55.04	New
Halton Centre	Lib	New	59.40	New	53.03	New
Halton North	Lib	New	57.54	New	47.80	New
Hamilton Centre	Lib	Hold	58.76	1.91	51.32	7.31
Hamilton East	NDP	Hold	60.25	-0.78	56.82	13.03
Hamilton Mountain	NDP	Hold	65.91	-3.37	42.82	-1.42
Hamilton West	NDP	Hold	64.95	3.00	42.46	5.05
Hastings—Peterborough	PC	Hold	66.16	5.86	39.33	-15.57
High Park—Swansea	Lib	Gain	64.94	-5.08	34.56	13.20
Huron	Lib	New	67.57	New	60.38	New
Kenora	Lib	Gain	62.15	1.20	40.50	28.55
Kingston and the Islands	Lib	Hold	56.30	-0.05	50.61	4.28
Kitchener	Lib	Hold	56.59	-2.01	52.35	5.48
Kitchener—Wilmot	Lib	Hold	55.50	0.25	58.79	4.41
Lake Nipigon	NDP	Hold	64.53	0.08	64.08	22.38
Lambton	Lib	Hold	66.71	-0.93	44.61	-2.92
Lanark—Renfrew	PC	New	60.87	New	42.74	New
Lawrence	Lib	New	67.02	New	53.03	New
Leeds—Grenville	PC	New	68.52	New	43.18	New
Lincoln	Lib	Gain	65.34	-2.48	41.33	4.62
London Centre	Lib	Hold	56.68	3.87	55.16	0.36
London North	Lib	Hold	63.78	3.64	57.96	3.52
London South	Lib	Hold	62.55	-0.36	55.48	4.45
Markham	PC	New	60.62	New	44.20	New
Middlesex	Lib	Hold	65.90	-2.13	51.50	4.34
Mississauga East	Lib	Gain	59.87	2.36	50.38	18.96
Mississauga North	Lib	Hold	53.97	-0.56	56.03	14.34
Mississauga South	PC	Hold	64.91	4.97	42.24	-2.34
Mississauga West	Lib	New	56.68	New	60.37	New
Muskoka—Georgian Bay	Lib	New	65.17	New	43.45	New
Nepean	Lib	New	62.48	New	48.45	New
Niagara Falls	Lib	Hold	57.97	-3.06	51.12	2.35
Niagara South	Lib	Hold	56.19	-4.72	56.49	1.92
Nickel Belt	NDP	Hold	70.23	-0.16	58.21	5.83
Nipissing	PC	Hold	68.81	4.15	50.68	0.82
Norfolk	Lib	New	63.03	New	55.14	New
Northumberland	Lib	Gain	66.97	3.10	43.82	2.32
Oakville South	Lib	New	64.82	New	44.69	New
Oakwood	Lib	Gain	67.29	-1.33	48.28	9.76
Oriole	Lib	Hold	65.01	-0.22	59.68	10.62
Oshawa	NDP	Hold	54.07	-0.64	45.85	-4.39
Ottawa Centre	Lib	Gain	63.17	3.99	47.16	21.20
Ottawa East	Lib	Hold	53.07	3.92	74.26	5.86
Ottawa—Rideau	Lib	New	59.42	New	50.20	New
Ottawa South	Lib	Gain	67.65	4.02	50.88	15.53
Ottawa West	Lib	Gain	61.61	2.18	50.46	12.94
Oxford	Lib	Gain	68.24	7.54	42.10	9.93
Parkdale	Lib	Hold	62.53	-4.16	69.46	6.80
Parry Sound	PC	Hold	64.25	-5.33	53.59	3.06
Perth	Lib	Hold	63.15	0.92	61.20	-8.12
Peterborough	Lib	Gain	63.74	3.49	40.13	15.32
Port Arthur	Lib	Gain	67.85	4.80	45.83	24.62
Prescott and Russell	Lib	Hold	60.06	-0.28	75.80	17.84
Prince Edward—Lennox	Lib	Gain	61.23	3.69	45.02	9.35
Quinte	Lib	Hold	57.23	-3.50	62.08	-1.02
Rainy River	NDP	Gain	71.54	4.29	40.55	3.17
Renfrew North	Lib	Hold	67.16	3.56	62.73	-3.72
Riverdale	NDP	Hold	61.03	-0.66	44.89	-7.26
St. Andrew—St. Patrick	Lib	Gain	64.52	0.57	45.66	20.86
St. Catharines	Lib	Hold	62.49	0.84	63.30	5.36
St. Catharines—Brock	Lib	Gain	63.41	0.30	41.37	2.64
St. George—St. David	Lib	New	61.88	New	51.15	New
Sarnia	PC	Hold	65.67	5.68	43.43	-17.82
Sault Ste. Marie	NDP	Hold	70.41	5.93	49.00	4.15
Scarborough—Agincourt	Lib	New	63.42	New	57.53	New
Scarborough Centre	Lib	Gain	64.59	6.81	41.05	6.92
Scarborough East	Lib	Hold	59.24	0.97	55.39	7.18
Scarborough—Ellesmere	Lib	Gain	63.71	0.09	41.67	16.99
Scarborough North	Lib	Hold	59.85	2.18	63.03	15.52
Scarborough West	NDP	Hold	61.61	1.14	46.25	-6.94
Simcoe Centre	Lib	Gain	62.47	1.68	43.32	6.60
Simcoe East	PC	Hold	66.97	3.46	36.91	-4.95
Simcoe West	PC	New	61.05	New	41.95	New
Stormont, Dundas and Glengarry	PC	Hold	67.03	5.09	38.38	-21.65
Sudbury	Lib	Gain	67.41	6.76	39.36	15.03
Sudbury East	NDP	Hold	68.25	5.04	54.98	0.32
Timiskaming	Lib	Gain	69.99	-1.12	48.87	39.31
Victoria—Haliburton	Lib	Hold	62.96	-4.13	56.56	5.63
Waterloo North	Lib	Hold	56.92	-1.88	52.35	-2.25
Welland-Thorold	NDP	Hold	68.68	1.96	57.88	-1.56
Wellington	PC	New	62.53	New	41.07	New
Wentworth East	Lib	Gain	64.32	3.19	52.31	20.18
Wentworth North	Lib	Hold	65.00	-0.33	54.02	6.28
Willowdale	Lib	Gain	63.33	-5.10	45.97	5.36
Wilson Heights	Lib	Hold	63.16	-1.10	57.49	16.73
Windsor—Riverside	NDP	Hold	65.20	7.92	57.65	-3.97
Windsor—Sandwich	Lib	Hold	58.92	2.42	50.66	2.31
Windsor—Walkerville	Lib	Hold	63.36	4.79	48.41	8.38
York Centre	Lib	Gain	55.59	-1.52	62.44	26.23
York East	Lib	Gain	64.66	0.14	51.22	28.05
York Mills	Lib	Gain	67.77	6.65	47.54	20.47
York North	Lib	Hold	60.03	0.87	48.45	1.67
York South	NDP	Hold	70.46	3.93	47.10	-6.92
Yorkview	Lib	Hold	61.33	0.61	52.48	2.64

=== Analysis ===
Party candidates in 2nd place
Party in 1st place	Party in 2nd place			Total
Party in 1st place	Lib	NDP	PC	Total
Liberal		43	52	95
New Democratic	19			19
Progressive Conservative	16			16
Total	35	43	52	130

Candidates ranked 1st to 5th place, by party
Parties	1st	2nd	3rd	4th	5th
█ Liberal	95	35			
█ New Democratic	19	43	67	1	
█ Progressive Conservative	16	52	61	1	
█ Independent			2	7	4
█ Family Coalition				36	
█ Libertarian				15	9
█ Communist				6	1
█ Green				4	3
█ Freedom				3	5

Resulting composition of the 28th Legislative Assembly
Source		Party			
Source		Lib	NDP	PC	Total
Seats retained	Incumbents returned	35	15	10	60
Seats retained	Open seats held	4	1	1	6
Seats changing hands	Incumbents defeated	21	2		23
Seats changing hands	Open seats gained	11			11
Seats changing hands	Byelection gain held	1			1
Seats changing hands	Incumbent changing allegiance	1			1
New seats	New MPPs	15			5
New seats	Previously incumbent	7	1	5	13
Total		95	19	16	130

=== Significant results among independent and minor party candidates ===
Those candidates not belonging to a major party, receiving more than 1,000 votes in the election, are listed below:

Riding	Party	Candidates	Votes	Placed
Oakville South	█ Green	Christopher Kowalchuk	1,357	4th
Stormont—Dundas—Glengarry	█ Independent	Gordon McGregor	4,784	3rd
Yorkview	█ Independent	Tony Marzilli	2,507	3rd

=== MPPs elected by region and riding ===
Party designations are as follows:

Liberal
NDP
PC

Northern Ontario

- Algoma: Bud Wildman
- Algoma—Manitoulin : Michael Brown
- Cochrane North: René Fontaine
- Cochrane South: Alan Pope
- Fort William: Lyn McLeod
- Kenora: Frank Miclash
- Lake Nipigon: Gilles Pouliot
- Nickel Belt: Floyd Laughren
- Nipissing: Mike Harris
- Port Arthur: Taras Kozyra
- Rainy River: Howard Hampton
- Sault Ste. Marie: Karl Morin-Strom
- Sudbury: Sterling Campbell
- Sudbury East: Shelley Martel
- Timiskaming: David Ramsay

Ottawa Valley

- Carleton: Norm Sterling
- Carleton East: Gilles Morin
- Lanark—Renfrew: Douglas Wiseman
- Nepean: Hans Daigeler
- Ottawa Centre: Richard Patten
- Ottawa East: Bernard Grandmaître
- Ottawa—Rideau: Yvonne O'Neill
- Ottawa South: Dalton McGuinty, Sr.
- Ottawa West: Bob Chiarelli
- Prescott and Russell: Jean Poirier
- Renfrew North: Sean Conway

Saint Lawrence Valley

- Cornwall: John Cleary
- Kingston and the Islands: Ken Keyes
- Leeds—Grenville: Bob Runciman
- Stormont—Dundas—Glengarry: Noble Villeneuve

Central Ontario

- Frontenac—Addington: Larry South
- Hastings-Peterborough: Jim Pollock
- Northumberland: Joan Fawcett
- Peterborough: Peter Adams
- Prince Edward—Lennox: Keith MacDonald
- Quinte: Hugh O'Neil
- Victoria—Haliburton: John Eakins

Georgian Bay

- Bruce: Murray Elston
- Grey: Ron Lipsett
- Muskoka—Georgian Bay: Ken Black
- Parry Sound: Ernie Eves
- Simcoe Centre: Bruce Owen
- Simcoe East: Al McLean
- Simcoe West: George R. McCague

Hamilton/Halton/Niagara

- Burlington South: Cam Jackson
- Halton Centre: Barbara Sullivan
- Halton North: Walt Elliot
- Hamilton Centre: Lily Oddie Munro
- Hamilton East: Robert W. Mackenzie
- Hamilton Mountain: Brian Charlton
- Hamilton West: Richard Allen
- Lincoln: Harry Pelissero
- Niagara Falls: Vince Kerrio
- Niagara South: Ray Haggerty
- Oakville South: Doug Carrothers
- St. Catharines: Jim Bradley
- St. Catharines—Brock: Mike Dietsch
- Welland-Thorold: Mel Swart
- Wentworth East: Shirley Collins
- Wentworth North: Chris Ward

Midwestern Ontario

- Brantford: Dave Neumann
- Brant—Haldimand: Robert Nixon
- Cambridge: Mike Farnan
- Dufferin—Peel: Mavis Wilson
- Guelph: Rick Ferraro
- Huron: Jack Riddell
- Kitchener: David R. Cooke
- Kitchener—Wilmot: John Sweeney
- Norfolk: Gordon Miller
- Oxford: Charlie Tatham
- Perth: Hugh Edighoffer
- Waterloo North: Herb Epp
- Wellington: Jack Johnson

Southwestern Ontario

- Chatham—Kent: Maurice Bossy
- Elgin: Marietta Roberts
- Essex-Kent: Jim McGuigan
- Essex South: Remo Mancini
- Lambton: David William Smith
- London Centre: David Peterson
- London North: Ron Van Horne
- London South: Elizabeth Joan Smith
- Middlesex: Doug Reycraft
- Sarnia: Andy Brandt
- Windsor—Riverside: Dave Cooke
- Windsor—Sandwich: Bill Wrye
- Windsor—Walkerville: Mike Ray

Peel/York/Durham

- Brampton North: Carman McClelland
- Brampton South: Bob Callahan
- Durham Centre: Allan Furlong
- Durham East: Sam Cureatz
- Durham West: Norah Stoner
- Durham—York: Bill Ballinger
- Markham: Don Cousens
- Mississauga East: John Sola
- Mississauga North: Steven Offer
- Mississauga South: Margaret Marland
- Mississauga West: Steve Mahoney
- Oshawa: Michael Breaugh
- York Centre: Greg Sorbara
- York North: Charles Beer

Metropolitan Toronto

- Beaches—Woodbine: Marion Bryden
- Don Mills: Murad Velshi
- Dovercourt: Tony Lupusella
- Downsview: Laureano Leone
- Eglinton: Dianne Poole
- Etobicoke—Humber: Jim Henderson
- Etobicoke—Lakeshore: Ruth Grier
- Etobicoke—Rexdale: Ed Philip
- Etobicoke West: Linda LeBourdais
- Fort York: Bob Wong
- High Park—Swansea: David Fleet
- Lawrence: Joseph Cordiano
- Oakwood: Chaviva Hošek
- Oriole: Elinor Caplan
- Parkdale: Tony Ruprecht
- Riverdale: David Reville
- St. Andrew—St. Patrick: Ron Kanter
- St. George—St. David: Ian Scott
- Scarborough—Agincourt: Gerry Phillips
- Scarborough Centre: Cindy Nicholas
- Scarborough East: Ed Fulton
- Scarborough—Ellesmere: Frank Faubert
- Scarborough North: Alvin Curling
- Scarborough West: Richard Johnston
- Willowdale: Gino Matrundola
- Wilson Heights: Monte Kwinter
- York East: Christine Hart
- York Mills: Brad Nixon
- York South: Bob Rae
- Yorkview: Claudio Polsinelli

== Riding results ==
=== Algoma ===
Ontario general election, 1987
Party	Candidate	Votes	%	±%
New Democratic	Bud Wildman	8,562	60.90	
Liberal	Bryan McDougall	4,295	30.55	
Progressive Conservative	Denise Chenier	1,202	8.55	
{{{2}}}	{{{3}}}			

=== Algoma—Manitoulin ===
Ontario general election, 1987
Party	Candidate	Votes	%	±%
Liberal	Mike Brown	7,157	46.05	
New Democratic	Ron Boucher	4,385	28.22	
Progressive Conservative	Ben Wilson	3,999	25.73	

=== Beaches—Woodbine ===
- (incumbent) Marion Bryden (NDP) 19948
- Patricia Herdman (L) 8519
- John Beveridge (PC) 3022
- Steve Thistle (Lbt) 533

=== Brampton North ===
Ontario general election, 1987
Party	Candidate	Votes	%	±%
Liberal	Carman McClelland	14,298	50.82	
Progressive Conservative	Jo-Anne Robertson	7,170	25.48	
New Democratic	John Deamer	6,667	23.70	

=== Brampton South ===
- (incumbent) Bob Callahan (L) 17913
- Frank Russell (PC) 6772
- Paul Ledgister (NDP) 5786
- Don Best (FCP) 2946
- Jim Bridgewood (Comm) 268
- Garnet Brace (Lbt) 225
- Malcolm Cook 158

=== Brantford ===
Ontario general election, 1987
Party	Candidate	Votes	%	±%
Liberal	Dave Neumann	14,919	41.17	
New Democratic	Jack Tubman	12,212	33.70	
Progressive Conservative	Phil Gillies	9,104	25.13	

=== Brant-Haldimand ===
Ontario general election, 1987
Party	Candidate	Votes	%	±%
Liberal	(incumbent) Robert Nixon	14,981	59.34	
New Democratic	Tracy Macdonnell	4,992	19.77	
Progressive Conservative	Ann Wilson	4,578	18.14	
Other	George Molson Barrett	693	2.75	

=== Bruce ===
Ontario general election, 1987
Party	Candidate	Votes	%	±%
Liberal	(incumbent) Murray Elston	17,227	60.74	
Progressive Conservative	Mike Snobelen	5,145	18.14	
New Democratic	Norma Peterson	3,986	14.05	
Family Coalition	Adrian Keet	2,006	7.07	

=== Burlington South ===
- (incumbent) Cam Jackson (PC) 12968
- Bill Priestner (L) 12363
- Judy Worsley (NDP) 4694
- Don Pennell (FCP) 1125
- Dan Riga (Lbt) 228

=== Cambridge ===
- Mike Farnan (NDP) 11284
- Claudette Millar (L) 11183
- (incumbent) Bill Barlow (PC) 8752
- Anneliese Steden (FCP) 1500

=== Carleton ===
Ontario general election, 1987
Party	Candidate	Votes	%	±%
Progressive Conservative	Norm Sterling	14,057		
Liberal	Roland Armitage	13,590		
New Democratic	Elaine Gibson	4,590		

=== Carleton East ===
- (incumbent) Gilles Morin (L) 20706
- Joan Gullen (NDP) 6105
- Roland Saumure (PC) 4572
- Andre Lafrance (FCP) 926

=== Chatham—Kent ===
- (incumbent) Maurice Bossy (L) 13370
- Brian Rice (NDP) 7623
- Ron Anderson (PC) 6669
- Marcy Edwards (FCP) 806
- Don Carnegie 341

=== Cochrane North ===
Ontario general election, 1987
Party	Candidate	Votes	%	±%
Liberal	René Fontaine	9,436		
New Democratic	Len Wood	5,675		
Progressive Conservative	Denis Latulippe	1,203		

=== Cochrane South ===
Ontario general election, 1987
Party	Candidate	Votes	%	±%
Progressive Conservative	Alan Pope	9,735		
Liberal	Conrad Carrière	7,479		
New Democratic	Gilles Renaud	6,010		

=== Cornwall ===
Ontario general election, 1987
Party	Candidate	Votes	%	±%
Liberal	John Cleary	10,653		
Progressive Conservative	Luc Guindon	9,067		
New Democratic	Bob Roth	6,756		

=== Don Mills ===
- Murad Velshi (L) 11083
- David Lindsay (PC) 8666
- Margery Ward (NDP) 6424
- David Smith 586
- David Pengelly (F) 475

=== Dovercourt ===
- (incumbent) Tony Lupusella (L) 10634
- (incumbent) Ross McClellan (NDP) 9727
- Norm Panziza, Jr. (PC) 926
- D'Arcy Cain (Lbt) 342

=== Downsview ===
Ontario general election, 1987
Party	Candidate	Votes	%	±%
Liberal	Laureano Leone	11,832		
New Democratic	Maria Augimeri	11,658		
Progressive Conservative	Drew McCreadie	1,788		

=== Dufferin—Peel ===
Ontario general election, 1987
Party	Candidate	Votes	%	±%
Liberal	Mavis Wilson	14,231	53.06	
Progressive Conservative	Charlie Byran	8,393	31.29	
New Democratic	Sandra Crane	4,195	15.64	
Total valid votes		26,819	100.00	–

=== Durham Centre ===
- Allan Furlong (L) 12885
- Sarah Kelly (NDP) 9881
- Stephanie Ball (PC) 8790
- Harold Tauscah (G) 378

=== Durham East ===
Ontario general election, 1987
Party	Candidate	Votes	%	±%
Progressive Conservative	Sam Cureatz	11,301		
Liberal	Diane Hamre	9,866		
New Democratic	Marg Wilbur	6,805		

=== Durham West ===
- Norah Stoner (L) 16733
- (incumbent) George Ashe (PC) 10890
- Jim Wiseman (NDP) 5779
- Bert Vermeer (FCP) 898

=== Durham—York ===
- Bill Ballinger (L) 12369
- (incumbent) Ross Stevenson (PC) 11887
- Donna Kelly (NDP) 5549
- Ken Canning (FCP) 1070

=== Eglinton ===
- Dianne Poole (L) 15106
- (incumbent) David McFadden (PC) 14411
- Michael Lee (NDP) 3789
- Richard Lubbock (Lbt) 324
- John Stifel 137

=== Elgin ===
- Marietta Roberts (L) 13310
- (incumbent) Ron McNeil (PC) 10873
- Gord Campbell (NDP) 7674
- Ray Monteith (F) 546

=== Essex—Kent ===
- (incumbent) Jim McGuigan (L) 12591
- (incumbent) Pat Hayes (NDP) 11478
- John Ashton (PC) 2758
- Tim McGuire (FCP) 1229

=== Essex South ===
Ontario general election, 1987
Party	Candidate	Votes	%	±%
Liberal	Remo Mancini	15,292		
New Democratic	Marv Ewing	7,312		
Progressive Conservative	Scott Cowan	3,339		

=== Etobicoke—Humber ===
- (incumbent) Jim Henderson (L) 21644
- Avie Flaherty (PC) 8062
- Peter Sutherland (NDP) 4511
- George Hartwell (FCP) 1237

=== Etobicoke—Lakeshore ===
- (incumbent) Ruth Grier (NDP) 14821
- Frank Sgarlata (L) 12454
- Al Kolyn (PC) 4760
- Michael Doyle (FCP) 1203

=== Etobicoke—Rexdale ===
Ontario general election, 1987
Party	Candidate	Votes	%	±%
New Democratic	Ed Philip	13,892		
Liberal	Jean Bickley	9,677		
Progressive Conservative	Aileen Anderson	3,127		

=== Etobicoke West ===
- Linda LeBourdais (L) 15757
- Doug Holyday (PC) 9664
- Phil Jones (NDP) 5784
- Judy Johnson (FCP) 1890
- Robert Dunk (Lbt) 498

=== Fort William ===
- Lyn McLeod (L) 11168
- (incumbent) Mickey Hennessy (PC) 9705
- Don Smith (NDP) 7861
- John Maclennan (Comm) 300

=== Fort York ===
- Bob Wong (L) 9593
- Joe Pantalone (NDP) 9456
- Tom Pang (PC) 2084
- Paul “No Government” Barker (Lbt) 427
- Andrew Scorer (G) 243
- Glen Magder (F) 186
- Bill Whelan 181
- Ronald Rodgers (Ind [Communist Party of North America]) 154

=== Frontenac—Addington ===
- (incumbent) Larry South (L) 11628
- Bob Lucas (PC) 7407
- Lars Thompson (NDP) 4996
- Ross Baker 667

=== Grey—Owen Sound ===
- Ron Lipsett (L) 14298
- Bill Murdoch (PC) 12364
- Cathy Hird (NDP) 5924
- Tom Clark (FCP) 1946

=== Guelph ===
- (incumbent) Rick Ferraro (L) 18445
- Derek Fletcher (NDP) 9119
- Bob Pierce (PC) 5383
- Craig Sanderson 562

=== Halton Centre ===
Ontario general election, 1987
Party	Candidate	Votes	%	±%
Liberal	Barbara Sullivan	15,833		
Progressive Conservative	Barry Quinn	9,539		
New Democratic	Richard Banigan	4,487		

=== Halton North ===
- Walt Elliot (L) 11644
- Dave Whiting (PC) 6920
- Fern Wolf (NDP) 5796

=== Hamilton Centre ===
- (incumbent) Lily Oddie Munro (L) 13636
- Brian Hinkley (NDP) 10333
- Gerald Fruewith (PC) 2600

=== Hamilton East ===
- (incumbent) Bob Mackenzie (NDP) 16421
- David Bach (L) 9890
- Tommy Tarpos (PC) 1915
- Bob Jaggard (Comm) 673

=== Hamilton Mountain ===
- (incumbent) Brian Charlton (NDP) 14743
- Jane Milanetti (L) 13111
- John Smith (PC) 6580

=== Hamilton West ===
- (incumbent) Richard Allen (NDP) 13430
- Mary Kiss (L) 12336
- Don Ross (PC) 5862

=== Hastings—Peterborough ===
- (incumbent) Jim Pollock (PC) 9910
- Carman Metcalfe (L) 8705
- Elmer Buchanan (NDP) 6579

=== High Park—Swansea ===
- David Fleet (L) 9637
- (incumbent) Yuri Shymko (PC) 8823
- Elaine Ziemba (NDP) 8764
- Bob Cumming (Lbt) 660

=== Huron ===
- (incumbent) Jack Riddell (L) 16099
- Nico Peters (PC) 6725
- Paul Klopp (NDP) 3841

=== Kenora ===
- Frank Miclash (L) 7943
- Doug Miranda (NDP) 6845
- Mark Duggan (PC) 4824

=== Kingston and the Islands ===
- (incumbent) Ken Keyes (L) 13141
- Gary Wilson (NDP) 6402
- Tom Annis (PC) 5910
- Steven Kaasgaard (G) 511

=== Kitchener ===
- (incumbent) David Cooke (L) 15373
- Sue Coulter (NDP) 8379
- Barbara Fraser (PC) 4226
- John Meenan (FCP) 1100
- Ed Halbach (Ind [Humanist]) 290

=== Kitchener—Wilmot ===
- (incumbent) John Sweeney (L) 18151
- Mike Cooper (NDP) 7503
- Dorothy Angel (PC) 5218

=== Lake Nipigon ===
- (incumbent) Gilles Pouliot (NDP) 8446
- Herman Mannila (L) 3606
- Vic Fournel (PC) 1129

=== Lambton ===
- (incumbent) David William Smith (L) 11385
- Bill Steadman (PC) 8826
- Grant Reynolds (NDP) 2914
- Peter Westfall (FCP) 2399

=== Lanark—Renfrew ===
- Douglas Wiseman (PC) 13902
- Bob Pugh (L) 13141
- Don Page (NDP) 5486

=== Lawrence ===
- (incumbent) Joseph Cordiano (L) 15332
- Evelyn Nurialdo (NDP) 8201
- David Perry (PC) 5379

=== Leeds—Grenville ===
- (incumbent) Bob Runciman (PC) 14787
- Jim Jordan (L) 14589
- Geri Sheedy (NDP) 4869

=== Lincoln ===
- Harry Pelissero (L) 12320
- (incumbent) Philip Andrewes (PC) 11284
- Ron Hansen (NDP) 6207

=== London Centre ===
- (incumbent) David Peterson (L) 18194
- Marion Boyd (NDP) 9266
- Dennis McKaig (PC) 3864
- Brenda Rowe (FCP) 695
- Lloyd Walker (F) 589
- Stunning Bentley 375

=== London North ===
- (incumbent) Ron Van Horne (L) 22452
- Diane Whiteside (NDP) 7961
- Lucky Clark (PC) 7177
- Elvin Mizzau (FCP) 611
- Barry Malcolm (F) 537

=== London South ===
- (incumbent) Joan Smith (L) 20046
- Vaughan Minor (PC) 7723
- David Winninger (NDP) 7074
- Paul Picard (FCP) 861
- Robert Metz (F) 430

=== Markham ===
- (incumbent) Don Cousens (PC) 19224
- Gail Newall (L) 18543
- Anne Swarbrick (NDP) 4323
- Rina Puleo (FCP) 1403

=== Middlesex ===
- (incumbent) Doug Reycraft (L) 17600
- Renie Long (PC) 7689
- Michael Wyatt (NDP) 5720
- Bill Giesen (FCP) 2664
- Marc Emery (F) 499

=== Mississauga East ===
- John Sola (L) 16245
- (incumbent) Bud Gregory (PC) 10372
- Sal Manni (NDP) 4864
- Bill Frampton (F) 761

=== Mississauga North ===
- (incumbent) Steve Offer (L) 14604
- John Moszynski (NDP) 6153
- Gabe Spoletine (PC) 5309

=== Mississauga South ===
- (incumbent) Margaret Marland (PC) 13854
- Claudette MacKay-Lassonde (L) 13255
- Barry Stevens (NDP) 4976
- Chris Balabanian (F) 712

=== Mississauga West ===
- Steve Mahoney (L) 23482
- Darwin Kealey (PC) 9138
- Paul Simon (NDP) 6280

=== Muskoka—Georgian Bay ===
1987 Ontario general election: Muskoka—Georgian Bay
Party	Candidate	Votes	%	±%
Liberal	Ken Black	12,645	43.45	–
Progressive Conservative	George Beatty	9,396	32.29	–
New Democratic	Dan Waters	7,059	24.26	–
Total valid votes		29,100	99.06	
Total rejected ballots		276	0.94	–
Turnout		29,376	65.07	–
Eligible voters		45,146		
Liberal notional gain from Progressive Conservative		Swing		–
Source: Elections Ontario

=== Nepean ===
- Hans Daigeler (L) 13951
- (incumbent) Bob Mitchell (PC) 10315
- Larry Jones (NDP) 4526

=== Niagara Falls ===
- (incumbent) Vince Kerrio (L) 13600
- Margaret Harrington (NDP) 7936
- Ed Sherar (PC) 5066

=== Niagara South ===
- (incumbent) Ray Haggerty (L) 11740
- Doug Martin (PC) 4645
- Camilla Gyorffy (NDP) 4396

=== Nickel Belt ===
- (incumbent) Floyd Laughren (NDP) 9849
- Leo Pevato (L) 3863
- Evelyn Dutrisac (PC) 3208

=== Nipissing ===
- (incumbent) Mike Harris (PC) 15744
- Marthe Smith (L) 11690
- Sandra Clifford (NDP) 2961
- Brendan Purtill (FCP) 672

=== Norfolk ===
- (incumbent) Gord Miller (L) 17313
- Norm Jamison (NDP) 8346
- Ian Birnie (PC) 5742

=== Northumberland ===
- Joan Fawcett (L) 14451
- (incumbent) Howard Sheppard (PC) 13075
- Judi Armstrong (NDP) 4372
- Brant Fotheringham (FCP) 836
- Adrian O'Connell (G) 242

=== Oakville South ===
- Doug Carrothers (L) 13241
- (incumbent) Terry O'Connor (PC) 11950
- Tim Cooper (NDP) 3080
- Chris Kowalcuk (G) 1357

=== Oakwood ===
- Chaviva Hošek (L) 11192
- (incumbent) Tony Grande (NDP) 9861
- Irene Paparo-Stein (PC) 1573
- Geoff Da Silva (Comm) 556

=== Oriole ===
- (incumbent) Elinor Caplan (L) 16206
- Fredelle Brief (PC) 5659
- Judy Rebick (NDP) 4470
- George Graham (Lbt) 822

=== Oshawa ===
- (incumbent) Mike Breaugh (NDP) 12957
- Cathy O'Flynn (L) 10041
- Frank Snyder (PC) 4076
- James Delaney (FCP) 1184

=== Ottawa Centre ===
- Richard Patten (L) 13867
- (incumbent) Evelyn Gigantes (NDP) 11780
- Greg Vezina (PC) 3159
- John Turmel 598

=== Ottawa East ===
- (incumbent) Bernard Grandmaitre (L) 18959
- Alex Connely (NDP) 4137
- Corinne Prince (PC) 2435

=== Ottawa—Rideau ===
- Yvonne O'Neill (L) 14179
- Pam Forward (PC) 8068
- Bea Murray (NDP) 6000

=== Ottawa South ===
- Dalton McGuinty, Sr. (L) 15952
- Michael McSweeney (PC) 9365
- Penina Coopersmith (NDP) 6038

=== Ottawa West ===
1987 Ontario general election: Ottawa West
Party	Candidate	Votes	%	±%
Liberal	Bob Chiarelli	16,343	50.46	+12.94
Progressive Conservative	Derek Insley	9,951	30.72	−15.91
New Democratic	Paul Weinzweig	4,403	13.60	−0.08
Family Coalition	Lynn McPherson	1,689	5.21	–
Total valid votes		32,386	100.00	
Total rejected, unmarked and declined ballots		251	0.77	
Turnout		32,637	61.61	
Eligible voters		52,977		
Liberal gain		Swing		

=== Oxford ===
- Charlie Tatham (L) 14939
- (incumbent) Dick Treleaven (PC) 12065
- Wayne Colbran (NDP) 6606
- Margaret De Boer (FCP) 1410
- Kaye Sargent (Lbt) 466

=== Parkdale ===
- (incumbent) Tony Ruprecht (L) 13430
- Vasco Dos Santos (NDP) 3961
- Charles Olito (PC) 798
- Carla Marmelo (FCP) 389
- Danny Hunt (Lbt) 283
- Gordon Massie (Comm) 184
- Camilo Tiqui 176
- Nancy Van Schouwen (Ind [Humanist]) 113

=== Parry Sound ===
- (incumbent) Ernie Eves (PC) 11332
- Rollie Boissonneault (L) 6935
- Bill Pabst (NDP) 2231
- Warren Edgar (FCP) 647

=== Perth ===
- (incumbent) Hugh Edighoffer (L) 18037
- Warren Ham (NDP) 6080
- Ron Christie (PC) 5357

=== Peterborough ===
- Peter Adams (L) 15098
- Linda Slavin (NDP) 10641
- Doris Brick (PC) 8480
- Alex Calder (FCP) 3057
- John Conlin (Lbt) 344

=== Port Arthur ===
- Taras Kozyra (L) 13747
- Chris Southcott (NDP) 11828
- Evelyn Dodds (PC) 4419

=== Prescott and Russell ===
- (incumbent) Jean Poirier (L) 26811
- Yves Deschamps (NDP) 4460
- Roland Demers (PC) 4100

=== Prince Edward—Lennox ===
- Keith MacDonald (L) 11961
- Dennis Tompkins (PC) 9882
- Paul Johnson (NDP) 4724

=== Quinte ===
- (incumbent) Hugh O'Neil (L) 17151
- Doug Brewer (PC) 6543
- Gene Morosan (NDP) 3520
- Allan Bristol (Lbt) 413

=== Rainy River ===
- Howard Hampton (NDP) 5538
- Dan Pierroz (L) 4631
- (incumbent) Jack Pierce (PC) 3487

=== Renfrew North ===
- (incumbent) Sean Conway (L) 18507
- Stu Mark (PC) 5652
- Ish Theilheimer (NDP) 3958
- Shirley Witt (FCP) 1385

=== Riverdale ===
- (incumbent) David Reville (NDP) 10321
- Jim Karygiannis (L) 8562
- Bob Dodd (PC) 3285
- Debra Bojman (G) 330
- Byron Garby (Lbt) 292
- Maggie Bizzell (Comm) 210

=== St. Andrew—St. Patrick ===
- Ron Kanter (L) 14159
- (incumbent) Larry Grossman (PC) 10483
- Gladys Rothman (NDP) 5608
- Alex MacDonald (Lbt) 761

=== St. Catharines ===
Party	Candidate	Votes	%
Liberal	(incumbent) Jim Bradley	17,584	63.30
New Democratic	Rob West	5,566	20.04
Progressive Conservative	Chuck Bradley	4,258	15.33
Communist	Eric Blair	369	1.33
Total valid votes		27,777	100.00

=== St. Catharines—Brock ===
- Mike Dietsch (L) 10822
- (incumbent) Peter Partington (PC) 8821
- Christel Haeck (NDP) 6514

=== St. George—St. David ===
- (incumbent) Ian Scott (L) 15051
- (incumbent) Susan Fish (PC) 7996
- John Campey (NDP) 5658
- Michael Beech (Lbt) 721

=== Sarnia ===
- (incumbent) Andy Brandt (PC) 12964
- Joan Link-Mellon (L) 10303
- Catherine Giles (NDP) 4552
- Terry Burrell (FCP) 1475
- Margaret Coe (Lbt) 559

=== Sault Ste. Marie ===
- (incumbent) Karl Morin-Strom (NDP) 19064
- Albert Ferranti (L) 16381
- Udo Rauk (PC) 3464

=== Scarborough—Agincourt ===
- Gerry Phillips (L) 19101
- David Kho (NDP) 7021
- Adrienne Johnson (PC) 6284
- Barry Coyne (Lbt) 794

=== Scarborough Centre ===
- Cindy Nicholas (L) 11921
- Menno Vorster (NDP) 8525
- (incumbent) Bill Davis (PC) 7217
- Chris Douros (FCP) 827
- Martin Weatherall 550

=== Scarborough East ===
- (incumbent) Ed Fulton (L) 16944
- Mary Cook (NDP) 7048
- Russ Bastow (PC) 5390
- Jim McIntosh (Lbt) 869
- Greg Knittl (G) 337

=== Scarborough—Ellesmere ===
- Frank Faubert (L) 12422
- (incumbent) David Warner (NDP) 11941
- Gail Brewer (PC) 5445

=== Scarborough North ===
- (incumbent) Alvin Curling (L) 20021
- Peter Lam (PC) 5861
- Nick Summers (NDP) 4509
- Louis Di Rocco (FCP) 1371

=== Scarborough West ===
- (incumbent) Richard Johnston (NDP) 13330
- Joe Pacione (L) 10094
- Brian Clark (PC) 3881
- Stephen Jalsevic (FCP) 1035
- George Dance (Lbt) 483

=== Simcoe Centre ===
- Bruce Owen (L) 15474
- (incumbent) Earl Rowe (PC) 12982
- Fred Ruemper (NDP) 7265

=== Simcoe East ===
- (incumbent) Al McLean (PC) 12543
- Butch Orser (L) 11737
- Fayne Bullen (NDP) 9699

=== Simcoe West ===
- (incumbent) George McCague (PC) 11678
- Gary Johnson (L) 11372
- Noel St-Laurent (NDP) 4788

=== Stormont—Dundas—Glengarry and East Grenville ===
- (incumbent) Noble Villeneuve (PC) 10771
- Gerry Rosenquist (L) 10164
- Gordon McGregor 4784
- Arthur Carkner (NDP) 2345

=== Sudbury ===
- Sterling Campbell (L) 12788
- (incumbent) Jim Gordon (PC) 10158
- Sharon Murdock (NDP) 9260
- Ted McKeown 285

=== Sudbury East ===
- Shelley Martel (NDP) 15179
- Claude Mayer (L) 9540
- Gary Peck (PC) 2890

=== Timiskaming ===
- (incumbent) David Ramsay (L) 10218
- Ollie Rivard (NDP) 5871
- Ed Havrot (PC) 4870

=== Victoria—Haliburton ===
- (incumbent) John Eakins (L) 16287
- Arthur Ward (PC) 5856
- Ivan Moore (NDP) 4251
- Diane Roblin-Lee (FCP) 2403

=== Waterloo North ===
- (incumbent) Herbert Epp (L) 16792
- Elizabeth Witmer (PC) 8681
- Richard Hastings (NDP) 5785
- Ian O'Neill (Lbt) 818

=== Welland—Thorold ===
- (incumbent) Mel Swart (NDP) 17490
- Mark Larose (L) 9855
- Giulio Roca (PC) 2167
- Angela Braun (FCP) 706

=== Wellington ===
- (incumbent) Jack Johnson (PC) 10797
- Bill Benson (L) 10334
- Burna Wilton (NDP) 5159

=== Wentworth East ===
- Shirley Collins (L) 16153
- Sharon Lehnert (NDP) 8676
- Barbara Vance (PC) 5577
- Ann Stasiuk 475

=== Wentworth North ===
- (incumbent) Chris Ward (L) 16150
- Gary Tilley (PC) 7107
- Lynn Spencer (NDP) 6641

=== Willowdale ===
- Gino Matrundola (L) 15543
- Charles Harnick (PC) 11509
- Batya Hebdon (NDP) 5774
- Earl Epstein (Lbt) 985

=== Wilson Heights ===
- (incumbent) Monte Kwinter (L) 17007
- Jennifer Paton (NDP) 6697
- David Farb (PC) 5879

=== Windsor—Riverside ===
- (incumbent) Dave Cooke (NDP) 17162
- Rick Limoges (L) 11257
- Terry Hrynyk (PC) 842
- Mark Kahabka (FCP) 509

=== Windsor—Sandwich ===
- (incumbent) Bill Wrye (L) 14888
- George Dadamo (NDP) 12535
- Beth Cooper (PC) 1965

=== Windsor—Walkerville ===
- (incumbent) Mike Ray (L) 14361
- Donna Champagne (NDP) 13415
- Jerry Kovacs (PC) 1553
- Mike Longmoore (Comm) 335

=== York Centre ===
- (incumbent) Greg Sorbara (L) 27096
- Doug Mason (PC) 8605
- Joe Licastro (NDP) 7692

=== York East ===
- (incumbent) Christine Hart (L) 15683
- Peter Oyler (PC) 7352
- Sophia Apostolides (NDP) 7056
- Chris Frazer (Comm) 527

=== York Mills ===
- Brad Nixon (L) 14272
- Gordon Chong (PC) 11955
- Steve Shorter (NDP) 3195
- Joe Kyriakakis (Lbt) 582

=== York—Mackenzie ===
- Charles Beer (L) 14177
- John Cole (PC) 8992
- Susan Wakeling (NDP) 6092

=== York South ===
- (incumbent) Bob Rae (NDP) 13190
- Alan Tonks (L) 12857
- Fred De Francesco (PC) 1544
- Dusan Kubias (Lbt) 411

=== Yorkview ===
- (incumbent) Claudio Polsinelli (L) 11499
- Sheila Lambrinos (NDP) 6148
- Tony Marzilli (Ind [Trudeau Liberal]) 2507
- Fareed Khan (PC) 1037
- Russ Jackman (Lbt) 674

== Byelections after 1987 ==
- March 31, 1988: London North, following the December 31, 1987 resignation of Ron Van Horne:

Dianne Cunningham (PC) 13858
Elaine Pensa (L) 10356
Diane Whiteside (NDP) 6799
Brenda Rowe (FCP) 1419
Barry Malcolm (F) 548
John Turmel 115

- November 3, 1988: Welland—Thorold, following the October 24, 1988 resignation of Mel Swart:

Peter Kormos (NDP) 13933
Mike Lottridge (L) 9819
Brian O'Brine (PC) 4574
Barry Fitzgerald (F) 260
John Turmel 187

Dalton McGuinty, Sr., MPP for Ottawa South, died on March 16, 1990. No byelection was held; the seat was vacant until the 1990 election in September.

== See also ==
- Politics of Ontario
- List of Ontario political parties
- Premier of Ontario
- Leader of the Opposition (Ontario)
- Independent candidates, 1987 Ontario provincial election
- Progressive Conservative Party of Ontario candidates in the 1987 Ontario provincial election
