= Tom Froese =

Canadian politician

Ontario MPP
- In office 1995–1999
- Preceded by: Christel Haeck
- Succeeded by: Riding abolished
- Constituency: St. Catharines—Brock

Personal details
- Born: November 29, 1952 (age 73) Niagara-on-the-Lake, Ontario
- Party: Progressive Conservative
- Relations: Jake Froese (father)
- Occupation: Businessman

Tom Froese (born November 29, 1952) is a former politician in Ontario, Canada. He served as a Progressive Conservative member of the Legislative Assembly of Ontario from 1995 to 1999 who represented the riding of St. Catharines—Brock.

== Background ==
Froese was born in Niagara-on-the-Lake, Ontario, where his father Jake Froese would later serve as the town's mayor and as a federal Member of Parliament. He worked at Niagara Credit Union from 1971 to 1995, and served in several other local organizations. In 1991, he was named as Niagara-on-the-Lake citizen of the year.

== Politics ==
Froese was elected to the Ontario legislature in the 1995 provincial election, defeating Liberal Gail Richardson and New Democrat incumbent Christel Haeck by a plurality of about 4,500 votes in the riding of St. Catharines—Brock. He served as a backbench supporter of Mike Harris's government for the next four years.

In 1996, the Harris government reduced the number of provincial ridings from 130 to 103. This change meant that a number of sitting MPPs had to compete against one another for re-election in the 1999 campaign. Froese ran against veteran Liberal MPP Jim Bradley in the new riding of St. Catharines, and lost by over 7,000 votes.
