= Chris Stockwell =

Canadian politician

The Honourable Chris Stockwell ECO

36th Speaker of the Legislative Assembly of Ontario
- In office October 3, 1996 – October 19, 1999
- Preceded by: Al McLean
- Succeeded by: Gary Carr

Member of Provincial Parliament for Ontario
- In office 1999–2003
- Preceded by: New riding
- Succeeded by: Donna Cansfield
- Constituency: Etobicoke Centre
- In office 1990–1999
- Preceded by: Linda LeBourdais
- Succeeded by: Riding abolished
- Constituency: Etobicoke West

Personal details
- Born: March 9, 1957 London, Ontario, Canada
- Died: February 10, 2018 (aged 60) Toronto, Ontario, Canada
- Party: Progressive Conservative
- Children: 2
- Occupation: Political consultant

Chris Stockwell (March 9, 1957 – February 10, 2018) was a Canadian politician from Ontario. He was a Progressive Conservative member of the Legislative Assembly of Ontario from 1990 to 2003, and served as Speaker of the legislature and cabinet minister in the governments of Mike Harris and Ernie Eves. Before entering provincial politics, he had been a member of Etobicoke City Council and the Metro Toronto Council.

== Early life ==
Stockwell was born March 9, 1957, in London, Ontario to Bill and Loretta Stockwell, the second of five children.

== Politics ==
=== Municipal ===
Stockwell was elected as a city of Etobicoke Controller in 1982, was defeated in his attempt at re-election in 1985, but was elected to the Metropolitan Toronto council in November 1988 representing Lakeshore-Queensway, in the Etobicoke region, and also served as chair of the Metro O'Keefe Centre for the Performing Arts during this period.

=== Provincial ===
Stockwell was elected to the Ontario provincial legislature in the 1990 provincial election, defeating incumbent Liberal Linda LeBourdais by about 4,000 votes in Etobicoke West. The New Democratic Party won the election, and Stockwell sat on the opposition benches for the next five years.

The Tories won a majority in the provincial election of 1995, and Stockwell was easily elected in his own riding. Despite his experience, he was not appointed to cabinet by the new Premier, Mike Harris. He soon developed a reputation as one of the more prominent Red Tories in the Tory caucus.

Stockwell was elected Speaker of the Assembly on October 3, 1996. He was not Harris's preferred choice for the position, but won with support from members in all three parties. Stockwell won a reputation for independence in the Speaker's chair, and was not afraid to criticize members of his own party.

Stockwell played a key role in the anti-megacity filibuster of 1997, where the Opposition parties proposed thousands of amendments identical except for a few words. He ruled against the government when they moved that the legislature did not need to vote on each amendment, but in their favor when they suggested that the identical text did not need to be read aloud each time.

In the provincial election of 1999, Stockwell's personal popularity was such that he was able to win an easy re-election in the redistributed riding of Etobicoke Centre after defeating fellow MPP Doug Ford, Sr. for then Progressive Conservative nomination. On June 17, 1999, he was appointed to cabinet as Minister of Labour.

Despite Stockwell's reputation as a Red Tory, he implemented a number of right-wing policy directives as Labour Minister. He was largely credited with shepherding through the legislature a bill to increase the maximum work-week to 60 hours, and also promoted the Harris government's "Workplace Democracy Act", which made union organization more difficult. In addition to the Labour portfolio, Stockwell also served as Commissioner of the Board of Internal Economy for a few months in 2001.

Stockwell was a candidate to succeed Mike Harris in the 2002 PC leadership campaign. During this campaign, he claimed that the right-wing initiatives of Harris's "Common Sense Revolution" were necessary in 1995, but no longer made sense in 2003. He placed last with four per cent of the vote and was eliminated on the first ballot.

On April 15, 2002, Eves appointed Stockwell as Government House Leader and Minister of Environment and Energy. The Energy and Environment portfolios were broken up on August 22, 2002, with Stockwell keeping Environment.

On June 17, 2003, he resigned from cabinet in the wake of a controversy concerning the misuse of expenses. All expenses were referred to the provincial Integrity Commissioner who at that time was the Honourable Coulter A. Osbourne, a former Ontario Supreme Court judge. He undertook an exhaustive review. In his first report dated January 31, 2003, covering the period from June 26, 1995, to December 31, 2002, the Honourable Coulter A. Osbourne concluded: "I am satisfied that the expenses which I have reviewed, net of reimbursements made, are allowable expenses (see section 15 of the Act)." On June 9, 2003, he stated: "I am pleased to report that all expense claims made for the period January 1st to March 31st met with the requirements of the Act and the Rules Governing the Expenses of Cabinet Ministers, Opposition Leaders and other persons." On June 3, 2004, covering the period April 3, 2003 to March 31, 2004, the Commissioner again stated: "I am pleased to report that all requests for reimbursements were complied with and all expense claims reviewed were subsequently approved."

On July 25, 2003, Stockwell announced that he would not run in the 2003 election. He was later employed as a political consultant.

=== Attempted return to Toronto City Council ===
In 2013, Stockwell was one of several candidates for appointment to Toronto City Council to replace Doug Holyday in Ward 3. The Etobicoke Community Council recommended him to the city council as its preferred candidate for the appointment; however, on October 10, 2013, the final city council vote selected Peter Leon. In September 2014, Stockwell registered as a candidate for Toronto City Council in Ward 4 in Etobicoke. He came in fourth place, with 9.2% of the vote, losing to John Campbell.

== Death ==
Stockwell died of cancer in Toronto on February 10, 2018, at the age of 60.

== Cabinet positions ==
Eves ministry, Province of Ontario (2002–2003)
Cabinet posts (2)
Predecessor	Office	Successor
Ministry re-established	Minister of Environment; August 22, 2002 – June 17, 2003	Jim Wilson
Elizabeth Witmer (Environment); Jim Wilson (Energy)	Minister of Environment and Energy; April 15, 2002 – August 22, 2002	John Baird (Energy)
Special Parliamentary Responsibilities
Predecessor	Title	Successor
Janet Ecker	Government House Leader; 2002–2003	John Baird
Harris ministry, Province of Ontario (1995–2002)
Cabinet post (1)
Predecessor	Office	Successor
Jim Flaherty	Minister of Labour; 1999–2002	Brad Clark

== Electoral record (partial) ==
=== Ward 4 - Etobicoke Centre (October 27, 2014) ===
Ward 4
Candidate	Votes	%
John Campbell	8,227	34.44
Niels Christensen	6,847	28.66
Angelo Carnevale	4,968	20.79
Chris Stockwell	2,208	9.24
Adam Slobodian	384	1.60
Tony Chun	286	1.19
William Murdoch	278	1.16
Rosemarie Mulhall	267	1.11
Mario Magno	216	0.90
Oscar Vidal-Calvet	205	0.85
Total	23,886	100

1999 Ontario general election: Etobicoke Centre
Party	Candidate	Votes	%	Expenditures
Progressive Conservative	Chris Stockwell	25,518	54.12	$49,034
Liberal	Agnes Ugolini Potts	19,035	40.37	$41,081
New Democratic	Bonte Minnema	1,309	2.78	$1,896
Family Coalition	Dan McCash	389	0.83	$31
Green	Christopher J. Morton	375	0.80	none listed
Natural Law	Geraldine Jackson	316	0.67	$0
Independent	Elaine Couto	209	0.44	$26
Total valid votes		47,151	99.13	
Total rejected, unmarked and declined ballots		414	0.87	
Turnout		47,565	64.55	
Eligible voters		73,691		
Progressive Conservative pickup new district.				
Source: Elections Ontario

1995 Ontario general election: Etobicoke West
Party	Candidate	Votes	%	±%
Progressive Conservative	Chris Stockwell	18,349	55.30	+14.74
Liberal	Michael Brown	9,826	29.61	–0.21
New Democratic	Judy Jones	4,608	13.89	–9.75
Natural Law	Laureen G. Amos	399	1.20	–
Total valid votes		33,182	99.35	
Total rejected, unmarked and declined ballots		217	0.65	–0.48
Turnout		33,399	70.68	+0.81
Eligible voters		47,256		
Progressive Conservative hold		Swing		+7.47
Source: Elections Ontario

1990 Ontario general election: Etobicoke West
Party	Candidate	Votes	%	±%
Progressive Conservative	Chris Stockwell	13,713	40.56	+11.79
Liberal	Linda LeBourdais	10,082	29.82	–17.08
New Democratic	Judy Jones	7,992	23.64	+6.42
Family Coalition	Kevin McGourty	1,045	3.09	–2.54
Green	Geoffrey S. Lepper	354	1.05	–
Libertarian	Janice E. Hazlett	320	0.95	–0.54
Independent	Martin J. M. Fraser	304	0.90	–
Total valid votes		33,810	98.87	
Total rejected, unmarked and declined ballots		385	1.13	+0.47
Turnout		34,195	69.86	+3.98
Eligible voters		48,945		
Progressive Conservative gain from Liberal		Swing		+14.43
Source: Elections Ontario

=== Metropolitan Toronto Council, 1988 ===
Lakeshore Queensway
Chris Stockwell - 10,442
Morley Kells - 7,790

=== Toronto municipal election, 1985 ===
Etobicoke Board of Control, 1985 (4 elected)
Candidate	Votes
Dick O'Brien (incumbent)	34,248
Lois Griffin	33,175
Leonard Braithwaite (incumbent)	33,085
Morley Kells	29,817
Chris Stockwell (incumbent)	29,629
Doug Holyday	28,982
James Shawera	5,473
