= Christel Haeck =

Canadian politician

Ontario MPP
- In office 1990–1995
- Preceded by: Mike Dietsch
- Succeeded by: Tom Froese
- Constituency: St. Catharines—Brock

Personal details
- Born: March 9, 1948 (age 78) Stuttgart, Germany
- Party: New Democrat
- Spouse: Dennis Gannon
- Occupation: Librarian

Christel Haeck (Note: First name spelled as Christel, Cristel or Crystal in media sources.) (born March 9, 1948) is a former politician in Ontario, Canada. She was a New Democratic Party member of the Legislative Assembly of Ontario from 1990 to 1995 who represented the riding of St. Catharines—Brock.

== Background ==
Haeck was educated at Trent University in Peterborough and the SUNY Buffalo School of Information and Library Science. She worked as a library assistant at the Fort Erie Public Library in Fort Erie, Ontario from 1974 to 1977, and then took up a position as a librarian for St. Catharines Public Library. She was later appointed Head of Special Collections for the St. Catharines Public Library, leaving that position in January 1990 after her marriage to Dennis Gannon of Arlington, VA. Haeck graduated from the Niagara College program, Library Computer Network Operator in June 1996. She is a member of the Ontario Library Association.

She has served on several community and regional boards including the Labour Advisory Committee for Niagara College of Applied Arts and Technology, Heritage Niagara, and the Ecological and Environmental Advisory Committee of the Regional Municipality of Niagara.

== Provincial politics ==
She ran for the Ontario legislature in the 1987 provincial election, but finished third against Liberal Mike Dietsch in the riding of St. Catharines—Brock. She ran a second time in the 1990 provincial election and defeated Dietsch by 1,159 votes, The NDP formed a majority government and Haeck was appointed as a parliamentary assistant to the Minister of Colleges and Universities from October 1990 to August 1991. She also served as a member of the caucus executive. Haeck chaired the Standing Committee on Regulations and Private Bills for two years.

In 1991, Haeck introduced a private member's bill called the Public Sector Food Services Act. It called for schools, hospitals and other provincial institutions to buy only Ontario grown produce. She said the bill "would require public service facilities in which prepared foods are provided to use only food grown or wholly manufactured in Ontario." Critics said the proposed bill was against federal efforts to reduce provincial trade barriers. The bill made it to second reading.

The NDP were defeated in the 1995 provincial election, and Haeck finished third against Progressive Conservative Tom Froese in her bid for re-election.

When Bob Rae stepped down as party leader she supported Howard Hampton for leader of the party.

== Regional politics ==
Haeck participated in municipal electoral politics in 1997, coming a close third. A recount was initiated by Haeck where a judicial recount established her standing.

In 2000, Haeck campaigned to be a part of the six-member St. Catharines delegation to the Niagara Regional Council and finished seventh. She was appointed to the council in 2002, following the death of former mayor Roy Adams. She ran again in the 2003 municipal election, but finished tenth.

She has been awarded a lifetime membership in the NDP.
