= Doug Holyday =

Canadian politician

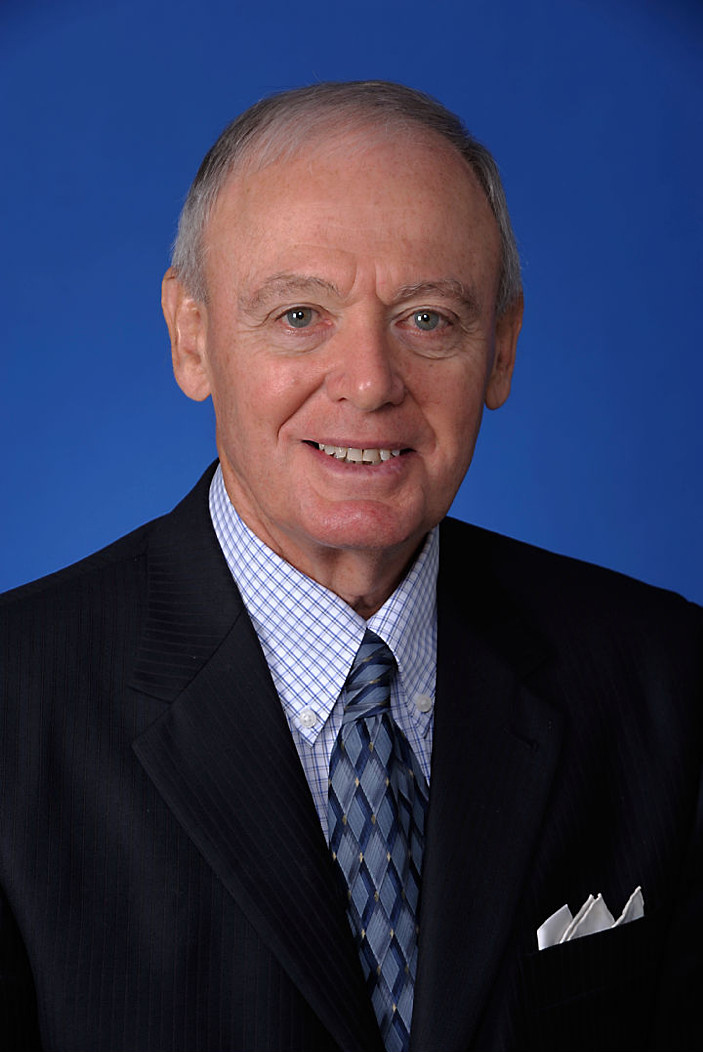
- Holyday in 2010

Member of the Ontario Provincial Parliament for Etobicoke—Lakeshore
- In office September 9, 2013 – June 23, 2014
- Preceded by: Laurel Broten
- Succeeded by: Peter Milczyn

Deputy Mayor of Toronto
- In office December 1, 2010 – August 21, 2013
- Preceded by: Joe Pantalone
- Succeeded by: Norm Kelly

Toronto City Councillor for Ward 3 (Etobicoke Centre)
- In office December 1, 2000 – August 21, 2013
- Preceded by: New Ward
- Succeeded by: Peter Leon

Toronto City Councillor for Ward 4 (Markland Centennial)
- In office January 1, 1998 – December 1, 2000
- Preceded by: New Ward
- Succeeded by: Ward Abolished

Mayor of Etobicoke
- In office December 1, 1994 – January 1, 1998
- Preceded by: Bruce Sinclair
- Succeeded by: City Amalgamated

Chair of the Audit Committee
- In office June 27, 2005 – August 21, 2013
- Preceded by: Bas Balkissoon
- Succeeded by: To Be Determined

Personal details
- Born: Douglas Charles Holyday; 1942 (age 83–84)
- Party: Progressive Conservative
- Spouse: Franca
- Children: Stephen Holyday; David Holyday
- Occupation: Businessman

Douglas Charles Holyday (born 1942) is a retired Canadian politician who served as the last mayor of Etobicoke from 1994 to 1998 and the deputy mayor of Toronto from 2010 to 2013. Holyday was first elected to Etobicoke City Council as an alderman in 1982. After his term as mayor, he was elected to Toronto City Council, where he served until 2013, when he was elected as a member of Provincial Parliament (MPP).

== Political career ==
An insurance broker by profession, Holyday was first elected to Etobicoke City Council as an alderman in 1982. He was defeated in his bid for the Etobicoke Board of Control in the 1985 municipal election but returned as an Etobicoke city councillor, representing Ward 6, from, 1988 until 1994 when he was elected Mayor. He also served as a member of the Metropolitan Toronto Council from 1994 until 1997.

He was the last mayor of the former city of Etobicoke, defeating incumbent Bruce Sinclair in the 1994 municipal election. After a garbage strike in 1995, Holyday and Etobicoke council tendered the garbage collection contract, and inviting CUPE and private operations to bid. Holyday noted that "[CUPE's] price was nowhere near what the private sector offered us", and noted that the contractor did the job with 35 employees as opposed to the previous 71. The move saved Etobicoke $1 million annual at the time, with city officials estimating it at $2 million in 2009, plus private contractors had to post a performance bond and commit to a wage rate for the duration of a five-year contract, which protected the city from a strike. In 1996, Etobicoke also bought out its employees' accumulated sick plan, with new employees not eligible for sick day accumulation.

Etobicoke was the only area in Toronto not affected by the 2009 garbage strike, with the sick day accumulation plan being one of the unresolved issues between the city and CUPE. Holyday also pointed out that 90 per cent of Canadian municipalities contract out garbage collection, with Oshawa being the only GTA municipality where garbage pickup is done by the city.

Etobicoke was amalgamated into Toronto with the 1997 election. With the position of Mayor of Etobicoke abolished, Holyday ran and was elected to the new Toronto City Council representing Ward 4 (Markland Centennial). With redistribution, Holyday was elected to the new Ward 3 in 1999 which he continued to represent until stepping down from council in 2013

One of Toronto council's staunchest conservatives, he is noted for his fiscal conservatism and tendency to oppose public spending measures. For example, in 2008 Holyday proposed that taxpayers' money could be saved if Toronto city councillors reduced their office expenses, kept better track of business mileage, adopted more frugal newsletters, stopped donating to community groups and sports teams in their wards, and had to justify restaurant meals. In addition to his fiscal conservatism, Holyday has also supported conservative policies in other fields. For example, he opposed banning gun clubs in Toronto, as well as a decision by council to ban the Toronto Sportsmen’s Show from the CNE (council later reversed its decision). He has proposed removing the homeless from Nathan Phillips Square, and was the only member of council not to vote for a resolution describing homelessness as a national disaster. He once criticized plans to close certain streets in downtown Toronto for a "car-free day", saying that that would have a negative impact on businesses. Holyday also supported reducing the number of councillors, and voted against childcare subsidies. In 2012, Holyday proposed that casino lobbyists be banned from city hall, stating "I think the fairest way to do it is to take that part out of the equation".

Voters gave Holyday a clear majority in the 2003, 2006, and 2010 municipal elections, and no serious opponents came forward to challenge him.

=== Provincial politics ===
In 1987, Holyday ran for the Legislative Assembly of Ontario as a Progressive Conservative candidate in the 1987 provincial election, but lost to Liberal Linda LeBourdais by over 6,000 votes. He was asked to run for the Tories in the 2003 provincial election, but declined.

In July 2013, Holyday again ran as a Progressive Conservative candidate in the August 1, 2013 by-election to replace retiring Liberal Laurel Broten in the riding of Etobicoke—Lakeshore. Although he once argued that councillors who run for higher office should immediately resign from council, he instead elected to take a leave of absence without pay. On election day, he defeated the Ontario Liberal Party's candidate, fellow councillor Peter Milczyn.

On September 10, 2013 PC Leader Tim Hudak named Holyday as Tory Accountability critic.

He was defeated by Peter Milczyn in the Ontario general election of 2014.

== Personal life ==
Holyday has lived his entire life in Etobicoke, and was an insurance broker before entering political life. Doug Holyday Received the Key to the City of Toronto on 20 August 2013 from Mayor Rob Ford.

== Election results ==
2014 Ontario general election: Etobicoke—Lakeshore
Party	Candidate	Votes	%	±%
Liberal	Peter Milczyn	24,311	47.49	+5.19
Progressive Conservative	Doug Holyday	17,587	34.35	–12.40
New Democratic	P. C. Choo	6,362	12.43	+5.02
Green	Angela Salewsky	2,064	4.03	+1.78
Libertarian	Mark Wrzesniewski	336	0.66	+0.21
Socialist	Natalie Lochwin	236	0.46	–
Freedom	Jeff Merklinger	189	0.37	+0.24
Moderate	Ian Lytvyn	108	0.21	–
Total valid votes		51,193	98.94	
Total rejected, unmarked and declined ballots		548	1.06	+0.44
Turnout		51,741	53.73	+15.77
Eligible voters		96,304		
Liberal gain from Progressive Conservative		Swing		+8.80
Source: Elections Ontario

Ontario provincial by-election, August 1, 2013: Etobicoke—Lakeshore Resignation of Laurel Broten
Party	Candidate	Votes	%	±%
Progressive Conservative	Doug Holyday	16,034	46.75	+17.51
Liberal	Peter Milczyn	14,506	42.30	–8.73
New Democratic	P. C. Choo	2,542	7.41	–8.04
Green	Angela Salewsky	771	2.25	–0.43
Special Needs	Dan King	157	0.46	–
Libertarian	Hans Kunov	152	0.44	+0.05
People's Political Party	Kevin Clarke	87	0.25	–
Freedom	Wayne Simmons	46	0.13	–0.27
Total valid votes		34,295	99.38	
Total rejected, unmarked and declined ballots		214	0.62	+0.04
Turnout		34,509	37.95	–12.06
Eligible voters		90,927		
Progressive Conservative gain from Liberal		Swing		+13.12
Source: Elections Ontario Police detective Steve Ryan had originally been nominated by the Progressive Conservatives, however, according to party leader Tim Hudak, Ryan was unable to run in the by-election due to injuries sustained in a work related automobile accident; city councillor Doug Holyday was recruited to be the party's candidate instead.

2010 Toronto election, Ward 3
Candidate	Votes	%
Doug Holyday	13,521	71.9
Peter Kudryk	2,684	14.3
Ross Vaughan	1,585	8.4
Roger Deschenes	1,010	5.4
Total	18,800	100

2006 Toronto election, Ward 3
Candidate	Votes	%
Doug Holyday	9,757	69.8
Peter Kudryk	2,172	15.5
Lillian Lança	1,391	9.9
Ross Vaughan	669	4.8

2003 Toronto election, Ward 3
Candidate	Votes	%
Doug Holyday	12,207	70.80
Ross Vaughan	2,565	14.87
Maurice Ferraro	1,336	7.74
Amber Saeed	1,133	6.57

2000 Toronto election, Ward 3
Candidate	Votes	%
Doug Holyday	12,639	83.8
Nicholas Florio	2,491	16.4

1997 Toronto election, Ward 4 (Markland Centennial
Candidate	Votes	%
Doug Holyday	15,430	31.96
Dick O'Brien	10,410	21.57
Agnes Ugolini Potts	9,650	20.00
Brian Flynn	6,809	14.11
Steve Deighton	3,974	8.23
Helen Bodanis	799	1.65
Mark Stanisz	507	1.10
Daphne Gabriel	413	0.85
Alexander P. Masur	279	0.57
Total	48,271	100

1994 Etobicoke election, Mayor
Candidate	Votes	%
Doug Holyday	31,045	41.8
Bruce Sinclair (incumbent)	29,687	40.0
Norm Matusiak	10,508	14.1
Tom Hollinshead	1,910	2.5
Herman Jardine	1,146	1.5

1991 Etobicoke election, Ward 6
Candidate	Votes	%
Doug Holyday	acclaimed	100.0

1988 Etobicoke election, Ward 6
Candidate	Votes	%
Doug Holyday	3,801	54.43
Ron Barr	1,358	19.45
John Woodroof	1,314	19.81
Tom Ferguson	509	7.29
Total	6,982	100

1987 Ontario general election: Etobicoke West
Party	Candidate	Votes	%
Liberal	Linda LeBourdais	15,754	46.90
Progressive Conservative	Doug Holyday	9,664	28.77
New Democratic	Phil Jones	5,784	17.22
Family Coalition	Judy Johnson	1,890	5.63
Libertarian	Robert (Bob) Dunk	498	1.48
Total valid votes		33,590	99.34
Total rejected ballots		222	0.66
Turnout		33,812	65.89
Eligible voters		51,319	
Liberal pickup new district.			
Source: Elections Ontario

1985 Etobicoke election, Board of Control (4 elected)
Candidate	Votes
Dick O'Brien (incumbent)	34,248
Lois Griffin	33,175
Leonard Braithwaite (incumbent)	33,085
Morley Kells	29,817
Chris Stockwell (incumbent)	29,629
Doug Holyday	28,982
James Shawera	5,473
