= St. Catharines—Brock =

Former provincial electoral district in Ontario, Canada

St. Catharines-Brock
Ontario electoral district
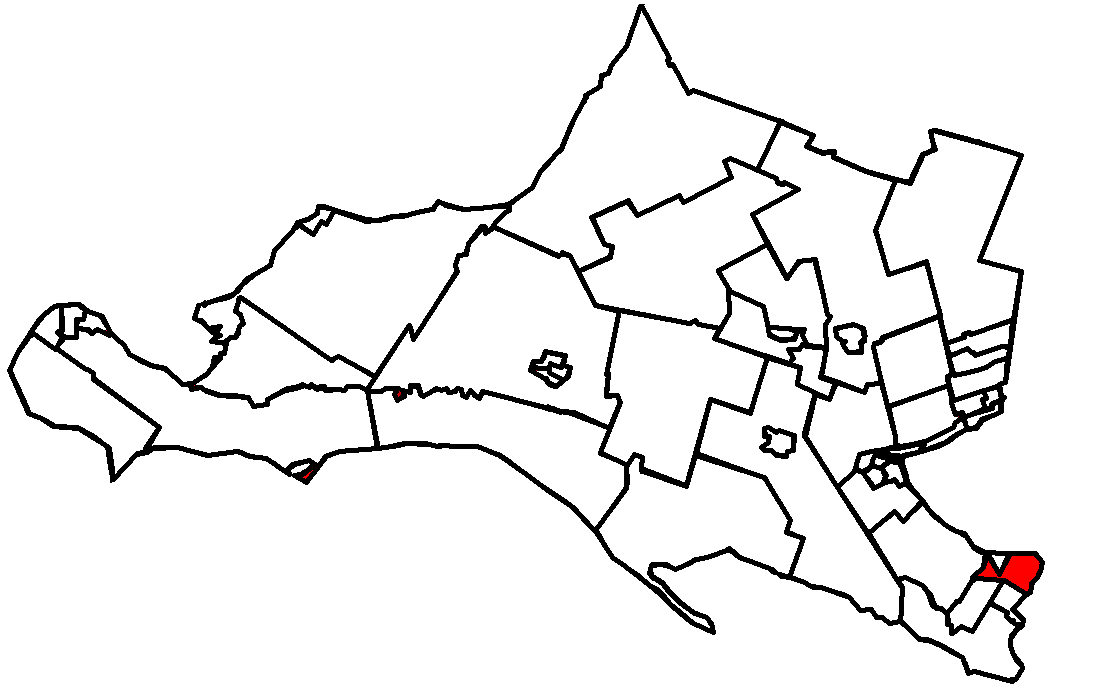
- St. Catharines-Brock in relation to southern Ontario ridings, 1995

Defunct provincial electoral district
- Legislature: Legislative Assembly of Ontario
- First contested: 1975
- Last contested: 1995

Demographics
- Census division: Niagara
- Census subdivision(s): St. Catharines, Niagara-on-the-Lake

St. Catharines—Brock was a provincial electoral district in Ontario, Canada, containing the town of Niagara-on-the-Lake as well as the southern portion of the city of St. Catharines. It was created prior to the 1975 provincial election, and was abolished in 1999 when Ontario adjusted all of its provincial electoral divisions to match those at the federal level. With the riding being merged into the ridings of St. Catharines, Niagara Falls, and Niagara Centre.

== Members of Provincial Parliament ==
St. Catharines—Brock
Assembly	Years	Member	Party
Brock (1975-1987)
30th	1975–1977	Bob Welch	Progressive Conservative
31st	1977–1981	Bob Welch	Progressive Conservative
32nd	1981–1985	Bob Welch	Progressive Conservative
33rd	1985–1987	Peter Partington	Progressive Conservative
St. Catharines—Brock
34th	1987–1990	Mike Dietsch	Liberal
35th	1990–1995	Christel Haeck	New Democratic
36th	1995–1999	Tom Froese	Progressive Conservative
Riding dissolved into St. Catharines, Niagara Falls, and Niagara Centre

== Provincial election results ==
1995 Ontario general election
Party	Candidate	Votes	%	±%
Progressive Conservative	Tom Froese	11,976	47.02	+21.66
Liberal	Gail Richardson	7,373	28.95	–1.54
New Democratic	Christel Haeck	5,521	21.68	–13.03
Family Coalition	Bert C. Pynenburg	598	2.35	–0.83
Total valid votes		25,468	99.19	
Total rejected, unmarked and declined ballots		209	0.81	–0.11
Turnout		25,677	62.56	–3.29
Eligible voters		41,047		
Progressive Conservative gain from New Democratic		Swing		+17.35
Source: Elections Ontario

1990 Ontario general election
Party	Candidate	Votes	%	±%
New Democratic	Christel Haeck	9,538	34.71	+9.81
Liberal	Mike Dietsch	8,379	30.49	–10.88
Progressive Conservative	Rob Welch	6,969	25.36	–8.36
Confederation of Regions	Rodney Book	1,449	5.27	–
Family Coalition	Ed Klassen	873	3.18	–
Libertarian	Conrad Gibbons	270	0.98	–
Total valid votes		27,478	99.08	
Total rejected, unmarked and declined ballots		256	0.92	+0.35
Turnout		27,734	65.85	+2.53
Eligible voters		42,119		
New Democratic gain from Liberal		Swing		+9.08
Source: Elections Ontario

1987 Ontario general election
Party	Candidate	Votes	%	±%
Liberal	Mike Dietsch	10,822	41.37	+2.64
Progressive Conservative	Peter Partington	8,821	33.72	–7.83
New Democratic	Christel Haeck	6,514	24.90	+8.41
Total valid votes		26,157	99.42	
Total rejected ballots		152	0.58	–
Turnout		26,309	63.32	–
Eligible voters		41,552		
Liberal notional gain from Progressive Conservative		Swing		+5.24
Source: Elections Ontario

=== Brock (1975–1987) ===
1985 Ontario general election: Brock
Party	Candidate	Votes	%	±%
Progressive Conservative	Peter Partington	9,741	41.55	–7.20
Liberal	Bill Andres	9,081	38.73	+6.92
New Democratic	Robert Woolston	3,867	16.49	–2.94
Green	Brian Dolby	755	3.22	–
Total valid votes		23,444	99.57	
Total rejected ballots		101	0.43	+0.12
Turnout		23,545	63.04	+2.76
Eligible voters		37,352		
Progressive Conservative hold		Swing		–7.06
Source: Elections Ontario

1981 Ontario general election: Brock
Party	Candidate	Votes	%	±%
Progressive Conservative	Bob Welch	10,547	48.75	–3.02
Liberal	Bill Andres	6,882	31.81	+6.19
New Democratic	Heather Lee Kilty	4,204	19.43	–3.17
Total valid votes		21,633	99.70	
Total rejected ballots		66	0.30	–0.24
Turnout		21,699	60.27	–5.35
Eligible voters		36,001		
Progressive Conservative hold		Swing		–4.61
Source: Elections Ontario

1977 Ontario general election: Brock
Party	Candidate	Votes	%	±%
Progressive Conservative	Bob Welch	11,944	51.78	+3.47
Liberal	Marv Edwards	5,910	25.62	–0.39
New Democratic	Robert Hoover	5,215	22.61	–3.07
Total valid votes		23,069	99.45	
Total rejected ballots		127	0.55	+0.07
Turnout		23,196	65.63	+0.05
Eligible voters		35,346		
Progressive Conservative hold		Swing		+1.93
Source: Elections Ontario

1975 Ontario general election: Brock
Party	Candidate	Votes	%
Progressive Conservative	Bob Welch	10,978	48.31
Liberal	Margo Pyfe	5,911	26.01
New Democratic	Fred Lindal	5,836	25.68
Total valid votes		22,725	99.53
Total rejected ballots		108	0.47
Turnout		22,833	65.58
Eligible voters		34,818	
Progressive Conservative pickup new district.			
Source: Elections Ontario

== See also ==
- List of Ontario provincial electoral districts
- Canadian provincial electoral districts
