= Etobicoke West =

Former provincial electoral district in Ontario, Canada

Ontario electoral district

Defunct provincial electoral district
- Legislature: Legislative Assembly of Ontario
- District created: 1987
- District abolished: 1996
- First contested: 1987
- Last contested: 1995

Demographics
- Census division: Toronto
- Census subdivision: Toronto

Etobicoke West was a provincial electoral district in Ontario, Canada. It was created prior to the 1987 provincial election and eliminated in 1996, when its territory was incorporated into the riding of Etobicoke Centre. Etobicoke West riding was created from the central part of York West. It was in the former borough of Etobicoke.

Two Members of Provincial Parliament represented the riding during its history. The most notable was Chris Stockwell who served in cabinet during the Mike Harris/Ernie Eve governments.

== Members of Provincial Parliament ==
Etobicoke West
Assembly	Years	Member	Party
Created from York West in 1987
34th	1987–1990	Linda LeBourdais	Liberal
35th	1990–1995	Chris Stockwell	Progressive Conservative
36th	1995–1999	Chris Stockwell	Progressive Conservative
Sourced from the Ontario Legislative Assembly
Merged into Etobicoke Centre after 1996

== Electoral results ==
1995 Ontario general election
Party	Candidate	Votes	%	±%
Progressive Conservative	Chris Stockwell	18,349	55.30	+14.74
Liberal	Michael Brown	9,826	29.61	–0.21
New Democratic	Judy Jones	4,608	13.89	–9.75
Natural Law	Laureen G. Amos	399	1.20	–
Total valid votes		33,182	99.35	
Total rejected, unmarked and declined ballots		217	0.65	–0.48
Turnout		33,399	70.68	+0.81
Eligible voters		47,256		
Progressive Conservative hold		Swing		+7.47
Source: Elections Ontario

1990 Ontario general election
Party	Candidate	Votes	%	±%
Progressive Conservative	Chris Stockwell	13,713	40.56	+11.79
Liberal	Linda LeBourdais	10,082	29.82	–17.08
New Democratic	Judy Jones	7,992	23.64	+6.42
Family Coalition	Kevin McGourty	1,045	3.09	–2.54
Green	Geoffrey S. Lepper	354	1.05	–
Libertarian	Janice E. Hazlett	320	0.95	–0.54
Independent	Martin J. M. Fraser	304	0.90	–
Total valid votes		33,810	98.87	
Total rejected, unmarked and declined ballots		385	1.13	+0.47
Turnout		34,195	69.86	+3.98
Eligible voters		48,945		
Progressive Conservative gain from Liberal		Swing		+14.43
Source: Elections Ontario

1987 Ontario general election
Party	Candidate	Votes	%
Liberal	Linda LeBourdais	15,754	46.90
Progressive Conservative	Doug Holyday	9,664	28.77
New Democratic	Phil Jones	5,784	17.22
Family Coalition	Judy Johnson	1,890	5.63
Libertarian	Robert (Bob) Dunk	498	1.48
Total valid votes		33,590	99.34
Total rejected ballots		222	0.66
Turnout		33,812	65.89
Eligible voters		51,319	
Liberal pickup new district.			
Source: Elections Ontario

== See also ==
- List of Ontario provincial electoral districts
- Canadian provincial electoral districts
