= Jim Wiseman =

Canadian politician

Ontario MPP
- In office 1990–1995
- Preceded by: Norah Stoner
- Succeeded by: Janet Ecker
- Constituency: Durham West

Personal details
- Born: April 21, 1949 (age 76) Toronto, Ontario, Canada
- Party: New Democrat
- Occupation: High school teacher

James Perry Wiseman (born April 21, 1949) is a former Canadian politician in Ontario. He was a New Democratic Party member of the Legislative Assembly of Ontario from 1990 to 1995.

== Background ==
Wiseman has a Bachelor of Arts degree from the University of Toronto and a Master of Arts degree from McMaster University. He worked as a high school history teacher before entering political life. His son, Evan, ran for the NDP in the 2011 election in the riding of Ajax—Pickering. He was active in the environmental movement. He was the founding member of a local environment group called Pickering/Ajax Citizens Together For The Environment.

== Politics ==
Wiseman ran for the Ontario legislature in the 1987 provincial election, and finished third behind Liberal Norah Stoner and a Progressive Conservative candidate in the Greater Toronto Area riding of Durham West. He ran for the federal New Democratic Party in the Canadian election of 1988 in the riding of Ontario. During the campaign, he spoke against Toronto dumping garbage at Brock West a local garbage dump. He finished third behind Progressive Conservative René Soetens and a Liberal candidate.

Wiseman ran again in the provincial election of 1990. This time he was elected over Norah Stoner by 1,982 votes. During the next five years in government he served as parliamentary assistant to several ministers between 1991 and 1995.

In 1992, Wiseman and fellow Durham MPP Drummond White became involved in a minor controversy when it was found they were billing taxpayers for the cost of renting a shared apartment in Toronto. He claimed that working long hours as an MPP justified his need for the apartment. Due to the publicity, he and White ended the lease in August 1992.

In 1995, Wiseman helped broker a deal between the Town of Pickering and the Pickering Harbour Company. Development around Frenchman's Bay had been frozen since 1966 when the town objected to a development proposal. The company claimed it wasn't bound by municipal rules since it was a federally chartered company. The new deal allowed development to proceed as long as municipal rules were followed.

In the 1995 provincial election, Wiseman finished third in Durham West, falling almost 20,000 votes behind Progressive Conservative Janet Ecker.

He stood for office again in the provincial election of 1999 for the redistributed riding of Pickering—Ajax—Uxbridge, but received only 2,814 votes—and again lost to Janet Ecker by almost 20,000 votes. Wiseman returned to teaching at Ajax High School after leaving the legislature.
