= Progressive Conservative Party of Ontario candidates in the 1987 Ontario provincial election =

The Progressive Conservative Party of Ontario ran a full slate of candidates in the 1987 Ontario provincial election, and elected 16 out of 130 candidates to become the third-largest party in the legislature. Some of these candidates have their own biography pages; information about others may be found here.

== Irene Paparo-Stein (Oakwood) ==
Paparo-Stein lived in Winnipeg during the 1970s, and gained local fame for taking the city to court over its use of chemical pesticides (which she believed were responsible for illnesses in her family). She also worked for freedom of information legislation. After moving to Toronto, she worked at the Immigrant Women's Job Placement Centre, and as program coordinator for the Ontario Human Rights Commission's Youth Employment Program. She was also an official with the York Board of Education. Paparo-Stein was forty-seven years old at the time of the election.

She did not have strong historical ties to the Progressive Conservative party, and was in fact interviewed by the Ontario Liberal Party as a potential candidate in 1987. She chose to run as a Progressive Conservative after being told that Oakwood was reserved for another Liberal candidate. She received 1,573 votes (6.79%), finishing third against Liberal Chaviva Hošek.

She later criticized the federal Progressive Conservative government of Brian Mulroney in 1988, after Mulroney announced a compensation package for Japanese Canadians who had been detained during World War II. Paparo-Stein was quoted as saying, "What about compensation for the Italians, the Germans and the Ukrainians? You can't just compensate one group. That's discrimination [...] This exploitation of ethnics is bull".

Paparo-Stein released a book entitled Cities Under Siege in 1988, focusing primarily on her battles with the City of Winnipeg. The Globe and Mail newspaper gave it a favourable review, but the Toronto Star criticized it as "a tedious, meandering account".

== Chuck Bradley (St. Catharines) ==
Bradley received 4,258 votes (15.33%), finishing third against Liberal incumbent Jim Bradley.

== Fred De Francesco (York South) ==
De Francesco was a 38-year-old insurance broker in 1987. During the campaign, he strongly criticized the New Democratic Party's plan to nationalize auto insurance. He received 1,544 votes (5.51%), finishing third against NDP leader Bob Rae. In 1988, he helped to organize a "Tory Gala" in Woodbridge.

De Francesco later became principal of Fairview Insurance Brokers. He co-hosted "Night at the Races" at the Woodbine Racetrack in 2004 and 2005, and was awarded the Lew Dunn Memorial Award in May 2006.
