= Shelley Wark-Martyn =

Canadian politician (born 1963)

The Honourable Shelley Wark-Martyn ECO

Ontario MPP
- In office 1990–1995
- Preceded by: Taras Kozyra
- Succeeded by: Michael Gravelle
- Constituency: Port Arthur

Personal details
- Born: January 11, 1963 (age 63) Thunder Bay, Ontario
- Party: Ontario NDP; Alberta Liberal Party
- Spouse: Kelly Martyn
- Children: 2
- Occupation: Nurse, social worker

Shelley Wark-Martyn (born January 11, 1963) is a former politician from Ontario, Canada. She was a New Democratic Party (NDP) member of the Legislative Assembly of Ontario from 1990 to 1995. She represented the riding of Port Arthur. She served as a cabinet minister in the government of Bob Rae. Almost two decades later, she served as president of the Alberta Liberal Party, stepping down in order to run in Calgary-Currie as a Liberal candidate in the 2015 provincial election.

== Background ==
Wark-Martyn was a social worker and registered nurse before entering political life. In 1987 she received an injury in the workplace that ended her nursing career. She received a small disability pension from the Worker's Compensation Board. She is married to Kelly with whom she has two children, Kurtis and Erika.

== Provincial politics ==
She was elected to the Ontario legislature in the 1990 provincial election, defeating incumbent Liberal Taras Kozyra by 1,034 votes in the Northern Ontario riding of Port Arthur.

The NDP won a majority government and Wark-Martyn was appointed as Rae's first Minister of Revenue on October 1, 1990. In November, Wark-Martyn introduced a bill to ensure that goods and services tax (GST) would not be stacked on top of provincial tax. In December, she was featured as part of "Women of the Year" on the cover of Chatelaine magazine along with ten other women cabinet ministers.

During her tenure as Revenue Minister she dealt with such issues as a proposed market value assessment property tax system for Toronto, giving tax breaks to border communities to stem the flow of cross border shoppers and collecting tax on goods that shoppers bring back across the border. She also studied a possible harmonization of the GST with provincial sales tax, a policy eventually adopted in 2010.

In February 1993, Bob Rae drastically reduced the size of his cabinet. The Revenue Minister position was abolished and Wark-Martyn was transferred to Minister without portfolio responsible for Education and Training, assisting Education Minister Dave Cooke. On June 17, 1993, she was reassigned as a minister without portfolio responsible for health, assisting Health Minister Ruth Grier.

In early 1995, Wark-Martyn announced that Lakehead University and Confederation College would receive almost $1 million in grants to develop programs and services to aboriginal people.

The NDP were defeated in the provincial election of 1995, and Wark-Martyn lost her seat to Liberal Michael Gravelle by almost 7,000 votes.

=== Cabinet positions ===
Rae ministry, Province of Ontario (1990–1995)
Cabinet posts (3)
Predecessor	Office	Successor
Remo Mancini	Minister of Revenue; 1990–1993	Position abolished (Note: This ministry position remained vacant until it was re-established in 2007 by Dalton McGuinty. The new minister was Michael Chan.)
Sub-Cabinet Posts (2)
Predecessor	Title	Successor
	Minister Without Portfolio (1993–1995); Responsible for Health	
New position	Minister Without Portfolio (1993 February–June); Responsible for Education and Training	Mike Farnan

== Later life ==
In 1997 she was elected to the council of Oliver Township in the metro area of Thunder Bay in 1997. In 1999, she was appointed to the Capital Regional Health Board.

In 2004, Wark-Martyn began working in Calgary, Alberta for Bayshore Home Health, a home-delivery health-care service. Before this, she had worked in sales marketing for Pampered Chef. She became involved in the Alberta Liberal Party, eventually running for the presidency of the party and winning that position in May 2014. She was the party's candidate for the riding of Calgary-Currie in the 2015 provincial election, placing fourth with 7.7% of the vote.
