= Mike Dietsch =

Canadian politician (1942–2014)

Lord Mayor of Niagara-on-the-Lake
- In office 1991–1997
- Preceded by: Stan Ignatczyk
- Succeeded by: Art Viola

Ontario MPP
- In office 1987–1990
- Preceded by: Peter Partington
- Succeeded by: Christel Haeck
- Constituency: St. Catharines—Brock

Personal details
- Born: February 2, 1942 Toronto, Ontario
- Died: March 9, 2014 (aged 72) Niagara-on-the-Lake, Ontario
- Party: Liberal
- Spouse: Gail Dietsch
- Children: 6
- Occupation: Farmer

Michael Murray Dietsch (February 2, 1942 – March 9, 2014) was a politician in Ontario, Canada. He served in the Legislative Assembly of Ontario as a Liberal from 1987 to 1990. He also served as Lord Mayor of Niagara-on-the-Lake from 1991 to 1997.

== Background ==
Dietsch was educated at Niagara District secondary school, and was a small farm operator and automotive worker in private life. He served as an alderman in Niagara-on-the-Lake from 1974 to 1982 and 1985 to 1987, and was a Regional Councillor from 1982 to 1987 and Deputy Lord Mayor from 1985 to 1987. He was also president of the Niagara-on-the-Lake Jaycees. He lived in Niagara-on-the-Lake, Ontario with his wife Gail. Together they raised six children.

== Politics ==
He was elected to the Ontario legislature in the 1987 provincial election, defeating incumbent Progressive Conservative Peter Partington by 2001 votes in the constituency of St. Catharines—Brock. For the next three years, he served as a backbench supporter of David Peterson's government. During his tenure he sponsored and successfully passed three private member's bills - the allowance of credit card sales at wineries, the allowance of Sunday openings at wineries and an irrigation bill to allow farmers to use irrigation ditches to water their crops.

The Liberals were defeated by the Ontario New Democratic Party in the 1990 provincial election and Dietsch lost his seat to Christel Haeck of the NDP by 1,159 votes.

Dietsch returned to municipal politics in 1991 when he was elected Lord Mayor of Niagara-on-the-Lake. He was re-elected in 1994. He was elected as a Regional Councillor for Niagara-on-the-Lake in 1997. Later that year, he sought the Chairmanship of the Niagara Regional Municipality, but lost to Grimsby Regional Councillor Debbie Zimmerman. He did not seek re-election in 2000.

== Later life ==
He ran a bed and breakfast inn in the town until 2007 when he retired. He died in 2014 after a long battle with cancer.
