= Taras Kozyra =

Canadian politician

Ontario MPP
- In office 1987–1990
- Preceded by: Jim Foulds
- Succeeded by: Shelley Wark-Martyn
- Constituency: Port Arthur

Personal details
- Born: September 26, 1941 (age 84) Ukraine
- Party: Liberal
- Occupation: Teacher

Taras Kozyra (born September 26, 1941) is a former politician in Ontario, Canada. He was a Liberal member of the Legislative Assembly of Ontario from 1987 to 1990.

== Background ==
Kozrya moved to Canada at a young age, and was educated at the University of Western Ontario and Lakehead University. He worked in Thunder Bay as a teacher.

== Politics ==
He served as a councillor in the Thunder Bay City Council from 1972 to 1978 and from 1982 to 1987.

He was elected to the Ontario legislature in the 1987 provincial election, defeating NDP candidate Chris Southcott by just under 2,000 votes in the riding of Port Arthur. He served as a backbench supporter of David Peterson's government for the next three years, and was parliamentary assistant to the Minister of Northern Development on two occasions.

The Liberals lost to the NDP in the 1990 provincial election, and Kozyra lost his seat to NDP candidate Shelley Wark-Martyn by 1,034 votes.

== Later life ==
Kozyra was the principal of the English section of the Korean International School of Hong Kong (KIS) between 2004 and 2006.
