= Norah Stoner =

Canadian politician

Ontario MPP
- In office 1987–1990
- Preceded by: George Ashe
- Succeeded by: Jim Wiseman
- Constituency: Durham West

Personal details
- Born: 20 April 1945 (age 80) Toronto, Ontario
- Party: Liberal
- Occupation: Painter

Norah Jane Stoner (April 20, 1945) is a former politician in Ontario, Canada. She was a Liberal member of the Legislative Assembly of Ontario from 1987 to 1990.

== Background ==
Stoner worked as a commercial artist before entering political life.

== Politics ==
Stoner was a member of the Pickering Council from 1977 to 1983, and of the Durham Regional Council from 1983 to 1987.

She was elected to the Ontario legislature in the 1987 provincial election, defeating incumbent Progressive Conservative George Ashe by almost 6,000 votes in the riding of Durham West. She served as a backbench supporter of David Peterson's government, and was appointed as parliamentary assistant to the Minister of Colleges and Universities in 1989.

The Liberals were defeated by the NDP in the 1990 provincial election, and Stoner lost her seat to NDP candidate Jim Wiseman by just under 2,000 votes.

== Later life ==
Stoner returned to working as a painter, and operates the Norah Stoner Studio in Toronto.
