= Linda LeBourdais =

Canadian politician

Ontario MPP
- In office 1987–1990
- Preceded by: New riding
- Succeeded by: Chris Stockwell
- Constituency: Etobicoke West

Personal details
- Born: March 31, 1945 (age 81) Montreal, Quebec
- Party: Liberal
- Occupation: Business executive

Linda Lillian LeBourdais (born March 31, 1945) is a former politician in Ontario, Canada. She was a Liberal member of the Legislative Assembly of Ontario from 1987 to 1990.

== Background ==
LeBourdais was educated at Ryerson Polytechnical Institute, and worked as a public relations and marketing consultant in the fashion and retail sectors. She has served as president of the federal Liberal riding association in Etobicoke Centre, and of the Etobicoke Centre Women's Committee. LeBourdais was also the national director of Stay Alert ... Stay Safe, a national non-profit organization in the field of child safety.

== Politics ==
In 1987 provincial election, she ran as the Liberal party candidate in the riding of Etobicoke West. She won the nomination on May 3 at a contentious nomination meeting. Other contenders including former MPP Leonard Braithwaite claimed that LeBourdais signed up a large block of members for which she failed to provide a list to other nominees. There was also an allegation that some of the members lived outside the riding. In addition, the three member arbitration panel appointed to review the decision resigned due to a conflict of interest. In July a newly appointed arbitration panel upheld the decision saying they were "unable to prove sufficient voting irregularities to overturn the meeting".

In the election held in September 1987, she won the election defeating Progressive Conservative Doug Holyday by 6,090 votes. She served as a backbench supporter of David Peterson's government for the next three years, and was a parliamentary assistant in 1988-89. She served as advocate from Ontario's clothing and apparel industry during her time in office.

Prior to the 1990 provincial election, LeBourdais was challenged for the Liberal nomination by a representative of a local Sikh group, which claimed the Peterson government was insufficiently responsive to minority communities. She won the nomination, but was defeated in the general election by Chris Stockwell of the Progressive Conservative Party.

=== Electoral record ===
1987 Ontario general election: Etobicoke West
Party	Candidate	Votes	%
Liberal	Linda LeBourdais	15,757	46.90
Progressive Conservative	Doug Holyday	9,664	28.76
New Democratic	Phil Jones	5,784	17.21
Family Coalition	Judy Johnson	1,890	5.62
Libertarian	Robert Dunk	498	1.51
Total valid votes		33,593	100.00

1990 Ontario general election: Etobicoke West
Party	Candidate	Votes	%
Progressive Conservative	Chris Stockwell	13,711	40.8
Liberal	Linda LeBourdais	10,082	30.0
New Democratic	Judy Jones	7,988	23.8
Family Coalition	Kevin McGourty	1,045	3.1
Libertarian	Janice Hazlett	495	1.5
Independent	Martin Fraser	303	0.9
Total		33,624	
Source: "How Metro-Area Voted". The Toronto Daily Star. Toronto. 1990-09-07. p. A10.

== After politics ==
She returned to the private sector after her defeat, and became president of Mentor Communications. In 2005, she was appointed as a member of Ontario's Social Benefits Tribunal.
