= Ottawa—Rideau =

Former provincial electoral district in Ontario, Canada

Coordinates: 45°21′N 75°47′W

Ontario electoral district
- Map of the riding

Ottawa–Rideau was a short lived provincial electoral district in Ottawa, Ontario, Canada. It elected one member to the Legislative Assembly of Ontario. It was created in 1987 and was abolished in 1999 into Ottawa South, Nepean–Carleton, Ottawa West–Nepean and Ottawa Centre.

The riding included all of pre-amalgamation Ottawa south of Walkley Road south of Baseline Road. It also included part of the city of Gloucester north of Leitrim Road between Limebank Road and Conroy Road. It also included part of the city of Nepean northeast of this line: Black Rapids Creek to Woodroffe Avenue to CN railway to Merivale Road.

The riding elected two members of the Legislative Assembly: Yvonne O'Neill, a Liberal from 1987 to 1995 and then Garry Guzzo, a Progressive Conservative from 1995 to 1999.

== Election results ==
1995 Ontario general election
Party	Candidate	Votes	%	±%	Expenditures
Progressive Conservative	Garry Guzzo	14,796	45.11	+27.49	$42,588.00
Liberal	Yvonne O'Neill	13,273	40.47	–4.84	$42,982.18
New Democratic	Dan McIntyre	4,138	12.62	–17.17	$29,016.02
Green	Lenora Burke	412	1.26	–	$0
Natural Law	Richard Michael Wolfson	178	0.54	–	$0
Total valid votes/expense limit		32,797	99.17	–	$47,240.00
Total rejected, unmarked and declined ballots		274	0.83	–0.58	
Turnout		33,071	61.29	+1.33	
Eligible voters		53,961			
Progressive Conservative gain from Liberal		Swing		+22.33	
Source: Elections Ontario

1990 Ontario general election
Party	Candidate	Votes	%	±%
Liberal	Yvonne O'Neill	13,454	45.31	–4.89
New Democratic	Ernest (Larry) Jones	8,845	29.79	+8.54
Progressive Conservative	Paul M. Beaudry	5,234	17.63	–10.94
Family Coalition	Laurent Omer (Larry) Denys	1,049	3.53	–
Independent	James (Jim) MacPhee	861	2.90	–
Libertarian	Marc A. Schindler	252	0.85	–
Total valid votes		29,695	98.59	
Total rejected, unmarked and declined ballots		425	1.41	+0.79
Turnout		30,120	59.96	+0.62
Eligible voters		50,235		
Liberal hold		Swing		–6.72
Source: Elections Ontario

1987 Ontario general election
Party	Candidate	Votes	%
Liberal	Yvonne O'Neill	14,179	50.20
Progressive Conservative	Pamela (Pam) Forward	8,068	28.56
New Democratic	Beatrice (Bea) Murray	6,000	21.24
Total valid votes		28,247	99.38
Total rejected ballots		176	0.62
Turnout		28,423	59.34
Eligible voters		47,898	
Liberal pickup new district.			
Source: Elections Ontario

== See also ==
- List of Ontario provincial electoral districts
- Canadian provincial electoral districts
