= Dalton McGuinty Sr. =

Canadian politician

Member of the Ontario Provincial Parliament for Ottawa South
- In office September 10, 1987 – March 16, 1990
- Preceded by: Claude Bennett
- Succeeded by: Dalton McGuinty

Personal details
- Born: Dalton James Patrick McGuinty; August 13, 1926 Osceola, Ontario, Canada
- Died: March 16, 1990 (aged 63) Ottawa, Ontario, Canada
- Party: Liberal
- Spouse: Elizabeth Pexton
- Children: 10, including Dalton and David

Dalton James Patrick McGuinty (August 13, 1926 – March 16, 1990) was a Canadian politician from Ontario. A member of the Ontario Liberal Party, he was elected to the Legislative Assembly of Ontario from 1987 to 1990. He represented the riding of Ottawa South. He had 10 children, including Dalton McGuinty who was Premier of Ontario from 2003 to 2013, and David McGuinty who has been a member of the House of Commons of the Parliament of Canada since 2004.

== Background ==
McGuinty was born in Osceola, Ontario, to Dora (Foley) and Charles McGuinty. The family later moved to Ottawa, Ontario. He was educated at Colgate University in Hamilton, New York, the University of Ottawa and Harvard Business School. He worked as professor of English at the University of Ottawa and served as a separate school trustee on the Ottawa Board of Education from 1972 to the end of 1986. His position as a separate school trustee ended in December 1986 when full funding for separate schools was implemented.

He was married to a nurse, Elizabeth Pexton, with whom he had six sons and four daughters. Two of his sons were notable politicians in their own right – former Premier of Ontario, Dalton McGuinty, and David McGuinty, a member of the House of Commons of the Parliament of Canada.

== Politics ==
He was elected to the Ontario legislature in the 1987 provincial election, easily defeating his Progressive Conservative opponent in the constituency of Ottawa South. He served as a backbench supporter of David Peterson's government. From 1988 to 1989 he served as Parliamentary Assistant to the Minister of Skills Development.

He died on March 16, 1990, after suffering a heart attack while shoveling snow in his driveway. He was 63 years old.

His son, Dalton Jr., said his father entered politics because be believed he could do something for the average person. He said his father was interested in environmental and educational issues and taking care of seniors.
