= Yvonne O'Neill =

Canadian politician

Ontario MPP
- In office 1987–1995
- Preceded by: New riding
- Succeeded by: Gary Guzzo
- Constituency: Ottawa–Rideau

Personal details
- Born: Yvonne Anne Bray; June 9, 1936; Toronto, Ontario
- Died: September 6, 2010 (aged 74); Amherst, Nova Scotia
- Political party: Liberal
- Occupation: Teacher

Yvonne O'Neill (June 9, 1936 – September 6, 2010) was a politician from Ontario, Canada. She was a Liberal member of the Legislative Assembly of Ontario from 1987 to 1995. She represented the riding of Ottawa–Rideau.

== Background ==
O'Neill was born as Yvonne Anne Bray in Toronto, Ontario, and was educated at the University of Toronto and the Ontario College of Education. She worked as a secondary school teacher from 1958 to 1964, and later served as a trustee on the Carleton Roman Catholic Separate School Board of Education.

== Political career ==
She was elected to the Ontario legislature in the 1987 provincial election, defeating her Progressive Conservative opponent by more than 6000 votes in the riding of Ottawa–Rideau. The Liberals won a majority government in this election under David Peterson, and O'Neill served as parliamentary assistant to the Minister of Education in 1987–1988.

The Liberals were upset by the New Democratic Party in the 1990 provincial election, although O'Neill was comfortably re-elected in her own riding. She served as Deputy Opposition Whip from 1990 to 1992, and held a number of official critic positions.

The Progressive Conservatives won a majority government in the 1995 provincial election, and O'Neill lost her riding to Progressive Conservative Garry Guzzo by 1,523 votes.

== Later life ==
She went on to serve with Elections Canada as the Federal Returning Officer for the electoral district of Ottawa West Nepean.

She died from cancer on September 6, 2010, at the Cumberland Regional Health Centre in Amherst, Nova Scotia at the age of 74. A funeral was held on September 15, 2010, at the St. Augustine's Catholic Church in Ottawa.
