= York—Scarborough =

York—Scarborough may refer to:

- York—Scarborough (federal electoral district), in Canada
- York—Scarborough (provincial electoral district), in Canada

== See also ==
- Scarborough (constituency), in England
