= Scarborough Centre (provincial electoral district) =

Provincial electoral district in Ontario, Canada

Ontario electoral district
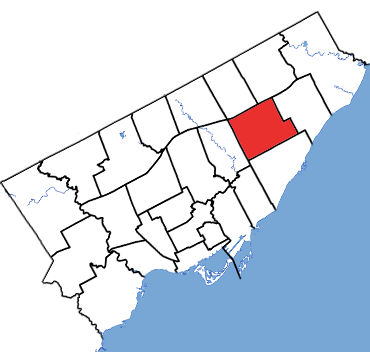
- Scarborough Centre in relation to the other Toronto ridings
- Coordinates: 43.753°N 79.273°W

Provincial electoral district
- Legislature: Legislative Assembly of Ontario
MPP
David Smith
Progressive Conservative
- District created: 1963
- First contested: 1963
- Last contested: 2025

Demographics
- Population (2016): 112,600
- Electors (2018): 75,493
- Area (km²): 28
- Pop. density (per km²): 4,021.4
- Census division: Toronto
- Census subdivision: Toronto

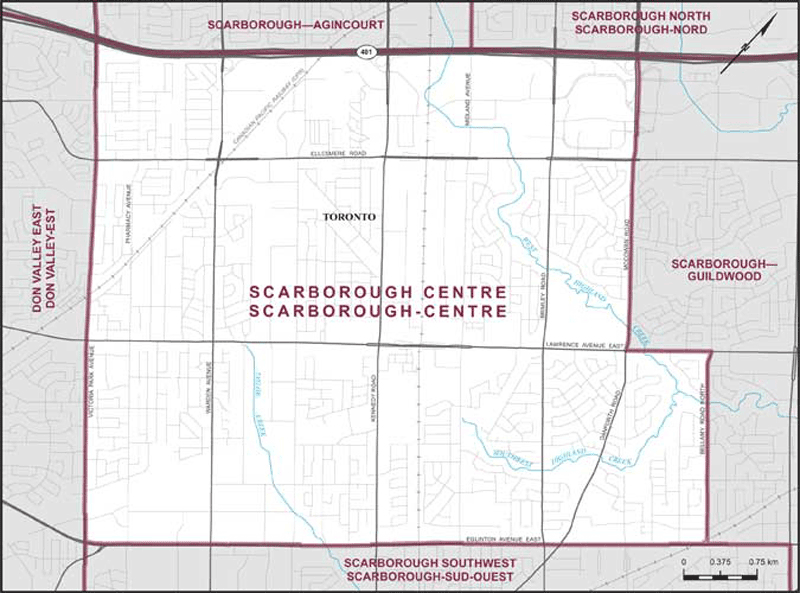
Map of Scarborough Centre

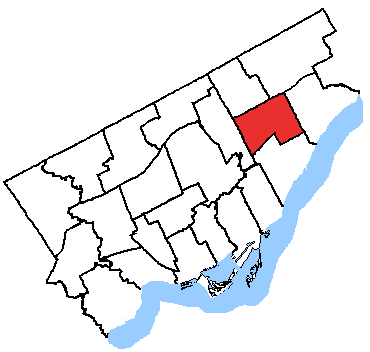
Scarborough Centre from 2003 to 2018

Scarborough Centre is a provincial electoral district in Ontario, Canada, that has been represented in Legislative Assembly of Ontario since 1963.

It consists of the part of the Scarborough district of the city of Toronto bounded:

- on the west by Victoria Park Avenue,
- on the north by Highway 401,
- on the east by McCowan Road, Lawrence Avenue East and Bellamy Road North, and
- on the south by Eglinton Avenue East.

Notable landmarks in Scarborough Centre include:

- Scarborough Civic Centre, site of east Toronto district council meetings, and adjacent Albert Campbell Square
- Scarborough Town Centre, a large shopping mall
- Scarborough Centre (TTC) Line 3 station
- Scarborough and Rouge Hospital, General Division
- Scarborough Museum

It was represented in the Ontario Legislature by PC Christina Mitas since 2018, who did not run for re-election in 2022.

Scarborough Centre is a bellwether riding, having voted for the winner in every election since 1971 (longer than any other provincial riding). However, it did comprise different territories, changing shape significantly between the 1995 and 1999 elections.

== Boundaries ==
The riding was created in 1963 through an amendment to the Representation Act. It was formed from the south central part of the former riding of York—Scarborough, formed in 1955, the year following the erection of Metropolitan Toronto, departing from York East, where it had been part of since 1867, and represented in the past by such Scarborough Township residents as:

- John Richardson, (1894–1904),
- Alexander McCowan, (1905–1913),
- John A. Leslie, (1945–1948), and
- Hollis Beckett; (1951–1967) the latter remained with the York East riding.

With the rapid growth of Scarborough Township in the decade following the erection of Metropolitan Toronto, York—Scarborough, unlike its federal counterpart that remained into the 1970s, was split into four separate ridings in 1963; and MPP Dick Sutton did not seek re-election into any of the new ridings. The initial Scarborough Centre riding was bordered by:

- Lawrence Avenue to the north, Kennedy Road to the west, Lake Ontario to the south and Markham Road to the east.

In 1975, the boundary was significantly altered. The northern boundary of Lawrence Avenue and the southern boundary of Lake Ontario were retained. The western boundary was redrawn as follows: from Lawrence Avenue, it followed the CNR right-of-way located west of Midland Avenue south and then curved southeast to where it met Midland Avenue at Danforth Road. It followed Midland Avenue south to Kingston Road where it turned southwest following Kingston to a point where a northerly extension of Wynnview Court would meet the road. It then turned south along Wynnview Court and continued on the same line south until it met the lake. The eastern boundary started at Lawrence Avenue and went south on Scarborough Golf Club Road following this road to the CNR right-of-way. It followed the tracks west to Markham Road and then south to the lake.

In 1987 the boundary was altered again. The northern boundary of Lawrence Avenue and the southern boundary of Lake Ontario were retained. The eastern boundary starting at the lake went north along Kennedy Road to Eglinton Avenue. It then turned east for a short distance to the CPR right-of-way. It followed the right-of-way north to Lawrence Avenue. The eastern border was moved to Markham Road going from the lake to Lawrence Avenue.

In 1995, the riding was radically changed with a union with the Scarborough-Ellesmere riding, and in 2007, with the creation of the Scarborough-Guildwood riding, and the northwest corner transferred from Scarborough-Agincourt. For the first time, the Scarborough Centre was now in the riding.

== Members of Provincial Parliament ==
Scarborough Centre
Assembly	Years	Member	Party
Riding created from York—Scarborough
27th	1963–1967	George Peck	Progressive Conservative
28th	1967–1971	Margaret Renwick	New Democratic
29th	1971–1975	Frank Drea	Progressive Conservative
30th	1975–1977	Frank Drea	Progressive Conservative
31st	1977–1981	Frank Drea	Progressive Conservative
32nd	1981–1985	Frank Drea	Progressive Conservative
33rd	1985–1987	William C. Davis	Progressive Conservative
34th	1987–1990	Cindy Nicholas	Liberal
35th	1990–1995	Steve Owens	New Democratic
36th	1995–1999	Dan Newman	Progressive Conservative
37th	1999–2003	Marilyn Mushinski	Progressive Conservative
38th	2003–2007	Brad Duguid	Liberal
39th	2007–2011	Brad Duguid	Liberal
40th	2011–2014	Brad Duguid	Liberal
41st	2014–2018	Brad Duguid	Liberal
42nd	2018–2022	Christina Mitas	Progressive Conservative
43rd	2022–2025	David Smith	Progressive Conservative
44th	2025–present	David Smith	Progressive Conservative
Sourced from the Ontario Legislative Assembly

== Election results ==
Winning party in each polling division of Scarborough Centre riding at the 2025 Ontario general election

2025 Ontario general election
Party	Candidate	Votes	%	±%
Progressive Conservative	David Smith	13,363	44.05	+8.05
Liberal	Mazhar Shafiq	12,839	42.32	+11.95
New Democratic	Sonali Chakraborti	2,628	8.66	–17.56
Green	Dean Boulding	918	3.03	+0.23
New Blue	Gus Prokos	379	1.25	+0.14
Centrist	Haseeb Qureshi	211	0.70	–
Total valid votes		30,338	98.99	
Total rejected, unmarked and declined ballots		310	1.01	+0.23
Turnout		30,648	38.65	–2.60
Eligible voters		79,287		
Progressive Conservative hold		Swing		–1.95
Source: Elections Ontario

Winning party in each polling division of Scarborough Centre riding at the 2022 Ontario general election

2022 Ontario general election
Party	Candidate	Votes	%	±%	Expenditures
Progressive Conservative	David Smith	11,471	35.99	–2.46	$20,592
Liberal	Mazhar Shafiq	9,678	30.37	+8.23	$96,601
New Democratic	Neethan Shan	8,358	26.23	–7.14	$79,499
Green	Fatima Faruq	892	2.80	+0.48	$381
Libertarian	Serge Korovitsyn	392	1.23	–1.39	$84
New Blue	Hidie Jaber	355	1.11	–	$1,292
Ontario Party	Raphael Rosch	297	0.93	–	$887
Independent	Kostadinos Stefanis	196	0.62	–	$0
Independent	Paul Beatty	156	0.49	–	$579
Moderate	Maria Tzvetanova	74	0.23	–	$0
Total valid votes/expense limit		31,869	99.22	–	$109,001
Total rejected, unmarked and declined ballots		251	0.78	–0.33	
Turnout		32,120	41.25	–11.93	
Eligible voters		77,858			
Progressive Conservative hold		Swing		–5.34	
Source: Elections Ontario

2018 Ontario general election
Party	Candidate	Votes	%	±%
Progressive Conservative	Christina Mitas	15,266	38.45	+17.46
New Democratic	Zeyd Bismilla	13,247	33.36	+12.75
Liberal	Mazhar Shafiq	8,791	22.14	–33.05
Libertarian	Matthew Dougherty	1,040	2.62	–
Green	Sanjin Zeco	919	2.31	–0.78
Trillium	Chris Mellor	441	1.11	–
Total valid votes		39,704	98.89	
Total rejected, unmarked and declined ballots		447	1.11	–0.16
Turnout		40,151	53.19	+5.10
Eligible voters		75,493		
Progressive Conservative notional gain from Liberal		Swing		+25.25
Source: Elections Ontario

2014 general election redistributed results
Party	Vote	%
Liberal	18,648	55.19
Progressive Conservative	7,093	20.99
New Democratic	6,967	20.62
Green	1,046	3.10
Others	35	0.10

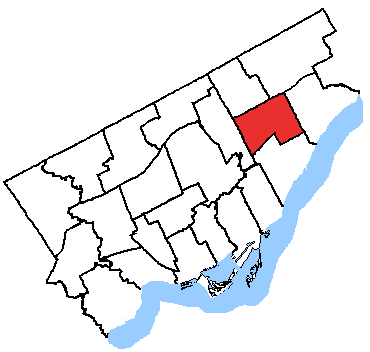
Present day boundaries

2014 Ontario general election
Party	Candidate	Votes	%	±%
Liberal	Brad Duguid	19,390	55.05	+3.63
Progressive Conservative	David Ramalho	7,599	21.58	–2.35
New Democratic	Carol Baker	7,145	20.29	–1.62
Green	Edward Yaghledjian	1,086	3.08	+1.31
Total valid votes		35,220	98.72	
Total rejected, unmarked and declined ballots		455	1.28	+0.71
Turnout		35,675	48.09	+3.60
Eligible voters		74,190		
Liberal hold		Swing		+2.99
Source: Elections Ontario

2011 Ontario general election
Party	Candidate	Votes	%	±%
Liberal	Brad Duguid	16,142	51.43	–2.24
Progressive Conservative	Carol Williams	7,511	23.93	–1.19
New Democratic	Kathleen Mathurin	6,876	21.91	+8.62
Green	Jeff Mole	558	1.78	–3.74
Freedom	David Driver	301	0.96	–
Total valid votes		31,388	99.43	
Total rejected, unmarked and declined ballots		180	0.57	–0.59
Turnout		31,568	44.49	–3.57
Eligible voters		70,958		
Liberal hold		Swing		–0.52
Source: Elections Ontario

2007 Ontario general election
Party	Candidate	Votes	%	±%
Liberal	Brad Duguid	17,775	53.66	+1.60
Progressive Conservative	Samy Appadurai	8,320	25.12	–2.92
New Democratic	Kathleen Mathurin	4,401	13.29	+4.52
Green	Andrew Strachan	1,827	5.52	+3.98
Family Coalition	Thomas Lang	451	1.36	+0.17
Libertarian	David Predovich	349	1.05	–
Total valid votes		33,123	98.84	
Total rejected, unmarked and declined ballots		389	1.16	+0.02
Turnout		33,512	48.06	–8.54
Eligible voters		69,729		
Liberal hold		Swing		+2.26
Source: Elections Ontario

2003 Ontario general election
Party	Candidate	Votes	%	±%
Liberal	Brad Duguid	21,698	52.07	+17.54
Progressive Conservative	Marilyn Mushinski	11,686	28.04	–15.08
New Democratic	Michael Laxer	3,653	8.77	–11.15
Independent	Costas Manios	3,259	7.82	–26.71
Green	Robert Carty	642	1.54	–
Family Coalition	Joseph Internicola	495	1.19	–0.17
Communist	Elizabeth Rowley	241	0.58	–
Total valid votes		41,674	98.86	
Total rejected, unmarked and declined ballots		482	1.14	+0.10
Turnout		42,156	56.60	–1.64
Eligible voters		74,481		
Liberal gain from Progressive Conservative		Swing		+16.31
Source: Elections Ontario

1999 Ontario general election
Party	Candidate	Votes	%	±%
Progressive Conservative	Marilyn Mushinski	18,189	43.12	–2.76
Liberal	Costas Manios	14,565	34.53	+8.69
New Democratic	Sid Ryan	8,399	19.91	–4.77
Family Coalition	Rina Morra	573	1.36	–
Natural Law	Eileen Murray	455	1.08	–0.18
Total valid votes		42,181	98.95	
Total rejected, unmarked and declined ballots		446	1.05	–0.24
Turnout		42,627	58.24	–5.11
Eligible voters		73,196		
Progressive Conservative hold		Swing		–5.72
Source: Elections Ontario

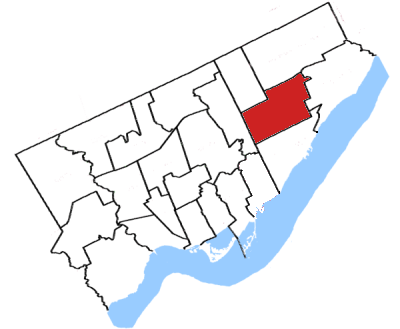
Riding boundaries after 1996 redistribution

== 2007 electoral reform referendum ==
2007 Ontario electoral reform referendum
Side	Votes	%
First Past the Post	19,259	61.7
Mixed member proportional	12,444	38.3
Total valid votes	31,701	100.0

== Historic election results ==
1995 Ontario general election
Party	Candidate	Votes	%	±%
Progressive Conservative	Dan Newman	12,717	45.88	+25.04
Liberal	Mary Ellen Pimblett	7,163	25.84	–8.11
New Democratic	Steve Owens	6,841	24.68	–20.53
Independent	John Brereton	649	2.34	–
Natural Law	Eleanor Toshiko Hyodo	349	1.26	–
Total valid votes		27,719	98.72	
Total rejected, unmarked and declined ballots		360	1.28	–0.30
Turnout		28,079	63.35	–1.10
Eligible voters		44,325		
Progressive Conservative gain from New Democratic		Swing		+22.79
Source: Elections Ontario

1990 Ontario general election
Party	Candidate	Votes	%	±%
New Democratic	Steve Owens	12,324	45.21	+15.85
Liberal	Cindy Nicholas	9,256	33.95	–7.10
Progressive Conservative	Joe Trentadue	5,682	20.84	–4.01
Total valid votes		27,262	98.42	
Total rejected, unmarked and declined ballots		439	1.58	+0.81
Turnout		27,701	64.45	–0.04
Eligible voters		42,981		
New Democratic gain from Liberal		Swing		+11.47
Source: Elections Ontario

1987 Ontario general election
Party	Candidate	Votes	%	±%
Liberal	Cindy Nicholas	11,921	41.05	+6.92
New Democratic	Menno Vorster	8,525	29.36	–0.95
Progressive Conservative	William C. Davis	7,217	24.85	–10.71
Family Coalition	Chris Douros	827	2.85	–
Independent	Martin Weatherall	550	1.89	–
Total valid votes		29,040	99.23	
Total rejected ballots		226	0.77	+0.07
Turnout		29,266	64.49	+6.82
Eligible voters		45,380		
Liberal gain from Progressive Conservative		Swing		+3.94
Source: Elections Ontario

1985 Ontario general election
Party	Candidate	Votes	%	±%
Progressive Conservative	William C. Davis	8,890	35.56	–20.35
Liberal	Gerald Lennon	8,531	34.13	+13.77
New Democratic	Barry Christensen	7,577	30.31	+8.90
Total valid votes		24,998	99.30	
Total rejected ballots		177	0.70	+0.08
Turnout		25,175	57.67	+4.69
Eligible voters		43,654		
Progressive Conservative hold		Swing		–17.06
Source: Elections Ontario

1981 Ontario general election
Party	Candidate	Votes	%	±%
Progressive Conservative	Frank Drea	12,793	55.92	+11.16
New Democratic	Paul Rook	4,898	21.41	–12.53
Liberal	Kurt Christensen	4,657	20.35	–0.02
Libertarian	D'Arcy J. Cain	531	2.32	+1.74
Total valid votes		22,879	99.38	
Total rejected ballots		143	0.62	+0.20
Turnout		23,022	52.98	–10.94
Eligible voters		43,458		
Progressive Conservative hold		Swing		+11.85
Source: Elections Ontario

1977 Ontario general election
Party	Candidate	Votes	%	±%
Progressive Conservative	Frank Drea	11,583	44.76	+3.61
New Democratic	David Gracey	8,784	33.94	–3.10
Liberal	Charles Beer	5,274	20.38	+0.43
Libertarian	Robert Schultz	151	0.58	–0.05
Communist	Peter Sideris	87	0.34	–0.89
Total valid votes		25,879	99.58	
Total rejected ballots		109	0.42	+0.05
Turnout		25,988	63.91	–0.13
Eligible voters		40,661		
Progressive Conservative hold		Swing		+3.36
Source: Elections Ontario

1975 Ontario general election
Party	Candidate	Votes	%	±%
Progressive Conservative	Frank Drea	10,399	41.15	–7.21
New Democratic	David Gracey	9,362	37.04	+3.62
Liberal	Ross M. Doswell	5,042	19.95	+4.75
Communist	Gareth Blythe	310	1.23	–
Libertarian	Raymond M. Whidden	159	0.63	–
Total valid votes		25,272	99.63	
Total rejected ballots		93	0.37	+0.01
Turnout		25,365	64.04	–9.00
Eligible voters		39,608		
Progressive Conservative hold		Swing		–5.41
Source: Elections Ontario

1971 Ontario general election
Party	Candidate	Votes	%	±%
Progressive Conservative	Frank Drea	15,781	48.36	+9.16
New Democratic	Margaret Renwick	10,908	33.42	–9.58
Liberal	Brian J. Wallace	4,962	15.20	–2.60
Independent	Sydney Brown	984	3.02	–
Total valid votes		32,635	99.65	
Total rejected ballots		116	0.35	–0.09
Turnout		32,751	73.04	+6.58
Eligible voters		44,837		
Progressive Conservative gain from New Democratic		Swing		+9.37
Source: Elections Ontario

1967 Ontario general election
Party	Candidate	Votes	%	±%
New Democratic	Margaret Renwick	10,419	43.00	+7.71
Progressive Conservative	George Peck	9,497	39.20	+1.83
Liberal	Conrad Stewart	4,313	17.80	–9.54
Total valid votes		24,229	99.55	
Total rejected ballots		109	0.45	–0.30
Turnout		24,338	66.46	+6.47
Eligible voters		36,618		
New Democratic gain from Progressive Conservative		Swing		+2.94
Source: Elections Ontario

1963 Ontario general election
Party	Candidate	Votes	%
Progressive Conservative	George Peck	7,264	37.37
New Democratic	E. Kenneth Ranney	6,860	35.29
Liberal	Albert Campbell	5,314	27.34
Total valid votes		19,438	99.25
Total rejected ballots		146	0.75
Turnout		19,584	60.00
Eligible voters		32,641	
Progressive Conservative pickup new district.			
Source: Elections Ontario

== See also ==
- List of Ontario provincial electoral districts
- Canadian provincial electoral districts
