= Steve Gilchrist =

Canadian politician

The Honourable Steve Gilchrist ECO

Ontario MPP
- In office 1995–2003
- Preceded by: Bob Frankford
- Succeeded by: Mary Anne Chambers
- Constituency: Scarborough East

Personal details
- Born: July 7, 1954 (age 72) Toronto, Ontario
- Party: Progressive Conservative
- Education: Queen's University (BCom); University of Toronto (MEnvSc)
- Occupation: Businessman

Steve Gilchrist (born July 7, 1954) is a former politician in Ontario, Canada. He was a Progressive Conservative member of the Legislative Assembly of Ontario from 1995 to 2003 and served as a cabinet minister in the government of Mike Harris.

== Background ==
His father, Gordon Gilchrist, was a Progressive Conservative member of the House of Commons of Canada.

Gilchrist was educated at Queen's University, receiving a Bachelor of Commerce degree in 1975. Prior to entering elected office, he operated a number of Canadian Tire franchise stores from 1971 to 1995, including one of the largest stores in the chain. Gilchrist was involved in several other business ventures, including the construction of a shopping centre (The Town & Country Centre) in Cobourg, Ontario, in 1989, and a family farming operation in Alnwick/Haldimand Township.

== Politics ==
Active in the Ontario Progressive Conservative Party since 1970, Gilchrist first ran for the Ontario legislature in the 1990 provincial election in the riding of Scarborough East, but placed third behind incumbent Liberal Ed Fulton and the winner, New Democrat Bob Frankford. Later that year, he was elected third vice president of the Ontario Progressive Conservative Party. Two years later, he was acclaimed as President of the party and served from 1992 to 1994, succeeding Tony Clement. From 1990 to 1994, Gilchrist hosted various cable television shows on Trillium Cable in Scarborough.

The Tories won a majority government in the 1995 election under Mike Harris. In a rematch from 1990, Gilchrist easily defeated Frankford by almost 12,000 votes, the highest plurality of any Toronto riding. He was immediately elected chair of the Standing Committee on Resources Development and he was named a parliamentary assistant to the Ministry of Municipal Affairs and Housing in 1997.

Gilchrist was re-elected in the 1999 provincial election, defeating Liberal candidate Peter Vanderyagt by about 3,500 votes. On June 17, 1999, Gilchrist was named Minister of Municipal Affairs and Housing but stepped aside to defend himself from allegations by the development industry in October 1999 after he had announced his intention to ban all development on the Oak Ridges Moraine. The allegations were proved to be unfounded, and he was exonerated but was not returned to cabinet. Shortly thereafter, he was appointed as co-chair of the Red Tape Commission and as a Commissioner on the Board of Internal Economy, the all-party committee that oversees the operation of the Ontario Parliament building.

While serving as a cabinet minister, Gilchrist was responsible for co-ordinating the forced amalgamation of municipal governments in Ottawa, Hamilton and Sudbury. The political debate on the future of the Oak Ridges Moraine also began during his tenure. He remained active on the file after his resignation until the passage of the Oak Ridges Moraine Conservation Act in 2001.

Gilchrist was elected as Chair of the Standing Committee on General Government and, on April 25, 2002, he was appointed as parliamentary assistant to the Minister of Energy and Environment.

On June 28, 2001, Gilchrist was put in charge of a Select Committee tasked with the goal of reviewing alternative, i.e. "green", fuel sources. In the same year, he backed Jim Flaherty's unsuccessful bid to succeed Mike Harris as party leader. In 2002, he was appointed as the first Commissioner of Alternative Energy for the province of Ontario, a position he held until December 2003.

During his time in office, Gilchrist introduced many private member's bills which were passed into law, including Bill 20, the Good Samaritans Act of 2001 This act guarantees protects anyone who competently attempts to give first aid or render other medical assistance is protected from any legal liability. In December 2001, Gilchrist's youngest sister underwent a successful heart transplant and, in response to the significant waiting times faced by patients hoping for organ donation, on May 5, 2003, Gilchrist introduced Bill 17, the Organ or Tissue Donation Statute Law Amendment Act, 2003. The bill would have required anyone obtaining a provincial license or health card to complete an organ donation form and would have prevented any other person from overturning the decision of the donor, after death.

Other private member's bill's which were passed into law included Bill 172, the Toronto Hospital Act, 1997, which merged the Toronto Hospital and the Ontario Cancer Institute, at their request; Bill 110, the Professional Foresters Act, 2000; and the Act that created the Ontario Association of Former Parliamentarians, Bill 65, the Ontario Association of Former Parliamentarians Act, 2000. He also introduced Bills which would have raised the minimum smoking age in Ontario, formally designated the August Civic Holiday as "Simcoe Day', prevented the demolition of any buildings designated as "heritage buildings" and one which would have required the paying of Ontario income tax on the benefits received by federal Senators and Members of Parliament. His most notable bill was Bill 17, the Ontario Natural Heritage Act, 2002, which became the basis of the government bill, the Oak Ridges Moraine Conservation Act, 2002, which put in place the long-term protection for the Oak Ridges Moraine.

He lost his seat in the 2003 provincial election, falling to Liberal Mary Anne Chambers by almost 7,000 votes.

In addition to his public activism within the PC Party and as a Member of Provincial Parliament, Gilchrist was very active in the community, serving as a governor of the Central Ontario YMCAs for 11 years; vice-chair of the Rouge Park Alliance; director of the Oak Ridges Moraine Foundation; director of the Oak Ridge Moraine Land Trust; director of the East Scarborough Boys & Girls Club and a member of a number of local ratepayers associations in Scarborough. For over twenty years, Gilchrist annually funded "Gilchrist Science Scholarships" at the University of Toronto Scarborough and various local high schools.

=== Cabinet positions ===
Harris ministry, Province of Ontario (1995–2002)
Cabinet post (1)
Predecessor	Office	Successor
Al Leach	Ministry of Municipal Affairs and Housing; 1999 (June–October)	Tony Clement

== After politics ==
After the election, Gilchrist became involved with a wide range of projects and companies involved in different forms of renewable energy generation. He became the Vice-President of Canadian Hydrogen Energy Company, the world's largest manufacturer of hydrogen-based emissions reduction and fuel saving devices. In 2007, he was elected as a director of the National Hydrogen Association, in Washington, D.C., and has served as a special advisor to the board of Skypower Ltd., one of Canada's largest wind and solar power companies. He also developed a company which has worked with governments in Africa, the Caribbean, South America and Asia to raise awareness of biomass-to-energy power generation opportunities and clean water generation.

From 2001 to 2011, Gilchrist served as a Director and then Vice-President of the Oak Ridges Moraine Land Trust, a volunteer organization whose goal is to place conservation easements over private and publicly held land on the Oak Ridges Moraine. Since 2005, Gilchrist has also served as a director of the Ontario Association of Former Parliamentarians and, in August 2015, he was elected as the Chair of that organization. He has been active in a wide range of media, including serving as the alternate host for Politically Speaking on Rogers Television in Durham Region, a frequent guest of TV shows such as the Michael Coren Show on CTS and a contributor of many newspaper articles dealing with environmental and energy topics. In April 2022, he became the host of the "Naturally Northumberland" radio show on Northumberland 89.7 Radio in Cobourg, Ontario. In May 2022, he was elected to the Board of Directors of the Northumberland County Housing Corporation. In November 2021, Gilchrist graduated with a Master of Environmental Science degree from the University of Toronto where he attended the University of Toronto Scarborough.

In June 2007, Gilchrist was nominated as the Conservative Party of Canada's candidate in Ajax—Pickering for the next federal election. In March 2008, Gilchrist announced that he was stepping down as the candidate in order to return his full attention to his alternative energy business interests, including a proposed waste-to-energy facility in Ghana and an advanced recycling technology for municipalities in Canada.
