= Tim Reid (politician) =

Canadian politician (1936–2025)

Ontario MPP
- In office 1967–1971
- Preceded by: Louis Hodgson
- Succeeded by: Margaret Birch
- Constituency: Scarborough East

Personal details
- Born: Timothy Escott Reid; February 21, 1936 Toronto, Ontario, Canada
- Died: October 9, 2025 (aged 89)
- Party: Liberal
- Spouse: Julyan Fancott (1962–2012; her death)
- Children: 2
- Education: Trinity College, Toronto; Yale University; Christ Church, Oxford
- Occupation: Politician, civil servant, educator

Timothy Escott Reid (February 21, 1936 – October 9, 2025) was a Canadian politician who represented the electoral district of Scarborough East in the Legislative Assembly of Ontario from 1967 to 1971. He was a member of the Ontario Liberal Party.

== Life and career ==
Reid was born in Toronto, Ontario, a son of Canadian diplomat Escott Reid and his wife Ruth (Herriot). He attended the University of Toronto and graduated with a Bachelor of Arts degree. He was a star athlete for the university in athletics and football, setting the league scoring record (68 points) playing halfback for the football team in 1958, and in 1993 he was inducted into the university's Sports Hall of Fame. He received an M.A. in economics from Yale University in 1960 and was selected as a Rhodes scholar that year to attend Oxford University. He returned to Canada from Oxford in 1962 and completed his Oxford M.Litt. thesis studying the policies of James Coyne in 1965. Upon returning to Canada, he was selected by the Hamilton Tiger Cats in the Canadian Football League and played in the infamous 1962 50th Grey Cup game known as the "Fog Bowl". In the fall of 1962, he was hired by the University of Toronto as an instructor in Canadian economic history. In 1963, he became the assistant to the president of York University and an assistant professor of economics at York University. During his time as a faculty member at York University, he was editor of the books Contemporary Canada: Readings in Economics (1969) and, with his wife Julyan Reid, Student Power and the Canadian Campus (1969).

In 1962, Reid met and married Julyan Fancott whilst he was at Oxford and she at the London School of Economics. They had two children and were married for 50 years until her death in 2012. Reid died on October 9, 2025, at the age of 89.

=== Politics ===
In 1965 he ran as the federal Liberal candidate in the Toronto riding of Danforth in 1965 but finished second behind New Democrat Reid Scott. He then successfully campaigned in the 1967 Ontario general election, winning the riding of Scarborough East. He served as a member of five standing committees during the 28th Legislative Assembly of Ontario and as the Critic for Education and University Affairs. In early 1968, Reid was instrumental in forming a "Draft Pierre Trudeau for Prime Minister" committee and worked to build support in Ontario for Trudeau's successful run for the leadership of the Liberal Party of Canada. In the 1971 general election, Reid lost to PC candidate Margaret Birch by 670 votes.

=== Later life ===
After his defeat in the 1971 general election, Reid took a position with the OECD in Paris as a principal administrator in the Manpower and Social Affairs Directorate. In 1974, he returned to Canada and took a position in the federal civil service as the director of the Treasury Board's Planning Branch. Reid held increasingly senior positions, in a variety of federal Departments, culminating in terms as assistant deputy minister at the Departments of Regional Economic Expansion, Industry, and Tourism.

In 1985, Reid was appointed dean of the School of Business Management at Ryerson Polytechnical Institute in Toronto. While in that position, he also served as a member of the executive committee of the Institute of Public Administration of Canada (IPAC) and he served, for one term, as a part-time commissioner of the Ontario Securities Commission.

From 1989 to 1998, Reid was the president of the 170,000-member Canadian Chamber of Commerce, Canada's largest and most representative national business association. In this position, he played a role in the public debate over the federal budget deficit, and the potential economic impact of the 1995 Quebec referendum on separation.

Reid served on many boards of directors, including VIA Rail Canada from 2000 to 2006, and as an alumni governor on the governing council of the University of Toronto from 2002 to 2011.
