= Dan Newman =

Canadian politician (1963–2026)

The Honourable Dan Newman

Ontario MPP
- In office 1999–2003
- Preceded by: New riding
- Succeeded by: Lorenzo Berardinetti
- Constituency: Scarborough Southwest
- In office 1995–1999
- Preceded by: Steve Owens
- Succeeded by: Marilyn Mushinski
- Constituency: Scarborough Centre

Personal details
- Born: January 16, 1963 Toronto, Ontario, Canada
- Died: May 21, 2026 (aged 63)
- Party: Progressive Conservative
- Occupation: Newspaper manager

Daniel Victor Newman (January 16, 1963 – May 21, 2026) was a Canadian politician in Ontario. He was a Progressive Conservative member of the Legislative Assembly of Ontario from 1995 to 2003, and was a cabinet minister in the governments of Mike Harris and Ernie Eves.

== Background ==
Newman was educated at University College at the University of Toronto, receiving a Bachelor of Arts degree in 1987. From 1985 to 1995, he worked as manager of the Toronto Sun Publishing Corporation. Newman also served as President of the Scarborough PC Association in 1992–93.

Newman died on May 21, 2026, at the age of 63.

== Politics ==
Newman was elected to the Ontario legislature in the provincial election of 1995, defeating Liberal Mary Anne Plimbett and incumbent New Democrat Steve Owens in the riding of Scarborough Centre. The Tories won a majority government and Newman served as a backbench supporter of Mike Harris's government.

He was re-elected in the provincial election of 1999, defeating Liberal candidate Adrian Heaps and New Democrat Michael Yorke in the re-distributed riding of Scarborough Southwest.

On March 3, 2000, Newman was appointed to cabinet as Minister of the Environment. This appointment occurred just before a serious outbreak of E. coli poisoning in Walkerton, Ontario, in which several people died following the contamination of the town's water supply. Many blamed the Harris government's privatization of water inspection for the tragedy.

Newman, as Environment Minister, bore the brunt of this criticism and was forced to defend his government's policies before an increasingly skeptical public. In the aftermath of the tragedy, he announced a public investigation and stricter standards for municipal water treatment.

On February 8, 2001, Newman was appointed Minister of Northern Development and Mines. When Ernie Eves replaced Harris as Premier on April 15, 2002, he named Newman as Associate Minister of Health and Long-Term Care.

He was defeated in the 2003 provincial election, losing to Liberal Lorenzo Berardinetti by almost 6,000 votes. He would later donate to Berardinetti after the latter became homeless.

=== Cabinet positions ===
Eves ministry, Province of Ontario (2002–2003)
Cabinet post (1)
Predecessor	Office	Successor
Helen Johns	Associate Minister of Health and Long-Term Care; 2002–2003	Position discontinued
Harris ministry, Province of Ontario (1995–2002)
Cabinet posts (2)
Predecessor	Office	Successor
Tim Hudak	Minister of Northern Development and Mines; 2001–2002	Jim Wilson
Tony Clement	Minister of the Environment; 2000–2001	Elizabeth Witmer
