= Marilyn Mushinski =

Canadian politician (born c.1946)

The Honourable Marilyn Mushinski ECO

Ontario MPP
- In office 1999–2003
- Preceded by: Dan Newman
- Succeeded by: Brad Duguid
- Constituency: Scarborough Centre
- In office 1995–1999
- Preceded by: David Warner
- Succeeded by: Riding abolished
- Constituency: Scarborough—Ellesmere

Alderman, Ward 5, City of Scarborough, Ontario
- In office 1982–1994
- Preceded by: Frank Faubert
- Succeeded by: Brad Duguid

Personal details
- Born: 1946 (age 79–80) England
- Party: Progressive Conservative
- Spouse: Paul Mushinski (divorced)

Marilyn Mushinski (born c. 1946) is a former politician in Ontario, Canada. She was an alderman (councillor) for the city of Scarborough, Ontario from 1982 to 1994 and she served as a Progressive Conservative member of the Legislative Assembly of Ontario from 1995 to 2003. From 1995 to 1997 she was a cabinet minister under Mike Harris.

== Background ==
Born in England, Mushinski emigrated to Canada in 1967 at age twenty-one, and was educated at York University. She worked with the Canadian Mental Health Association before entering political life.

She was married to Paul Mushinski JP, but are now divorced.

== Politics ==
=== Municipal ===
She served as an alderman and councillor in Scarborough, Ontario from 1982 to 1994, and was also a councillor for Metro Toronto in 1987-88. Mushinski also served as a board member of the Scarborough General Hospital and the Scarborough Women's Centre.

In 1986, Mushinski argued, albeit unsuccessfully, to retain the title alderman rather than switch to the gender neutral term councillor. She said, "My gut reaction is one of dismay because I don't know if they've ever taken into consideration the historical significance of the word alderman. I think it trivializes the language and I'm concerned to have to accommodate the quirks of a feminist movement which is trying to bastardize the English language."

In 1994, she ran for mayor of Scarborough against fellow councillors Frank Faubert and Maureen Prinsloo. Mushinski's campaign which was similar to those of her colleagues was based on freezing property taxes and increasing the police force to fight rising crime in the city. During the election, a group called the Scarborough Volunteer Citizens' Budget Advisory Committee rated the candidates. They gave Mushinski a score of 0 out of 100; Faubert was given a score of 50 out of 100. Faubert defeated Mushinski by a margin of 30,844 votes.

=== Provincial ===
Mushinski was elected to the Ontario legislature in the provincial election of 1995, defeating incumbent New Democratic Party of Ontario David Warner by about 4,000 votes in the riding of Scarborough—Ellesmere. On June 26, 1995, she was named as Ontario's Minister of Citizenship, Culture and Recreation.

In 1995, shortly after the election, Mushinski moved to repeal the employment equity law introduced by the previous NDP government. She said, "legislated hiring and promotion quotas are unnecessary, unfair and ineffective."

In 1997, Mushinski issued a press release denouncing a gangland style shooting in her riding in which two Tamil men were injured. She said, "The Canadian tradition of consultation, co-operation and compromise seems to be lost on these individuals. Canada's strength lies in its long-held belief that immigrants to this country are starting fresh, and should embrace a new openness to diversity and respect for the law of the land." Scarborough Mayor Frank Faubert said the release went too far. He called the statement, "a smear on the entire Tamil community."

During a cabinet shuffle later that year she was dropped from cabinet. There was some speculation that although culture was part of her portfolio she had made few friends in the arts community. In 1998 she was made Parliamentary Assistant to the Premier.

In the provincial election of 1999, Mushinski was re-elected by about 4,000 votes over Liberal candidate Costas Manios; NDP candidate and labour leader Sid Ryan was third. During this term she served as Parliamentary Assistant to both the Premier and the Minister of Training, Colleges and Universities.

In May 2000, Mushinski introduced a private members' bill called the Judicial Accountability Act. The bill called for the publication of judges' sentencing records. It would have created a list of sentences imposed by judges and their reasons for not awarding the maximum possible sentence. Upon introduction of the bill she said she wanted to "motivate lenient judges to give out tougher sentences." She warned that judges that didn't play along with this goal might be subject to performance reviews. The bill was opposed by the Criminal Lawyer's Association. Alan Gold, president of the association said, "It's a blatant attack on the independence of the judiciary, it's an attempt to intimidate judges into imposing higher sentences and that's simply inexcusable." Attorney General Jim Flaherty initially was supportive of the bill. He said, "I think the public is entitled to know what sentences are being handed down by judges." But after considerable opposition from the legal community he distanced himself from the legislation. The bill died on the order paper when the legislature recessed for the summer.

In the 2003 provincial election, she was defeated by Liberal candidate Brad Duguid by 10,012 votes.

=== Cabinet positions ===
Harris ministry, Province of Ontario (1995–2002)
Cabinet post (1)
Predecessor	Office	Successor
Elaine Ziemba	Minister of Citizenship, Culture and Recreation; 1995–1997	Isabel Bassett
