= Steve Owens (Canadian politician) =

Canadian politician

Ontario MPP
- In office 1990–1995
- Preceded by: Cindy Nicholas
- Succeeded by: Dan Newman
- Constituency: Scarborough Centre

Personal details
- Born: September 21, 1956 Toronto, Ontario
- Died: July 8, 2016 (aged 59) Toronto, Ontario
- Party: New Democrat
- Spouse: Joanne
- Occupation: Hospital worker, Union executive
- Portfolio: Minister without portfolio, (1994-1995) Responsible for Education and Training

Stephen David Owens (September 21, 1956 – July 8, 2016) was a politician from Ontario, Canada. He was a New Democratic member of the Legislative Assembly of Ontario from 1990 to 1995 who represented the Toronto riding of Scarborough Centre. He served as a cabinet minister in the government of Bob Rae.

== Background ==
Owens held a General Arts and Science Certificate, and worked as a hospital orderly at Toronto General Hospital. He served as president and vice-president of Canadian Union of Public Employees Local 2001, and was a member of the Royal Canadian Legion.

== Politics ==
In 1990, he ran as the New Democratic Party candidate in the 1990 provincial election, defeating Liberal incumbent Cindy Nicholas by 4,162 votes in the riding of Scarborough Centre. The NDP won a majority government and Owens was appointed as parliamentary assistant to the Minister of Correctional Services. Later he served as a parliamentary assistant to the Minister of Finance. On October 21, 1994, he was appointed as a Minister without portfolio responsible for Education and Training, serving as an assistant to Education Minister Dave Cooke.

During his tenure as MPP he also served as party whip and caucus chair.

The NDP were defeated in the 1995 provincial election, and Owens finished third against Progressive Conservative Dan Newman in his bid for re-election. In 2003, he supported Bill Blaikie for the leadership of the federal New Democratic Party.

=== Electoral record ===
1990 Ontario general election
| Party | Candidate | Votes | % | ±% |
|---|---|---|---|---|
| New Democratic | Steve Owens | 13,401 | 47.3 | |
| Liberal | Cindy Nicholas | 9,239 | 32.5 | |
| Progressive Conservative | Joe Trontadus | 5,713 | 20.1 | |
| Total valid votes | | 28,353 | 100.0 | |
Toronto Star.

1995 Ontario general election
| Party | Candidate | Votes | % | ±% |
|---|---|---|---|---|
| Progressive Conservative | Dan Newman | 12,717 | 45.87 | |
| Liberal | Mary Ellen Pimblett | 7,163 | 25.84 | |
| New Democratic | Steve Owens | 6,841 | 24.67 | |
| Independent | John Brereton | 649 | 2.34 | |
| Natural Law | Eleanor Hyodo | 349 | 1.25 | |
| Total valid votes | | 28,079 | 100.0 | |
Elections Ontario.

== After politics ==
Owens worked for ACCES Employment Services finding professional work for new immigrants. He volunteered for the Toronto International Film Festival and in May 2016 was given an Ontario Volunteer Service Award.
