= Christina Mitas =

Canadian politician

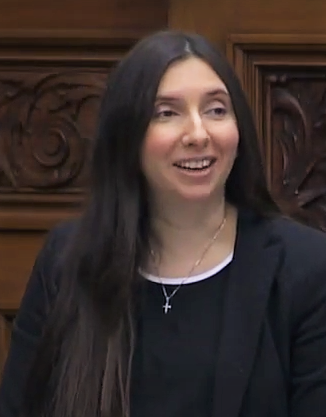
- Ontario MPP Christina Mitas speaking during Members' Statements on November 28, 2019.

President of the Conservative Party of Canada
- Incumbent
- Assumed office February 2, 2026
- Leader: Pierre Poilievre
- Preceded by: Stephen Barber

Member of the Ontario Provincial Parliament for Scarborough Centre
- In office June 7, 2018 – May 3, 2022
- Preceded by: Brad Duguid
- Succeeded by: David Smith

Personal details
- Party: Progressive Conservative Party of Ontario
- Other political affiliations: Conservative Party of Canada
- Education: Ontario Institute for Studies in Education
- Occupation: Teacher, political organizer, politician

Christina Maria Mitas is a Canadian politician and political organizer who has served as the president of Conservative Party of Canada since 2026. She previously represented the riding of Scarborough Centre as a member of the Progressive Conservative Party of Ontario in the Legislative Assembly of Ontario, elected in the 2018 provincial election.

Before politics, Mitas worked as a teacher abroad and was President of the Ontario Institute for Studies in Education Alumni Association.

As an MPP, Mitas served on the Legislative Assembly Standing Committees on Estimates, Public Accounts, and the Legislative Assembly. As part of a province-wide effort, Education Minister Stephen Lecce also named MPP Mitas as his advisor on strategies to fight bullying – in the role Mitas was tasked with speaking with students, parents, teachers and experts.

Mitas received attention for the introduction of Bill 39, the Change of Name Amendment Act, which, if passed, would ban people on Ontario's sex offender registry from changing their names.

In May 2019, Mitas participated in a pro-life rally at Queen's Park hosted by March for Life, where she made a stage appearance.

In August 2021, Mitas was identified as one of only two Ontario PC MPPs to have not received COVID-19 vaccinations. She was able to avoid expulsion from the PC caucus by producing a medical exemption letter from a physician. She did not seek re-election in the 2022 provincial election.

In September 2023, Mitas was elected as an Ontario representative to the Conservative Party of Canada National Council and was subsequently selected to be a vice-president of the party. She was then elected to president of the party in 2026, becoming the first woman to hold the position.

== Electoral record ==
2018 Ontario general election: Scarborough Centre
Party	Candidate	Votes	%	±%
Progressive Conservative	Christina Mitas	15,266	38.45	+16.86
New Democratic	Zeyd Bismilla	13,247	33.36	+13.00
Liberal	Mazhar Shafiq	8,791	22.14	-32.80
Libertarian	Matt Dougherty	1,040	2.62	+1.93
Green	Sanjin Zeco	919	2.31	-0.79
Trillium	Chris Mellor	441	1.11	
Total valid votes		39,704	100.0	
Total rejected, unmarked and declined ballots				
Turnout			54.13	
Eligible voters		73,345		
Progressive Conservative gain from Liberal		Swing		+1.93
Source: Elections Ontario
