= Red Tape Commission =

Former Canadian government agency to reduce regulations

The Red Tape Commission was a Canadian body created by the Progressive Conservative government in Ontario in 1996 to deal with the 1995 election commitment to reduce red tape (excessive bureaucracy and regulation) for small businesses and individuals and to promote business planning within the broader public sector. It consisted of seven Progressive Conservative Members of Provincial Parliament and six staff members drawn from the Ontario civil service.

In addition to annual reviews of all regulations administered by every Ministry of the government, the Commission also initiated specific policy reviews, such as a "Highway Incident Management Study" in 2002, which sought to develop better co-ordination of emergency services dealing with highway accidents.

== History ==
Originally established as a temporary body, the Commission was re-constituted in 2000 as a permanent body, co-chaired by Frank Sheehan and Bob Wood. In early 2001, Steve Gilchrist replaced Wood as co-chair. In December 2003, the newly elected Liberal government discontinued the Commission.
