= Dick Sutton =

Canadian politician

Ontario MPP
- In office 1955–1963
- Preceded by: New Riding
- Succeeded by: Riding abolished
- Constituency: York—Scarborough

Personal details
- Born: March 31, 1901; Lindsay, Ontario
- Died: 1982 (aged 80–81)
- Political party: Progressive Conservative
- Spouse: Margherita May Hodgson (m. 1943)

Richard Edward Victor Sutton (March 31, 1901 - 1982) was a Canadian politician, who represented York—Scarborough in the Legislative Assembly of Ontario from 1955 to 1963 as a Progressive Conservative member.

== Background ==
Sutton was born in Lindsay, Ontario to James L. Lindsay and Lila Edwards. Sutton was married, in 1943, to Margherita May Hodgson (1900 - 1985), who, in turn, was related to three other Members of Provincial Parliament, Ronald Glen Hodgson, Louis Hodgson and Chris Hodgson.

== Politics ==
Sutton was elected in the newly created riding of York-Scarborough, which comprised all of Scarborough Township, Ontario, twice defeating the Liberal candidate, Scarborough reeve Oliver E. Crockford. The population of the Township increased so much, between 1955 and 1963, that it was further subdivided in four ridings for the 1963 provincial general election, making Sutton the only MPP to ever represent the riding. He served as a backbench member of a succession of PC majority governments led by Premiers Leslie Frost and then John Robarts. He did not serve in Cabinet, but he was a member of up to ten Standing Committees of the Legislative Assembly, simultaneously, with a particular interest in committees dealing with municipal law, agriculture, education and conservation.
