= David Smith (Scarborough MPP) =

Canadian politician

David Smith MPP
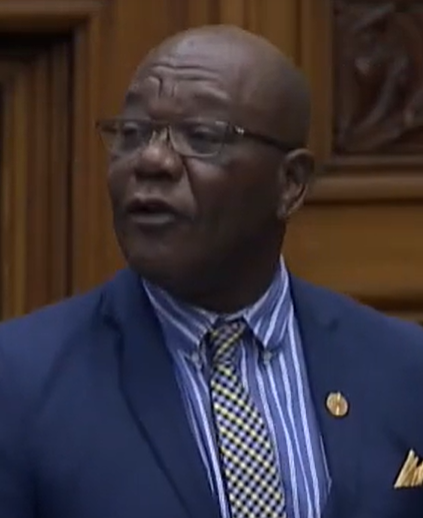
- Smith in 2023

Member of the Ontario Provincial Parliament for Scarborough Centre
- Incumbent
- Assumed office June 2, 2022
- Preceded by: Christina Mitas

Toronto Public School Trustee for (Ward 19/17) Scarborough Centre
- In office December 1, 2014 – June 22, 2022
- Preceded by: Scott Harrison
- Succeeded by: Neethan Shan

Personal details
- Party: Progressive Conservative

David Smith MPP is a Canadian politician, who was elected to the Legislative Assembly of Ontario in the 2022 provincial election. He represents the riding of Scarborough Centre as a member of the Progressive Conservative Party of Ontario.

Smith was previously a trustee with the Toronto District School Board.

== Electoral history ==
2025 Ontario general election: Scarborough Centre
Party	Candidate	Votes	%	±%
Progressive Conservative	David Smith	13,363	44.03	+8.04
Liberal	Mazhar Shafiq	12,839	42.31	+11.94
New Democratic	Sonali Chakraborti	2,628	8.66	–17.57
Green	Dean Boulding	918	3.02	+0.22
New Blue	Gus Prokos	379	1.25	+0.14
Centrist	Haseeb Qureshi	211	0.73	N/A
Total valid votes/expense limit		30,348	98.99	–0.23
Total rejected, unmarked, and declined ballots		310	1.01	+0.23
Turnout		30,658	38.81	–2.44
Eligible voters		79,005		
Progressive Conservative hold		Swing		–1.95
Source: Elections Ontario

2022 Ontario general election: Scarborough Centre
Party	Candidate	Votes	%	±%	Expenditures
Progressive Conservative	David Smith	11,471	35.99	-2.46	$20,592
Liberal	Mazhar Shafiq	9,678	30.37	+8.23	$96,601
New Democratic	Neethan Shan	8,358	26.23	-7.14	$79,499
Green	Fatima Faruq	892	2.80	+0.48	$381
Libertarian	Serge Korovitsyn	392	1.23	-1.39	$84
New Blue	Hidie Jaber	355	1.11		$1,292
Ontario Party	Raphael Rosch	297	0.93		$887
Independent	Kostadinos Stefanis	196	0.62		$0
Independent	Paul Beatty	156	0.49		$579
Moderate	Maria Tzvetanova	74	0.23		$0
Total valid votes/expense limit		31,869	99.22	+0.33	$109,001
Total rejected, unmarked, and declined ballots		251	0.78	−0.33	
Turnout		32,120	41.25	−11.94	
Eligible voters		77,114			
Progressive Conservative hold		Swing		−5.34	
Source(s): "Summary of Valid Votes Cast for Each Candidate" (PDF). Elections Ontario. 2022. Archived from the original on 2023-05-18.; "Statistical Summary by Electoral District" (PDF). Elections Ontario. 2022. Archived from the original on 2023-05-21.
