= Cindy Nicholas =

Canadian swimmer and politician

Cindy Nicholas CM

Ontario MPP
- In office 1987–1990
- Preceded by: William C. Davis
- Succeeded by: Steve Owens
- Constituency: Scarborough Centre

Personal details
- Born: August 20, 1957 Toronto, Ontario, Canada
- Died: May 19, 2016 (aged 58) Toronto, Ontario, Canada
- Party: Liberal
- Spouse: Ray LeGrow
- Children: Leahanne LeGrow
- Occupation: Lawyer

Cynthia Maria "Cindy" Nicholas, CM (August 20, 1957 – May 19, 2016) was a long distance swimmer and a politician in Ontario, Canada. In 1977, she became the first woman to complete a two-way crossing of the English Channel. From 1987 to 1990 she was a Liberal member of the Legislative Assembly of Ontario.

== Background ==
Nicholas was educated at the University of Toronto and the University of Windsor. She worked as a lawyer in Scarborough, Ontario. She had a daughter. She died from liver cancer on May 19, 2016.

== Swimming ==
At age 16, she attained provincial fame by swimming across Lake Ontario in 15 hours and 10 minutes. She later swam across the English Channel on 19 occasions, including the first two-way crossing by a woman. She completed a record five two-way crossings including two in one year, earning her the sobriquet Queen of the Channel. She was named top female athlete of the year in 1977 and given the Bobbie Rosenfeld Award. In 1979, she was made a Member of the Order of Canada. In 1993, she was inducted into Canada's Sports Hall of Fame and into the International Swimming Hall of Fame in 2005. She was inducted into the Ontario Sports Hall of Fame in 2003.

Two-way Channel swims

1977 - 19 h 55 min (breaking Jon Erikson's record of 30 hours, and the first ever two-way crossing by a woman)
1979 - 19 h 12 min
1981 - 22 h 21 min
1982 - 18 h 55 min
1982 - 20 h 09 min

== Politics ==
She was elected to the Ontario legislature in the 1987 provincial election to represent the east Toronto riding of Scarborough Centre, defeating New Democratic Party candidate Menno Vorster by 3,396 votes. For the next three years, Nicholas served as a backbench supporter of David Peterson's government. She was parliamentary assistant to the Solicitor General from 1989 to 1990.

The Liberals were defeated by the NDP in the 1990 provincial election and Nicholas lost her seat to NDP candidate Steve Owens by 3,068 votes. She returned to her legal practice in the Toronto district of Scarborough.

== See also ==
- List of members of the International Swimming Hall of Fame
