= Scarborough East (provincial electoral district) =

Former provincial electoral district in Ontario, Canada

Ontario electoral district

Defunct provincial electoral district
- Legislature: Legislative Assembly of Ontario
- District created: 1963
- District abolished: 2007
- First contested: 1963
- Last contested: 2003

Demographics
- Census division: Toronto
- Census subdivision: Toronto

Scarborough East was a provincial electoral riding in Ontario, Canada. It was created prior to the 1963 provincial election and eliminated in 1996, when most of its territory was incorporated into the riding of Pickering—Scarborough East. Scarborough East riding was created from part of the former riding of York—Scarborough. It was in the former borough of Scarborough.

Seven Members of Provincial Parliament represented the riding during its history. Liberals Ed Fulton and Mary Anne Chambers and Conservatives Margaret Birch and Steve Gilchrist were all members of cabinet in their respective times.

== Boundaries ==
The riding was created in 1963 through an amendment to the Representation Act. It formed the eastern part of the former riding of York—Scarborough. The riding encompassed all of Scarborough to the east of Markham Road from Lake Ontario to the south and Steeles Avenue to the north.

In 1975 was reduced to about half its 1963 territory. With the southern edge as Lake Ontario, The boundaries were as follows: it went north on Markham Road to the CNR right-of-way. It followed the tracks east to Scarborough Golf Club Road, north along this road to Ellesmere Road, west along this road back to Markham Road. It continued north along Markham Road to Highway 401. It then turned east following the highway which constituted the northern boundary to the city limits and then south along the Rouge River back to the lake.

The boundaries were changed slightly in 1987. Highway 401, the Rouge River and Lake Ontario still served as the north, east and south borders respectively. The western border was changed as follows. Starting at the lake it headed north on Markham Road to Lawrence Avenue. It then followed Lawrence east until it met a tributary to Highland Creek. It followed the tributary northeast until it met another part of Highland Creek. It then followed this branch northwest until Highway 401. It then continued east on Highway 401 as per the 1975 boundary.

== Members of Provincial Parliament ==
Scarborough East
Assembly	Years	Member	Party
Created from York—Scarborough in 1963
27th	1963–1967	Louis Hodgson	Progressive Conservative
28th	1967–1971	Tim Reid	Liberal
29th	1971–1975	Margaret Birch	Progressive Conservative
30th	1975–1977	Margaret Birch	Progressive Conservative
31st	1977–1981	Margaret Birch	Progressive Conservative
32nd	1981–1985	Margaret Birch	Progressive Conservative
33rd	1985–1987	Ed Fulton	Liberal
34th	1987–1990	Ed Fulton	Liberal
35th	1990–1995	Bob Frankford	New Democratic
36th	1995–1999	Steve Gilchrist	Progressive Conservative
37th	1999–2003	Steve Gilchrist	Progressive Conservative
38th	2003–2007	Mary Anne Chambers	Liberal
Sourced from the Ontario Legislative Assembly
Merged into Pickering—Scarborough East and Scarborough—Guildwood after 2007

== Electoral results ==
=== 1998 electoral boundaries ===
2003 Ontario general election
Party	Candidate	Votes	%	±%
Liberal	Mary Anne Chambers	21,798	51.50	+10.62
Progressive Conservative	Steve Gilchrist	14,323	33.84	–15.66
New Democratic	Gary Dale	5,250	12.40	+5.58
Green	Hugh McNeil	668	1.58	–
Libertarian	Sam Apelbaum	285	0.67	–0.21
Total valid votes		42,324	99.37	
Total rejected, unmarked and declined ballots		268	0.63	–0.55
Turnout		42,592	59.21	–0.23
Eligible voters		71,930		
Liberal gain from Progressive Conservative		Swing		+13.14
Source: Elections Ontario

1999 Ontario general election
Party	Candidate	Votes	%	±%
Progressive Conservative	Steve Gilchrist	20,686	49.50	–6.22
Liberal	Peter Vanderyagt	17,084	40.88	+19.96
New Democratic	Terry Maley	2,853	6.83	–14.14
Family Coalition	Catherine Fox	457	1.09	–
Libertarian	Sam Apelbaum	368	0.88	–0.05
Independent	Heath Thomas	205	0.49	–
Natural Law	Loucas Café	135	0.32	–0.36
Total valid votes		41,788	98.82	
Total rejected, unmarked and declined ballots		497	1.18	+0.10
Turnout		42,285	59.45	–5.25
Eligible voters		71,131		
Progressive Conservative hold		Swing		–13.09
Source: Elections Ontario

=== 1987 electoral boundaries ===
1995 Ontario general election
Party	Candidate	Votes	%	±%
Progressive Conservative	Steve Gilchrist	19,166	55.72	+25.67
New Democratic	Bob Frankford	7,212	20.97	–14.58
Liberal	Bhagat Taggar	7,197	20.92	–9.23
Libertarian	Sam Apelbaum	319	0.93	–0.83
Independent	Neville Berry	270	0.78	–
Natural Law	Jim Hill	234	0.68	–
Total valid votes		34,398	98.92	
Total rejected, unmarked and declined ballots		375	1.08	–0.27
Turnout		34,773	64.69	+1.22
Eligible voters		53,750		
Progressive Conservative gain from New Democratic		Swing		+20.13
Source: Elections Ontario

1990 Ontario general election
Party	Candidate	Votes	%	±%
New Democratic	Bob Frankford	11,700	35.55	+12.50
Liberal	Ed Fulton	9,926	30.16	–25.24
Progressive Conservative	Steve Gilchrist	9,890	30.05	+12.43
Libertarian	Jim McIntosh	577	1.75	–1.09
Green	Cara Mumford	454	1.38	+0.28
Independent	Darryl B. McDowell	368	1.12	–
Total valid votes		32,915	98.65	
Total rejected, unmarked and declined ballots		451	1.35	+0.57
Turnout		33,366	63.47	+4.38
Eligible voters		52,570		
New Democratic gain from Liberal		Swing		+18.87
Source: Elections Ontario

1987 Ontario general election
Party	Candidate	Votes	%	±%
Liberal	Ed Fulton	16,944	55.39	+7.18
New Democratic	Mary Cook	7,048	23.04	+9.72
Progressive Conservative	Russ Bastow	5,390	17.62	–16.58
Libertarian	Jim McIntosh	869	2.84	–1.42
Green	Greg Knittl	337	1.10	–
Total valid votes		30,588	99.22	
Total rejected ballots		241	0.78	+0.27
Turnout		30,829	59.09	+0.92
Eligible voters		52,171		
Liberal hold		Swing		–1.27
Source: Elections Ontario

=== 1975 electoral boundaries ===
1985 Ontario general election
Party	Candidate	Votes	%	±%
Liberal	Ed Fulton	15,855	48.22	+23.25
Progressive Conservative	Verla Fiveash	11,245	34.20	–21.83
New Democratic	Alawi Mohideen	4,381	13.32	–3.18
Libertarian	Jim McIntosh	1,402	4.26	+2.34
Total valid votes		32,883	99.49	
Total rejected ballots		168	0.51	–0.06
Turnout		33,051	58.18	+2.80
Eligible voters		56,812		
Liberal gain from Progressive Conservative		Swing		+22.54
Source: Elections Ontario

1981 Ontario general election
Party	Candidate	Votes	%	±%
Progressive Conservative	Margaret Birch	16,386	56.03	+5.12
Liberal	Charles Beer	7,301	24.96	+2.57
New Democratic	Gordon Wilson	4,826	16.50	–8.51
Libertarian	Jim McIntosh	562	1.92	+0.24
Independent	Jeff Nelles	171	0.58	–
Total valid votes		29,246	99.43	
Total rejected ballots		167	0.57	+0.24
Turnout		29,413	55.38	–7.55
Eligible voters		53,113		
Progressive Conservative hold		Swing		+1.28
Source: Elections Ontario

1977 Ontario general election
Party	Candidate	Votes	%	±%
Progressive Conservative	Margaret Birch	14,792	50.91	+8.31
New Democratic	Ann Marie Hill	7,268	25.01	–1.43
Liberal	Ron Myatt	6,508	22.40	–7.28
Libertarian	John A. White	489	1.68	+0.39
Total valid votes		29,057	99.67	
Total rejected ballots		97	0.33	–0.00
Turnout		29,154	62.92	–3.93
Eligible voters		46,332		
Progressive Conservative hold		Swing		+4.87
Source: Elections Ontario

1975 Ontario general election
Party	Candidate	Votes	%	±%
Progressive Conservative	Margaret Birch	12,645	42.59	+1.65
Liberal	John Coates	8,809	29.67	–9.19
New Democratic	Ann Marie Hill	7,850	26.44	+6.25
Libertarian	David Tootill	383	1.29	–
Total valid votes		29,687	99.66	
Total rejected ballots		100	0.34	+0.08
Turnout		29,787	66.86	–6.65
Eligible voters		44,552		
Progressive Conservative hold		Swing		+5.42
Source: Elections Ontario

=== 1963 electoral boundaries ===
1971 Ontario general election
Party	Candidate	Votes	%	±%
Progressive Conservative	Margaret Birch	13,206	40.94	+7.89
Liberal	Tim Reid	12,536	38.86	+4.66
New Democratic	Sean Regan	6,514	20.19	–12.55
Total valid votes		32,256	99.74	
Total rejected ballots		83	0.26	–0.04
Turnout		32,339	73.51	+5.84
Eligible voters		43,994		
Progressive Conservative gain from Liberal		Swing		+1.61
Source: Elections Ontario

1967 Ontario general election
Party	Candidate	Votes	%	±%
Liberal	Tim Reid	6,538	34.20	+3.29
Progressive Conservative	Louis Hodgson	6,318	33.05	–11.30
New Democratic	Jack Ottaway	6,260	32.75	+8.01
Total valid votes		19,116	99.71	
Total rejected ballots		56	0.29	–0.44
Turnout		19,172	67.67	+10.53
Eligible voters		28,333		
Liberal gain from Progressive Conservative		Swing		+7.30
Source: Elections Ontario

1963 Ontario general election
Party	Candidate	Votes	%
Progressive Conservative	Louis Hodgson	5,623	44.35
Liberal	John M. Drysdale	3,919	30.91
New Democratic	Harry Schofield	3,137	24.74
Total valid votes		12,679	99.27
Total rejected ballots		93	0.73
Turnout		12,772	57.14
Eligible voters		22,353	
Progressive Conservative pickup new district.			
Source: Elections Ontario

== See also ==
- List of Ontario provincial electoral districts
- Canadian provincial electoral districts
