= Escott Reid =

Canadian diplomat (1905–1999)

Escott Meredith Reid CC
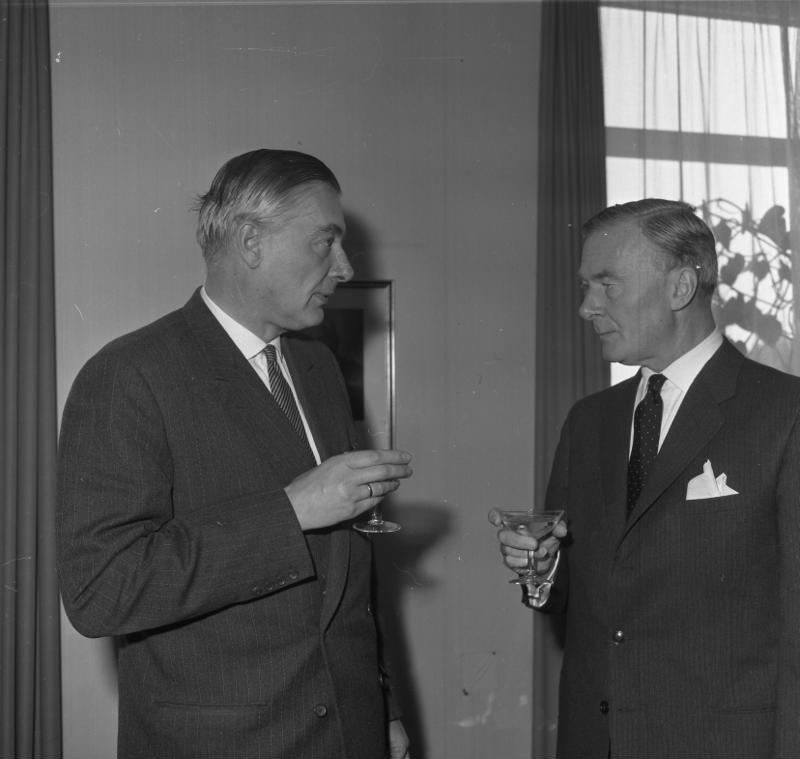

Deputy Under-Secretary for External Affairs (Canada)

Personal details
- Born: January 21, 1905 Campbellford, Ontario, Canada
- Died: September 28, 1999 (aged 94) Ottawa, Ontario, Canada
- Spouse: Ruth Herriot
- Children: Patrick Reid, Morna Reid, Tim Reid
- Education: Trinity College, Toronto; Christ Church, Oxford
- Occupation: Diplomat and university administrator

Escott Graves Meredith Reid, CC (January 21, 1905 – September 28, 1999), was a Canadian diplomat who helped shape the United Nations and NATO, author, international public servant and academic administrator.

== Early life and education ==
Born in Campbellford, Ontario, he was the son of Shropshire native and Anglican minister Rev. Alfred John Reid (1861–1957) and his wife Morna Irvine Meredith (1871–1962), the youngest daughter of Edmund Allen Meredith and a god-daughter of George Irvine. His Meredith grandfather had served as Deputy Under-Secretary of Canada, and Reid later occupied his very same offices at Parliament Hill.

He received a Bachelor of Arts degree in political science from Trinity College, in the University of Toronto in 1927. A Rhodes scholar, he received a Bachelor of Arts degree in 1929 and a Master of Arts degree in 1935 from Christ Church, Oxford. Though academic jobs were scarce in 1930, he had won a Rockefeller Fellowship which enabled him to study the Canadian party and electoral systems in general and Saskatchewan's in particular.

At Oxford he had met and married Ruth Herriot, of Winnipeg, and they had three children: Patrick Reid; Morna Reid; and Tim Reid (b. 1936), a Canadian educator, civil servant, and executive.

== Public life and career ==
Turning down a position to teach at Harvard University, from 1932 to 1938, he was the first full-time National Secretary for the Canadian Institute of International Affairs (CIIA), today known as the Canadian International Council (CIC). He was active in the League for Social Reconstruction, an association of left-wing intellectuals founded in Montreal and Toronto in the winter of 1931–1932. He also joined the Cooperative Commonwealth Federation, the new social-democratic political party that took shape in 1932–1933. His left-wing views and his conviction that Canada should maintain neutrality in a renewed European war put him at odds with many CIIA members, and essentially made it necessary for him to find a new career path. From 1937 to 1938, he was the acting Professor of Government and Political Science at Dalhousie University.

In 1939, he joined the Canadian Foreign Service and held positions in Washington, London, San Francisco and Ottawa, working on the creation of the United Nations.

He accompanied Minister of Trade and Commerce James MacKinnon on a tour of Latin America in 1941 which established trade agreements with several nations. From 1946 to 1949 he was Lester B. Pearson's chief aide, and instrumental in devising the idea of a collective security alliance of Western democracies, which culminated in NATO.

In 1947, he was appointed Assistant Under-Secretary for External Affairs and was Deputy Under-Secretary from 1948 to 1952. He was a member of the Canadian delegation to the founding conference of the United Nations in San Francisco in 1945. From 1952 to 1957, he was the High Commissioner for Canada to India and from 1958 to 1962 he was Ambassador to West Germany. From 1962 to 1965, he was Director of the South-Asia and Middle East Department of the World Bank. From 1965 to 1969, he was the first Principal of Glendon College, York University.

== Retirement and legacy ==
Reid spent a large part of his retirement at the farm he and his wife owned at Wakefield, Quebec. From 1973 to 1989 he published seven books, all rooted in his personal experience while dealing with subjects of evident public interest. They included works about the World Bank, the founding of the United Nations, the making of the North Atlantic Treaty, the Hungarian and Suez crises of 1956, his years in India and his friendship with Jawaharlal Nehru, and, finally, his autobiography, 'Radical Mandarin', which is how he referred to himself.

Though he was thought by some to have been 'arrogant, given to excess, and a naïve liberal idealist', Reid's vital contributions helped to shape some of the 20th century's most important international developments. During his service, Canadian diplomacy was at the forefront of the recognised world leaders, a status that declined rapidly after his departure. In 1971, Reid was made a Companion of the Order of Canada "for his services as a diplomat, international public servant and educator". In 1993, he received the Pearson Medal of Peace for his work as a public servant. He died in Ottawa on, September 28, 1999.

== Bibliography ==
- The Future of the World Bank (1965)
- Strengthening the World Bank (1973)
- Time of Fear and Hope: The Making of the North Atlantic Treaty 1947–49 (1977)
- Envoy to Nehru (1981)
- On Duty: A Canadian at the Making of the United Nations, 1945–46 (1983)
- Hungary and Suez 1956: A View From New Delhi (1987)
- Radical Mandarin: The Memoirs of Escott Reid (1989)
