= Bob Frankford =

Canadian doctor and politician (1939–2015)

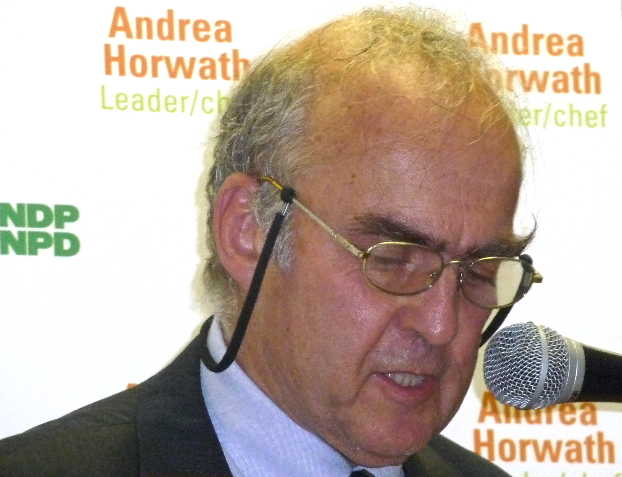

Ontario MPP
- In office 1990–1995
- Preceded by: Ed Fulton
- Succeeded by: Steve Gilchrist
- Constituency: Scarborough East

Personal details
- Born: Robert Timothy Stansfield Frankford; August 1, 1939 Nottingham, England
- Died: August 1, 2015 (aged 76) Toronto, Ontario, Canada
- Party: New Democrat
- Spouse: Helen Breslauer
- Children: 3
- Occupation: Doctor

Robert Timothy Stansfield "Bob" Frankford (August 1, 1939 – August 1, 2015) was a Canadian doctor and politician in Ontario. He was a New Democratic member of the Legislative Assembly of Ontario from 1990 to 1995 who represented the Toronto riding of Scarborough East.

== Early life and education ==
Frankford was born in Nottingham, England, on August 1, 1939. He was educated at the University of London in England and the St. George's Hospital Medical School, and became a family physician before entering political life. He was responsible for inaugurating the first health service organization in Toronto.

== Politics ==
Frankford was elected to the Ontario legislature in the 1990 provincial election, defeating Liberal incumbent Ed Fulton by 1,774 votes in Scarborough East as the New Democratic Party (NDP) won a majority government. He served as a parliamentary assistant from 1990 to 1991. He used his medical training to advocate for sickle-cell disease and other health issues. He resigned in May 1991 because he failed to meet a deadline to divest himself of some investment property in the health industry.

The NDP were defeated in the 1995 provincial election, and Frankford lost his seat to Progressive Conservative candidate Steve Gilchrist by almost 12,000 votes.

He ran for the federal New Democratic Party for the House of Commons of Canada in the 1997 federal election, but finished a distant fourth against Liberal John McKay in Scarborough East. He also attempted to return to the provincial legislature in the 1999 provincial election, but finished third against Liberal Gerry Phillips in Scarborough—Agincourt. Frankford's wife, Helen Breslauer, has also run as a candidate in Toronto Centre but finished 4th.

In August 2009, he sought the NDP nomination for the provincial by-election in the riding of St. Paul's, but was defeated by lawyer Julian Heller.

=== Electoral record ===
1990 Ontario general election
Party	Candidate	Votes	Vote %
New Democrat	Bob Frankford	11,699	35.6
Liberal	Ed Fulton	9,925	30.2
Progressive Conservative	Steve Gilchrist	9,878	30.0
Libertarian	Jim McIntosh	1.8	0.9
Green	Cara Mumford	455	1.4
Independent	Darryl McDowell	367	1.1
	Total	32,901	

1995 Ontario general election
Party	Candidate	Votes	Vote %
Progressive Conservative	Steve Gilchrist	19,166	55.7
New Democrat	Bob Frankford	7,212	21.0
Liberal	Bhagat Taggar	7,197	20.9
Libertarian	Sam Apelbaum	319	0.9
Independent	Neville Berry	270	0.8
Natural Law	Jim Hill	234	0.7
	Total	34,398	

== After politics ==
In 1995 he returned to his medical practice and became a physician at the Seaton House men's hostel, which services many poor and homeless in the city. He was chair of the Ontario Medical Association's section of health service organization physicians.

He remained involved in a number of community projects and organizations, including the Sickle Cell Association of Ontario and the Toronto Pedestrian Committee, and was chair of the Scarborough—Agincourt collaborative committee of the Central East Local Health Integration Network.

== Personal life and death ==
Frankford married Helen Breslauer and raised three daughters.

He died in Toronto on August 1, 2015, at the age of 76. He was honored with a tribute in the Ontario legislature on March 22, 2016.
