= William C. Davis (Canadian politician) =

Canadian politician (1939–2025)

William C. "Bill" Davis (Note: William C. Davis should not be confused with Bill Davis, who served as Premier of Ontario from 1971 to 1985.)

Ontario MPP
- In office 1985–1987
- Preceded by: Frank Drea
- Succeeded by: Cindy Nicholas
- Constituency: Scarborough Centre

Personal details
- Born: September 1, 1939 Toronto, Ontario, Canada
- Died: September 15, 2025 (aged 86)
- Party: Progressive Conservative
- Spouse: Linda (nee Park)
- Profession: Anglican priest

William C. Davis (September 1, 1939 – September 15, 2025) was a Canadian politician. He was a Progressive Conservative member of the Legislative Assembly of Ontario from 1985 to 1987 who represented the riding of Scarborough Centre.

== Background ==
Davis was born in Toronto, Ontario, and educated at York University and the Montreal Diocesan Theological College. He became an Anglican priest, and was chair of the Scarborough Board of Education.

Davis died on September 15, 2025, at the age of 86.

== Politics ==
Davis was elected to the Ontario legislature in the 1985 provincial election, defeating Liberal candidate Gerald Lennon by 359 votes in Scarborough Centre. The Progressive Conservatives won a narrow plurality of seats in this election, and Davis briefly served as a backbench supporter of Frank Miller's administration before the PCs were defeated in the house. He served for two years as a member of the opposition, and was his party's critic for Education and Community and Social Services. He finished third against Liberal Cindy Nicholas in the 1987 election.
