= Ontario Association of Former Parliamentarians =

Canadian provincial non-profit organization

The Ontario Association of Former Parliamentarians (OAFP) is a non-profit volunteer organization created to serve former Members of the Ontario Legislative Assembly.

Established by an act of the legislature in 2000, the objectives of the association are:

- to put the knowledge and experience of its members at the service of parliamentary democracy in Ontario and elsewhere
- to serve the public interest by providing non-partisan support for the parliamentary system of government in Ontario
- to foster a spirit of community among former parliamentarians
- to foster good relations between members of the Legislative Assembly of the Province of Ontario and former parliamentarians
- to protect and promote the interests of former parliamentarians

The association is strictly non-partisan and has former members from all three political parties serving on its board of directors.

== Activities ==
The association publishes a quarterly newsletter, The InFormer.

It is developing a variety of educational tools to assist in advancing awareness of the parliamentary form of government. It also acts as a central clearing house for former members seeking information from various departments of the Legislative Assembly.

The association has formed a relationship with similar groups of former parliamentarians in Quebec and Manitoba and, ultimately, is working towards the development of a global association of former members of state or provincial governments.

== Leadership ==
The Board of Directors in 2012 included:

Title	Name
Chair	Rev. Derwyn Shea
Vice-Chair	Gilles Morin
Secretary	Karen Haslam
Treasurer	Murad Velshi
Director	Steve Gilchrist
Director	John Hastings
Director	Lily Oddie Munro
Director	John Parker
Director	Joe Spina
Director	David Warner
