= Margaret Birch =

Canadian politician (1921–2020)

Ontario MPP
- In office 1971–1985
- Preceded by: Tim Reid
- Succeeded by: Ed Fulton
- Constituency: Scarborough East

Personal details
- Born: June 13, 1921 Leamington, Ontario
- Died: October 29, 2020 (aged 99) Toronto, Ontario
- Party: Progressive Conservative
- Spouse: Guy Cochran Birch
- Children: 2

Margaret Birch (13 June 1921 — 29 October 2020) was a Canadian politician in Ontario. She was a Progressive Conservative member of the Legislative Assembly of Ontario from 1971 to 1985 who represented the east Toronto riding of Scarborough East. She served as a cabinet minister in the government of William Davis. She was the first female cabinet minister in Ontario.

== Background ==
Birch was born in Leamington, Ontario, and was educated in the area before moving to Toronto. She was chair of the Scarborough Board of Health from 1963 to 1971, was on the Mental Health Council from 1967 to 1971, and was vice-chairman of the Social Planning Council from 1967 to 1970. She also served on the Board of Governors for Scarborough Centenary Hospital. Birch became the first woman member of the conservative Albany Club of Toronto, proposed by the then premier, Bill Davis. She married Guy Birch in 1949, a newspaper editor. They raised two children. Guy died in 1992. The Margaret Birch Wing was opened at the Centenary Hospital in 1986, now part of the Rouge Valley Health System.

== Politics ==
Birch ran for Scarborough council, ward 6 in 1962. She came in 3rd behind winner F.D. Cummings.

She was elected to the Ontario legislature in the 1971 provincial election, defeating incumbent Liberal Tim Reid by 670 votes in Scarborough East. She was re-elected in 1975, 1977 and 1981.

On September 28, 1972, she was appointed to cabinet as a Minister without portfolio responsible for youth. This made her the first woman to be appointed to an Ontario cabinet. Birch was promoted to Provincial Secretary for Social Development on February 26, 1974. In July 1983, she resigned from cabinet and assumed the role of Parliamentary assistant to Premier Bill Davis in charge of the 1984 Ontario Bicentennial celebration. Birch had wanted to leave office in 1981 but was persuaded by Davis to stay on.

In 1974, Birch became involved in policy discussions about child care. A series of recommendations were announced which became known as the Birch Proposals. The initiative was driven by cost reduction and they would have increased the child/adult ratio in day cares, decreased standards in staff qualifications and training, and reduced fire and safety regulations. The proposals were criticized by both non-profit and for profit day care associations for different reasons. The government eventually shelved the recommendations.

The Social Development secretariat was designed as a "super-ministry", overseeing several different ministries and agencies (e.g., health, social services, education, women's secretariat, youth secretariat, etc.). As such, the 'super minister' had direct authority over the funding, policies and directions of the individual ministries under its jurisdiction and worked to coordinate policies and programs that previously conflicted across disparate ministries but with somewhat related responsibilities (e.g., health and home care, and social services and home care). As such, it had few specifically defined responsibilities beyond the coordination function.

Birch endorsed Dennis Timbrell to succeed Davis as party leader in February 1985.

=== Cabinet positions ===
Davis ministry, Province of Ontario (1971–1985)
Cabinet posts (2)
Predecessor	Office	Successor
Bob Welch	Provincial Secretary for Social Development; 1974–1983	Bruce McCaffrey
Sub-Cabinet Post
Predecessor	Title	Successor
	Minister without portfolio (1972–1974); Responsible for Youth	
