= Frank Drea =

Canadian politician

Ontario MPP
- In office 1971–1985
- Preceded by: Margaret Renwick
- Succeeded by: William C. Davis
- Constituency: Scarborough Centre

Personal details
- Born: James Francis Drea; July 7, 1933 St. Catharines, Ontario
- Died: January 15, 2003 (aged 69)
- Party: Progressive Conservative
- Spouse: Jeanne
- Children: 3
- Profession: Journalist

James Francis "Frank" Drea (July 7, 1933 – January 15, 2003) was a Canadian journalist, broadcaster, politician and racehorse enthusiast. He was a Progressive Conservative member of the Legislative Assembly of Ontario from 1971 to 1985 representing the riding of Scarborough Centre. He served as a cabinet minister in the government of Premier Bill Davis.

== Background ==
Drea was born in St. Catharines, Ontario, and educated at Canisius College in Buffalo, New York. He was hired by the Toronto Telegram in 1955, and was a long-time reporter and columnist at the paper. In 1961, he won the National Newspaper Award and the Heywood Broun Award for Crusading Journalism for his work as a labour reporter for his coverage of a strike by Italian-Canadian building trade workers.

From 1963 to 1965, he worked as public relations director for the United Steel Workers of America in Sudbury, Ontario. A fervent anti-Communist, Drea played a leading role in the Steelworkers' unsuccessful campaign to raid and destroy the Communist Party influenced Mine, Mill and Smelter Workers Union which had dominated the mining industry in Sudbury. Drea's campaign was a failure, and he was fired.

He returned to the Telegram in 1965 as the paper's Action Line columnist, serving as an early consumer advocate. He remained with the newspaper until shortly before its demise in 1971. He also served with Dale Goldhawk as an outspoken, open-line host at CHIC Radio in Brampton, Ontario, and worked for CTV on the public affairs program W5.

== Politics ==
Drea was elected to the Legislative Assembly of Ontario in the 1971 provincial election as the Progressive Conservative Member of Provincial Parliament for Scarborough Centre. He defeated incumbent New Democrat Margaret Renwick by 4,873 votes. Drea was re-elected with smaller pluralities in the 1975 and 1977 elections, and by a larger percentage in 1981.

After serving for several years on the backbench, he was brought into the provincial cabinet of Bill Davis following the 1977 provincial election as Minister of Correctional Services. He initiated reforms in the province's system of jails, including the closure of the original Don Jail. On entering cabinet, Drea publicly revealed his battle with alcoholism, pledging to stop drinking in order to set an example for prisoners.

In 1978, he was appointed Minister of Consumer and Commercial Relations. After the 1981 provincial election, he became Minister of Community and Social Services, and is credited with improving the status of people with disabilities. In September 1983 he was hospitalized with circulation problems. He briefly gave up his cabinet position from September 29, 1983, to November 21, 1983. Citizenship and Culture minister Bruce McCaffrey was named to act in his place during this time.

He served in cabinet until Bill Davis retired as Premier of Ontario in 1985. Drea supported Roy McMurtry's bid to succeed Davis as party leader, and voted for Larry Grossman on the second ballot following McMurtry's elimination. He supported Frank Miller over Grossman on the third and final ballot. Drea explained that he had planned to support Miller after McMurtry's elimination, and only went to Grossman for one ballot on McMurtry's recommendation. He was not re-appointed to Miller's cabinet and instead served as parliamentary assistant to the premier. Drea was disappointed at being dropped from cabinet and decided not to run in the 1985 election. He said, "I'm not wanted so, I won't be running." He reflected on his time in politics. "I'm happy," he said. "I've had 14 marvellous years with Mr. Davis ... the greatest living Canadian."

=== Cabinet posts ===
Davis ministry, Province of Ontario (1971–1985)
Cabinet posts (3)
Predecessor	Office	Successor
Keith Norton	Minister of Community and Social Services; 1981–1985	Robert Elgie
Larry Grossman	Minister of Consumer and Commercial Relations; 1978–1981	Gordon Walker
John MacBeth	Minister of Correctional Services; 1977–1978	Gordon Walker

== Later life ==
Drea was appointed to the Ontario Municipal Board by Miller in May 1985. His tenure there was short as Miller's successor, Liberal Premier David Peterson, appointed Drea as chairman of the Ontario Racing Commission four month later. Drea remained chairman until 1994 when Bob Rae's NDP government decided not to reappoint him. He would not speculate on the reason for dropping him from the position. "I don't know why they're doing it," he shrugged. "It's like ball players. You get hired. You get fired." During his tenure as chairman he introduced teletheatres for simulcasting races across the province and was responsible for saving racetrack operations in Windsor, Elmira and Sudbury. He died on January 15, 2003, from pneumonia.
