= George Peck (Ontario politician) =

Canadian politician

Ontario MPP
- In office 1963–1967
- Preceded by: New riding
- Succeeded by: Margaret Renwick
- Constituency: Scarborough Centre

Personal details
- Born: November 16, 1917 Toronto, Ontario
- Died: January 1, 1993 (aged 75) Peterborough, Ontario
- Party: Progressive Conservative
- Occupation: Jeweller

George Henry Peck (November 16, 1917 – January 1, 1994) was a politician in Ontario, Canada. He was a Progressive Conservative member of the Legislative Assembly of Ontario from 1963 to 1967 who represented the riding of Scarborough Centre.

== Background ==
Peck was born in Toronto, Ontario, the son of George Henry Peck (1887–1978) and Agnes Crabb (1883–1950). Prior to his election to the provincial legislature, Peck was a trustee and the first Chair of the Scarborough Board of Education. In recognition of his public service, George Peck Public School in Scarborough was named after him.

During the Second World War George Peck was a member of the Royal Canadian Air Force, and served overseas in active duty.

Peck was a jeweller, by profession. He died in Peterborough, Ontario, on January 1, 1993, and is buried in the cemetery in Fenelon Falls, Ontario.

== Politics ==
Peck was the first MPP elected in the newly created riding of Scarborough Centre. He defeated New Democratic candidate E.K. Ranney by 400 votes. He served in the 27th Legislative Assembly of Ontario as a government backbencher in a majority PC government under Premier John Robarts. He was defeated in the 1967 provincial election by the NDP candidate Margaret Renwick by 898 votes.

He ran for a seat on the Scarborough Board of Control in the 1969 municipal election but failed to be elected.
