= Margaret Renwick =

Canadian politician

Margaret Ellen Price Renwick

Ontario MPP
- In office 1967–1971
- Preceded by: George Peck
- Succeeded by: Frank Drea
- Constituency: Scarborough Centre

Personal details
- Born: Margaret Price; February 1, 1923
- Died: January 20, 2012 (aged 88) Toronto, Ontario
- Party: New Democrat
- Spouse: Jim Renwick
- Children: 1

Margaret Renwick (February 1, 1923 – January 20, 2012) was a politician in Ontario, Canada. She was a New Democratic member of the Legislative Assembly of Ontario from 1967 to 1971 who represented the riding of Scarborough Centre.

== Background ==
She was married to Jim Renwick, the MPP for Riverdale from 1964 to 1984. Together they raised one daughter.

== Politics ==
Renwick ran in the 1967 provincial election as the NDP candidate in the riding of Scarborough Centre. She defeated Progressive Conservative incumbent George Peck, who came in third in a three-way race, by 6,415 votes. She joined her husband, Jim in the legislature to become the first husband and wife to serve together in the Ontario legislature. She was the party's critic for the Department of Social and Family Services. In 1970, she supported Stephen Lewis in his bid to become leader of the party.

In the 1971 election she was defeated by PC candidate Frank Drea by 4,873 votes.

In 1982, after the death of former premier, John Robarts, she praised his ability to rise above party politics. She recalled times when the legislature was in turmoil. She said, "He'd come in and listen. Then he'd rise and things would grow quiet as he'd speak. Then he'd put it all in perspective."

== Later life ==
After leaving political office, Renwick moved to Streetsville, a neighbourhood in Mississauga, Ontario, where she was active on the Streetsville NDP Riding Association. She moved back to Toronto in 2008 and died at the Trillium Health Centre.
