= Brad Duguid =

Canadian politician (born 1962)

The Honourable Brad Duguid ECO
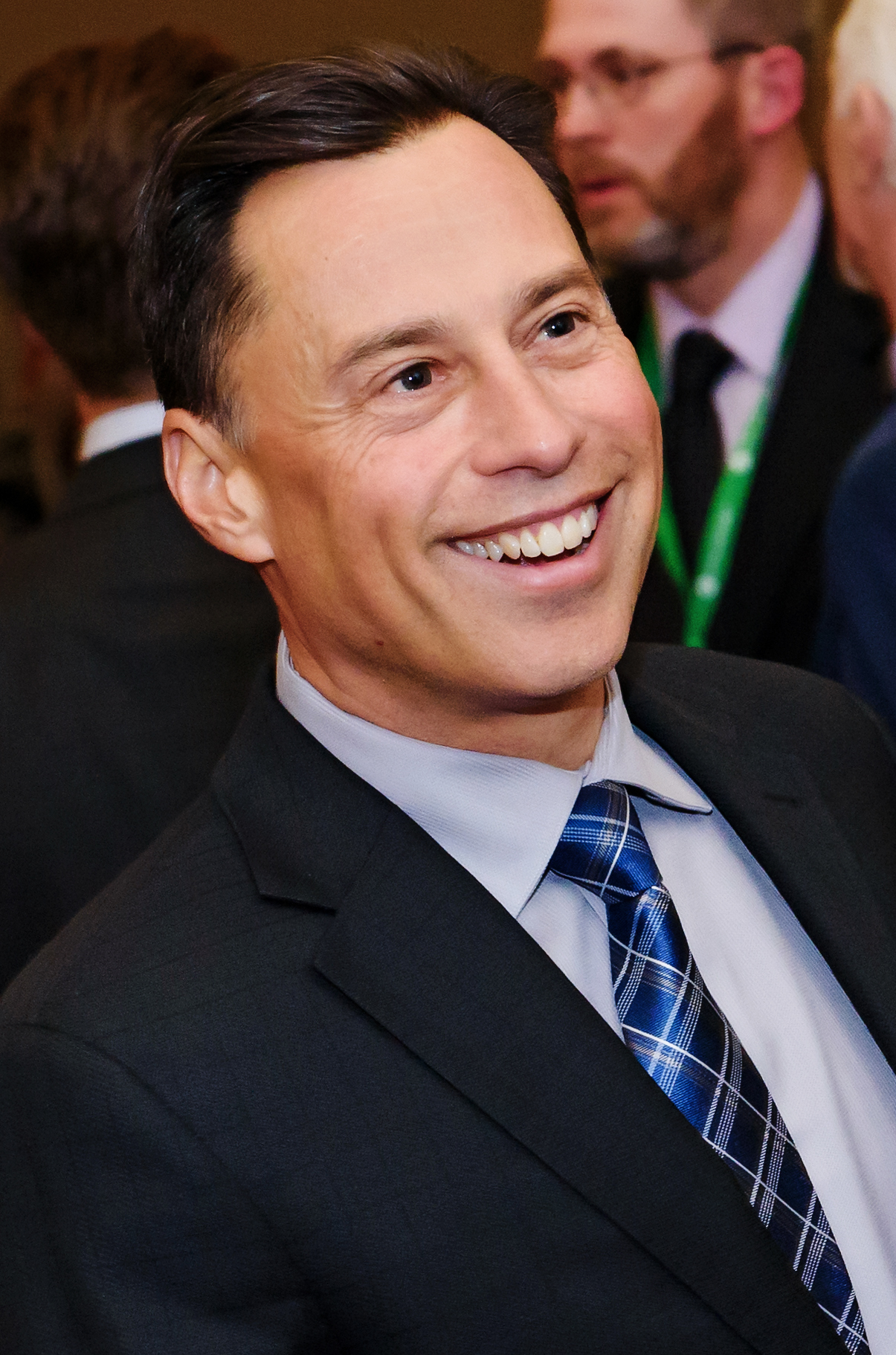
- Duguid in 2017

Ontario MPP
- In office 2003–2018
- Preceded by: Marilyn Mushinski
- Succeeded by: Christina Mitas
- Constituency: Scarborough Centre

Personal details
- Born: July 9, 1962 (age 64) Scarborough, Ontario
- Party: Liberal
- Spouse: Crystal
- Children: 2,
- Education: University of Toronto

Brad Duguid (born July 9, 1962) is a former politician in Ontario, Canada. He was a Liberal member of the Legislative Assembly of Ontario from 2003 to 2018 who represented the riding of Scarborough Centre in Toronto. He served as a cabinet minister in the governments of Dalton McGuinty and Kathleen Wynne.

== Background ==
Duguid was born in Scarborough and graduated from Woburn Collegiate Institute and the University of Toronto.

Before seeking elected office, Duguid worked in government services at the municipal, provincial and federal levels, serving as executive assistant to Metro Councillor Scott Cavalier, Ontario MPP Frank Faubert, and Liberal Members of Parliament Catherine Callbeck and Derek Lee.

== Politics ==
=== Municipal ===
In 1994, he was elected as a city councillor in the suburban municipality of Scarborough. In the elections of 1997 and 2000, he was elected as a councillor in the amalgamated "megacity" of Toronto. During his time in municipal government, Duguid was known for his work on community safety issues and affordable housing. He drafted a crime-prevention strategy for Toronto in 1999, and was a founder of the "Scarborough Community Safety Council", the "Scarborough Community Safety Audit Program" and the "Business Crime Prevention Seminar Program". He was also known as a supporter of then-Mayor of Toronto, Mel Lastman. In the 2003 election, Duguid supported John Tory over David Miller for Mayor of Toronto.

=== Provincial ===
On May 1, 2003, Duguid was appointed by Liberal leader Dalton McGuinty as the party's candidate for Scarborough Centre in the upcoming provincial election. This upset many in the local party association, as 1999 Ontario general election candidate Costas Manios was widely expected to win the nomination again. Manios decided to run against Duguid as an independent (essentially campaigning as an "Independent Liberal"), and many believed he would deny Duguid victory by splitting the Liberal vote. Instead, the provincial trend overrode local factors—Duguid defeated incumbent Progressive Conservative Marilyn Mushinski by over 10,000 votes, while Manios finished fourth, behind Michael Laxer of the Ontario New Democratic Party.

On October 23, 2003, Duguid was appointed Parliamentary Assistant on urban issues to John Gerretsen, the Ontario Minister of Municipal Affairs and Housing. As such, he has often clashed with Mayor David Miller over allegations by the mayor that the province has reneged on funding promises to the city.

Following his re-election in 2007, Duguid was appointed Minister of Labour. He ensured job protection for military reservists and improved health and safety in the workplace. He also saw the creation of the new Family Day holiday, allowing Ontario families to spend quality time together.

In a Cabinet shuffle on September 18, 2008, Duguid was appointed as the province's Minister of Aboriginal Affairs. As Minister of Aboriginal Affairs from 2008 to 2010, Duguid worked at building relationships through agreements with a number of First Nations and Métis organizations, including the framework to transfer Ipperwash Park to the Kettle and Stoney Point First Nation. Uniting two of his passions – youth outreach and hockey – Duguid also brought PLAY to First Nations' youth, a project that provides hockey coaching, mentoring and, potentially, facilities to Aboriginal communities in the north. On January 18, 2010 he was appointed Minister of Energy and Infrastructure.

In the re-election and subsequent Cabinet shuffle, in October 2011, the Cabinet was dissolved, and the Ministry of Energy and Infrastructure was split into two Ministries. The resulting cabinet Duguid was appointed as the Minister of Energy.

In the Cabinet, post election, on October 20, 2011, Brad Duguid was appointed Minister of Economic Development and Innovation.

In December 2012, CTV London reported that some of Minister Duguid's Christmas cards were sent without postage, instead using franking stickers only available to the monarch, federal MPs, senators and certain parliamentary employees. A staffer later resigned over the controversy.

After Kathleen Wynne took over in 2013, she appointed Duguid as the Minister of Training, Colleges and Universities. Duguid was re-elected in the June 2014 election. After the election he was appointed as the Minister of Economic Development, Employment and Infrastructure. On June 13, 2016, Duguid's portfolio was changed to Minister of Economic Development and Growth.

In September 2017, Duguid announced he would not be running for re-election in the next 2018 Ontario general election. His constituency was won by the Progressive Conservative candidate, Christina Mitas.

=== Cabinet positions ===
Wynne ministry, Province of Ontario (2013–2018)
Cabinet posts (3)
Predecessor	Office	Successor
Himself	Minister of Economic Development and Growth; 2016–2018	Steven Del Duca
Eric Hoskins	Minister of Economic Development, Employment and Infrastructure; 2014–2016	Bob Chiarelli (Note: As Minister of Infrastructure.)
John Milloy	Minister of Training, Colleges and Universities; 2013–2014	Reza Moridi
McGuinty ministry, Province of Ontario (2003–2013)
Cabinet posts (5)
Predecessor	Office	Successor
Sandra Pupatello	Minister of Economic Development and Innovation; 2011–2013	Eric Hoskins
Himself	Minister of Energy; 2010–2011	Chris Bentley
Gerry Phillips	Minister of Energy and Infrastructure; 2010 (January–August)	Bob Chiarelli as Minister of Infrastructure
Michael Bryant	Minister of Aboriginal Affairs; 2008–2010	Chris Bentley
Steve Peters	Minister of Labour; 2007–2008	Peter Fonseca

== Electoral record ==
2011 Ontario general election
Party	Candidate	Votes	%	±%
Liberal	Brad Duguid	16,142	00.0	
Progressive Conservative	Carol Williams	7,511	00.0	
New Democratic	Kathleen Mathurin	6,836	00.0	
Green	Jeff Mole	558	0.0	
Family Coalition	David Driver	301	0.0	

2007 Ontario general election
Party	Candidate	Votes	%	±%
Liberal	Brad Duguid	17,714	53.6	
Progressive Conservative	Sammy Appadurai	8,316	25.2	
New Democratic	Kathleen Mathurin	4,401	13.3	
Green	Andrew Strachan	1,827	5.5	
Family Coalition	Thomas Lang	459	1.4	
Libertarian	David Predovich	349	1.1	

2003 Ontario general election
Party	Candidate	Votes	%	±%
Liberal	Brad Duguid	21,698	52.07	+17.54
Progressive Conservative	Marilyn Mushinski	11,686	28.04	-15.08
New Democratic	Michael Laxer	3,653	8.77	-11.14
Independent	Costas Manios	3,259	7.82	
Green	Robert Carty	642	1.54	
Family Coalition	Joseph Internicola	495	1.19	-0.17
Communist	Elizabeth Rowley	241	0.58	
