= Ed Fulton =

Canadian politician

The Honourable Ed Fulton ECO

Ontario MPP
- In office 1985–1990
- Preceded by: Margaret Birch
- Succeeded by: Bob Frankford
- Constituency: Scarborough East

Personal details
- Born: Edward A. Fulton; March 19, 1938 (age 88) Scarborough, Ontario
- Party: Liberal

Edward A. "Ed" Fulton (born March 19, 1938), is a former politician in Ontario, Canada. He was a Liberal member of the Legislative Assembly of Ontario from 1985 to 1990 who represented the eastern Toronto riding of Scarborough East. He served as a cabinet minister in the government of David Peterson. From 1969 to 1984 he served as a municipal politician in the city of Scarborough, Toronto.

== Background ==
Fulton attended the R.H. King Academy in Scarborough.

== Politics ==
=== Municipal ===
He served as an alderman in the city of Scarborough (now part of Toronto) from 1969 to 1984, and was a city controller from 1984 to 1985. He also served on the Metro Toronto Council from 1981 to 1982 and from 1984 to 1985. He served as chair of the Waterfront Advisory Board during his time on the Metro Council.

=== Provincial ===
He was elected to the Ontario legislature in the 1985 provincial election, defeating his Progressive Conservative opponent by 4,610 votes. The Liberal Party formed a minority government after this election, and Fulton was appointed to cabinet on June 26, 1985, as Minister of Transportation and Communications.

Easily returned in the 1987 election, Fulton remained in cabinet in the restructured portfolio of Ministry of Transportation. In June 1989, Fulton was implicated in the Patti Starr affair. Starr, who was head of the National Council of Jewish Women, misused her position by having the organization make political contributions to the riding associations of prominent Liberal MPPs. Fulton's riding of Scarborough East was among those who received an illegal contribution. On August 2, when Peterson shuffled his cabinet in the wake of the scandal, Fulton was not included.

The Liberals were defeated in the 1990 provincial election, and Fulton lost his seat by 1,774 votes to Bob Frankford of the Ontario New Democratic Party. The Liberal Party asked him to run again in the 1995 election, but he declined the offer in order to spend more time on his consulting business.

=== Cabinet positions ===
Peterson ministry, Province of Ontario (1985–1990)
Cabinet post (1)
Predecessor	Office	Successor
James Snow	Minister of Transportation; 1985–1989	Bill Wrye
