= York—Scarborough (provincial electoral district) =

Former provincial electoral district in Ontario, Canada

Ontario electoral district

Defunct provincial electoral district
- Legislature: Legislative Assembly of Ontario
- District created: 1955
- District abolished: 1963
- First contested: 1955
- Last contested: 1959

York—Scarborough (Note: Sometimes referred to 'York—Scarboro' in the local media.) was a provincial electoral district in Ontario, Canada, that existed from 1955 to 1963. It occupied the entire area of the former borough of Scarborough. In 1963 it was split between four new ridings: Scarborough North, Scarborough East, Scarborough Centre and Scarborough West.

== Members of Provincial Parliament ==
York—Scarborough
Assembly	Years	Member	Party
prior to 1955 part of the York East riding
25th	1955–1959	Dick Sutton	Progressive Conservative
26th	1959–1963	Dick Sutton	Progressive Conservative
Sourced from the Ontario Legislative Assembly
Split between the ridings of Scarborough North, Scarborough East, Scarbough Centre and Scarborough West in 1963

== Election results ==
1955 Ontario general election
Party	Candidate	Votes	%
Progressive Conservative	Dick Sutton	13,806	42.22
Liberal	Oliver E. Crockford	12,281	37.55
Co-operative Commonwealth	Alois L. Wagner	6,287	19.22
Labor–Progressive	Florence Theodore	330	1.01
Total valid votes		32,704	100.00
Source: Centennial Edition of a History of the Electoral Districts, Legislatures and Ministries of the Province of Ontario 1867-1967

1959 Ontario general election
Party	Candidate	Votes	%
Progressive Conservative	Dick Sutton	18,778	37.26
Liberal	Oliver E. Crockford	17,242	34.21
Co-operative Commonwealth	Andrew G. Bodrug	14,380	28.53
Total valid votes		50,400	100.00
Source: Centennial Edition of a History of the Electoral Districts, Legislatures and Ministries of the Province of Ontario 1867-1967

== See also ==
- List of Ontario provincial electoral districts
- Canadian provincial electoral districts
