= Louis Hodgson =

Canadian politician

Lou Hodgson

Ontario MPP
- In office 1963–1967
- Preceded by: New Riding
- Succeeded by: Tim Reid
- Constituency: Scarborough East

Personal details
- Born: March 21, 1936; Victoria, Ontario, Canada
- Died: July 7, 2012 (aged 76); Haliburton, Ontario, Canada
- Political party: Progressive Conservative
- Spouse: Kleo McWatters
- Relations: Clayton Hodgson, father Glen Hodgson, brother
- Children: 2
- Occupation: Police officer

Louis Maclean "Lou" Hodgson (March 21, 1936 – July 7, 2012) was a politician in Ontario, Canada. He was a Progressive Conservative member of the Legislative Assembly of Ontario from 1963 to 1967 who represented the eastern Toronto riding of Scarborough East.

== Background ==
Hodgson was born in Victoria, Ontario. His father, Clayton Hodgson, was a Progressive Conservative member of the House of Commons of Canada from 1945 to 1963. Prior to being elected, Hodgson was an officer in the Royal Canadian Mounted Police and also worked for the Ontario department of Transport and as a salesman. He was married to Kleo McWatters and they raised a son and a daughter.

== Politics ==
Hodgson ran in the 1963 provincial election as the Progressive Conservative candidate in the new riding of Scarborough East. He defeated Liberal candidate Jack Drysdale by 1,704 votes. His brother Glen Hodgson also won a seat in the Caledon riding of Victoria. He served as a backbench supporter of the government of John Robarts.

He was defeated in the 1967 election by Liberal candidate Tim Reid in an extremely close three-way race in which the margin was 216 votes and all three candidates were separated by less than half a percent of the total votes.

== Later life ==
After the 1967 election, Hodgson retired from politics. During his time in office, he established a Young PC Club in his riding and one its first members, Dennis Timbrell, went on to become a prominent Cabinet Minister in a future PC government. In the late 1960s, the government recruited Hodgson to establish the first drivers education programs in Ontario high schools.

He died in Haliburton in 2012. He is buried in Evergreen Cemetery, Haliburton, Ontario.
