= Hastings—Frontenac—Lennox and Addington (provincial electoral district) =

Former electoral district in Ontario, Canada

Ontario electoral district

Defunct provincial electoral district
- Legislature: Legislative Assembly of Ontario
- District created: 1999
- District abolished: 2003
- First contested: 1999
- Last contested: 2000

Hastings—Frontenac—Lennox and Addington was a provincial electoral district in Ontario, Canada, that was represented in the Legislative Assembly of Ontario from 1999 to 2007.

== Geography ==
In 1996, the riding was re-defined to consist of:

- the County of Frontenac, excepting the City of Kingston, the townships of Howe Island, Kingston and Wolfe Island, and that part of the Township of Pittsburgh lying south of the Macdonald-Cartier Freeway;
- the County of Lennox and Addington;
- that part of the County of Hastings lying northerly of the southerly boundary of the townships of Hungerford, Huntingdon and Rawdon, and the southerly limit of the Village of Stirling.

The electoral district was abolished in 2003 when it was redistributed into the Kingston and the Islands, Lanark—Frontenac—Lennox and Addington, and Prince Edward—Hastings ridings.

== Election results ==
2003 Ontario general election
Party	Candidate	Votes	%	±%
Liberal	Leona Dombrowsky	21,548	51.89	+5.15
Progressive Conservative	Barry F. Gordon	13,709	33.01	–9.50
New Democratic	Ross Sutherland	4,286	10.32	+3.43
Green	Adam Scott	1,311	3.16	+1.84
Family Coalition	John-Henry Westen	673	1.62	+0.42
Total valid votes		41,527	99.42	
Total rejected, unmarked and declined ballots		243	0.58	–0.02
Turnout		41,770	58.68	–2.80
Eligible voters		71,181		
Liberal hold		Swing		+7.33
Source: Elections Ontario

1999 Ontario general election
Party	Candidate	Votes	%
Liberal	Leona Dombrowsky	20,395	46.74
Progressive Conservative	Harry Danford	18,553	42.52
New Democratic	Allan McPhail	3,008	6.89
Green	Cathy Vakil	576	1.32
Family Coalition	John-Henry Westen	524	1.20
Natural Law	Peter Leggat	382	0.88
Independent	Karl Eric Walker	200	0.46
Total valid votes		43,638	99.40
Total rejected, unmarked and declined ballots		265	0.60
Turnout		43,903	61.48
Eligible voters		71,406	
Liberal pickup new district.			
Source: Elections Ontario

== See also ==
- List of Ontario provincial electoral districts
- List of Canadian electoral districts
