= Niagara West—Glanbrook (provincial electoral district) =

Former provincial electoral district in Ontario, Canada

Coordinates: 43.115°N 79.575°W

Ontario electoral district
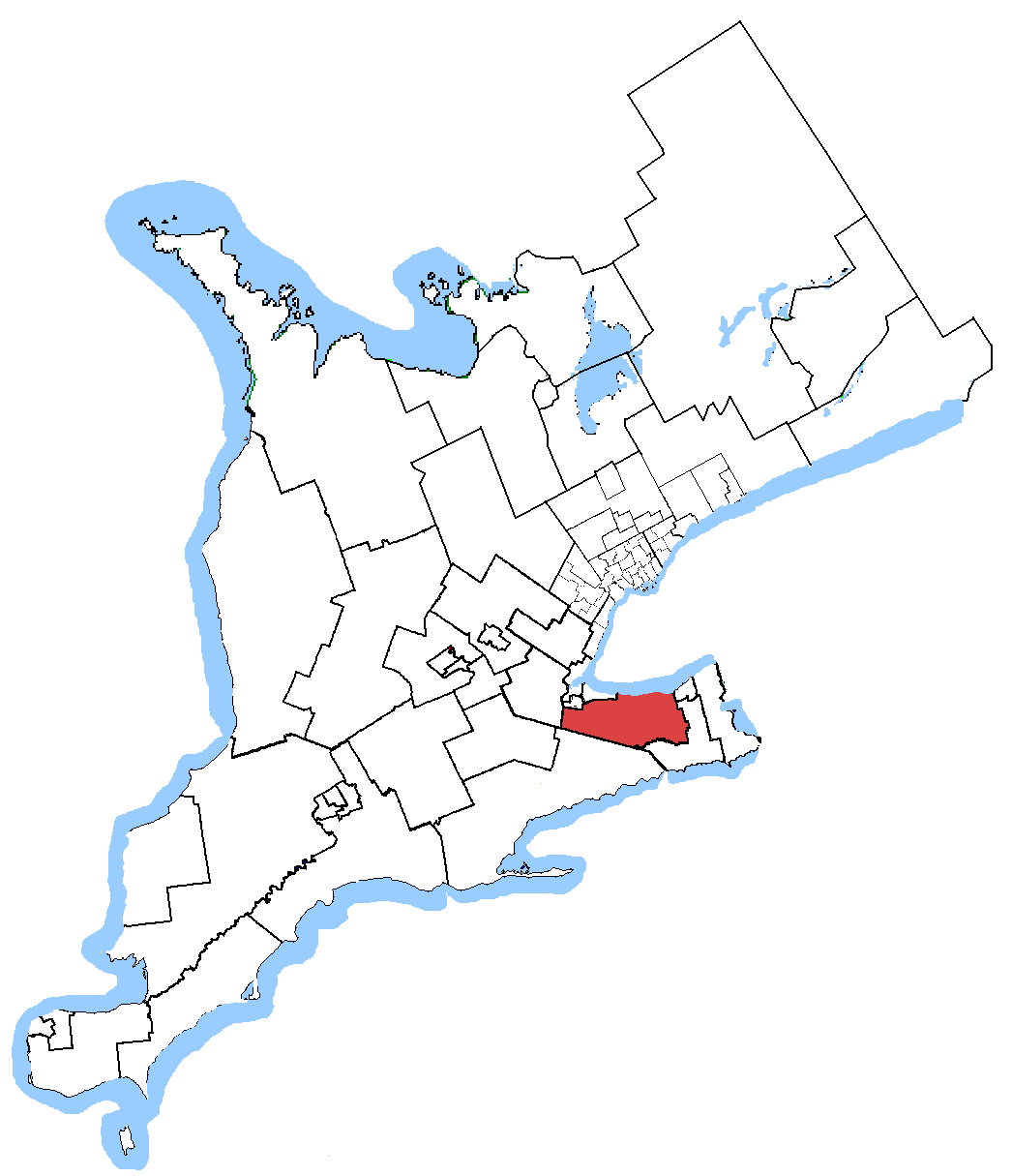
- Niagara West—Glanbrook in relation to southern Ontario ridings

Defunct provincial electoral district
- Legislature: Legislative Assembly of Ontario
- District created: 2004
- District abolished: 2018
- First contested: 2007
- Last contested: 2016

Demographics
- Population (2006): 111,024
- Electors (2007): 80,444
- Area (km²): 1,080
- Census division(s): Hamilton, Niagara
- Census subdivision(s): Hamilton, Grimsby, Pelham, West Lincoln, Lincoln

Niagara West—Glanbrook was a provincial electoral district in south eastern Ontario, Canada between 2007 and 2018. It elected one member to the Legislative Assembly of Ontario.

The riding, which was first contested in the 2007 provincial election, consisted of the municipalities of Grimsby, Pelham, West Lincoln, Lincoln and that part of Hamilton east of Glancaster Road and south of the transmission line south of Rymal Road south of the former city of Hamilton, and also south of the Niagara Escarpment east of the former city.

52.5% of the riding came from Stoney Creek, 31.5% came from Erie—Lincoln, 15.6% came from Niagara Centre and 0.2% came from Hamilton Mountain.

In 2018, the riding was dissolved into Niagara West and Flamborough—Glanbrook.

== Demographics ==
According to the 2011 Canadian census

- Ethnic groups: 93.3% White, 1.5% South Asian, 1.2% Aboriginal, 1.1% Black
- Languages: 85.6% English, 2.1% Italian, 2.0% Dutch, 1.7% French, 1.5% Polish, 1.3% German
- Religion: 76.2% Christian (32.0% Catholic, 9.6% United Church, 8.5% Anglican, 2.8% Presbyterian, 1.8% Christian Orthodox, 1.8% Baptist, 1.3% Pentecostal, 1.1% Lutheran, 17.4% Other Christian), 1.2% Muslim, 21.1% No religion.
- Average household income: $94,033
- Median household income: $80,296
- Average individual income: $45,345
- Median individual income: $35,874

== Members of Provincial Parliament ==
Niagara West—Glanbrook
| Assembly | Years | Member | Party |
|---|---|---|---|
Riding created from Stoney Creek, Erie—Lincoln, Niagara Centre and Hamilton Mountain
| 39th | 2007–2011 | Tim Hudak | Progressive Conservative |
| 40th | 2011–2014 | Tim Hudak | Progressive Conservative |
| 41st | 2014–2016 | Tim Hudak | Progressive Conservative |
| 41st | 2016–2018 | Sam Oosterhoff | Progressive Conservative |
Riding dissolved into Niagara West and Flamborough—Glanbrook

== Election results ==
Ontario provincial by-election, November 17, 2016 Resignation of Tim Hudak
| Party | Candidate | Votes | % | ±% |
|---|---|---|---|---|
| Progressive Conservative | Sam Oosterhoff | 17,652 | 53.95 | +12.13 |
| New Democratic | Michael Thomas | 8,159 | 24.94 | +2.71 |
| Liberal | Vicky Ringuette | 4,997 | 15.27 | –13.07 |
| Green | Donna Cridland | 892 | 2.73 | –2.65 |
| Libertarian | Stefanos Karatopis | 355 | 1.09 | –0.65 |
| None of the Above | Gregory Vezina | 343 | 1.05 | – |
| Independent | Martin Poos | 200 | 0.61 | – |
| Stop the New Sex-Ed Agenda | Queenie Yu | 76 | 0.23 | – |
| Canadian Constituents' | Arthur Smitherman | 44 | 0.13 | – |
| Total valid votes | | 32,718 | 99.45 | |
| Total rejected, unmarked and declined ballots | | 182 | 0.55 | –1.29 |
| Turnout | | 32,900 | 32.23 | –26.36 |
| Eligible voters | | 102,076 | | |
| Progressive Conservative hold | | Swing | | +4.71 |
Source: Elections Ontario

2014 Ontario general election
| Party | Candidate | Votes | % | ±% |
|---|---|---|---|---|
| Progressive Conservative | Tim Hudak | 23,378 | 41.82 | –9.13 |
| Liberal | David Mossey | 15,843 | 28.34 | +2.36 |
| New Democratic | Brian McCormack | 12,423 | 22.22 | +3.68 |
| Green | Basia Krzyzanowski | 3,004 | 5.37 | +2.57 |
| Libertarian | Stefanos Karatopis | 970 | 1.74 | +1.40 |
| Freedom | Geoff Peacock | 284 | 0.51 | +0.34 |
| Total valid votes | | 55,902 | 98.15 | |
| Total rejected, unmarked and declined ballots | | 1,052 | 1.85 | +1.43 |
| Turnout | | 56,954 | 58.59 | +3.71 |
| Eligible voters | | 97,201 | | |
| Progressive Conservative hold | | Swing | | –5.74 |
Source: Elections Ontario

2011 Ontario general election
| Party | Candidate | Votes | % | ±% |
|---|---|---|---|---|
| Progressive Conservative | Tim Hudak | 24,919 | 50.95 | –0.10 |
| Liberal | Katie Trombetta | 12,708 | 25.98 | –4.03 |
| New Democratic | Anthony Marco | 9,070 | 18.55 | +6.35 |
| Green | Meredith Cross | 1,372 | 2.81 | –3.93 |
| Family Coalition | Phil Lees | 303 | 0.62 | – |
| Libertarian | Rob Wienhold | 166 | 0.34 | – |
| People's Political Party | Marty Poos | 158 | 0.32 | – |
| Reform | Gerry Augustine | 130 | 0.27 | – |
| Freedom | Geoff Peacock | 80 | 0.16 | – |
| Total valid votes | | 48,906 | 99.58 | |
| Total rejected, unmarked and declined ballots | | 205 | 0.42 | –0.16 |
| Turnout | | 49,111 | 54.88 | –3.69 |
| Eligible voters | | 89,489 | | |
| Progressive Conservative hold | | Swing | | +1.96 |
Source: Elections Ontario

2007 Ontario general election
| Party | Candidate | Votes | % | ±% |
|---|---|---|---|---|
| Progressive Conservative | Tim Hudak | 24,311 | 51.06 | +3.69 |
| Liberal | Mike Lostracco | 14,290 | 30.01 | –5.76 |
| New Democratic | Bonnie Bryan | 5,809 | 12.20 | –1.50 |
| Green | Sid Frere | 3,206 | 6.73 | – |
| Total valid votes | | 47,616 | 99.43 | |
| Total rejected, unmarked and declined ballots | | 275 | 0.57 | – |
| Turnout | | 47,891 | 58.57 | – |
| Eligible voters | | 81,765 | | |
| Progressive Conservative notional hold | | Swing | | +4.72 |
Source: Elections Ontario

2003 general election redistributed results
| Party | Vote | % |
|---|---|---|
| Progressive Conservative | 20,306 | 47.37 |
| Liberal | 15,334 | 35.77 |
| New Democratic | 5,874 | 13.70 |
| Others | 1,356 | 3.16 |

== 2007 electoral reform referendum ==
2007 Ontario electoral reform referendum
| Side | Votes | % |
|---|---|---|
| First Past the Post | 30,972 | 65.7 |
| Mixed member proportional | 16,195 | 34.3 |
| Total valid votes | 47,167 | 100.0 |
