= Erie—Lincoln (provincial electoral district) =

Former provincial electoral district in Ontario, Canada

Ontario electoral district

Defunct provincial electoral district
- Legislature: Legislative Assembly of Ontario
- First contested: 1999
- Last contested: 2003

Demographics
- Census division: Niagara
- Census subdivision(s): Lincoln, West Lincoln, Wainfleet, Dunnville, Port Colborne, Fort Erie

Erie—Lincoln was a provincial electoral district in Ontario, Canada, that elected members to the Legislative Assembly of Ontario.

The riding was first contested in 1999. Created from the former Lincoln, Brant—Haldimand and Niagara South ridings, it was abolished upon the calling of the 2007 election. It was redistributed into Niagara West—Glanbrook, Haldimand—Norfolk, Niagara Falls and Welland. It consisted of the municipalities of Lincoln, West Lincoln, Wainfleet, Dunnville, Port Colborne and Fort Erie.

== Members of Provincial Parliament ==
For its entire existence, the riding was represented by Tim Hudak, from the Ontario Progressive Conservative Party.

Erie—Lincoln
Assembly	Years	Member	Party
Riding created from Lincoln, Brant—Haldimand and Niagara South
37th	1999–2003	Tim Hudak	Progressive Conservative
38th	2003–2007	Tim Hudak	Progressive Conservative
Riding dissolved into Niagara West—Glanbrook, Haldimand—Norfolk, Niagara Falls, and Welland

== Election results ==
2003 Ontario general election
Party	Candidate	Votes	%	±%
Progressive Conservative	Tim Hudak	20,348	48.49	–2.19
Liberal	Vance Badawey	16,290	38.82	+2.68
New Democratic	Julius Antal	3,950	9.41	–0.20
Green	Tom Ferguson	713	1.70	–
Family Coalition	Stephen Elgersma	666	1.59	–0.91
Total valid votes		41,967	99.42	
Total rejected, unmarked and declined ballots		243	0.58	–0.34
Turnout		42,210	60.85	+0.26
Eligible voters		69,369		
Progressive Conservative hold		Swing		–2.44
Source: Elections Ontario

1999 Ontario general election
Party	Candidate	Votes	%	±%
Progressive Conservative	Tim Hudak	20,481	50.68	–
Liberal	Lorne Boyko	14,603	36.14	–
New Democratic	Dave Thomas	3,884	9.61	–
Family Coalition	Alfred Kiers	1,009	2.50	–
Natural Law	John Gregory	435	1.08	–
Total valid votes		40,412	99.08	
Total rejected, unmarked and declined ballots		375	0.92	–
Turnout		40,787	60.59	–
Eligible voters		67,320		
Progressive Conservative pickup new district.				
Source: Elections Ontario

== See also ==
- List of Ontario provincial electoral districts
- Canadian provincial electoral districts
