= Tim Hudak =

Canadian politician (born 1967)

The Honourable Tim Hudak ECO
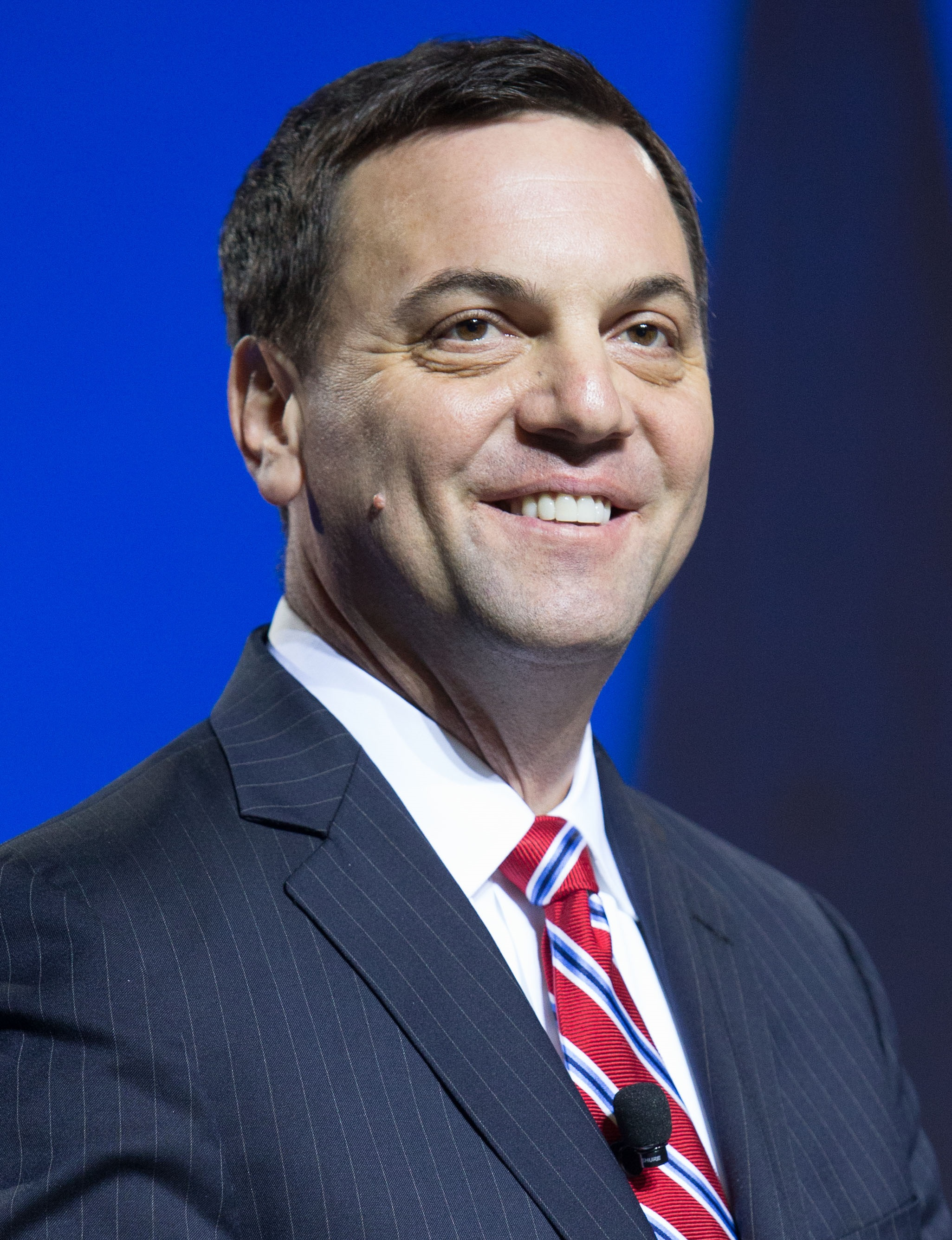
- Hudak in February 2014

Leader of the Official Opposition
- In office July 1, 2009 – July 2, 2014
- Preceded by: Bob Runciman
- Succeeded by: Jim Wilson

Leader of the Progressive Conservative Party of Ontario
- In office June 27, 2009 – July 2, 2014
- Preceded by: Bob Runciman (interim)
- Succeeded by: Jim Wilson (interim)

Member of the Ontario Provincial Parliament for Niagara West—Glanbrook Erie—Lincoln (1999-2007) Niagara South (1995-1999)
- In office June 8, 1995 – September 16, 2016
- Preceded by: Shirley Coppen
- Succeeded by: Sam Oosterhoff

Personal details
- Born: Timothy Patrick Hudak; November 1, 1967 (age 59) Fort Erie, Ontario, Canada
- Party: Progressive Conservative
- Spouse: Deb Hutton
- Children: 2
- Education: University of Western Ontario (BA); University of Washington (MA)
- Occupation: Politician; business manager
- Nickname: Tim Hudak

Timothy Patrick Hudak (born November 1, 1967) is a former Canadian politician who led the Ontario Progressive Conservative (PC) Party from 2009 to 2014. Hudak was a member of Provincial Parliament (MPP) from 1995 to 2016 and was also the leader of the Opposition in Ontario when he was PC party leader. He served as a cabinet minister in the governments of Mike Harris and Ernie Eves. After resigning his seat in the Ontario legislature in September 2016, Hudak became the chief executive officer of the Ontario Real Estate Association (OREA), which has its headquarters in Toronto.

== Early life and education ==
Hudak was born in Fort Erie, Ontario, to Anne Marie (née Dillon) and Pat Hudak. His father was a high school principal whose parents came to Canada from Eastern Slovakia (villages Lubotin and Circ in Stara Lubovna district) in advance of World War II. His mother was a teacher, of Irish and French-Canadian descent.

Hudak attended the University of Western Ontario, receiving a Bachelor of Arts degree in economics in 1990. He then studied at the University of Washington in Seattle on a full scholarship. He received a master's degree in economics in 1993. While in university, Hudak worked at the Peace Bridge on the US-Canada border from 1988–93.

In 1994, he was hired by Walmart as a travelling manager, instructing employees on the company's policies and operating procedures.

== Politics ==
=== Early political career ===
Hudak ran in the provincial election of 1995 in the riding of Niagara South. He defeated Liberal Aubrey Foley by 1,181 votes. Aged 27, Hudak was the second-youngest Member of Provincial Parliament (MPP) elected in 1995, the youngest being John Baird.

The Progressive Conservatives won a majority government under Mike Harris, and Hudak was appointed Parliamentary Assistant to Minister of Health Jim Wilson. He later served as Parliamentary Assistant to Wilson's successor, Elizabeth Witmer.

=== 1999 election ===
Hudak was re-elected with a 5,878 vote margin in the redistributed riding of Erie—Lincoln in the 1999 provincial election, and was named Minister of Northern Development and Mines on June 17, 1999. As part of the party's Provincial Mandate and environmental program, Mr. Hudak voted to enact the Drive Clean Program.

On February 8, 2001, he was named Minister of Culture, Tourism and Recreation. As Tourism Minister, Hudak visited 101 festivals and events across Ontario in the summer of 2001 on his More to Discover Tour. Immediately following the September 11 attacks in 2001, Hudak called together leaders in the tourism industry and executed a plan that provided $14 million for marketing to help the industry recover. During his time in the Ministry, he awarded nearly $300 million to rebuild aging infrastructure in communities across the province through SuperBuild's Sports, Culture and Tourism Partnership fund.

He supported Jim Flaherty's unsuccessful bid to become party leader in 2002. On April 15, 2002, new Premier Ernie Eves appointed him Minister of Consumer and Business Services.

Eves ministry, Province of Ontario (2002–2003)
Cabinet post (1)
Predecessor	Office	Successor
Norm Sterling	Minister of Consumer and Business Services; 2002–2003	Jim Watson
Harris ministry, Province of Ontario (1995–2002)
Cabinet posts (2)
Predecessor	Office	Successor
Cam Jackson	Minister of Culture, Tourism and Recreation; 2001–2002	Cam Jackson
Chris Hodgson	Minister of Northern Development and Mines; 1999–2001	Dan Newman

=== 2003 election ===
The Tories lost the provincial election of 2003, although Hudak was easily re-elected by a margin of 4,058 votes. He was appointed as PC Caucus Chair and critic responsible for Public Infrastructure Renewal, and later elevated to the role of critic for both Municipal Affairs and Housing and Public Infrastructure Renewal. In opposition, he introduced a bill to create a new retail system for Ontario Vintners Quality Alliance wines in competition with the provincial distribution system. He also proposed Bill 75, also known as the Homestead Act, which aimed to cap residential property assessment increases at five per cent.

Hudak again supported Jim Flaherty's bid to become party leader in the 2004 PC leadership election. In August 2005, PC leader John Tory appointed Hudak to the lead role of Official Opposition Finance Critic.

=== 2007 election ===
Although the Tories lost the 2007 Ontario election, Hudak won his riding with a 10,022 vote margin, gaining 51 per cent of the popular vote.

=== Party leadership ===
On April 2, 2009, Hudak launched his campaign for the leadership of the Progressive Conservative Party. Considered by many as the frontrunner in the race, Hudak had secured the support of over half the caucus at the launch of his campaign. Hudak was endorsed by federal Conservative cabinet ministers John Baird and Tony Clement, who had served alongside him in the cabinets of Harris and Eves. During the campaign, Hudak was quoted as saying that if the PCs want to regain government, they would have to make inroads in major cities and begin "reaching out to new Canadian communities.... I want to make sure that the next wave of new Canadians – whether from the Czech Republic or India or China – will see the Ontario PC party as home."

The leader was chosen by a preferential ballot on June 27, 2009, in Markham, Ontario. Hudak placed first out of the four candidates defeating Frank Klees, Christine Elliott, and Randy Hillier. On July 1, he assumed the position as leader of the opposition.

=== Official opposition ===
In August 2009, shortly after taking power, Hudak criticized the Ontario Lottery and Gaming Corporation (OLG) after a string of controversies. The government had forced the resignation of several board members and, according to Canadian broadcaster CTV, Hudak "suggested the government was trying to pre-empt another eHealth-like scandal, and promised his party would "shine the light" on any Liberal misspending." Following Hudak's opposition, Ontario Finance Minister Dwight Duncan fired the corporation's CEO, Kelly McDougald, "for cause". The Canadian Broadcasting Corporation (CBC) also reported that a freedom-of-information request by Hudak's Tories was behind the shakeup. According to Hudak, the Liberals "knew it would be coming up in the opening session of the legislature, [so they] put it out today to head off the scandal.... But you're not going to stop the scandalous spending until [Premier Dalton] McGuinty sets the tone by firing one of his ministers."

On September 10, 2009, Hudak delivered his first major speech as Party leader to the Economic Club of Canada. In his speech, Hudak attacked the Liberals for unnecessary spending at eHealth and OLG, as well as giving a $263-million grant to a video game developer.

On October 19, 2009, Hudak launched a petition to support the new West Lincoln Memorial Hospital (WLMH) in West Niagara. The petition called on the McGuinty government as well as the Minister of Health to stop the Hamilton-Niagara-Haldimand-Brant Local Health Integration Network from delaying the construction of the new hospital.

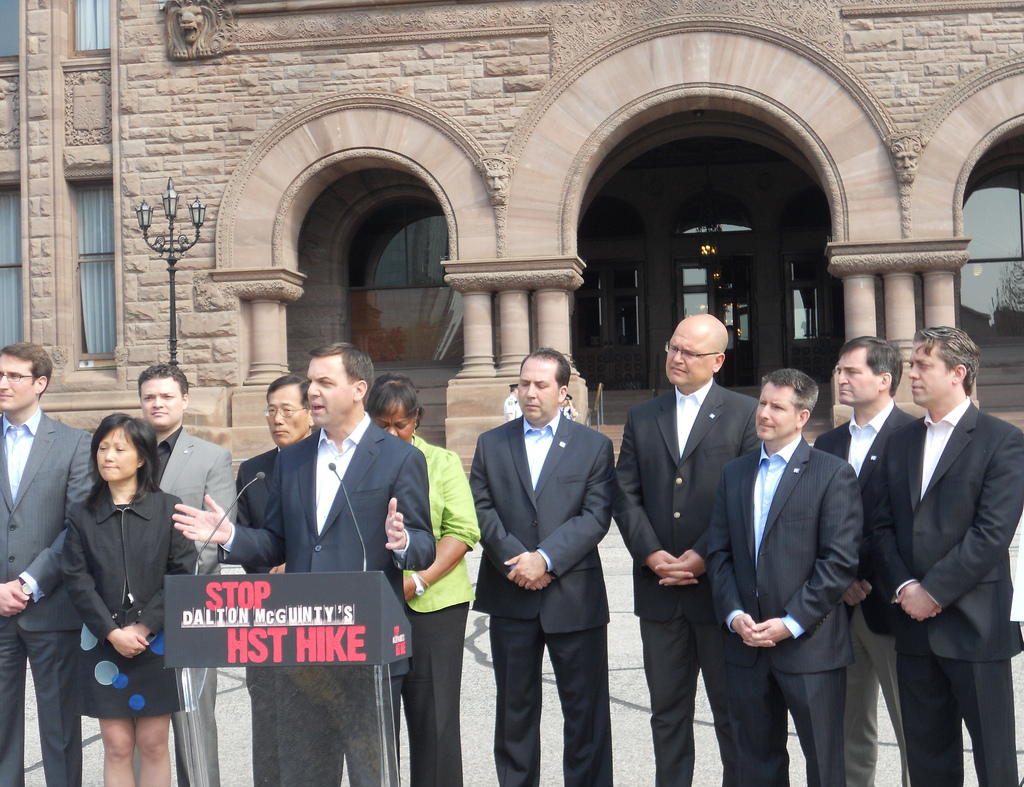
Hudak speaking outside Queen's Park with PC candidates

During the fall 2009 legislative session, Hudak launched one of his first major platform pieces, the PC Caucus Small Business Jobs Plan, which he stated was essential to Ontario's economic recovery. Also during the fall of 2009, Hudak and his party ramped up their opposition to the Harmonized Sales Tax (HST). The HST, came into effect July 1, 2010, blended the previous eight per cent provincial sales tax with the five per cent Goods and Services Tax (GST).

By the end of 2009, polls indicated that under Hudak's leadership, the Ontario PC Party jumped from a distant second to a double-digit lead. The Party’s first year under Hudak’s leadership wrapped up with the Conservative’s Northern Ontario jobs plan, a plan to restore jobs and economic growth to Ontario’s vast north. "The big picture here is that [when] developing economies like China and India grow, and the American economy rebounds, there will be a massive appetite for Ontario’s wood products and minerals and other resources", Hudak said.

Hudak also criticized the McGuinty government’s approach to Ontario's nuclear industry. In line with his plan for the North, Hudak commented that “Reducing Northern Ontario's high energy costs is key to making industries there more profitable and preventing future mill closures.”

In March 2010 by-elections, the Tories retained retired MPP Bob Runciman's riding of Leeds-Grenville, boosting their support by 19 points to 67 per cent of the vote. The party lost a second race in Ottawa West-Nepean to former Ottawa mayor and former MPP Bob Chiarelli, although they improved their showing over the results of the 2007 election. In a third by-election held in Toronto Centre on the same day, the Progressive Conservative candidate came in third with fifteen percent of the vote.

Later in April, Hudak and the Ontario PC party focused Question Period on the Local Health Integrated Network (LHIN), a system of regional health authorities established by the McGuinty government. Offering examples of sole-sourced contracting, Hudak hammered the government for broken promises and removing money from front-line care. He said the amount of money paid out in six-figure salaries to LHIN executives and managers had nearly doubled since 2006 and promised to dissolve the LHINs if he were to win the Ontario general election in 2011.

On Canada Day, 2010, the controversial harmonized sales tax (HST) came into effect across the province of Ontario. Tim Hudak responded by saying, “Dalton McGuinty will do what he does best, raising taxes on hard-working families. People will feel it at first at the pumps overnight. Next they will get hit with it on their utility bills."

Hudak also vowed to eliminate the eco-tax, a fee on certain environmentally harmful products brought in by McGuinty, if he were elected Premier.

In August 2010, Ontario Ombudsman André Marin exposed a bylaw that enables local health bureaucrats to hold closed-door meetings on hospital closures. Controversial decisions on hospital restructuring in the Niagara-area health unit could now be open to judicial review due to the use of the bylaw by the Hamilton Niagara Haldimand Brant Local Health Integration Network. In response to Marin's report, Hudak committed to abolish the LHINs and redirect $200 million in savings back to the health system.

On May 26, 2011, Hudak proposed a highly controversial plan to implement mandatory street-cleaning "work gangs" made up of provincial inmates, replacing current voluntary programs. This program was described as modern-day "chain gangs" by Hudak's critics, who pointed out that such a program would be costly to implement and could pose significant security risks to the public, along with eliminating these entry-level jobs from the paid workforce.

A Nanos Research poll released on August 16, 2011, found that fewer than one in four voters describe Hudak as the most trustworthy leader. Among women, the number was one in five.

Hudak faced criticism from party members after the Progressive Conservatives won only one out of five seats being contested in a series of by-elections on August 1, 2013. 10 party members petitioned the party to allow a leadership review at the party's policy convention in the fall and two MPPs, Frank Klees and Randy Hillier, have called on Hudak to allow the review to proceed.

In April 2014, Hudak and fellow MPP Lisa MacLeod were being sued for libel by Ontario Premier Kathleen Wynne for saying she “oversaw and possibly ordered the criminal destruction of [gas plant] documents.” Wynne denies she had any knowledge or involvement of the allegations made. Hudak and the PC face a subsequent lawsuit over statements made on its website brought forward by the Working Families Coalition. The group has funded attack ads (with union financial backing), and been accused by the PC party of supporting the Liberal Party.

=== 2011 election ===
Hudak's Progressive Conservatives consistently led in public opinion polls for months leading up to the October 6, 2011, provincial election. However, by the time the writ was dropped for the election the party's lead had begun to shrink. The Liberal Party made gains in polling during the election campaign and on election night won a minority government, one seat shy of a majority government. The Liberals took 53 seats, the Tories won 37 and the NDP took 17 seats.

=== 2014 election and resignation ===
Following his party's defeat in the 2011 election, Hudak invited Tom Long, Leslie Noble and other architects of the party's 1995 victory to design his campaign for the following election. Hudak's Conservatives ran on a platform promising to create a million jobs and to reduce the public service by 100,000 jobs through attrition - resulting in his math being challenged by the other parties and various analysts.

Hudak won his Niagara West-Glanbrook seat while his party lost 10 seats. After the election, several Conservative MPPs said they had not known about Hudak's "Million Job Plan" ahead of time and criticized Hudak for not consulting his caucus about the election platform he was running on. Hudak announced he would resign as leader of the Progressive Conservative Party after losing to Kathleen Wynne's Liberals, which secured a majority government, but said he will continue as an MPP.

Hudak did not take a position in the Official Opposition Shadow Cabinet named by his interim successor, Jim Wilson.

=== Backbench MPP ===
In October 2015, Hudak tabled a private member's bill that would legalize ridesharing companies such as Uber, property rental services such as Airbnb, and parking-sharing services such as Rover at the provincial level and with provincial regulatory standards.

Hudak announced on August 9, 2016, that he would be resigning his seat in the Ontario legislature, effective September 16, 2016, to become the chief executive officer of the Ontario Real Estate Association.

=== Political views ===
Numerous pundits have labelled Hudak as a blue Tory who is on the right wing of the PC Party of Ontario, though Hudak has called himself a "purple Tory". He has proposed income splitting for young couples and families, and campaigned to scrap the Human Rights Tribunal of Ontario, replacing it with a courts-based system of settling complaints. Hudak's wife, Deb Hutton, was a senior adviser to Mike Harris, and he is seen by some as the new standard-bearer for the Mike Harris Common Sense Revolution.

When he was running for the PC leadership in 2009, Hudak told the Association for Reformed Political Action that he is anti-abortion and had signed petitions calling for the defunding of abortions. However, on July 18, 2011, during the lead-up to the October 6 provincial election, Hudak stated that he "may have" signed petitions calling for an end to abortion funding. He refused to answer follow-up questions from media regarding his views on abortion, but promised that he would not reopen the abortion debate if elected premier.

In December 2012, Hudak announced that if he were to form government he would allow beer, wine and spirits to be sold at corner stores throughout the province. Hudak said he would sell part of the Liquor Control Board of Ontario or some of its stores to the private sector and is open to the idea of a full sell-off of the LCBO. Although the McGuinty government had rejected the idea of selling alcohol in corner stores in the summer of 2012, weeks after Hudak's announcement, they launched a pilot project to allow alcohol to be sold in supermarkets.

In April 2013, Hudak met with the National Post's editorial board to discuss education issues in Ontario. Among other things, he was asked about Ontario's publicly funded Roman Catholic school system, which operates in parallel with the public system. Hudak simply stated that parents from other religions or denominations have "legitimate concerns".

== Post-MPP Career ==
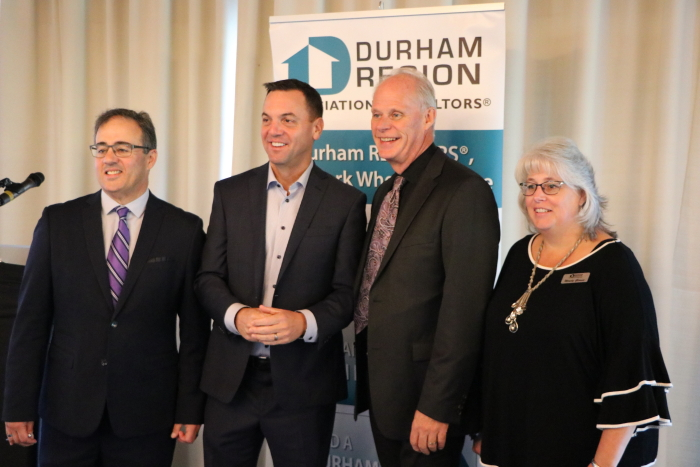
Hudak with Oshawa Mayor Dan Carter, in 2019.

After the Ontario legislature in 2016, Hudak became the CEO of the Ontario Real Estate Association. In 2021 it was announced that he would chair a provincial committee to promote tourism following COVID-19 lockdowns.

== Personal life ==
Hudak married Deb Hutton on October 5, 2002 and together they have two daughters, Miller and Maitland.

He is an avid Twitter, Facebook, and social media enthusiast. In 2010, he became the first Canadian politician to have his own iPhone application.
