= Niagara West =

Niagara West may refer to:

- Niagara West (federal electoral district)
- Niagara West (provincial electoral district)
