= Shirley Coppen =

Canadian politician

The Honourable Shirley Coppen ECO

Ontario MPP
- In office 1990–1995
- Preceded by: Ray Haggerty
- Succeeded by: Tim Hudak
- Constituency: Niagara South

Personal details
- Born: 1946 (age 79–80) Port Colborne, Ontario
- Party: New Democrat
- Children: 2
- Occupation: Nursing assistant

Shirley Coppen (born c. 1946) is former politician in Ontario, Canada. She served as a New Democratic Party member of the Legislative Assembly of Ontario from 1990 to 1995 who represented the riding of Niagara South. She served as a cabinet minister in the government of Bob Rae.

== Background ==
Coppen was educated at Niagara College, in the Labour Studies program. She was a registered nursing assistant at Welland County General Hospital for eighteen years, and served as president of the Welland and District Labour Council from 1986 to 1990. She also served as an executive on the Ontario Federation of Labour.

== Politics ==
She was elected to the Ontario legislature in the 1990 provincial election, defeating Liberal candidate John Lopinski by almost 4,000 votes in the riding of Niagara South. The NDP won a majority government and Coppen was named as a minister without portfolio and Chief Government Whip on October 1, 1990. Her responsibilities as whip included ensuring that members were present for votes in both the legislature and in committee. During her first term in office, she never lost a vote. She also acted as Deputy House Leader.

In April 1992, Coppen was portrayed in the media as using her position as whip to reward hard working members with routine trips to study the parliamentary process. She said, "I take a look at who's gone that little extra mile and it's my one way of rewarding them." One odd request was that she asked members to bring her back a souvenir bell for her collection. At least two MPPs brought back bells for which she reimbursed them. Coppen became known as the "Bell Woman" of the legislature. Liberal member Greg Sorbara complained that Coppen was doling out junkets as favours. Premier Bob Rae said that this was nonsense. "That's a joke," he said. "I can't imagine anyone taking that as a serious kind of comment."

On February 3, 1993, she lost her job as chief government whip but was given the job as a junior minister responsible for Culture, Tourism and Recreation.

In February 1993, it was reported that Coppen was receiving money from a disability pension for injuries she received before politics. Coppen who walks with a cane said she was receiving $83 a month since she strained her neck and shoulders 10 years ago trying to catch a patient falling out of bed in a psychiatric hospital. She said, "I can't sit in certain positions, sleep in certain positions and it's very difficult to drive a car." Government pensions for injured workers are normally awarded for life.

On October 21, 1994, she was appointed as Minister of Labour, replacing the retiring Robert W. Mackenzie. Opposition critic Steve Mahoney argued that the appointment placed her in a conflict of interest due to her past injury. Coppen who arrived at the swearing in ceremony in a wheelchair said, "I do understand what people have to go through to get approved for a disability pension." She dismissed the criticism. "I just got sworn in 10 minutes ago. Let's be realistic. I'm going to have to sit down and start Monday morning," she said. Rae derided the criticism as well. He said, "If you followed their (Liberal) logic, the minister of veterans' affairs couldn't be a veteran, couldn't be receiving a veteran's pension."

In December 1994, Coppen stated that the government's labour laws might affect the major league baseball strike. She said the Toronto Blue Jays would not be allowed to bring in 'scab' players. The situation was later rendered moot when the season was cancelled instead.

The NDP were defeated in the 1995 provincial election, and Coppen finished third in her bid for re-election, losing to Progressive Conservative Tim Hudak.

=== Cabinet positions ===
Rae ministry, Province of Ontario (1990–1995)
Cabinet post (1)
Predecessor	Office	Successor
Bob Mackenzie	Minister of Labour; 1994–1995	Elizabeth Witmer
Special Parliamentary Responsibilities
Predecessor	Title	Successor
Joan Smith	Chief Government Whip; 1990–1993	Fred Wilson
