= Paul Rhodes =

Canadian political consultant

Paul Rhodes (born 1956) is a Canadian political strategist. He was communications director for the Ontario Progressive Conservative Party during the 1995, 1999 and 2003 elections, and communications director for Ontario Premier Mike Harris from 1995 to 1997. Rhodes was an architect of the Common Sense Revolution, the policy platform which ushered the Ontario Progressive Conservative Party into government in 1995.

Before entering politics, Rhodes was a reporter for CTV's affiliate in Kitchener, CKCO.
