= Welland South =

Former provincial electoral district in Ontario, Canada

Ontario electoral district

Defunct provincial electoral district
- Legislature: Legislative Assembly of Ontario
- District created: 1967
- District abolished: 1975
- First contested: 1967
- Last contested: 1971

Welland South was a provincial electoral district in Ontario, Canada. It existed from 1967 to 1975, when it was abolished when the riding was redistributed into Erie. It consisted of the southern areas of the city of Welland. It was only represented by Liberal Ray Haggerty.

== Members of Provincial Parliament ==
Welland South
Assembly	Years	Member	Party
Riding created out of Welland
28th	1967–1971	Ray Haggerty	Liberal
29th	1971–1975	Ray Haggerty	Liberal
Riding dissolved into Erie

== See also ==
- List of Ontario provincial electoral districts
- Canadian provincial electoral districts
