= Ray Haggerty =

Canadian politician

Ontario MPP
- In office 1967–1990
- Preceded by: New riding, 1987 (Note: Haggerty was the sole member for the ridings of Welland South, 1967-1975 and Erie, 1975-1987.)
- Succeeded by: Shirley Coppen
- Constituency: Niagara South

Personal details
- Born: April 6, 1923 Port Colborne, Ontario, Canada
- Died: April 23, 2011 (aged 88) Welland, Ontario, Canada
- Party: Liberal
- Spouse: Marie
- Children: 3
- Occupation: Machinist

Raymond Louis Haggerty (April 6, 1923 – April 23, 2011) was a politician in Ontario, Canada. He was a Liberal member of the Legislative Assembly of Ontario from 1967 to 1990 who represented the ridings of Welland South, Erie and Niagara South. He was also involved in municipal politics in the Welland area from 1956 to 1967.

== Background ==
Haggerty was born in Port Colborne, Ontario and he was educated at Port Colborne High School. He worked as a machinist before entering politics. He and his wife Marie raised three children. He served as president of the Niagara South Plowman's Association.

== Politics ==
He served as a councillor in Bertie Township in 1956-57, and was its deputy reeve from 1960 to 1967. He was also a councillor in Welland from 1960 to 1967.

He was elected to the Ontario legislature in the 1967 provincial election, defeating Progressive Conservative candidate Gordon Taylor by 107 votes in the new riding of Welland South. In the 1971 election, he was re-elected by 438 votes. Haggerty was returned by much greater majorities in Erie in the elections of 1975, 1977, 1981, 1985 and 1987. He did not seek re-election in 1990.

During his 23 year tenure, he served as a backbench supporter to Liberal leaders Bob Nixon, Stuart Smith and David Peterson. When the Liberals took office in 1985 he served as a parliamentary assistant to several ministries including Government Services and Consumer and Commercial Relations.
