= Erie (provincial electoral district) =

Former provincial electoral district in Ontario, Canada

Ontario electoral district

Defunct provincial electoral district
- Legislature: Legislative Assembly of Ontario
- District created: 1974
- District abolished: 1986
- First contested: 1975
- Last contested: 1985

Erie was a provincial electoral district in the Niagara region of Ontario, Canada. It existed from 1975 to 1987, when it was abolished when the riding was redistributed to Niagara South. It consisted of the federal electoral district of the same name. It was only represented by Liberal Ray Haggerty.

== Members of Provincial Parliament ==
Erie
Assembly	Years	Member	Party
Riding created out of Welland South
30th	1975–1977	Ray Haggerty	Liberal
31st	1977–1981	Ray Haggerty	Liberal
32nd	1981–1985	Ray Haggerty	Liberal
33rd	1985–1987	Ray Haggerty	Liberal
Riding dissolved into Niagara South

== Election results ==
1985 Ontario general election
Party	Candidate	Votes	%	±%
Liberal	Ray Haggerty	10,926	54.57	+4.75
Progressive Conservative	Stan Pettit	5,904	29.49	–0.37
New Democratic	Shirley Summers	3,191	15.94	–4.38
Total valid votes		20,021	99.34	
Total rejected ballots		134	0.66	+0.22
Turnout		20,155	60.83	+6.36
Eligible voters		33,132		
Liberal hold		Swing		+2.56
Source: Elections Ontario

1981 Ontario general election
Party	Candidate	Votes	%	±%
Liberal	Ray Haggerty	8,796	49.83	+1.11
Progressive Conservative	Clay McKnight	5,271	29.86	+1.47
New Democratic	Barrie MacLeod	3,586	20.31	–2.58
Total valid votes		17,653	99.56	
Total rejected ballots		78	0.44	–0.09
Turnout		17,731	54.47	–10.96
Eligible voters		32,549		
Liberal hold		Swing		–0.18
Source: Elections Ontario

1977 Ontario general election
Party	Candidate	Votes	%	±%
Liberal	Ray Haggerty	10,008	48.71	+3.44
Progressive Conservative	Greg Parker	5,833	28.39	+6.38
New Democratic	Barrie MacLeod	4,704	22.90	–9.82
Total valid votes		20,545	99.47	
Total rejected ballots		109	0.53	+0.10
Turnout		20,654	65.44	–3.81
Eligible voters		31,564		
Liberal hold		Swing		–1.47
Source: Elections Ontario

1975 Ontario general election
Party	Candidate	Votes	%	±%
Liberal	Ray Haggerty	9,556	45.27	–
New Democratic	Maurice Keck	6,906	32.72	–
Progressive Conservative	John Buscarino	4,646	22.01	–
Total valid votes		21,108	99.58	
Total rejected ballots		90	0.42	–
Turnout		21,198	69.24	–
Eligible voters		30,615		
Liberal pickup new district.				
Source: Elections Ontario

== See also ==
- List of Ontario provincial electoral districts
- Canadian provincial electoral districts
