= List of Ontario federal electoral districts =

Ontario's federal electoral districts, colloquially calls federal ridings, are the electoral districts in the Canadian province of Ontario defined for the purpose of electing political representatives to the Canadian national parliament. Each federal riding elects one representative, a Member of Parliament, to the federal House of Commons. There are currently 123 such districts in Ontario. These districts are defined by the 2023 Representation Order issued in the name of Canada's Chief Electoral Officer, who is the head of Elections Canada following the federal redistribution process conducted in 2022, and have been represented in the House of commons since the 2025 federal election.

== Relations to provincial electoral districts ==
Prior to the 2025 general election, the electoral boundary of the 110 electoral districts in Southern Ontario were the same as 110 provincial electoral districts. Progressive Conservative Premier Doug Ford had declined to enact legislation to adopt the federal electoral boundaries, which had been the practice in Ontario for close to thirty years. As of June 2026, the Ford ministry had not indicated when or whether it would resume the practice, nor had it proposed any alternative retribution mechanism or plan. Accordingly, representation in the provincial legislature continues to be based on population statistics from the 2011 census.

Since the enactment of the Fewer Politicians Act, 1996 by the ministry of former Progressive Conservative Premier Mike Harris, Ontario, Ontario had ended the practice of conducting its own separate provincial-wide redistribution processes and simply adopted the federal electoral boundary in a provincial election contested after new boundary were adopted and contested in a federal general election. The subsequent Liberal McGuinty ministry and Wynne ministry adjusted the process to maintain representation level for Northern Ontario and to increase representation of indigenous communities residing in the sparsely populated far north of the province. For more than 90% of the province however, provincial representation had consistently followed federal representation. As follows:

- Ontario's 103 federal electoral districts defined by the 1996 representation order, first contested in the 1997 federal election, were adopted and contested in the 1999 Ontario election
- 96 of Ontario's 106 federal electoral districts defined by the 2003 representation order, first contested in the 2004 federal election, were adopted and contested in the 2007 Ontario election, along with 11 Northern Ontario districts
- 111 of Ontario's 121 federal electoral districts defined by the 2013 representation order, first contested in the 2015 federal election, were adopted in the 2018 Ontario election, along with 13 Northern Ontario districts.

Accordingly, more than 90% of Ontarians were represented by MPs and MPPs with identical districts between 1999 and 2004, between 2007 and 2015 and again between 2015 until 2025.

== Change in numbers ==
As the provinces with the biggest population, Ontario has had the largest number of electoral districts, and consequently the most number of MPs of all provinces, since Canada was formed in 1867. Accordingly, while the province have not always determined the outcome of national election, political leaders and parties must at least be competitive in Ontario to be able to form national government. The province's proportion of seats in parliament however fluctuated over the years, from the high of 45% at Confederation in 1867, through period in the 1950s with as long as 31% to the current proportion of 35.5%, slightly below its population share within Canada, which stood at 38% as of the 2021 census.

== Current electoral districts ==
The following electoral districts are currently represented in the House of Commons. They are defined by the 2023 Representation Order, which was determined by the 2022 federal redistribution process conducted basing on the 2021 census. They have been represented in the House of commons since the 2025 federal election, the first general election held since the conclusion of the 2022 federal redistribution process. For a list of the members elected in 2025 (or any byelection since) to represent these electoral districts in the 45th Parliament, the parliament currently in office, please refer to the Ontario.section of the article with the 45th Parliament's list of members.

- Ajax
- Algonquin—Renfrew—Pembroke
- Aurora—Oak Ridges—Richmond Hill
- Barrie South—Innisfil
- Barrie—Springwater—Oro-Medonte
- Bay of Quinte
- Beaches—East York
- Bowmanville—Oshawa North
- Brampton Centre
- Brampton—Chinguacousy Park
- Brampton East
- Brampton North—Caledon
- Brampton South
- Brampton West
- Brantford—Brant South
- Bruce—Grey—Owen Sound
- Burlington
- Burlington North—Milton West
- Cambridge
- Carleton
- Chatham-Kent—Leamington
- Davenport
- Don Valley North
- Don Valley West
- Dufferin—Caledon
- Eglinton—Lawrence
- Elgin—St. Thomas—London South
- Essex
- Etobicoke Centre
- Etobicoke—Lakeshore
- Etobicoke North
- Flamborough—Glanbrook—Brant North
- Guelph
- Haldimand—Norfolk
- Haliburton—Kawartha Lakes
- Hamilton Centre
- Hamilton East—Stoney Creek
- Hamilton Mountain
- Hamilton West—Ancaster—Dundas
- Hastings—Lennox and Addington—Tyendinaga
- Humber River—Black Creek
- Huron—Bruce
- Kanata
- Kapuskasing—Timmins—Mushkegowuk
- Kenora—Kiiwetinoong
- Kingston and the Islands
- King—Vaughan
- Kitchener Centre
- Kitchener—Conestoga
- Kitchener South—Hespeler
- Lanark—Frontenac
- Leeds—Grenville—Thousand Islands—Rideau Lakes
- London Centre
- London—Fanshawe
- London West
- Markham—Stouffville
- Markham—Thornhill
- Markham—Unionville
- Middlesex—London
- Milton East—Halton Hills South
- Mississauga Centre
- Mississauga East—Cooksville
- Mississauga—Erin Mills
- Mississauga—Lakeshore
- Mississauga—Malton
- Mississauga—Streetsville
- Nepean
- Newmarket—Aurora
- Niagara Falls—Niagara-on-the-Lake
- Niagara South
- Niagara West
- Nipissing—Timiskaming
- Northumberland—Clarke
- North York
- Oakville East
- Oakville West
- Orléans
- Oshawa
- Ottawa Centre
- Ottawa South
- Ottawa—Vanier—Gloucester
- Ottawa West—Nepean
- Oxford
- Parry Sound—Muskoka
- Perth—Wellington
- Peterborough
- Pickering—Brooklin
- Prescott—Russell—Cumberland
- Richmond Hill South
- Sarnia—Lambton—Bkejwanong
- Sault Ste. Marie—Algoma
- Scarborough—Agincourt
- Scarborough Centre—Don Valley East
- Scarborough—Guildwood—Rouge Park
- Scarborough North
- Scarborough Southwest
- Scarborough—Woburn
- Simcoe—Grey
- Simcoe North
- Spadina—Harbourfront
- St. Catharines
- Stormont—Dundas—Glengarry
- Sudbury
- Sudbury East—Manitoulin—Nickel Belt
- Taiaiako'n—Parkdale—High Park
- Thornhill
- Thunder Bay—Rainy River
- Thunder Bay—Superior North
- Toronto Centre
- Toronto—Danforth
- Toronto—St. Paul's
- University—Rosedale
- Vaughan—Woodbridge
- Waterloo
- Wellington—Halton Hills North
- Whitby
- Willowdale
- Windsor—Tecumseh—Lakeshore
- Windsor West
- York—Durham
- York South—Weston—Etobicoke
- York—South Simcoe

== See also ==
- List of Ontario provincial electoral districts
