= List of Ontario provincial electoral districts =

The Ontario provincial electoral districts each elect one representative to the Legislative Assembly of Ontario. They are MPPs, Members of Provincial Parliament. Before 2025, these districts were coterminous with the federal electoral districts, based on the 2013 Representation Order as defined by Elections Canada. The exception was Northern Ontario, whose districts were not equivalent to their federal counterparts, since the provincial government did not want to decrease the number of districts in Northern Ontario. Despite Ontario's federal ridings changing substantially in the 2022 Canadian federal electoral redistribution, the provincial ridings remained unchanged, leading to Ontario's provincial and federal ridings once again being separate as of the 2025 provincial and federal elections. Election administration is managed by Elections Ontario. In late 2025 the Ford government passed new legislation which repealed fixed election date laws in Ontario, moving the upcoming 45th provincial election from 2029 to 2030.

== Current electoral districts ==
The following 124 electoral districts are currently represented in the provincial legislative assembly. The average riding population was 108,482 as of 2016.

= Seat held by PCPO

= Seat held by ONDP

= Seat held by OLP

= Seat held by GPO

= Seat held by Independent

Electoral district	Created	First contested	Population	MPP
Ajax	2015	2018	119,677	Rob Cerjanec
Algoma—Manitoulin	1934	1934	68,480	Bill Rosenberg
Aurora—Oak Ridges—Richmond Hill	2015	2018	115,225	Michael Parsa
Barrie—Innisfil	2015	2018	109,285	Andrea Khanjin
Barrie—Springwater—Oro-Medonte	2015	2018	100,785	Doug Downey
Bay of Quinte	2015	2018	109,735	Tyler Allsopp
Beaches—East York	1996	1999	109,465	Mary-Margaret McMahon
Brampton Centre	2015	2018	102,275	Charmaine Williams
Brampton East	2015	2018	122,000	Hardeep Grewal
Brampton North	2015	2018	118,180	Graham McGregor
Brampton South	2015	2018	121,188	Prabmeet Sarkaria
Brampton West	2004	2007	130,005	Amarjot Sandhu
Brantford—Brant	1999	1999	130,300	Will Bouma
Bruce—Grey—Owen Sound	1999	1999	107,675	Paul Vickers
Burlington	1999	1999	123,185	Natalie Pierre
Cambridge	1975	1979	115,460	Brian Riddell
Carleton	2015	2018	102,918	George Darouze
Chatham-Kent—Leamington	1999	1999	109,620	Trevor Jones
Davenport	1996	1999	108,475	Marit Stiles
Don Valley East	1999	1999	94,575	Adil Shamji
Don Valley North	2015	2018	110,080	Jonathan Tsao
Don Valley West	1999	1999	102,510	Stephanie Bowman
Dufferin—Caledon	1987	1988	128,240	Sylvia Jones
Durham	1999	1999	130,870	Todd McCarthy
Eglinton—Lawrence	1999	1999	114,400	Michelle Cooper
Elgin—Middlesex—London	1999	1999	115,055	Rob Flack
Essex	1999	1999	125,440	Anthony Leardi
Etobicoke Centre	1999	1999	118,020	Kinga Surma
Etobicoke—Lakeshore	1987	1988	129,080	Lee Fairclough
Etobicoke North	1999	1999	118,045	Doug Ford
Flamborough—Glanbrook	2015	2018	111,070	Donna Skelly
Glengarry—Prescott—Russell	1999	1999	109,980	Stéphane Sarrazin
Guelph	2004	2007	131,790	Mike Schreiner
Haldimand—Norfolk	1999	1999	109,655	Bobbi Ann Brady
Haliburton—Kawartha Lakes—Brock	1999	1999	113,960	Laurie Scott
Hamilton Centre	1926	1926	100,100	Robin Lennox
Hamilton East—Stoney Creek	2006	2007	107,845	Neil Lumsden
Hamilton Mountain	1976	1977	104,875	Monica Ciriello
Hamilton West—Ancaster—Dundas	2015	2018	113,025	Sandy Shaw
Hastings—Lennox and Addington	2015	2018	94,333	Ric Bresee
Humber River—Black Creek	1999	1999	108,035	Tom Rakocevic
Huron—Bruce	1952	1953	106,570	Lisa Thompson
Kanata—Carleton	2015	2018	110,960	Karen McCrimmon
Kenora—Rainy River	1999	1999	53,027	Greg Rickford
Kingston and the Islands	1966	1967	117,545	Ted Hsu
King—Vaughan	2015	2018	131,995	Stephen Lecce
Kitchener Centre	1999	1999	105,260	Aislinn Clancy
Kitchener—Conestoga	2006	2007	100,705	Mike Harris Jr.
Kitchener South—Hespeler	2015	2018	105,305	Jess Dixon
Kiiwetinoong	2017	2018	32,987	Sol Mamakwa
Lambton—Kent—Middlesex	1999	1999	105,335	Steve Pinsonneault
Lanark—Frontenac—Kingston	2015	2018	101,635	John Jordan
Leeds—Grenville—Thousand Islands and Rideau Lakes	1986	1987	100,545	Steve Clark
London—Fanshawe	1999	1999	119,467	Teresa Armstrong
London North Centre	1999	1999	125,360	Terence Kernaghan
London West	1999	1999	126,110	Peggy Sattler
Markham—Stouffville	2015	2018	126,060	Paul Calandra
Markham—Thornhill	2015	2018	99,075	Logan Kanapathi
Markham—Unionville	2003	2007	123,320	Billy Pang
Milton	2015	2018	114,090	Zee Hamid
Mississauga Centre	1996	1999	124,845	Natalia Kusendova
Mississauga East—Cooksville	2003	2007	120,205	Silvia Gualtieri
Mississauga—Erin Mills	2015	2018	120,205	Sheref Sabawy
Mississauga—Lakeshore	2015	2018	117,444	Rudy Cuzzetto
Mississauga—Malton	2015	2018	118,240	Deepak Anand
Mississauga—Streetsville	2003	2007	118,305	Nina Tangri
Mushkegowuk—James Bay	2017	2018	30,037	Guy Bourgouin
Nepean	1987	2018	119,115	Tyler Watt
Newmarket—Aurora	2006	2007	117,415	Dawn Gallagher Murphy
Niagara Centre	1914	1914	109,070	Jeff Burch
Niagara Falls	1914	1914	136,290	Wayne Gates
Niagara West	2004	2007	90,840	Sam Oosterhoff
Nickel Belt	1952	1955	84,520	France Gélinas
Nipissing	1890	1890	75,060	Vic Fedeli
Northumberland—Peterborough South	2006	2007	112,412	David Piccini
Oakville	1999	1999	120,920	Stephen Crawford
Oakville North—Burlington	2015	2018	129,078	Effie Triantafilopoulos
Orléans	1999	1999	128,280	Stephen Blais
Oshawa	1952	1955	126,765	Jennifer French
Ottawa Centre	1966	1968	118,040	Catherine McKenney
Ottawa South	1925	1926	121,055	John Fraser
Ottawa—Vanier	1908	1908	111,510	Lucille Collard
Ottawa West—Nepean	1999	1999	111,835	Chandra Pasma
Oxford	1999	1999	113,790	Ernie Hardeman
Parkdale—High Park	1996	1999	108,805	Alexa Gilmour
Parry Sound—Muskoka	1999	1999	94,400	Graydon Smith
Perth—Wellington	2006	2007	107,905	Matthew Rae
Peterborough—Kawartha	1934	1934	118,175	Dave Smith
Pickering—Uxbridge	2015	2018	112,945	Peter Bethlenfalvy
Renfrew—Nipissing—Pembroke	1999	1999	103,495	Billy Denault
Richmond Hill	2003	2007	110,180	Daisy Wai
St. Catharines	1966	1967	111,690	Jennie Stevens
Sarnia—Lambton	1999	1999	105,335	Bob Bailey
Sault Ste. Marie	1890	1890	73,370	Chris Scott
Scarborough—Agincourt	1987	1987	105,540	Aris Babikian
Scarborough Centre	1963	1963	112,600	David Smith
Scarborough—Guildwood	2006	2007	102,390	Andrea Hazell
Scarborough North	1963	1963	98,805	Raymond Cho
Scarborough—Rouge Park	2015	2018	102,275	Vijay Thanigasalam
Scarborough Southwest	1999	1999	110,280	Doly Begum
Simcoe—Grey	1999	1999	129,940	Brian Saunderson
Simcoe North	1999	1999	111,335	Jill Dunlop
Spadina—Fort York	2015	2018	115,510	Chris Glover
Stormont—Dundas—South Glengarry	2004	2007	103,320	Nolan Quinn
Sudbury	1905	1908	80,840	Jamie West
Thornhill	1999	1999	112,720	Laura Smith
Thunder Bay—Atikokan	1999	1999	75,920	Kevin Holland
Thunder Bay—Superior North	1999	1999	70,475	Lise Vaugeois
Timiskaming—Cochrane	1999	1999	67,290	John Vanthof
Timmins	1999	1999	41,788	George Pirie
Toronto Centre	1999	1999	103,805	Kristyn Wong-Tam
Toronto—Danforth	1999	1999	106,880	Peter Tabuns
Toronto—St. Paul's	1999	1999	107,900	Stephanie Smyth
University—Rosedale	2015	2018	104,315	Jessica Bell
Vaughan—Woodbridge	2015	2018	105,228	Michael Tibollo
Waterloo	2015	2018	110,134	Catherine Fife
Wellington—Halton Hills	2004	2007	120,981	Joseph Racinsky
Whitby	2015	2018	128,377	Lorne Coe
Willowdale	1987	1987	118,805	Stan Cho
Windsor—Tecumseh	1996	1999	117,430	Andrew Dowie
Windsor West	1996	1999	122,219	Lisa Gretzky
York Centre	1999	1999	104,320	Michael Kerzner
York South—Weston	1999	1999	114,458	Mohamed Firin
York—Simcoe	2006	2007	104,015	Susan Lahey

Note

1. Population information from 2016 Census or Elections Ontario.
2. Election results from Elections Ontario.

== Defunct electoral districts ==
=== Toronto ===
- Armourdale
- Beaches
- Beaches—Woodbine
- Bellwoods
- Bracondale
- Brockton
- Don Mills
- Dovercourt
- Downsview
- Eglinton
- Etobicoke
- Etobicoke—Humber
- Etobicoke—Rexdale
- Etobicoke West
- Forest Hill
- Fort York
- Greenwood
- High Park
- High Park—Swansea
- Humber
- Lakeshore
- Oakwood
- Oriole
- Parkdale
- Riverdale
- Scarborough East
- Scarborough—Ellesmere
- Scarborough North
- Scarborough West
- St. Andrew
- St. Andrew—St. Patrick
- St. David
- St. George
- St. George—St. David
- St. Patrick
- Toronto
- Toronto Northeast
- Toronto Northwest
- Toronto Southeast
- Toronto Southwest
- Wilson Heights
- Woodbine
- York East
- York Mills
- York South
- York-Forest Hill
- York—Scarborough
- Yorkview
- York—Humber

=== GTA ===
- Bramalea—Gore—Malton—Springdale
- Brampton Centre
- Brampton North
- Brampton South
- Brampton West—Mississauga
- Durham Centre
- Durham East
- Durham North
- Durham West
- Durham—York
- Markham
- Mississauga Centre
- Mississauga East
- Mississauga North
- Mississauga West
- Pickering—Ajax—Uxbridge
- Vaughan—King—Aurora
- Whitby—Ajax
- York North

=== Rest of province ===
- Algoma
- Ancaster
- Barrie—Simcoe—Bradford
- Brant North
- Bruce
- Burlington South
- Carleton East
- Carleton—Grenville
- Chatham—Kent
- Cochrane North
- Cochrane South
- Cornwall
- Dufferin—Peel—Wellington—Grey
- Erie
- Erie—Lincoln
- Frontenac-Addington
- Guelph—Wellington
- Haldimand—Norfolk—Brant
- Halton
- Halton Centre
- Halton East
- Halton North
- Halton West
- Halton—Burlington
- Hamilton East
- Hamilton West
- Hamilton—Wentworth
- Hastings—Frontenac—Lennox and Addington
- Huron
- Huron Centre
- Huron East
- Huron North
- Huron West
- Kenora
- Kent—Elgin
- Kitchener—Wilmot
- Lake Nipigon
- Lanark
- Lanark—Carlton
- Lawrence
- Lincoln
- London Centre
- London North
- London South
- Manitoulin
- Muskoka
- Muskoka–Georgian Bay
- Niagara
- Niagara Centre
- Niagara South
- Nipissing East
- Nipissing West
- Oakville South
- Ottawa
- Ottawa–Rideau
- Ottawa North*
- Ottawa South
- Ottawa West
- Oxford North
- Oxford South
- Perth
- Prescott and Russell
- Quinte
- Renfrew North
- Renfrew South
- Simcoe Centre
- Simcoe West
- St. Catharines—Brock
- Sturgeon Falls
- Sudbury East
- Timiskaming
- Thunder Bay
- Victoria-Haliburton
- Waterloo North
- Waterloo South
- Welland South
- Welland—Thorold
- Wellington East
- Wellington—Dufferin—Peel
- Wellington South
- Wellington West
- Wentworth North
- Windsor
- Windsor East
- Windsor—Sandwich

== See also ==
- Canadian provincial electoral districts
- List of Ontario general elections
