= Niagara South =

Former provincial electoral district in Ontario, Canada

Ontario electoral district

Defunct provincial electoral district
- Legislature: Legislative Assembly of Ontario
- District created: 1986
- District abolished: 1996
- First contested: 1987
- Last contested: 1995

Niagara South was a provincial electoral district in Ontario, Canada. It existed from 1987 to 1999, when it was abolished when ridings were redistributed to match their federal counterpart. It was created out of Erie and consisted of the southern areas of the Niagara Region.

== Members of Provincial Parliament ==
- Ray Haggerty (Liberal) (1987–1990)
- Shirley Coppen (New Democrat) (1990–1995)
- Tim Hudak (Progressive Conservative) (1995–1999)

Niagara South
Assembly	Years	Member	Party
Riding created out of Erie
34th	1987–1990	Ray Haggerty	Liberal
35th	1990–1995	Shirley Coppen	New Democratic
36th	1995–1999	Tim Hudak	Progressive Conservative
Riding dissolved into Niagara Centre

== Election results ==
1995 Ontario general election
Party	Candidate	Votes	%	±%
Progressive Conservative	Tim Hudak	8,815	38.24	+21.42
Liberal	Aubrey Foley	7,634	33.12	+2.95
New Democratic	Shirley Coppen	5,376	23.32	–23.23
Independent	Morton E. Sider	688	2.98	–
Family Coalition	Alfred Kiers	536	2.33	–
Total valid votes		23,049	98.87	
Total rejected, unmarked and declined ballots		264	1.13	–0.13
Turnout		23,313	60.14	–4.97
Eligible voters		38,767		
Progressive Conservative gain from New Democratic		Swing		+22.33
Source: Elections Ontario

1990 Ontario general election
Party	Candidate	Votes	%	±%
New Democratic	Shirley Coppen	11,161	46.56	+25.40
Liberal	John Lopinski	7,232	30.17	–26.33
Progressive Conservative	Doug Martin	4,032	16.82	–5.53
Confederation of Regions	Glen Hutton	1,547	6.45	–
Total valid votes		23,972	98.74	
Total rejected, unmarked and declined ballots		307	1.26	+0.26
Turnout		24,279	65.10	+8.98
Eligible voters		37,293		
New Democratic gain from Liberal		Swing		+15.47
Source: Elections Ontario

1987 Ontario general election
Party	Candidate	Votes	%
Liberal	Ray Haggerty	11,740	56.49
Progressive Conservative	Doug Martin	4,645	22.35
New Democratic	Camilla Gyorffy	4,396	21.15
Total valid votes		20,781	98.99
Total rejected ballots		211	1.01
Turnout		20,992	56.12
Eligible voters		37,404	
Liberal pickup new district.			
Source: Elections Ontario

== See also ==
- List of Ontario provincial electoral districts
- Canadian provincial electoral districts
