= Niagara West (provincial electoral district) =

Provincial electoral district in Ontario, Canada

Coordinates: 43.11°N 79.37°W

Ontario electoral district
- Niagara West in relation to Hamilton and Niagara area ridings

Provincial electoral district
- Legislature: Legislative Assembly of Ontario
MPP
Sam Oosterhoff
Progressive Conservative
- District created: 2015
- First contested: 2018
- Last contested: 2025

Demographics
- Population (2016): 90,840
- Electors (2018): 73,913
- Area (km²): 1,122
- Pop. density (per km²): 81
- Census division: Niagara
- Census subdivision(s): Grimsby, Lincoln, Pelham, St. Catharines, Wainfleet, West Lincoln

Niagara West is a provincial electoral district in south eastern Ontario, Canada. This riding was created following the creation of the new federal Niagara West riding in the 2012 federal electoral redistribution and includes portions of the former Niagara West—Glanbrook, Niagara Centre and St. Catharines ridings. It elected one member to the Legislative Assembly of Ontario in the 42nd general election.

== Members of Provincial Parliament ==
This riding has elected the following members of the Legislative Assembly of Ontario:

| Assembly | Years | Member | Party |
|---|---|---|---|
Riding created from Niagara West—Glanbrook, Niagara Centre and St. Catharines
| 42nd | 2018–2022 | Sam Oosterhoff | Progressive Conservative |
| 43rd | 2022–present | Sam Oosterhoff | Progressive Conservative |

== Election results ==
Winning party in each polling division of Niagara West at the 2025 Ontario general election

2025 Ontario general election
| Party | Candidate | Votes | % | ±% | Expenditures |
|---|---|---|---|---|---|
| Progressive Conservative | Sam Oosterhoff | 22,916 | 51.13 | +6.20 | $59,145 |
| Liberal | Shauna Boyle | 11,091 | 24.75 | +5.58 | $25,529 |
| New Democratic | Dave Augustyn | 7,312 | 16.32 | –4.39 | $28,159 |
| Green | Mark Harrison | 1,794 | 4.00 | –2.46 | $0 |
| New Blue | Aaron Albano | 676 | 1.51 | –1.12 | $1,393 |
| Ontario Party | Aaron Allison | 629 | 1.40 | –3.88 | $0 |
| Libertarian | Stefanos Karatopis | 326 | 0.73 | +0.11 | $0 |
| Populist | Jim Torma | 73 | 0.16 | –0.03 | $0 |
| Total valid votes/expense limit | | 44,817 | 99.38 | –0.02 | $132,253 |
| Total rejected, unmarked, and declined ballots | | 278 | 0.62 | +0.02 | |
| Turnout | | 45,095 | 55.58 | +2.42 | |
| Eligible voters | | 81,137 | | | |
| Progressive Conservative hold | | Swing | | +0.31 | |
Source: Elections Ontario

Winning party in each polling division of Niagara West at the 2022 Ontario general election

2022 Ontario general election
| Party | Candidate | Votes | % | ±% | Expenditures |
|---|---|---|---|---|---|
| Progressive Conservative | Sam Oosterhoff | 18,779 | 44.93 | –7.88 | $76,009 |
| New Democratic | Dave Augustyn | 8,658 | 20.71 | –9.09 | $63,171 |
| Liberal | Doug Joyner | 8,013 | 19.17 | +8.65 | $16,498 |
| Green | Laura Garner | 2,702 | 6.46 | +0.86 | $37 |
| Ontario Party | Dan Dale | 2,207 | 5.28 | N/A | $13,247 |
| New Blue | Chris Arnew | 1,098 | 2.63 | N/A | $5,952 |
| Libertarian | Stefanos Karatopis | 259 | 0.62 | –0.36 | none listed |
| Populist | Jim Torma | 80 | 0.19 | N/A | none listed |
| Total valid votes | | 41,796 | 99.40 | +0.64 | |
| Total rejected, unmarked, and declined ballots | | 251 | 0.60 | –0.64 | |
| Turnout | | 42,047 | 53.16 | –10.12 | |
| Eligible voters | | 78,138 | | | |
| Progressive Conservative hold | | Swing | | +0.61 | |
Source(s): "Summary of Valid Votes Cast for Each Candidate" (PDF). Elections Ontario. 2022. Archived from the original on 18 May 2023.; "Statistical Summary by Electoral District" (PDF). Elections Ontario. 2022. Archived from the original on 21 May 2023.; "Political Financing and Party Information". Elections Ontario.

2018 Ontario general election
| Party | Candidate | Votes | % | ±% | Expenditures |
|---|---|---|---|---|---|
| Progressive Conservative | Sam Oosterhoff | 24,394 | 52.81 | +5.01 | $45,217 |
| New Democratic | Curtis Fric | 13,769 | 29.81 | +10.31 | $11,680 |
| Liberal | Joe Kanee | 4,859 | 10.52 | –14.45 | $12,332 |
| Green | Jessica Tillmanns | 2,590 | 5.61 | –0.15 | $3,012 |
| Libertarian | Stefanos Karatopis | 451 | 0.98 | N/A | none listed |
| Multicultural | Geoffrey E. Barton | 127 | 0.27 | N/A | none listed |
| Total valid votes | | 46,190 | 98.76 | | |
| Total rejected, unmarked and declined ballots | | 579 | 1.24 | | |
| Turnout | | 46,769 | 63.28 | | |
| Eligible voters | | 73,913 | | | |
| Progressive Conservative notional hold | | Swing | | –2.65 | |
Source: Elections Ontario

2014 general election redistributed results
| Party | Vote | % |
|---|---|---|
| Progressive Conservative | 19,482 | 47.80 |
| Liberal | 10,185 | 24.97 |
| New Democratic | 7,948 | 19.50 |
| Green | 2,348 | 5.76 |
| Others | 803 | 1.97 |

== See also ==
- List of Ontario provincial electoral districts
- Canadian provincial electoral districts
