= Sam Oosterhoff =

Canadian politician (born 1997)

The Honourable Sam Oosterhoff ECO MPP
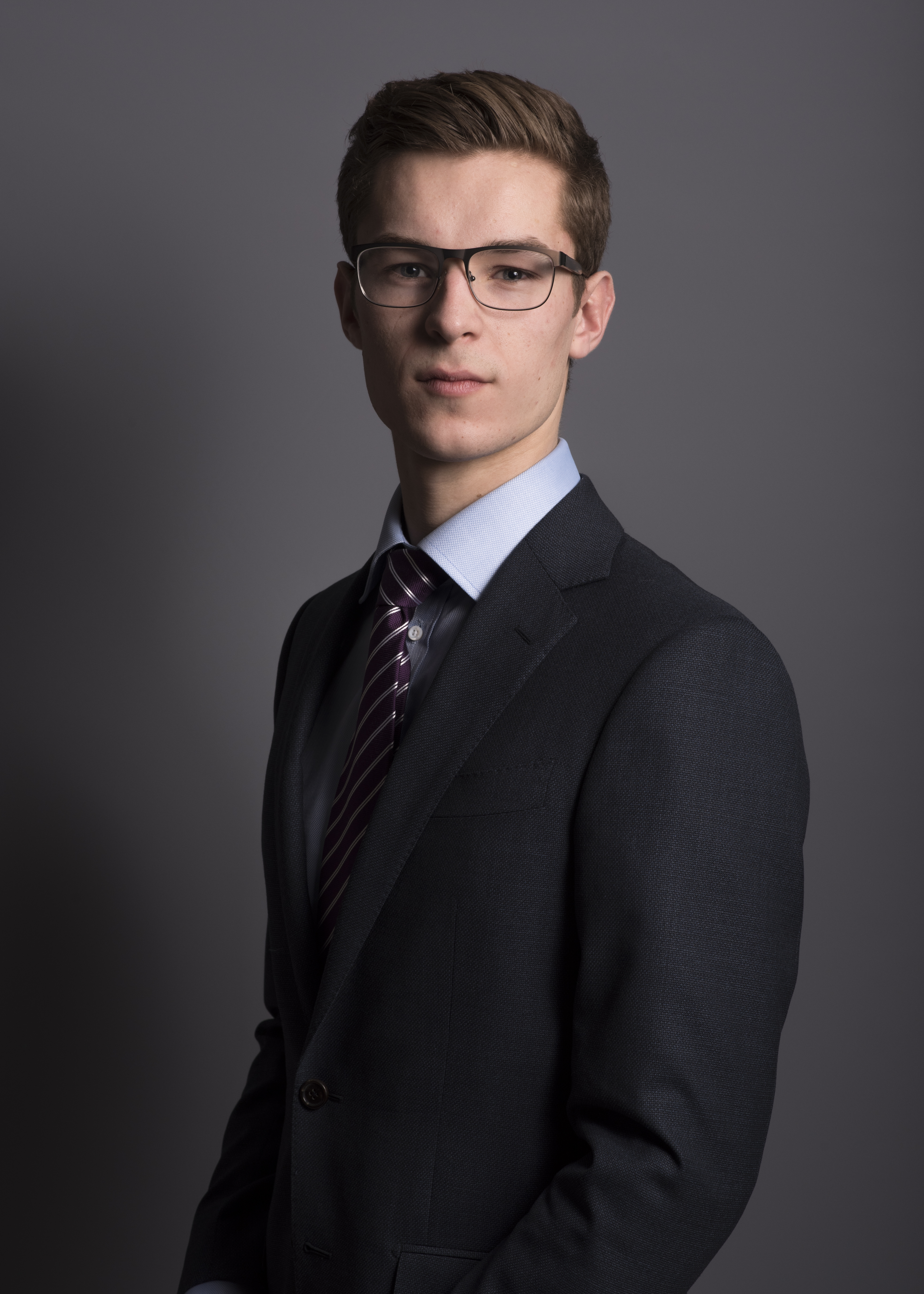
- Oosterhoff in 2017

Minister of Agriculture, Food, and Agribusiness
- Incumbent
- Assumed office September 10, 2026
- Premier: Doug Ford
- Preceded by: Trevor Jones

Ontario Associate Minister of Energy-Intensive Industries
- In office June 6, 2024 – September 10, 2026
- Premier: Doug Ford
- Preceded by: Position established
- Succeeded by: Matthew Rae

Member of the Ontario Provincial Parliament
- Incumbent
- Assumed office June 7, 2018
- Preceded by: Riding established
- Constituency: Niagara West
- In office November 17, 2016 – May 9, 2018
- Preceded by: Tim Hudak
- Succeeded by: Riding dissolved
- Constituency: Niagara West—Glanbrook

Personal details
- Born: Samuel Earl Oosterhoff; August 22, 1997 (age 29) Vineland, Ontario, Canada
- Party: Progressive Conservative
- Spouse: Keri Nicole Ludwig (m. 2019)
- Children: 2
- Education: Brock University; McMaster University (BA)
- Website: samoosterhoffmpp.ca

Samuel Earl Oosterhoff (/ɒstɛrhɒff/; OSTERHOFF; born August 22, 1997) is a Canadian politician who has been the member of Provincial Parliament (MPP) for Niagara West since 2018. A member of the Ontario Progressive Conservative (PC) Party, Oosterhoff serves as Minister of Agriculture, Food, and Agribusiness. He was previously Associate Minister of Energy-Intensive Industries in the Ontario Ministry of Energy and Mines from 2024 to 2026. First elected at the age of 19, Oosterhoff is the youngest MPP to ever be elected in Ontario, beating the previous record held by Reid Scott, a Co-operative Commonwealth Federation MPP in 1948 at the age of 21.

== Early life and career ==
Oosterhoff was born August 22, 1997 in Vineland, Ontario, to Carl Oosterhoff and Monica Oosterhoff (née Viersen). He was raised in Beamsville near Vineland, Ontario. He attended the local schools there and was residing there still with his parents at the time of the byelection.

His paternal grandfather, Richard Jacob "Jake" Oosterhoff (1936–2021), was born in Laaghalerveen in Drenthe, Netherlands. He moved to Canada in 1952, where his parents where farming. Oosterhoff is a member of the Canadian Reformed Church. He is primarily of Dutch descent.

Before being nominated, Oosterhoff had briefly worked as legislative assistant and policy analyst on Parliament Hill in Ottawa. At the time of his election, he was in the middle of his first year studying political science at Brock University, which he entered after being homeschooled. After his election, he planned to resume his studies in January 2017 with night classes and summer school.

== Political career ==
In October 2016, Oosterhoff was nominated as the Progressive Conservative candidate in Niagara West—Glanbrook to replace Tim Hudak, who resigned his seat that September. Former MP and current president of the Progressive Conservative Party of Ontario Rick Dykstra was the favoured candidate by both the party establishment and PC leader Patrick Brown, but Oosterhoff had more local support, including that of his church.

Social conservatives such as Charles McVety accused Brown of muzzling Oosterhoff during the campaign because of the candidate's opposition to the new sexual education curriculum. On November 17, 2016, Oosterhoff defeated New Democratic challenger Mike Thomas by 9,528 votes.

He was sworn in as an MPP on November 30, one day after Nathalie Des Rosiers, who also won a byelection on November 17, was sworn in. Critics said the delay was to keep Oosterhoff out of the legislature for a vote on Bill 28 which was unanimously passed on November 29. Bill 28 made it easier for same-sex couples to become legal parents, and Oosterhoff had previously voiced objections to the bill saying he "definitely would not have supported it" and that it was "disrespectful to mothers and fathers". Brown said the delay was so that Oosterhoff could organize a celebration party for his family and supporters.

Oosterhoff is a social conservative, and believes that abortion and same-sex marriage should be illegal. However, in 2016 he stated that he is “absolutely not” a homophobe.

On March 7, 2017, Oosterhoff defeated PC vice-president and Niagara Regional Councillor Tony Quirk for the PC nomination for the next provincial election in the new constituency of Niagara West, which replaced Niagara West—Glanbrook as a result of federal redistribution.

Oosterhoff picked up 24,361 (52.74%) of the vote in the 2018 Ontario general election, defeating NDP candidate Curtis Fric. On June 29, 2018, Oosterhoff was appointed to the role of Parliamentary Assistant to Lisa Thompson, the Minister of Education. Oosterhoff was widely criticized on April 20, 2018, for his televised rendition of African-American spiritual 'Nobody Knows the Trouble I've Seen' given his socially conservative views and trouble-free middle class upbringing.

On October 31, 2018, Halloween, Oosterhoff celebrated the passing of the Cap and Trade Cancellation Act with a rendition of "Monster Mash" at Queen's Park.

In May 2019, Oosterhoff participated in an anti-abortion rally at Queen's Park hosted by March for Life, where he made a stage appearance. During his speech at the rally, he said that "We have survived 50 years of abortion in Canada and we pledge to fight to make abortion unthinkable in our lifetime."

In October 2020, amid the COVID-19 pandemic in Ontario, Oosterhoff took group photos with about forty people in a banquet hall, none of whom were wearing masks or social distancing, which was contrary to provincial public health measures. Oosterhoff deleted the photos and apologized, saying that he should have worn a mask and that except for the photograph, the group had otherwise distanced.

On June 6, 2024, Oosterhoff took office as the Associate Minister of Energy-Intensive Industries.

== Personal life ==
In 2019, Oosterhoff married Keri Nicole (née Ludwig). They have one son;

- Sullivan Oosterhoff (born January 21, 2021, in St. Catharines, Ontario)

== Electoral results ==
2025 Ontario general election
Party	Candidate	Votes	%	±%
Progressive Conservative	Sam Oosterhoff	22,916	51.13	+6.20
Liberal	Shauna Boyle	11,091	24.75	+5.58
New Democratic	Dave Augustyn	7,312	16.32	–4.39
Green	Mark Harrison	1,794	4.00	–2.46
New Blue	Aaron Albano	676	1.51	–1.12
Ontario Party	Aaron Allison	629	1.40	–3.88
Libertarian	Stefanos Karatopis	326	0.73	+0.11
Populist	Jim Torma	73	0.16	–0.03
Total valid votes/expense limit		44,817	99.38	–0.02
Total rejected, unmarked, and declined ballots		278	0.62	+0.02
Turnout		45,095	55.58	+2.42
Eligible voters		81,137		
Progressive Conservative hold		Swing		+0.31
Source: Elections Ontario

2022 Ontario general election: Niagara West
Party	Candidate	Votes	%	±%	Expenditures
Progressive Conservative	Sam Oosterhoff	18,779	44.93	–7.88	$76,009
New Democratic	Dave Augustyn	8,658	20.71	–9.09	$63,171
Liberal	Doug Joyner	8,013	19.17	+8.65	$16,498
Green	Laura Garner	2,702	6.46	+0.86	$37
Ontario Party	Dan Dale	2,207	5.28	–	$13,247
New Blue	Chris Arnew	1,098	2.63	–	$5,952
Libertarian	Stefanos Karatopis	259	0.62	–0.36	none listed
Populist	Jim Torma	80	0.19	–	none listed
Total valid votes/expense limit		41,796	99.40		
Total rejected, unmarked and declined ballots		251	0.60	–0.64	
Turnout		42,047	53.16	–10.11	
Eligible voters		79,089			
Progressive Conservative hold		Swing		+0.61	
Source: Elections Ontario

2018 Ontario general election: Niagara West
Party	Candidate	Votes	%	±%
Progressive Conservative	Sam Oosterhoff	24,361	52.74%	
New Democratic	Curtis Fric	13,744	29.75%	
Liberal	Joe Kanee	4,933	10.68%	
Green	Jessica Tillmanns	2,578	5.58%	
Libertarian	Stefanos Karatopis	451	0.98%	
Multicultural	Geoffrey E. Barton	127	0.27%	
Total valid votes		46,194	100.0	
Total rejected, unmarked and declined ballots		0	0%	
Turnout		46,194	64.10%	
Eligible voters		72,067		
Progressive Conservative pickup new district.				
Source: Elections Ontario

Ontario provincial by-election, November 17, 2016: Niagara West—Glanbrook Resignation of Tim Hudak
Party	Candidate	Votes	%	±%
Progressive Conservative	Sam Oosterhoff	17,652	53.95	+12.13
New Democratic	Michael Thomas	8,159	24.94	+2.71
Liberal	Vicky Ringuette	4,997	15.27	–13.07
Green	Donna Cridland	892	2.73	–2.65
Libertarian	Stefanos Karatopis	355	1.09	–0.65
None of the Above	Gregory Vezina	343	1.05	–
Independent	Martin Poos	200	0.61	–
Stop the New Sex-Ed Agenda	Queenie Yu	76	0.23	–
Canadian Constituents'	Arthur Smitherman	44	0.13	–
Total valid votes		32,718	99.45	
Total rejected, unmarked and declined ballots		182	0.55	–1.29
Turnout		32,900	32.23	–26.36
Eligible voters		102,076		
Progressive Conservative hold		Swing		+4.71
Source: Elections Ontario
