= Eves ministry =

Cabinet of Ontario, 2002–2003

- 23rd ministry of Ontario
- Date formed: May 15, 2002
- Date dissolved: October 23, 2003

People and organisations
- Monarch: Elizabeth II
- Lieutenant Governor: James Bartleman
- Premier: Ernie Eves
- Deputy Premier: Elizabeth Witmer
- Member party: Progressive Conservative
- Status in legislature: Majority (2002-2003)
- Opposition party: Liberal
- Opposition leader: Dalton McGuinty

History
- Incoming formation: 2002 PC Party leadership election
- Outgoing formation: 2003 Ontario general election
- Election: 1999
- Legislature term: 37th Parliament of Ontario
- Predecessor: Harris ministry
- Successor: McGuinty ministry

The Eves ministry was the combined cabinet (formally the Executive Council of Ontario) that governed Ontario from April 15, 2002, to October 22, 2003. It was led by the 23rd premier of Ontario, Ernie Eves. The cabinet was made up of members of the Progressive Conservative Party of Ontario, which commanded a parliamentary majority.

The ministry replaced the Harris ministry following the 2002 PC Party leadership election, occurring after the resignation of Premier Mike Harris. The ministry governed through the final seventeen months of the 37th Parliament of Ontario.

After the PC Party lost the 2003 election, the Eves ministry resigned, and was succeeded by the McGuinty ministry led by Premier Dalton McGuinty.

== History ==
=== The Eves Cabinet is formed ===
Eves assembled a cabinet of 25 ministers, which was sworn in on April 15, 2002. He included in his cabinet all four of the candidates who had competed with him for the leadership of the PC Party weeks previously: Jim Flaherty (as Minister of Enterprise, Opportunity and Innovation), Tony Clement (as Minister of Health and Long Term Care), Elizabeth Witmer (as Minister of Education and as Deputy Premier), and Chris Stockwell (as Minister of the Environment and Energy and House Leader).

Other high-profile portfolios went to David Young as Attorney General and Brad Clark as Minister of Labour. Future leadership contender Frank Klees (who would compete with Flaherty and Clement to succeed Eves as party leader in 2004) would eventually join the cabinet October 2, 2002 as Minister of tourism and recreation, though he had been unavailable to join Eves's ministry when it first launched.

Of the 25 original cabinet members, 22 had served the previous Harris ministry, including six who served for the entirety of its nearly seven-year duration (Dianne Cunningham, Chris Hodgson, Cam Jackson, Norm Sterling, David Tsubouchi, and Elizabeth Witmer). Sterling had also served nearly four years under Premier Davis (1981–1985), while Premier Eves and Bob Runciman had also a few months of experience under Premier Miller in 1985. Carl DeFaria, Tina Molinari, and Jerry Ouellette were the only cabinet members in the original Eves ministry without any experience.

The Eves ministry was originally organised into 27 portfolios (including the Premiership); Eves (premier and intergovernmental affairs) and David Tsubouchi (chair of Management Board of Cabinet and Minister of Culture) both served simultaneously in two ministerial positions at the outset of the ministry, and would do so for the duration.

There were six instances of ministerial portfolio reorganisation as Eves took over for Harris:

- Ministry of Economic Development and Trade was reorganized into the "Ministry of Enterprise, Opportunity and Innovation" (assigned to Jim Flaherty); also an "Associate Minister of Enterprise, Opportunity and Innovation" was created as a cabinet level position and assigned to David Turnbull.
- Ministry of Culture, Tourism and Recreation was divided into the "Ministry of Tourism and Recreation" (assigned to Cam Jackson), and the "Ministry of Culture" (assigned to David Tsubouchi, who also served as Chair of the Cabinet Board of Management).
- Ministry of Community, Family and Children's Services was reorganised out of the "Ministry of Community and Social Services" and the "Minister Responsible for Children." It was assigned to Brenda Elliott.
- Ministry of Public Safety and Security was created out of the merger of position of "Solicitor General" and "Ministry of Correctional Services" and assigned to Tim Hudak.
- Ministry of Municipal Affairs of Housing was assigned to Chris Hodgson; his position was augmented by two "associate ministers," including Tina Molinari assigned to focus on urban affairs, and Helen Johns, assigned to focus on rural affairs.
- "Associate Minister Responsible for Francophone Affairs" was created as a standalone cabinet-level position and assigned to Jon Baird.
- Ministry of Energy and the Environment was created from the merger of its two previously independent portfolios and assigned to Chris Stockwell.

=== Change to the Eves Ministry ===
There were a further two instances of ministerial portfolio reorganisation on August 22, 2002:

- Ministry of Energy and Ministry of the Environment were created, as the merger of the portfolios at the beginning of the ministry was reversed. "Ministry of Energy" was assigned to John Baird, and the "Ministry of the Environment" remained with Chris Stockwell.
- "Associate Minister Responsible for Francophone Affairs" was stripped of its standalone cabinet-level status. The incumbent of that position, John Baird, remained in a similar role as "Minister Responsible for Francophone Affairs."

There were also three instances of cabinet membership changes:

- Cam Jackson stepped down October 2, 2002, resigning in scandal. He was replaced as Minister of Tourism and Recreation by newly appointed cabinet minister Frank Klees.
- Chris Hodgson abruptly stepped down January 13, 2003. His position at Municipal Affairs and Housing ultimately went to David Young, who was replaced as attorney general by Norm Sterling. In a minor cabinet shuffle that involved three cabinet members, newly appointed Ernie Hardeman filled the vacancy in cabinet left by Hodgson's departure and was appointed "Associate Minister of Municipal Affairs and Housing for Rural Affairs."
- Chris Stockwell resigned from cabinet and from parliament July 17, 2003, to be replaced as Environment Minister by Jim Wilson, who was already in cabinet as Minister of Northern Development and Mines; Stockwell was replaced as House Leader by John Baird. Stockwell's spot in cabinet was assigned to Doug Galt who served as MWP, thus keeping the number of members of cabinet steady at 25, as it had been the whole time.

== Summary ==
After the PC Party lost the 2003 election, the Eves ministry resigned, and was succeeded by the McGuinty ministry led by Dalton McGuinty.

At any given time during the Eves ministry, there were 25 cabinet members, while there were 27 ministries. Thus the Eves ministry has the same number of cabinet members as Harris had at the end of his ministry (24), but three more portfolios than Harris had (24); Eves tended to appoint "associate ministers" (naming four while Harris named one) while Harris tended to appointed "ministers without portfolio" (naming six while Eves named only one, and even then only very late in the ministry); Eves had as many as three ministers covering multiple portfolios at a time, while Harris only temporarily resorted to such a measure in one instance.

Only six women served in this ministry, but two women served in high-profile portfolios: Janet Ecker served as minister of finance, and Elizabeth Witmer served as both deputy premier and minister of education. Also serving were Dianne Cunningham, Tina Molinari, Helen Johns, and Brenda Elliott.

With the exception of David Tsubouchi (of Japanese-Canadian heritage), the entire cabinet was white.

All 25 incumbent cabinet members would contest their seats in the 2003 Ontario general election. Eleven would win their contests, including Ernie Eves himself, Norm Sterling, Bob Runciman, Frank Klees, Jim Flaherty, Tim Hudak, and Elizabeth Witmer; Fifteen, however, went down to defeat, including Janet Ecker, Tony Clement, and Dianne Cunningham. The Progressive Conservative Party saw their caucus shrink from 59 to 24, as the Eves ministry went down to defeat.

== Trivia ==
Tony Clement's father John also served in the ministry of Bill Davis in the 1970s.

== List of ministers ==
Eves Ministry by Leadership Position
Position	Minister	Tenure	
Position	Minister	Start	End
Premier of Ontario	Ernie Eves	April 15, 2002	October 22, 2003
Deputy Premier of Ontario	Elizabeth Witmer	April 15, 2002	October 22, 2003
House Leader	Chris Stockwell	April 15, 2002	June 17, 2003
House Leader	John Baird	June 17, 2003	September 2, 2003
Deputy Government House Leader	John Baird	April 15, 2002	June 17, 2003
Deputy Government House Leader	vacant?	June 17, 2003	September 2, 2003
Chief Whip	John Baird	April 15, 2002	August 22, 2002
Chief Whip	Doug Galt	August 22, 2002	September 2, 2003

Eves Ministry by Portfolio (Alphabetical)
Portfolio	Minister	Tenure	
Portfolio	Minister	Start	End
Minister of Agriculture, and Food	Helen Johns	April 15, 2002	October 22, 2003
Attorney General	David Young	April 15, 2002	February 25, 2003
Attorney General	Norm Sterling	February 25, 2003	October 22, 2003
Minister of Community, Family and Children's Services	Brenda Elliott	April 15, 2002	October 22, 2003
Minister of Citizenship	Carl DeFaria	April 15, 2002	October 22, 2003
Minister of Consumer and Business Services	Tim Hudak	April 15, 2002	October 22, 2003
Minister of Culture	David Tsubouchi	April 15, 2002	October 22, 2003
Minister of Education	Elizabeth Witmer	April 15, 2002	October 22, 2003
Minister of Enterprise, Opportunity and Innovation	Jim Flaherty	April 15, 2002	October 22, 2003
Associate Minister of Enterprise, Opportunity and Innovation	David Turnbull	April 15, 2002	October 22, 2003
Minister of the Environment and Energy (Note: divided into "Ministry of Environment" and "Ministry of Energy" August 22, 2002)	Chris Stockwell	April 15, 2002	August 22, 2002
Minister of Energy (Note: created from "Ministry of the Environment and Energy" August 22, 2002)	John Baird	August 22, 2002	October 22, 2003
Minister of the Environment (Note: created from "Ministry of the Environment and Energy" August 22, 2002)	Chris Stockwell	August 22, 2002	June 17, 2003
Minister of the Environment	Jim Wilson	June 17, 2003	October 22, 2003
Minister of Finance	Janet Ecker	April 15, 2002	October 22, 2003
Minister of Health and Long-Term Care	Tony Clement	April 15, 2002	October 22, 2003
Associate Minister of Health and Long-Term Care	Dan Newman	April 15, 2002	October 22, 2003
Minister of Intergovernmental Affairs	Ernie Eves	April 15, 2002	October 22, 2003
Minister of Labour	Brad Clark	April 15, 2002	October 22, 2003
Minister of Municipal Affairs and Housing	Chris Hodgson	April 15, 2002	January 13, 2003
Minister of Municipal Affairs and Housing	Helen Johns (Interim)	January 13, 2003	February 25, 2003
Minister of Municipal Affairs and Housing	David Young	February 25, 2003	October 22, 2003
Associate Minister of Municipal Affairs and Housing; Responsible for Rural Affairs	Brian Coburn	April 15, 2002	February 25, 2003
Associate Minister of Municipal Affairs and Housing; Responsible for Rural Affairs	Ernie Hardeman	February 25, 2003	October 22, 2003
Associate Minister of Municipal Affairs and Housing; Responsible for Urban Affairs	Tina Molinari	April 15, 2002	October 22, 2003
Minister of Natural Resources	Jerry Ouellette	April 15, 2002	October 22, 2003
Minister of Northern Development and Mines	Jim Wilson	April 15, 2002	October 22, 2003
Minister of Public Safety and Security (Note: created April 15, 2002, combining "Solicitor General" with "Minister of Correctional Services.")	Bob Runciman	April 15, 2002	October 22, 2003
Minister Responsible for Native Affairs (Note: also "Attorney General.")	David Young	April 15, 2002	February 25, 2003
Minister Responsible for Native Affairs	Norm Sterling	February 25, 2003	October 22, 2003
Minister Responsible for Francophone Affairs (Note: named "Associate Minister Responsible for Francophone Affairs" from April 15, 2002 to August 22, 2002.)	John Baird	April 15, 2002	October 22, 2003
Minister Responsible for Seniors	Carl DeFaria	April 15, 2002	October 22, 2003
Minister Responsible for Women's Issues	Dianne Cunningham	April 15, 2002	October 22, 2003
Minister of Tourism and Recreation	Cam Jackson	April 15, 2002	October 2, 2002
Minister of Tourism and Recreation	Frank Klees	October 2, 2002	February 25, 2003
Minister of Tourism and Recreation	Brian Coburn	February 25, 2003	October 22, 2003
Minister of Transportation	Norm Sterling	April 15, 2002	February 25, 2003
Minister of Transportation	Frank Klees	February 25, 2003	October 22, 2003
Minister of Training, Colleges and Universities	Dianne Cunningham	April 15, 2002	October 22, 2003
Minister Without Portfolio	Doug Galt	August 22, 2002	October 22, 2003
Chair of the Management Board of Cabinet	David Tsubouchi	April 15, 2002	October 22, 2003
