= Harris ministry =

Cabinet of Ontario, 1995–2002

- 22nd ministry of Ontario

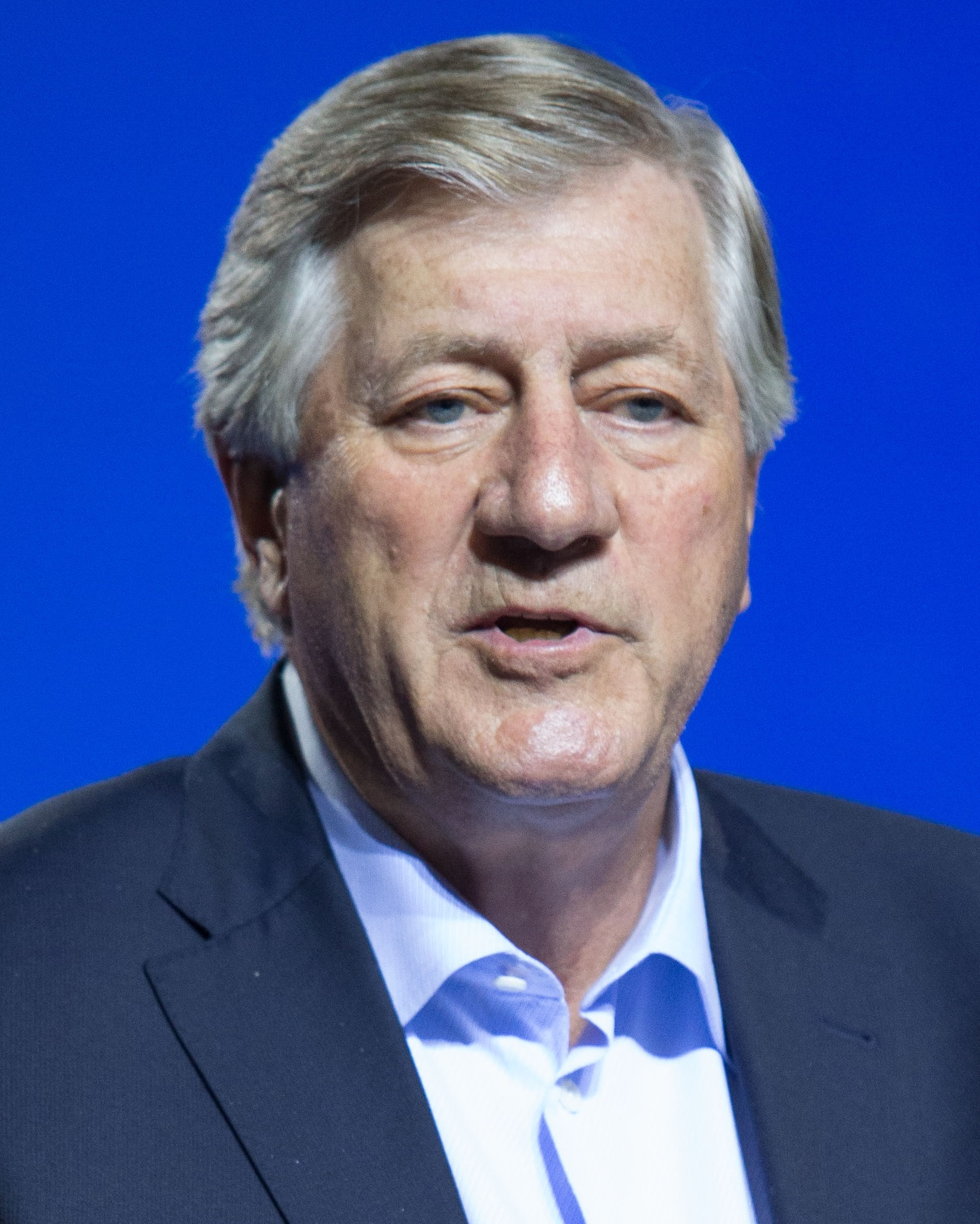
- Harris in 2014
- Date formed: June 26, 1995
- Date dissolved: April 14, 2002

People and organisations
- Monarch: Elizabeth II
- Lieutenant Governor: Hal Jackman; Hilary Weston; James Bartleman
- Premier: Mike Harris
- Deputy Premier: Ernie Eves (1995-2001); Jim Flaherty (2001-2002)
- Member party: Progressive Conservative
- Status in legislature: Majority (1995-2002)
- Opposition party: Liberal
- Opposition leader: Lyn McLeod (1995-1996); Dalton McGuinty (1996-2002)

History
- Incoming formation: 1995 Ontario general election
- Outgoing formation: 2002 PC Party leadership election
- Election: 1995, 1999
- Legislature term: 36th and 37th Parliament of Ontario
- Predecessor: Rae ministry
- Successor: Eves ministry

The Harris ministry was the combined cabinet (formally the Executive Council of Ontario) that governed Ontario from June 26, 1995, to April 14, 2002. It was led by the 22nd premier of Ontario, Mike Harris. The ministry was made up of members of the Progressive Conservative Party of Ontario (PC Party), which commanded a parliamentary majority.

The ministry replaced the Rae ministry following the 1995 Ontario general election. The ministry governed through the 36th Parliament of Ontario and the first several years of the 37th Parliament.

After Mike Harris resigned as Premier April 14, 2002, he was succeeded as Premier of Ontario by PC Party colleague Ernie Eves.

== History ==
=== The Harris Cabinet is formed ===
There were only nineteen cabinet members in the Harris ministry at first. Only five of them had any cabinet experience at all: Norm Sterling, who had accumulated the most experience, served for over four years (1981–1985) under Premier Bill Davis, who led the first of the two most recent previous PC Party ministries; Premier Harris himself, Ernie Eves, Bob Runciman, and Noble Villeneuve had each accumulated only a few months of experience in 1985 under Premier Frank Miller, who had led the second of the two most recent previous PC Party ministries. (Sterling had not served under Miller).

The highest profile portfolios were held by future Premier Ernie Eves (as Minister of Finance, Deputy Premier, and briefly House Leader), David Johnson (as Chair of Management Board of Cabinet and subsequent House Leader), Jim Wilson (as Minister of Health), and 2002 PC Party leadership candidate Elizabeth Witmer (as Minister of Labour), veteran Norm Sterling (as Minister of Consumer and Commercial Relations, and Bill Saunderson (as Minister of Economic Development, Trade and Tourism. These six formed the members of the vital Priorities and Planning Committee of Cabinet, the crucible of decision making in the Harris ministry. Harris's only rival in the 1990 PC Party leadership contest, Dianne Cunningham, was marginalised, being named Minister of Intergovernmental Affairs. John Snobelen served as Minister of Education and Charles Harnick as Attorney General.

Harris informed the members of his first cabinet that he and his political staff intended to be the agents of control in his Premiership, and that ministers should not consider themselves sovereign over their portfolios. Rather than appoint caucus members to cabinet positions commensurate to their areas of experience and expertise, Harris often appointed significantly less qualified ministers. Rather than appoint eminently qualified Al Leach, former commissioner of Toronto Transit Commission, to the position of Minister of Transport, he named Al Palladini, an owner of an automobile dealership; rather than appoint Diane Cunningham, former chair of London Board of Education, to the position of Minister of Education, he appointed John Snobelen, a high school drop-out. Ministers were often forced to publicly defend a bill they had little involvement in developing and didn't understand. Frequently the Premier's office would seize control of a controversy or an initiative and face serious negative political blowback.

There were two instances of ministerial portfolio reorganisation as Premier Harris took over from the Rae ministry:

- Three portfolios (Ministry of Culture, Tourism and Recreation, Ministry of Economic Development and Trade, and Ministry of Citizenship) were reorganised into two: the "Ministry of Culture, Citizenship and Recreation" (assigned to Marilyn Mushinski) and the "Ministry of Economic Development, Trade and Tourism" (assigned to Bill Saunderson).
- Ministry of Municipal Affairs and Ministry of Housing were reunited into Ministry of Municipal Affairs and Housing (and assigned to Al Leach).
- Ministry of Northern Development and Ministry of Natural Resources were combined into "Ministry Natural Resources, Northern Development and Mines" (and assigned to Chris Hodgson).

Thus the nineteen cabinet members served in one of eighteen discrete portfolios (including the Premiership; there was also a minister without portfolio, Cam Jackson). Premier Harris did not serve in any other portfolio, nor would he for the duration of his ministry.

The number of ministers climbed to 20 with a minor shuffle August 16, 1996, which involved, among other changes, Janet Ecker joining cabinet as Minister of Community and Social Services (and the addition to cabinet of a second minister without portfolio, Rob Sampson). David Johnson also took over the duties of House Leader from Eves. Underachievers David Tsubouchi (shuffled to Ministry of Consumer and Commercial Relations) and Brenda Elliott (dropped from the ministry entirely) were casualties of the shuffle.

=== 1997 Shuffle ===
The first of three major cabinet shuffles occurred October 10, 1997, a few months after the midterm point of the 36th Parliament.

Five new members joined cabinet, including 2002 PC Party leadership candidates Tony Clement (as Minister of Transportation) and Jim Flaherty (as Minister of Labour). Two established cabinet members were dismissed from minor portfolios.

Seven established cabinet members in total were involved in the shuffle, most notably Elizabeth Witmer, who took over as Minister of Health, and David Johnson, who took over as Minister of Education. Norm Sterling took over for Johnson as House Leader. Eleven established cabinet members were unaffected by the shuffle, including Premier Harris himself, and Ernie Eves remained as Minister of Finance.

There were two instances of ministerial portfolio reorganisation:

- Ministry of Energy and Environment was divided into the "Ministry of Energy, Science and Technology" (assigned to Jim Wilson) and the "Ministry of the Environment" (assigned to the incumbent of the previous combined portfolio, Norm Sterling).
- Ministry of Natural Resources, Northern Development and Mines was divided into the "Ministry of Natural Resources" (assigned to John Snobelen) and the "Ministry of Northern Development and Mines" (assigned to the incumbent of the previous combined portfolio, Chris Hodgson).

Hodgson also took on the cabinet level position of Chair of Management Board of Cabinet; this was the only instance of a member of the Harris cabinet holding two portfolios for the duration of the ministry. Thus, the cabinet swelled to 23 members (including now four ministers without portfolios, with the additions of Margaret Marland and David Turnbull), serving in twenty ministries (including the Premiership).

=== 1999 Shuffle ===
The second major shuffle occurred June 17, 1999, soon after the 1999 provincial election. The PC Party performed very well in this contest, achieving results similar to the 1995 provincial election, (they won about 45% of the popular vote in each contest) but returned with a much smaller caucus (shrinking from 82 PC Party MPPs to 59) in an extensively redistributed district map and a much smaller provincial parliament at Queen's Park. Isabel Bassett, Noble Villeneuve and David Johnson all went down to defeat at the polls, while Al Leach and Charles Harnick decided not to run. Thus, though no one was dismissed from the ministry, five vacancies opened up in the Harris ministry.

These vacancies were filled by the addition of seven new cabinet members, including 2002 PC Party leadership contender and incumbent Speaker Chris Stockwell, 2004 and 2009 PC Party leadership contender Frank Klees, and 2009 PC Party leadership victor Tim Hudak; Stockwell, notorious as Harris's biggest critic within the party caucus, was named Minister of Labour in the highest profile appointment among the seven rookies.

Thirteen established cabinet members swapped portfolios, including Jim Flaherty, who took over as Attorney General, and Janet Ecker, who took over as Minister of Education. Only five cabinet ministers were unaffected by the shuffle, including Premier Harris himself, John Snobelen, Jim Wilson, Margaret Marland, and, once again, Ernie Eves.

There were four instances of ministerial portfolio reorganisation:

- Ministry of Economic Development, Trade and Tourism was divided into the "Ministry of Tourism" (assigned to Cam Jackson), and the "Ministry of Economic Development and Trade" (assigned to the incumbent of the previous combined portfolio, Al Palladini).
- Ministry of Education and Training (as it was actually called) was divided into the "Ministry of Training, Colleges and Universities" (assigned to Dianne Cunningham), and the "Ministry of Education" (assigned as previously mentioned to Janet Ecker).
- Solicitor General and Correctional Services was divided into the position of "Solicitor General," (assigned to David Tsubouchi), and the "Ministry of Correctional Services," (assigned to Rob Sampson).
- Ministry of Health and Long-Term Care was created by combining the Ministry of Health with the Ministry of Long-Term Care (which was actually a fairly new ministry itself, having only been created between shuffles July 27, 1998, and had been assigned to established cabinet minister Cam Jackson). The new ministry remained with Elizabeth Witmer, while Jackson moved on to Tourism, as mentioned previously.

Thus the number of cabinet ministers swelled in number to 25 (the number of ministers without portfolios dropping to two, Margaret Marland and Frank Klees), while the number of ministries (including the Premiership) grew to 23. No cabinet members helmed more than one portfolio.

=== 2001 Shuffle ===
The third and final shuffle occurred February 8, 2001, a few months before the midterm point of the 37th Parliament, triggered by the resignation of first Al Palladini as Minister of Economic Development and Trade, then of Ernie Eves as Minister of Finance and Deputy Premier. Eves was the only cabinet member besides Harris himself to still be in his original role in the ministry, having not yet been involved in a shuffle.

All told, four cabinet members left cabinet, while four new members joined, most notably David Young as Attorney General.

Twelve established cabinet members were involved in this shuffle, most notably Jim Flaherty (who took over the positions vacated by Eves as Minister of Finance and Deputy Premier), Bob Runciman (who took over for Palladini as Minister of Economic Development and Trade), and Tony Clement, (who moved into the position of Minister of Health and Long-Term Care). Janet Ecker took over duties as House Leader from Norm Sterling, who remained in the cabinet in a minor portfolio. Once again, John Snobelen and Jim Wilson were among the nine established cabinet members who remained at their incumbent portfolios.

There were four instances of ministerial portfolio reorganisation:

- Ministry of Citizenship, Culture and Recreation and Ministry of Tourism were reorganized into the "Ministry of Citizenship" (assigned to Cam Jackson), and the "Ministry of Culture, Tourism and Recreation" (assigned to Tim Hudak).
- Ministry of Consumer and Commercial Relations was renamed "Ministry of Consumer and Business Services" and assigned to Norm Sterling.
- Associate Minister of Health and Long-Time Care was created as a position and assigned to Helen Johns. It would be the only "associate ministry" of the Harris ministry.
- also two new ministerial areas of responsibility were created: Minister Responsible for Seniors and Minister Responsible for Children, both assigned to established cabinet ministers.

Thus the number of ministries (including the Premiership) swelled to 24, while the number of members of cabinet was steady at 25 (with only one remaining minister without portfolio, Frank Klees; he would be the final member to leave the Harris cabinet, July 31, 2001, to be replaced by the final new member, Gary Stewart, who filled the same role as Klees).

== Summary ==
Mike Harris resigned as Premier April 14, 2002. He was succeeded by Ernie Eves, who had prevailed in the Pc Party leadership election over Harris ministry colleagues Elizabeth Witmer, Tony Clement, Jim Flaherty, and Chris Stockwell.

37 people served in the Harris ministry, including eight cabinet members who served the entirety of the ministry's nearly seven-year duration: Premier Harris himself, Dianne Cunningham, Chris Hodgson, Cam Jackson, John Snobelen, Norm Sterling, David Tsubouchi, and Elizabeth Witmer. All except Harris and Snobelen would go on to serve in the Eves ministry that succeeded the Harris ministry; in total, 24 former Harris ministers would serve under Eves.

Three cabinet members faced suspensions from their portfolios at one time or another: Jim Wilson at Ministry of Health (suspended December 9, 1996 - February 21, 1997 due to a scandal involving the disclosure by an aide of confidential information on the income of a medical specialist), Bob Runciman at Solicitor General and Correction Services (suspended April 27 - July 27, 1998), and Rob Sampson at Ministry of Correctional Services (suspended December 5, 2000 - March 8, 2001) But for their suspensions, Runciman and Wilson also would have served in the Harris ministry for the entire duration. Runciman and Wilson would go on to serve under Eves, but Sampson would not.

Eight women served in the Harris ministry: Isabel Bassett, Dianne Cunningham, Janet Ecker, Brenda Elliott, Helen Johns, Margaret Marland, Marilyn Mushinski, and Elizabeth Witmer (although there were never more than five women in cabinet at a time). With the exception of David Tsubouchi (of Japanese-Canadian heritage), every cabinet member was White.

Other than Harris, three cabinet members served continuously in one portfolio for over four years: Ernie Eves served as Minister of Finance from June 26, 1995, to February 8, 2001; Jim Wilson and John Snobelen served as Minister of Energy, Science and Technology and Minister of Natural Resources respectively from October 10, 1997, to April 14, 2002.

Over the course of the Harris ministry the number of portfolios increased from 18 to 24.

== List of ministers ==
Harris Ministry by Portfolio (Alphabetical)
Portfolio	Minister	Tenure	
Portfolio	Minister	Start	End
Premier and President of the Council	Mike Harris	June 26, 1995	April 14, 2002
Deputy Premier	Ernie Eves	June 26, 1995	February 8, 2001
Deputy Premier	Jim Flaherty	February 8, 2001	April 14, 2002
Minister of Agriculture, Food, and Rural Affairs	Noble Villeneuve	June 26, 1995	June 17, 1999
Minister of Agriculture, Food, and Rural Affairs	Ernie Hardeman	June 17, 1999	February 8, 2001
Minister of Agriculture, Food, and Rural Affairs	Brian Coburn	February 8, 2001	April 14, 2002
Attorney General	Charles Harnick	June 26, 1995	June 17, 1999
Attorney General	Jim Flaherty	June 17, 1999	February 8, 2001
Attorney General	David Young	February 8, 2001	April 14, 2002
Minister of Community and Social Services	David Tsubouchi	June 26, 1995	August 16, 1996
Minister of Community and Social Services	Janet Ecker	August 16, 1996	June 17, 1999
Minister of Community and Social Services	John Baird	June 17, 1999	April 14, 2002
Minister of Citizenship, Culture and Recreation (Note: reorganized into "Ministry of Citizenship" and "Ministry of Culture, Tourism and Recreation" February 8, 2001)	Marilyn Mushinski	June 26, 1995	October 10, 1997
Minister of Citizenship, Culture and Recreation	Isabel Bassett	October 10, 1997	June 17, 1999
Minister of Citizenship, Culture and Recreation	Helen Johns	June 17, 1999	February 8, 2001
Minister of Citizenship (Note: created from "Ministry of Citizenship, Culture and Recreation" February 8, 2001.)	Cam Jackson	February 8, 2001	April 14, 2002
Minister of Consumer and Business Services (Note: named "Ministry of Consumer and Commercial Relations" from June 26, 1995 to February 8, 2001.)	Norm Sterling	June 26, 1995	August 16, 1996
Minister of Consumer and Business Services	David Tsubouchi	August 16, 1996	June 17, 1999
Minister of Consumer and Business Services	Bob Runciman	June 17, 1999	February 8, 2001
Minister of Consumer and Business Services	Norm Sterling	February 8, 2001	April 14, 2002
Minister of Correctional Services (Note: created from "Solicitor General and Minister of Correctional Services" June 17, 1999.)	Rob Sampson	June 17, 1999	Dec 5, 2000
Minister of Correctional Services	Norm Sterling (interim)	Dec 5, 2000	March 8, 2001
Minister of Correctional Services	Rob Sampson	March 8, 2001	April 14, 2002
Minister of Culture, Tourism and Recreation (Note: created from "Ministry of Tourism" and "Ministry of Citizenship, Culture, and Recreation February 8, 2001.)	Tim Hudak	February 8, 2001	April 14, 2002
Minister of Education (Note: named "Minister of Education and Training" from June 26, 1995 to June 17, 1999.)	John Snobelen	June 26, 1995	October 10, 1997
Minister of Education	David Johnson	October 10, 1997	June 17, 1999
Minister of Education	Janet Ecker	June 17, 1999	April 14, 2002
Minister of Economic Development (Note: named "Ministry of Economic Development, Trade and Tourism" from June 26, 1995 to June 17, 1999.) (Note: named "Ministry of Economic Development and Trade" from June 17, 1999 to April 14, 2002.)	Bill Saunderson	June 26, 1995	October 10, 1997
Minister of Economic Development	Al Palladini	October 10, 1997	February 8, 2001
Minister of Economic Development	Bob Runciman	February 8, 2001	April 14, 2002
Minister of the Environment and Energy (Note: divided into "Ministry of Environment" and "Ministry of Energy, Science and Technology" October 10, 1997.)	Brenda Elliott	June 26, 1995	August 16, 1996
Minister of the Environment and Energy	Norm Sterling	August 16, 1996	October 10, 1997
Minister of Energy Science and Technology (Note: created from "Ministry of the Environment and Energy" October 10, 1997.)	Jim Wilson	October 10, 1997	April 14, 2002
Minister of the Environment (Note: created from "Ministry of the Environment and Energy" October 10, 1997.)	Norm Sterling	October 10, 1997	June 17, 1999
Minister of the Environment	Tony Clement	June 17, 1999	March 3, 2000
Minister of the Environment	Dan Newman	March 3, 2000	February 8, 2001
Minister of the Environment	Elizabeth Witmer	February 8, 2001	April 14, 2002
Minister of Finance	Ernie Eves	June 26, 1995	February 8, 2001
Minister of Finance	Jim Flaherty	February 8, 2001	April 14, 2002
Minister of Health	Jim Wilson	June 26, 1995	Dec 9, 1996
Minister of Health	David Johnson interim	Dec 9, 1996	February 21, 1997
Minister of Health	Jim Wilson	February 21, 1997	October 10, 1997
Minister of Health	Elizabeth Witmer	October 10, 1997	June 17, 1999
Minister of Health	merged with Long-Term Care	June 17, 1999	April 14, 2002
Minister of Health and Long-Term Care (Note: created from "Ministry of Health" and "Ministry of Long-Term Care" June 17, 1999.)	Elizabeth Witmer	June 17, 1999	February 8, 2001
Minister of Health and Long-Term Care	Tony Clement	February 8, 2001	April 14, 2002
Associate Minister of Health and Long-Term Care (Note: created February 8, 2001.)	Helen Johns	February 8, 2001	April 14, 2002
Minister of Intergovernmental Affairs	Dianne Cunningham	June 26, 1995	June 17, 1999
Minister of Intergovernmental Affairs	Norm Sterling	June 17, 1999	February 8, 2001
Minister of Intergovernmental Affairs	Brenda Elliott	February 8, 2001	April 14, 2002
Minister of Labour	Elizabeth Witmer	June 26, 1995	October 10, 1997
Minister of Labour	Jim Flaherty	October 10, 1997	June 17, 1999
Minister of Labour	Chris Stockwell	June 17, 1999	April 14, 2002
Minister of Long-Term Care (Note: created July 27, 1998.)	Cam Jackson	July 27, 1998	June 17, 1999
Minister of Long-Term Care	merged with Health	June 17, 1999	April 14, 2002
Minister of Municipal Affairs and Housing	Al Leach	June 26, 1995	June 17, 1999
Minister of Municipal Affairs and Housing	Steve Gilchrist	June 17, 1999	October 25, 1999
Minister of Municipal Affairs and Housing	Tony Clement	October 25, 1999	February 8, 2001
Minister of Municipal Affairs and Housing	Chris Hodgson	February 8, 2001	April 14, 2002
Minister of Natural Resources, Northern Development and Mines (Note: divided into "Ministry of Natural Resources" and "Ministry of Northern Development and Mines" October 10, 1997.)	Chris Hodgson	June 26, 1995	October 10, 1997
Minister of Natural Resources (Note: created from "Ministry of Natural Resources and Northern Development and Mines" October 10, 1997.)	John Snobelen	October 10, 1997	April 14, 2002
Minister of Northern Development and Mines	Chris Hodgson	October 10, 1997	June 2, 1999
Minister of Northern Development and Mines	Tim Hudak	June 2, 1999	February 8, 2001
Minister of Northern Development and Mines	Dan Newman	February 8, 2001	April 14, 2002
Minister Responsible for Native Affairs (Note: also "Attorney General.")	Charles Harnick	June 26, 1995	June 17, 1999
Minister Responsible for Native Affairs	Jim Flaherty	June 17, 1999	February 8, 2001
Minister Responsible for Native Affairs	David Young	February 8, 2001	April 14, 2002
Minister Responsible for Children			
Minister Responsible for Children	John Baird	February 8, 2001	April 14, 2002
Minister Responsible for Francophone Affairs	Noble Villeneuve	June 26, 1995	June 17, 1999
Minister Responsible for Francophone Affairs	John Baird	June 17, 1999	April 14, 2002
Minister Responsible for Seniors	Cam Jackson	February 8, 2001	April 14, 2002
Minister Responsible for Women's Issues	Dianne Cunningham	June 26, 1995	June 17, 1999
Minister Responsible for Women's Issues	Helen Johns	June 17, 1999	February 8, 2001
Minister Responsible for Women's Issues	Dianne Cunningham	February 8, 2001	April 14, 2002
Minister of Tourism (Note: created from "Ministry of Economic Development, Trade, and Tourism." June 17, 1999.)
Minister of Tourism	Cam Jackson	June 17, 1999	February 8, 2001
Minister of Tourism	merged into Culture, Tourism and Recreation	February 8, 2001	April 14, 2002
Minister of Transportation	Al Palladini	June 26, 1995	October 10, 1997
Minister of Transportation	Tony Clement	October 10, 1997	June 17, 1999
Minister of Transportation	David Turnbull	June 17, 1999	February 8, 2001
Minister of Transportation	Brad Clark	February 8, 2001	April 14, 2002
Minister of Training, Colleges and Universities (Note: created from "Ministry of Education and Training" June 17, 1999.)	Dianne Cunningham	June 17, 1999	April 14, 2002
Ministers Without Portfolio	Cam Jackson (Worker's Compensation)	June 26, 1995	July 27, 1998
Ministers Without Portfolio	Rob Sampson (Privatisation)	August 16, 1996	June 17, 1999
Ministers Without Portfolio	Margaret Marland	October 10, 1997	February 8, 2001
Ministers Without Portfolio	David Turnbull	October 10, 1997	June 17, 1999
Ministers Without Portfolio	Frank Klees	June 17, 1999	June 30, 2001
Ministers Without Portfolio	Gary Stewart	July 31, 2001	April 14, 2002
Solicitor General and Minister of Correctional Services (Note: divided into "Solicitor General" and "Minister of Correctional Services" June 17, 1999.)	Bob Runciman	June 26, 1995	April 27, 1998
Solicitor General and Minister of Correctional Services	Jim Flaherty (interim)	April 27, 1998	July 27, 1998
Solicitor General and Minister of Correctional Services	Bob Runciman	July 27, 1998	June 17, 1999
Solicitor General (Note: created from "Solicitor General and Ministry of Correctional Services" June 17, 1999.)	David Tsubouchi	June 17, 1999	February 8, 2001
Solicitor General	David Turnbull	February 8, 2001	April 14, 2002
Chair of the Management Board of Cabinet	David Johnson	June 26, 1995	October 10, 1997
Chair of the Management Board of Cabinet	Chris Hodgson	October 10, 1997	February 8, 2001
Chair of the Management Board of Cabinet	David Tsubouchi	February 8, 2001	April 14, 2002
House Leader	Ernie Eves	June 26, 1995	August 16, 1996
House Leader	David Johnson	August 16, 1996	October 10, 1997
House Leader	Norm Sterling (36th Parliament)	October 10, 1997	May 5, 1999
House Leader	abbr=on|Norm Sterling (37th Parliament)	June 17, 1999	February 8, 2001
House Leader	Janet Ecker	February 8, 2001	April 14, 2002
Deputy House Leader	Chris Hodgson	October 10, 1997	May 5, 1999
Chief Whip	David Turnbull (as backbencher)	June 26, 1995	October 10, 1997
Chief Whip	David Turnbull (as cabinet member)	October 10, 1997	May 5, 1999
Chief Whip	Frank Klees (as cabinet member)	June 17, 1999	June 30, 2001
Chief Whip	Frank Klees (as backbencher)	June 30, 2001	July 30, 2001
Chief Whip	Gary Stewart	July 30, 2001	April 14, 2002
