= Brad Clark =

Canadian politician

The Honourable Brad Clark ECO

Hamilton City Councillor
- Incumbent
- Assumed office 2018
- Preceded by: Doug Conley
- Constituency: Ward Nine (Upper Stoney Creek)

Hamilton City Councillor
- In office 2006–2014
- Preceded by: Phil Bruckler
- Succeeded by: Doug Conley
- Constituency: Ward Nine (Heritage Stoney Creek)

Member of Provincial Parliament of the Legislative Assembly of Ontario
- In office 1999–2003
- Preceded by: New riding
- Succeeded by: Jennifer Mossop
- Constituency: Stoney Creek

Personal details
- Born: 1960 (age 65–66) Hamilton, Ontario, Canada
- Party: Progressive Conservative
- Occupation: Radio broadcaster, musician

Brad Clark (born 1960) is a Canadian politician in Ontario, Canada. Clark served as the Ward 9 Hamilton City Councillor from December 2006 to December 2014 and again from December 2018 to November 2026. Prior to this, he was a Progressive Conservative member of the Legislative Assembly of Ontario from 1999 to 2003, and was a cabinet minister in the governments of Mike Harris and Ernie Eves.

== Background ==
Clark was educated at Mohawk College in Hamilton, receiving a diploma in radio broadcasting. He owned and operated a small business after his graduation, and also served as executive director of the Songwriters Association of Canada. In June 2004, Clark began co-hosting a weekly program on aging on CHML radio.

== Politics ==
In the provincial election of 1999, he ran as the Progressive Conservative candidate in the suburban Hamilton riding of Stoney Creek. He defeated Liberal candidate Chris Phillips by about 2,500 votes. On February 8, 2001, he was appointed as the province's Minister of Transportation. When Ernie Eves succeeded Mike Harris as Premier on April 15, 2002, he named Clark as his Minister of Labour.

Clark was initially favoured for re-election in the provincial election of 2003 against Liberal candidate Tony Magnini. Magnini was forced to resign in mid-campaign amid allegations of fraud, however, and the Liberals were able to convince Jennifer Mossop, a popular local journalist, to take his place. She defeated Clark by over 5,000 votes. In 2004, he endorsed Frank Klees's bid to lead the Ontario Progressive Conservatives.

On November 13, 2006, Clark beat out incumbent city councillor Phil Bruckler by a narrow margin for a seat on the Hamilton City Council to represent Ward 9, which includes the mountain and heritage areas of Stoney Creek. In the federal election of 2011 Clark ran against and was defeated by NDP incumbent Wayne Marston in the riding of Hamilton East—Stoney Creek. He did not step down from council when running for this political position.

In the Hamilton Municipal Election of 2014, Clark ran for the mayoralty of the city. He placed second, being defeated by former Hamilton Mayor Fred Eisenberger. This ended his term as a city councillor when the new council was sworn in late in December 2014.

Clark was returned to the office of Ward 9 city councillor in 2018 and re-elected in 2022. He lost his seat in the 2026 election.

=== Cabinet positions ===
Eves ministry, Province of Ontario (2002–2003)
Cabinet post (1)
Predecessor	Office	Successor
Chris Stockwell	Minister of Labour; 2002–2003	Chris Bentley
Harris ministry, Province of Ontario (1995–2002)
Cabinet post (1)
Predecessor	Office	Successor
David Turnbull	Minister of Transportation; 2001–2002	Norm Sterling
