= Cam Jackson =

Canadian politician (born 1951)

The Honourable Cam Jackson ECO
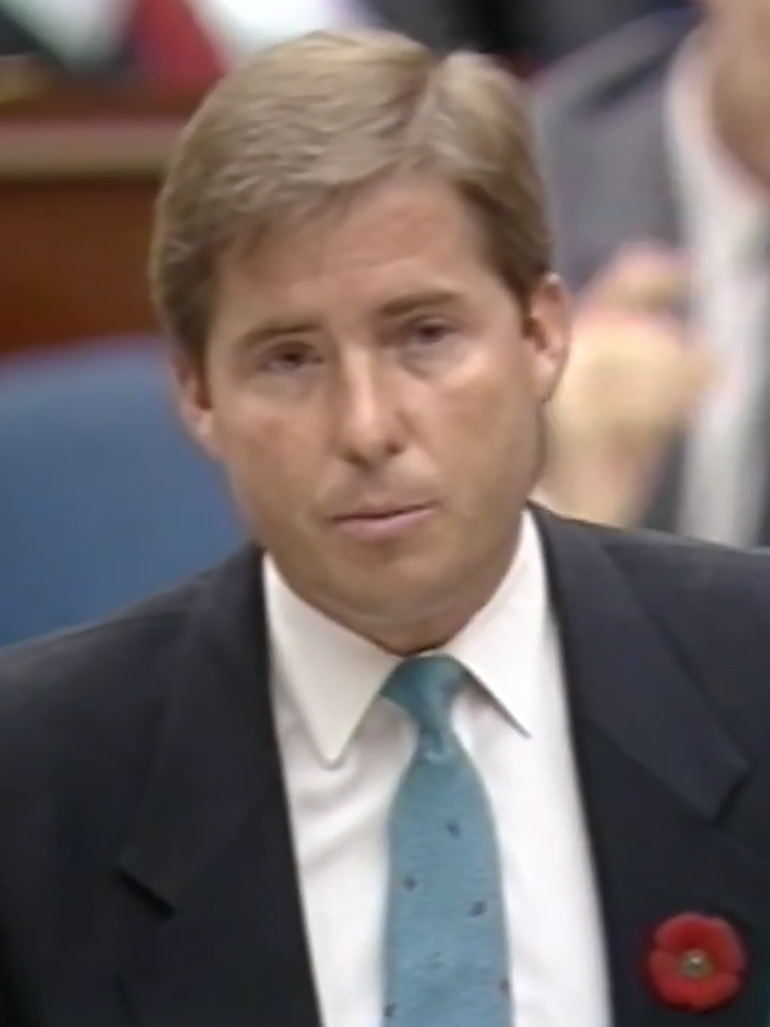
- Jackson in 1987

27th Mayor of Burlington, Ontario
- In office 2006–2010
- Preceded by: Rob MacIsaac
- Succeeded by: Rick Goldring

Ontario MPP
- In office 1999–2006
- Preceded by: first member
- Succeeded by: Joyce Savoline
- Constituency: Burlington
- In office 1985–1999
- Preceded by: George Albert Kerr
- Succeeded by: riding dissolved
- Constituency: Burlington South

Personal details
- Born: February 27, 1951 (age 75) Hamilton, Ontario, Canada
- Party: Progressive Conservative

Cameron "Cam" Jackson (born February 27, 1951) is a Canadian politician. A Progressive Conservative, he was first elected to the Legislative Assembly of Ontario in 1985, and held the office of Member of Provincial Parliament (MPP) for Burlington until his resignation on September 28, 2006 to run for mayor of Burlington in the 2006 election. He served as mayor from 2006 to 2010 when he was defeated by Rick Goldring.

== Background ==
Jackson was born in Hamilton, Ontario. His mother was Ukrainian Canadian. He was educated at McMaster University, although he left before graduating to take a job with the Ontario Conservative Party. Before entering politics, he was the chief executive officer of the Metropolitan Hamilton Real Estate Board, and also worked for the Halton Housing Authority from 1975 to 1980. In 1996, he was named "Officer Brother of the Order of St. John of Jerusalem" by Canada's governor-general. He also served as a trustee on the Halton Public School Board for ten years.

== Provincial politics ==
Jackson was elected for the riding of Burlington South in the provincial election of 1985, defeating Liberal candidate Doug Redfearn by about 4,500 votes. He was a backbench supporter of the government of Frank Miller, which was defeated in the legislature shortly after the election. In late 1985, Jackson supported Alan Pope's unsuccessful bid to replace Miller as party leader.

Jackson was nearly defeated in the provincial election of 1987, defeating Liberal Bill Priestner by 605 votes. He won by a much greater margin in the 1990 election. The Tories finished in third place in both instances, behind the Liberals and the New Democratic Party.

The Progressive Conservatives returned to power in the 1995 provincial election, and Jackson was re-elected in Burlington South with over 70% of the popular vote. He was made a Minister without Portfolio in the government of Mike Harris on June 26, 1995, with responsibility for the Workers Compensation Board. After a shuffle on August 16, 1996, he was given ministerial responsibility for Seniors. He was finally given a full portfolio on July 27, 1998, being made Ontario Minister of Long-Term Care and Seniors. Jackson was easily re-elected in the 1999 provincial election for the redistributed riding of Burlington.

On June 17, 1999, he was named Minister of Tourism. He was named Minister of Citizenship with responsibility for Seniors on February 8, 2001, but returned to the Tourism portfolio (now retitled Tourism and Recreation) when Ernie Eves succeeded Mike Harris as Premier on April 15, 2002. He was forced to resign on October 2, 2002 due to a controversy over his practice of billing the government for steak dinners and hotel stays. Jackson did not appear in public for weeks and there was speculation that he would not run for re-election. Jackson was fully exonerated of all allegations before the next election, and did retain his riding in the 2003 election (albeit with a greatly reduced majority) while dozens of other Tory MPPs lost their seats.

There had been speculation that Jackson would run to succeed Eves in the 2004 Ontario Progressive Conservative leadership election but in July, Jackson endorsed John Tory's candidacy for the position of party leader.

=== Cabinet positions ===
Eves ministry, Province of Ontario (2002–2003)
Cabinet post (1)
Predecessor	Office	Successor
Tim Hudak (Note: Combined with Culture before 2002.)	Minister of Tourism and Recreation; 2002 (April–October)	Frank Klees
Harris ministry, Province of Ontario (1995–2002)
Cabinet posts (5)
Predecessor	Office	Successor
Helen Johns	Minister of Citizenship; 2001–2002; With Responsibility for Seniors	Carl DeFaria
Al Palladini (Note: Combined with Economic Development and Trade before 1999.)	Minister of Tourism; 1999–2001	Tim Hudak (Note: Combined with Culture and Recreation in 2001.)
New position	Minister of Long-Term Care; 1998–1999	Elizabeth Witmer (Note: Combined with Minister of Health in 1999.)
Sub-Cabinet Post
Predecessor	Title	Successor
	Minister Without Portfolio (1995–1998); Responsible for Workers' Compensation Board (95–96); Seniors (96–98)	

== Mayor of Burlington ==
On September 28, 2006, Jackson announced both his retirement from provincial politics and his candidacy for Mayor of Burlington. He was elected in the 2006 municipal election, succeeding Rob MacIsaac. After just one term in office, he was defeated in the 2010 municipal election by Rick Goldring.

=== Electoral record ===
Candidate	Vote	%
Cam Jackson	14,941	34.9
Joan Lougheed	13,687	32.0
Rick Burgess	12,658	29.6
Philip Papadoupoulos	1,393	3.3
Stephen Kolcun	147	0.3
