= Norm Sterling =

Canadian politician (born 1942)

The Honourable Norm Sterling ECO

Ontario MPP
- In office 2007–2011
- Preceded by: Riding established
- Succeeded by: Jack MacLaren
- Constituency: Carleton—Mississippi Mills
- In office 1999–2007
- Preceded by: Riding established
- Succeeded by: Riding abolished
- Constituency: Lanark—Carleton
- In office 1987–1999
- Preceded by: Robert Mitchell
- Succeeded by: Riding abolished
- Constituency: Carleton
- In office 1977–1987
- Preceded by: Donald Roy Irvine
- Succeeded by: Riding abolished
- Constituency: Carleton—Grenville

Personal details
- Born: Norman William Sterling; February 19, 1942 (age 84) Ottawa, Ontario, Canada
- Party: Progressive Conservative
- Occupation: Lawyer

Norman William "Norm" Sterling ECO (born February 19, 1942) is a Canadian politician, who served in the Legislative Assembly of Ontario from 1977 to 2011.

== Background ==
Sterling attended Carleton University and the University of Ottawa, and worked as a lawyer and engineer before entering public life. He was a partner in the Sterling & Young law firm, and in 1974 became president of the Manotick Home & School Association.

== Politics ==
=== Davis government ===
Sterling ran unsuccessfully for a Progressive Conservative nomination in 1971, at age 29. He tried again, successfully, in 1977, and was elected to the Ontario legislature in the 1977 provincial election in the safe eastern Ontario riding of Grenville—Carleton. He became parliamentary assistant to the Attorney General in 1978, but was not appointed to the cabinet of Bill Davis in his first term as a Member of Provincial Parliament (MPP).

Sterling was returned without difficulty in the 1981 election, and served as a minister without portfolio from April 10, 1981 to February 13, 1982. He was appointed as Provincial Secretary for Justice on February 13, 1982. On July 6, 1983, he was named as Provincial Secretary for Resource Development. Sterling, who represents a predominantly rural and Protestant region of Ontario, disagreed with the Davis government's decision to fully fund Ontario's Catholic school system and insisted that his protest be entered into the official minutes of the executive council. Sterling initially supported Dennis Timbrell to replace Davis as party leader, but crossed to Frank Miller on the last ballot after Timbrell was eliminated.

Davis ministry, Province of Ontario (1971–1985)
Cabinet posts (3)
| Predecessor | Office | Successor |
|---|---|---|
| Lorne Henderson | Provincial Secretary for Resource Development; 1983–1985 | Ernie Eves |
| Gordon Walker | Provincial Secretary for Justice; 1982–1983 | Reuben Baetz |
Sub-Cabinet Post
| Predecessor | Title | Successor |
| | Minister Without Portfolio (1981–1982) | |

=== In opposition ===
The Progressive Conservatives lost power following the 1985 election, although Sterling had no difficulty being re-elected in his own riding. There was another Progressive Conservative leadership convention in late 1985. On this occasion, Sterling broke with Timbrell (describing the latter's post-election opposition to Catholic school funding as an opportunistic volte-face), and supported Larry Grossman.

In the Liberal landslide of 1987, however, he was only able to defeat Liberal candidate Roly Armitage by about 500 votes in the redistributed riding of Carleton.

Sterling was re-elected in the provincial elections of 1990. During his first stint in opposition, Sterling held numerous shadow cabinet portfolios such as critic for: the Solicitor General of Ontario; the Management Board of Cabinet; Economics, Industry, Trade and Technology; Intergovernmental Affairs; and Treasury and Economics and Revenue.

=== Harris government ===
In the 1995 election he was re-elected by almost 20,000 votes. The Progressive Conservatives formed government under Mike Harris in 1995, and Sterling was appointed Minister of Small Business and Consumer Services on June 26 of that year. On August 16, 1996, he was promoted to Minister of Environment and Energy. On October 7, 1997, he became Government House Leader and was given the re-titled post of Minister of the Environment. As Minister of the Environment, Sterling oversaw cuts of nearly 50% to the ministry's budget and privatized provincial water testing labs, which an inquiry found contributed to the Walkerton E. coli outbreak the year after he left the portfolio. During the public inquiry, Sterling testified he had not read the province's drinking water rules and that drinking water was not a major priority for the Harris government. He also took responsibility for failing to read a warning from the health minister about shortfalls in the water-testing system.

In the provincial election of 1999, Sterling was returned for the restructured riding of Lanark-Carleton. He was appointed Minister of Intergovernmental Affairs and Government House Leader on June 17, 1999. Following a cabinet shuffle on February 8, 2001, he became Minister of Consumer and Business Services; he also served as Minister of Correctional Services from December 5, 2000 to March 8, 2001.

Harris ministry, Province of Ontario (1995–2002)
Cabinet posts (6)
| Predecessor | Office | Successor |
|---|---|---|
| Bob Runciman | Minister of Consumer and Business Services; 2001-2002 | Tim Hudak |
| Rob Sampson | Minister of Correctional Services; 2000-2001 | Rob Sampson |
| Dianne Cunningham | Minister of Intergovernmental Affairs; 1999-2001 | Brenda Elliott |
| Brenda Elliott | Minister of Environment and Energy; 1996-1999 | Tony Clement (Environment); Jim Wilson (Energy) |
| Marilyn Churley | Minister of Consumer and Commercial Relations; 1995-1996 | David Tsubouchi |
Special Parliamentary Responsibilities
| Predecessor | Title | Successor |
| David Johnson | Government House Leader; 1997-2001 | Janet Ecker |

=== Eves government ===
On April 15, 2002, after Ernie Eves replaced Mike Harris as Premier, Sterling was appointed Minister of Transportation. After a cabinet shuffle on February 25, 2003, he was promoted to the position of Attorney General, with responsibility for Native Affairs.

Eves ministry, Province of Ontario (2002–2003)
Cabinet posts (2)
| Predecessor | Office | Successor |
|---|---|---|
| David Young | Attorney General; 2003 (February–October); Also responsible for native affairs | Michael Bryant |
| David Turnbull | Minister of Transportation; 2001–2003 | Frank Klees |

=== In opposition (2nd time) ===
The Progressive Conservatives were defeated in the 2003 provincial election, although Sterling was able to defeat Liberal Marianne Wilkinson by about 6,000 votes.

In the 2004 leadership race, Sterling supported Jim Flaherty's unsuccessful bid to lead the Progressive Conservative Party.

In 2004, Sterling opposed parts of the legislation to create the GTA-area Greenbelt that did not allow easily removing protected status from designated land, and voted against the bill in 2005.

Lanark-Carleton was redistributed prior to the 2007 provincial election, and Sterling ran for re-election in the newly created riding of Carleton-Mississippi Mills, which had been created out of the eastern two-thirds of his old riding. He won by a convincing margin, defeating Liberal Megan Cornell by over 7,000 votes.

In the 2009 leadership race, Sterling supported the successful candidacy of Tim Hudak. However, the membership of his riding association supported rural-rights candidate Randy Hillier; Carleton-Mississippi Mills was one of only three ridings in the province where Hillier won a first-ballot victory.

In March 2011, Sterling was defeated in the race for his riding's PC nomination for the 2011 Ontario general election by Jack MacLaren, the former president of the Ontario Landowners Association, and left politics upon his term running out.

Sterling held multiple shadow cabinet portfolios during his second stint in opposition, such as critic for Democratic Renewal, critic for Health Promotion, critic for Intergovernmental Affairs, and Finance critic. He also served as the chair of the Standing Committee on Public Accounts during this period.

== After politics ==
In April 2021, Sterling was appointed by Premier Doug Ford as chair of the Greenbelt Council, replacing David Crombie, who resigned along with six other council members in December 2020 over Ford's intention to reduce the power of conservation authorities. Sterling will be in charge of Ford's plan to expand the Greenbelt, which was announced after public blowback from Crombie's resignation.
