= UEG =

UEG may refer to:

- European Union of Gymnastics (French: Union Européenne de Gymnastique), a sports federation
- Ubbo-Emmius-Gymnasium, a school in Leer, Germany
- Uniform electron gas
- Union-Elektricitäts-Gesellschaft, now part of AEG
- Universal Energy Group, a Canadian energy company
- United European Gastroenterology, a non-profit organisation combining European societies concerned with digestive health
- United Earth Government, A fictional organization that appeared in the film series "The Wandering Earth"
