= Jennifer Mossop =

Canadian journalist/politician

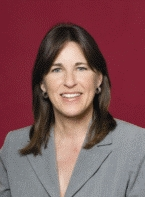

Ontario MPP
- In office 2003–2007
- Preceded by: Brad Clark
- Succeeded by: Riding abolished
- Constituency: Stoney Creek

Personal details
- Born: 1960 (age 65–66) Toronto, Ontario, Canada
- Party: Liberal
- Spouse: Dave Betts
- Children: 1
- Occupation: journalist, communications specialist
- Website: Mossop Media

Jennifer F. Mossop (born c. 1960) is a former politician and journalist in Ontario, Canada. She was a Liberal member of the Legislative Assembly of Ontario from 2003 to 2007 who represented the Hamilton, Ontario riding of Stoney Creek.

== Background ==
Prior to her election, Mossop was a well-known television news anchor and reporter in Hamilton, Ontario. She joined Hamilton television station CHCH-TV in 1981, and remained a member of the station's reporting team for more than twenty years. She also served as a news anchor for the Canadian Broadcasting Corporation, and wrote articles for the Hamilton Spectator. Mossop is married to Dave Betts, a musician, currently with the Canadian rock band Honeymoon Suite.

== Politics ==
Mossop's election to the Ontario legislature in the 2003 election took place under unusual circumstances. The original Liberal candidate for Stoney Creek was Tony Magnini, who was not generally regarded as a credible match for the Progressive Conservative incumbent, Brad Clark. Magnini was forced to resign after serious fraud allegations emerged in mid-campaign, however, and Mossop's last-minute candidacy reinvigorated the Liberal Party's organization in the riding. On election day, Mossop was able to defeat Clark by about 5,000 votes.

She was appointed parliamentary assistant to Madeleine Meilleur, the Minister of Culture, on October 23, 2003. She later served as parliamentary assistant to the new Minister of Culture Caroline Di Cocco.

In June 2007, Mossop announced she would not seek re-election in the 2007 provincial election. The Liberal Party chose another journalist, Nerene Virgin, as its candidate, but Virgin was defeated by New Democrat candidate Paul Miller in the redistributed riding of Hamilton East—Stoney Creek.

== After politics ==
She now runs her own public relations and media consulting firm, Mossop Media.
