= 1990 Progressive Conservative Party of Ontario leadership election =

- Date: May 12, 1990
- Convention: CNE Coliseum, Toronto, Ontario
- Resigning leader: Larry Grossman
- Won by: Mike Harris
- Ballots: 1
- Candidates: 2
- Entrance fee: ?
- Spending limit: ?

The 1990 Ontario Progressive Conservative leadership election was a leadership convention held in May 1990 to elect a new leader for the Progressive Conservative Party of Ontario. Two candidates vied for the leadership - Mike Harris and Dianne Cunningham. Using a novel voting system used due to party funding constraints, Harris was elected over Cunningham in a single ballot by a margin of 7,175 points to 5,825 points.

== Background ==
The convention was held to replace Larry Grossman who resigned following the 1987 provincial election in which he lost his seat and saw his party, which had ruled the province for 42 years until 1985, fall to third place. Andy Brandt served as interim leader for three years leading to the 1990 convention.

The Progressive Conservatives had been led by Red Tories William G. Davis from 1971 until 1985 and conservative elements in the party, particularly in the youth, believed that the moderate positions of the party leadership had led to its 1985 defeat. Their third-place finish in 1987 under Grossman, also a Red Tory, buttressed the argument that the party needed to move to the right. Conversely, the leader of the Conservatives during their fatal 1985 provincial election was Frank Miller, perceived as a right wing conservative who eschewed the Red Toryism of Davis and Grossman.

== Procedure ==
The 1990 leadership vote was the first in which the Tories used a weighted One Member One Vote system instead of the traditional delegated leadership convention. In the weighted OMOV system each riding of the 130 ridings was assigned 100 points for a total of 13,000 points. Members in each riding would vote and the total for each candidate would be represented by a proportion out of 100 (effectively a percentage). The disadvantage to the system was that ridings with many voting members would be treated as equal to those ridings with few voting members. The candidate with the most points province wide would be the winner.

Mike Harris represented the right wing position in the 1990 race and called for the scrapping of pay equity and the introduction of user fees for health care while his rival in the leadership race, Dianne Cunningham, was seen as on the progressive wing of the party and was supported by Red Tory stalwarts such as Hugh Segal and John Tory.

Both candidates were considered low-profile. Harris had briefly been a junior cabinet minister in Miller's short lived 1985 government while Cunningham was a rookie MPP who was elected in a 1988 by-election. Better known potential candidates such as Dennis Timbrell, Barbara McDougall, David Crombie, John Tory and party president Tom Long all turned down the chance to run.

Due to party debt, lingering after the 1987 election, the Conservative party decided not to hold a traditional convention. Instead, party members would vote in their respective ridings and the results would be faxed to Toronto for tabulation. Less than half of the eligible 33,000 eligible voters cast a vote. Due to the frugal nature of the convention and the voting innovation, the election received little media and public attention.

== First ballot ==
Candidate	1st ballot	
Name	Votes cast	%
Mike Harris	7,175	55.2
Dianne Cunningham	5,825	44.8
Total	13,000	100.0

The non-weighted vote totals were: Harris 8661, Cunningham 7189 using a preferential ballot, in which they ranked the candidates by preference, rather than vote in separate rounds.
