= Simcoe—Grey (provincial electoral district) =

Provincial electoral district in Ontario, Canada

Coordinates: 44.375°N 80.008°W

Ontario electoral district
- Simcoe—Grey in relation to Southern Ontario ridings

Provincial electoral district
- Legislature: Legislative Assembly of Ontario
MPP
Brian Saunderson
Progressive Conservative
- District created: 1999
- First contested: 1999
- Last contested: 2025

Demographics
- Population (2016): 129,940
- Electors (2018): 108,156
- Area (km²): 2,772
- Pop. density (per km²): 46.9
- Census division(s): Simcoe, Grey
- Census subdivision(s): New Tecumseth, Collingwood, Essa, Wasaga Beach, Clearview, Adjala-Tosorontio, Blue Mountains

Simcoe—Grey is a provincial electoral district in Ontario, Canada, that has been represented in the Legislative Assembly of Ontario since 1999. It was created in 1996 from parts of Barrie—Simcoe—Bradford, Bruce—Grey, Simcoe Centre, Simcoe North, Wellington—Grey—Dufferin—Simcoe, and York—Simcoe.

The electoral district consists of the municipalities of Blue Mountains, Collingwood, Clearview, Wasaga Beach, Springwater, Essa, New Tecumseth and Adjala-Tosorontio. It had a population of 117,505 in 2001, and an area of 2,515 km^{2}.

== History ==
The provincial electoral district was created in 1999 when provincial ridings were defined to have the same borders as federal ridings.

It consisted initially of:

- the part of the County of Simcoe lying to the west of and including the town of New Tecumseth and the township of Essa, to the west of and excluding the city of Barrie, to the east of and including the townships of Vespra and Flos, and to the south of and excluding the township of Tiny;
- in the County of Grey, the town of Thornbury, the villages of Flesherton and Markdale, and the townships of Artemesia, Collingwood, and Osprey.

In 2003, it was given its current boundaries as described above.

== Members of Provincial Parliament ==
This riding has elected the following members of the Legislative Assembly of Ontario:

Simcoe—Grey
Assembly	Years	Member	Party
Riding created from Barrie—Simcoe—Bradford, Bruce—Grey, Simcoe Centre, Simcoe North, and York—Simcoe
37th	1999–2003	Jim Wilson	Progressive Conservative
38th	2003–2007	Jim Wilson	Progressive Conservative
39th	2007–2011	Jim Wilson	Progressive Conservative
40th	2011–2014	Jim Wilson	Progressive Conservative
41st	2014–2018	Jim Wilson	Progressive Conservative
42nd	2018–2018	Jim Wilson	Progressive Conservative
42nd	2018–2022	Jim Wilson	Independent
43rd	2022–present	Brian Saunderson	Progressive Conservative

Wilson resigned from cabinet and the Progressive Conservative caucus on November 2, 2018, and continued the term as an independent MPP.

== Election results ==
Winning party in each polling division of Simcoe—Grey at the 2025 Ontario general election

2025 Ontario general election
Party	Candidate	Votes	%	±%
Progressive Conservative	Brian Saunderson	30,572	53.59	+2.41
Liberal	Ted Crysler	18,507	32.44	+10.34
New Democratic	Benten Tinkler	3,264	5.72	–5.34
Green	Allan Kuhn	3,154	5.53	–3.44
New Blue	David Ghobrial	1,554	2.72	–1.34
Total valid votes		57,051	99.32	
Total rejected, unmarked and declined ballots		392	0.68	+0.20
Turnout		57,443	44.18	+0.66
Eligible voters		130,012		
Progressive Conservative hold		Swing		–3.97
Source: Elections Ontario

Winning party in each polling division of Simcoe—Grey at the 2022 Ontario general election

2022 Ontario general election
Party	Candidate	Votes	%	±%
Progressive Conservative	Brian Saunderson	27,067	51.18	–4.75
Liberal	Ted Crysler	11,687	22.10	+7.70
New Democratic	Keith Nunn	5,849	11.06	–10.99
Green	Allan Kuhn	4,742	8.97	+2.09
New Blue	David Ghobrial	2,147	4.06	–
Ontario Party	Rodney Sacrey	1,039	1.96	–
None of the Above	Billy G Gordon	355	0.67	–
Total valid votes		52,886	99.52	
Total rejected, unmarked and declined ballots		255	0.48	–0.78
Turnout		53,141	43.52	–13.56
Eligible voters		122,113		
Progressive Conservative gain from Independent		Swing		–6.22
Source: Elections Ontario

2018 Ontario general election
Party	Candidate	Votes	%	±%
Progressive Conservative	Jim Wilson	34,094	55.93	+8.53
New Democratic	David Matthews	13,444	22.05	+7.72
Liberal	Dan Hambly	8,780	14.40	–14.40
Green	Jesseca Perry	4,192	6.88	–1.01
Libertarian	John Wright	453	0.74	–
Total valid votes		60,963	98.74	
Total rejected, unmarked and declined ballots		775	1.26	
Turnout		61,738	57.08	
Eligible voters		108,156		
Progressive Conservative notional hold		Swing		+0.41
Source: Elections Ontario

2014 general election redistributed results
Party	Vote	%
Progressive Conservative	22,288	47.39
Liberal	14,296	30.40
New Democratic	6,739	14.33
Green	3,707	7.88

2014 Ontario general election
Party	Candidate	Votes	%	±%
Progressive Conservative	Jim Wilson	25,988	47.12	–7.21
Liberal	Lorne Kenney	17,199	31.18	+8.88
New Democratic	David Matthews	7,793	14.13	–0.53
Green	Jesseca Dudun	4,172	7.56	–1.13
Total valid votes		55,152	98.42	
Total rejected, unmarked and declined ballots		886	1.58	+1.23
Turnout		56,038	52.00	+3.88
Eligible voters		107,762		
Progressive Conservative hold		Swing		–8.04
Source: Elections Ontario

2011 Ontario general election
Party	Candidate	Votes	%	±%
Progressive Conservative	Jim Wilson	25,339	54.33	+3.68
Liberal	Donna Kenwell	10,404	22.31	–3.67
New Democratic	David Matthews	6,839	14.66	+5.45
Green	Mike Schreiner	4,057	8.70	–2.63
Total valid votes		46,639	99.65	
Total rejected, unmarked and declined ballots		166	0.35	–0.31
Turnout		46,805	48.12	–6.75
Eligible voters		97,272		
Progressive Conservative hold		Swing		+3.68
Source: Elections Ontario

2007 Ontario general election
Party	Candidate	Votes	%	±%
Progressive Conservative	Jim Wilson	24,270	50.65	–0.82
Liberal	Steven Fishman	12,447	25.97	–8.53
Green	Peter Ellis	5,428	11.33	+9.60
New Democratic	Katy Austin	4,417	9.22	–0.70
Libertarian	Philip Bender	724	1.51	+0.70
Family Coalition	Steven J. Taylor	361	0.75	–0.83
Independent	Owen Ferguson	273	0.57	–
Total valid votes		47,920	99.34	
Total rejected, unmarked and declined ballots		319	0.66	+0.13
Turnout		48,239	54.86	–5.43
Eligible voters		87,926		
Progressive Conservative hold		Swing		+3.85
Source: Elections Ontario

2003 Ontario general election
Party	Candidate	Votes	%	±%
Progressive Conservative	Jim Wilson	26,114	51.47	–14.53
Liberal	Mark Redmond	17,505	34.50	+8.06
New Democratic	Leo Losereit	5,032	9.92	+2.36
Green	Geoffrey Maile	875	1.72	–
Family Coalition	Steven J. Taylor	801	1.58	–
Libertarian	Philip Bender	411	0.81	–
Total valid votes		50,738	99.46	
Total rejected, unmarked and declined ballots		273	0.54	–0.23
Turnout		51,011	60.30	+0.08
Eligible voters		84,602		
Progressive Conservative hold		Swing		–11.29
Source: Elections Ontario

1999 Ontario general election
Party	Candidate	Votes	%
Progressive Conservative	Jim Wilson	31,984	66.00
Liberal	Norman Sandberg	12,815	26.44
New Democratic	Mary Hart	3,662	7.56
Total valid votes		48,461	99.23
Total rejected, unmarked and declined ballots		375	0.77
Turnout		48,836	60.21
Eligible voters		81,107	
Progressive Conservative pickup new district.			
Source: Elections Ontario

== 2007 electoral reform referendum ==
2007 Ontario electoral reform referendum
Side	Votes	%
First Past the Post	31,429	66.8
Mixed member proportional	15,659	33.2
Total valid votes	47,088	100.0

== See also ==
- List of Ontario provincial electoral districts
- Canadian provincial electoral districts
