= Stoney Creek (provincial electoral district) =

Former federal electoral district in Ontario, Canada

Ontario electoral district

Defunct provincial electoral district
- Legislature: Legislative Assembly of Ontario
- District created: 1999
- District abolished: 2003
- First contested: 1999
- Last contested: 2003

Stoney Creek was an electoral district in Ontario, Canada, that was represented in the legislative Assembly of Ontario from 1999 to 2007. It was located in the Hamilton area of Southern Ontario. The riding was created out of Wentworth East and Lincoln.

It consisted of the City of Stoney Creek, the Township of Glanbrook, and the southeast part of the City of Hamilton, and the Town of Grimsby.

The electoral district was abolished in 2003 when it was redistributed between Hamilton East—Stoney Creek, Hamilton Mountain and Niagara West—Glanbrook ridings.

== Members of Provincial Parliament ==
Stoney Creek
| Assembly | Years | Member | Party |
|---|---|---|---|
Riding created from Wentworth East and Lincoln
| 37th | 1999–2003 | Brad Clark | Progressive Conservative |
| 38th | 2003–2007 | Jennifer Mossop | Liberal |
Riding dissolved into Hamilton East—Stoney Creek, Hamilton Mountain and Niagara West—Glanbrook

== Election results ==
2003 Ontario general election
| Party | Candidate | Votes | % | ±% |
|---|---|---|---|---|
| Liberal | Jennifer Mossop | 24,751 | 48.93 | +8.94 |
| Progressive Conservative | Brad Clark | 19,517 | 38.58 | –6.97 |
| New Democratic | Lorrie McKibbon | 5,419 | 10.71 | +0.26 |
| Green | Richard Safka | 898 | 1.78 | – |
| Total valid votes | | 50,585 | 99.34 | |
| Total rejected, unmarked and declined ballots | | 334 | 0.66 | –0.68 |
| Turnout | | 50,919 | 62.01 | –0.09 |
| Eligible voters | | 82,118 | | |
| Liberal gain from Progressive Conservative | | Swing | | +7.96 |
Source: Elections Ontario

1999 Ontario general election
| Party | Candidate | Votes | % |
|---|---|---|---|
| Progressive Conservative | Brad Clark | 21,462 | 45.56 |
| Liberal | Chris Phillips | 18,840 | 39.99 |
| New Democratic | Robert Barlow | 4,922 | 10.45 |
| Family Coalition | Phil Lees | 1,206 | 2.56 |
| Independent | Paul G. Lane | 350 | 0.74 |
| Natural Law | Sue Marchand | 330 | 0.70 |
| Total valid votes | | 47,110 | 98.66 |
| Total rejected, unmarked and declined ballots | | 639 | 1.34 |
| Turnout | | 47,749 | 62.10 |
| Eligible voters | | 76,888 | |
| Progressive Conservative pickup new district. | | | |
Source: Elections Ontario
