= Elizabeth Witmer =

Canadian politician

The Honourable Elizabeth Witmer OOnt ECO
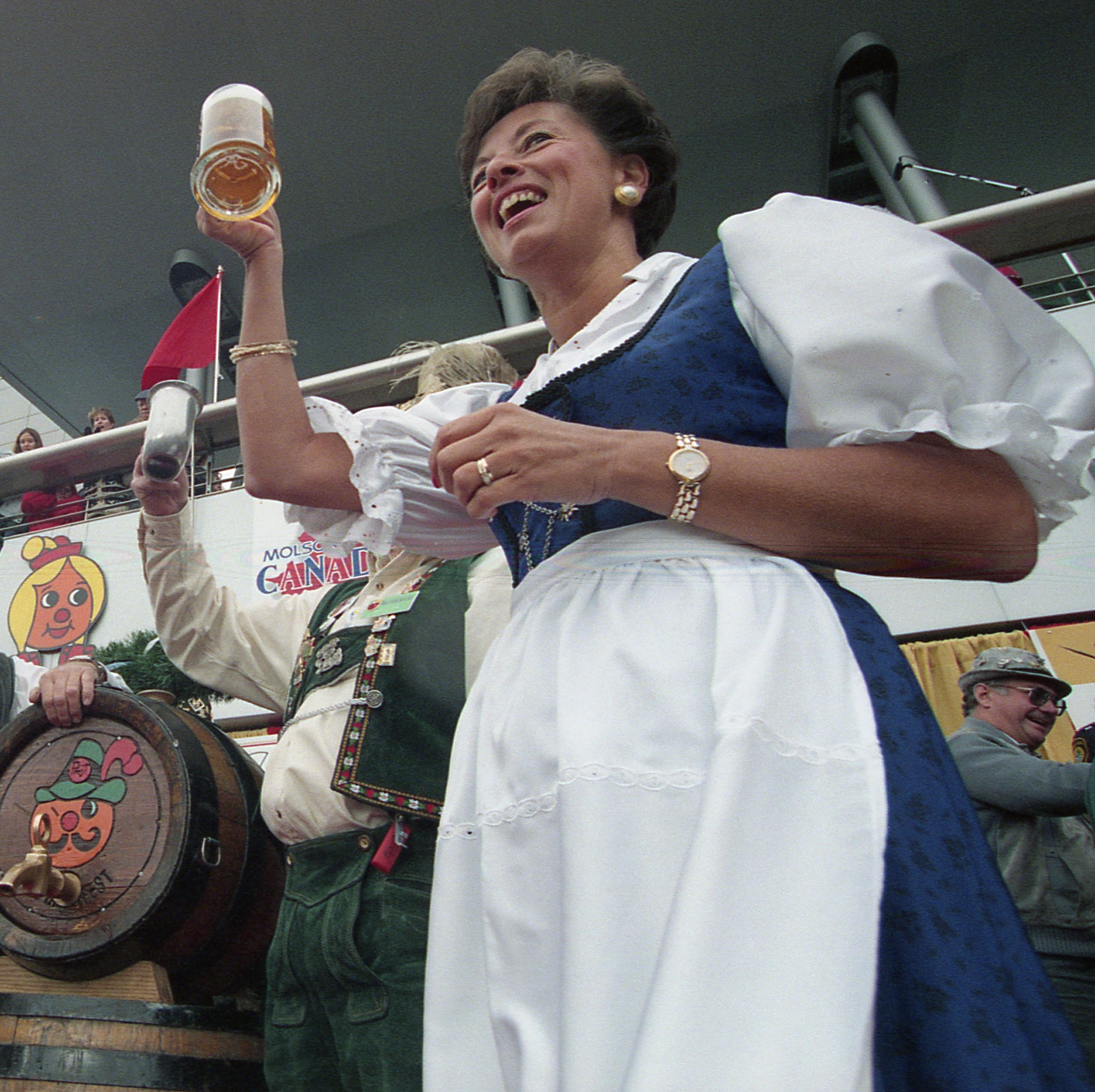
- Witmer in 1996

Chair of the Workplace Safety & Insurance Board
- In office April 27, 2012 – January 26, 2022
- Preceded by: Steve Mahoney

7th Deputy Premier of Ontario
- In office April 15, 2002 – October 22, 2003
- Premier: Ernie Eves
- Preceded by: Jim Flaherty
- Succeeded by: George Smitherman (2006)

Ontario MPP
- In office 1999–2012
- Preceded by: Riding established
- Succeeded by: Catherine Fife
- Constituency: Kitchener—Waterloo
- In office 1990–1999
- Preceded by: Herb Epp
- Succeeded by: Riding abolished
- Constituency: Waterloo North

Personal details
- Born: Elizabeth Gosar; October 16, 1946 (age 79) Schiedam, Netherlands
- Party: Progressive Conservative
- Education: University of Western Ontario; Althouse College of Education; University of Waterloo
- Profession: Teacher

Elizabeth Witmer OOnt ECO (née Gosar; born October 16, 1946) is a former Deputy Premier of Ontario, Canada. She was a member of the Legislative Assembly of Ontario from 1990 until 2012, representing Waterloo North and later Kitchener—Waterloo as a member of the Progressive Conservative Party.

In 2012, she was appointed as chair of the Workplace Safety & Insurance Board.

== Background ==
Witmer was born in Schiedam, Netherlands. She moved with her family to Ontario at a young age. She received a Bachelor of Arts degree from the University of Western Ontario, and later attended the Althouse College of Education. She did postgraduate work at the University of Waterloo. Witmer worked as a secondary school teacher from 1968 to 1980, in West Lorne, London and Guelph. She was named the "Kitchener-Waterloo Woman of the Year" in 1968.

== Politics ==
Witmer began her political career as a school trustee, serving on the Waterloo County Board of Education from 1980 to 1990; she became its chair in 1984. She ran for the Ontario legislature in the 1987 election, but was defeated by Ontario Liberal Party Member of Provincial Parliament (MPP) Herb Epp in Waterloo North.

Epp retired before the 1990 provincial election, and Witmer again won the Progressive Conservative nomination in the riding. She was successful this time, defeating New Democrat Hugh Miller and Liberal Andrew Telegdi (later a federal Member of Parliament) to become the first female MPP to be elected in the region of Waterloo. The NDP scored an upset victory in this election while the Progressive Conservatives won only 20 of 130 seats for third-party status.

=== Cabinet appointment ===
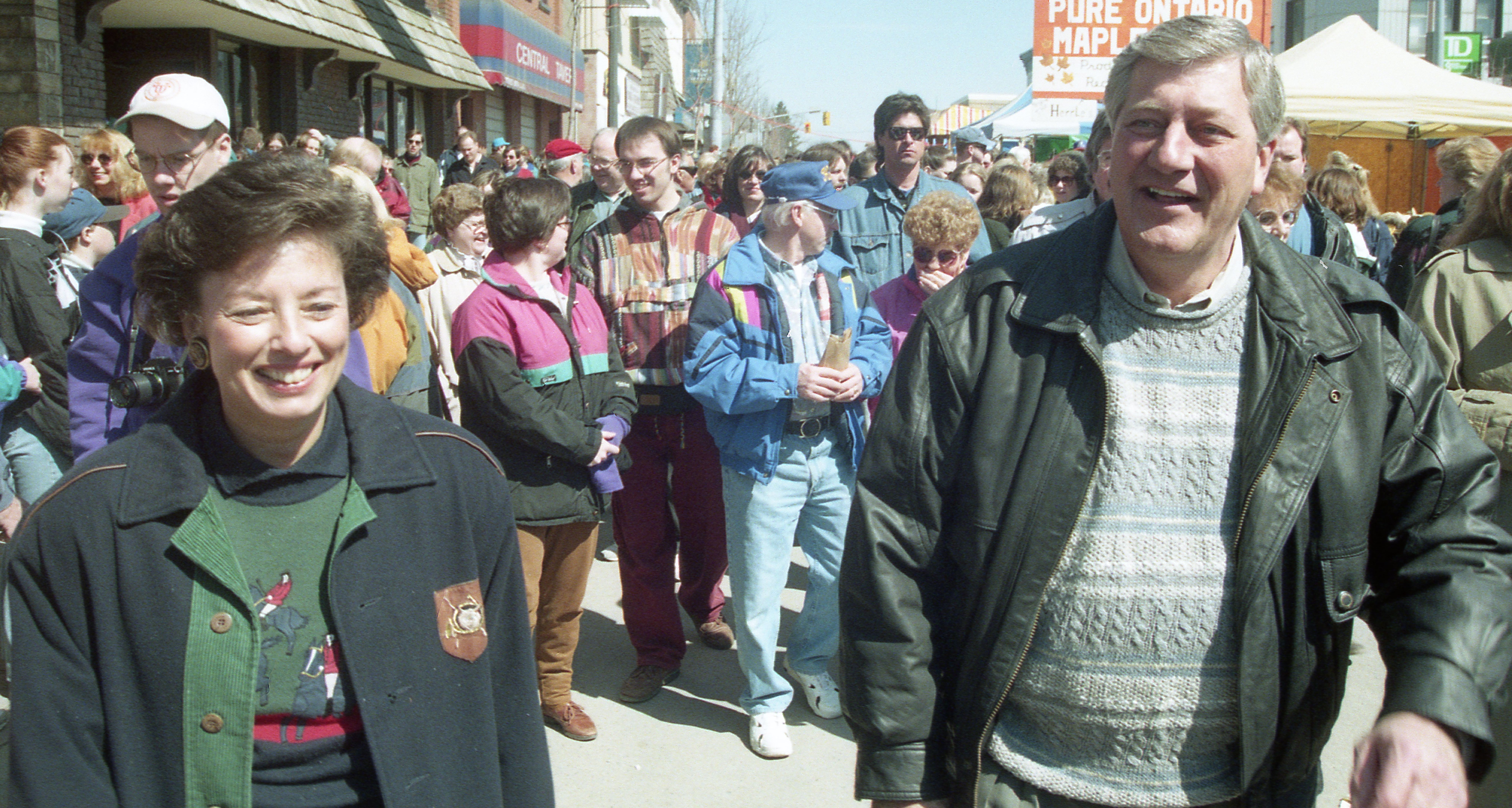
Witmer in Elmira with Premier Mike Harris in 1996

There was a significant swing to the Progressive Conservatives in the 1995 provincial election, and Witmer was re-elected by more than 17,000 votes over her nearest opponent. On June 26, 1995, she was appointed Minister of Labour in the government of Mike Harris. In October 1997, she was promoted to the key portfolio of Minister of Health, replacing the more confrontational Jim Wilson.

Harris's government was initially regarded by many as uniformly right-wing, although moderate Red Tory figures such as Witmer and Isabel Bassett eventually emerged in key portfolios. Witmer's appointment as Minister of Health was generally interpreted as signalling that the government desired a more moderate approach to negotiations with the health sector. Despite this, she presided over a controversial restructuring process which included a number of government cutbacks.

Witmer was re-elected in the 1999 election, defeating Liberal Sean Strickland by just under 10,000 votes. On June 17, 1999 her portfolio was renamed the Ministry of Health and Long-Term Care. Following a cabinet shuffle on February 8, 2001, she became Minister of the Environment.

=== Ministerial Accomplishments ===
==== Workplace Safety and Insurance Act, 1996 ====
During her term as Minister of Labour Ms. Witmer overhauled the Worker's Compensation Act, renaming it the Workplace Safety and Insurance Act and introduced entitlement benefits for mental stress for the first time.

=== Cabinet positions ===
Eves ministry, Province of Ontario (2002–2003)
Cabinet posts (2)
Predecessor	Office	Successor
Jim Flaherty	Deputy Premier of Ontario; 2002–2003	George Smitherman (Note: There was no Deputy Premier named from 2003-2006 until Smitherman was appointed by Dalton McGuinty.)
Janet Ecker	Minister of Education; 2002–2003	Gerard Kennedy
Harris ministry, Province of Ontario (1995–2002)
Cabinet posts (3)
Predecessor	Office	Successor
Dan Newman	Minister of the Environment; 2001–2002	Chris Stockwell
Jim Wilson	Minister of Health (Note: Renamed as Ministry of Health and Long-term Care in 1999.); 1997–2001	Tony Clement
Shirley Coppen	Minister of Labour; 1995–1997	Jim Flaherty

=== 2002 PC leadership campaign and afterward ===
She ran in the 2002 PC leadership election to succeed Harris as Tory leader and Premier, but placed fourth on the first ballot and threw her support to the eventual winner, Ernie Eves. In April 2002, she was appointed Deputy Premier and Minister of Education.

The 2003 election saw a significant backlash against the Conservative government. Witmer was re-elected in Kitchener—Waterloo defeating Strickland by a reduced margin of 1,501 votes. Moreover, she is considered to be one of the few moderates in a caucus dominated by the right wing of the party. She was named as deputy leader of the opposition, and serves as her party's critic on long-term care and women's issues.

Witmer considered running to succeed Eves in the 2004 PC leadership election, but ultimately supported John Tory's successful candidacy instead. Tory re-appointed Witmer as deputy leader. Her appointment was considered a notable victory for the centrist wing of the party. In the 2007 provincial election, Witmer won re-election by 4,917 votes.

In 2007, Equal Voice, a non-partisan organization dedicated to improving the status of women in politics, conducted an "Ontario's Greatest Female Premier" contest to name the woman in politics whom respondents felt would make the best Premier of Ontario. Witmer won the contest, ahead of political activist Georgina Bencsik and federal Member of Parliament Olivia Chow.

=== Resignation and appointment to WSIB ===
On April 27, 2012 Witmer announced that she was resigning as an MPP, just seven months after the last election, and had accepted an appointment to head the Workplace Safety & Insurance Board. She succeeded Steve Mahoney as chair. She revealed in September 2012 that she chose to accept the WSIB position because her husband Cam had recently been diagnosed with cancer. She stopped being chair on January 26, 2022.

== Chair of Workplace Safety and Insurance Board (WSIB) ==
As chair of one of North America's largest insurance companies, Witmer was responsible for overseeing the WSIB's transformation to a modern and sustainable workplace insurance system. One of Witmer's most notable accomplishments as Chair was the elimination of the unfunded liability (UFL) in 2018, almost a decade ahead of the legislated timeline of 2027. For the first time in recent history the WSIB was over 100% funded.

== See also ==
- List of University of Waterloo people
