= Ministry of Intergovernmental Affairs (Ontario) =

- Ministère des Affaires intergouvernementales (French)
- Government of Ontario wordmark

Ministry overview
- Formed: 1978
- Jurisdiction: Government of Ontario
- Minister responsible: Doug Ford, Minister of Intergovernmental Affairs
- Website: ontario.ca/page/ministry-intergovernmental-affairs

The Ministry of Intergovernmental Affairs is responsible for intergovernmental affairs between the Canadian province of Ontario and the other provinces and territories and the Canadian government. The ministry's goal is to strengthen national unity and Ontario's role within Canada. The current minister is Doug Ford, who also serves as the premier of Ontario; the position is often held concurrently by the premier.

The Provincial Secretary and Registrar of Ontario, Minister of Economics and Provincial Relations and Ministry of Federal-Provincial Relations were the positions formerly responsible for intergovernmental affairs.

== List of ministers ==
Portrait	Name	Term of office		Tenure	Political party (Ministry)	Note
Treasurer and Minister of Economics and Intergovernmental Affairs					PC (Davis)	
	Charles MacNaughton	September 7, 1972	March 15, 1973	130 days	PC (Davis)	
	John White	January 15, 1973	June 18, 1975	2 years, 154 days	PC (Davis)	
	Darcy McKeough	June 18, 1975	August 16, 1978	3 years, 59 days	PC (Davis)	
	Frank Miller	August 16, 1978	August 30, 1979	1 year, 14 days	PC (Davis)	
Minister of Intergovernmental Affairs					PC (Davis)	
	Thomas Leonard Wells	August 30, 1979	February 8, 1985	6 years, 176 days	PC (Davis)	
	Frank Miller	February 8, 1985	May 1, 1985	82 days	PC (Miller)	Concurrently Premier
	Reuben Baetz	May 17, 1985	June 26, 1985	40 days	PC (Miller)	
	David Peterson	June 26, 1985	October 1, 1990	5 years, 97 days	Liberal (Peterson)	Concurrently Premier
	Bob Rae	October 1, 1990	February 1, 1993	4 years, 268 days	NDP (Rae)	Concurrently Premier
	Dianne Cunningham	June 26, 1995	June 17, 1999	3 years, 356 days	PC (Harris)	
	Norm Sterling	June 17, 1999	February 8, 2001	1 year, 236 days	PC (Harris)	
	Brenda Elliott	February 8, 2001	April 14, 2002	1 year, 65 days	PC (Harris)	
	Ernie Eves	April 15, 2002	October 22, 2003	1 year, 190 days	PC (Eves)	Concurrently Premier
	Dalton McGuinty	October 23, 2003	July 29, 2005	1 year, 279 days	Liberal (McGuinty)	Concurrently Premier
	Marie Bountrogianni	July 29, 2005	October 30, 2007	2 years, 93 days	Liberal (McGuinty)	
	Dalton McGuinty	October 30, 2007	January 18, 2010	2 years, 80 days	Liberal (McGuinty)	Concurrently Premier
	Monique Smith	January 18, 2010	October 20, 2011	1 year, 275 days	Liberal (McGuinty)	
	Dalton McGuinty	October 20, 2011	February 11, 2013	1 year, 114 days	Liberal (McGuinty)	Concurrently Premier
	Laurel Broten	February 11, 2013	July 2, 2013	141 days	Liberal (Wynne)	
	Kathleen Wynne	February 11, 2013	June 29, 2018	5 years, 138 days	Liberal (Wynne)	Concurrently Premier
	Doug Ford	June 29, 2018	present	8 years, 95 days	PC (Ford)	Concurrently Premier

Note: James Allan is named "Minister of Economics and Federal and Provincial Relations" from January 27, 1961 to November 8, 1961.

== See also ==
- Foreign relations of Canada
- Alberta International and Intergovernmental Relations
- Quebec Ministry of International Relations
