= Jim Wilson (Ontario politician) =

Retired Canadian politician

The Honourable Jim Wilson ECO
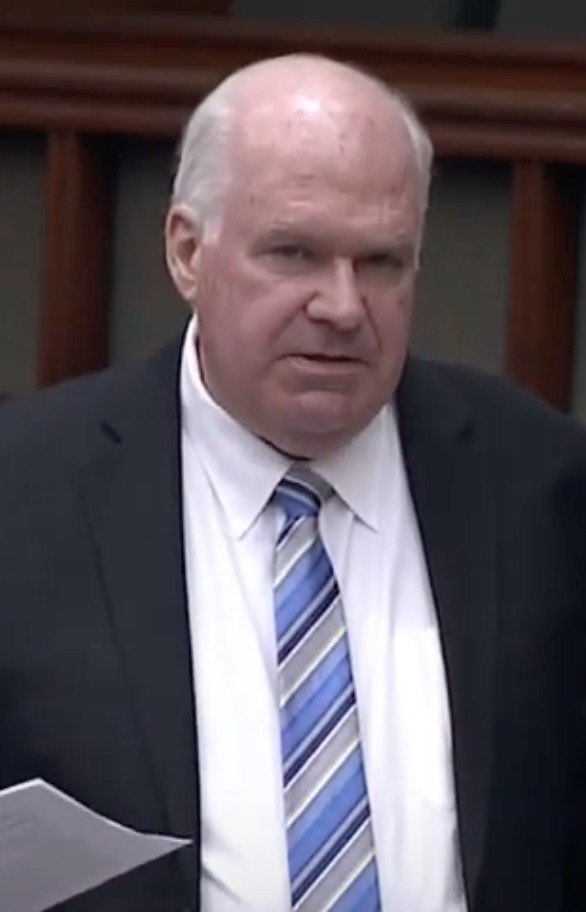
- Wilson in 2020

Minister of Economic Development, Job Creation and Trade
- In office June 29, 2018 – November 2, 2018
- Premier: Doug Ford
- Preceded by: Steven Del Duca
- Succeeded by: Todd Smith

Leader of the Official Opposition
- In office July 2, 2014 – September 14, 2015
- Preceded by: Tim Hudak
- Succeeded by: Patrick Brown

Interim Leader of the Progressive Conservative Party of Ontario
- In office July 2, 2014 – May 9, 2015
- Preceded by: Tim Hudak
- Succeeded by: Patrick Brown

Member of the Ontario Provincial Parliament for Simcoe—Grey Simcoe West (1990–1999)
- In office September 6, 1990 – May 3, 2022
- Preceded by: George McCague
- Succeeded by: Brian Saunderson

Dean of the Legislative Assembly of Ontario
- In office June 7, 2018 – May 3, 2022 Serving with Ted Arnott and Gilles Bisson
- Preceded by: Jim Bradley

Personal details
- Born: April 4, 1963 (age 63) Alliston, Ontario, Canada
- Party: Independent (since 2018)
- Other political affiliations: Progressive Conservative (1990-2018)
- Occupation: Politician

Jim Wilson ECO (born April 4, 1963) is a retired Canadian politician in Ontario, Canada. He served as a member of the Legislative Assembly of Ontario representing the riding of Simcoe—Grey, and its predecessor riding of Simcoe West, from 1990 to 2022. He sat as a member of the Progressive Conservative Party of Ontario caucus from his first election until November 2, 2018, when he resigned from caucus due to allegations of sexual misconduct. While part of the PC caucus, Wilson was chosen by his fellow caucus members on July 2, 2014, to serve as interim leader of the party and Leader of the Opposition following the resignation of Tim Hudak. He continued to serve as Leader of the Opposition until September 2015 when new party leader, Patrick Brown, entered the legislature through a by-election. He was reelected in June 2018, but resigned from cabinet and the Progressive Conservative caucus on November 2, 2018. He sat as an independent member for the remainder of the 42nd Parliament of Ontario and did not seek re-election in the 2022 Ontario general election.

== Background ==
Wilson was educated at St. Michael's College at the University of Toronto where he served as student council president and as a member of the university's governing council. During and after his graduation, he worked as an assistant to Ontario Management Board chair George McCague, and subsequently worked for federal cabinet minister Perrin Beatty.

== Politics ==
=== In opposition ===
In the 1990 provincial election, he was elected in Simcoe West by 1940 votes over New Democrat Leo Loserit. The NDP won a majority government in this election, while the Tories won only 20 seats of 130 for third-party status. In September 1991, Wilson was appointed as party Critic for health policy.

=== Harris government ===
There was a significant swing to the Progressive Conservatives in the 1995 provincial election, and Wilson was re-elected by almost 20,000 votes over his nearest opponent. On June 26, 1995, he was appointed Minister of Health in the government of Mike Harris.

As health minister, Wilson resigned in the wake of allegations that a member of his staff improperly obtained and leaked confidential information about a cardiologist's income as part of a bid to discredit a vocal opponent in the continuing dispute over government cutbacks in doctors' incomes. The personal information leaked was deemed to be without the knowledge of, or at the request of the minister or ministry staff.

In October 1997, Wilson was named as Minister of Energy, Science and Technology.

After redistribution, Wilson ran for re-election in the 1999 provincial election in the new seat of Simcoe—Grey. He defeated his nearest opponent, Liberal Norman Sandberg, by over 19,000 votes.

Harris ministry, Province of Ontario (1995–2002)
Cabinet posts (2)
Predecessor	Office	Successor
Norm Sterling	Minister of Energy, Science & Technology; 1997–2002	Chris Stockwell (Energy only)
Ruth Grier	Minister of Health; 1995–1996, 1997 (Note: Resigned December 9, 1996, re-instated February 21, 1997)	Elizabeth Witmer

=== Eves Government ===
He was retained in the Energy, Science and Technology portfolio until April 2002, when Ernie Eves replaced Mike Harris as Premier. Eves named Wilson as Minister of Northern Development and Mines, and Chair of the Northern Ontario Heritage Fund Corporation. On June 17, 2003, he was also named Minister of Environment.

Eves ministry, Province of Ontario (2002–2003)
Cabinet posts (2)
Predecessor	Office	Successor
Chris Stockwell	Minister of Environment; 2003 (June–October)	Leona Dombrowsky
Dan Newman	Minister of Northern Development and Mines; 2002–2003	Rick Bartolucci

=== Opposition (2nd time) ===
The Progressive Conservatives were defeated in the 2003 election, although Wilson retained Simcoe—Grey by a reduced margin. In 2004, he supported John Tory's successful bid to replace Eves as party leader. In 2009, he supported Tim Hudak's successful bid to replace Tory as party leader.

He was re-elected to the Ontario Legislature on October 10, 2007, defeating his nearest opponent by 11,711 votes. He was re-elected again in the 2011 election for his sixth term defeating his nearest opponent by 14,935 votes. He was re-elected by a slimmer margin in the 2014 provincial election.

Under Hudak, from 2011 to 2014, Wilson served as Opposition House Leader.

==== Interim leadership ====
Following Hudak's resignation, Wilson was chosen interim leader by caucus on July 2, 2014, defeating John Yakabuski and Randy Hillier and served until a leadership election was held in May 2015 which chose Patrick Brown as Hudak's permanent successor. In the fall of 2015, Wilson then returned to his role as Opposition House Leader.

=== Ford government and resignation from PC caucus ===
Wilson was sworn in as Minister of Economic Development, Job Creation and Trade when the ministry was formed. Wilson resigned from cabinet and the Progressive Conservative caucus on November 2, 2018. A statement from the Office of the Premier stated that his resignation was to "seek treatment for substance addiction". Media later reported that Wilson's resignation was related to allegations of sexual misconduct against him. The Premier's Office initially refused to confirm or deny the reports. However, Premier Doug Ford confirmed on November 7, 2018, that Wilson was asked to resign from caucus in response to allegations of sexual misconduct; Ford further added that his office had initially claimed publicly that Wilson's resignation was for substance abuse treatment to protect the complainant.

Ford ministry, Province of Ontario (2018–present)
Cabinet post (1)
Predecessor	Office	Successor
Steven Del Duca	Minister of Economic Development, Job Creation and Trade; June 29, 2018 – November 2, 2018	Todd Smith

In September 2020, after having served 30 years in the legislature, Wilson announced that he will not seek re-election.
