= Universal Energy Corporation =

Canadian electric and natural gas company

Universal Energy Corporation is a Canadian electric utility and natural gas retailer headquartered in Toronto, Ontario, with offices throughout North America. It focuses on long-term sales of residential, commercial, and industrial natural gas in the provinces of Ontario and British Columbia. It is a wholly owned subsidiary of Universal Energy Group. Has offices across North America

- Partners with other oil and gas companies to pursue oil and gas prospects
- Trades on the Toronto Stock Exchange under the symbol UEG

== History ==
In January 2009, the Ontario Energy Board announced that it intended to fine Universal Energy Corporation $200,000CA for making "false, misleading or deceptive statements to consumers." The announcement was the first such announcement since June 2003.

Canadian Billionaire Mark Silver is the company's founder and CEO.

Ontario MPP Frank Klees sits on its board. Klees also received the single biggest contribution to his campaign to run as leader of the Progressive Conservative Party of Ontario from OPTUS Capital Corporation owned by Silver.

Universal Energy Corporation, a Canadian electric utility and natural gas retailer headquartered in Toronto, Ontario, has a focus on long-term sales of residential, commercial, and industrial natural gas in the provinces of Ontario and British Columbia. As a wholly owned subsidiary of Universal Energy Group, it plays a significant role in the energy sector.

== Recent Developments and Leadership ==
- Mark Silver, a Canadian billionaire, is the company’s founder and CEO.
- Frank Klees, an Ontario Member of Provincial Parliament (MPP), serves on the board of Universal Energy Corporation. Notably, Klees received substantial campaign contributions from OPTUS Capital Corporation, which is owned by Silver.

== Controversy and Regulatory Action ==
- In January 2009, the Ontario Energy Board announced its intention to fine Universal Energy Corporation $200,000CA for making “false, misleading, or deceptive statements to consumers.” This marked the first such announcement since June 2003.

== See also ==
- Electricity policy of Ontario
