= Tom Long (politician) =

Canadian political consultant (born 1958)

Tom Long (born 1958) is a lawyer and political activist. He is a director of the Manning Centre for Building Democracy. He chaired former Ontario premier Mike Harris’s victorious 1995 and 1999 election campaigns and was one of the authors of Harris' Common Sense Revolution platform. Long was president of the Progressive Conservative Party of Ontario from 1986 to 1989.

In 1983, Long was Brian Mulroney's youth campaign chair for the 1983 federal Progressive Conservative leadership convention and served as an executive assistant in the Prime Minister's Office from 1984 to 1986, during Mulroney's tenure as Prime Minister of Canada.

Long co-chaired the founding convention of the Canadian Alliance in January 2000 and was a candidate for the party's leadership later that year placing third with 18.16% of the vote.

Long was an advisor to Ontario PC leader Tim Hudak in the 2014 provincial election. He and Hudak's campaign manager, Ian Robertson, steered Hudak into promising to slash 100,000 civil service jobs. The often-repeated assertion was cited by party members and commentators as a principal reason for the Tories' disastrous rout.

A lawyer by profession, Long is a former partner of Egon Zehnder and Russell Reynolds Associates, who set up his own Governance and Executive Search firm, Tom Long Consulting, in early 2014.
