= Frank Klees =

Canadian politician

The Honourable Frank Klees ECO

Ontario MPP
- In office 1995–2014
- Preceded by: Charles Beer
- Succeeded by: Chris Ballard
- Constituency: Newmarket—Aurora; Oak Ridges (1999-2007); York—Mackenzie (1995-1999)

Personal details
- Born: March 6, 1951 (age 75) Landau, West Germany
- Party: Progressive Conservative
- Occupation: Businessman

Frank Klees (born March 6, 1951) is a former politician in Ontario, Canada. He was a Progressive Conservative member of the Legislative Assembly of Ontario from 1995 to 2014. He was a cabinet minister in the governments of Mike Harris and Ernie Eves.

== Background ==
Klees was born in Landau, West Germany. His parents were Danube Swabians, German pioneers whose ancestors settled in parts of eastern Europe that would later be known as Hungary and Yugoslavia. At the age of five, Klees came with his family to Canada and settled in Leamington, Ontario. He worked as a businessman in the financial services sector with Canada Life Assurance. He then became an entrepreneur, and started a sports agency which represented professional athletes. Klees also co-founded the Municipal Gas Corporation in 1990, and served as its executive vice-president until 1997.

Klees sat on the board of the controversial Universal Energy Corporation, a natural gas and electricity retailer which has been fined by the Ontario Energy Board on several occasions and frequently criticised by its own customers as being a scam. When Universal was bought out by Just Energy he was presented a seat on the board of their Exchange corporation.

From 1992 to 1994, he was third vice-president and policy chair of the Progressive Conservative Party of Ontario. Klees lives in Aurora, Ontario.

Klees is currently a registered lobbyist working on behalf of the development industry.

== Politics ==
Klees ran for the Ontario legislature in the 1975 provincial election, losing to Liberal Remo Mancini in the southwestern riding of Essex South. He lost to Mancini a second time in the 1977 election.

Klees was elected to the legislature in the election of 1995, defeating former Liberal leadership candidate Charles Beer in York—Mackenzie. He was easily re-elected in the 1999 provincial election running in the new riding of Oak Ridges. On June 17, 1999 he was appointed to the cabinet of Premier Mike Harris as Chief Government Whip, Deputy House Leader and Minister without Portfolio.

In 2000, Klees was preparing to run as a candidate for the leadership of the new Canadian Alliance, but withdrew because one of his key financial backers insisted on a last-minute deal to make a significant funding commitment conditional on Klees throwing his support to one of the other candidates on the second ballot.

Klees stepped down from his ministerial position on July 30, 2001 for what he described as personal reasons. After returning to the backbenches for a year, he was reappointed to cabinet on October 3, 2002 as Minister of Tourism under Harris' successor, Ernie Eves. On February 25, 2003, he became Minister of Transportation, and served in that position until the defeat of the Eves government in the October 2003 election.

Klees was re-elected in 2003, and was a candidate in the 2004 Ontario Progressive Conservative leadership election which took place on September 18, 2004. He was endorsed by Tory MPPs Jerry Ouellette, Ted Chudleigh and Bill Murdoch, and groups such as the Conservative Youth Coalition. The other candidates in the race were Whitby-Ajax MPP Jim Flaherty and former Rogers Communications CEO John Tory. Klees made healthcare his biggest priority in the campaign. He was the only candidate to openly endorse a semi-privatized health care system. Other key issues of his campaign were school choice, physical education in the school system, OHIP statements, and foreign-trained doctors applying for employment. Klees was eliminated from the contest after placing third on the first ballot; Tory subsequently won on the second ballot. Klees increased his profile during the campaign, and became the Critic for Education and Citizenship & Immigration in the Legislature as well as a member of the Justice Committee.

Klees was elected in the newly created provincial riding of Newmarket-Aurora in the 2007 Ontario general election. He was re-elected in the 2011 Ontario election.

Klees contested the 2009 leadership race, placing second behind the winner, Tim Hudak. The single biggest campaign contribution of $32,000 was made by OPTUS Capital Corporation, owned by Universal Energy Corporation's founder and CEO Mark Silver. It accounted for 20% of the total contributions. Klees made a "surprisingly impolitic concession speech", and it was reported that he had a cool relationship with Hudak, in part because Klees supported Tory as party leader while Hudak refused.

After the 2011 general election Klees requested the post of deputy party leader, presently held by Whitby-Oshawa MPP Christine Elliott, but Tim Hudak instead offered the shadow cabinet role of transportation critic along with ethnic outreach in the PC party's shadow cabinet, which Klees turned down. On October 25, 2011, Klees announced that he would run for Speaker of the Legislative Assembly of Ontario, in defiance of the opposition party leaders who had earlier ordered their members not to contest the Speakership. The minority Liberal government was one seat short of forming a majority and if Klees had been elected Speaker, he would have given the government a working majority as the speaker usually votes with the government in motions of non-confidence. The move was met with derision from other Conservatives with one MPP saying, "This is the equivalent of crossing the floor... The Liberals better support him, because Frank doesn’t have a lot of friends in our caucus today." Klees withdrew his candidacy on October 29, 2011 due to lack of support.

He did not run in the 2014 election.

=== Cabinet positions ===
Eves ministry, Province of Ontario (2002–2003)
Cabinet posts (2)
Predecessor	Office	Successor
Norm Sterling	Minister of Transportation; 2003 (February–October)	Harinder Takhar
Cam Jackson	Minister of Tourism and Recreation; 2002–2003	Jim Bradley
Harris ministry, Province of Ontario (1995–2002)
Sub-Cabinet Post
Predecessor	Title	Successor
	Minister without Portfolio (1999–2001)	
Special Parliamentary Responsibilities
Predecessor	Title	Successor
David Turnbull	Chief Government Whip; 1999–2002	Doug Galt
