= Universal Energy Group =

Universal Energy Group, Ltd., abbreviated as UEG, is a Canadian energy company. It owns two subsidiaries, Universal Energy Corporation and ethanol producer Terra Grain Fuels. The company is publicly traded on the Toronto Stock Exchange under the symbol UEG. On December 11, 2008, UEG announced that it had acquired Commerce Energy.
