= University of Western Ontario Faculty of Education =

Coordinates: 42.9990°N 81.2782°W

- Former names: Ontario College of Education; Althouse College of Education
- Type: Faculty
- Established: 1962
- Affiliations: University of Western Ontario
- Dean: Donna Kotsopoulos
- Location: London, Ontario, Canada
- Website: www.edu.uwo.ca

The University of Western Ontario Faculty of Education, branded as Western Education since 2011, is the school of education of the University of Western Ontario in London, Ontario, Canada.

== History ==
Originally named the Ontario College of Education, the second secondary teacher training institution established in Ontario, it opened its doors in 1962. The south half of building served as the Department of Education for Ontario, staffing J. G. Althouse, its first Chief Director of Education (1944-1956) and also Dean of the College (1934-1944).

With great expansion over the years, the Department of Education moved out and on April 16, 1963 the building was renamed the Althouse College of Education. At this point the College remained only affiliated with the nearby University of Western Ontario. Turner served as Althouse College's Dean from 1965-1969. Its instruction staff consisted of a mix of veteran teacher faculty and PhD-level research faculty. The College contained over 14 different departments, many for the teachable subjects (math, history, art, etc.), but also curriculum, psychology, and philosophy. In 1973, London Teacher's College (Elborn) merged with Althouse College to form the Faculty of Education at the university. Elborn mostly held veteran teacher faculty, and while some were brought over to Althouse College, many were not. Joining the university as a Faculty of Education (1974) contributed to attrition of non-research-based faculty, influencing them to either upgrade to a PhD level or resign. During this period, the College began consolidating its many different departments. Stabler served as Dean for the London Teacher's College (1969–74), including the merging period to 1976. A graduate program was started later in the 1990s, the PhD program slowly growing with 6 students a year in 1999.

Early teacher education at Althouse required students to enrol in Philosophy, History, and Psychology as separate foundations courses. While the instructors of the last two did not mind adjusting their purist backgrounds in history and psychology toward the educational contexts and relevance to education (History of Education; Educational Psychology), the philosophers feared that students would not receive philosophy as it should be taught because of the applied nature of education. Therefore, they did not adapt their practice to a kind of Philosophy of Education, and remained teaching purist philosophy to teacher-candidates such as logic, epistemology, and the history of modern philosophy. The students were not encouraged by this and complained the content was not relevant to their daily practice as teachers.

In 1967-68, R. S. Peters, a well-known (analytical) philosopher of education from the London Institute visited Althouse College and spent several days lecturing and visiting with faculty and students. He helped change the instruction of philosophy to philosophy of education, offering several course outlines of philosophy of education courses taught at the University of London. The faculty at Althouse College also began experimenting with a new way of bringing philosophy to bear on educational practice - the teaching of philosophy of 'subjects,' e.g. philosophy of mathematics, philosophy of history, etc., but also philosophy of the elementary years for the elementary school teachers. This gave the teachers considerable foundations in the 'form of knowledge' they were tasked with instructing in the elementary and high schools, and gave them greater background in understanding their subjects to convey to their future students.

The next decade, from 1967-1977, was the golden age of philosophy of education at Althouse College. When the department of philosophers of education had a member retire, they were 'promptly replaced'. Funds were plentiful and many visiting scholars were brought to the faculty to lecture and confer with faculty and students.

In 1978, substantial funding issues were incurred. The philosophy of subjects method was cut and philosophy of education was consolidated and offered as a single required course in the teacher education program. Philosophy of Education faculty were also less and less replaced, their numbers diminishing. Eventually the Department of Philosophy was closed, their remaining faculty moved to the Administration and Policy Department.

In 1996, Paul O'Leary, a philosopher of education who had been in the faculty for 31 years, retired, leaving two philosophers of education to teach 600 students. This teaching load, especially when philosophy of education was typically taught not only with lectures in the auditorium, but also smaller seminars rooms for discussion, was 'unsustainable'.
