= Chris Hodgson =

Canadian politician

The Honourable Chris Hodgson ECO

Ontario MPP
- In office 1999–2003
- Preceded by: New riding
- Succeeded by: Laurie Scott
- Constituency: Haliburton—Victoria—Brock
- In office 1994–1999
- Preceded by: Dennis Drainville
- Succeeded by: Riding abolished
- Constituency: Victoria—Haliburton

Personal details
- Born: 1961 (age 64–65) Haliburton, Ontario, Canada
- Party: Progressive Conservative
- Relations: Ronald Glen Hodgson, uncle Louis Hodgson, uncle
- Occupation: President of the Ontario Mining Association

Chris Hodgson (born c. 1961) is a former politician in Ontario, Canada. He was Reeve of Dysart Township in 1993, and warden of Haliburton. He was a Progressive Conservative member of the Legislative Assembly of Ontario from 1994 to 2003 representing the ridings of Victoria—Haliburton and Haliburton—Victoria—Brock. He was a cabinet minister in the governments of Mike Harris and Ernie Eves, serving variously as Minister of Northern Development and Mines, Chair of the Management Board of Cabinet and Deputy Government House Leader, and Minister of Municipal Affairs and Housing.

== Background ==
Hodgson was born in Millbrook, Haliburton, Ontario, to the first Director of Education for Haliburton County, John Douglas Hodgson (1926-1997) and his wife Barbara Brintell. He graduated from Trent University in 1985 with a Bachelor of Arts honours degree in history and political science. He worked as a real-estate agent for RE/MAX and worked in health care planning for Haliburton County.

Hodgson's son, Cody, is a retired ice hockey player picked 10th overall by the Vancouver Canucks in the 2008 NHL entry draft who last played for the Nashville Predators of the National Hockey League in 2016. His uncle, Ronald Glen Hodgson, was a Tory MPP for many years, in the same riding later held by Chris Hodgson. His grandfather, Clayton Hodgson, also represented the riding federally from 1945 to 1963. Another uncle, Louis Hodgson, was also a PC MPP, representing the Toronto riding of Scarborough East for one term from 1963 to 1967.

== Political career ==
Hodgson was the Reeve of Dysart Township, winning 70% of the vote in his election, and warden of Haliburton County, prior to entering provincial politics.

Hodgson was elected to the Ontario legislature in a 1994 by-election with 50.9% of the vote, defeating Liberal candidate Sharon McCrae by fewer than 2,000 votes in the rural riding of Victoria—Haliburton. After the by-election, there were may accusations by the Liberal opposition and media that Hodgson's team appealed to homophobic prejudice in the region to put their candidate over the top. However, Hodgson's campaign prioritized the ongoing recession, and electoral analysis shows that he was elected on the basis of the positive response to his 5-point plan, focusing on cutting red tape and taxes, downsizing government, creating a good job climate, bringing deficits under control, and reforming education. Meanwhile, at the time of the by-election, the Liberal Party claimed to have unequivocally supported the NDP government's plans to provide increased social benefits for same-sex couples in Bill 167. In reality, the overwhelming majority of the Liberal caucus voted against the measure, and then opposition leader Lynn McLeod was accused of "flip-flopping" when she refused to support the NDP bill on the grounds of her opposition to same-sex adoption. Then Premier Bob Rae has also since been accused of using the same-sex benefits controversy as a wedge issue, “cynically cho[osing] not to whip his majority behind the bill because he saw an opportunity to blame its failure on McLeod's Liberals” and “was more interested in stopping the then-ascendant Liberals than in advancing the cause of equality.”

After the Tories won a majority government in the provincial election of 1995, Hodgson was re-elected over McCrae by almost 20,000 votes, with 67% of the vote. On June 26, 1995, he was named Minister of Natural Resources, Development and Mines in Mike Harris's government.

On October 10, 1997, Hodgson was named Minister of Northern Development and Mines, Chair of the Management Board of Cabinet and Deputy Government House Leader (holding the latter positions until 2001). He also served as Minister of Municipal Affairs and Housing from 2001 to 2003.

Hodgson defeated McCrae for a third time in the 1999 provincial election, this time in the redistributed riding of Haliburton—Victoria—Brock. He retained his position as Chair of the Management Board in the new parliament, and was also named Commissioner of the Board of Internal Economy on July 27, 1999. After a cabinet shuffle on February 8, 2001, he was named Minister of Municipal Affairs and Housing.

When Harris resigned as Premier in 2002, many expected Hodgson to enter the race to replace him. Instead, he endorsed Ernie Eves, the victorious candidate. He retained the Municipal Affairs and Housing portfolio in the Eves cabinet, but unexpectedly stepped down on January 13, 2003, announcing his decision to retire from politics. He did not run in the 2003 election. In 2004, he supported John Tory's successful bid to replace Eves as party leader.

=== Political achievements ===
As Minister of Natural Resources, Hodgson launched the Lands for Life initiative, which saw the largest increase in parks and protected space in the history of the province, and laid the groundwork for the government's Living Legacy program, the single biggest expansion of parks in Ontario. That year, he also reinstated the Managed Forest Tax Incentive Program, which promoted environmental stewardship and economic sustainability of private forestland. Hodgson also cooperated with hunters and animal rights activists to introduce the first amended Fish and Wildlife Conservation Act in 50 years, replacing the Game and Fish Act, in an effort to toughen enforcement provisions in the industry, increase protection of a wider range of species and better manage resources. Moreover, Hodgson brought together and collaborated with Ontario trappers to form the Ontario Fur Managers Federation for the management of wild fur resources. He also created the Special Purpose Account and the Fish and Wildlife Enhancement Fund and Advisory Boards to earmark funding to fish and wildlife parks, and set up an account dedicated to fishing and hunting license revenues for the Ontario Federation of Anglers and Hunters. He also introduced Bill 52 to make Aggregate Industry more accountable for meeting strict provincial standards and removing barriers to job creation in the sector.

As Minister, Hodgson also awarded private-sector contracts to assist firefighting and frontline health and medical services at large fire sites. He led the strategy to tackle the Land Caution in the Temagami area, resolving the long-standing dispute on land use and resource management, and was also singled out for bringing together all sides of the Kawartha Highlands Signature Site and brokering an agreement by writing new legislation to turn the 36,000-hectare Kawartha Highlands into a provincial park. He was recognized as the key figure in this process by the president of the World Wildlife Fund Canada.

As Minister of Northern Development, Hodgson promoted economic diversity and the creation of long-term jobs in the North as chair of the $210-million Northern Heritage Fund and the $77-million Special Circumstances Fund, and maintained the Ontario Prospectors Assistance Program. He also helped draft the first partnership between the province and a First Nations band to manage a provincial park (Serpent Mounds). He was also praised for targeting illegal gambling and rejuvenated the horse-racing industry by banning video lottery terminals from bars and restaurants, and proposing slot machines at racetracks, rejecting a proposal for private gambling houses in a bid to consolidate the administration of legal gaming under the jurisdiction of the Ontario Lottery Corporation. His efforts were recognized by the Ontario Horse Racing Industry Association and the Responsible Gaming Council.

As Minister of Municipal Affairs, he rewrote the Municipal Act for the first time since the passage of the Baldwin Act in the late 19th century, placed protective status on the Oak Ridges Moraine and began the Smart Growth Initiative for the entire province, a program that was later renamed Places to Grow. As Minister, in conjunction with his role as Chair of the Provincial and Territorial Ministers of Housing, Hodgson persuaded the federal government to flow housing funding across the country to meet the varying needs of different regions, resulting in the construction of over 10,500 new units of affordable housing in Ontario. Hodgson also oversaw the mandate of Bill 124, ‘An act to improve public safety and to increase efficiency in building code enforcement’ under BRRAG (Building Regulatory Reform Advisory Group), which received royal assent in June 2002, and introduced legislation to help revitalize contaminated industrial sites.

In 2002, Hodgson was also responsible for Ontario's role in hosting World Youth Day, then the largest international conference held in Canada, which generated an estimated $233 million in economic spinoffs.

=== Ipperwash Inquiry ===
Shortly after assuming office, Hodgson was involved in a cabinet discussion with Harris and members of the Ontario Provincial Police concerning a standoff with native protesters at Ipperwash Provincial Park. The police cleared the park by force on September 6, 1995, and in the process killed an unarmed protester named Dudley George.

The Ipperwash Inquiry into the Ipperwash shooting was established by the Liberal government of Dalton McGuinty in 2004. In late 2005, former deputy Solicitor-General Elaine Todres testified that she heard Hodgson say, "Get the fucking Indians out of my park" at a lunch-hour meeting on the day of Dudley George's shooting. Former Attorney General Charles Harnick had previously testified that he heard Premier Harris say "I want the fucking Indians out of the park" at the same meeting. Harris and Hodgson both denied the allegations when they took the stand, and Deputy Minister Ron Vrancart testified against Todres’ claims that Hodgson was angry or agitated at the meeting. He stated that the only thing Hodgson spoke about at the meeting was that the matter had nothing to do with his ministry, and as such, he should not be the spokesperson for it. Ultimately, the Report of the Ipperwash Inquiry attributed the remark to Harris. Hodgson later stated that although he was glad that the Inquiry was providing an opportunity for healing among the First Nations community, the inquiry had become a ‘show trial’ of the former Conservative government. He is quoted having said that he not only did not say those words (“If I had said it, I would have said I said it”), but stayed quiet during the meeting because he felt the issue had nothing to do with his ministry, as it was an enforcement issue.

=== Cabinet positions ===
Harris ministry, Province of Ontario (1995–2002)
Cabinet posts (4)
Predecessor	Office	Successor
Tony Clement	Ministry of Municipal Affairs and Housing (Note: Ernie Eves retained Hodgson in his cabinet when he took power in 2002.); 2001–2003	Helen Johns
Dave Johnson	Chair of the Management Board of Cabinet; 1997–2001	David Tsubouchi
Shelley Martel	Minister of Northern Development and Mines; 1995–1999	Tim Hudak
Howard Hampton	Minister of Natural Resources; 1995–1999	John Snobelen

== Awards ==
Hodgson's work on the Oak Ridges Moraine was recognized by the Environmental Commissioner with the 2001-2002 ECO Award. Hodgson and his ministry were also awarded the 2001 Canadian Urban Institute Brownie Award for leadership in policy development for Ontario's Brownfields Statute Law Amendment Act, 2001.

In 2003, the Chamber of Commerce named Hodgson Highlander of the Year for his service to Haliburton county.

He became the first MPP to have been awarded the AMO (Association of Municipalities of Ontario) award (2003). Hodgson became the first politician to win the OFAH's Ontario Hunting Heritage Award (2003).

== After politics ==
Following his retirement from politics, Hodgson has sat on a number of public and private boards, including the EACOM Timber Corp., Mineral Streams Inc., and the Brick Income Trust Ltd. Hodgson is currently president of the Ontario Mining Association, the provincial mining industry's trade organization.
