= Realtors Association of Hamilton-Burlington =

The REALTORS Association of Hamilton-Burlington (RAHB) is the 3rd largest real estate board in Ontario and the 8th largest in Canada, representing over 2900 members in Hamilton, Burlington and surrounding areas.

In the community, RAHB is the largest fundraiser to the CHML/Y108 Children's Fund, a founding member of the Home Ownership Affordability Partnership (in conjunction with the City of Hamilton and the Threshold School of Building), and administrator of the Karan Barker Memorial Scholarship. In November 2006, RAHB grabbed national headlines for its pledge to send Tim Hortons gift certificates to Canadian troops stationed in Kandahar, Afghanistan.

Officially founded in 1921, the REALTORS Association of Hamilton-Burlington was previously:

- the Hamilton Real Estate Board
- the Metropolitan Hamilton Real Estate Board
- the Hamilton-Burlington District Real Estate Board

The Association's landmark building on York Boulevard, was acquired in 1990 for $3.8M.

== History ==
- 1874 - Hamilton Real Estate Association formed - a precursor to organized real estate in Hamilton
- 1921 - Hamilton Real Estate Board founded
- 1949 - first real estate group in Ontario to introduce the Multiple Listing Service
- 1951 - first Photo Co-op System (predecessor to modern day MLS) in Canada

== See also ==
- Canadian Real Estate Association
- Ontario Real Estate Association
