= Common Sense Revolution =

Political slogan used to describe some conservative platforms

The phrase Common Sense Revolution (CSR) has been used as a political slogan to describe conservative platforms with a main goal of reducing taxes while balancing the budget by reducing the size and role of government. It has been used in places such as Australia and Canada. This article deals with the "Common Sense Revolution" as it was under Ontario Premier Mike Harris and the Progressive Conservative Party of Ontario from 1995 to 2002.

== Origin ==
From 1943 to 1985, the Progressive Conservative Party (PC) held uninterrupted power in Ontario, under Red Tory premiers such as Leslie Frost, John Robarts, and Bill Davis. In 1985, this era of Conservative Premiers (termed the Big Blue Machine by observers) came to an end when the minority government of Davis' successor, Frank Miller, was defeated in the legislature and in the subsequent provincial election when the Ontario Liberal Party formed a minority government and the Liberal leader, David Peterson, was sworn in as premier. The PC party was again defeated in the 1987 election that gave Peterson a majority government.

In 1990, a junior cabinet minister from Miller's former government, Mike Harris, won the leadership of the party which was widely interpreted as a move to the political right, as Harris defeated the more centrist Dianne Cunningham. Harris immediately set about crafting a new image for himself and the party. In his first election in 1990, he branded himself "the tax fighter". He strongly opposed an unpopular photo-radar program introduced by the Liberal government and attacked it as a revenue grab. Despite his party's third place showing in the election (which was won by NDP leader Bob Rae), Harris had managed to improve the party standing in the legislature and bring some attention to his plan. After the 1990 election, Harris and his advisors (including prominent Ontario Tories Tony Clement, then President of the party, Leslie Noble, Alister Campbell and Tom Long) set to work creating a more comprehensive reform package to present to the province. The result was the CSR.

== Content ==
The CSR reform package was markedly neoliberal in nature, closely mirroring the platforms of British Prime Minister Margaret Thatcher and U.S. President Ronald Reagan during the 1980s.

The central tenets of the CSR were tax reduction, balancing the budget, reducing the size and role of government, and an emphasis on individual economic responsibility (often summarized by opposition to government hand-outs). Among other things, Harris promised to reduce personal income tax rates by 30% and balance the provincial budget at the same time (which had reached a record $10 billion deficit under the NDP).

The CSR was specifically tailored as a reform document. It was presented as a radical change to the status quo of provincial government business. The opening words of the document were: "The people of Ontario have a message for their politicians — government isn't working anymore. The system is broken."

== 1995 Ontario general election and its impact ==
When Bob Rae called the 1995 general election in Ontario, most political commentators were sure that Liberal leader Lyn McLeod would end up taking the premier's job. However, this prediction proved rather premature.

Sticking to the contents of the CSR, Harris fought a campaign focused on simple, easily communicated messages. Specifically, he consistently delivered the party's promises to lower taxes and reduce the number of people on Ontario's social assistance program. The turning point in the election is often considered to be Harris' performance in the televised leader's debate. Rather than get caught up in the debate between McLeod and Rae, Harris used his camera time to speak directly to the camera to convey CSR points, virtually ignoring all questions asked of him by his opponents. Another major contributing factor was a focussed advertising campaign which stuck to 3 key policy elements - "Work for Welfare, Scrap the Quota Law (Affirmative Action) and Tax Cuts for Jobs — Common Sense for a Change". Harris and the PCs won a majority government in the election, winning 82 of the province's 130 seats.

Harris was committed to implementing the CSR platform almost in its entirety. Over several years, income taxes were cut as much as 30%. Spending cuts in "low priority areas" reduced government spending in all areas except for health care, where government spending rose each year the PCs were in office (from $17.6B in 1994/95 to $27.6B in 2003/04). Welfare reforms (including reductions in welfare payments to 'able-bodied citizens' through the division of the former Welfare program into the Ontario Disability Support Program and the Workfare program, which required able-bodied citizens to work for support) contributed to a reduction of welfare consumption in Ontario. With economic growth in North America generally strong, Ontario over the next five years outperformed every Canadian province except Alberta. This growth allowed Harris to eliminate briefly the $11 billion annual deficit he had inherited from previous Premiers David Peterson and Bob Rae. Although the provincial budget was indeed balanced for the last several years of Harris's own time in office, his successor and former deputy Ernie Eves left office with a $5 billion deficit.

== Bill 103 ==
Harris' interest in reforming the political structure of cities dated back to his time in opposition when he led the "Mike Harris Task Force on Bringing Common Sense to Metro" (Toronto), on January 5, 1995. This in many ways was designed to counter Premier Bob Rae's government task force on the Greater Toronto Area, chaired by Anne Golden. When the final report (called the "Golden Report") was released in 1996, it called for a GTA-tier of local government and for inter-municipal service agencies (based on a similar model to that of Metro Toronto government).

The net effect of the Golden Report was that it countered the Mike Harris pledge of "less government". The creation of a larger organizing body for the region ran counter to his party's advocacy of smaller government. Harris had felt that politicians, in particular lower level city councillors, were problematic to his party, and prevented free enterprise. The plan for reduced government might have emulated Margaret Thatcher's approach that eliminated democratically elected upper-tier city and metropolitan region governments, replacing them with a collection of more politically amenable appointed special-purpose bodies dominated by patronage. See Greater London Council.

While many suburban municipalities grew rapidly during Harris' first term (1995–1999), some, such as Opposition member Bud Wildman, have argued that the net effect of many CSR policies was to transfer wealth from urban to suburban areas and to refocus services to commuters and suburbs. In a highly controversial move, the City of Toronto was merged with the five surrounding cities of Metropolitan Toronto to form a new single-tier "megacity" (a term coined by the local media). The Harris government saw the megacity as a cost-cutting measure. The fact that the merger took place in Toronto, a region with a lower proportion Conservative MPPs, further polarized the debate on the merit of the merger. Some municipalities, particularly Toronto, also complained that the government was "downloading" the costs of services that the province had formerly paid for onto local city and municipal governments.

Long before the merger, in October 1996, a focus group conducted by Angus Reid for the government warned Municipal Affairs Minister Al Leach that there would be "considerable public resistance" to the creation of a unified Toronto. Leach would go on to blame local mayors and community groups for the opposition, going on to be quoted in the same article as saying: "In the end, it became a cause célèbre for all of the issues that the government was bringing forward on its agenda".

One of the loudest opponents to the new city was former Toronto mayor John Sewell who led the action group Citizens for Local Democracy.

In April 1997, the government introduced Bill 103 (City of Toronto Act). The Ontario New Democratic Party filibustered the legislation by proposing a series of amendments, each of which required the government to consult the residents of a specific street in the city before implementing the amalgamation. One street, Cafon Court in Etobicoke, had its amendment successfully passed when government members inadvertently let one of the NDP amendments pass, although the Tories later voted to strike the Cafon amendment.

The round-the-clock fight at Queen's Park lasted 10 days before the legislation was finally passed on April 21. On January 1, 1998, the new single-tier City of Toronto came into existence, superseding the former two-tier structure of Metropolitan Toronto, and the constituent cities of Toronto, York, North York, Etobicoke, Scarborough and the Borough of East York.

Other controversial municipal amalgamations took place during Harris' second term, including in Ottawa, Hamilton, Greater Sudbury and Kawartha Lakes. Unlike the Toronto amalgamation, however, these all involved large rural areas in addition to the primary urban core. Controversy over the amalgamations remains a significant political issue in some of these cities.

== Successor ==
Attempting to build on the success of the CSR content and messaging strategy for the 1999 election, Harris and the Ontario Tories branded their new policy document the "Blueprint" (Blue being the official colour of the party). The Blueprint followed the same theoretical framework as its predecessor, yet was tempered for a much different political environment. In 1995 the message had been "reform" and "revolution", but after four years of conservative government, the message became a balance between stability and emphasizing that there was still "much left to do". Though not as popular as the CSR, the Blueprint was part of a successful re-election campaign, allowing Harris to win another majority government.

Harris resigned as premier in 2002, and was succeeded by Ernie Eves. Through a variety of factors, including dissatisfaction with the effects of the government's platform policies, deterioration of municipal services after downloading, the Walkerton Tragedy during the CSR, and Eves' handling of the Northeast Blackout, the Progressive Conservatives were defeated in the 2003 provincial election by Dalton McGuinty and the Ontario Liberal Party.

== Legacy ==
Municipal amalgamation led to a reduction in the number of municipalities in Ontario from 850 to 443 and the number of elected municipal officials by 23%, but resulted in an increase in the number of municipal employees by 39% from 1996 to 2011. Per thousand residents, there were 15.8 municipal employees in 1990 and 20.9 in 2010. Part of this resulted from an increase in services by the larger municipalities, or replacement of volunteer staff with full-time staff such as for firefighting services. Other contributing factors were the downloading of services from provincial jurisdiction to municipalities, such as social assistance, public housing and public health. The remaining increase resulted from wage increases associated with amalgamation and an increase in administrative employment, such as hiring more clerks and treasurers. Amalgamated municipalities increased employees at twice the rate of those that were not restructured.
