= Dianne Cunningham =

Canadian politician

The Honourable Dianne Cunningham ECO

Ontario MPP
- In office 1999–2003
- Preceded by: New riding
- Succeeded by: Deb Matthews
- Constituency: London North Centre
- In office 1988–1999
- Preceded by: Ron Van Horne
- Succeeded by: Riding abolished
- Constituency: London North

Personal details
- Born: December 5, 1939 (age 86) Toronto, Ontario, Canada
- Party: Progressive Conservative
- Occupation: Teacher

Dianne Esther Cunningham OOnt (born December 5, 1939) is a former politician in Ontario, Canada. She was a Progressive Conservative member of the Legislative Assembly of Ontario from 1988 to 2003, and a cabinet minister in the governments of Mike Harris and Ernie Eves.

== Background ==
Cunningham worked as an elementary school teacher in private life, and entered politics by winning a seat on the London, Ontario school board in 1973. She retained that position for fifteen years, and also served as a Planning Officer for the Ontario Ministry of Community and Social Services.

== Politics ==
Cunningham was elected to the Ontario legislature for the riding of London North in a 1988 by-election. The riding had previously been Liberal, and bordered on the seat belonging to Liberal Premier David Peterson; Cunningham's victory made her a rising star in the small Tory caucus. She ran for the leadership of the then third-place Conservatives in 1990, losing to Mike Harris in the party's first one member, one vote election for leader. She was considered a Red Tory, but was hurt by comparisons to Brian Mulroney, Canada's unpopular Progressive Conservative Prime Minister. Her loss to Harris led to a major shift in the political orientation of the party.

Cunningham was re-elected in the 1990 provincial election, which was won by the New Democratic Party. During the next five years, the Tories developed a series of right-wing policy initiatives which became known as the "Common Sense Revolution". Cunningham was not a major contributor to this process. She did, however, serve as her party's Deputy Leader and Caucus Whip from 1990 to 1995.

She was easily re-elected in the 1995 provincial election, which the Tories won. While not in the Harris government's inner circle, she was appointed to cabinet in the minor portfolios of Minister of Intergovernmental Affairs and Minister responsible for Women's Issues. She retained these positions throughout the Harris government's first term. In 1998, she supported Hugh Segal for the leadership of the Progressive Conservative Party of Canada.

In the provincial election of 1999, Cunningham narrowly defeated New Democratic Party Member of Provincial Parliament (MPP) Marion Boyd in the redistributed riding of London North Centre (the Harris government had previously reduced the number of provincial ridings from 130 to 103, forcing many MPPs to run against one another). Following the election, she was promoted to Minister of Training, Colleges and Universities, and retained that portfolio for the next four years. She was also re-appointed as Minister responsible for Women's Issues on February 8, 2001. In 2002, she supported Ernie Eves to replace Mike Harris as party leader.

Shortly after the 1995 election, she introduced a private member's bill requiring cyclists aged 18 and under to wear helmets. This law has been in effect in Ontario since that time.

Cunningham was often criticized for the way her department managed the elimination of OAC levels from Ontario's high-school system. The decision reduced the standard high-school honours degree program from five years to four, and resulted in a "double cohort" of new university students when the policy first came into effect. University entrance marks were raised to what some considered high levels; for example, the University of Western Ontario raised their entrance cutoff to an 80% average. Because of this, many students were unable to attend the university of their choice, and poor departmental planning was frequently blamed.

As Minister she oversaw some significant changes to the structure and governance of Ontario's postsecondary system. This included the Post-Secondary Choice and Excellence Act, 2000, which created a framework for the expansion of private universities and degree-granting options for colleges of applied arts and technology in Ontario. She was also responsible for the first major update to the legislation governing Ontario's colleges of applied arts and technology, referenced at the time as "a new charter for colleges", with the introduction of the Ontario Colleges of Applied Arts and Technology Act, 2002.

She ran for re-election in the 2003 election, but lost to Deb Matthews by over 6,000 votes in the landslide victory that brought the Ontario Liberal Party to power.

=== Cabinet posts ===
Harris ministry, Province of Ontario (1995–2002)
Cabinet posts (3)
Predecessor	Office	Successor
New ministry	Minister of Training, Colleges and Universities; 1999–2003	Mary Anne Chambers
Marion Boyd	Minister Responsible for Women's Issues; 1995–2003	Sandra Pupatello
Bob Rae	Minister of Intergovernmental Affairs; 1995–1999	Ernie Eves

== Later life ==
After the election, she was appointed Director of the Lawrence National Centre for Policy and Management.
