= 2002 Progressive Conservative Party of Ontario leadership election =

Canadian political party leadership election

- Date: March 23, 2002
- Convention: Metro Toronto Convention Centre, Toronto, Ontario
- Resigning leader: Mike Harris
- Won by: Ernie Eves
- Ballots: 2
- Candidates: 5
- Entrance fee: ?
- Spending limit: ?

The 2002 Ontario Progressive Conservative leadership election was a leadership election called in the fall of 2001 when Ontario Progressive Conservative Party Premier Mike Harris announced his intention to resign.

The candidates to succeed Harris were Elizabeth Witmer, Tony Clement, Ernie Eves, Jim Flaherty and Chris Stockwell. Eves was not initially a candidate, but was persuaded to join the race by senior Tories who felt none of the other candidates could win a provincial election.

Witmer and Eves sought to distance the party from Harris's "Common Sense Revolution" agenda. Eves began his campaign with a speech in which he said he was neither left wing nor right wing. He later said that the government should not be giving tax credits to parents who send their children to private schools unless the schools teach the government curriculum. These tax credits had been introduced by Flaherty as Minister of Finance. These and other comments led Harris loyalist Jim Flaherty to launch a number of publicity stunts against Eves, whose de facto rejection of the Common Sense Revolution had made him the early front-runner. Flaherty referred to Eves as a "serial waffler" and as "a pale-pink imitation of Dalton McGuinty." Eves was dogged on the campaign trail by a pink waffle and a pink panther, courtesy of the Flaherty campaign. Flaherty, for his part, caught flack in the media for proposing to take the homeless off the streets by force on cold winter nights. During the campaign, Clement effectively blamed Flaherty for bringing to the fore news about Clement's wife, a lawyer, who was alleged to take a pro-choice view of abortion. Eves - who had the backing of almost all PC Members of Provincial Parliament (MPPs) - won the campaign.

For the vote a modified "One Member One Vote" system was used in which all ridings in the province were accorded 100 points which were distributed among the candidate in proportion to the number of votes each received in that riding. If no candidate won a majority on the first ballot, a second ballot would be held later the same day with balloting continuing until one candidate had a majority.

The vote was held on March 23, 2002.

The results of the first ballot were:

First ballot:

- Ernie Eves 4,257 points (41.3%)
- Jim Flaherty 3,031 points (29%)
- Tony Clement 1,354 points (13.2%)
- Elizabeth Witmer 1,197 points (11.6%)
- Chris Stockwell 448 points (4%)

Stockwell, having the fewest votes, was forced to withdraw. Clement and Witmer announced their withdrawal to support Eves, however, their announcement came too late to remove their names from the ballot.

Second ballot:

- Ernie Eves 5,623 points (54.6%)
- Jim Flaherty 3,898 points (37.8%)
- Tony Clement 561 points (5.4%)
- Elizabeth Witmer 216 points (2.1%)

(44,188 party members voted on the first ballot, 34,608 on the second.)

One problem with the procedure was that voters were expected to remain in voting centres throughout the province for hours if they wanted to cast ballots in both rounds of voting. Many did not wish to do so, or could not do so, and left after casting their first ballot vote. As a result, in the 2004 PC leadership election, voters voted only once using a preferential ballot, in which they ranked the candidates by preference, rather than vote in separate rounds.

== See also ==
- Progressive Conservative Party of Ontario leadership elections
- 1985 Progressive Conservative Party of Ontario leadership elections
- 2004 Progressive Conservative Party of Ontario leadership election
