= 2004 Progressive Conservative Party of Ontario leadership election =

- September 18, 2004
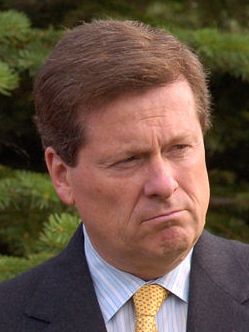

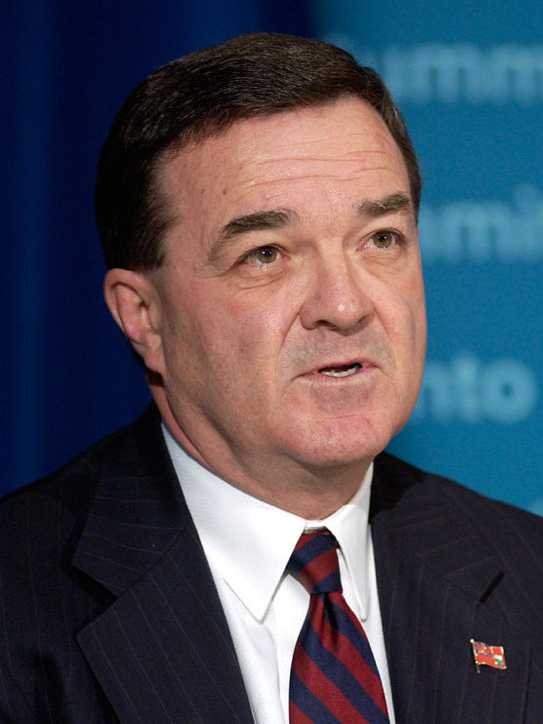
			FK
Candidate	John Tory	Jim Flaherty	Frank Klees
Riding	N/A	Whitby—Ajax	Oak Ridges
Final ballot points	5,390.86 (53.61%)	4,664.14 (46.39%)	Eliminated
Final ballot votes	18,037 (55.69%)	14,353 (44.31%)	Eliminated
First ballot points	4,535.13 (45.01%)	3,274.92 (32.50%)	2,265.96 (22.49%)
First ballot votes	12,132 (47.91%)	7,951 (31.40%)	5,240 (20.69%)
Previous leader
Ernie Eves
Elected leader
John Tory

2004 Progressive Conservative Party of Ontario leadership election
- Date: September 18, 2004
- Convention: Crowne Plaza Toronto Don Valley, Toronto, Ontario
- Resigning leader: Ernie Eves
- Won by: John Tory
- Ballots: 2
- Candidates: 3
- Entrance fee: ?
- Spending limit: $1 million

On January 23, 2004, the Progressive Conservative Party of Ontario leader Ernie Eves announced his intention to step down as leader before the fall of 2004. Eves was elected party leader in the party's 2002 leadership election, and became Premier of Ontario. He led the party to defeat in the 2003 provincial election.

Under the Ontario PC Party Constitution, a leadership election could not be called until Eves submitted a formal request to the Party Executive. He did not do so until June, and a few days later, on June 13, the Party Executive called a leadership election for September 18, 2004. The leadership vote was won by John Tory with approximately 54% of the vote on the second ballot.

== Candidates ==
- Jim Flaherty was the provincial Minister of Finance under Mike Harris, and Eves' Minister of Enterprise, Opportunity and Innovation. He was the runner-up to Eves in the 2002 leadership election. Flaherty was a social conservative, whose 2002 campaign focused on law and order and neo-conservative wedge issues.
- Frank Klees was the Chief Government Whip in the Harris government, and Minister of Tourism and of Transportation in the Eves government. His campaign criticized the Harris-Eves government for its reliance on unelected advisors, and promised to return the party to the grassroots. He also argued for health care reform, particularly the introduction of private health care for those who can afford it.
- John Tory, a centrist, Red Tory ideologically, was principal secretary to Bill Davis, who was Premier of Ontario from 1971 to 1985. Tory had been the CEO of Rogers Cablesystems. He ran a strong campaign for Mayor of Toronto in the 2003 civic election. His campaign leaned more to the political centre and appealed to Red Tories.

== Possible candidates who did not run ==
- Elizabeth Witmer has been a Waterloo, Ontario Member of Provincial Parliament (MPP) since 1990. She served as Minister of Health and then Minister of the Environment under Mike Harris, and Minister of Education and Deputy Premier under Ernie Eves. Witmer was a candidate in the 2002 race that selected Eves. She had considered running in the 2004 race, but decided to endorse John Tory instead.
- John Baird, MPP for Nepean since 1995, was mentioned as a possible candidate, but decided to support Jim Flaherty.
- Cam Jackson, a Tory MPP since 1985 from Burlington, Ontario and variously Minister of Tourism, Citizenship and Seniors in the Harris and Eves governments, was rumoured to be considering a run, but decided to endorse John Tory.

== Debates ==
The first of three candidates' debates occurred in Ottawa on July 26. The second debate occurred in Sudbury on August 17. The final debate was held in London, Ontario on August 30. While the third debate was a restrained affair the first two were marked by clashes between Flaherty and Tory as Flaherty accused his rival of not being a real conservative and being out of touch and elitist.

Final candidate speeches were made at the convention in Toronto on September 17. Flaherty made the unusual decision to deliver his speech in his home town of Whitby and have it broadcast live to the convention. This was criticized as being "gimmicky" and reminiscent of the disastrous Magna budget and as demonstrating a hostility to Toronto. The criticisms of Flaherty's decision overshadowed the contents of his speech.

== Issues ==
Flaherty's campaign was strongly critical of outgoing leader Ernie Eves accusing him of abandoning the "Common Sense Revolution" and arguing for a return to the policies of Mike Harris. A social conservative, Flaherty was perceived to be in favour of taking the party into a more right wing direction on social issues but said little of this during the actual campaign. John Tory's campaign hearkened back to the party's success under Bill Davis and argued that Ontarians were tired of divisiveness and polarization and that a more moderate direction was needed if the party was to succeed.

Tory, a former candidate for Mayor of Toronto, also emphasised the importance of urban issues and appealing to residents of Ontario's largest city which had shut the Tories out in the 2003 provincial election. He also argued against the privatization of crown corporations such as the Liquor Control Board of Ontario, which had been advocated by his rivals. Klees ran as a grassroots candidate, arguing that the party had been the captive of unelected backroom consultants during the Harris and Eves years and had cut off not only party members but backbench MPPs.

Klees ran as a defender of the Common Sense Revolution but, unlike Flaherty, was not seen as a social conservative. He was the only candidate to argue in favour of "two tier" health care and privatization within medicare.

== Process ==
The Ontario Progressive Conservatives use a system similar to that used by the federal Conservative Party of Canada in its leadership election. Each provincial riding association has up to 100 Electoral Votes that will be allocated among the candidates by proportional representation according to the votes cast by party members within the riding. This is not a pure "one member one vote" system since each riding generally has equal weight. (Ridings with fewer than 100 voting party members are allocated one Electoral Vote per voting member; ridings with 100 or more voting party members are allocated 100 Electoral Votes.)

This system is designed to favour candidates who can win support across the province and win in a majority of ridings. This replicates what is necessary for a party to win a general election - though without the "first past the post" feature of elections under the Westminster system. The party will use a preferential ballot on which voters rank their choices. If no candidate wins a majority of Electoral Votes, then the third-place candidate is eliminated, and his votes are redistributed according to second-choice rankings.

Members could only vote in person on September 18, or at the September 13 advance poll, or by proxy. Mail-in, phone-in and Internet voting are not permitted. Only party members in good standing as of 6:00 p.m., EDT, August 7, 2004, were eligible to vote. According to the party, there were 61,104 eligible voters, only 25,323 of whom cast ballots for a turnout of 41.4%.

Party president Blair McCreadie announced that candidates would be under a spending cap of $1 million, which is less than the $1.5 million permitted in the last leadership contest.

The leadership election was administered by an impartial Leadership Election Committee chaired by McCreadie and co-chaired by MPP Julia Munro. The Chief Election Officer was Tom Barlow. There were four Deputy Chief Election Officers: Janet Carwardine, Barbara Cowieson, Murna Dalton and Allan Williams.

== Result ==
Voting took place from 9 am to 2 pm. The first ballot results were announced shortly after 8 pm. The second ballot results were announced shortly after 11:30 pm.

=== First Ballot ===
- TORY, John, (12,132 votes) 4,535.13 electoral votes (45%)
- FLAHERTY, Jim, (7,951 votes) 3,274.92 electoral votes (33%)
- KLEES, Frank, (5,240 votes) 2,265.96 electoral votes (22%)

5,039 electoral votes needed to win

=== Second Ballot ===
- TORY, John (18,037 votes) 5,390.86 electoral votes (54%)
- FLAHERTY, Jim (14,353 votes) 4,664.14 electoral votes (46%)

5,028 electoral votes needed to win

== See also ==
- Progressive Conservative Party of Ontario leadership elections
- 1985 Progressive Conservative Party of Ontario leadership elections
- 2002 Progressive Conservative Party of Ontario leadership election
