= Donna Skelly =

Canadian politician (born 1961)

The Honourable Donna Skelly MPP
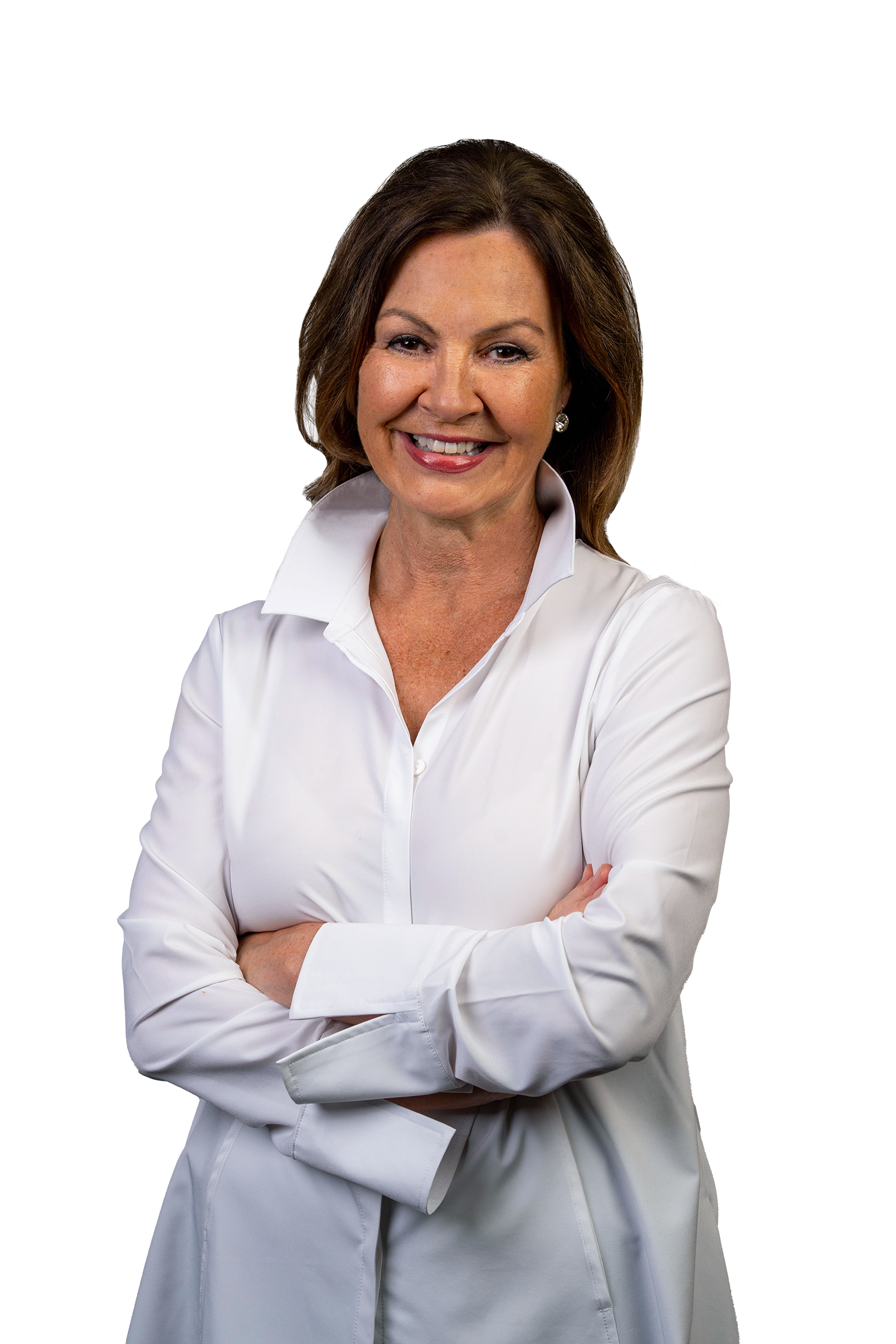
- Skelly in 2025

43rd Speaker of the Legislative Assembly of Ontario
- Incumbent
- Assumed office April 14, 2025
- Preceded by: Ted Arnott

Parliamentary Assistant to the Minister of Economic Development, Job Creation and Trade
- In office June 29, 2018 – October 21, 2021
- Minister: Vic Fedeli
- Succeeded by: Jeff Yurek

Member of the Ontario Provincial Parliament for Flamborough—Glanbrook
- Incumbent
- Assumed office June 28, 2018
- Preceded by: Riding established

Deputy Speaker of the Legislative Assembly of Ontario
- In office August 23, 2022 – April 14, 2025

Parliamentary Assistant to the Attorney General
- In office October 21, 2021 – April 14, 2025
- Minister: Doug Downey
- Preceded by: Lindsey Park

Hamilton City Councillor
- In office March 22, 2016 – June 27, 2018
- Preceded by: Scott Duvall
- Succeeded by: Terry Anderson (Appointed)

Personal details
- Born: October 23, 1961 (age 64) Sudbury, Ontario, Canada
- Party: Progressive Conservative
- Spouse: Rino Pirro-divorced
- Children: 2
- Education: Seneca College
- Occupation: Politician; journalist

Donna Skelly is a Canadian politician and former journalist who has been the 43rd speaker of the Legislative Assembly of Ontario since 2025. A member of the Ontario Progressive Conservative (PC) Party, Skelly has been the member of Provincial Parliament (MPP) for Flamborough—Glanbrook since 2018. She is the first woman to serve as the speaker in Ontario.

Prior to entering politics, Skelly worked as a journalist with CHCH-TV in Hamilton, anchoring and producing local and regional television newscasts. Skelly took a leave of absence from CHCH in 2011 to launch the first of two bids for provincial parliament with the Progressive Conservatives in Ancaster—Dundas—Flamborough—Westdale. In 2016, Skelly won a by-election to Hamilton City Council. She resigned from council after being elected to the legislature in the 2018 Ontario general election. In 2023, Skelly was appointed to the Executive Committee of the Commonwealth Parliamentary Association.

== Early life and media career ==
Skelly was born in Northern Ontario and graduated from the journalism program at Seneca College.

Skelly began her broadcast journalism career at CHIP-FM in Fort Coulonge, Quebec. She then moved on to CHRO-TV in Pembroke, Ontario, CKWS Radio/TV in Kingston before joining CHCH in 1988.

In 1992, Skelly began co-hosting the "Golden Horseshoe Report" on CHCH as part of a "revamp" of the station's evening news broadcast. The station, which had been purchased by British Columbia-based Western International Communications in 1990, further adapted CHCH's evening news broadcast in 1993, assigning Skelly to a national newscast, Canada Tonight, co-produced with the channel's then-sister station CHAN in Vancouver and co-anchored with Tony Parsons.

In 2000, Skelly resigned from CHCH, at the time rebranded as "ONtv", to start a local news and information website called "news4hamilton.com". Working from office space in the studios of local cable community channel Cable14, news4hamilton.com entered the growing online news market, with Skelly telling a local reporter that she wanted the site to grow into a "legitimate organization to compete in the marketplace." The internet venture later stopped publishing and, after holding a contract teaching position at Mohawk College, Skelly returned to CHCH in 2002 following the station's purchase by Global TV parent company Canwest.

Following her return to the station, Skelly became the chair of the CHCH employees union, the Communications, Energy and Paperworkers Local 1100. After Canwest announced plans to sell or close CHCH in 2009, Skelly launched a campaign to create a community-led corporation that would take over the station. The plan, backed by the station's employees, would have sought an independent licence to operate and secure support from local businesses, media workers, and advertisers to stay on the air. This plan was unable to proceed when Canwest announced the sale of CHCH to Toronto-based media group Channel Zero.

In 2010, Skelly was awarded local YWCA's Women of Distinction Award for her role in Hamilton's politics and public affairs. Skelly was one of 12 local women honoured during that year's Women of Distinction Awards, including Skelly's future fellow MPP, Sandy Shaw.

After CHCH filed for bankruptcy in 2015, Skelly was let go by the company during their restructuring.

== Politics ==
=== Early political career ===
After the death of Hamilton East MPP Dominic Agostino in 2004, Skelly was one of two local journalists thought to have been approached by the provincial Liberals to run in the electoral district's by-election. After her former CHCH colleague Jennifer Mossop was elected in the electoral district of Stoney Creek in 2003, both Skelly and then-radio broadcaster Bob Bratina were both rumoured to be possible candidates in Hamilton East. Despite the speculation, Skelly ruled out a run at the time.

In early 2011, Skelly was approached by the Ontario Progressive Conservatives to seek their nomination in the electoral district of Ancaster—Dundas—Flamborough—Westdale. Speaking with a reporter in February 2011, Skelly indicated she had not made a decision, but would consult with local political figures and consider her options. At the time, retired army officer Chris Corrigan, who had been the party's candidate in the electoral district in 2007, was the only registered candidate for the party's nomination. On March 28, at a media event in downtown Dundas, Skelly was announced as the party's candidate by PC leader Tim Hudak. The Hamilton Spectator reported that Corrigan was informed by the party to abandon his campaign in favour of Skelly. Despite the resignation of members of the local PC riding association over the party's handling of the nomination, Skelly was acclaimed as the PC candidate and faced veteran MPP Ted McMeekin in the October election. Skelly was defeated by McMeekin.

Shortly after the 2011 election, Skelly indicated her interest in running in the electoral district again. Opting for an open nomination race, the local Progressive Conservatives held an election between Skelly and local resident Nick Lauwers. Lauwers was backed by Corrigan while Skelly earned the endorsement of former MPP Toni Skarica. Skelly was nominated as the PC candidate in September 2012, beating Lauwers 194 to 166 votes in the nomination race. Skelly was nominated as the PC candidate in September 2012. In the lead-up to the campaign, Skelly hosted a fundraiser with prominent NHL players Darcy Tucker, Wendel Clark, and Dennis Hull. In the June election, Skelly was once again defeated by McMeekin.

=== Municipal politics ===
While still a candidate for provincial parliament, Skelly was rumoured to be considering a bid for Mayor of Hamilton in the city's 2014 municipal election. In March, Skelly confirmed she was not seeking the mayor's office, opting instead to campaign full-time for MPP.

After long-time Ward 7 Hamilton city councillor Scott Duvall was elected to parliament in 2015, a by-election was held to fill the vacant seat. Skelly joined the race shortly after and won over 22 other candidates. Speaking to local reporters after she won, Skelly indicated she wanted to bring artists to Concession Street, cut red tape at city hall, and champion taxpayers. After her victory, she told reporters she had no intentions of seeking higher office after her by-election win and that she was "not afraid to be politically incorrect and I will say what I believe."

During her first year on council, Skelly opposed Mayor Fred Eisenberger's proposed $50 million investment in social housing and poverty reduction due to a lack of detail in the proposed plan. Skelly also opposed the city's LRT project, and adjusting the city's ward boundaries in response to population increases. Skelly supported a motion by then-councillor Matthew Green to study a move to ranked ballots for Hamilton's municipal elections.

In 2017, Skelly generated controversy when she suggested cutting funding from the Hamilton Public Library as a way to cut taxes. Skelly's suggestion earned a strong online backlash, including from author Margaret Atwood. Following Skelly's remarks about the Hamilton Public Library, she made comments about the new Kitchener-Waterloo LRT line, calling the municipality's rapid transit project "not attractive", further generating controversy and leading Waterloo Region Record columnist Luisa D'Amato to write that Hamilton was "an industrial wasteland" filled with "angry and sketchy" people.

=== Provincial politics ===
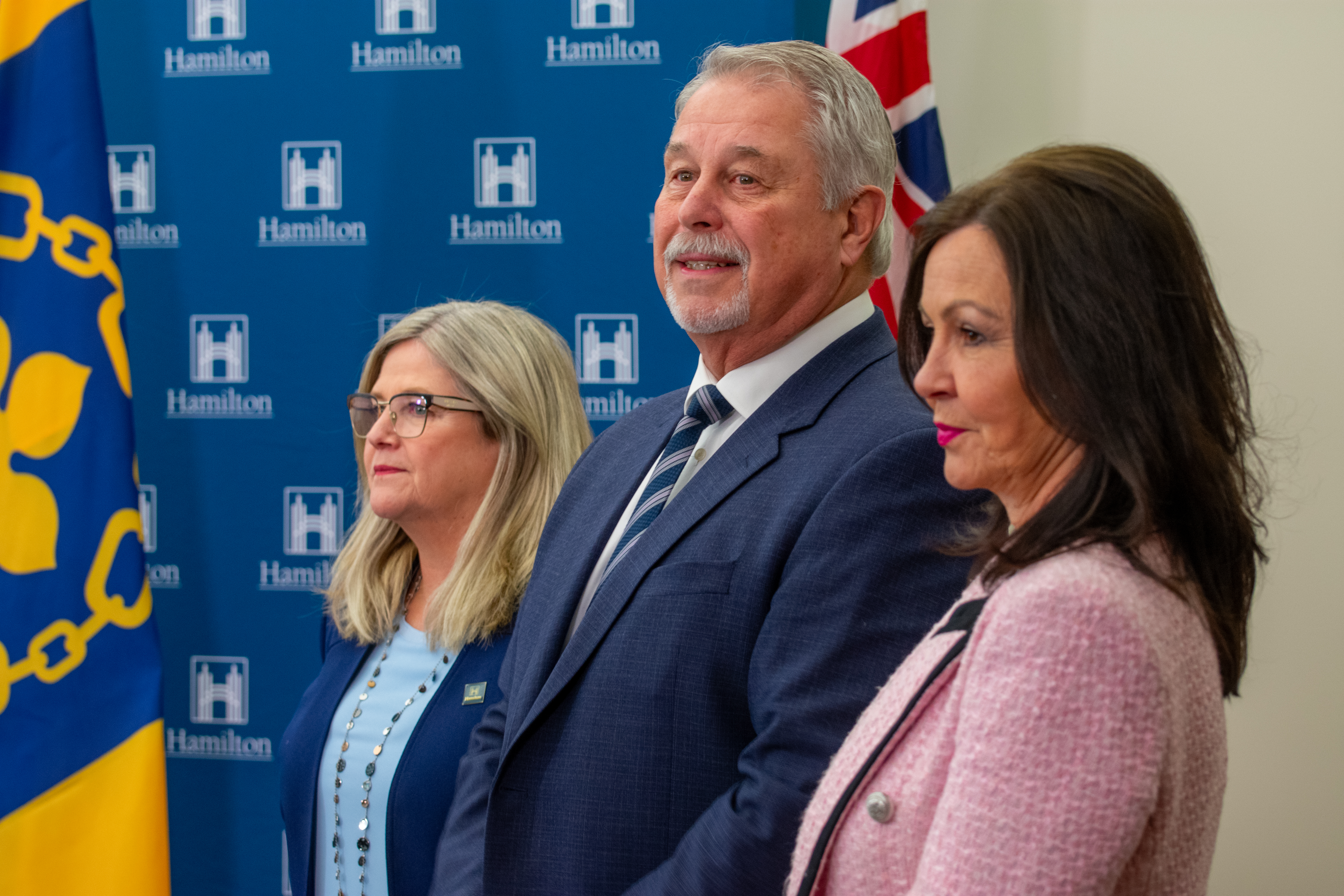
Skelly (right) with Neil Lumsden (centre) and Andrea Horwath (left) at a Building Faster Fund announcement in Hamilton, March 2024

In August 2017, rumours circulated that Skelly was the Progressive Conservative Party's preferred candidate in the newly created electoral district of Flamborough-Glanbrook. Three contestants for the seat - Dan Sadler, 2014 Hamilton Mountain PC candidate Albert Marshall, and Skelly's previous nomination opponent Nick Lauwers - were all informed by the party that their candidacies would not be approved by then-leader Patrick Brown. Both Lauwers and Marshall informed the Hamilton Mountain News that the party intended to acclaim a candidate, with the latter noting that the candidate sought would be a woman. At the time, Skelly did not confirm her interest in seeking the party's nomination.

The following month, Skelly announced her intention to seek the Progressive Conservative nomination in Flamborough-Glanbrook. Despite telling the Hamilton Mountain News at the time of her council by-election win that she was no longer a member of the party and that she did not see the seat as "a stepping stone", Skelly indicated that her reasons for running provincially were that she believed she could "do more for the entire city at the provincial level." Skelly was acclaimed as the party's candidate on October 5, 2017.

Following Brown's surprise resignation in 2018, Skelly endorsed Christine Elliott's unsuccessful bid to lead the Progressive Conservatives.

Skelly was the centre of controversy during the 2018 election campaign when PressProgress, the media wing of the Broadbent Institute, reported that Skelly had attended a Christmas event in 2017 organized by McMaster University and Mohawk College campus conservative groups and spoke about "Free Bird Media", an alt-right website that featured videos and interviews with far-right Canadian political figures such as Paul Fromm, James Sears, and Kevin J. Johnson. Free Bird Media's founder, Alex Van Hamme, indicated that Skelly told the crowd Canada needed more media like the site, though Skelly later said she did not know anything about Free Bird Media and was just "handed a hat" with the group's branding.

Skelly won the 2018 election with 43.5% of the popular vote. Shortly after being sworn in, Doug Ford announced Skelly would become the Parliamentary Assistant to Minister of Economic Development Jim Wilson.

During the COVID-19 pandemic in Ontario, Skelly launched a website called Relief Within Reach to connect local small businesses with available provincial and federal support programs. The initiative was praised by members of Hamilton City Council.

Skelly was re-elected in the 2022 Ontario general election.

In March 2023, Skelly announced that Carmeuse Lime Limited would not proceed with its controversial application to burn alternative low-carbon fuels at its Dundas operations. The plan, which was opposed by community group Dundas and Greensville Environmental Concern, Ward 13 councillor Alex Wilson, and Skelly's former political opponent who was elected to Hamilton city council representing Flamborough's Ward 15, Ted McMeekin, generated substantial community opposition relating to environmental concerns.

On April 14, 2025, Skelly was elected Speaker of the Legislative Assembly of Ontario for the 44th Parliament of Ontario. She is the province's first female Speaker. In October 2025, the Speaker created a new seating arrangement that ended a yearslong arrangement that was unique in Canada where independent MPPs, including MPPs from parties without official party status, could have front bench seats. The change moved Green Party of Ontario leader Mike Schreiner, Green MPP Aislinn Clancy and independently-elected Bobbi Ann Brady to the back bench. The change received pushback from all parties as well as Brady; Steve Clark, the government house leader wrote a letter to Skelly saying that it "conveys favourable treatment" of the government and that it would be fairer to preserve the existing arrangements. Skelly declined to reconsider, citing the non-partisan nature of her role.

== Personal life ==
Skelly was previously married to Rino Pirro, whom she divorced; he died in 2019. Through her marriage to Pirro, she has two sons, Dane and Cole.

== Election results ==
2022 Ontario general election: Flamborough—Glanbrook
Party	Candidate	Votes	%	±%	Expenditures
Progressive Conservative	Donna Skelly	20,306	46.20	+2.68	$95,819
New Democratic	Allison Cillis	9,995	22.74	–11.43	$44,216
Liberal	Melisse Willems	8,970	20.41	+4.97	$22,601
Green	Mario Portak	2,392	5.44	+0.97	$0
New Blue	Paul Simoes	1,492	3.39	–	$0
Ontario Party	Walt Juchniewicz	710	1.62	–	$0
Populist	Nikita Mahood	86	0.20	–	$0
Total valid votes		43,951	99.45	–	$131,884
Total rejected, unmarked and declined ballots		242	0.55	–0.47	
Turnout		44,193	46.91	–13.67	
Eligible voters		94,203			
Progressive Conservative hold		Swing		+7.05	
Source: Elections Ontario

2018 Ontario general election
Party	Candidate	Votes	%	±%
Progressive Conservative	Donna Skelly	22,454	43.53	+8.06
New Democratic	Melissa McGlashan	17,630	34.17	+11.51
Liberal	Judi Partridge	7,967	15.44	-20.14
Green	Janet Errygers	2,307	4.47	-0.07
Libertarian	Glenn Langton	541	1.05	
None of the Above	Rudy Miller	451	0.87	
Trillium	Roman Sarachman	238	0.46	
Total valid votes		51,588	98.98	
Total rejected, unmarked and declined ballots		531	1.02	
Turnout		52,119		
Eligible voters				
Progressive Conservative pickup new district.				
Source: Elections Ontario

Candidates for the March 21, 2016 Hamilton, Ontario Ward Seven Councillor By-Election
Candidate	Popular vote			Expenditures
Candidate	Votes	%	±%	Expenditures
Donna Skelly	1,967	19.59%	-	$30,524.46
John-Paul Danko	1,875	18.67%	-	$21,530.03
Uzma Qureshi	1,521	15.14%	-	$28,621.86
Shaun Burt	881	8.77%	-	n/a^{1}
Doug Farraway	785	7.82%	-	$12,657
Geraldine McMullen	720	7.17%	-	$27,112.84
Tom Gordon	468	4.66%	-	$2,681.09
Howard Rabb	376	3.74%	-	$17,696.61
Bob Charters	354	3.52%	-	n/a^{1}
Glenn Murphy	255	2.54%	-	$5,840.09
Chelsey Heroux	172	1.71%	-	n/a^{1}
Hans Zuriel	133	1.32%	-	$8,531.42
Philip Bradshaw	110	1.10%	-	$1,450.12
Robert Bolton	95	0.95%	-	n/a^{1}
Jeanne Pacey	95	0.95%	-	n/a^{1}
Louis Vecchioni	64	0.64%	-	$0
Anthony Nicholl	62	0.62%	-	n/a^{1}
Mohammad Shahrouri	48	0.48%	-	$160
Robert Young	22	0.22%	-	$930.87
Paul Nagy	17	0.17%	-	$0
Damin Starr	17	0.17%	-	$7,886.76
Luc Hetu	6	0.06%	-	n/a^{1}
Total votes	10,063	24.35%	=7.4%	$40,005.55
Registered voters	41,332			
^{1} These candidates did not submit official Financial Statements and are, therefore, ineligible to run in the 2018 Municipal election Note: All Hamilton Municipal Elections are officially non-partisan. Note: Candidate campaign colours are based on the prominent colour used in campaign items (signs, literature, etc.) and are used as a visual differentiation between candidates.
Sources: City of Hamilton, "Nominated Candidates" Archived 2010-08-20 at the Wayback Machine City of Hamilton, "2016 Candidate Financial Statements Archived September 5, 2018, at the Wayback Machine

2014 Ontario general election: Ancaster—Dundas—Flamborough—Westdale
Party	Candidate	Votes	%	±%
Liberal	Ted McMeekin	24,042	44.56	+0.86
Progressive Conservative	Donna Skelly	18,252	33.83	–0.75
New Democratic	Alex Johnstone	8,415	15.60	–1.60
Green	Raymond Dartsch	2,639	4.89	+1.91
Libertarian	Glenn Langton	423	0.78	+0.26
Freedom	Barry Spruce	188	0.35	+0.15
Total valid votes		53,959	98.48	
Total rejected, unmarked and declined ballots		835	1.52	+1.16
Turnout		54,794	59.02	+2.57
Eligible voters		92,833		
Liberal hold		Swing		+0.81
Source: Elections Ontario

2011 Ontario general election: Ancaster—Dundas—Flamborough—Westdale
Party	Candidate	Votes	%	±%
Liberal	Ted McMeekin	21,648	43.70	+2.53
Progressive Conservative	Donna Skelly	17,132	34.58	+0.17
New Democratic	Trevor Westerhoff	8,521	17.20	+3.48
Green	Erik Coverdale	1,477	2.98	–5.30
Family Coalition	Bob Maton	321	0.65	–0.46
Libertarian	Glenn Langton	258	0.52	+0.39
Freedom	Peter Melanson	99	0.20	–
Communist	Rick Gunderman Smith	87	0.18	–
Total valid votes		49,543	99.64	
Total rejected, unmarked and declined ballots		180	0.36	–0.16
Turnout		49,723	56.45	–1.67
Eligible voters		88,080		
Liberal hold		Swing		+1.18
Source: Elections Ontario
