= Westdale, Hamilton =

Westdale
- Neighbourhood
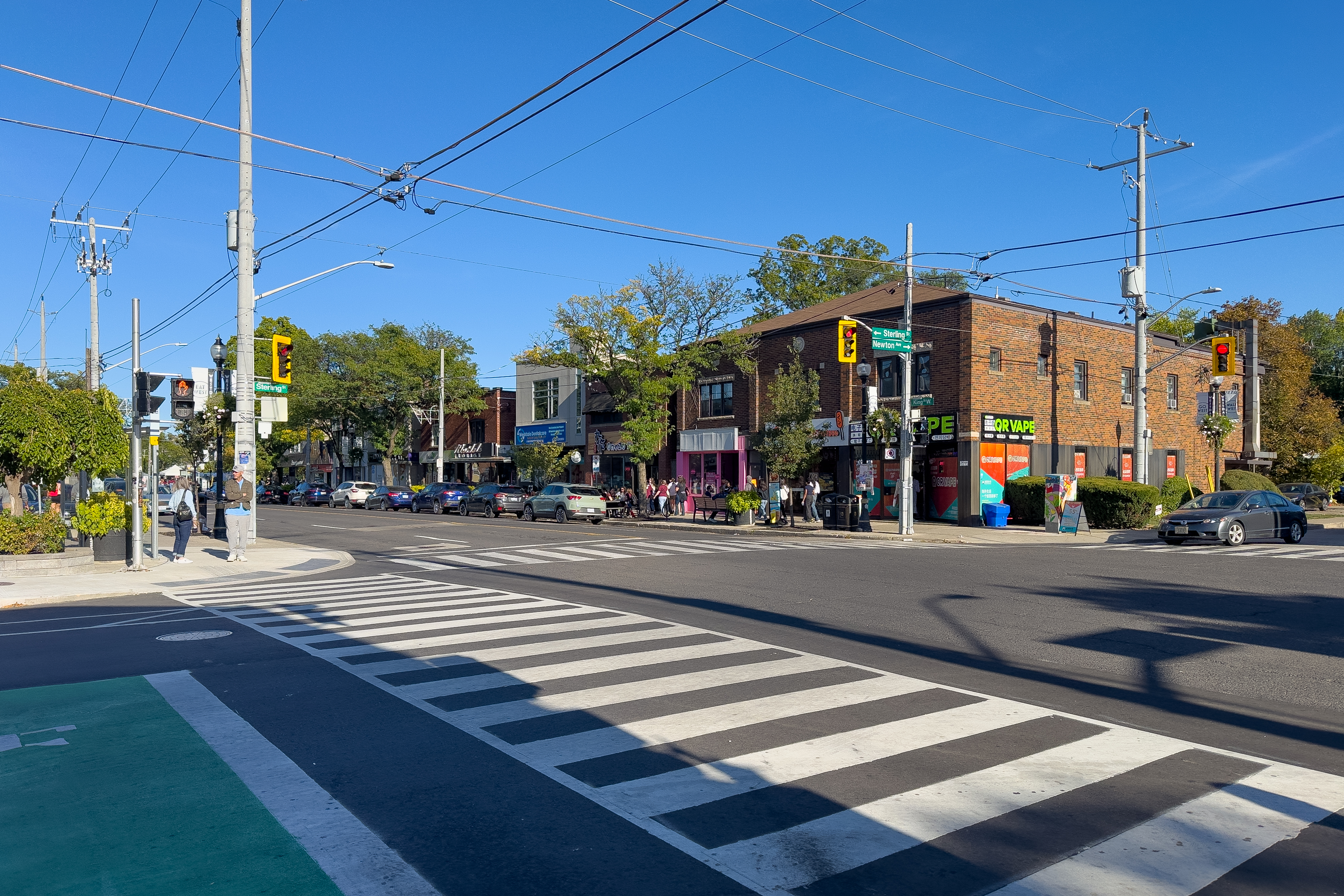
- Westdale in 2025
- Interactive map of Westdale
- Coordinates: 43°15′43″N 79°54′21″W
- Country: Canada
- Province: Ontario
- City: Hamilton
- Established: 1923

Westdale is a residential neighbourhood in Hamilton, Ontario, Canada. It is centred in the Westdale Village shopping district and located near McMaster University. It is bordered to the north by Cootes Paradise, an extensive nature reserve marking the western end of Lake Ontario, to the south by Main Street and Ainslie Wood, to the east by Highway 403, and to the west by McMaster University.

== Etymology ==
On 29 March 1923, real estate agents and politicians announced the winning name of a "Name the Neighbourhood" contest, at the Royal Connaught Hotel in downtown Hamilton. 6,170 people were gathered for the official announcement. Rev. Canon Percival Lawson Spencer won $200.00 for his submission of the "Westdale" name. Other names that were seriously considered for the neighbourhood include Westhome, Vimy Ridge, Bridgeton, Woodlands Park, Surrey Park and Bridgeview.

== History ==
Archaeological surveys have shown that the land south of what is now Cootes Paradise was inhabited by successive Indigenous nations. In the early seventeenth century, when the first French explorers and missionaries visited the western edge of Lake Ontario, they found the region populated by native people, who were referred to as the Neutral Nation because of their neutrality in the disputes between the Haudenosaunee Confederacy and the Wendat.

In the mid-seventeenth century, the Neutral Nation and the Wendat were defeated by the Haudenosaunee Confederacy. Eventually, Anishinaabe people from what is now northern Ontario began to push southwards and displace the Haudenosaunee. In 1792, the Mississaugas of the Credit First Nation and the Crown negotiated the Between the Lakes Treaty No. 3, allowing colonists to settle the area under the provisions of the Royal Proclamation of 1763.

=== Survey ===
Following the creation of Upper Canada in 1791, the land upon which Westdale is now located was surveyed as part of the Township of Barton. Shortly afterward, the boundary was adjusted, and the lots west of present-day Paradise Road were incorporated into the Township of Ancaster. This area of the township situated below the escarpment was commonly referred to as the Gore of Ancaster.

Following the transfer of the land from the Township of Barton to the Township of Ancaster, the land upon which Westdale is now located became lots 57 through 60 of Concession 1.

Early settlers of these lots include the Forsyths, Ashbaughs, Clines, Paisleys, Buttrums, Brambergers and Strouds. Land use was primarily devoted to agriculture.

=== Founding ===
The development that would become Westdale was an early Canadian implementation of the concepts of the Garden City Movement. In 1911, architect Robert Pope envisioned the area as a designed neighbourhood for 1,700 residents. That year J. J. McKittrick bought several hundred acres of land for the planned neighbourhood, first called Hamilton Gardens.

Construction began in the early 1920s. Spearheaded by W.J. Westaway's development company Westdale Properties and a contingent of local investors on the Westaway Citizens Committee, the project aimed to stimulate an upscale Protestant environment. Established on what had been predominantly farmland, its shopping district was constructed on King Street, the western end of a major Hamilton route. The major housing developments branched from Sterling Street, a wide tree-lined lane that ends at McMaster's east campus gates. By 1927, McMittrick Properties was bankrupt. That year, 377 acres of the development were sold to the City of Hamilton as the site of the Hamilton campus of McMaster University and the first lands of Royal Botanical Gardens.

Westdale was envisioned as an exclusive white Protestant neighbourhood. Specific groups such as Blacks, Asians, Slavs, and Jews were unable to purchase homes; near the end of the Second World War restrictions upon Jewish home ownership were lifted whereupon many relocated from the central part of the city—however, legal loopholes allowed for discrimination to persist into the 1950s. Over time, Westdale has become increasingly diverse, and vestiges of its former exclusivity have largely disappeared.

== Present ==
Although urban development has reduced the isolation once integral to Westdale's modelled environment, the Village persists as an established shopping destination for West Hamilton residents. The Westdale Village Business Improvement Association represents over 70 businesses located in the immediate Westdale area. The Westdale community is contained between Highway 403, Main Street and the areas east of McMaster. In addition to many small businesses, Westdale is also home to Churchill Park, situated on lands owned by Royal Botanical Gardens, a grocery store, a branch of the Hamilton Public Library, the Westdale Theatre and branches of three major banks.

The Westdale Theatre underwent a 4.5-million-dollar renovation funded by the community and organized by the Westdale Theatre Group that was completed in 2019. The purpose was to update the amenities of the theatre while still maintaining the historical building’s original Art Deco design and architecture. The renovations included updating the sound system, fixing the seating, and adding accessibility features. The goal of these updates was to support The Westdale Theatre in serving as a community hub for both film screenings and live performances.

The City of Hamilton is undergoing an effort to preserve and update the amenities in Westdale's Churchill Park. New amenities such as a renovated play structure, rain gardens to prevent flooding, and a gravel pathway around the park have been added. Additionally, native trees have been planted to create more shade within the park’s fields and to expand the boundaries of Cootes Paradise conservation area. Construction for phase 3 of the maintenance plan, which will complete the project, began in Spring of 2026.

== Student housing ==
The increase of McMaster's student population in recent decades has resulted in many Westdale homes being rented out to students.

In 2006, a few Westdale homeowners calling themselves WADS (Westdale Against Drunk Students) staged a rally to protest the student population and called for the McMaster pub, Quarters, to be closed. McMaster responded by setting up a mediation between surrounding homeowners and student residents, as well as clarifying that Quarters' closing would not fix the problems residents were facing, as students would go to other bars located in Westdale. Over 200 people attended the rally. After a sting operation, the Ontario Provincial Police charged the Bar with liquor license violations, alleging the Bar over-served its student patrons. Recently, the Court of Appeal for Ontario found the bar had violated the law by over-serving a patron who went on to run down a pedestrian with his truck. The case, McIntyre v. Grigg, made Canadian legal history when it awarded punitive damages against a drunk driver.

The Westdale Village BIA, the Ainslie Wood / Westdale Community Association (AWWCA) and McMaster University formed the Campus Town Association in late 2004. The CTA was formed to address concerns facing both the community and the university.

The City of Hamilton started to enforce a nuisance bylaw that was introduced by the City in 2022 for major McMaster University events following a rowdy party during 2021 homecoming where a car was flipped over and damaged. This includes zero tolerance for nuisance bylaws within university-adjacent areas of the Westdale neighbourhood and increased police monitoring of student parties in West Hamilton. There have been fewer nuisance parties since the bylaw was introduced.

== Politics ==
Westdale is currently part of the federal electoral district of Hamilton West—Ancaster—Dundas and, since 2025, has been represented by Member of Parliament John-Paul Danko of the Liberal Party.

Following a redistribution of provincial constituencies, Westdale shifted from being part of the Ancaster—Dundas—Flamborough—Westdale riding into the newly created constituency of Hamilton West—Ancaster—Dundas. In the 2018 Ontario Provincial Election, this seat was won by current New Democrat Member of Provincial Parliament Sandy Shaw.

On the Municipal level, Westdale is part of Hamilton's Ward 1 and has been represented by Maureen Wilson as city councillor since 2018. At the public school board level Westdale is represented by Elizabeth Wong as Ward 1 trustee. On Hamilton's Catholic school board, Westdale is represented by Wards 1, 2, and 15 trustee Mark Valvasori.

== Education ==
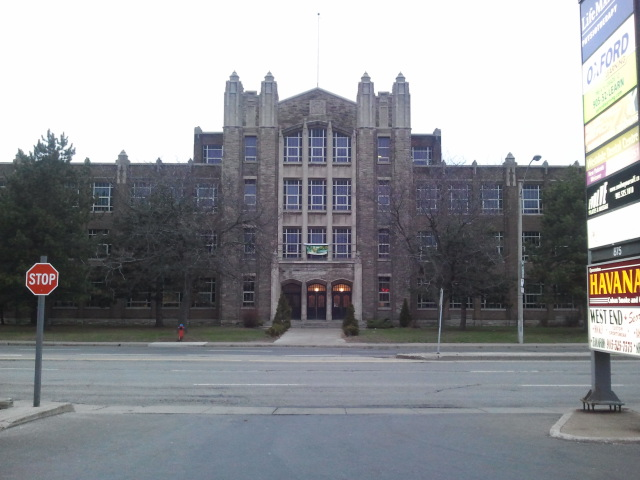
Westdale Secondary School

Aside from McMaster University, four public schools are located in Westdale: Westdale Secondary School, École secondaire Georges-P.-Vanier, Dalewood Middle School, and Cootes Paradise Elementary School. Cootes Paradise Elementary School was previously known as George R. Allan; however, the name was changed when the school underwent an expansion to accommodate students from Ainslie Wood's Prince Philip Elementary School. As a result of the merger, the new school was named Cootes Paradise Elementary School in September 2014.
