= 37th Parliament of Ontario =

Parliamentary session of the Ontario Provincial Parliament

- Majority parliament
- Jun. 8, 1999 – May. 5, 2003

Parliament leaders
- Premier: Mike Harris
- Ernie Eves; April 15, 2002 – October 22, 2003
- Leader of the Opposition: Dalton McGuinty

Party caucuses
- Government: Progressive Conservative Party
- Opposition: Liberal Party
- Recognized: New Democratic Party

Legislative Assembly
- Speaker of the Assembly: Gary Carr

Sovereign
- Monarch: Elizabeth II; 6 February 1952 – present
← 36th	→ 38th

The 37th Legislative Assembly of Ontario, Canada's most populous province, was in session from June 8, 1999, until May 5, 2003. Its membership was set by the general election of 1999. Majority was held by the Ontario Progressive Conservative Party led by Mike Harris.

During the 36th Legislative Assembly of Ontario, Harris' government had passed legislation which realigned provincial electoral districts to match the boundaries in use for federal districts; accordingly, the 37th Assembly had a reduced number of seats, with just 103 members compared to 130 in the previous session.

In the March 2002 leadership convention, following Mike Harris' resignation announcement, Ernie Eves was elected party leader.

Gary Carr served as speaker for the assembly.

▀	▀	▀	▀	*	▀	▀	▀	▀	▀	▀	▀	▀	▀	▀	▀
▀	▀	*	*	*	▀	▀	▀	▀	▀	▀	▀	▀	▀	▀	▀	▀	▀	▀	▀	▀	*	▀	*	▀
▀	▀	*	*	*	▀	▀	▀	▀	▀	▀	▀	▀	▀	▀	▀	▀	▀	▀	▀	▀	*	▀	*	▀
▀	▀	*	*	*	▀	▀	▀	▀	▀	▀	▀	▀	▀	▀	▀	▀	▀	▀	▀	▀	*	▀	*	▀
▀

▀	*	*	*	*	▀	▀	▀	▀	▀	▀	▀	▀	▀	▀	▀	▀	▀	▀	▀	▀	▀	▀	▀	▀
▀	▀	▀	▀	*	▀	▀	▀	▀	▀	▀	▀	▀	▀	▀	▀	▀	▀	▀	▀	▀	▀	▀	▀	▀
▀	▀	▀	▀	*	▀	▀	▀	▀	▀	▀	▀	▀	▀	▀	▀	▀	▀	▀	▀	▀	▀	▀	▀	▀
▀	▀	▀	▀	*	▀	▀	▀	▀	▀	▀	▀	▀	▀	▀	▀	▀	▀	▀	▀	▀	▀	▀	▀

== Members ==
Riding	Member	Party	First elected / previously elected	No. of terms	Notes
Algoma—Manitoulin	Michael A. Brown	Liberal	1987	4th term	
Ancaster—Dundas—Flamborough—Aldershot	Ted McMeekin (2000)	Liberal	2000	1st term	By-election in 2000. See Wentworth—Burlington below for predecessor.
Barrie—Simcoe—Bradford	Joe Tascona	Progressive Conservative	1995	2nd term	
Beaches—East York	Frances Lankin (Note: resigned seat)	New Democratic Party	1990	3rd term	
Beaches—East York	Michael Prue (2001)	New Democratic Party	2001	1st term	By-election in 2001.
Bramalea—Gore—Malton—Springdale	Raminder Gill	Progressive Conservative	1999	1st term	
Brampton Centre	Joe Spina	Progressive Conservative	1995	2nd term	
Brampton West—Mississauga	Tony Clement	Progressive Conservative	1995	2nd term	
Brant	Dave Levac	Liberal	1999	1st term	
Bruce—Grey—Owen Sound	Bill Murdoch	Progressive Conservative	1990	3rd term	Riding named Bruce—Grey from 1999 to June 2000
Burlington	Cam Jackson	Progressive Conservative	1985	5th term	
Cambridge	Gerry Martiniuk	Progressive Conservative	1995	2nd term	
Chatham—Essex—Kent	Pat Hoy	Liberal	1995	2nd term	
Davenport	Tony Ruprecht	Liberal	1981	6th term	
Don Valley East	David Caplan	Liberal	1997	2nd term	
Don Valley West	David Turnbull	Progressive Conservative	1990	3rd term	
Dufferin—Peel—Wellington—Grey	David Tilson	Progressive Conservative	1990	3rd term	
Dufferin—Peel—Wellington—Grey	Ernie Eves (2002)	Progressive Conservative	1981, (Note: Parry Sound) 2002	7th term*	By-election on May 2, 2002. Premier of Ontario from April 15, 2002.
Durham	John O'Toole	Progressive Conservative	1995	2nd term	
Eglinton—Lawrence	Mike Colle	Liberal	1995	2nd term	
Elgin—Middlesex—London	Steve Peters	Liberal	1999	1st term	
Erie—Lincoln	Tim Hudak	Progressive Conservative	1995	2nd term	
Essex	Bruce Crozier	Liberal	1993	3rd term	
Etobicoke Centre	Chris Stockwell	Progressive Conservative	1990	3rd term	
Etobicoke North	John Hastings	Progressive Conservative	1995	2nd term	
Etobicoke—Lakeshore	Morley Kells	Progressive Conservative	1981, 1995	3rd term*	
Glengarry—Prescott—Russell	Jean-Marc Lalonde	Liberal	1995	2nd term	
Guelph—Wellington	Brenda Elliott	Progressive Conservative	1995	2nd term	
Haldimand—Norfolk—Brant	Toby Barrett	Progressive Conservative	1995	2nd term	
Haliburton—Victoria—Brock	Chris Hodgson	Progressive Conservative	1994	3rd term	
Halton	Ted Chudleigh	Progressive Conservative	1995	2nd term	
Hamilton East	Dominic Agostino	Liberal	1995	2nd term	
Hamilton Mountain	Marie Bountrogianni	Liberal	1999	1st term	
Hamilton West	David Christopherson	New Democratic Party	1990	3rd term	
Hastings—Frontenac—Lennox and Addington	Leona Dombrowsky	Liberal	1999	1st term	
Huron—Bruce	Helen Johns	Progressive Conservative	1995	2nd term	
Kenora—Rainy River	Howard Hampton	New Democratic Party	1987	4th term	Party leader.
Kingston and the Islands	John Gerretsen	Liberal	1995	2nd term	
Kitchener Centre	Wayne Wettlaufer	Progressive Conservative	1995	2nd term	
Kitchener—Waterloo	Elizabeth Witmer	Progressive Conservative	1990	3rd term	
Lambton—Kent—Middlesex	Marcel Beaubien	Progressive Conservative	1995	2nd term	
Lanark—Carleton	Norm Sterling	Progressive Conservative	1977	7th term	
Leeds—Grenville	Bob Runciman	Progressive Conservative	1981	6th term	
London North Centre	Dianne Cunningham	Progressive Conservative	1988	4th term	
London West	Bob Wood	Progressive Conservative	1995	2nd term	
London—Fanshawe	Frank Mazzilli	Progressive Conservative	1999	1st term	
Markham	David Tsubouchi	Progressive Conservative	1995	2nd term	
Mississauga Centre	Rob Sampson	Progressive Conservative	1995	2nd term	
Mississauga East	Carl DeFaria	Progressive Conservative	1995	2nd term	
Mississauga South	Margaret Marland	Progressive Conservative	1985	5th term	
Mississauga West	John Snobelen	Progressive Conservative	1995	2nd term	
Nepean—Carleton	John Baird	Progressive Conservative	1995	2nd term	
Niagara Centre	Peter Kormos	New Democratic Party	1988	4th term	
Niagara Falls	Bart Maves	Progressive Conservative	1995	2nd term	
Nickel Belt	Shelley Martel	New Democratic Party	1987	4th term	
Nipissing	Mike Harris	Progressive Conservative	1981	6th term	Premier to April 15, 2002.
Nipissing	Al McDonald (2002)	Progressive Conservative	2002	1st term	By-election in 2002.
Northumberland	Doug Galt	Progressive Conservative	1995	2nd term	
Oak Ridges	Frank Klees	Progressive Conservative	1995	2nd term	
Oakville	Gary Carr	Progressive Conservative	1990	3rd term	
Oshawa	Jerry Ouellette	Progressive Conservative	1995	2nd term	
Ottawa Centre	Richard Patten	Liberal	1987, 1995	3rd term*	
Ottawa South	Dalton McGuinty	Liberal	1990	3rd term	Leader of the Liberal Party; Leader of the Opposition.
Ottawa West—Nepean	Garry Guzzo	Progressive Conservative	1995	2nd term	
Ottawa—Orléans	Brian Coburn	Progressive Conservative	1999	1st term	Riding named Carleton—Gloucester from 1999 to June 2000.
Ottawa—Vanier	Claudette Boyer	Liberal (Note: later Independent)	1999	1st term	
Ottawa—Vanier	Claudette Boyer	Independent	1999	1st term	
Oxford	Ernie Hardeman	Progressive Conservative	1995	2nd term	
Parkdale—High Park	Gerard Kennedy	Liberal	1996	2nd term	
Parry Sound—Muskoka	Ernie Eves	Progressive Conservative	1981	6th term	Resigned in 2001; later returned to Legislature in another seat.
Parry Sound—Muskoka	Norm Miller (2001)	Progressive Conservative	2001	1st term	By-election in 2001.
Perth—Middlesex	Bert Johnson	Progressive Conservative	1995	2nd term	
Peterborough	Gary Stewart	Progressive Conservative	1995	2nd term	
Pickering—Ajax—Uxbridge	Janet Ecker	Progressive Conservative	1995	2nd term	
Prince Edward—Hastings	Ernie Parsons	Liberal	1999	1st term	
Renfrew—Nipissing—Pembroke	Sean Conway	Liberal	1975	8th term	
Sarnia—Lambton	Caroline Di Cocco	Liberal	1999	1st term	
Sault Ste. Marie	Tony Martin	New Democratic Party	1990	3rd term	
Scarborough Centre	Marilyn Mushinski	Progressive Conservative	1995	2nd term	
Scarborough East	Steve Gilchrist	Progressive Conservative	1995	2nd term	
Scarborough Southwest	Dan Newman	Progressive Conservative	1995	2nd term	
Scarborough—Agincourt	Gerry Phillips	Liberal	1987	4th term	
Scarborough—Rouge River	Alvin Curling	Liberal	1985	5th term	
Simcoe North	Garfield Dunlop	Progressive Conservative	1999	1st term	
Simcoe—Grey	Jim Wilson	Progressive Conservative	1990	3rd term	
St. Catharines	Jim Bradley	Liberal	1977	7th term	
St. Paul's	Michael Bryant	Liberal	1999	1st term	
Stoney Creek	Brad Clark	Progressive Conservative	1999	1st term	
Stormont—Dundas—Charlottenburgh	John Cleary	Liberal	1987	4th term	
Sudbury	Rick Bartolucci	Liberal	1995	2nd term	
Thornhill	Tina Molinari	Progressive Conservative	1999	1st term	
Thunder Bay—Atikokan	Lyn McLeod	Liberal	1987	4th term	
Thunder Bay—Superior North	Michael Gravelle	Liberal	1995	2nd term	
Timiskaming—Cochrane	David James Ramsay	Liberal (Note: First elected as a New Democrat)	1985	5th term	
Timmins—James Bay	Gilles Bisson	New Democratic Party	1990	3rd term	
Toronto Centre—Rosedale	George Smitherman	Liberal	1999	1st term	
Toronto—Danforth	Marilyn Churley	New Democratic Party	1990	3rd term	Riding named Broadview—Greenwood from 1999 to June 2000.
Trinity—Spadina	Rosario Marchese	New Democratic Party	1990	3rd term	
Vaughan—King—Aurora	Al Palladini	Progressive Conservative	1995	2nd term	Died 2001.
Vaughan—King—Aurora	Greg Sorbara (2002)	Liberal	1985, (Note: York North/York Centre) 2002	4th term*	By-election in 2002.
Waterloo—Wellington	Ted Arnott	Progressive Conservative	1990	3rd term	
Wentworth—Burlington	Toni Skarica	Progressive Conservative	1995	2nd term	Resigned in 2000; riding was renamed. See Ancaster—Dundas—Flamborough—Aldershot above for successor.
Whitby—Ajax	Jim Flaherty	Progressive Conservative	1995	2nd term	
Willowdale	David Young	Progressive Conservative	1999	1st term	
Windsor West	Sandra Pupatello	Liberal	1995	2nd term	
Windsor—St. Clair	Dwight Duncan	Liberal	1995	2nd term	
York Centre	Monte Kwinter	Liberal	1985	5th term	
York North	Julia Munro	Progressive Conservative	1995	2nd term	
York South—Weston	Joseph Cordiano	Liberal	1985	5th term	
York West	Mario Sergio	Liberal	1995	2nd term	

== See also ==
- Members in Parliament 37
