= Ainslie Wood, Hamilton =

Neighbourhood in Hamilton, Ontario, Canada

Coordinates: 43°15′20″N 79°55′30″W

Ainslie Wood is a residential neighbourhood in Hamilton, Ontario, Canada. It is centered on Alexander Park and located near McMaster University. It is bordered to the north by Main Street, Cootes Drive and Dundas, to the south and east by Highway 403, and to the west by Dundas and Ancaster.

== Etymology ==
In 1838, George Howlett Ainslie moved onto a sixty-acre farm near Ancaster. It was south of what is now Main Street West and west of Longwood Road. This greenspace became a popular recreation area for Hamilton residents and gained the name Ainslie Wood, which eventually was applied to the entire area between Hamilton and Ancaster.

== History ==
The land south of what is now Cootes Paradise was inhabited by a series of native societies. In the early 17th century, European explorers and missionaries visited western Lake Ontario, encountering a population of native people, who were referred to as the Neutral Nation, from their neutrality in conflicts between the Iroquois Confederacy and the Huron.

In the mid-17th century, the Iroquois defeated the Neutrals and the Hurons. Ojibway from north Ontario moved south and displaced the Iroquois. Later, Europeans displaced the Ojibway.

=== Early Settlers ===
Early European pioneers in Ainslie Wood included the Ainslie, Binkley, Bowman, Buttrum, Cline, Ewen, Forsyth, Radford, Stroud and Horning families.

Early farmhouses were located at today's 54 Sanders Boulevard (built in 1847 by the Binkley family, still standing), 19 Lower Horning Road (built by the Ofield family, still standing), 51 Lower Horning Road and 1686 Main Street West (Binkley family, now a huge student residence with some ground-floor storefronts).

Much of the area of north Ainslie Wood was taken up with the Binkley family farm. This multigenerational farm stretched north of Main Street roughly from McMaster University to the Ancaster Creek Valley and into University Gardens in Dundas. Indeed, the junction of the Dundas and Ancaster roads (today the intersection of Main St, Wilson St, and Osler St) was popularly known as "Binkley's Corner." Marks and Mathelena, the original Binkleys to arrive in the Hamilton area, are buried in the Marks Binkley Cemetery at the end of Lakelet Drive. Marks and Mathelena Binkley were originally Palatine Germans, often referred to as "Pennsylvania Dutch," in reference to the low German language spoken by religious non-conformists who hailed from Switzerland, Germany, and Holland. "Binkley" is an Anglicization of their original Swiss-Italian name, which was "Binggeli." Their ancestors had moved to Lancaster County, Pennsylvania, an Amish and Mennonite settlement. The Binkley family prospered in Ainslie Wood and raised hundreds of grand- and great-grandchildren, and the name has appeared on schools, churches, road signs, and cemeteries throughout Ainslie Wood.

George Bamberger started Ainslie Wood's first non-farming business—a hotel/tavern called the Halfway House (so named because it was halfway between Hamilton, Dundas and Ancaster), located on land on Main Street West today used by Canadian Martyrs' School. Trains that crossed the Bamberger property were required, by a contract with the Bamberger family, to stop at the Halfway House for a minimum of five minutes, so that passengers could buy beer. The Halfway House's bartender would give the train operators a free beer each at the four-minute mark, to delay their leaving and provide the thirsty passengers more time to spend money. When the train did get going, passengers could, in season, reach out a train window and pick ripe cherries from the branches as they passed through the Bamberger's orchards.

The area of Colombia International College and Camelot Towers and Highway 403 was, from the earliest days of European settlement, a popular picnicking spot. There were gardens with picnic tables, shade trees, swings, tame raccoons and caged parrots. As it was on forested land owned by the Ainslie Family, the spot was known as Ainslie Wood – a name which would later be applied to the whole community. In the early days, however, the area now known as Ainslie Wood was most often called "the Gore of Ancaster." (A gore is a triangle-shaped piece of land.) Until the 20th century, Ainslie Wood was governed as a part of Ancaster.

During the 19th century, a tannery processed cow-skins into leather at the corner of Main Street and Osler Drive. It was demolished in 1880. Apartment buildings now occupy the site.

Main Street West (then called the Hamilton and Brantford Road) was covered with wooden planks in the early 19th century, covered with stones in 1846 and paved by the 1860s.

In 1908, the Burke Real Estate Company bought the Bamberger farmland, breaking it into smaller lots and building new public streets. Emerson, Broadway and Bowman streets and the streets that crossed them, in the area just to the south of today's McMaster University, featured the first non-farm dwellings in Ainslie Wood. Sales posters boasted of "The Ideal Suburban Survey," with 40' x 140' lots that were advertised as being "20 Minutes from Centre of City" on 5-cents-a-ride electric trains. The new suburb had no indoor plumbing, no sidewalks, muddy roads, no electricity and stray cows. Residents got water from a communal pump at the corner of Emerson Street and Holmes Avenue.

There was a creek that ran through the centre of Ainslie Wood back then, in what is now Ontario Hydro's electricity-transmission field. The Buttrum family farmed potatoes and other vegetables on the hydro field from 1910 on.

Before World War I, there were about 125 families living in Ainslie Wood. There were several stores, a volunteer fire brigade and a resident police constable named George "Fatty" Smith. The people of Ainslie Wood enjoyed a recreation hall, built by George Bowman in 1912, at the North-west end of 4th Avenue (now Royal Ave.) Residents enjoyed costume parties and dances hosted by the West Hamilton Literary Society. In 1912, a soccer team was formed to play against teams from Dundas and Hamilton. An open field on Emerson Street, near Royal Avenue, held sporting events and garden parties. Boxing and baseball were popular.

=== Rifle Range and World War I ===
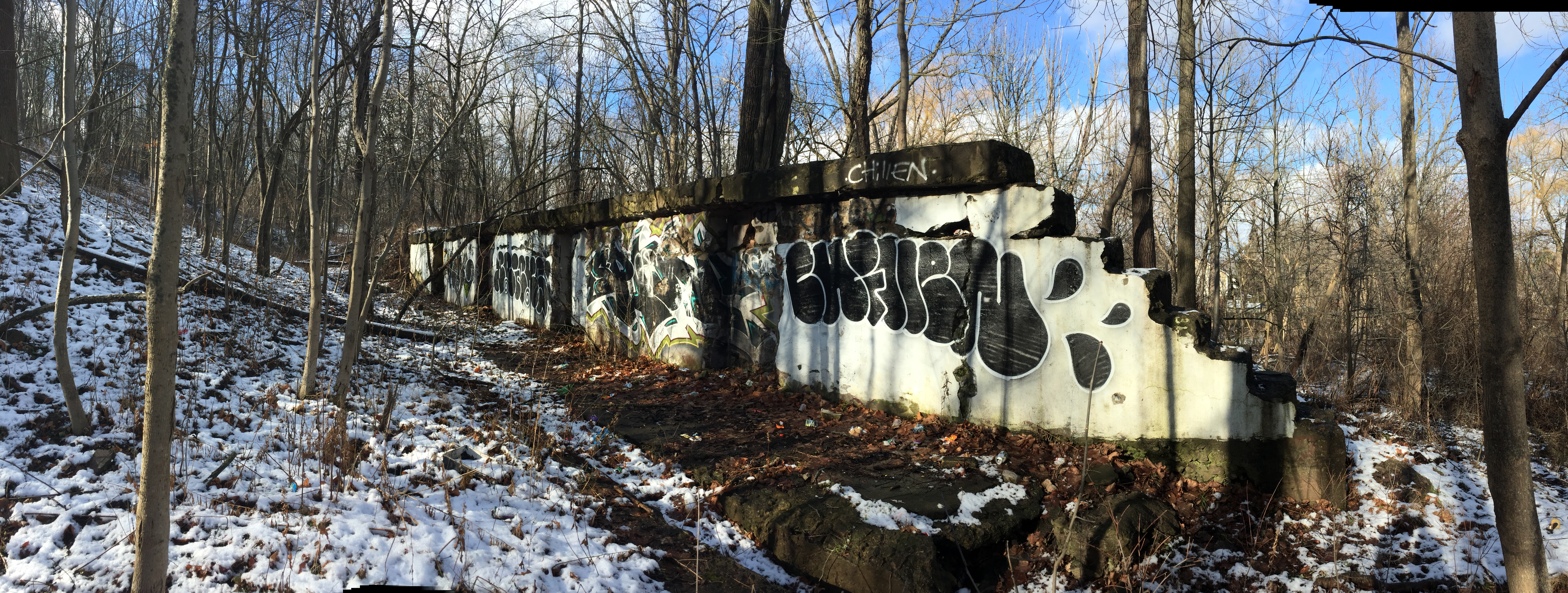
Remains of the rifle range in Ainslie Wood in Hamilton, Ontario

In the late 19th century, soldiers from the 13th Royal Regiment of Hamilton – now called the Royal Hamilton Light Infantry – used land around today's Rifle Range Road for rifle practice, shooting at concrete bunkers on the Escarpment where targets were set up. There are remains of the target bunkers in the forest south of Alexander Park, while further up the escarpment slope, across the 403 highway, are the remains of a tall stone wall built to protect the cars of the Brantford & Hamilton Railway (the wall may be seen from the recreational Chedoke Radial Trail). Rifle Range Road lost its namesake facility in 1928, when the 13th Regiment started practicing elsewhere.

In World War I, young soldiers from all over the Hamilton area trained for the battlefields of Europe in Ainslie Wood. They practiced with rifles, machine guns and hand grenades at the target facilities along Rifle Range Road, also digging practice trenches and using bayonets in what is now Alexander Park. Stray bullets sometimes flew into residential areas.

After World War I, local residents raised $2,200 to buy some land beside Emerson Street's St. Margaret's Church (now St. George's) and plant memorial trees for each of the 14 local men killed in combat.

Sidewalks began to be built in Ainslie Wood after World War I and roads began to be covered with rock-chunks and gravel, reducing but not eliminating the problem of springtime mud. The rock-chunks were hauled in horse-drawn wagons from the Escarpment, where the rock had previously been dynamited to build a railway line; the gravel came from a quarry in Dundas. After that, the roads were able for the first time to carry heavy truck and bus traffic.

In 1925, the neighbouring community of Westdale was built. As only white, Protestant people were allowed to buy property in Westdale, Jews, Catholics, Slavs and people of colour who wanted to live in West Hamilton had no choice but Ainslie Wood. Westdale's restrictive title covenants held sway until the 1950s, with accusations of discrimination continuing for decades afterwards. In Ainslie Wood, minorities were welcome; today, Ainslie Wood is still a diverse community.

With the establishment of McMaster University in 1930, Ainslie Wood gained proximity to its educational and other resources. In the same year, Ainslie Wood left Ancaster and joined Hamilton, after Hamilton Mayor John Peebles promised Ainslie Wood residents fully paved streets and indoor plumbing.

In the poverty-stricken 1930s and after, Hamilton Street Railway buses went up and down unpaved Emerson Street, sharing the dirt road with horse-drawn wagons, farm vehicles, pedestrians, stray dogs and occasional farm animals.

=== World War II and after ===
In World War II, many small, inexpensive homes were built in Ainslie Wood East for Hamilton's war-expanded industrial labour force. After the war, many empty lots in Ainslie Wood were sold for $1 to veterans. The central area of Emerson Street had a post office and several busy stores, such as Hemingway's Butcher and Bowman's Lumber (now Aitchison Lumber). There was light industry, such as Donald Wire and Rope (where Fortino's and St. Mary's school are now), John Deere (where the Mondelez International candy factory is now) Ralph & Sons Fuels (where Wendy's is now) and candymaker Walter E. Jacques & Sons (on Ewen, where Onyx Condos was built).

Before World War II, about half the lots in Ainslie Wood were vacant. Only a few streets had sidewalks then and none were paved. By 1955, all of the streets had sidewalks, and almost all were well-paved. Many old frame houses were raised to install full basements. After 1955, it was popular to cover old houses with aluminum siding.

In the 1960s, Whitney Avenue was extended to Main Street West. New sub-divisions sprang up on the old farms west of central Ainslie Wood. A new park on Whitney Avenue, Alexander Park, was opened by and named after the Governor General of Canada, Field Marshal Alexander. This park now has baseball diamonds and a wading pool. In 1966, the 403 Highway was extended up the side of the Escarpment to the south of Ainslie Wood.

A group of local volunteers based out of St. Margaret's Church (now St. George's) on Emerson Street, the Women's Institute, did much volunteer work. They fed hungry families. They knit wool mittens and donated books for school children. They lobbied successfully for a skating rink to be built on Leland Street, with a hut for children to put on skates. The Women's Institute also lobbied for Ainslie Wood's first traffic light, at the corner of Main Street and Broadway Avenue.

=== Present ===
In recent years, Ainslie Wood has faced many challenges, such as illegal lodging homes for students, a lack of recreational facilities and greenspace, the closure of Prince Philip School, poverty, traffic and zoning issues. Ainslie Wood has many strengths, including proximity to McMaster and the forest-covered Escarpment, the Rail Trail, Stroud Park, Alexander Park, two Catholic Schools (Canadian Martyr's and St. Mary's), a Hebrew academy, Columbia International College, several churches of various denominations, a thriving commercial zone along Main Street West and an active community association: the Ainslie Wood Community Association, or A.W.C.A.

== Education ==
The first public school, Binkley School was founded in 1815, followed by Princess Elizabeth (originally the West Hamilton School and now used as the Hamilton Hebrew Academy) in 1922 and Prince Philip in 1953. Binkley was closed in 1979, Princess Elizabeth in 1982 and in 2014 the children of Ainslie Wood lost Prince Philip elementary school after a controversial vote against Prince Philip by the local trustee, who left office soon afterwards.

== Student housing ==
The increase of McMaster University's student population in recent decades has resulted in many Ainslie Wood homes being rented out to students. Multiple high-rise student and mixed-use residences are being planned in the area, at 17 Ewen Rd & 20 Rifle Range Rd, 1629-1655 Main St W and 69 Sanders Blvd & 1630 Main St W.

== Transportation ==
Currently, there are 8 bus routes (including branches) operated Hamilton Street Railway running through Ainslie Wood.

On Main Street West:

- 10 B-Line Express
- 1A King (weekdays)
- 5 Delaware (Dundas-Head Street to Stoney Creek-Downtown)
- 5B Delaware (Dundas-Pirie Drive to Mount Albion)

On Whitney Avenue & Emerson Street:

- 5A Delaware (Ancaster-Meadowlands to Greenhill & Cochrane)
- 51 University (weekdays and Saturdays)

== Politics ==
On Hamilton City Council, Ainslie Wood is part of Ward 1 (Chedoke-Cootes). This ward has been represented by Maureen Wilson since 2018.

Provincially, Ainslie Wood is part of Hamilton West—Ancaster—Dundas. This riding is represented by Sandy Shaw of the Ontario New Democratic Party.

Ainslie Wood is part of the federal riding of Hamilton West—Ancaster—Dundas. In the 2025 federal election, that seat was won by John-Paul Danko of the Liberal Party.
