= CKW =

CKW may refer to:

== Places ==
- Graeme Rowley Aerodrome (IATA airport code: CKW), Pilbara, Western Australia, Australia
- Choa Chu Kang West station (station code: CKW), on the Jurong Region MRT line, at Choa Chu Kang, Singapore; see List of Singapore MRT stations
- Calderdale, Kirklees, Wakefield; a service region of Yorkshire Ambulance Service

== Business ==
- Centralschweizerische Kraftwerke (CKW), a Swiss energy company, and division of Axpo Holding
- community knowledge workers in the agricultural value chain
- creative knowledge work for knowledge workers

== Other uses ==
- Kaqchikel language (ISO 639 language code: ckw)
- Coffman–Kundu–Wootters inequality, which characterizes monogamy of entanglement in quantum physics

== See also ==
- CKW3
- CKW5
- CKW6
- CKW7
- CKW8
- CKWS (disambiguation)
