= Ancaster—Dundas—Flamborough—Westdale =

Ancaster—Dundas—Flamborough—Westdale could refer to:

- Ancaster—Dundas—Flamborough—Westdale (federal electoral district)
- Ancaster—Dundas—Flamborough—Westdale (provincial electoral district)
