= Netball at the 1998 Commonwealth Games squads =

Netball players at the 1998 Commonwealth Games

This is a list of netball players at the 1998 Commonwealth Games.

== Squads ==
=== Group A ===
Participating teams and rosters
Australia	Barbados	Canada	England	Jamaica	Malaysia
Carissa Tombs; Liz Ellis; Jenny Borlase; Janine Ilitch; Kathryn Harby; Nicole Cusack; Rebecca Sanders; Simone McKinnis; Shelley O'Donnell; Sarah Sutter; Sharelle McMahon; Vicki Wilson (c)	Denese Alleyne; Lydia Bishop; Latonia Blackman; Jacqueline Browne; Sandra Harper; Marion Johnson; Sherry Ann Martindale; Julie Phillips; Shonette Azore; Joan Scantlebury; Don Small; Olivia Walcott; Linda Wilson	Kimberly Anderson; Joanne Burns; Shirley-Anne George; Shawnette Hardware; Shernette Hardware; Maria Hodgins; Marina Leigertwood; Kristine Spekkens; Nicola Steiner; Shelley Sung; Keisha Wilson	Amanda Newton; Fiona Murtagh (c); Hellen Manufor; Joanne Zinzan; Karen Aspinall; Lisa Stanley; Lorraine Law; Lucia Sdao (vc); Lyn Carpenter; Naomi Siddall; Olivia Murphy; Tracey Neville	Nadine Bryan; Margaret Byfield; Elaine Davis; Roniesh Davis; Connie Francis; Nadine French; Georgia Gordon; Oberon Pitterson; Nerine Riley; Sharmalee Watkins; Tashna Walker; Sharon Wiles	Hanizah Hashim; Tang Mee Huong; Roslina Ismail; Rohaida Ismail; Puah Pei Ling; Kuah Seow Peng; Wan Norafzan Wan Mahadi; Siti Afizah Mohamad Noh; Aidah Ariffin Nor; Wong Mei Yee; Seow Li Yoong
Head Coach: Jill McIntosh	Head Coach: Anna Shepherd	Head Coach: Ann Willcocks	Head Coach: Mary Beardwood	Head Coach: Maureen Hall	Head Coach:
Assistant coach:	Assistant coach:	Assistant coach:	Assistant coach: Denise Egan	Manager: Marva Bernard	Assistant coach:

=== Group B ===
Participating teams and rosters
Cook Islands	Malawi	New Zealand	South Africa	Sri Lanka	Wales
Nana Emile; Ngatokoa John; Tania Kermode; Natasha Marurai; Angela Maoate; Alexandria Nicholas; Darlene Nicholas; Puia Ngere; Puretu Piri; Anna Raina; Taromi Urirau; Raera Vano; Taina White	Peace Chawinga; Ruth Kaipa; Edith Kaliati; Judith Kayira; Sylvia Malenga; Eleanor Mapulanga; Connie Mhone; Future Mtegha; Esther Nkhoma; Emily Nyanga; Grace Phiri; Mary Waya	Anna Rowberry; Belinda Blair; Belinda Colling (c); Bernice Mene; Donna Loffhagen; Joanne Steed; Julie Dawson; Lesley Nicol; Linda Vagana; Lorna Suafoa; Noeline Taurua; Sonya Hardcastle	Marilyn Agliotti; Patricia Basson; Kerry Bee; Bronwyn Bock; Florinda Brand; Pietie Coetzee; Dominique Harverson; Annie Kloppers; Desmarie Kotze; Manzo Machago; Rosina Mogale; Desree Neville; Lana van der Westhuizen; Irene van Dyk; Letitia Vorster	Harshanie Arachchige; Rathna Arachchige; Somitha Arachchige; Dilani Arachchilage; Deepi Nalika Prasadi Pitiyage Don; Manoji Galhenage; Nazleen Hassim; Arunika Karawitage; Jayanthi Somasekaram De Silva; Deepthi Rupasinghe	Janet Allen; Ceri Battle; Dawn Donovan; Mair Evans; Clare Hawkins; Kara Jackson; Claire Kendrick; Elizabeth Rees; Pamela Walker; Helen Weston
Head Coach:	Head Coach: Griffin Saenda	Head Coach: Yvonne Willering	Head Coach:	Head Coach:	Head Coach:
Assistant coach:	Manager: Margaret Kadangwe	Manager: Sheryl Wells	Assistant coach:	Assistant coach:	Manager: Ann Handley
