= Ancaster—Dundas—Flamborough—Aldershot (provincial electoral district) =

Former provincial electoral district in Ontario, Canada

Ancaster—Dundas—Flamborough—Aldershot was a provincial electoral district in southwestern Ontario, Canada, that elected one member of the Legislative Assembly of Ontario. It was created in 1999 from Wentworth North, Burlington South and Halton Centre. It was abolished in 2007 and redistributed into Ancaster—Dundas—Flamborough—Westdale, Burlington, Hamilton Centre, Hamilton Mountain and Niagara West—Glanbrook.

The riding included the municipalities of Ancaster, Dundas and Flamborough plus that part of Burlington south of a line going along King Road to the 403 to the QEW.

== Members of Provincial Parliament ==
This riding has elected the following members of the Legislative Assembly of Ontario:

1. Toni Skarica, Progressive Conservative (1999–2000)
2. Ted McMeekin, Liberal (2000–2007)

== Provincial election results ==
2003 Ontario general election
Party	Candidate	Votes	%	±%
Liberal	Ted McMeekin	23,045	47.53	–11.22
Progressive Conservative	Mark Mullins	18,141	37.42	+7.33
New Democratic	Kelly Hayes	5,666	11.69	+4.91
Green	Brian Elder Sullivan	903	1.86	–2.28
Family Coalition	Michael Trolly	434	0.90	–
Confederation of Regions	Richard Butson	293	0.60	–
Total valid votes		48,482	99.34	
Total rejected, unmarked and declined ballots		324	0.66	–0.35
Turnout		48,806	63.56	+17.41
Eligible voters		76,784		
Liberal hold		Swing		–9.27
Source: Elections Ontario

Ontario provincial by-election, September 7, 2000 Resignation of Toni Skarica on February 7, 2000
Party	Candidate	Votes	%	±%
Liberal	Ted McMeekin	19,916	58.75	+25.26
Progressive Conservative	Priscilla de Villiers	10,201	30.09	–27.98
New Democratic	Jessica Brennan	2,297	6.78	–1.66
Green	Mark Coakley	1,405	4.14	–
Independent	John Turmel	80	0.24	–
Total valid votes		33,899	98.99	
Total rejected, unmarked and declined ballots		347	1.01	–
Turnout		34,246	46.15	–
Eligible voters		74,198		
Liberal gain from Progressive Conservative		Swing		+26.62
Source: Elections Ontario

1999 Ontario general election: Wentworth—Burlington
Party	Candidate	Votes	%
Progressive Conservative	Toni Skarica	27,466	58.07
Liberal	Vicky Wylson-Sher	15,843	33.50
New Democratic	Jessica Brennan	3,990	8.44
Total valid votes		47,299	99.19
Total rejected, unmarked and declined ballots		384	0.81
Turnout		47,683	65.46
Eligible voters		72,844	
Progressive Conservative pickup new district.			
Source: Elections Ontario

== See also ==
- List of Ontario provincial electoral districts
- Canadian provincial electoral districts
