= Dean Wasson =

Canadian politician and public servant

Dean Albert Wasson (December 10, 1930 – March 25, 2024) was a politician and public servant in Ontario, Canada. He was a founding member of the Ontario Provincial Confederation of Regions Party (CoR), and leader of the party in the 1990 provincial election.

Wasson's family arrived in the Peterborough region in 1831. Before entering political life, he spent many years in volunteer positions in minor hockey and minor and senior lacrosse and church organizations. He also held many senior management positions in business and finance with a major corporation.

In 1991, Wasson testified before a provincial committee on bilingualism that the Canadian Charter of Rights should allow "cultural diversity by region". He also called for Ontario to promote the de-Confederation of Quebec from Canada in the event that a compromise on federal issues could not be reached, and spoke of the importance of English cultural heritage within Canada. Critics of the Ontario Confederation of Regions Party have argued that references to "English heritage" are code phrases for cultural intolerance, although the CoR denied this.

The national Confederation of Regions party was formed to promote western autonomy within Canada, and to oppose official bilingualism. The Ontario Party appeared shortly before the 1990 election, after a number of municipalities in the province declared themselves unilingually English, and the governing Ontario Liberal Party indicated that it was considering adopting official bilingualism as a policy for Ontario. The CoR was formed to address the perceived reverse discrimination inherent in government services through bilingualism.

The party's leadership and executive developed policy and promoted riding association development prior to the election. There is no evidence that Wasson played a major role in the provincial campaign. He received 1,586 votes in the riding of Peterborough, finishing fifth out of six candidates. The winner was Jenny Carter of the Ontario New Democratic Party.

Wasson was also a city councillor for Peterborough, Ontario City Council from 1993 to 1995. In 2002-03, he served as chairman of the Peterborough Flood Relief Committee, assisting those who lost property in a rainfall.

From 1995 to 2000 he was active in the Kawartha Food Share serving as its founding President, General Manager and warehouse manager. Kawartha Food Share collects and redistributes food to local food banks.
