= École secondaire Georges-P.-Vanier =

Location
- 100 North Macklin; Hamilton, Ontario, L8S 3S1; Canada
- 43.2659°N 79.8946°W

Information
- School type: High school
- School board: Viamonde
- School number: 907308
- Principal: Hermann Djieuga
- Grades: 7-12
- Enrollment: 198 (October 2005)
- Language: French
- Website: csviamonde.ca/ecoles/georgespvanier

École secondaire Georges-P.-Vanier is a French first language high school located in the Westdale Village district in Hamilton, Ontario, Canada. It serves the French language population of Brant, Haldimand, Norfolk, Halton, Hamilton-Wentworth, and Wellington counties.

The school has a theatre group, Les Petits Géants, that has won multiple awards at the Sears Theatre Festival. The theatre group had the honour of presenting its plays in St-Malo, France and in Sicily. Due to the retirement of Linda Simeoni in 2019, the group has disbanded.

École secondaire Georges-P.-Vanier celebrated its 50th anniversary in 2024.

== Replacement ==
In 2016, the Province of Ontario announced a $26 million for a new joint school board 800 student secondary school, replacing École secondaire Georges-P.-Vanier and Académie Catholique Mère-Teresa of the Conseil scolaire catholique MonAvenir. The delay in construction was due to the inability to find an ideal site. In 2024, ideal site in Ancaster was secured by the City of Hamilton and on February 25, 2026 a land swap between the school boards and the City was signed. Construction is due to start in the fall of 2026.

== Notable alumni ==
- Evan Bouchard
- Michelle Dubé
- Lisa Langlois
- Kristine Spekkens

== See also ==
- CSDCSO
- Georges Vanier
- Education in Ontario
- List of secondary schools in Ontario
