= The Westdale Theatre =

- Westdale Theatre's logo as of 2017
- Interactive map of the The Westdale Theatre area

General information
- Architectural style: Art-Deco style
- Location: Hamilton, Ontario, Canada, 1014 King Street West, Hamilton, Ontario, Canada
- Coordinates: 43.262371°N 79.905683°W
- Year built: 1935
- Opened: August 31, 1935
- Renovated: 2017
- Owner: The Westdale Group

Design and construction
- Architect: W. Bruce Riddell
- Main contractor: H. C. Gummo

Other information
- Seating capacity: Over 600 in 1935, 342 after 2017 renovation
- Public transit: Hamilton Street Railway: King at Marion - #1180 & #2749; Buses: 01, 05 and 51

Website
- https://www.thewestdale.ca/

The Westdale Theatre is a single-screen theatre in Hamilton, Ontario, Canada, built in 1935 and operated by the Westdale Cinema Group since 2017. The theatre is located in the heart of Westdale, Canada's first planned neighbourhood, and was the first theatre in Hamilton designed explicitly to show motion pictures with sound. The theatre operated from 1935 up until it was listed for sale in 2016, at which point the Westdale Cinema Group, a charitable corporation, was formed and fundraised to purchase the building and operate it as a community hub for film screenings, performances and exhibitions.

== History ==
=== Original Westdale Theatre (1935–2017) ===
Designed by architect W. Bruce Riddell, the Westdale Theatre was the first theatre in Hamilton constructed explicitly to show talkies, movies with sound. The land for the theatre was purchased by Westdale Theatres Ltd., owner and operator of the theatre, for $50,000 ($1.2 million CAD in 2025) in 1935.

The theatre featured a RCA photophone high fidelity sound system, a state of the art system for the time. There was a sound-proof crying room with speakers inside where parents could take their crying children and keep listening to the movie. The theatre also featured an air-conditioning system which made the theatre especially popular the following Summer in 1936, when the city of Hamilton experience a heatwave including the city's hottest day on record. The Westdale Theatre opened Saturday August 31, 1935, with an opening gala featuring a coloured Los Angelese travelogue, a Charley Chase comedy, and the first screening Dance Band (1935) in North America. According to a report the day after in The Hamilton Spectator, its opening had "all the splendour and magnificence of a Hollywood premiere" with a spotlight and red carpet on the sidewalk leading to the canopied entrance.

The Westdale held two daily screenings at 6:30 pm and 9:30 pm, as well as Saturday matinées starting at 10 am and continuing until 5 pm. Tickets cost $0.25 ($5.65 CAD in 2025) for adults and $0.10 ($2.26 CAD in 2025) for children, and $0.17 ($3.84 CAD in 2025) for adults on Saturdays.

Hamiltonian George E. King was president of Westdale Theatres Ltd. upon forming and the theatre's first manager was David S. Rubin, who previously managed the Rialto Theatre in Ottawa, Ontario. The first projectionist was Eddie Woodburn.

Just a few weeks after opening the Westdale filed for bankruptcy on October 31, 1935, and closed. The theatre was acquired by Plymouth Theatre Ltd. in November 1935 and was reopened a few weeks later in December with help from Columbia films. In January 1936 the theatre screened Go Into Your Dance (1935) and The Pursuit of Happiness (1934). That month the theatre also screened its first French language film for Hamilton's Francophone audiences with Julien Duvivier's Maria Chapdelaine (1934) and continued hosting weekly French film screenings.

Throughout the late 1930s the Westdale had weekly Thursday night talent shows, which often reached maximum capacity audiences. Acts included such talents "female impersonations", "talented whisters" and "piano accordianists." The Westdale turned over movies often, marquees from the time read films such as One in a Million and Three Smart Girls (1936).

During World War 2 the Westdale hosted many events to raise funds for the war effort, frequently partnering with Princess Marina chapter of I.O.D.E. to sell soda, host musical acts, collect supplies and create care boxes for servicemen. Theatre staff purchased victory bonds repeatedly throughout the war to fund the war efforts. The theatre also reduced ticket prices 20% for servicemen and "ladies accompanying the men." In May 1941 theatre manager David Rubin was called into service as a sub-lieutenant in the engineering branch of the Royal Canadian Volunteer Naval Reserve.

In September 1941 the Westdale was sold to John D. Rosefield for $50,000 ($947,701 CAD in 2025). His parents Marie and Louis Rosefield began sharing theatre management duties while John served in Canada's army during the Italian campaign.

On September 16, 1943, a gunman entered the manager's office close to midnight after the last screening and demanded all the cash in the safety deposit box at gunpoint, escaping with $528 ($9,463 CAD in 2025) in cash.

John Rosefield returned to Hamilton injured in June 1945 and began sharing theatre management responsibilities with his father after he was discharged.

The Westdale Theatre's façade and marquee showing The Return of Monte Cristo (1946) and Swiss Family Robinson (1940).

The theatre experienced success throughout the late 1940s and 1950s with the booming film industry.

The Sardo family acquired the Westdale in 1957 and continued its operations as a commercial theatre until 1979 when they sold it to Peter Sorokolit. As competition from multiplexes like Cineplex and Landmark moved into Hamilton, combined with increased maintenance costs for the decades-old building, the Westdale struck a deal with Famous Players to do its movie booking.

The Westdale was one of the only cinemas in Hamilton to screen John Schlesinger's World War 2 drama Yanks (1979) to commercial success as most other theatres, like the downtown Odeon, stopped screening it after a few weeks. At the Westdale it screened for 8 weeks and made a nice profit.

In spite of the competition from the multiplexes, the Westdale experienced many successful runs throughout the 1980s and 1990s. According to Ken Davies, who became manager in 1960, the theatre's best runs were The Rain Man (1988) with 15 weeks, followed by A Fish Called Wanda (1988) and Dead Poet's Society (1989). In 1994 the theatre experienced one of its most successful runs with Schindler's List (1993) screening for 11 weeks.

When Peter Sorokolit died in 2015 the theatre was listed for sale and the Westdale community feared the theatre would close. The Westdale Cinema Group was formed to purchase the theatre, which they did in 2017.

=== Revival by Westdale Cinema Group (2017–present) ===
After a community-led fundraiser garnered $4.5 million for renovations, the theatre re-opened on Valentine's Day in February 2019. The renovated theatre feature a reduced seating capacity of 342 new seats, new speakers, a new $40,000 digital projector and a modern heating and cooling system. Since reopening the Westdale has dedicated a lot of screentime to showcasing the film talent from Hamilton, both independent and mainstream.

On January 30, 2024, the Westdale premiered a locally produced documentary Steel Toe Boots and the Sauce (2024) about local highschool St. Mary's football team The Crusaders' unprecented 1992 championship season.

As part of Hamilton's Famous Hamiltonian contest, the Westdale screened Hamilton-born actress and Hollywood icon Florence Lawrence's classic silent film The Taming of the Shrew (1908) ahead of fellow Hamiltonian actor Martin Short's Three Amigos (1986).

On June 5, 2025, they screened Hamilton-born director Ivan Reitman's Meatballs (1979), the first Canadian film to be widely distributed in the US. Afterwards they hosted a panel discussion with several Hamiltonians including Len Blum and Daniel Goldberg (who co-wrote the screenplay with Janis Allen and Harold Ramis), actor Jack Blum, Torontonian actors Hadley Kay, Norma Dell'Agnese, Nova Scotian actor Michael Kirby and New York actress Kristine DeBell.

The theatre held a community fundraiser exactly 5 years later on February 14, 2025, to try and raise enough money to cover the $1.7 million debt remaining for the renovations.

== See also ==
- Cinema of Canada
- Hamilton, Ontario
- Westdale, Hamilton
- Revival house
