= Priscilla de Villiers =

Canadian politician

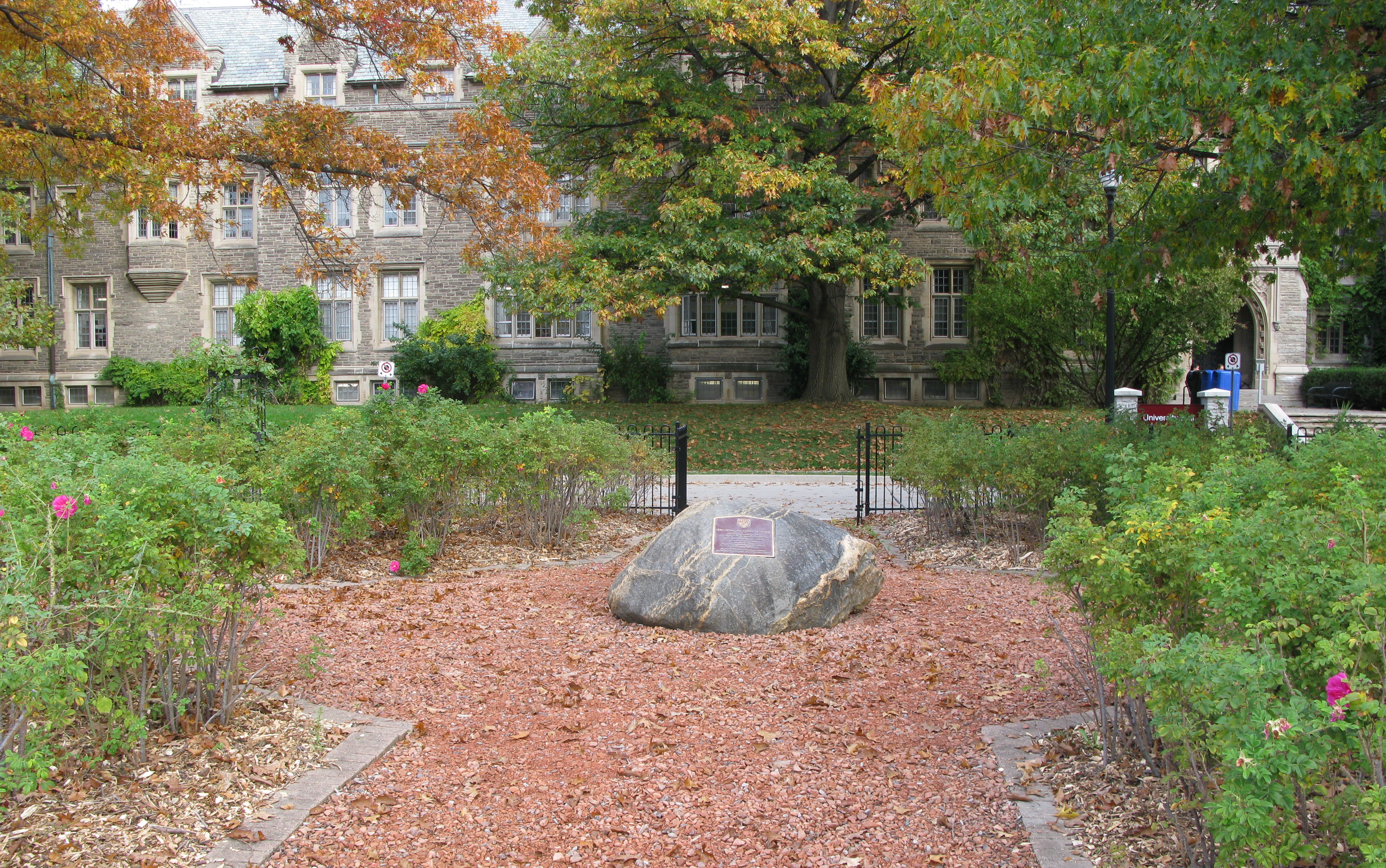
Nina de Villiers Garden at McMaster University

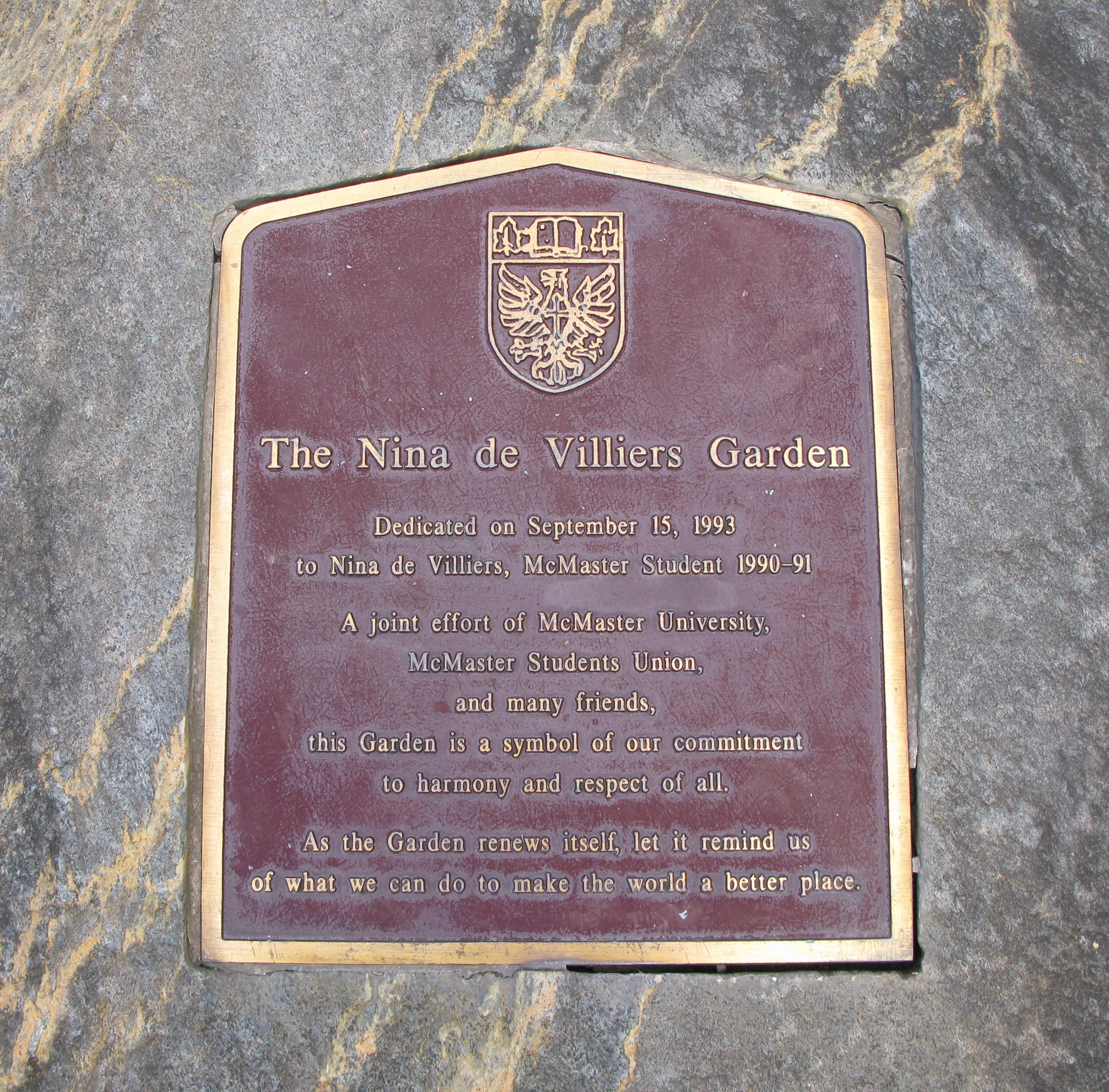
Memorial plaque in garden

Priscilla de Villiers is a Canadian activist, who was the founder and president of CAVEAT, an organization advocating governmental policy on crime.

== Biography ==
She was born in South Africa.

De Villiers is the mother of Nina de Villiers, a McMaster University student who was murdered on August 9, 1991 by Jonathon Yeo while jogging in Burlington, Ontario. Her killer had, according to CAVEAT's website, "a long history of violence."

This event prompted de Villiers to enter public life and found CAVEAT to lobby government policy to strengthen laws in the hopes of preventing similar incidents. CAVEAT, a not-for-profit charitable organization, was founded in June, 1992 and received its charitable designation in October, 1992.

In 1993, McMaster University created a memorial garden dedicated to Nina de Villiers on the university grounds, in front of University Hall.

In May, 1995, she received an honorary doctorate of law from McMaster University, Hamilton. In 2000 she ran in a by-election in the riding of Ancaster—Dundas—Flamborough—Aldershot for the Ontario PC Party, where she lost to Ontario Liberal Party candidate Ted McMeekin.

After that Ms. de Villiers was appointed Special Advisor to the Ontario Office for Victims of Crime where she continued to provide direct support to victims of crime and conduct research on issues that impact victimization. The research resulted in a report on the role of victims of crime in restorative justice in Ontario. Her appointment ended in January 2005.

In 2006 she was appointed to the Advisory Committee on Victim Issues to the Policy Centre on Victim Issues, Department of Justice, Canada.

In March 2007 Priscilla de Villiers was appointed as a member of the Ontario Office for Victims of Crime.

== Charity work ==
CAVEAT (Canadians Against Violence Everywhere Advocating for its Termination) was a Canadian lobby group which existed from 1991 to May 10, 2001, based in Burlington, Ontario. The organization advocated for a number of changes in government policy, particularly in promotion of tough-on-crime legislation and increased gun control. It was founded by Priscilla de Villiers in 1991, after her daughter Nina was murdered.

=== Archives ===
There is a Canadians Against Violence Everywhere Advocating for its Termination fond at Library and Archives Canada. The archival reference number is R9768. The fond covers the date range 1983-2001. It consists of 4.63 meters of textual records, and a number of other media records. It includes the following series of records: administrative files; conferences, workshop, forum files; correspondence files; funding and grants files; marketing and creative files; publication files; speaking engagement files; special project files.

== Official site ==
- CAVEAT
