= Flamborough—Glanbrook (provincial electoral district) =

Provincial electoral district in Ontario, Canada

Coordinates: 43.161°N 79.917°W

Ontario electoral district
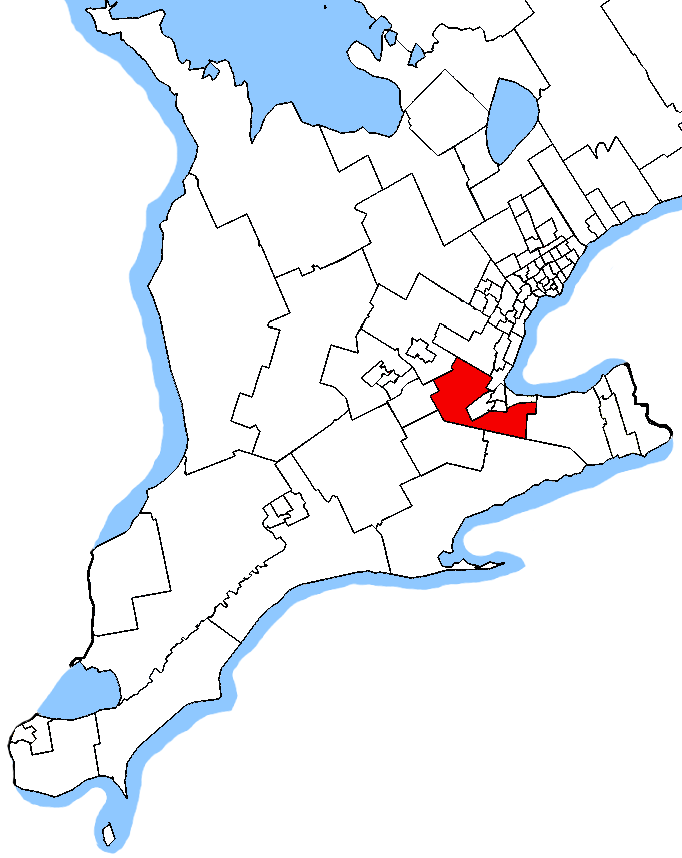

Provincial electoral district
- Legislature: Legislative Assembly of Ontario
MPP
Donna Skelly
Progressive Conservative
- District created: 2015
- First contested: 2018
- Last contested: 2025

Demographics
- Population (2016): 111,070
- Electors (2018): 86,027
- Area (km²): 899
- Pop. density (per km²): 123.5
- Census division: Hamilton
- Census subdivision: Hamilton

Flamborough—Glanbrook is a provincial electoral district in Ontario, Canada. It elects one member to the Legislative Assembly of Ontario. The riding was created in 2015.

== Members of Provincial Parliament ==
Flamborough—Glanbrook
Assembly	Years	Member	Party
Riding created from Ancaster—Dundas—Flamborough—Westdale, Hamilton Mountain and Niagara West—Glanbrook
42nd	2018–2022	Donna Skelly	Progressive Conservative
43rd	2022–present	Donna Skelly	Progressive Conservative

== Election results ==
Winning party in each polling division of Flamborough—Glanbrook at the 2025 Ontario general election

2025 Ontario general election
Party	Candidate	Votes	%	±%
Progressive Conservative	Donna Skelly	23,790	49.38	+3.18
Liberal	Joshua Bell	15,135	31.42	+11.01
New Democratic	Lilly Noble	6,095	12.65	–10.09
Green	Janet Errygers	1,923	3.99	–1.45
New Blue	Kristen Halfpenny	1,233	2.56	–0.84
Total valid votes		48,176	99.35	
Total rejected, unmarked and declined ballots		316	0.65	+0.10
Turnout		48,492	47.96	+1.05
Eligible voters		101,104		
Progressive Conservative hold		Swing		▼3.91
Source: Elections Ontario

Winning party in each polling division of Flamborough—Glanbrook at the 2022 Ontario general election

2022 Ontario general election
Party	Candidate	Votes	%	±%	Expenditures
Progressive Conservative	Donna Skelly	20,306	46.20	+2.68	$95,819
New Democratic	Allison Cillis	9,995	22.74	–11.43	$44,216
Liberal	Melisse Willems	8,970	20.41	+4.97	$22,601
Green	Mario Portak	2,392	5.44	+0.97	$0
New Blue	Paul Simoes	1,492	3.39	–	$0
Ontario Party	Walt Juchniewicz	710	1.62	–	$0
Populist	Nikita Mahood	86	0.20	–	$0
Total valid votes		43,951	99.45	–	$131,884
Total rejected, unmarked and declined ballots		242	0.55	–0.47	
Turnout		44,193	46.91	–13.67	
Eligible voters		94,203			
Progressive Conservative hold		Swing		▲7.05	
Source: Elections Ontario

2018 Ontario general election
Party	Candidate	Votes	%	±%	Expenditures
Progressive Conservative	Donna Skelly	22,454	43.53	+8.06	$29,992
New Democratic	Melissa McGlashan	17,630	34.17	+11.51	$390
Liberal	Judi Partridge	7,967	15.44	–20.14	$47,410
Green	Janet Errygers	2,307	4.47	–0.06	$81
Libertarian	Glenn Langton	541	1.05	–	none listed
None of the Above	Rudy Miller	451	0.87	–	$0
Trillium	Roman Sarachman	238	0.46	–	none listed
Total valid votes		51,588	98.98		
Total rejected, unmarked and declined ballots		531	1.02		
Turnout		52,119	60.58		
Eligible voters		86,027			
Progressive Conservative gain from Liberal		Swing		–1.68	
Source: Elections Ontario

2014 general election redistributed results
Party	Vote	%
Liberal	15,372	35.58
Progressive Conservative	15,325	35.47
New Democratic	9,791	22.66
Green	1,955	4.53
Others	758	1.76

== See also ==
- List of Ontario provincial electoral districts
- Canadian provincial electoral districts
