= Ted McMeekin =

Canadian politician (born 1948)

The Honourable Ted McMeekin ECO
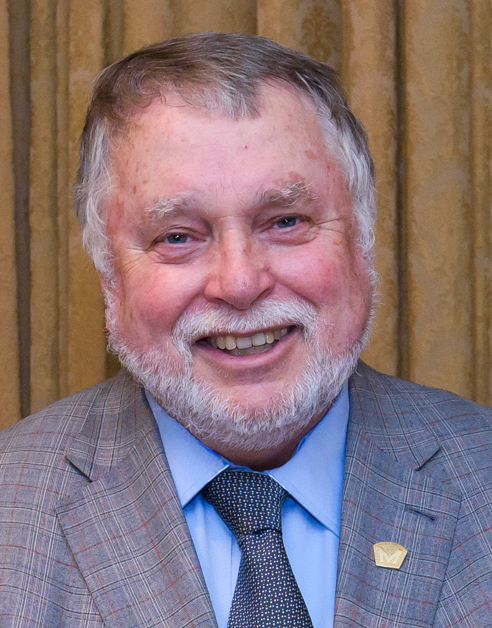
- McMeekin in 2016

Ontario MPP
- In office 2000–2018
- Preceded by: Toni Skarica
- Succeeded by: Sandy Shaw
- Constituency: Ancaster—Dundas—Flamborough—Westdale; Ancaster—Dundas—Flamborough—Aldershot (2000–2007)

Mayor of Flamborough
- In office 1994–2000
- Preceded by: Don Granger
- Succeeded by: Mark Shurvin

Hamilton City Council
- Incumbent
- Assumed office October 27, 2022
- Preceded by: Judi Partridge
- Constituency: Ward 15 (Flamborough)
- In office 1976–1980
- Preceded by: Bill Scandlan
- Succeeded by: Henry Merling, Jim Bethune, Bruce Charlton
- Constituency: Ward 7 (Hamilton Mountain)

Personal details
- Born: 1948 (age 77–78)
- Party: Liberal
- Occupation: Business owner

Ted McMeekin (born c. 1948) is a politician in Ontario, Canada. He is the Ward 15 Councillor, for the City of Hamilton. He was a Liberal member of the Legislative Assembly of Ontario from 2000 to 2018 who represented the ridings of Ancaster—Dundas—Flamborough—Westdale and Ancaster—Dundas—Flamborough—Aldershot. He served as a cabinet minister in the governments of Dalton McGuinty and Kathleen Wynne.

== Background ==
McMeekin completed his bachelor's degree in social work at McMaster University and his master's degree in social work from Wilfrid Laurier University. He has served as executive director of the Burlington Social Planning Council, and was for a time the chair of part-time studies at Mohawk College (where he also taught courses). He has also worked on social justice issues for the United Church of Canada, and was the owner and operator of a small bookstore for eight years.

== Municipal politics ==
Before entering provincial politics, McMeekin was a member of the Hamilton, Ontario City Council representing Ward 7 (Hamilton Mountain). After retiring from Council, he moved to Flamborough, Ontario, a rural community which lies on the outskirts of Hamilton, and later served a term of six years as mayor. McMeekin was also for a number of years Flamborough's representative on the Hamilton-Wentworth regional council, which the provincial government of Mike Harris eliminated in 2000 by amalgamating the city and outlying regions into a single political entity. McMeekin was one of the most vocal opponents of this change, noting that it would result in a loss of autonomy for Flamborough. On October 24, 2022, McMeekin returned to municipal politics, after winning a five person race to win a seat on Hamilton City Council in Ward 15.

== Provincial politics ==
McMeekin's plans to jump from municipal to provincial politics had been rumoured for years, and it came as no surprise when he won the Liberal nomination for a by-election to be held in ADFA on September 7, 2000 (called following the resignation of Member of Provincial Parliament (MPP) Toni Skarica, another vocal opponent of the amalgamation scheme). Although the seat had gone overwhelmingly for the Progressive Conservatives the previous year, McMeekin defeated PC candidate Priscilla de Villiers by over 9,000 votes. The Conservatives had spent $211,989 on his competitor, nearly $80,000 in excess of McMeekin's $132,143. Local opposition to amalgamation was generally cited as the reason for this shift.

In the provincial election of 2003, McMeekin defeated Tory candidate Mark Mullins by a somewhat reduced margin. He served as parliamentary assistant to John Gerretsen in his capacity as the minister responsible for seniors from October 23, 2003, to September 27, 2004. On September 27, 2004, he was appointed assistant to Jim Watson, the Ministry of Consumer and Business Services.

In the provincial election of 2007, McMeekin defeated Progressive Conservative candidate Chris Corrigan. On October 30, 2007, McMeekin was named a cabinet minister, responsible for Government and Consumer Services. He was re-elected in 2011 and appointed Minister of Agriculture, Food and Rural Affairs.

In 2013, McMeekin supported Kathleen Wynne in her bid to become Liberal leader. After Wynne won, she named McMeekin to her first cabinet as Minister of Community and Social Services.

McMeekin was re-elected in 2014. Shortly after the election, Wynne appointed McMeekin as Minister of Municipal Affairs and Housing. He resigned from his post in June 2016 to help create gender parity in the cabinet. McMeekin was defeated in the 2018 election, where he placed third.

=== Cabinet positions ===
Wynne ministry, Province of Ontario (2013–2018)
Cabinet posts (2)
Predecessor	Office	Successor
Bill Mauro	Minister of Municipal Affairs and Housing; 2014–2016	Bill Mauro (Note: Municipal Affairs); Chris Ballard (Note: Housing)
John Milloy	Minister of Community and Social Services; 2013–2014	Helena Jaczek
McGuinty ministry, Province of Ontario (2003–2013)
Cabinet posts (2)
Predecessor	Office	Successor
Carol Mitchell	Minister of Agriculture, Food and Rural Affairs; 2011–2013	Jeff Leal (Note: Minister of Agriculture and Food); Kathleen Wynne (Note: Minister of Rural Affairs)
Harinder Takhar	Minister of Consumer Services; 2007–2010	Sophia Aggelonitis

== Electoral record ==
2018 Ontario general election
Party	Candidate	Votes	%	±%
New Democratic	Sandy Shaw	23,921	43.19	+18.33
Progressive Conservative	Ben Levitt	17,189	31.03	+5.25
Liberal	Ted McMeekin	10,960	19.79	-23.42
Green	Peter Ormond	2,302	4.16	-0.77
None of the Above	Stephanie Davies	399	0.72	
Libertarian	Nicholas Dushko	372	0.67	
Independent	Jim Enos	247	0.45	
Total valid votes		55,390	99.10	
Total rejected, unmarked and declined ballots		505	0.90	
Turnout		55,895		
Eligible voters				
New Democratic gain from Liberal		Swing		+16.33
Source: Elections Ontario

2014 Ontario general election: Ancaster—Dundas—Flamborough—Westdale
Party	Candidate	Votes	%	±%
Liberal	Ted McMeekin	24,042	44.56	+0.86
Progressive Conservative	Donna Skelly	18,252	33.83	–0.75
New Democratic	Alex Johnstone	8,415	15.60	–1.60
Green	Raymond Dartsch	2,639	4.89	+1.91
Libertarian	Glenn Langton	423	0.78	+0.26
Freedom	Barry Spruce	188	0.35	+0.15
Total valid votes		53,959	98.48	
Total rejected, unmarked and declined ballots		835	1.52	+1.16
Turnout		54,794	59.02	+2.57
Eligible voters		92,833		
Liberal hold		Swing		+0.81
Source: Elections Ontario

2011 Ontario general election: Ancaster—Dundas—Flamborough—Westdale
Party	Candidate	Votes	%	±%
Liberal	Ted McMeekin	21,648	43.70	+2.53
Progressive Conservative	Donna Skelly	17,132	34.58	+0.17
New Democratic	Trevor Westerhoff	8,521	17.20	+3.48
Green	Erik Coverdale	1,477	2.98	–5.30
Family Coalition	Bob Maton	321	0.65	–0.46
Libertarian	Glenn Langton	258	0.52	+0.39
Freedom	Peter Melanson	99	0.20	–
Communist	Rick Gunderman Smith	87	0.18	–
Total valid votes		49,543	99.64	
Total rejected, unmarked and declined ballots		180	0.36	–0.16
Turnout		49,723	56.45	–1.67
Eligible voters		88,080		
Liberal hold		Swing		+1.18
Source: Elections Ontario

2007 Ontario general election
Party	Candidate	Votes	%	±%
Liberal	Ted McMeekin	20,525	41.5	
Progressive Conservative	Chris Corrigan	17,219	34.8	
New Democratic	Juanita Maldonado	6,542	13.2	
Green	David Januczkowski	4,243	8.6	
Family Coalition	Jim Enos	501	1.0	
Independent	Martin Zaliniak	219	0.4	
Confederation of Regions	Eileen Butson	129	0.3	
Libertarian	Sam Zaslavsky	65	0.1	

2003 Ontario general election
Party	Candidate	Votes	%	+/- (1999)	+/- (2000)
Liberal	Ted McMeekin	23,045	47.5	+14.0	-12.1
Progressive Conservative	Mark Mullins	18,141	37.4	-20.7	+6.9
New Democratic	Kelly Hayes	5,666	11.7	+2.3	+4.8
Green	Brian Elder Sullivan	903	1.9	-	-0.8
Family Coalition	Michael Trolly	434	0.9	–	–
Confederation of Regions	Richard Butson	293	0.6	–	–

By-election: February 7, 2000
Party	Candidate	Votes	%	+/-
Liberal	Ted McMeekin	19,916	59.6	+26.1
Progressive Conservative	Priscilla De Villiers	10,201	30.5	-27.6
New Democratic	Jessica Brennan	2,297	6.7	-1.5
Green	Mark Coakley	1,405	4.14	-
Independent	John Turmel	80	0.2	-
