= Ancaster—Dundas—Flamborough—Westdale (provincial electoral district) =

Coordinates: 43.2605°N 80.025°W

Ancaster—Dundas— Flamborough—Westdale
Ontario electoral district
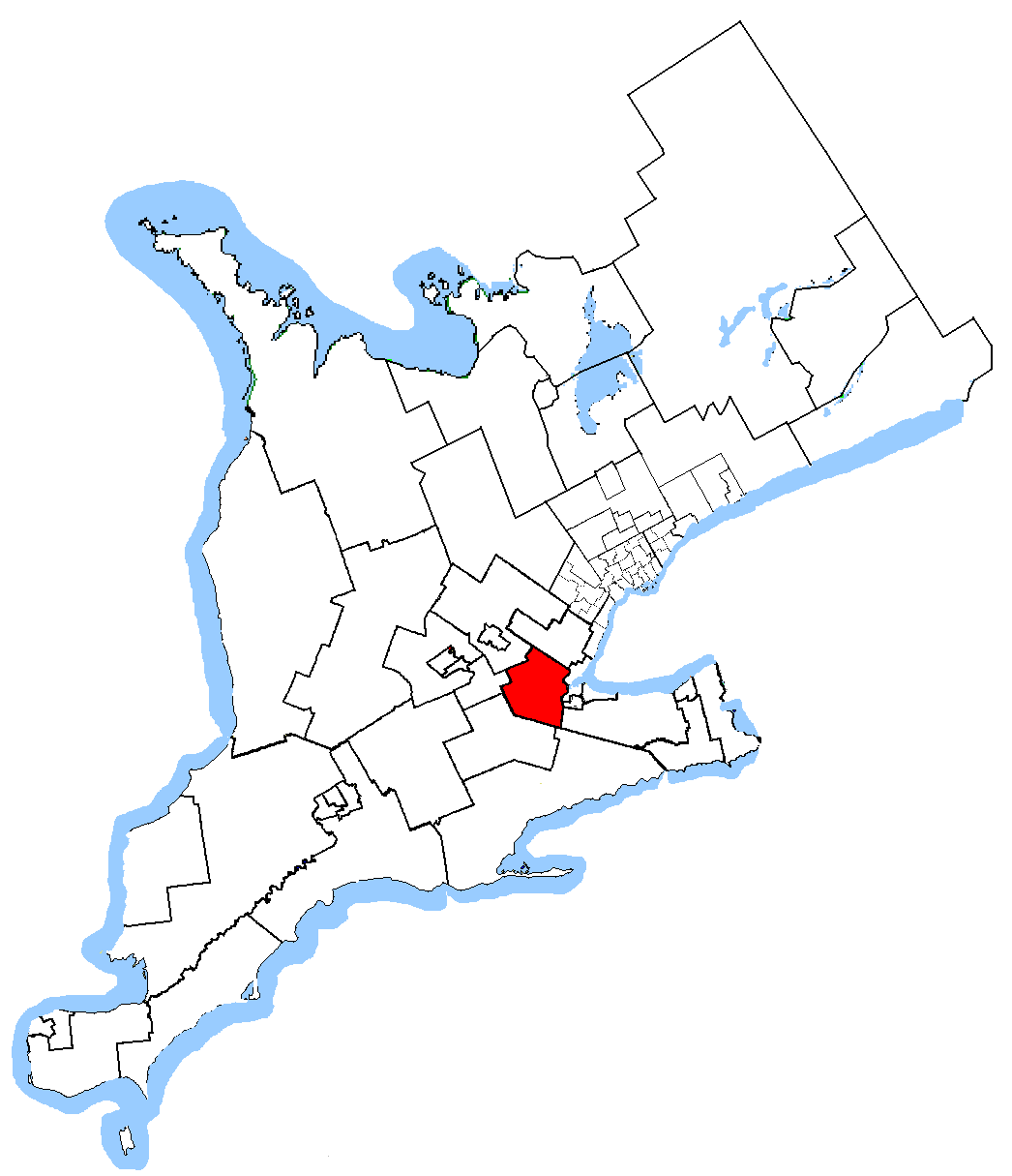
- Ancaster—Dundas—Flamborough—Westdale in relation to other southwestern Ontario electoral districts

Defunct provincial electoral district
- Legislature: Legislative Assembly of Ontario
- District created: 2004
- District abolished: 2015
- First contested: 2007
- Last contested: 2014

Demographics
- Population (2006): 111,844
- Electors (2007): 82,367
- Area (km²): 744
- Census division: Hamilton
- Census subdivision: Hamilton

Ancaster—Dundas—Flamborough—Westdale was a provincial electoral district in southwestern Ontario, Canada. It was created for the 2007 provincial election. 82.9% of the riding came from Ancaster—Dundas—Flamborough—Aldershot while 17.1% came from Hamilton West.

The riding included all of Hamilton west of a line running along Glancaster Road then to Garner Road then to a Hydroelectric Transmission Line then to Highway 403 to Hamilton Harbour.

In 2018, the district was dissolved into Hamilton West—Ancaster—Dundas and Flamborough—Glanbrook.

== Members of Provincial Parliament ==
Ancaster—Dundas—Flamborough—Westdale
Assembly	Years	Member	Party
Riding created from Hamilton West and Ancaster—Dundas—Flamborough—Aldershot
39th	2007–2011	Ted McMeekin	Liberal
40th	2011–2014	Ted McMeekin	Liberal
41st	2014–2018	Ted McMeekin	Liberal
Riding dissolved into Hamilton West—Ancaster—Dundas and Flamborough—Glanbrook

== Election results ==
2014 Ontario general election
Party	Candidate	Votes	%	±%
Liberal	Ted McMeekin	24,042	44.56	+0.86
Progressive Conservative	Donna Skelly	18,252	33.83	–0.75
New Democratic	Alex Johnstone	8,415	15.60	–1.60
Green	Raymond Dartsch	2,639	4.89	+1.91
Libertarian	Glenn Langton	423	0.78	+0.26
Freedom	Barry Spruce	188	0.35	+0.15
Total valid votes		53,959	98.48	
Total rejected, unmarked and declined ballots		835	1.52	+1.16
Turnout		54,794	59.02	+2.57
Eligible voters		92,833		
Liberal hold		Swing		+0.81
Source: Elections Ontario

2011 Ontario general election
Party	Candidate	Votes	%	±%
Liberal	Ted McMeekin	21,648	43.70	+2.53
Progressive Conservative	Donna Skelly	17,132	34.58	+0.17
New Democratic	Trevor Westerhoff	8,521	17.20	+3.48
Green	Erik Coverdale	1,477	2.98	–5.30
Family Coalition	Bob Maton	321	0.65	–0.46
Libertarian	Glenn Langton	258	0.52	+0.39
Freedom	Peter Melanson	99	0.20	–
Communist	Rick Gunderman Smith	87	0.18	–
Total valid votes		49,543	99.64	
Total rejected, unmarked and declined ballots		180	0.36	–0.16
Turnout		49,723	56.45	–1.67
Eligible voters		88,080		
Liberal hold		Swing		+1.18
Source: Elections Ontario

2007 Ontario general election
Party	Candidate	Votes	%
Liberal	Ted McMeekin	20,445	41.16
Progressive Conservative	Chris Corrigan	17,092	34.41
New Democratic	Juanita Maldonado	6,814	13.72
Green	David Januczkowski	4,112	8.28
Family Coalition	Jim Enos	548	1.10
Confederation of Regions	Eileen Butson	370	0.74
Independent	Martin Samuel Zuliniak	222	0.45
Libertarian	Sam Zaslavsky	67	0.13
Total valid votes		49,670	99.48
Total rejected, unmarked and declined ballots		262	0.52
Turnout		49,932	58.12
Eligible voters		85,910	
Liberal pickup new district.			
Source: Elections Ontario

== 2007 electoral reform referendum ==
2007 Ontario electoral reform referendum
Side	Votes	%
First Past the Post	30,716	63
Mixed member proportional	18,033	37
Total valid votes	48,749	100.0

== Sources ==
- Elections Ontario Past Election Results
