= Kristine Spekkens =

Canadian astronomer

- Born: Hamilton, Ontario, Canada
- Scientific career
- Fields: Extragalactic Astrophysics
- Workplaces: Queen's University
- Thesis: Testing Cold Dark Matter Paradigm Predictions with Disk Galaxy Dynamics
- Doctoral advisor: Ricardo Giovanelli
- Website: queensu.ca/physics/people-search/kristine-spekkens

Kristine Spekkens is a Canadian astronomer. She is a professor at Queen's University, and the Canadian Science Director for the Square Kilometre Array.

== Early life ==
Spekkens was born in Hamilton, Ontario and grew up in Burlington, Ontario, spending most of her summers in a small cottage community in Chelsea, Québec. She attended École primaire St-Phillippe and École secondaire Georges-P.-Vanier, and received her B.Sc. in Physics from Queen's University in 2000 and her PhD in astronomy from Cornell University in 2005.

An athlete growing up, Spekkens represented Canada at netball at the 1998 Commonwealth Games and at the 1999 World Netball Championships. She was also active in university athletics as a member of the Queen's Golden Gaels women's volleyball team from 1996 to 2000 and the Cornell University Wild Roses women's ultimate club from 2000-2005.

== Career ==
After finishing her PhD work, Spekkens received a prize Jansky Postdoctoral Fellowship at the National Radio Astronomy Observatory and Rutgers University. In 2008, she became an assistant professor in the Department of Physics and Space Science at the Royal Military College of Canada (RMC), where she was promoted to the rank of professor in 2020. In 2024, Spekkens became a professor in the Department of Physics, Engineering Physics and Astronomy at Queen's University, where she had been cross-appointed from RMC for over a decade.

Spekkens' research focuses on the structure and evolution of nearby galaxies. She leads a research group focussed on understanding the structure and evolution of nearby galaxies through deep multi-wavelength observations, and is particularly interested in using their atomic gas hydrogen line morphologies and kinematics as a cosmological probe. Spekkens is an active member of next-generation atomic gas survey teams on SKA precursor facilities, most notably the WALLABY survey on the ASKAP telescope within which she chairs a software development technical working group and sits on its executive committee.

Spekkens is the Canadian Science Director of the SKA, and in that role was a member of the Board of Directors of the SKA Organisation from 2019-2021, and is currently the Canadian member and Vice-Chair of the SKA Science and Engineering Advisory Committee. She has also held different positions within the Canadian astronomical community, including chairship of the Canadian Time Allocation Committee from 2014-2015, membership on the CASCA Board of Directors from 2016-2019, and chairship of the CASCA Equity and Inclusivity Committee (EIC). Spekkens is currently a member of the CASCA Nominating Committee.
