= Hamilton West—Ancaster—Dundas (provincial electoral district) =

Provincial electoral district in Ontario, Canada

Coordinates: 43.237°N 79.963°W

Ontario electoral district
- Hamilton West—Ancaster—Dundas in relation to other Hamilton districts

Provincial electoral district
- Legislature: Legislative Assembly of Ontario
MPP
Sandy Shaw
New Democratic
- District created: 2015
- First contested: 2018
- Last contested: 2025

Demographics
- Population (2016): 113,025
- Electors (2018): 89,782
- Area (km²): 105
- Pop. density (per km²): 1,076.4
- Census division: Hamilton
- Census subdivision: Hamilton

Hamilton West—Ancaster—Dundas is a provincial electoral district in Ontario, Canada. It elects one member to the Legislative Assembly of Ontario. This riding was created in 2015.

== Members of Provincial Parliament ==
Hamilton West—Ancaster—Dundas
Assembly	Years	Member	Party
Riding created from Ancaster—Dundas—Flamborough—Westdale, Hamilton Centre and Hamilton Mountain
42nd	2018–2022	Sandy Shaw	New Democratic
43rd	2022–2025	Sandy Shaw	New Democratic
44th	2025–present	Sandy Shaw	New Democratic

== Election results ==
Winning party in each polling division of Hamilton West—Ancaster—Dundas at the 2025 Ontario general election

2025 Ontario general election
Party	Candidate	Votes	%	±%	Expenditures
New Democratic	Sandy Shaw	19,684	38.87	–1.55	$81,681
Progressive Conservative	John Demik	16,766	33.11	+0.12	$63,030
Liberal	Julia Brown	11,543	22.80	+4.62	$15,045
Green	Guy Bisson	1,747	3.45	–1.92	$2,464
New Blue	Lee Weiss Vassor	587	1.16	–0.85	$0
None of the Above	Spencer Rocchi	229	0.45	–	$0
Electoral Reform	Nori Smith	81	0.16	–	$0
Total valid votes/expense limit		50,637	99.26	–	$156,534
Total rejected, unmarked and declined ballots		378	0.74	+0.09	
Turnout		51,015	52.47	+4.02	
Eligible voters		97,226			
New Democratic hold		Swing		–0.83	
Source: Elections Ontario

Winning party in each polling division of Hamilton West—Ancaster—Dundas at the 2022 Ontario general election

2022 Ontario general election
Party	Candidate	Votes	%	±%	Expenditures
New Democratic	Sandy Shaw	18,197	40.42	–2.76	$97,864
Progressive Conservative	Fred Bennink	14,852	32.99	+1.96	$53,993
Liberal	Shubha Sandill	8,184	18.18	–1.61	$33,543
Green	Syam Chandra	2,416	5.37	+1.21	$8,234
New Blue	Lee Weiss	904	2.01	–	$0
Ontario Party	Frank Thiessen	464	1.03	–	none listed
Total valid votes/expense limit		45,017	99.35		
Total rejected, unmarked and declined ballots		293	0.65	–0.26	
Turnout		45,310	48.45	–13.81	
Eligible voters		93,526			
New Democratic hold		Swing		▼2.36	
Source: Elections Ontario

2018 Ontario general election
Party	Candidate	Votes	%	Expenditures
New Democratic	Sandy Shaw	23,921	43.19	$31,707
Progressive Conservative	Ben Levitt	17,189	31.03	$51,726
Liberal	Ted McMeekin	10,960	19.79	$79,404
Green	Peter Ormond	2,302	4.16	$0
None of the Above	Stephanie Davies	399	0.72	$0
Libertarian	Nicholas Dushko	372	0.67	none listed
Independent	Jim Enos	247	0.45	none listed
Total valid votes/expense limit		55,390	99.10	
Total rejected, unmarked and declined ballots		505	0.90	
Turnout		55,895	62.26	
Eligible voters		89,782		
New Democratic pickup new district.				
Source: Elections Ontario

2014 general election redistributed results
Party	Vote	%
Liberal	20,760	43.21
Progressive Conservative	12,383	25.78
New Democratic	11,941	24.86
Green	2,368	4.93
Others	588	1.22

== See also ==
- List of Ontario provincial electoral districts
- Canadian provincial electoral districts
