= Richard Butson =

Chinese-born Canadian medic

Colonel Arthur Richard Cecil Butson, GC, OMM, CD (24 October 1922 – 24 March 2015) was born of British parents in China, and later emigrated to Canada.

A medical student during the Second World War, he then joined the Falkland Islands Dependencies Survey in 1946, and for rescuing another Antarctic explorer from a crevasse in 1947 was awarded the Albert Medal, then, with the George Cross, the highest award for civilian gallantry for British and Commonwealth citizens. Later, all holders of the Albert Medal were invited to exchange that medal for the George Cross.

From 1948 he undertook postgraduate medical research in London before moving to Canada where he continued his medical career, both in civilian practice and with the Canadian Militia.

== Early life and Antarctic ==
Butson was born in Hankou, China of British parents on 24 October 1922. He was educated in England at Leighton Park School and then at the University of Cambridge and University College Hospital, graduating MB, BChir in 1945.

He served in the Home Guard and a Light Rescue Squad in London during the Blitz and as a Medical Officer with the Falkland Islands Dependencies Survey in the Antarctic from 1946 to 1948. During his year in Antarctica, the expedition found a route for dog teams over the 5,000-foot high mountains of the Grahamland Peninsula and surveyed the last thousand miles of the most inaccessible coastline of the world.

For Bravery and Distinguished Service in Antarctica, Butson was awarded both the Albert Medal (later superseded by the George Cross) and the Polar Medal.

Butson's citation for the Albert Medal reads:

Whitehall, September 16, 1948.

The KING has been pleased to award the Albert Medal to Dr. Arthur Richard Cecil Butson, a member of the Falkland Islands Dependencies Survey, in recognition of his gallantry in the following circumstances. —

On the evening of 26th July 1947, an American member of the Ronne Antarctic Research Expedition fell into a crevasse some 6 miles from Base[.] Two teams were sent to the rescue but the hazards of crossing a heavily crevassed glacier were much increased by darkness and it was not until 4 o'clock on the morning of 27th July that the crevasse into which the American had fallen was located. Butson immediately volunteered to be lowered into the crevasse where he found the American tightly wedged 106 feet down and suffering from shock and exhaustion. For nearly an hour he had to chip the ice away in an extremely confined space in order to free the American, who was brought to the surface and placed inside a tent. Butson then rendered the necessary medical aid and at dawn a return to Base was made carrying the American on one of the sledges.

Butson's own description of events:

When I got down to Peterson, I found him so tightly wedged in the narrowing crevasse that I could not get down to his level without removing some of my clothes. His haversack was throttling him so I first had to cut the strap. He was wedged head down with his shoulders across the crevasse. I pulled his shoulders around so that freed his chest a little. I was then able to get two slings under his thighs. While doing all this there were loud cracks and booming noises from the glacier’s movement and I felt the pressure on myself of the glacial movement. Those above could not hear me well so when I asked them to pull a little I could not stop them when Peterson screamed. He suddenly shot up from the wedged position like a cork out of a champagne bottle. When nearly at the top it looked as he was falling out of the slings and was going to land back on me! He was, however, pulled out by those on top. I got out after the equipment had been hauled up. The miracle of the rescue was in finding the small hole in the crevasse bridge in a glacier 6 miles by 8 miles in the dark of Antarctic night. Peterson subsequently served in the US Marines in the Korean War. He died recently of cancer. His mother was grateful and sent me food parcels and wanted me to marry her daughter – there was a problem – I was already married!

== Canada ==
Butson did postgraduate surgical studies in London until 1952, when he emigrated to Canada, settling in Hamilton, Ontario in 1953, where he practiced as a surgeon. With the establishment of McMaster University Medical School in 1970, he joined the part-time faculty, ending with the appointment of Clinical Professor in the Department of Surgery. He was Chief of Staff of St. Joseph's Hospital, a 600-bed teaching hospital, for two years and Head of the Service of General Surgery for many years. He has published about 20 papers on surgical topics. He found time to obtain a Doctorate in addition to his medical degree.

Butson joined the Canadian Militia in 1956 as Medical Officer to the Royal Hamilton Light Infantry until 1972. He later commanded Hamilton's 23 Medical Company, with the rank of Lieutenant-Colonel. He was promoted Colonel and appointed the Area Surgeon for what is now LFCA (Land Force Central Area). Butson took the Arctic Winter Warfare course and qualified as a parachutist at age 55. He then established a Militia Airborne Surgical Team.

Butson was President of the Defence Medical Association of Canada and represented Canada medically on the NATO Reserve Officer's Association (CIOR) for four years. For his services to the Canadian Forces, he was appointed Honorary Surgeon to Her Majesty the Queen in 1977 and was made an Officer of the Order of Military Merit (Canada) in 1982.

Butson married Eileen Callon on 30 June 1967. They have two daughters, Sarah Louise and Caroline, and one son, Andrew Richard. Butson has been active with the St. John Ambulance for many years and was appointed Commander of the Venerable Order of Saint John on 14 April 2009.

He also received the Service Medal of the Order of St John for his long service with St John Ambulance.

A mountaineer, Butson climbed extensively in the Canadian Rockies, Baffin Island, the Antarctic, the Alps and the Hindu Kush in the Western Himalaya. Butson Ridge in Antarctica (at Lat 68°05’ S, Long 66°51’ W) is named after him.

In addition to the other medals mentioned above, Butson received the Defence Medal, the Queen Elizabeth II Silver Jubilee Medal in 1977, the Queen Elizabeth II Golden Jubilee Medal in 1992 (British and Canadian versions), and the Canadian Forces' Decoration with Bar.

He worked as a beef cattle farmer in Ancaster, Ontario.

== Politics ==
In 2003 Butson entered provincial politics in Ontario. Standing on principle, he stood as the sole candidate of the leaderless Confederation of Regions Party during the 2003 Ontario General Election. He stood Ancaster—Dundas—Flamborough—Aldershot, on a platform of individual freedom of responsibility, an affirmation of heritage, and a public referendum on bilingualism. He also opposed the forced amalgamation of Hamilton.

As his party's sole candidate, Butson was interviewed by the CBC's Avril Benoit during the campaign. He received only 293 votes, finishing last in a field of six candidates.

Considered the de facto leader of the party, he was elected party president the following year and remained so until 2010. The following year his wife was elected by the party membership as the president of the party, succeeding her husband for a one-year term.

== Private life ==
Buston was married twice. In 1946 he married Joyce Scott Cowell, with whom he had two children. In 1967 he married, Eileen Gallon and they had a son.

Butson died at the age of 92 on 24 March 2015.

== Medal entitlement ==
Butson was entitled to the following medals

| Ribbon | Description | Notes |
| | George Cross (GC) | 1948 |
| | Order of Military Merit (OMM) | Officer - 1982 |
| | Venerable Order of Saint John | Officer |
| | Defence Medal | |
| | Polar Medal | 1954 |
| | Queen Elizabeth II Silver Jubilee Medal | 1977 |
| | Canada 125 Medal | 1992 |
| | Queen Elizabeth II Golden Jubilee Medal | 2002 |
| | Queen Elizabeth II Diamond Jubilee Medal | 2012 |
| | Canadian Forces' Decoration (CD) | 22 years service with the Canadian Forces |
| | Service Medal of the Order of St John | |
