= CKWS =

CKWS may refer to:

- CKWS-TV, a television station (channel 11) licensed to Kingston, Ontario, Canada
- CKWS-FM, a radio station (104.3 FM) licensed to Kingston, Ontario, Canada, which originally held the call sign CKWS from 1942 to 1987, used the callsign CFFX in the interim
- CFMK-FM, a radio station (96.3 FM) licensed to Kingston, Ontario, Canada, which held the call sign CKWS-FM from 1947 to 1976
