= Toni Skarica =

Canadian politician and jurist

Ontario MPP
- In office 1999–2000
- Preceded by: New riding
- Succeeded by: Ted McMeekin
- Constituency: Wentworth—Burlington
- In office 1995–1999
- Preceded by: Don Abel
- Succeeded by: Riding abolished
- Constituency: Wentworth North

Personal details
- Born: England
- Party: Progressive Conservative
- Occupation: Lawyer

Antonio Peter "Toni" Skarica is a judge and former politician in Ontario, Canada. He was a Progressive Conservative member of the Legislative Assembly of Ontario from 1995 to 2000 who represented the Hamilton area ridings of Wentworth North and Wentworth—Burlington. In 2012 he was appointed as a judge to the Ontario Superior Court of Justice.

== Background ==
Skarica was born in England. Miroslav, his father was of Bosnian heritage while his mother, Hilda, came from Austria. The family moved to Canada when Skarica was five years old. He has a Bachelor of Commerce degree from McMaster University, and a law degree from the University of Toronto. He was called to the bar in 1979 and worked in private practice and as a Crown attorney. He is married with two children.

== Politics ==
Skarica was elected to the Ontario legislature in the 1995 provincial election, defeating Liberal Chris Ward and New Democratic Party incumbent Don Abel by a significant margin in the suburban Hamilton riding of Wentworth North. He was not appointed to cabinet under Mike Harris, and soon developed a reputation as a maverick within his party. He opposed school board amalgamation and told regional officials to refuse payment of social housing costs being downloaded by the province. He also opposed the Harris government's plans to amalgamate the City of Hamilton with neighbouring municipalities.

Skarica was re-elected in the provincial election of 1999, in the redistributed riding of Wentworth—Burlington. During the election, he promised to resign if he was unable to prevent the amalgamation of Ancaster, Dundas and Flamborough into the City of Hamilton. The Harris government pushed forward with its amalgamation plans at the end of 1999, and Skarica resigned from the legislature on February 7, 2000.

== Later life ==
After leaving office, Skarica went back to work as assistant Crown attorney serving Hamilton, Ontario. On November 1, 2012, he was appointed as a judge to the Ontario Superior Court of Justice.
