= Ontario Provincial Confederation of Regions Party =

- Defunct provincial party
- Leader: Murray Reid (de facto)
- President: Murray Reid
- Founded: April 26, 1989
- Dissolved: February 2025
- Headquarters: 274 Stone Road; RR 2 Renfrew, Ontario
- Ideology: Conservatism; Canadian nationalism; anti-bilingualism
- Colours: Green, yellow
- Seats in Legislature: 0

Website
- sites.google.com/site/ontariocorparty/

The Ontario Provincial Confederation of Regions Party was a minor political party in Ontario, Canada. It was the provincial branch of the now-defunct Confederation of Regions Party of Canada. The party was founded in 1989, around the time the federal CoR was dissolved, and it remained the last Confederation of Regions Party in Canada until 2025, when it was deregistered.

The CoR survived only in Ontario. However, it was once a national movement whose original raison d'être was to promote the rights of regions other than Ontario and Quebec, it later advocated for regions within Ontario. It has reinvented itself twice: in the 1990s, first in campaigning across mainly rural regions of Ontario with targeted policies, before in the 2000s finding resonance in Northern Ontario and Northeastern Ontario, where it continued to play a minor role in provincial elections.

== Party platform ==
The party campaigned on the promotion of direct democracy, protection of Canadian heritage and environmental sustainability, while opposing urban sprawl onto farmland, big business and unionization. The party's proposed health care plan would "give individuals more responsibility over their own health care", however, it would not support a two-tier health care system.

If elected, the party would hold a referendum on the French Language Services Act and halt all multicultural funding.

== Election results ==
Results of recent elections for the Legislative Assembly of Ontario:

Election results
Election year	No. of overall votes	% of overall total	No. of candidates run	No. of seats won	+/−	Government
1990	75,873	1.89	33	0 / 130	New Party	Extra-parliamentary
1995	3,971	0.10	6	0 / 130	=	Extra-parliamentary
1999	282	0.01	2	0 / 103	=	Extra-parliamentary
2003	293	0.01	1	0 / 103	=	Extra-parliamentary
2007	446	0.01	2	0 / 107	=	Extra-parliamentary
2011	559	0.01	3	0 / 107	=	Extra-parliamentary
2014	549	0.01	2	0 / 107	=	Extra-parliamentary
2018	386	0.01	2	0 / 124	=	Extra-parliamentary
2022	414	0.01	3	0 / 124	=	Extra-parliamentary

In the 1990 election, CoR candidates in Algoma, Cochrane South, Nickel Belt, Sudbury, Sudbury East and Sault Ste. Marie placed ahead of Ontario Progressive Conservative Party candidates. The party rapidly declined in popularity, receiving about 0.1% with only six candidates province-wide vote in 1995, and then less than 0.01% of the province wide popular vote in the two registered candidate 1999, one registered candidate 2003, two registered candidate 2007, three registered candidate 2011, two registered candidate 2014 and the two registered candidate 2018 elections.

Typical of that 1999-2018 era was the 2014 General Election. The party was only able to field two candidates in the 2014 election. Fauzia Sadiq, the party's candidate in Timmins—James Bay campaigned on a platform of eliminating property taxes, cutting government positions and introducing two-year term limits. Sadiq received 61 votes. The party's only other candidate was long-time candidate and party president Murray Reid in Renfrew—Nipissing—Pembroke who received 490 votes.

However, heading towards the June 2nd, 2022, General Election in the Province of Ontario, of the province's 124 constituencies, the party has three organized constituency associations and all three associations are offering candidates for this 2022 election, according to Elections Ontario. That same election administration body reports that the coming June 2022 will feature 26 registered political parties of which four parties are seen as "major" parties. Thus of the remaining 22 "minor" parties, according to Elections Ontario data, as a "minor" party, CoR is able to maintain more organized constituency associations than 12 of those 22 "minor" parties, thus making CoR a "Top Half" "minor" party, organization-wise, in the province.

The party failed to win any seats in the 2022 Ontario general election.

== Party leaders ==
Dean Wasson had been the party's only leader, heading the party in the 1990 election. The party did not field a leader in any subsequent election, considering itself to be a grass roots organization, and would only choose a leader if the party won seats. The party's one candidate nominated in the 2003 election, Richard Butson, was cited as the de facto leader. After Butson's death in 2015, Eileen Butson was named as president of the party. In 2018, Murray Reid became the de facto leader of the party and president. He held these roles until the party dissolved in 2025.

== See also ==
- Ontario Provincial Confederation of Regions Party official website
