= Sandy Shaw (politician) =

Canadian politician

Sandy Shaw MPP
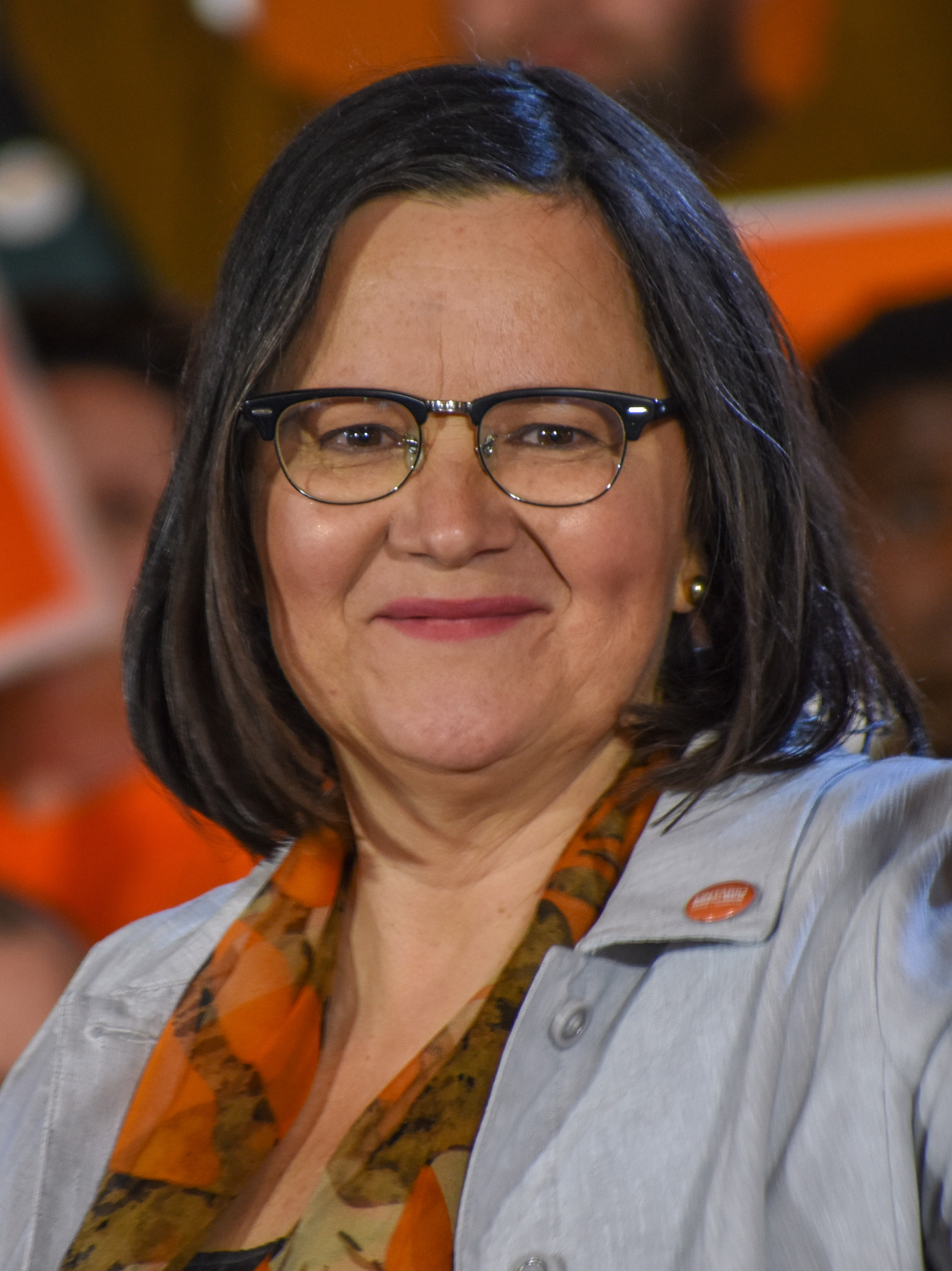
- Shaw in 2018

Official Opposition Critic for Environment, Conservation and Parks
- Incumbent
- Assumed office February 2, 2021
- Leader: Marit Stiles

Official Opposition Critic for Finance and Treasury Board
- In office August 23, 2018 – February 2, 2021
- Leader: Andrea Horwath

Member of the Ontario Provincial Parliament for Hamilton West—Ancaster—Dundas
- Incumbent
- Assumed office June 7, 2018
- Preceded by: Riding established

Personal details
- Born: October 22, 1960 (age 65)
- Party: New Democratic
- Occupation: Director of the Hamilton Port Authority; Director of Corporate and Social Responsibility First Ontario Credit Union

Sandy Shaw MPP is a Canadian politician who was elected to the Legislative Assembly of Ontario in the 2018 provincial election. She represents the riding of Hamilton West—Ancaster—Dundas as a member of the Ontario New Democratic Party. Sandy currently serves as the Critic for Environment, Conservation and Parks.

She was previously married to rock musician Tom Wilson, with whom she has two children. Despite the end of their marriage, the two remained friends, with Wilson having performed at campaign fundraisers for Shaw when she began her political career on Hamilton City Council in the 2010s.

== Electoral record ==
2025 Ontario general election: Hamilton West—Ancaster—Dundas
Party	Candidate	Votes	%	±%	Expenditures
New Democratic	Sandy Shaw	19,684	38.87	–1.55	$81,681
Progressive Conservative	John Demik	16,766	33.11	+0.12	$63,030
Liberal	Julia Brown	11,543	22.80	+4.62	$15,045
Green	Guy Bisson	1,747	3.45	–1.92	$2,464
New Blue	Lee Weiss Vassor	587	1.16	–0.85	$0
None of the Above	Spencer Rocchi	229	0.45	N/A	$0
Electoral Reform	Nori Smith	81	0.16	N/A	$0
Total valid votes/expense limit		50,637	98.76	–0.59	$156,534
Total rejected, unmarked, and declined ballots		636	1.24	+0.59	
Turnout		51,273	53.84	+5.39	
Eligible voters		95,229			
New Democratic hold		Swing		–0.84	
Source: Elections Ontario

2022 Ontario general election: Hamilton West—Ancaster—Dundas
Party	Candidate	Votes	%	±%	Expenditures
New Democratic	Sandy Shaw	18,197	40.42	−2.76	$97,864
Progressive Conservative	Fred Bennink	14,852	32.99	+1.96	$53,993
Liberal	Shubha Sandill	8,184	18.18	−1.61	$33,543
Green	Syam Chandra	2,416	5.37	+1.21	$8,234
New Blue	Lee Weiss	904	2.01	N/A	$0
Ontario Party	Frank Thiessen	464	1.03	N/A	none listed
Total valid votes		45,017	99.35	+0.25	
Total rejected, unmarked, and declined ballots		293	0.65	–0.25	
Turnout		45,310	48.45	–13.81	
Eligible voters		92,965			
New Democratic hold		Swing		−2.36	
Source: Elections Ontario

2018 Ontario general election: Hamilton West—Ancaster—Dundas
Party	Candidate	Votes	%	±%
New Democratic	Sandy Shaw	23,921	43.19	+18.33
Progressive Conservative	Ben Levitt	17,189	31.03	+5.25
Liberal	Ted McMeekin	10,960	19.79	-23.42
Green	Peter Ormond	2,302	4.16	-0.77
None of the Above	Stephanie Davies	399	0.72	
Libertarian	Nicholas Dushko	372	0.67	
Independent	Jim Enos	247	0.45	
Total valid votes		55,390	99.10	
Total rejected, unmarked and declined ballots		505	0.90	
Turnout		55,895	62.26	
Eligible voters		89,782		
New Democratic pickup new district.				
Source: Elections Ontario

Candidates for the October 27, 2014 Hamilton, Ontario Ward One Councillor Election
Candidate	Popular vote			Expenditures
Candidate	Votes	%	±%	Expenditures
Aidan Johnson	3,030	34.69%	–	$20,215.71
Sandy Shaw	2,390	27.36%	–	$21,412.40
Jason Allen	1,050	12.02%	–	$9,286.10
Tony Greco	1,024	11.72%	−14.7%	n/a^{1}
Brian Lewis	641	7.34%	–	$9,101.20
Ira Rosen	600	6.87%	–	$14,583.76
Total votes	8,870	40.74%	+.04%	
Registered voters	21,770	100%		
^{1} These candidates did not submit official Financial Statements and are, therefore, ineligible to run in the 2018 Municipal election Note: All Hamilton Municipal Elections are officially non-partisan. Note: Candidate campaign colours are based on the prominent colour used in campaign items (signs, literature, etc.) and are used as a visual differentiation between candidates.
Sources: City of Hamilton, "Nominated Candidates" Archived 2010-08-20 at the Wayback Machine
