= Bill Grimmett =

Canadian politician

Ontario MPP
- In office 1995–1999
- Preceded by: Dan Waters
- Succeeded by: Riding abolished
- Constituency: Muskoka—Georgian Bay

Personal details
- Born: October 4, 1956 (age 69) Aurora, Ontario
- Party: Progressive Conservative
- Occupation: Lawyer

William Lawrence Grimmett (born October 4, 1956) is a former politician in Ontario, Canada. He was a Progressive Conservative member of the Legislative Assembly of Ontario from 1995 to 1999.

== Background ==
Grimmett has a Bachelor of Arts degree from Trent University (1978) and a law degree from the University of Toronto (1981). He worked as a lawyer in Port Carling from 1983 to 1995, and was a trustee on the Muskoka Board of Education from 1991 to 1995. He was elected to the Provincial Assembly in 1995 under Premier Mike Harris. Grimmett returned to his Port Carling law practice in 1999 where he remains to this day.

== Politics ==
He was elected to the Ontario legislature in the 1995 provincial election, defeating Liberal Ken Black and incumbent New Democrat Dan Waters by about 10,000 votes in the riding of Muskoka–Georgian Bay. He served as a backbench supporter of Mike Harris's government for the next four years.

In the late 1990s, Grimmett introduced legislation that would suspend the driver's licences of people convicted of impaired boating. The legislation enjoyed all-party support and was passed unanimously at both first and second reading. However, the bill was never called for third and final reading by the government and it died on the Order Paper. In the years after Grimmett left Queen's Park this same legislation would be introduced again and ultimately passed into law.

Beginning in late 1995, Grimmett and fellow MPP Bob Wood led the Government Task Force on Agencies, Boards and Commissions, examining the role and viability of these bodies in Ontario. The Task Force delivered a series of recommendations that were to form the basis for future agency reform in the province.

Grimmett also worked on the early development of ServiceOntario. This initiative, which has since been implemented, was designed to improve customer service in the Ontario Government and make it easier for the public to access information, services and resources.

In 1997, Grimmett oversaw public consultations on reforms to Ontario's Pension Benefits Act.

In 1996, the Harris government reduced the number of provincial ridings from 130 to 103. This change meant that a number of sitting MPPs had to compete against one another for re-nomination and re-election. Deputy Premier Ernie Eves Parry Sound riding and Grimmett's riding were merged into the new Parry Sound/Muskoka riding. Grimmett did not oppose Eves, and returned to his Port Carling law practice after the 1999 provincial election, having chaired Ernie Eves' successful campaign in the newly configured Parry Sound-Muskoka riding.
