= Parry Sound (provincial electoral district) =

Ontario electoral district

Defunct provincial electoral district
- Legislature: Legislative Assembly of Ontario
- District created: 1886
- District abolished: 1996
- First contested: 1886
- Last contested: 1995

Parry Sound was an electoral riding in Ontario, Canada. It was created in 1886 when the riding of Muskoka and Parry Sound was split two ridings: Muskoka and Parry Sound. It was abolished in 1999 when it was merged into the riding of Parry Sound—Muskoka.

== Members of Provincial Parliament ==
Parry Sound
Assembly	Years	Member	Party
6th	1886–1890	Samuel Armstrong	Independent
7th	1890–1894	James Sharpe	Liberal
8th	1894–1898	William Rabb Beatty	Patrons of Industry
9th	1898–1902	William Rabb Beatty	Patrons of Industry
10th	1902–1904	Joseph Milton Carr	Liberal
11th	1905–1908	John Galna	Conservative
12th	1908–1911	John Galna	Conservative
13th	1911–1914	John Galna	Conservative
14th	1914–1919	Joseph Edgar	Conservative
15th	1919–1923	Richard Reese Hall	Liberal
16th	1923–1926	George Vernon Harcourt	Conservative
17th	1926–1929	George Vernon Harcourt	Conservative
18th	1929–1934	George Vernon Harcourt	Conservative
19th	1934–1937	Milton Taylor Armstrong	Liberal
20th	1937–1943	Milton Taylor Armstrong	Liberal
21st	1943–1945	Elmer Roy Smith	Co-operative Commonwealth
22nd	1945–1948	Milton Taylor Armstrong	Liberal
23rd	1948–1948	Charles Wilson Cragg	Progressive Conservative
23rd	1948–1951	Allister Johnston	Progressive Conservative
24th	1951–1955	Allister Johnston	Progressive Conservative
25th	1955–1959	Allister Johnston	Progressive Conservative
26th	1959–1963	Allister Johnston	Progressive Conservative
27th	1963–1967	Allister Johnston	Progressive Conservative
28th	1967–1971	Allister Johnston	Progressive Conservative
29th	1971–1975	Lorne Maeck	Progressive Conservative
30th	1975–1977	Lorne Maeck	Progressive Conservative
31st	1977–1981	Lorne Maeck	Progressive Conservative
32nd	1981–1985	Ernie Eves	Progressive Conservative
33rd	1985–1987	Ernie Eves	Progressive Conservative
34th	1987–1990	Ernie Eves	Progressive Conservative
35th	1990–1995	Ernie Eves	Progressive Conservative
36th	1995–1999	Ernie Eves	Progressive Conservative
Sourced from the Ontario Legislative Assembly
Merged into Parry Sound—Muskoka before the 1999 election

== Election results ==
1995 Ontario general election
Party	Candidate	Votes	%	±%
Progressive Conservative	Ernie Eves	15,523	65.47	+21.69
Liberal	Mark Fisher	4,821	20.33	–1.93
New Democratic	Dan Reed	3,367	14.20	+1.20
Total valid votes		23,711	99.48	
Total rejected, unmarked and declined ballots		123	0.52	–0.18
Turnout		23,834	63.57	–1.52
Eligible voters		37,494		
Progressive Conservative hold		Swing		+11.81
Source: Elections Ontario

1990 Ontario general election
Party	Candidate	Votes	%	±%
Progressive Conservative	Ernie Eves	10,078	43.78	–9.81
Liberal	Randy Sheppard	5,125	22.26	–10.53
Green	Richard Thomas	4,061	17.64	–
New Democratic	Joe Boissonneault	2,993	13.00	+2.45
Family Coalition	Julia Duggan	763	3.31	+0.25
Total valid votes		23,020	99.30	
Total rejected, unmarked and declined ballots		162	0.70	+0.34
Turnout		23,182	65.09	+0.87
Eligible voters		35,616		
Progressive Conservative hold		Swing		+0.36
Source: Elections Ontario

1987 Ontario general election
Party	Candidate	Votes	%	±%
Progressive Conservative	Ernie Eves	11,332	53.59	+3.06
Liberal	Rollie Boissonneault	6,935	32.80	–11.43
New Democratic	Bill Pabst	2,231	10.55	+5.31
Family Coalition	Warren Joseph Edgar	647	3.06	–
Total valid votes		21,145	99.64	
Total rejected ballots		77	0.36	+0.01
Turnout		21,222	64.22	–5.28
Eligible voters		33,046		
Progressive Conservative hold		Swing		+7.25
Source: Elections Ontario

1985 Ontario general election
Party	Candidate	Votes	%	±%
Progressive Conservative	Ernie Eves	10,904	50.53	+4.26
Liberal	Richard Thomas	9,544	44.23	–2.01
New Democratic	Leo Gagne	1,130	5.24	–2.25
Total valid votes		21,578	99.65	
Total rejected ballots		76	0.35	–0.10
Turnout		21,654	69.50	+2.68
Eligible voters		31,155		
Progressive Conservative hold		Swing		+3.14
Source: Elections Ontario

1981 Ontario general election
Party	Candidate	Votes	%	±%
Progressive Conservative	Ernie Eves	8,955	46.27	–3.39
Liberal	Richard Thomas	8,949	46.24	+8.68
New Democratic	Arthur Davis	1,448	7.48	–5.29
Total valid votes		19,352	99.55	
Total rejected ballots		87	0.45	+0.12
Turnout		19,439	66.82	–3.62
Eligible voters		29,091		
Progressive Conservative hold		Swing		–6.03
Source: Elections Ontario

1977 Ontario general election
Party	Candidate	Votes	%	±%
Progressive Conservative	Lorne Maeck	9,929	49.66	+5.11
Liberal	Ed Fisher	7,510	37.57	–1.72
New Democratic	Ray Smith	2,553	12.77	–3.39
Total valid votes		19,992	99.68	
Total rejected ballots		65	0.32	+0.01
Turnout		20,057	70.44	+3.71
Eligible voters		28,474		
Progressive Conservative hold		Swing		+3.41
Source: Elections Ontario

1975 Ontario general election
Party	Candidate	Votes	%	±%
Progressive Conservative	Lorne Maeck	8,154	44.56	+7.21
Liberal	Ed Fisher	7,188	39.28	+18.25
New Democratic	Larry Labine	2,957	16.16	–0.31
Total valid votes		18,299	99.69	
Total rejected ballots		57	0.31	–0.69
Turnout		18,356	66.73	–7.85
Eligible voters		27,506		
Progressive Conservative hold		Swing		–5.52
Source: Elections Ontario

1971 Ontario general election
Party	Candidate	Votes	%	±%
Progressive Conservative	Lorne Maeck	6,682	37.35	–18.80
Independent	Royce Macklaim	4,498	25.14	–
Liberal	Lorne Conrad	3,763	21.03	–15.03
New Democratic	Larry Labine	2,947	16.47	+8.69
Total valid votes		17,890	99.00	
Total rejected ballots		181	1.00	+0.62
Turnout		18,071	74.58	+6.99
Eligible voters		24,229		
Progressive Conservative hold		Swing		–9.40
Source: Elections Ontario

1967 Ontario general election
Party	Candidate	Votes	%	±%
Progressive Conservative	Allister Johnston	7,813	56.15	+2.33
Liberal	Max Paul	5,019	36.07	–3.51
New Democratic	J. B. Mick	1,083	7.78	+1.18
Total valid votes		13,915	99.61	
Total rejected ballots		54	0.39	–0.38
Turnout		13,969	67.60	–5.46
Eligible voters		20,665		
Progressive Conservative hold		Swing		+2.92
Source: Elections Ontario

1963 Ontario general election
Party	Candidate	Votes	%	±%
Progressive Conservative	Allister Johnston	6,414	53.81	–4.00
Liberal	Wilfred McDonald	4,718	39.58	+8.68
New Democratic	Dorothy Sleeth	787	6.60	–4.68
Total valid votes		11,919	99.23	
Total rejected ballots		92	0.77	–0.06
Turnout		12,011	73.06	+1.87
Eligible voters		16,440		
Progressive Conservative hold		Swing		–6.34
Source: Elections Ontario

1959 Ontario general election
Party	Candidate	Votes	%	±%
Progressive Conservative	Allister Johnston	6,540	57.81	–1.77
Liberal	J. Walker	3,496	30.90	+4.82
Co-operative Commonwealth	Mel Eldridge	1,277	11.29	–3.05
Total valid votes		11,313	99.18	
Total rejected ballots		94	0.82	+0.02
Turnout		11,407	71.19	+1.41
Eligible voters		16,023		
Progressive Conservative hold		Swing		–3.30
Source: Elections Ontario

1955 Ontario general election
Party	Candidate	Votes	%	±%
Progressive Conservative	Allister Johnston	6,492	59.58	–0.66
Liberal	Milton Taylor Armstrong	2,842	26.08	–13.68
Co-operative Commonwealth	A. E. Matthews	1,562	14.34	–
Total valid votes		10,896	99.20	
Total rejected ballots		88	0.80	–0.61
Turnout		10,984	69.78	+0.87
Eligible voters		15,740		
Progressive Conservative hold		Swing		+6.51
Source: Elections Ontario

1951 Ontario general election
Party	Candidate	Votes	%	±%
Progressive Conservative	Allister Johnston	6,348	60.24	+7.08
Liberal	Milton Taylor Armstrong	4,190	39.76	+14.97
Total valid votes		10,538	98.59	
Total rejected ballots		151	1.41	+0.99
Turnout		10,689	68.92	+2.67
Eligible voters		15,510		
Progressive Conservative hold		Swing		–3.94
Source: Elections Ontario

Ontario provincial by-election, December 9, 1948 Death of Charles Cragg
Party	Candidate	Votes	%	±%
Progressive Conservative	Allister Johnston	5,576	53.16	+15.59
Liberal	Milton Taylor Armstrong	2,601	24.80	–8.97
Co-operative Commonwealth	Elmer Roy Smith	2,313	22.05	–6.62
Total valid votes		10,490	99.57	
Total rejected ballots		45	0.43	–0.25
Turnout		10,535	66.25	–9.30
Eligible voters		15,903		
Progressive Conservative hold		Swing		+12.28
Source: Elections Ontario

1948 Ontario general election
Party	Candidate	Votes	%	±%
Progressive Conservative	Charles Cragg	4,343	37.57	+1.82
Liberal	Milton Taylor Armstrong	3,904	33.77	–3.04
Co-operative Commonwealth	Elmer Roy Smith	3,314	28.67	+1.21
Total valid votes		11,561	99.32	
Total rejected ballots		79	0.68	–0.01
Turnout		11,640	75.55	+3.18
Eligible voters		15,408		
Progressive Conservative gain from Liberal		Swing		+2.43
Source: Elections Ontario

1945 Ontario general election
Party	Candidate	Votes	%	±%
Liberal	Milton Taylor Armstrong	4,289	36.81	+4.52
Progressive Conservative	Charles Cragg	4,165	35.74	+8.92
Co-operative Commonwealth	Elmer Roy Smith	3,199	27.45	–13.45
Total valid votes		11,653	99.31	
Total rejected ballots		81	0.69	+0.15
Turnout		11,734	72.37	+11.58
Eligible voters		16,215		
Liberal gain from Co-operative Commonwealth		Swing		+8.99
Source: Elections Ontario

1943 Ontario general election
Party	Candidate	Votes	%	±%
Co-operative Commonwealth	Elmer Roy Smith	4,221	40.90	–
Liberal	Milton Taylor Armstrong	3,332	32.28	–21.18
Progressive Conservative	Fred Johnstone	2,768	26.82	–19.72
Total valid votes		10,321	99.46	
Total rejected ballots		56	0.54	–0.18
Turnout		10,377	60.78	–14.65
Eligible voters		17,073		
Co-operative Commonwealth gain from Liberal		Swing		+9.86
Source: Elections Ontario

1937 Ontario general election
Party	Candidate	Votes	%	±%
Liberal	Milton Taylor Armstrong	6,168	53.46	–9.37
Conservative	William Herbert Jackson	5,369	46.54	+9.37
Total valid votes		11,537	99.28	
Total rejected ballots		84	0.72	–0.39
Turnout		11,621	75.43	–3.39
Eligible voters		15,406		
Liberal hold		Swing		–9.37
Source: Elections Ontario

1934 Ontario general election
Party	Candidate	Votes	%	±%
Liberal	Milton Taylor Armstrong	7,199	62.83	+19.31
Conservative	W. Herbert C. Jackson	4,259	37.17	–19.31
Total valid votes		11,458	98.89	
Total rejected ballots		129	1.11	+0.18
Turnout		11,587	78.82	+17.46
Eligible voters		14,700		
Liberal gain from Conservative		Swing		+19.31
Source: Elections Ontario

1929 Ontario general election
Party	Candidate	Votes	%	±%
Conservative	George Vernon Harcourt	4,507	56.48	–4.37
Liberal	William R. Dixon	3,473	43.52	+4.37
Total valid votes		7,980	99.07	
Total rejected ballots		75	0.93	+0.37
Turnout		8,055	61.37	+4.04
Eligible voters		13,126		
Conservative hold		Swing		–4.37
Source: Elections Ontario

1926 Ontario general election
Party	Candidate	Votes	%	±%
Conservative	George Vernon Harcourt	4,628	60.85	+4.75
Liberal	Thompson S. Trenough	2,978	39.15	+12.73
Total valid votes		7,606	99.44	
Total rejected ballots		43	0.56	+0.02
Turnout		7,649	57.33	–3.74
Eligible voters		13,342		
Conservative hold		Swing		–3.99
Source: Elections Ontario

1923 Ontario general election
Party	Candidate	Votes	%	±%
Conservative	George Vernon Harcourt	4,876	56.10	+10.59
Liberal	Richard Reese Hall	2,297	26.43	–28.06
United Farmers	Edwin John Purdon	1,519	17.48	–
Total valid votes		8,692	99.46	
Total rejected ballots		47	0.54	–2.66
Turnout		8,739	61.07	–11.50
Eligible voters		14,309		
Conservative gain from Liberal		Swing		+19.33
Source: Elections Ontario

1919 Ontario general election
Party	Candidate	Votes	%	±%
Liberal	Richard Reese Hall	4,618	54.49	+13.33
Conservative	Joseph Edgar	3,857	45.51	–13.33
Total valid votes		8,475	96.80	
Total rejected ballots		280	3.20	+2.63
Turnout		8,755	72.58	+11.33
Eligible voters		12,063		
Liberal gain from Conservative		Swing		+13.33
Source: Elections Ontario

1914 Ontario general election
Party	Candidate	Votes	%	±%
Conservative	Joseph Edgar	2,770	58.84	–7.16
Liberal	Gilbert F.R. Richardson	1,938	41.16	+7.16
Total valid votes		4,708	99.43	
Total rejected ballots		27	0.57	+0.10
Turnout		4,735	61.25	+25.50
Eligible voters		7,731		
Conservative hold		Swing		–7.16
Source: Elections Ontario

1911 Ontario general election
Party	Candidate	Votes	%	±%
Conservative	John Galna	2,218	65.99	+3.94
Liberal	Albert E. Bradwin	1,143	34.01	–0.82
Total valid votes		3,361	99.53	
Total rejected ballots		16	0.47	–0.38
Turnout		3,377	35.75	–18.13
Eligible voters		9,447		
Conservative hold		Swing		+2.38
Source: Elections Ontario

1908 Ontario general election
Party	Candidate	Votes	%	±%
Conservative	John Galna	2,879	62.05	+9.68
Liberal	John A. Johnson	1,616	34.83	–8.81
Independent	John Gardiner	145	3.13	–
Total valid votes		4,640	99.15	
Total rejected ballots		40	0.85	+0.51
Turnout		4,680	53.88	+10.13
Eligible voters		8,686		
Conservative hold		Swing		+9.24
Source: Elections Ontario

1905 Ontario general election
Party	Candidate	Votes	%	±%
Conservative	John Galna	2,243	52.37	+5.77
Liberal	Joseph Milton Carr	1,869	43.64	–9.76
Prohibitionist	D. B. Best	171	3.99	–
Total valid votes		4,283	99.65	
Total rejected ballots		15	0.35	+0.22
Turnout		4,298	43.75	+2.29
Eligible voters		9,825		
Conservative gain from Liberal		Swing		+7.77
Source: Elections Ontario

1902 Ontario general election
Party	Candidate	Votes	%	±%
Liberal	Joseph Milton Carr	2,490	53.40	–12.12
Conservative	Joseph Edgar	2,173	46.60	+12.12
Total valid votes		4,663	99.87	
Total rejected ballots		6	0.13	–1.07
Turnout		4,669	41.45	–48.60
Eligible voters		11,263		
Liberal hold		Swing		–12.12
Source: Elections Ontario

1898 Ontario general election
Party	Candidate	Votes	%	±%
Liberal	William Rabb Beatty	2,332	65.52	+22.47
Independent	Joseph Edgar	1,227	34.48	–
Total valid votes		3,559	98.81	
Total rejected ballots		43	1.19	–0.34
Turnout		3,602	90.05	+47.16
Eligible voters		4,000		
Liberal hold		Swing		+11.23
Source: Elections Ontario

1894 Ontario general election
Party	Candidate	Votes	%	±%
Liberal-Patrons of Industry	William Rabb Beatty	1,968	56.94	–
Liberal	James Sharpe	1,488	43.06	–9.01
Total valid votes		3,456	98.46	
Total rejected ballots		54	1.54	+0.21
Turnout		3,510	42.89	–
Eligible voters		8,183		
Liberal-Patrons of Industry gain from Liberal		Swing		–
Source: Elections Ontario

1890 Ontario general election
Party	Candidate	Votes	%	±%
Liberal	James Sharpe	1,387	52.06	–
Conservative	George McCormick	1,277	47.94	–0.18
Total valid votes		2,664	98.67	
Total rejected ballots		36	1.33	+0.18
Turnout		2,700	–	–
Eligible voters				
Liberal gain from Independent		Swing		+0.09
Source: Elections Ontario

1886 Ontario general election
Party	Candidate	Votes	%	±%
Independent	Samuel Armstrong	1,199	51.88	–
Conservative	G. McEachren	1,112	48.12	–
Total valid votes		2,311	98.85	
Total rejected ballots		27	1.15	–
Turnout		2,338	–	–
Eligible voters				
Independent pickup new district.				
Source: Elections Ontario
