= James Sharpe (Canadian politician) =

Canadian politician

Ontario MPP
- In office 1890–1894
- Preceded by: Samuel Armstrong
- Succeeded by: William Rabb Beatty
- Constituency: Parry Sound

Personal details
- Born: 1846 Huntingdonshire, England, United Kingdom of Great Britain and Ireland
- Died: October 30, 1935 (aged 89) Parry Sound, Ontario, Canada
- Party: Liberal
- Occupation: Businessman, politician

James Sharpe (1846 – October 30, 1935) was an English-born Canadian merchant and political figure in Ontario, Canada. He represented Parry Sound electoral district in the Legislative Assembly of Ontario as a Liberal member from 1890 to 1894.

He was born in Huntingdonshire, England, in 1846 and came to the Parry Sound area in 1871. Sharpe was the first reeve of Burk's Falls and operated a general store there. He was defeated in the 1894 election.
