= Milton Taylor Armstrong =

Canadian politician (1887–1957)

Ontario MPP
- In office 1945–1948
- Preceded by: Elmer Roy Smith
- Succeeded by: Charles Wilson Cragg
- In office 1934–1943
- Preceded by: George Vernon Harcourt
- Succeeded by: Elmer Roy Smith
- Constituency: Parry Sound

Personal details
- Born: August 23, 1887 McKellar, Ontario
- Died: November 12, 1957 (aged 70)
- Party: Liberal
- Occupation: Dentist

Milton Taylor Armstrong (August 23, 1887 – November 12, 1957) was a dentist and politician in Ontario, Canada. He represented Parry Sound in the Legislative Assembly of Ontario from 1934 to 1943 and from 1945 to 1948 as a Liberal.

The son of Samuel Armstrong and Catherine Taylor, he was born in McKellar and was educated in Parry Sound and at Toronto University.
