= Muskoka (provincial electoral district) =

Former provincial electoral district in Ontario, Canada

Ontario electoral district

Defunct provincial electoral district
- Legislature: Legislative Assembly of Ontario
- District created: 1875
- District abolished: 1996
- First contested: 1875
- Last contested: 1995

Muskoka was a provincial electoral district in Ontario, Canada. It existed in various incarnations and names throughout its existence. It started as Muskoka-Parry Sound in 1875 and then changed to Muskoka in 1886. In 1934 it changed to Muskoka-Ontario and lasted until 1955 when it changed back to Muskoka. In 1987 it changed again to Muskoka-Georgian Bay. It was eliminated by redistribution in 1999, and its territories went to the new ridings of Parry Sound—Muskoka (66%) and Simcoe North (34%).

== Members of Provincial Parliament ==
Muskoka
Assembly	Years	Member	Party
Muskoka and Parry Sound
3rd	1875–1879	John Classon Miller	Liberal
4th	1879–1882	John Classon Miller	Liberal
4th	1882–1883	James Whitney Bettes	Liberal
5th	1883–1884	Frederick G. Fauquier	Conservative
5th	1884–1886	Jacob William Dill	Liberal
Riding split into two ridings: Muskoka and Parry Sound
6th	1886–1890	George Marter	Conservative
7th	1890–1894	George Marter	Conservative
8th	1894–1898	George Edward Langford	Conservative
9th	1898–1902	Samuel Bridgeland	Liberal
10th	1902–1903	Samuel Bridgeland	Liberal
10th	1903–1904	Arthur Arnold Mahaffy	Conservative
11th	1905–1908	Arthur Arnold Mahaffy	Conservative
12th	1908–1911	Arthur Arnold Mahaffy	Conservative
13th	1911–1912	Arthur Arnold Mahaffy	Conservative
13th	1912–1914	Samuel Henry Armstrong	Conservative
14th	1914–1916	Samuel Henry Armstrong	Conservative
14th	1916–1919	George Ecclestone	Conservative
15th	1919–1923	George Ecclestone	Conservative
16th	1923–1926	George Ecclestone	Conservative
17th	1926–1929	George Ecclestone	Conservative
18th	1929–1934	George Ecclestone	Conservative
Muskoka–Ontario
19th	1934–1937	James Francis Kelly	Liberal–Progressive
20th	1937–1943	James Francis Kelly	Liberal
21st	1943–1945	James Francis Kelly	Liberal
22nd	1945–1948	George Arthur Welsh	Progressive Conservative
23rd	1948–1951	George Arthur Welsh	Progressive Conservative
24th	1951–1955	Robert Boyer	Progressive Conservative
Muskoka
25th	1955–1959	Robert Boyer	Progressive Conservative
26th	1959–1963	Robert Boyer	Progressive Conservative
27th	1963–1967	Robert Boyer	Progressive Conservative
28th	1967–1971	Robert Boyer	Progressive Conservative
29th	1971–1975	Frank Miller	Progressive Conservative
30th	1975–1977	Frank Miller	Progressive Conservative
31st	1977–1981	Frank Miller	Progressive Conservative
32nd	1981–1985	Frank Miller	Progressive Conservative
33rd	1985–1987	Frank Miller	Progressive Conservative
Muskoka–Georgian Bay
34th	1987–1990	Ken Black	Liberal
35th	1990–1995	Dan Waters	New Democratic
36th	1995–1999	Bill Grimmett	Progressive Conservative
Sourced from the Ontario Legislative Assembly
Merged into the ridings of Parry Sound—Muskoka and Simcoe North before the 1999 election

== Election results ==
=== Muskoka—Georgian Bay (1987–1999) ===
1995 Ontario general election: Muskoka—Georgian Bay
Party	Candidate	Votes	%	±%	Expenditures
Progressive Conservative	Bill Grimmett	17,864	51.79	+19.99	$40,807
Liberal	Ken Black	8,095	23.47	–4.10	$41,201
New Democratic	Dan Waters	7,742	22.45	–18.19	$26,533
Green	Michael L. Fenton	411	1.19	–	$330
Independent	Bill Ogilvie	381	1.10	–	$295
Total valid votes		34,493	99.02		
Total rejected, unmarked and declined ballots		340	0.98	+0.06	
Turnout		34,833	65.50	–2.15	
Eligible voters		53,179			
Progressive Conservative gain from New Democratic		Swing		+19.09	
Source: Elections Ontario

1990 Ontario general election: Muskoka—Georgian Bay
Party	Candidate	Votes	%	±%
New Democratic	Dan Waters	13,422	40.63	+16.38
Progressive Conservative	Marilyn Rowe	10,504	31.80	–0.49
Liberal	Ken Black	9,105	27.57	–15.89
Total valid votes		33,031	99.08	
Total rejected, unmarked and declined ballots		307	0.92	–0.02
Turnout		33,338	67.65	+2.58
Eligible voters		49,279		
New Democratic gain from Liberal		Swing		+16.14
Source: Elections Ontario

1987 Ontario general election: Muskoka—Georgian Bay
Party	Candidate	Votes	%	±%
Liberal	Ken Black	12,645	43.45	–
Progressive Conservative	George Beatty	9,396	32.29	–
New Democratic	Dan Waters	7,059	24.26	–
Total valid votes		29,100	99.06	
Total rejected ballots		276	0.94	–
Turnout		29,376	65.07	–
Eligible voters		45,146		
Liberal notional gain from Progressive Conservative		Swing		–
Source: Elections Ontario

=== Muskoka (1955–1987) ===
1985 Ontario general election
Party	Candidate	Votes	%	±%
Progressive Conservative	Frank Miller	12,723	68.42	+13.34
Liberal	Ken McClellan	3,036	16.33	–8.98
New Democratic	Bob Maguire	2,836	15.25	–4.36
Total valid votes		18,595	98.12	
Total rejected ballots		356	1.88	+1.64
Turnout		18,951	67.72	+3.31
Eligible voters		27,986		
Progressive Conservative hold		Swing		+11.16
Source: Elections Ontario

1981 Ontario general election
Party	Candidate	Votes	%	±%
Progressive Conservative	Frank Miller	9,029	55.09	+5.85
Liberal	Ken McClellan	4,148	25.31	+9.90
New Democratic	Jim Maguire	3,214	19.61	–15.76
Total valid votes		16,391	99.76	
Total rejected ballots		40	0.24	–0.03
Turnout		16,431	64.40	–8.52
Eligible voters		25,513		
Progressive Conservative hold		Swing		–2.02
Source: Elections Ontario

1977 Ontario general election
Party	Candidate	Votes	%	±%
Progressive Conservative	Frank Miller	8,865	49.23	+5.26
New Democratic	Ken Cargill	6,368	35.36	–0.04
Liberal	Peggie Fitzpatrick	2,774	15.41	–4.52
Total valid votes		18,007	99.73	
Total rejected ballots		49	0.27	–0.10
Turnout		18,056	72.93	+4.22
Eligible voters		24,759		
Progressive Conservative hold		Swing		+2.65
Source: Elections Ontario

1975 Ontario general election
Party	Candidate	Votes	%	±%
Progressive Conservative	Frank Miller	7,061	43.97	–6.04
New Democratic	Ken Cargill	5,685	35.41	+6.94
Liberal	Peggie Fitzpatrick	3,200	19.93	–1.59
Social Credit	William Triska	111	0.69	–
Total valid votes		16,057	99.63	
Total rejected ballots		60	0.37	–0.07
Turnout		16,117	68.70	–4.98
Eligible voters		23,459		
Progressive Conservative hold		Swing		–6.49
Source: Elections Ontario

1971 Ontario general election
Party	Candidate	Votes	%	±%
Progressive Conservative	Frank Miller	7,240	50.01	–11.98
New Democratic	Ken Cargill	4,121	28.47	+9.66
Liberal	Raymond D. Patchett	3,116	21.52	+2.32
Total valid votes		14,477	99.55	
Total rejected ballots		65	0.45	–0.43
Turnout		14,542	73.68	+6.55
Eligible voters		19,737		
Progressive Conservative hold		Swing		–10.82
Source: Elections Ontario

1967 Ontario general election
Party	Candidate	Votes	%	±%
Progressive Conservative	Robert James Boyer	6,458	61.99	–1.14
Liberal	Lloyd Carstairs	2,001	19.21	–8.02
New Democratic	Earl Heiber	1,959	18.80	+9.15
Total valid votes		10,418	99.12	
Total rejected ballots		92	0.88	–0.09
Turnout		10,510	67.13	–1.31
Eligible voters		15,657		
Progressive Conservative hold		Swing		+3.44
Source: Elections Ontario

1963 Ontario general election
Party	Candidate	Votes	%	±%
Progressive Conservative	Robert James Boyer	6,639	63.13	+6.66
Liberal	Maurice W. Fitzmaurice	2,863	27.22	–8.84
New Democratic	Hugh A. Bishop	1,015	9.65	+2.18
Total valid votes		10,517	99.03	
Total rejected ballots		103	0.97	+0.01
Turnout		10,620	68.44	–3.19
Eligible voters		15,517		
Progressive Conservative hold		Swing		+7.75
Source: Elections Ontario

1959 Ontario general election
Party	Candidate	Votes	%	±%
Progressive Conservative	Robert James Boyer	5,995	56.47	+8.84
Liberal	Wanda Miller	3,829	36.06	–6.72
Co-operative Commonwealth	Charles Spencer	793	7.47	–2.12
Total valid votes		10,617	99.04	
Total rejected ballots		103	0.96	–0.15
Turnout		10,720	71.63	–5.64
Eligible voters		14,966		
Progressive Conservative hold		Swing		+7.78
Source: Elections Ontario

1955 Ontario general election
Party	Candidate	Votes	%	±%
Progressive Conservative	Robert James Boyer	5,256	47.63	–
Liberal	Wanda Miller	4,721	42.78	–
Co-operative Commonwealth	Clarence Watson	1,058	9.59	–
Total valid votes		11,035	98.89	
Total rejected ballots		124	1.11	–
Turnout		11,159	77.27	–
Eligible voters		14,442		
Progressive Conservative notional hold		Swing		–
Source: Elections Ontario

=== Muskoka–Ontario (1934–1955) ===
1951 Ontario general election: Muskoka—Ontario
Party	Candidate	Votes	%	±%
Progressive Conservative	George Arthur Welsh	9,370	54.17	+12.75
Liberal	Arthur F. Ferguson	6,563	37.94	–1.72
Co-operative Commonwealth	Bessie G. Mitchell	1,364	7.89	–11.04
Total valid votes		17,297	99.07	
Total rejected ballots		162	0.93	+0.19
Turnout		17,459	73.70	+2.55
Eligible voters		23,688		
Progressive Conservative hold		Swing		+7.23
Source: Elections Ontario

1948 Ontario general election: Muskoka—Ontario
Party	Candidate	Votes	%	±%
Progressive Conservative	George Arthur Welsh	7,197	41.42	–6.29
Liberal	James Francis Kelly	6,891	39.66	+3.19
Co-operative Commonwealth	Earl C. Mitchell	3,288	18.92	+3.11
Total valid votes		17,376	99.26	
Total rejected ballots		130	0.74	–0.04
Turnout		17,506	71.15	–2.11
Eligible voters		24,604		
Progressive Conservative hold		Swing		–4.74
Source: Elections Ontario

1945 Ontario general election: Muskoka—Ontario
Party	Candidate	Votes	%	±%
Progressive Conservative	George Arthur Welsh	8,073	47.71	+13.60
Liberal	James Francis Kelly	6,171	36.47	+1.63
Co-operative Commonwealth	Harper F. Newman	2,676	15.82	–15.23
Total valid votes		16,920	99.21	
Total rejected ballots		134	0.79	+0.04
Turnout		17,054	73.26	+17.09
Eligible voters		23,279		
Progressive Conservative gain from Liberal		Swing		+5.98
Source: Elections Ontario

1943 Ontario general election: Muskoka—Ontario
Party	Candidate	Votes	%	±%
Liberal	James Francis Kelly	4,219	34.84	–17.25
Progressive Conservative	John S. Gibson	4,131	34.12	–13.79
Co-operative Commonwealth	G. U. Mills	3,759	31.04	–
Total valid votes		12,109	99.25	
Total rejected ballots		91	0.75	+0.04
Turnout		12,200	56.17	–21.46
Eligible voters		21,720		
Liberal hold		Swing		–1.73
Source: Elections Ontario

1937 Ontario general election: Muskoka—Ontario
Party	Candidate	Votes	%	±%
Liberal	James Francis Kelly	9,720	52.09	–4.76
Conservative	Mason Horner	8,939	47.91	+4.76
Total valid votes		18,659	99.30	
Total rejected ballots		132	0.70	–0.01
Turnout		18,791	77.63	–1.41
Eligible voters		24,206		
Liberal hold		Swing		–4.76
Source: Elections Ontario

1934 Ontario general election: Muskoka—Ontario
Party	Candidate	Votes	%	±%
Liberal–Progressive	James Francis Kelly	10,590	56.86	–
Conservative	George Walter Ecclestone	8,036	43.14	–
Total valid votes		18,626	99.29	
Total rejected ballots		133	0.71	–
Turnout		18,759	79.04	–
Eligible voters		23,734		
Liberal–Progressive notional gain from Conservative		Swing		–
Source: Elections Ontario

=== Muskoka (1886–1934) ===
1929 Ontario general election
Party	Candidate	Votes
Conservative	George Walter Ecclestone	acclaimed
Source: Elections Ontario

1926 Ontario general election
Party	Candidate	Votes	%	±%
Conservative	George Walter Ecclestone	4,206	57.83	–6.62
Prohibitionist	Fred Berner	3,067	42.17	–
Total valid votes		7,273	99.39	
Total rejected ballots		45	0.61	–0.19
Turnout		7,318	65.47	–
Eligible voters		11,177		
Conservative hold		Swing		–3.31
Source: Elections Ontario

1923 Ontario general election
Party	Candidate	Votes	%	±%
Conservative	George Walter Ecclestone	4,186	64.45	+18.23
Liberal	Harmon Edmund Rice	2,309	35.55	–6.28
Total valid votes		6,495	99.19	
Total rejected ballots		53	0.81	–2.74
Turnout		6,548	–	–
Eligible voters				
Conservative hold		Swing		+12.25
Source: Elections Ontario

1919 Ontario general election
Party	Candidate	Votes	%	±%
Conservative	George Walter Ecclestone	3,054	46.22	–
Liberal	Harmon Edmund Rice	2,764	41.83	–
Independent	D'Alton J. Armstrong	789	11.94	–
Total valid votes		6,607	96.45	
Total rejected ballots		243	3.55	–
Turnout		6,850	64.48	–
Eligible voters		10,623		
Conservative hold		Swing		–
Source: Elections Ontario

Ontario provincial by-election, June 12, 1916 Death of Samuel Henry Armstrong
Party	Candidate	Votes
Conservative	George Walter Ecclestone	acclaimed
Source: Elections Ontario

1914 Ontario general election
Party	Candidate	Votes	%	±%
Conservative	Samuel Henry Armstrong	2,056	63.09	–14.76
Liberal	George Wellington Lankin	1,203	36.91	+14.76
Total valid votes		3,259	99.60	
Total rejected ballots		13	0.40	–
Turnout		3,272	72.70	–
Eligible voters		4,501		
Conservative hold		Swing		–14.76
Source: Elections Ontario

Ontario provincial by-election, November 5, 1912 Arthur Arnold Mahaffy appointed a Judge
Party	Candidate	Votes
Conservative	Samuel Henry Armstrong	acclaimed
Source: Elections Ontario

1911 Ontario general election
Party	Candidate	Votes	%	±%
Conservative	Arthur Arnold Mahaffy	1,970	77.87	–
Liberal	John Galbraith	560	22.13	–
Total valid votes		2,530	99.53	
Total rejected ballots		12	0.47	–
Turnout		2,542	45.71	–
Eligible voters		5,561		
Conservative hold		Swing		–
Source: Elections Ontario

1908 Ontario general election
Party	Candidate	Votes
Conservative	Arthur Arnold Mahaffy	acclaimed
Source: Elections Ontario

1905 Ontario general election
Party	Candidate	Votes	%	±%
Conservative	Arthur Arnold Mahaffy	2,122	63.46	+11.14
Liberal	F. L. Howland	1,222	36.54	–11.14
Total valid votes		3,344	99.91	
Total rejected ballots		3	0.09	+0.09
Turnout		3,347	59.12	–
Eligible voters		5,661		
Conservative hold		Swing		+11.14
Source: Elections Ontario

Ontario provincial by-election, October 27, 1903 Death of Samuel Bridgeland
Party	Candidate	Votes	%	±%
Conservative	Arthur Arnold Mahaffy	2,193	52.31	+3.36
Liberal	Dr. Hart	1,999	47.69	–3.36
Total valid votes		4,192	100.00	
Total rejected ballots		–		
Turnout		4,192	–	–
Eligible voters				
Conservative gain from Liberal		Swing		+3.36
Source: Elections Ontario

1902 Ontario general election
Party	Candidate	Votes	%	±%
Liberal	Samuel Bridgeland	2,089	51.05	+0.08
Conservative	Arthur Arnold Mahaffy	2,003	48.95	–0.08
Total valid votes		4,092	99.18	
Total rejected ballots		34	0.82	+0.22
Turnout		4,126	72.15	+1.79
Eligible voters		5,719		
Liberal hold		Swing		+0.08
Source: Elections Ontario

1898 Ontario general election
Party	Candidate	Votes	%	±%
Liberal	Samuel Bridgeland	1,938	50.97	+3.42
Conservative	George Edward Langford	1,864	49.03	–3.42
Total valid votes		3,802	99.40	
Total rejected ballots		23	0.60	–0.09
Turnout		3,825	70.35	–4.67
Eligible voters		5,437		
Liberal gain from Conservative		Swing		+3.42
Source: Elections Ontario

1894 Ontario general election
Party	Candidate	Votes	%	±%
Conservative-Protestant Protective	George Edward Langford	1,803	52.44	+0.98
Liberal	Alexander Peter Cockburn	1,635	47.56	–0.98
Total valid votes		3,438	99.31	
Total rejected ballots		24	0.69	–0.35
Turnout		3,462	75.02	–2.74
Eligible voters		4,615		
Conservative hold		Swing		+0.98
Source: Elections Ontario

1890 Ontario general election
Party	Candidate	Votes	%	±%
Conservative	George Frederick Marter	1,565	51.46	–2.37
Liberal	Alexander Peter Cockburn	1,476	48.54	+2.37
Total valid votes		3,041	98.96	
Total rejected ballots		32	1.04	+0.63
Turnout		3,073	77.76	+4.86
Eligible voters		3,952		
Conservative hold		Swing		–2.37
Source: Elections Ontario

1886 Ontario general election
Party	Candidate	Votes	%	±%
Conservative	George Frederick Marter	1,565	53.84	–
Liberal	James Whitney Bettes	1,342	46.16	–
Total valid votes		2,907	99.59	
Total rejected ballots		12	0.41	–
Turnout		2,919	72.90	–
Eligible voters		4,004		
Conservative notional gain from Liberal		Swing		–
Source: Elections Ontario

=== Muskoka and Parry Sound (1875–1886) ===
Ontario provincial by-election, July 23, 1884: Muskoka and Parry Sound Void Election
Party	Candidate	Votes	%	±%
Liberal	Jacob William Dill	1,988	51.65	+3.95
Conservative	G. McEachren	1,861	48.35	–3.95
Total valid votes		3,849	100.00	
Total rejected ballots		–		
Turnout		3,849	–	–
Eligible voters				
Liberal gain from Conservative		Swing		+3.95
Source: Elections Ontario

1883 Ontario general election: Muskoka and Parry Sound
Party	Candidate	Votes	%	±%
Conservative	Frederick G. Fauquier	2,278	52.30	+8.49
Liberal	James Whitney Bettes	2,078	47.70	–8.49
Total valid votes		4,356	99.63	
Total rejected ballots		16	0.37	+0.37
Turnout		4,372	113.65	–
Eligible voters		3,847		
Conservative gain from Liberal		Swing		+8.49
Source: Elections Ontario

Ontario provincial by-election, October 30, 1882: Muskoka and Parry Sound Resignation of John Classon Miller to contest the 1882 federal election
Party	Candidate	Votes	%	±%
Liberal	James Whitney Bettes	1,882	56.20	–1.78
Conservative	E. Prowse	1,467	43.80	+1.78
Total valid votes		3,349	100.00	
Total rejected ballots		–		
Turnout		3,349	–	–
Eligible voters				
Liberal hold		Swing		–1.78
Source: Elections Ontario

1879 Ontario general election
Party	Candidate	Votes	%	±%
Liberal	John Classon Miller	1,704	57.98	−0.65
Conservative	Mr. Boys	1,235	42.02	+0.65
Total valid votes		2,939	74.90	+9.38
Eligible voters		3,924		
Liberal hold		Swing		−0.65
Source: Elections Ontario

1875 Ontario general election
Party	Candidate	Votes	%
Liberal	John Classon Miller	839	58.63
Conservative	J. Long	592	41.37
Total valid votes		1,431	65.52
Eligible voters		2,184	
Liberal pickup new district.			
Source: Elections Ontario

== See also ==
- List of Ontario provincial electoral districts
- Canadian provincial electoral districts
