= John Galna =

Canadian politician

Ontario MPP
- In office 1905–1914
- Preceded by: Joseph Milton Carr
- Succeeded by: Joseph Edgar
- Constituency: Parry Sound

Personal details
- Born: February 22, 1849 Quebec City, Canada East
- Died: April 23, 1918 (aged 69) Businessman
- Party: Conservative
- Spouse: Caroline W. Dawter (m. 1874)

John Galna (February 22, 1849 – April 23, 1918) was a contractor, ship owner and politician in Ontario, Canada. He represented Parry Sound in the Legislative Assembly of Ontario from 1905 to 1914 as a Conservative.

The son of John Galna and Jane Hall, both natives of Ireland, he was born in Quebec City, Canada East, and was educated there. Galna was customs officer at Parry Sound from 1881 to 1896. He served as Parry Sound mayor from 1891 to 1892.

In 1874, Galna married Caroline W. Dawter.

The Galna Bridge which spanned the Magnetawan River from 1912 to 1987 was named in his honour.
