= Dan Waters =

Canadian politician

Ontario MPP
- In office 1990–1995
- Preceded by: Ken Black
- Succeeded by: Bill Grimmett
- Constituency: Muskoka—Georgian Bay

Personal details
- Party: New Democrat; Liberal since 1999
- Occupation: Auto shop owner

Daniel Waters is a politician in Ontario, Canada. He served as a New Democratic Party member of the Legislative Assembly of Ontario from 1990 to 1995.

== Background ==
Waters worked at the Bracebridge Alcan plant before 1990, and operated an auto repair and service shop in Baysville until 2006. He now manages properties on Lakes Muskoka and Rosseau and lives on HWY 118 West.

== Politics ==
He ran for the Ontario legislature in the 1987 provincial election, but finished third in the central Ontario riding of Muskoka—Georgian Bay against Liberal Ken Black.

The NDP won a majority government in the 1990 provincial election and Waters was elected for the riding on his second try. He defeated Progressive Conservative Marilyn Rowe by just under 3,000 votes; Black finished third. Waters served as a parliamentary assistant from 1990 to 1995.

In 1994, Waters was one of twelve NDP members to vote against Bill 167, a bill extending financial benefits to same-sex partners. Premier Bob Rae allowed a free vote on the bill which allowed members of his party to vote with their conscience.

The NDP were defeated in the 1995 provincial election, and Waters was defeated in his bid for re-election, finishing third against Progressive Conservative Bill Grimmett. He ran for the NDP again in the 1999 provincial election, but finished a distant third against PC candidate (and future Premier of Ontario) Ernie Eves in the redistributed riding of Parry Sound-Muskoka. In 2000, he unsuccessfully campaigned for a municipal seat in Lake of Bays Township.

After the 1999 election, Waters changed his affiliation from the NDP to the Liberal Party. For the 2003 provincial election, he won the Parry Sound–Muskoka Liberal nomination over Evelyn Brown and challenged Progressive Conservative incumbent Norm Miller, who had succeeded Eves in a by-election. Although the Liberals won a majority government provincially, Waters lost to Miller by more than 5,000 votes.

== Electoral record ==
2003 Ontario general election: Parry Sound—Muskoka
Party	Candidate	Votes	%	±%	Expenditures
Progressive Conservative	Norm Miller	18,776	48.51		$49,869
Liberal	Dan Waters	13,332	34.44	–	$42,984
New Democratic	Jo-Anne Boulding	3,838	9.92		$8,378
Green	Glen Hodgson	2,277	5.88	–	$3,385
Family Coalition	Charlene Phinney	484	1.25	–	$909
Total valid votes		38,707	100.00		
Rejected, unmarked and declined ballots		138			
Turnout		38,845	60.03		
Electors on the lists		64,710			

Sources: Poll-by-poll results, Elections Ontario, and Financial Statements, Elections Ontario.

1995 Ontario general election: Muskoka–Georgian Bay
Party	Candidate	Votes	%	±%	Expenditures
Progressive Conservative	Bill Grimmett	17,864	51.79	+19.99	$40,807
Liberal	Ken Black	8,095	23.47	−4.10	$41,201
New Democratic	Dan Waters	7,742	22.45	−18.18	$26,533
Green	Michael Fenton	411	1.19	–	$330
Independent	Bill Ogilvie	381	1.10		$295
Total valid votes		34,493	100.00		
Rejected, unmarked and declined ballots		340			
Turnout		34,833	65.50	−2.15	
Electors on the lists		53,179			

1990 Ontario general election: Muskoka–Georgian Bay
Party	Candidate	Votes	%	±%
New Democratic	Dan Waters	13,422	40.63	+16.37
Progressive Conservative	Marilyn Rowe	10,504	31.80	−0.49
Liberal	Ken Black	9,105	27.57	−15.88
Total valid votes		33,031	100.00	
Total rejected, unmarked and declined ballots		307		
Turnout		33,338	67.65	+2.48
Electors on the lists		49,279		

1987 Ontario general election: Muskoka–Georgian Bay
Party	Candidate	Votes	%	±%
Liberal	Ken Black	12,645	43.45	
Progressive Conservative	George Beatty	9,396	32.39	
New Democratic	Dan Waters	7,059	24.26	
Total valid votes		29,100	100.00	
Total rejected, unmarked and declined ballots		320		
Turnout		29,420	65.17	
Electors on the lists		45,146		
