= George Beatty (judge) =

Canadian politician

William George Beatty is a judge and former politician in the Canadian province of Ontario. He currently serves on the Central East Region of the Ontario Court of Justice.

== Family background ==
Beatty was born into an established family in Fergus, Ontario. His grandfather, also named William George Beatty, was a successful businessman who helped establish the largest manufacturer of households items in the British Commonwealth.

He is the brother of Perrin Beatty, who was a high-profile cabinet minister in the government of Brian Mulroney. Both brothers became involved with Progressive Conservative Party of Canada in the 1962 federal election after attending a speech by John Diefenbaker.

== Legal career ==
Beatty was appointed to the Ontario Bar in 1977 and has an extensive background in criminal and family law. He was president of the Muskoka Law Association from 1994 to 1996.

== Politician ==
Beatty had a long association with the Progressive Conservative Party of Ontario prior to his appointment to the bench. He was the party's riding association president for Muskoka in the 1980s, and was an ally of local MPP Frank Miller during the latter's tenure as party leader. At the party's November 1985 leadership convention, Beatty supported Alan Pope's bid to become Miller's successor.

Beatty won the Progressive Conservative nomination for Muskoka–Georgian Bay in the buildup to the 1987 provincial election, defeating three other candidates in three ballots (on the final ballot, he defeated rival candidate Bruce Stanton by only one vote). A newspaper account from this period describes him as a "painfully thin, soft-spoken country lawyer." Although considered a high-profile candidate for the historically conservative territory, he was defeated by Liberal candidate Ken Black on election day.

== Judge ==
Beatty was appointed as a provincial judge by Attorney-General Charles Harnick in December 1998. He was assigned to Bracebridge.

In 2006, while serving as president of the Ontario Conference of Judges, Beatty criticized judges who were unwilling to review offensive and disturbing images in cases involving child pornography. He acknowledged that it was understandable for judges to want to avoid such images, but also argued that such reluctance would compromise their ability to make fair rulings. (A senior crown attorney had previously complained that some judges were imposing lenient sentences because of their refusal to view the material.)

In 2008, Beatty wrapped up preliminary hearings in a serious case involving corruption charges against Toronto police officers.

In 2013, on April 2 an elderly woman in Orillia, Ms. Farrell was attacked by Sgt. Watson, his Honour delivered a landmark decision that sent a direct message to the Policing community, in his Honour's decision he wrote: "Sgt. Watson provided no explanation as to how Ms. Farrell’s tibia was broken, or indeed, the reasons for the bruises on her legs, arms and the loss of a tooth," Provincial Court Justice George Beatty said in his ruling. "Ms. Farrell was acting as a Good Samaritan ... She wanted to assist Sgt. Watson in identifying the assailants.

== Electoral record ==
1987 Ontario general election: Muskoka–Georgian Bay
Party	Candidate	Votes	%	±%
Liberal	Ken Black	12,645	43.45	
Progressive Conservative	George Beatty	9,396	32.39	
New Democratic	Dan Waters	7,059	24.26	
Total valid votes		29,100	100.00	
Total rejected, unmarked and declined ballots		320		
Turnout		29,420	65.17	
Electors on the lists		45,146		
