= George Vernon Harcourt =

Canadian politician

Ontario MPP
- In office 1923–1934
- Preceded by: Richard Reese Hall
- Succeeded by: Milton Taylor Armstrong
- Constituency: Parry Sound

Personal details
- Born: February 28, 1873 Port Hope, Ontario
- Died: February 1, 1934 (aged 60) Toronto, Ontario
- Party: Conservative
- Occupation: Physician

George Vernon Harcourt (February 28, 1873 – February 1, 1934) was a physician and political figure in Ontario. He represented Parry Sound in the Legislative Assembly of Ontario from 1923 to 1934 as a Conservative member.

He was born in Port Hope, the son of George Harcourt and Frances Morton, of Irish descent, and was educated in Port Hope and at the University of Trinity College in Toronto, graduating in medicine. Harcourt practised in the Parry Sound area, later settling at Powassan. He died in office in Toronto of a coronary thrombosis.
