= Arthur Arnold Mahaffy =

Canadian politician

A. A. Mahaffy

Ontario MPP
- In office 1903–1912
- Preceded by: Samuel Bridgeland
- Succeeded by: Samuel Armstrong
- Constituency: Muskoka

Personal details
- Born: December 30, 1861 Grey County, Canada West
- Died: November 3, 1947 (aged 85) Bracebridge, Ontario
- Party: Conservative
- Spouse: Alice Rosalie Thomson (m. 1891)
- Occupation: Lawyer

Arthur Arnold Mahaffy (December 30, 1861 – November 3, 1947) was an Ontario barrister and political figure. He represented Muskoka in the Legislative Assembly of Ontario from 1903 to 1912 as a Conservative member.

He was born in Grey County, Canada West, the son of doctor John Mahaffy. In 1891, he married Alice Rosalie Thomson. He was elected to the provincial assembly in a 1903 by-election held after the death of Samuel Bridgeland.

Mahaffy later served as a judge. He died in Bracebridge on November 3, 1947.
