= Richard Reese Hall =

Canadian politician from Ontario

Member of the Ontario Provincial Parliament for Parry Sound
- In office October 20, 1919 – May 10, 1923
- Preceded by: Joseph Edgar
- Succeeded by: George Vernon Harcourt

Personal details
- Party: Liberal

Richard Reese Hall was a Canadian politician from Ontario. He represented Parry Sound in the Legislative Assembly of Ontario from 1919 to 1923.

== See also ==
- 15th Parliament of Ontario
