= Elmer Roy Smith =

Canadian politician

Ontario MPP
- In office 1943–1945
- Preceded by: Milton Taylor Armstrong
- Succeeded by: Milton Taylor Armstrong
- Constituency: Parry Sound

Personal details
- Born: December 24, 1912 Parry Sound, Ontario
- Died: September 14, 1989 (aged 76) Parry Sound, Ontario
- Party: CCF
- Spouse: Beatrice Merrill Johnston (m. 1937)
- Occupation: Carpenter

Elmer Roy Smith (December 24, 1913 – September 14, 1989) was a carpenter and political figure in Ontario. He represented Parry Sound in the Legislative Assembly of Ontario from 1943 to 1945 as a Co-operative Commonwealth member.

He was born in Parry Sound, the son of George Lionel Smith and Marguerite Leavens, and was educated there. In 1937, Smith married Beatrice Merrill Johnston.
