= Frederick G. Fauquier =

Canadian politician from Ontario

Member of the Ontario Provincial Parliament for Muskoka and Parry Sound
- In office February 27, 1883 – November 15, 1886
- Preceded by: James Whitney Bettes
- Succeeded by: Jacob William Dill

Personal details
- Party: Conservative

Frederick G. Fauquier was a Canadian politician from Ontario. He represented Muskoka and Parry Sound in the Legislative Assembly of Ontario from 1883 to 1886.

== See also ==
- 5th Parliament of Ontario
