= Robert James Boyer =

Canadian politician

Robert Boyer

Ontario MPP
- In office 1955–1971
- Preceded by: George Arthur Welsh (Note: Riding name changed from Muskoka-Ontario.)
- Succeeded by: Frank Miller
- Constituency: Muskoka

Personal details
- Born: December 14, 1913 Bracebridge, Ontario
- Died: January 20, 2005 (aged 91) Bracebridge, Ontario
- Party: Progressive Conservative
- Occupation: Journalist

Robert James Boyer (December 14, 1913 – January 20, 2005) was an Ontario journalist, author and political figure. He represented Muskoka as a Progressive Conservative member from 1955 to 1971.

Boyer was the son of George Boyer. He married Patricia Johnson. He served as a trustee of the Royal Ontario Museum and helped found the Muskoka Heritage Foundation . Boyer died in Bracebridge in 2005.

Boyer wrote a book about Bracebridge's history, A Good Town Grew Here ISBN 0-9688671-1-1.
