= Samuel Bridgeland =

Canadian politician

Ontario MPP
- In office 1898–1903
- Preceded by: George Langford
- Succeeded by: Arthur Mahaffy
- Constituency: Muskoka

Personal details
- Born: July 31, 1847 Downsview, Canada West
- Died: May 6, 1903 (aged 55) Toronto, Ontario
- Party: Liberal
- Spouse: Emma Fraser (m. 1873)
- Occupation: Physician

Samuel Bridgeland (July 31, 1847 – May 6, 1903) was an Ontario physician and political figure. He represented Muskoka in the Legislative Assembly of Ontario as a Liberal member from 1898 to 1903.

He was born in Downsview, Canada West to provincial surveyor James William Bridgland and educated in Newmarket. He studied medicine at Jefferson Medical College in Philadelphia and then at Queen's University. He set up practice in Bracebridge. In 1873, Bridgeland married Emma Fraser. He died in office in 1903.
