= Charles Cragg =

Canadian politician from Ontario

Member of the Ontario Provincial Parliament for Parry Sound
- In office June 7, 1948 – August 19, 1948
- Preceded by: Milton Taylor Armstrong
- Succeeded by: Allister Johnston

Personal details
- Died: August 19, 1948
- Party: Progressive Conservative

Charles Wilson Cragg (died August 19, 1948) was a Canadian politician who was Progressive Conservative MPP for Parry Sound for two months in 1948.

== See also ==
- 23rd Parliament of Ontario
