= James Whitney Bettes =

Canadian politician

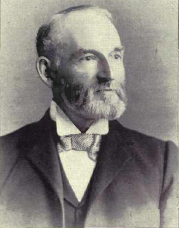

Ontario MPP
- In office 1882–1883
- Preceded by: John Classon Miller
- Succeeded by: Frederick G. Fauquier
- Constituency: Muskoka and Parry Sound

Personal details
- Born: October 17, 1848 Prince Albert, Ontario County, Canada West
- Died: November 29, 1925 (aged 77) Dauphin, Manitoba
- Party: Liberal
- Spouse: Martha Maria Crosby (m. 1872)
- Occupation: Merchant

James Whitney Bettes (October 17, 1848 – November 29, 1925) was an Ontario merchant and political figure. He represented Muskoka and Parry Sound in the Legislative Assembly of Ontario as a Liberal member from 1882 to 1883.

He was born in Prince Albert, Ontario County, Canada West in 1848, the son of John Bettes. In 1872, Bettes married Martha Maria Crosby, a granddaughter of John Willson. He served on the council for Uxbridge. He was elected to the provincial assembly in an 1882 by-election held after John Classon Miller resigned to run unsuccessfully for a seat in the House of Commons.

He died in 1925 at Dauphin, Manitoba.
