= George Edward Langford =

Canadian politician

George Langford

Ontario MPP
- In office 1894–1898
- Preceded by: George Frederick Marter
- Succeeded by: Samuel Bridgeland
- Constituency: Muskoka

Personal details
- Born: September 15, 1859 London, Canada West
- Died: September 28, 1941 (aged 82) Bracebridge, Ontario
- Party: Protestant Protective Association (Conservative)
- Spouse: Elizabeth Ann Sloper (m. 1896)
- Occupation: Farmer

George Edward Langford (September 15, 1859 – September 28, 1941) was an Ontario farmer and political figure.

== Biography ==
He represented Muskoka in the Legislative Assembly of Ontario from 1894 to 1898 as a Conservative-Protestant Protective Association member.

He was born in London, Canada West, the son of Isaac Langford, an Irish immigrant, and was educated in Middlesex County. He served three years as reeve for the township council for Bracebridge.
