= George Walter Ecclestone =

Canadian politician

George Ecclestone

Ontario MPP
- In office 1916–1934
- Preceded by: Samuel Henry Armstrong
- Succeeded by: James Francis Kelly (Note: Riding renamed to Muskoka–Ontario.)
- Constituency: Muskoka

Personal details
- Born: October 8, 1865 Dawn Mills, Kent County, Canada West
- Died: August 10, 1940 (aged 74)
- Party: Conservative
- Spouse: Alice Warner Jacobs (m. 1890)
- Occupation: Merchant

George Walter Ecclestone (October 8, 1865 – August 10, 1940) was a hardware merchant and political figure in Ontario. He represented Muskoka in the Legislative Assembly of Ontario from 1916 to 1934 as a Conservative member.

He was born in Dawn Mills, Kent County, Ontario, the son of John William Ecclestone, of Loddon and Great Yarmouth, Norfolk, England and the former Ann Jane Chiltick, born Brookeborough, Fermanagh, Ireland. In 1890, Ecclestone married Alice Warner Jacobs. He served as mayor of Bracebridge, as president of the local board of trade and as chairman of the Bracebridge Power and Light Commission. Ecclestone was elected to the assembly in a 1916 by-election held following the death of Samuel Henry Armstrong.
