= Samuel Armstrong (Canadian politician) =

Canadian politician (1844–1921)

Ontario MPP
- In office 1886–1890
- Preceded by: New riding
- Succeeded by: James Sharpe
- Constituency: Parry Sound

Personal details
- Born: February 24, 1844 Ross, County Wexford, Ireland
- Died: April 3, 1921 (aged 77) Parry Sound, Ontario
- Party: Independent
- Spouse: Catherine Taylor (m. 1870)
- Occupation: Businessman

Samuel Armstrong (February 24, 1844 – April 3, 1921) was an Ontario businessman and political figure. He represented Parry Sound in the Legislative Assembly of Ontario from 1886 to 1890 as an Independent member.

He was born in Ross, County Wexford, Ireland in 1844, the son of Samuel Armstrong, and came to Canada West with his family in 1848. Armstrong was self-educated in Toronto and attended some public school in Thorold and Toronto. The family eventually settled in the Parry Sound district. He was named a justice of the peace in 1868. In 1870, he married Catherine Taylor. Armstrong was postmaster for the village of McKellar from 1871 to 1886 and served as reeve from 1872 to 1887. He operated a general store and sawmill and was also involved in the timber trade and the construction of railways and roads. He supported prohibition of alcohol and extending the vote to women. While he was a member of Parliament he served on Standing Committees from 1887 to 1890.

In 1895, he was named sheriff for Parry Sound. For many of his years as sheriff, he was blind.

Armstrong died at Parry Sound in 1921 aged 77.

== Legacy ==
The township of Armstrong in Timiskaming District was named in his honour.
