= Graydon Smith =

Canadian politician

The Honourable Graydon Smith ECO MPP
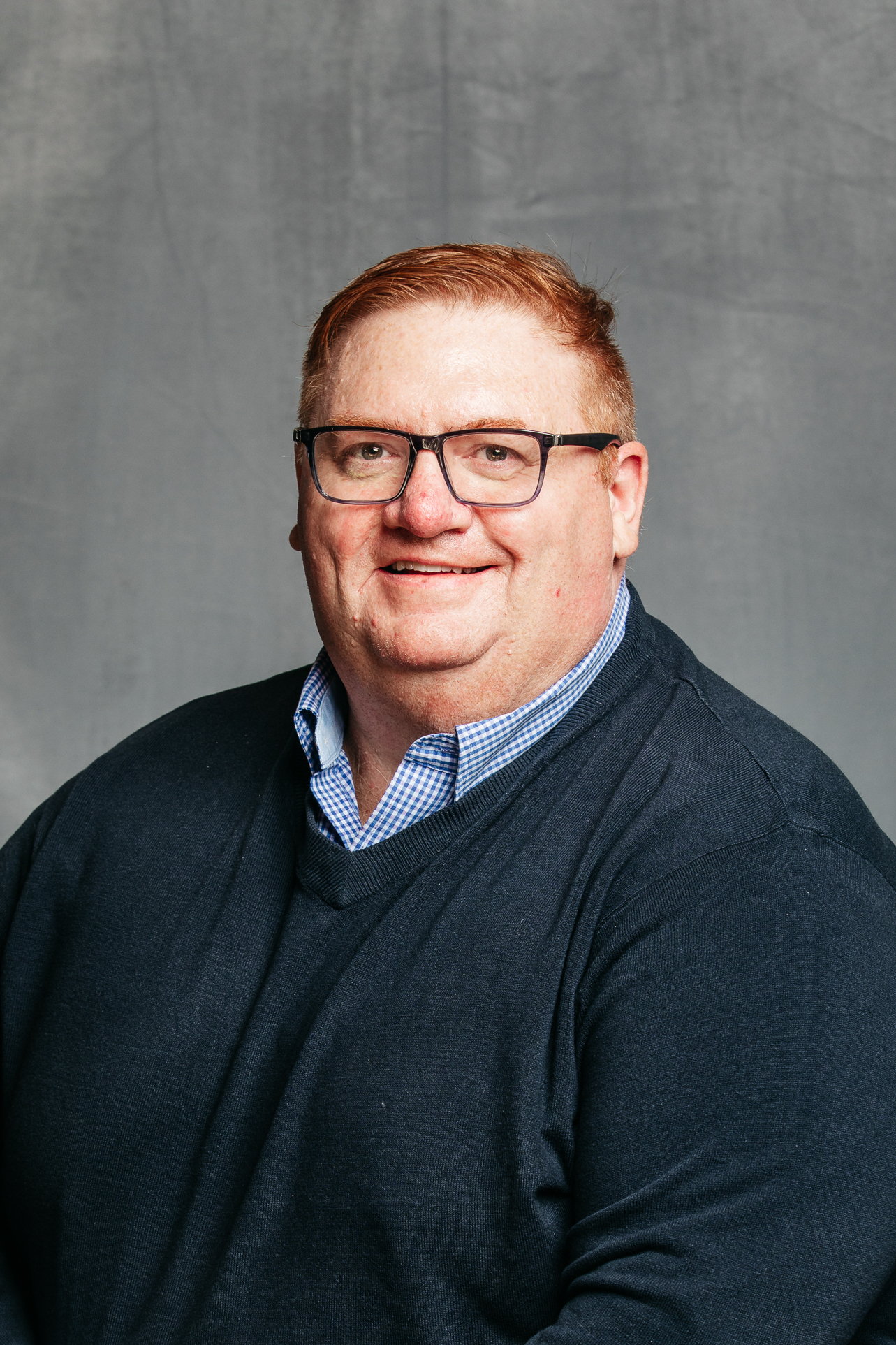

Associate Minister of Municipal Affairs and Housing
- Incumbent
- Assumed office March 19, 2025
- Premier: Doug Ford
- Preceded by: Vijay Thanigasalam

Minister of Natural Resources (Note: Known as Minister of Natural Resources & Forestry until 2024, succeeded by Nolan Quinn as Associate Minister Forestry)
- In office June 24, 2022 – March 19, 2025
- Premier: Doug Ford
- Preceded by: Greg Rickford
- Succeeded by: Mike Harris Jr.

Member of the Ontario Provincial Parliament for Parry Sound—Muskoka
- Incumbent
- Assumed office June 2, 2022
- Preceded by: Norm Miller

Mayor of Bracebridge
- In office October 25, 2010 – June 2, 2022
- Preceded by: Don Coates
- Succeeded by: Rick Maloney

Member of Bracebridge Town Council
- In office November 13, 2006 – October 25, 2010
- Constituency: At-large

Personal details
- Party: Progressive Conservative

Graydon Smith MPP is a Canadian politician, who was elected to the Legislative Assembly of Ontario in the 2022 provincial election. He represents the riding of Parry Sound—Muskoka as a member of the Progressive Conservative Party of Ontario.

Smith was formerly the mayor of Bracebridge, Ontario.

On June 24, 2022, Smith was appointed Minister of Natural Resources and Forestry by Lieutenant Governor Elizabeth Dowdeswell.

On June 6, 2024, it was announced that Smith remained the Minister of Natural Resources but no longer had responsibility for forestry.

After the 2025 Ontario general election, he was appointed as the Associate Minister of Municipal Affairs and Housing.

== Background ==
Smith grew up in Port Sydney, Ontario, where his family owned and operated a local business. He along with his father and brother were members of the Kinsmen Club of Bracebridge for many years. Smith was inspired to enter politics through his time with the Kinsmen Club and a Bracebridge councillor who encouraged him to run in 2006.

Smith is married with two children and lives in Bracebridge, Ontario.

== Political Career (2006 - present) ==
Smith began his political career in Bracebridge, Ontario as a District of Muskoka councillor in 2006. After one term as councillor, the Bracebridge mayor at the time and Smith’s mentor, Don Coates decided to retire and encouraged Smith to run for the mayorship in 2010. He won the seat and served as mayor for 12 years.

During his time as mayor, he became a board of director with the Association of Municipalities of Ontario in 2014 and was president 2021. Smith was also a board of director with the Ontario Small Urban Municipalities.

In 2022, former Parry Sound-Muskoka MPP Norm Miller announced he was retiring and would not be seeking re-election paving the way for Smith to run as the Progressive Conservative candidate. On June 2, 2022 Smith won the provincial election with about 45% of the votes. On June 24, Smith was appointed Minister of Natural Resources and Forestry.

In June 2022, Smith was criminally charged under Ontario's Endangered Species Act. Specifically, he was accused of ordering road construction which destroyed endangered Blanding's Turtle habitats during his tenure as mayor of Bracebridge. On October 25, 2022, the charges against Smith were dropped.

== Election results ==
2025 Ontario general election: Parry Sound—Muskoka
Party	Candidate	Votes	%	±%
Progressive Conservative	Graydon Smith	21,731	46.80	+1.43
Green	Matt Richter	19,360	41.69	+1.07
Liberal	David Innes	2,828	6.09	–
New Democratic	Jim Ronholm	1,329	2.86	–4.83
New Blue	Brandon Nicksy	785	1.69	–0.29
Ontario Party	Helen Kroeker	403	0.87	–2.83
Total valid votes		46,436	99.21	
Total rejected, unmarked and declined ballots		371	0.79	+0.37
Turnout		46,807	53.71	+0.62
Eligible voters		87,147		
Progressive Conservative hold		Swing		+0.18
Source: Elections Ontario

2022 Ontario general election: Parry Sound—Muskoka
Party	Candidate	Votes	%	±%	Expenditures
Progressive Conservative	Graydon Smith	20,216	45.37	–2.70	$85,536
Green	Matt Richter	18,102	40.63	+20.61	$95,858
New Democratic	Erin Horvath	3,427	7.69	–14.34	$14,568
Ontario Party	Andrew John Cocks	1,649	3.70	–	$8,029
New Blue	Doug Maynard	883	1.98	–	$2,616
Independent	Daniel Predie Jr.	155	0.35	–	$0
Populist	Brad Waddell	126	0.28	–	$3,142
Total valid votes/expense limit		44,558	99.58	–	$117,992
Total rejected, unmarked and declined ballots		187	0.42	–0.29	
Turnout		44,745	53.09	–6.12	
Eligible voters		84,280			
Progressive Conservative hold		Swing		–11.65	
Source: Elections Ontario

2018 Bracebridge mayoral election
Candidate	Votes	%
Graydon Smith	4,457	75.9%
Lory-Lynn Giaschi-Pacini	1,417	24.1%

2014 Bracebridge mayoral election
Candidate	Votes	%
Graydon Smith	5,171	84.0%
Phil Kolyn	986	16.0%

2010 Bracebridge mayoral election
Candidate	Votes	%
Graydon Smith	2,882	46.1%
Larry Stroud	1,954	31.2%
John Duck	1,422	22.7%

2006 Bracebridge municipal election: At-large (three to be elected)
Candidate	Votes	%
Scott Young	2,675	17.82%
Steven Clement	2,464	16.42%
Graydon Smith	2,428	16.18%
Barb McMurray	2,271	15.13%
Don MacKay	2,211	14.73%
John Kelly	1,247	8.31%
Tricia Hunter	1,171	7.80%
Jim Swanborough	542	3.61%
