= James Francis Kelly =

Canadian politician from Ontario

Member of the Ontario Provincial Parliament for Muskoka—Ontario
- In office June 19, 1934 – March 24, 1945
- Preceded by: George Walter Ecclestone
- Succeeded by: George Arthur Welsh

Personal details
- Party: Liberal (1937 to 1945)
- Other political affiliations: Liberal-Progressive (1934 to 1937)

James Francis Kelly was a Canadian politician who was MPP for Muskoka—Ontario from 1934 to 1945.

== See also ==
- 19th Parliament of Ontario
- 20th Parliament of Ontario
- 21st Parliament of Ontario
