= William Rabb Beatty =

Canadian politician

Ontario MPP
- In office 1894–1902
- Preceded by: James Sharpe
- Succeeded by: Joseph Milton Carr
- Constituency: Parry Sound

Personal details
- Born: June 11, 1851
- Died: February 8, 1905 (aged 53) Parry Sound, Ontario
- Party: Patrons of Industry (Liberal)
- Occupation: Businessman

William Rabb Beatty (June 11, 1851 – February 8, 1905) was an Ontario businessman and political figure. He represented Parry Sound in the Legislative Assembly of Ontario as a Liberal-Patrons of Industry member from 1894 to 1898 and as a Liberal from 1898 to 1902.

He was the manager for the Beatty Line, a steamship company operating on the Great Lakes. His brother Walter Beatty also served in the provincial assembly. Beatty lived in Parry Sound.
