= Joseph Milton Carr =

Canadian politician (1858–1929)

Ontario MPP
- In office 1902–1904
- Preceded by: William Rabb Beatty
- Succeeded by: John Galna
- Constituency: Parry Sound

Personal details
- Born: December 24, 1858 Sweaburg, Ontario
- Died: August 26, 1929 (aged 70) Toronto, Ontario
- Party: Liberal
- Spouse: Mary Street (m. 1880)
- Occupation: Businessman

Joseph Milton Carr (December 24, 1858 – August 26, 1929) was a merchant and politician in Ontario, Canada. He represented Parry Sound in the Legislative Assembly of Ontario from 1902 to 1904 as a Liberal.

The son of Thomas Carr and Adeline Alexander, he was born in Sweaburg and was educated in Woodstock. In 1880, he married Mary Street. Carr operated a general store in Powassan but moved his business to Cobalt in 1905 after silver was discovered there. His business was destroyed by fire and he became involved in mining. Carr later retired, living in Hamilton and Barrie until his wife's death around 1924, when he moved back to Powassan. He suffered heart problems and later died at the Toronto General Hospital at the age of 70.
