= Samuel Henry Armstrong =

Canadian politician

Ontario MPP
- In office 1912–1916
- Preceded by: Arthur Mahaffy
- Succeeded by: George Ecclestone
- Constituency: Muskoka

Personal details
- Born: April 9, 1855 Grey County, Canada West
- Died: May 15, 1916 (aged 61) Bracebridge, Ontario
- Party: Conservative
- Spouse: Emma Pratt (m. 1883)
- Occupation: Farmer

Samuel Henry Armstrong (April 9, 1855 – May 15, 1916) was an Ontario farmer and political figure. He represented Muskoka in the Legislative Assembly of Ontario from 1912 to 1916 as a Conservative member.

He was born in Churchill, County Fermanagh, Ireland, the son of Lennon Armstrong, was educated in Enniskillen and came to Canada in 1872. In 1883, he married Emma Pratt. He was also a cattle dealer. Armstrong served on the council for Victoria County and was the first mayor of Bracebridge, serving in that post for 11 years.
