= Norm Miller (politician) =

Canadian politician

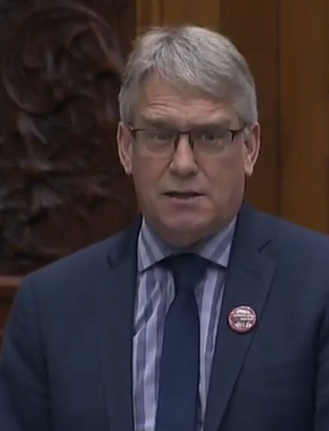

Parliamentary Assistant to the Minister of Intergovernmental Affairs
- In office June 29, 2018 – May 3, 2022
- Minister: Doug Ford

Member of the Ontario Provincial Parliament for Parry Sound—Muskoka
- In office March 22, 2001 – May 3, 2022
- Preceded by: Ernie Eves
- Succeeded by: Graydon Smith

Personal details
- Born: 1956 (age 69–70)
- Party: Progressive Conservative
- Relations: Frank Miller (Father)
- Occupation: Airline pilot

Norman Allan Miller (born 1956) is a former politician in Ontario, Canada. He was a member of the Legislative Assembly of Ontario, representing the riding of Parry Sound—Muskoka for the Progressive Conservative Party from 2001 to 2022. His father, Frank Miller, was also a Progressive Conservative MPP from the region for 11 years, and briefly served as Premier of Ontario in 1985.

== Background ==
Miller started a Muskoka Young Progressive Conservative organization in 1975, and has been active in the party since this time. He is a commercial pilot and has served as president of Muskoka Tourism.

Miller along with his wife Chris, and their children Abigail, Renne, Winston and Stuart owned and operated a lodge called Patterson Kaye between the 1980s until 2005.

== Politics ==
Miller was elected to the Ontario legislature in a 2001 by-election, called after Ernie Eves resigned his seat in the legislature; he defeated Liberal Evelyn Brown by about 4000 votes. In April 2002, Miller was appointed as Parliamentary Assistant to the Minister of Northern Development and Mines.

Miller was re-elected by an increased margin in the 2003 provincial election, although the Progressive Conservatives were reduced to only 24 out of 103 seats in the legislature as the Liberals won a commanding majority. In 2004, he supported John Tory in the latter's successful bid to succeed Eves as leader of the Progressive Conservative Party.

He was re-elected in 2007, 2011, 2014 and 2018.

In 2022, ahead of the impending election, Miller chose not to seek re-election and subsequently announced his retirement from politics. He was succeeded as the MPP for Parry Sound—Muskoka by Graydon Smith.

=== Electoral record ===
2018 Ontario general election
Party	Candidate	Votes	%	±%
Progressive Conservative	Norm Miller	22,662	48.07	+7.37
New Democratic	Erin Horvath	10,385	22.03	+9.13
Green	Matt Richter	9,438	20.02	+0.68
Liberal	Brenda Rhodes	4,071	8.64	-17.66
Independent	Jeff Mole	219	0.46	
Libertarian	Chris Packer	196	0.42	
None of the Above	Joshua MacDonald	172	0.36	
Total valid votes		47,143	100	
Turnout			61.7	
Eligible voters		76,385		
Progressive Conservative hold		Swing		
Source: Elections Ontario

2014 Ontario general election
Party	Candidate	Votes	%	±%
Progressive Conservative	Norm Miller	15,752	40.70	-13.39
Liberal	Dan Waters	10,177	26.30	+8.09
Green	Matt Richter	7,484	19.34	+10.28
New Democratic	Clyde Mobbley	4,993	12.90	-5.28
Freedom	Andy Stivrins	296	0.76	+0.29
Total valid votes		38,702	100.00	
Progressive Conservative hold		Swing		-10.74
Source: Elections Ontario

2011 Ontario general election
Party	Candidate	Votes	%	±%
Progressive Conservative	Norm Miller	19,417	54.09	+6.92
Liberal	Cindy Waters	6,537	18.21	-8.50
New Democratic	Alex Zyganiuk	6,527	18.18	+4.54
Green	Matt Richter	3,251	9.06	-3.42
Freedom	Andy Stivrins	167	0.47	
Total valid votes		35,896	100.0	
Total rejected, unmarked and declined ballots		171	0.47	
Turnout		36,070	51.79	
Eligible voters		69,651		
Progressive Conservative hold		Swing		+7.71
Source: Elections Ontario

2007 Ontario general election
Party	Candidate	Votes	%	±%
Progressive Conservative	Norm Miller	17,343	47.17	-1.34
Liberal	Brenda Rhodes	9,819	26.71	-7.73
New Democratic	Sara Hall	5,015	13.64	+3.72
Green	Matt Richter	4,589	12.48	+6.6
Total valid votes		36,766	100.0	

2003 Ontario general election
Party	Candidate	Votes	%	±%
Progressive Conservative	Norm Miller	18,776	48.51	-0.79
Liberal	Dan Waters	13,332	34.44	+0.13
New Democratic	Jo-Anne Boulding	3,838	9.92	+6.53
Green	Glen Hodgson	2,277	5.88	-6.46
Family Coalition	Charlene Phinney	484	1.25	
Total valid votes		38,707	100.0	

Ontario provincial by-election, February 8, 2001
Party	Candidate	Votes	%	±%
Progressive Conservative	Norm Miller	12,903	49.30	-8.67
Liberal	Evelyn Brown	8,979	34.31	+6.62
Green	Richard Thomas	3,229	12.34	
New Democratic	Joanne Bury	888	3.39	-10.1
Independent	Anne Marsden	113	0.43	
Independent	John Turmel	61	0.23	
Total valid votes		26,173	100.0	
