= Anti-Drug Secretariat (Ontario) =

Canadian politician

The Anti-Drug Secretariat was a provincial government agency in Ontario, Canada, from 1989 to 1992. It was led by a member of the Executive Council of Ontario, who was styled as the Minister responsible for the provincial anti-drug strategy.

The first minister to hold this position was Ken Black, who also served as Minister of Tourism and Recreation in the government of David Peterson. Black had previously authored a report on the province's anti-drug strategy and served as the premier's advisor on drug issues. Following his appointment, he was responsible for coordinating anti-drug strategies within seven government ministries.

The agency was restructured as the Office of Substance Abuse Strategy in 1992. It appears to have been quietly phased out in 1993, with most of its responsibilities transferred to the Ministry of Health.

== Ministers responsible for the provincial anti-drug strategy ==
Name	Party	Took office	Left office
Ken Black	Liberal	1989	1990
Mike Farnan	New Democratic Party	1990	1991
Frances Lankin	New Democratic Party	1991	1992

== Ministers responsible for the substance abuse strategy ==
Name	Party	Took office	Left office
Frances Lankin	New Democratic Party	1992	1993
