= John Classon Miller =

Canadian politician

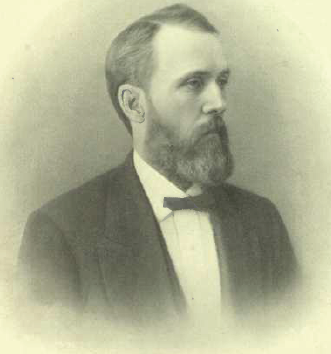

Ontario MPP
- In office 1875–1882
- Preceded by: New riding
- Succeeded by: James Whitney Bettes
- Constituency: Muskoka and Parry Sound

Personal details
- Born: December 16, 1836 Leeds County, Upper Canada
- Died: April 2, 1884 (aged 47) Colton, California
- Party: Liberal
- Spouse: Adelaide Augusta Chamberlain (m. 1859)
- Occupation: Lumber merchant

John Classon Miller (December 16, 1836 – April 2, 1884) was an Ontario lumber merchant and political figure. He represented Muskoka and Parry Sound in the Legislative Assembly of Ontario from 1875 to 1882 as a Liberal member.

He was born in Yonge Township, Leeds County, Upper Canada in 1836 and entered business as a merchant at Seeleys Bay. Miller served as deputy sheriff for the United Counties of Leeds and Grenville. In 1859, he married Adelaide Augusta Chamberlain. He moved to Toronto and was employed by the Ontario Crown Lands Department from 1868 to 1871, acting as superintendent of woods and forests. He then, with others, purchased timber rights and a sawmill at Parry Sound, forming the Parry Sound Lumber Company. In 1877, he became the owner and general manager for the company, which soon grew to become one of the most important businesses in the region.

Miller's election to the legislative assembly in 1875 was declared invalid on appeal; this decision was then overturned by the Court of Error and Appeal in 1876. He was reelected in 1879 but resigned in 1882 to contest the federal seat, losing to William Edward O'Brien by three votes.

He died of tuberculosis in Colton, California in 1884 and was buried at Parry Sound.

His son John Bellamy took over the operation of the lumber company which continued to operate until 1931.

== Electoral history ==
1875 Ontario general election: Muskoka and Parry Sound
Party	Candidate	Votes	%
Liberal	John Classon Miller	839	58.63
Conservative	J. Long	592	41.37
Total valid votes		1,431	65.52
Eligible voters		2,184	
Liberal pickup new district.			
Source: Elections Ontario

1879 Ontario general election: Muskoka and Parry Sound
Party	Candidate	Votes	%	±%
Liberal	John Classon Miller	1,704	57.98	−0.65
Conservative	Mr. Boys	1,235	42.02	+0.65
Total valid votes		2,939	74.90	+9.38
Eligible voters		3,924		
Liberal hold		Swing		−0.65
Source: Elections Ontario
