= Ken Black =

Canadian politician (1932–2016)

Ontario MPP
- In office 1987–1990
- Preceded by: Frank Miller (Note: Riding name changed from Muskoka.)
- Succeeded by: Dan Waters
- Constituency: Muskoka–Georgian Bay

Personal details
- Born: March 11, 1932; Bracebridge, Ontario
- Died: August 29, 2016 (aged 84); Bracebridge, Ontario
- Political party: Liberal
- Spouse: Beth
- Children: 4
- Occupation: Teacher

Kenneth Hilton Black (March 11, 1932 – August 29, 2016) was a Canadian politician. He was a Liberal member in the Legislative Assembly of Ontario from 1987 to 1990, and represented the central Ontario riding of Muskoka–Georgian Bay. He served as a cabinet minister in the government of David Peterson.

== Background ==
Black was born in Bracebridge, Ontario and graduated from the University of Toronto in 1955. He was a secondary school teacher and principal from 1958 to 1980, and was superintendent of the Muskoka Board of Education from 1980 to 1987. He has also served as past president of Muskoka Children's Aid. He and his wife, Beth raised four children.

== Politician ==
Black joined the Ontario Liberal Party in 1985. He was elected to the Ontario legislature in the 1987 provincial election defeating Progressive Conservative candidate George Beatty in Muskoka–Georgian Bay, a new riding created by redistribution. Previously the area was represented by the riding of Muskoka which had been held by former Progressive Conservative premier Frank Miller until 1987, and the PCs were historically the dominant party in the area. Black was considered a strong candidate, however, and his victory was not entirely unexpected. Black credited his victory to a strong campaign team, popular satisfaction with Liberal leader David Peterson, and the fact that some local PCs were unhappy with party leader Larry Grossman.

In August 1988, Peterson appointed Black as a one-man task force to review government and non-government programs against drug abuse. His report, issued in mid-October, recommended mandatory drug education starting in the early grades, drug treatment and education programs for offenders, increased training about drugs for social workers and health care workers, and the addition of about thirty-six officers to the provincial drug unit. Black criticized the "zero tolerance" approach of the American "war on drugs", arguing that it was largely ineffective.

After the report's release, Black was named special advisor to the premier on drugs with responsibility for co-ordinating and monitoring all government programs against drug abuse. In December 1988, he announced a pilot project for substance abuse counselling operated by the YMCA of Metropolitan Toronto.

Black was promoted to the provincial cabinet on August 2, 1989, serving as Minister of Tourism and Recreation and also responsible for the provincial anti-drug strategy. He introduced a new provincial anti-drug strategy in November 1989 that fulfilled some of his previous recommendations, including the hiring of more police officers and the introduction of early education programs. It also allocated $4.5 million for community-based pilot projects against drug abuse. In June 1990, heannounced that this funding would be targeted to projects in nine communities.

Black was critical of the federal Goods and Services Tax introduced by the government of Brian Mulroney, arguing that it would put Ontario's tourism sector at risk of losing jobs and revenue. Tourism in Ontario declined in this period, due in large part to a continental economic downtown.

Black travelled to Paris in December 1989 to support Toronto's bid to host Expo 2000. Toronto lost the bid Hanover, West Germany.

Black's time in cabinet was brief. The Liberals suffered an upset loss to the New Democratic Party in the 1990 provincial election, and Black finished third in his bid for re-election. In 1991-92, he was chief organizer for Charles Beer's unsuccessful bid to succeed Peterson as leader of the Ontario Liberal Party. He attempted to return to the provincial legislature in the 1995 election, but finished well behind Progressive Conservative candidate Bill Grimmett.

=== Cabinet positions ===
Ontario provincial government of David Peterson
Cabinet post (1)
Predecessor	Office	Successor
Hugh O'Neil	Minister of Tourism and Recreation; 1989-1990; Also responsible for anti-drug strategy	Peter North

== Later life ==
Black later served as president of the Muskoka Heritage Foundation, and founded the Muskoka Watershed Council in 2001. He was appointed as a director of the Toront03 Alliance in July 2003. On August 29, 2016 he died from an undiagnosed case of acute leukemia at the South Muskoka Memorial Hospital in Bracebridge, Ontario.

== Electoral record ==
1995 Ontario general election: Muskoka–Georgian Bay
Party	Candidate	Votes	%	±%	Expenditures
Progressive Conservative	Bill Grimmett	17,864	51.79	+19.99	$40,807
Liberal	Ken Black	8,095	23.47	−4.10	$41,201
New Democratic	Dan Waters	7,742	22.45	−18.18	$26,533
Green	Michael Fenton	411	1.19	–	$330
Independent	Bill Ogilvie	381	1.10		$295
Total valid votes		34,493	100.00		
Rejected, unmarked and declined ballots		340			
Turnout		34,833	65.50	−2.15	
Electors on the lists		53,179			

1990 Ontario general election: Muskoka–Georgian Bay
Party	Candidate	Votes	%	±%
New Democratic	Dan Waters	13,422	40.63	+16.37
Progressive Conservative	Marilyn Rowe	10,504	31.80	−0.49
Liberal	Ken Black	9,105	27.57	−15.88
Total valid votes		33,031	100.00	
Total rejected, unmarked and declined ballots		307		
Turnout		33,338	67.65	+2.48
Electors on the lists		49,279		

1987 Ontario general election: Muskoka–Georgian Bay
Party	Candidate	Votes	%	±%
Liberal	Ken Black	12,645	43.45	
Progressive Conservative	George Beatty	9,396	32.39	
New Democratic	Dan Waters	7,059	24.26	
Total valid votes		29,100	100.00	
Total rejected, unmarked and declined ballots		320		
Turnout		29,420	65.17	
Electors on the lists		45,146		
