= Allister Johnston =

Canadian politician

Allie Johnston

Ontario MPP
- In office 1948–1971
- Preceded by: Charles Cragg
- Succeeded by: Lorne Maeck
- Constituency: Parry Sound

Personal details
- Born: March 19, 1908 Sunridge, Ontario, Canada
- Died: August 21, 2005 (aged 97) Toronto, Ontario, Canada
- Party: Progressive Conservative
- Spouse: Margaret
- Children: 3
- Occupation: Insurance broker

Military service
- Allegiance: Canadian
- Branch/service: Royal Canadian Artillery
- Years of service: 1941-1945
- Rank: Lt. Colonel
- Unit: The Algonquin Regiment
- Battles/wars: Normandy Invasion, France, Belgium

Allister "Allie" Johnston (March 19, 1908 – August 21, 2005) was a politician in Ontario, Canada. He was a Progressive Conservative member of the Legislative Assembly of Ontario from 1948 to 1971 who represented the riding of Parry Sound.

== Background ==
Johnston was born in Sunridge, Ontario. During the Second World War, Johnston served as a Major in The Algonquin Regiment, a light infantry regiment which saw action in Normandy, northern France and Belgium. After the war, he rose to become Lt. Colonel of the Regiment. After the war, Johnston established an insurance company in South River, W.A. Johnston Insurance, which is still operated by his two sons. He was active in a wide variety of charitable organizations, including serving as President of the local branch of the Royal Canadian Legion.

== Politics ==
Johnston served as a municipal councillor in the village of South River, Ontario, and as a trustee and then Chair of the South River School Board.

He was elected to the provincial legislature in a December 1948 by-election when Charles Cragg, the member who won the 1948 provincial election in June died suddenly after only two months in office. He was re-elected five times and served for a total of 24 years before retiring in 1971. He was one of the longest-serving MPP's in the Ontario history. In addition to his service on Legislative Committees, he was appointed as a Commissioner on the Ontario Northland Transportation Commission.
