= Lorne Maeck =

Canadian politician

Ontario MPP
- In office 1971–1981
- Preceded by: Allister Johnston
- Succeeded by: Ernie Eves
- Constituency: Parry Sound

Personal details
- Born: Lorne Howard Maeck; March 7, 1926 South River, Ontario
- Died: May 5, 2014 (aged 88) North Bay, Ontario
- Party: Progressive Conservative
- Spouse: Ivy
- Children: 3
- Occupation: Police detective

Lorne Howard Maeck (March 7, 1926 – May 5, 2014) was a politician in Ontario, Canada. He was a Progressive Conservative member of the Legislative Assembly of Ontario from 1971 to 1981 who represented the riding of Parry Sound. He served as a cabinet minister in the government of Bill Davis.

== Background ==
Born to a poor family in a rural area near South River, Ont., Maeck left school after Grade 10 education and, at age 17 and a half, joined the Royal Canadian Air Force where he served as a wireless air gunner during the Second World War. After returning to Canada, Maeck enlisted in the OPP where he rose to the rank of Detective. He established successful businesses in his community, including a gas station, a bus company and a furniture store. His first political involvement was as a Councillor and later as Reeve of the Village of South River before being elected to the Ontario legislature. Maeck and his wife of 62 years, Ivy, who died in 2011, had three children. Maeck retired to North Bay in 2010 and died there on May 5, 2014.

== Politics ==
In 1971, he turned his attention to provincial politics. After winning the elections in 1971, 1975, and 1977, he served in the 29th, the 30th and the 31st Legislative Assemblies in Ontario. Maeck was recognized for his advocacy for local projects and served on numerous standing committees at the Legislative Assembly. He was Parliamentary Assistant to two ministers, served as the Government Whip, finally, was appointed as the Minister of Revenue, a post he held at the time of his retirement, in 1981.

Maeck chose to retire from provincial politics and relinquished the Progressive Conservative nomination, for the 1981 general election, in favour of a young lawyer from Parry Sound, Ernie Eves. Aside from being an extremely popular Member of Provincial Parliament, Maeck held a variety of other jobs over the course of his life, including being an OPP detective, entrepreneur, volunteer and politician.

=== Cabinet positions ===
Davis ministry, Province of Ontario (1971–1985)
Cabinet post (1)
Predecessor	Office	Successor
Margaret Scrivener	Minister of Revenue; 1978–1981	George Ashe
