= Joseph Edgar =

Canadian politician

Ontario MPP
- In office 1914–1919
- Preceded by: John Galna
- Succeeded by: Richard Reese Hall
- Constituency: Parry Sound

Personal details
- Born: June 7, 1856 Benraw, Ireland
- Died: September 10, 1922 (aged 66) Businessman
- Party: Conservative
- Spouse: Mary Little (m. 1886)
- Children: Mary S. Edgar, Bessie Edgar, Annie Edgar, Margaret Edgar, and 4 that died

Joseph Edgar (June 7, 1856 – September 10, 1922) was an Irish-born merchant and political figure in Ontario. He represented Parry Sound in the Legislative Assembly of Ontario from 1914 to 1919 as a Conservative member.

He was born in Benraw, County Down, the son of Joseph Edgar and May McCracken, and came to Canada in 1872. In 1886, Edgar married Mary Little. He moved to Sundridge, a small town north of Toronto on the rail line. He ran unsuccessfully for a seat in the Ontario assembly in 1902. Edgar owned a general store which he had bought from John Carter. He was defeated by Richard Reese Hall when he ran for re-election in 1919.
