= Jacob William Dill =

Canadian politician

Ontario MPP
- In office 1884–1886
- Preceded by: Frederick G. Fauquier
- Succeeded by: George Marter (Note: Riding name changed to Muskoka)
- Constituency: Muskoka and Parry Sound

Personal details
- Born: September 3, 1840 Preston, Waterloo County, Upper Canada
- Died: September 23, 1920 (aged 80) near Vernon, British Columbia
- Party: Liberal
- Occupation: Merchant

Jacob William Dill (September 3, 1840 – September 23, 1920) was an Ontario merchant and political figure. He represented Muskoka and Parry Sound in the Legislative Assembly of Ontario as a Liberal member from 1884 to 1886.

He was born in Preston, Waterloo County, Upper Canada in 1840. He worked for Jacob Hespeler in Preston before moving to Pembroke where he worked for a firm of general merchants. In 1868, he married Mary Annie Wright. Dill later moved to Bracebridge where he went into business for himself. He served on the village council and was reeve from 1878 to 1879 and from 1882 to 1883. In 1882, he served as warden for Victoria County. Dill was elected to the Ontario assembly after Frederick G. Fauquier was disqualified in 1884. He was treasurer for the Muskoka District Agricultural Society and was also secretary for the Muskoka lodge of the Freemasons. He died of heart failure aboard a westbound train near Vernon, British Columbia.
