= Ernie Eves =

23rd Premier of Ontario

The Honourable Ernie Eves OOnt ECO KC
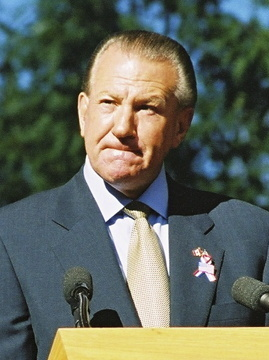
- Eves in 2002

23rd Premier of Ontario
- In office April 15, 2002 – October 22, 2003
- Monarch: Elizabeth II
- Lieutenant Governor: James Bartleman
- Deputy: Elizabeth Witmer
- Preceded by: Mike Harris
- Succeeded by: Dalton McGuinty

5th Deputy Premier of Ontario
- In office June 26, 1995 – February 8, 2001
- Premier: Mike Harris
- Preceded by: Floyd Laughren
- Succeeded by: Jim Flaherty

Leader of the Official Opposition
- In office October 23, 2003 – September 28, 2004
- Preceded by: Dalton McGuinty
- Succeeded by: Bob Runciman

Leader of the Progressive Conservative Party of Ontario
- In office March 23, 2002 – September 18, 2004
- Preceded by: Mike Harris
- Succeeded by: John Tory

Member of the Ontario Provincial Parliament
- In office May 2, 2002 – January 31, 2005
- Preceded by: David Tilson
- Succeeded by: John Tory
- Constituency: Dufferin—Peel—Wellington—Grey
- In office June 3, 1999 – February 8, 2001
- Preceded by: Constituency established
- Succeeded by: Norm Miller
- Constituency: Parry Sound—Muskoka
- In office March 19, 1981 – June 3, 1999
- Preceded by: Lorne Maeck
- Succeeded by: Constituency abolished
- Constituency: Parry Sound

Personal details
- Born: Ernest Larry Eves; June 17, 1946 (age 80) Windsor, Ontario, Canada
- Party: Progressive Conservative
- Spouse: Vicki Eves (m. 1976; div. 1999)
- Domestic partner: Isabel Bassett (1999–)
- Children: 2
- Education: University of Toronto; Osgoode Hall Law School

Ernest Larry Eves OOnt ECO KC (born June 17, 1946) is a Canadian lawyer and former politician who served as the 23rd premier of Ontario from 2002 to 2003. A Progressive Conservative, he took over the premiership upon Mike Harris's resignation as party leader, but the party was defeated in the 2003 election by the Liberals, under Dalton McGuinty.

Eves was born in Windsor, Ontario, to a working-class family. He studied law at Osgoode Hall Law School and practised law in his own firm, Green & Eves. He was elected in the northern Ontario riding of Parry Sound in 1981 by a margin of six votes but retained the seat for 20 years. He served briefly as a cabinet minister in the short-lived government of Frank Miller in 1985, but he was consigned to the opposition benches when the Tories were defeated in a motion of no confidence by an alliance of the opposition Liberal and New Democrats. He remained in opposition until 1995, when the Tories returned to power under Mike Harris, who appointed Eves as his Deputy Premier and Minister of Finance. Family tragedy and marital problems led to his resignation from the legislature in 2001.

After a brief return to the private sector, Eves returned to politics when Harris resigned in 2002. He won the party leadership and regained a seat in the legislature after winning a by-election in the central Ontario riding of Dufferin—Peel—Wellington—Grey. His tenure as premier was short, as his party was defeated 16 months later in the 2003 election, which saw the PC party lose 35 of its 59 seats. He resigned as leader in 2004 and retired from the legislature on January 31, 2005.

In 2007, Eves was appointed as Chairman of Jacob Securities Inc., a Toronto-based financial services company. He served in that position until July 2012.

== Early life and career ==
Eves was born into a working-class family in Windsor, Ontario, in 1946, the son of Julie (née Hawrelechko) and Harry Lewis Eves, a factory worker. His maternal grandparents were Ukrainian. As a teenager, Eves moved with his family to the central Ontario town of Parry Sound. Eves went to Osgoode Hall Law School, was called to the bar in 1972, and practiced with the firm of Green and Eves. In 1981, he ran for provincial parliament in the riding of Parry Sound. He defeated Liberal candidate Richard Thomas by only six votes, leading to the nickname "Landslide Ernie", and went on to keep the seat for twenty years.

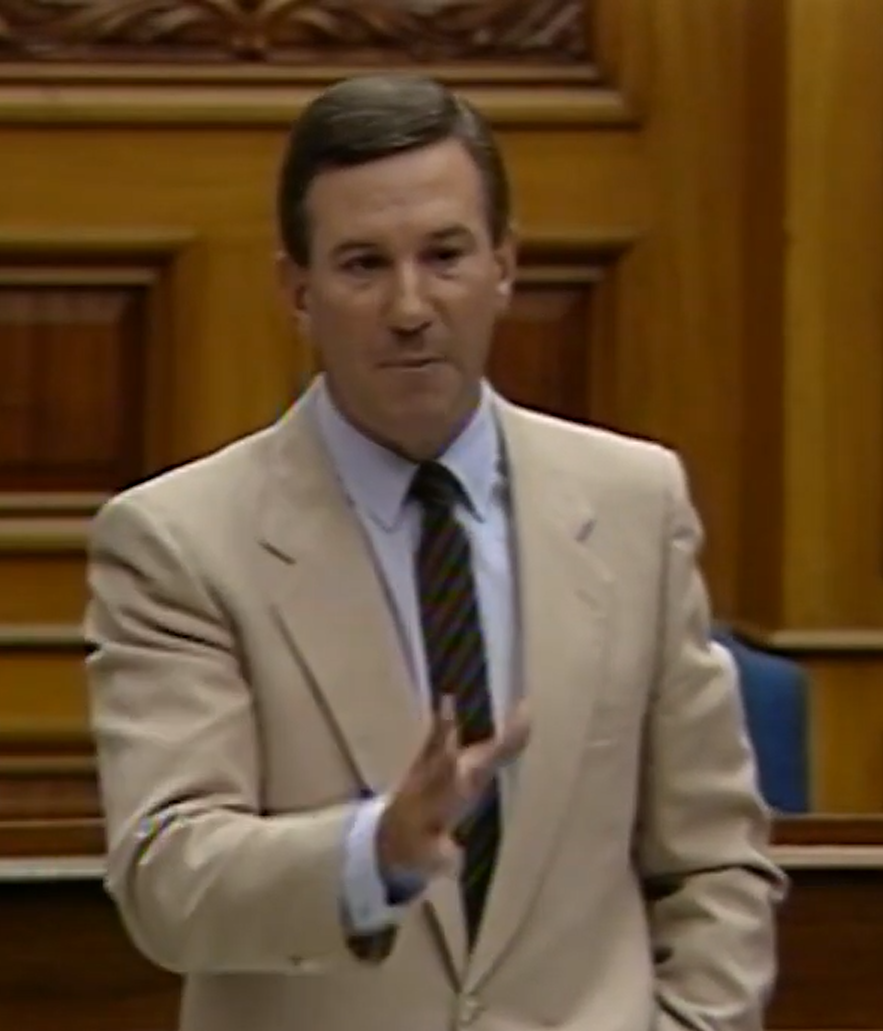
Eves speaking during Question Period, 1987

Eves was a cabinet minister in the short-lived government of Frank Miller, serving as Provincial Secretary for Resources Development from February 8 to March 22, 1985, Minister of Skills Development from March 22 to May 17, 1985, and Minister of Community and Social Services from May 17 to June 26, 1985. As Minister of Skills Development, Eves was also the minister responsible for Native Affairs. In this capacity, he made history in 1985 by proclaiming Ontario as favouring native self-government. He left cabinet on the defeat of the Miller ministry in the legislature, and served as an opposition Member of Provincial Parliament (MPP) until the Progressive Conservatives returned to power in 1995.

== Harris years ==
Eves is a long time close friend of fellow northern Ontario MPP Mike Harris. In 1990, Eves backed Harris' bid for the party leadership. In 1995, after being elected on the "Common Sense Revolution", a program of tax cuts and government cutbacks, Eves was appointed Harris' Minister of Finance and Deputy Premier.

In Finance, Eves supervised significant cuts to taxes and public spending, particularly in the field of social assistance. Provincial income taxes were cut by 30% and welfare rates were reduced by 22%, resulting in 500,000 people being cut from the Ontario welfare rolls. There were also cuts to education and health services. The Harris government justified these measures as necessary to eliminate the provincial deficit.

After initially adopting a policy of restraint toward health care costs, Eves' later budgets increased health spending. He eventually succeeded in balancing the budget early in the government's second term.

As Minister of Finance, Eves also oversaw two privatization initiatives: the long-term lease of the Bruce nuclear generating station to British Energy and the 99-year lease of Highway 407 to a consortium of mainly foreign investors.

Upon his retirement, Eves claimed that the impact of his 22% reduction in welfare rates "kept him up at night". There have also been reports that Eves was conflicted about the risks of adding $22 billion to the provincial debt by cutting taxes before balancing the budget. Some believe that Eves was responsible for restraining some of Harris' more radical initiatives during their time in office.

Despite the close friendship and similar backgrounds and beliefs of Harris and Eves, the two have very different public personae. While Harris tried to be the embodiment of a grass-roots politician, Eves was just the opposite. He was always meticulously well-turned-out in expensive suits, with court-filings revealing he spent $25,000 a year on clothing, $5,000 a year on jewelry and cufflinks and $700 a month on dry cleaning. Eves also sported a slicked-back hair style that reinforced his image as a "slick" politician.

Eves' personal life in the last few years of the Harris government was tumultuous. His son, Justin, was killed in a traffic accident in Parry Sound, and soon afterward his long-standing marriage broke down. Eves began a relationship with a fellow cabinet colleague, Isabel Bassett, and he and his wife separated. On February 8, 2001 Eves decided to resign from his post of Finance Minister to seek opportunities in the private sector. He became vice-chair of the investment bank Credit Suisse First Boston and senior partner at a prominent Toronto law firm.

In a March 2001 by-election, he was replaced as MPP for the riding of Parry Sound—Muskoka by Norm Miller, son of former Premier Frank Miller.

== Return to politics ==
Eves' retirement was brief. When Mike Harris stepped down as Conservative leader, he ran in the 2002 Ontario Progressive Conservative leadership election. He immediately became the front-runner and most PC MPPs and members of the party came to support him. He staved off a determined run by his successor at Finance, Jim Flaherty, who pushed a hard-right agenda to appeal to the party's grassroots. Flaherty's campaign featured scathing attacks on Eves, calling him a "serial waffler" and a "pale, pink imitation of Dalton McGuinty". He became leader of the Progressive Conservative Party of Ontario on March 23, 2002 despite not holding a seat at the time, following a second-ballot victory.

== Premier ==
Eves was sworn in as Ontario's 23rd Premier on April 15, 2002, and returned to the legislature as the member for Dufferin—Peel—Wellington—Grey after a by-election on May 2, 2002.

Reforms were made to the power system. Cost over-runs at nuclear reactors and a very hot summer combined with problems in market regulation to drive hydro prices up significantly (particularly in northern Ontario). The government was forced to cancel the privatization and capped hydro rates below cost, billing the taxpayers hundreds of millions of dollars.

In late 2002, cabinet minister Cam Jackson was forced to resign when the Liberals alleged he had spent more than $100,000 on meals and alcohol in expensive restaurants and in four star Toronto hotels. Jackson was later fully exonerated of allegations of wrongdoing. Eves was also caught unaware when the Liberals broke that Mike Harris had arranged a secret tax break for professional sports teams on his last day in office.

In December 2002, a coroner's inquest into the death of Kimberly Rogers recommended numerous changes to the government's welfare legislation, which Community and Social Services Minister, Brenda Elliott, dismissed as unnecessary tinkering with a system that "was working effectively".

Concerned about returning to the legislature, Eves' advisors hatched a plan that turned out to be a public relations disaster. They convinced the Premier to have the Minister of Finance, Janet Ecker, present the government's March 2003 budget at a televised press conference at the headquarters of auto parts maker Magna International, instead of in the legislature. Magna's CEO, Belinda Stronach, was prominent PC supporter, who later became a Liberal cabinet minister at the federal level. The "Magna Budget" resulted in accusations that the government was trying to avoid the scrutiny of the legislature and was flouting centuries of parliamentary tradition in favour of a PR stunt. Furthermore, the expense of the move was condemned as a waste of money, considering that the legislative chamber was already equipped with video equipment for televised coverage.

The "Magna Budget" was intended to launch a provincial election campaign, but was so poorly received that the election was delayed until the autumn. Attacks came from not only the opposition parties and the media but from one of Eves' own party members, Gary Carr. As Speaker of the legislature, Carr ruled that the government's actions were prima facie in contempt of the legislature. (Subsequently, the PC majority in the Legislature voted to overturn Carr's ruling.) The budget also included several assumptions that led many commentators to believe the government was in fact running a deficit in the range of $2 billion.

On 10 June, the Eves cabinet selected judge Archie Campbell to chair its SARS Commission inquiry into the failures of the health system, after the virus that caused the SARS epidemic was transmitted on 23 February from China to Toronto, where it wreaked havoc, including from 7 March at Scarborough Grace Hospital.

Soon after the budget, Energy Minister Chris Stockwell ran into trouble when he allowed a company he regulated to pay for a family trip to Europe. After several weeks of front-page news on the scandal and an unfavourable ruling from the province's Integrity Commissioner, Eves forced Stockwell to resign on 17 June.

In the summer of 2003, the power issue caused further trouble for Eves. During its time in office, the PC government had failed to make any substantial investments in new sources of power. Warm weather and the use of air conditioners pushed the Ontario hydro grid to the brink, and after the Northeast blackout of 2003, the provincial power utility was forced to buy expensive power from neighbouring producers in Quebec. During that time, Eves made daily television appearances announcing developments in the situation, and appealing to the public to conserve as much electricity as possible during the period. As a result of that exposure, Eves enjoyed a moderate uptick in the polls.

A highlight of his premiership was his meeting with Ukrainian opposition leader Victor Yushchenko in May 2003. During Yushchenko's visit to Toronto, a banquet was organized by the Ukrainian Canadian Congress, attended by over 1,000 people. Yushchenko was welcomed by "the members of the Canadian political elite in Toronto, headed by Premier of Ontario Ernie Eves", who was described as a leading Canadian of Ukrainian heritage, as well as federal cabinet minister Sheila Copps, Bishop Augustine Eugene Hornyak, Senator A. Raynell Andreychuk and City Councillor Gloria Lindsay Luby.

== 2003 election ==
In September 2003, Eves called an election for October 2, 2003. While exposure from the blackout had boosted the PCs into a short-lived tie with Dalton McGuinty's Liberals in the polls. The Tories had released their platform, "The Road Ahead", in May. When a PC campaign staffer distributed a press release referring to McGuinty as an "evil reptilian kitten-eater from another planet", many voters were turned off by the attack.

In contrast, the Liberals ran a highly focused, disciplined campaign on the simple theme of "Choose Change". They had spent the last four years positioning themselves as the government in waiting. McGuinty appeared ready for the office of Premier and tapped into voter frustration over deteriorating public services and the needless conflict of the Harris/Eves governments. Eves was unable to revive support for his party in the final days of the campaign.

On October 2, 2003, the Liberals won 72 of the 103 seats in the Legislature, and Eves' Tories won just 24. He won his own seat by the largest margin of any PC candidate.

== Resignation ==
Eves' time as Opposition leader was more fruitful, when he led attacks against the McGuinty government's first budget, particularly the Ontario Health Premium —which broke the Liberals' campaign pledge not to raise taxes and the elimination of health services such as eye examinations and physical therapy. Despite being considered a lame-duck leader, Eves led in opinion polls for that period of time.

In early 2004, Eves announced his intention to resign prior to the fall 2004 legislative session. A leadership election chose John Tory as Eves' successor on September 18, 2004; Eves was officially neutral in the contest. Tory and Eves shared a number of attributes, both coming from the so-called Red Tory wing of the party.

Eves had been widely expected to resign his seat in the provincial legislature during the 2004 Christmas holidays in order to allow Tory an opportunity to enter the Ontario legislature through a by-election. Eves' resignation was not forthcoming. After staff in Tory's office leaked Eves' impending resignation, Eves refused to resign, thereby undercutting the new leader's credibility. Another report contends that Eves was refusing to resign before securing an appointment to the Canadian Senate or to a public board. As federal and provincial patronage appointments were in the hands of Liberals, it would have been difficult for John Tory to persuade either the provincial or federal government to make such an appointment.

On January 31, 2005, Eves resigned his seat in the provincial legislature. Although he had received several high-profile job offers from the private sector after stepping down as leader, he had reportedly turned them down. In 2007, he joined Jacob & Company Securities Inc. (now Jacob Securities Inc.), a Toronto-based boutique investment bank that specializes in the renewable energy and clean technology sectors, where he served as Executive Chairman until July 2012.

== Career in cannabis ==
In 2015, Eves became chairman of Timeless Herbal Care, a medical cannabis firm in Jamaica.

== Federal politics ==
For many years, Eves was known as the most prominent supporter of the federal Progressive Conservative Party in Mike Harris's government. He had supported Joe Clark from the first ballot at the party's 1976 leadership convention, and continued to support the federal Tories in the 1990s despite the rise of the Reform Party as a rival right-wing force. He endorsed Hugh Segal's bid for the leadership of the federal party in 1998.

Eves took out a membership in the Canadian Alliance in 2000 to support Tom Long's leadership bid, but rejoined the Tories after Stockwell Day was chosen as the Canadian Alliance leader. During the 2002 Ontario PC Party leadership race, Eves and his supporters invited federal PC Party leader Joe Clark to attend as an honorary delegate. No such invitation was extended by any camp to the newly named Canadian Alliance leader Stephen Harper, who attended the provincial PC convention in late 2004 as leader of the Conservative Party of Canada.

Harris ministry, Province of Ontario (1995–2002)
Cabinet posts (2)
Predecessor	Office	Successor
Floyd Laughren	Deputy Premier of Ontario; 1995–2001	Jim Flaherty
Floyd Laughren	Minister of Finance; 1995–2001	Jim Flaherty
Special Parliamentary Responsibilities
Predecessor	Title	Successor
David Cooke	Government House Leader; 1995–1996	David Johnson
