= Frank Miller (Canadian politician) =

19th Premier of Ontario (1927–2000)

Frank Miller OOnt
- The Hon. Frank Stuart Miller

19th Premier of Ontario
- In office February 8, 1985 – June 26, 1985
- Monarch: Elizabeth II
- Lieutenant Governor: John Black Aird
- Deputy: Bob Welch; Bette Stephenson
- Preceded by: Bill Davis
- Succeeded by: David Peterson

Leader of the Ontario PC Party
- In office January 26, 1985 – November 22, 1985
- Preceded by: Bill Davis
- Succeeded by: Larry Grossman

Leader of the Official Opposition
- In office July 2, 1985 – November 22, 1985
- Preceded by: David Peterson
- Succeeded by: Larry Grossman

Ontario MPP
- In office October 21, 1971 – September 10, 1987
- Preceded by: Robert Boyer
- Succeeded by: Ken Black (Note: Riding renamed to Muskoka–Georgian Bay.)
- Constituency: Muskoka

Personal details
- Born: Frank Stuart Miller; May 14, 1927 Toronto, Ontario, Canada
- Died: July 21, 2000 (aged 73) Bracebridge, Ontario, Canada
- Resting place: Lakeview Cemetery, Gravenhurst
- Party: Progressive Conservative
- Children: Norm Miller

Frank Stuart Miller OOnt (May 14, 1927 – July 21, 2000) was a Canadian politician who served as the 19th premier of Ontario for four months in 1985. He was elected to the Legislative Assembly of Ontario in 1971 as a Progressive Conservative member of the central Ontario riding of Muskoka. He served in the cabinet of Premier Bill Davis in several portfolios including Minister of Health and Minister of Natural Resources. He also served five years as the Treasurer of Ontario.

When Davis announced his pending resignation in 1985, Miller vied for the leadership of the party and won over a slate of three other candidates. In February, 1985, he formed a cabinet of 33 ministers which was the largest cabinet in Ontario's history. Miller quickly called an election which was held on May 2. His party lost 18 seats but still held the most seats with 52. He formed a minority government, which lasted less than two months, when the Liberals under David Peterson and the New Democrats led by Bob Rae formed an unofficial coalition and defeated the government on a confidence motion on June 26. Initially Miller stayed on as leader of the opposition, but resigned shortly after.

Upon retirement from provincial politics, Miller moved back to Muskoka where he became chairman of the District of Muskoka. He died in 2000 in Bracebridge, Ontario.

== Background ==
Miller was born in Toronto, the son of Margaret Stuart McKean and Percy Frank Miller. He attended Oakwood Collegiate Institute in Toronto, and then McGill University in Montreal where he received a degree in engineering. He had a successful career as a professional engineer, car dealer and resort operator.

== Politics ==
In 1967, Miller was elected as a member of the Bracebridge town council, serving until 1970. In the 1971 Ontario provincial election, he ran for election to the Legislative Assembly of Ontario in Muskoka as a Progressive Conservative, and was elected. He was re-elected in the 1975, 1977, 1981, and 1985 elections.

He joined the cabinet of Premier William Davis on February 26, 1974 as Minister of Health. He planned to close a number of small hospitals and consolidate urban services after the 1975 election, but withdrew in the face of cabinet opposition. He suffered a heart attack during this period.

Miller became Minister of Natural Resources following a cabinet shuffle on February 3, 1977. On August 16, 1978, he was promoted to Treasurer and Minister of Economics. As Treasurer, he opposed the Davis government's Suncor purchase in 1981 and considered resigning over the issue. After another shuffle on July 6, 1983, he was named Minister of Industry and Trade. In 1983, he gained notoriety for wearing a loud tartan jacket to the 1983 budget ceremony. He was caricatured by some reporters as a symbol of Ontario's rural past, and seemed out of step with generational and demographic changes in the province. Senior party organizer Hugh Segal later acknowledged that the jacket probably alienated many new voters.

=== Party leadership and Premier ===
When Davis retired, Miller defeated Larry Grossman, Roy McMurtry and Dennis Timbrell for the leadership of the Progressive Conservative party in its January 1985 leadership convention.

Davis and his predecessor John Robarts were considered Red Tories and ran relatively progressive administrations that increased public investment and expanded the public sector.

Under their watch, the Ontario Tories were often seen to be running left of the Liberals. Miller, on the other hand, was more typical of the party's base of social conservatives from Ontario's rural areas. When Davis officially stepped down on February 8, 1985, Miller became Premier. Miller's victory created some divisions in the Progressive Conservative Party, and he had difficulty keeping order among senior party staff.

In February, 1985, Miller announced his first cabinet with a record 33 members including 7 Ministers without portfolio. The size of the cabinet belied Miller's rhetoric of a lean, efficient government. David Peterson called it the "fattest, most bloated Cabinet in the history of this province".

=== 1985 election ===
Miller's Progressive Conservatives had a significant lead in the polls of around 55% (compared to the two opposition parties, in the low to mid 20s) when he called an election for May 1985, but his campaign was considered disastrous. He elicited controversy when he refused to agree to a television debate with Liberal leader David Peterson and New Democratic Party leader Bob Rae. This decision is thought to have hurt Miller's standing with the public. His situation was also made more difficult by Davis's decision to extend public funding for Catholic Separate Schools to grade 13, a decision that had been left to Miller to implement. Although the policy was supported by all parties in the legislature, it was unpopular with some in the Tories' traditional rural Protestant base. Many PC voters were so upset that they simply stayed home on election day because of this issue.

In the election, the Liberals won a narrow plurality of the popular vote. However, at the time rural areas were still overrepresented in the Legislative Assembly, enabling Miller to win reelection. However, the Tories were cut down to a minority government, in which the Tories had only four more seats than the Liberals and were 11 seats short of a majority. The NDP, with 25 seats, held the balance of power.

=== Minority government and defeat ===
After several weeks of negotiations with both parties, the NDP signed an agreement with Peterson to support a Liberal minority government. As per this agreement, Rae introduced a Motion of No Confidence in the Miller government, which carried. As a result of the Liberal-NDP accord, Lieutenant-Governor John Black Aird asked Peterson to form a government. Miller formally resigned as Premier on June 26, 1985; ending 42 years of Progressive Conservative rule over Ontario.

Miller resigned as Progressive Conservative leader soon afterward. He was replaced by Larry Grossman in a November 1985 leadership convention. Miller formally resigned as party leader and Leader of the Opposition in early 1986. He played only a minor role in the legislature after this time, and did not seek re-election in 1987.

=== Cabinet positions ===
Davis ministry, Province of Ontario (1971–1985)
Cabinet posts (4)
Predecessor	Office	Successor
Gordon Walker	Minister of Industry and Trade; 1983–1985	Andy Brandt
Darcy McKeough	Treasurer and Minister of Economics; 1978–1983	Larry Grossman
Leo Bernier	Minister of Natural Resources; 1977–1978	James Auld
Richard Potter	Minister of Health; 1974–1977	Dennis Timbrell

== Later life ==
After leaving the legislature, Miller later became chairman of the District of Muskoka.

The Tories did not return to power in Ontario until the 1995 election, when Mike Harris, who Miller had brought to his cabinet as Minister of Natural Resources, became premier.

Miller returned to private life, dying in 2000. His son, Norm Miller, entered provincial politics in 2001, winning a by-election in the riding of Parry Sound—Muskoka after Ernie Eves resigned the seat.
