= Parry Sound =

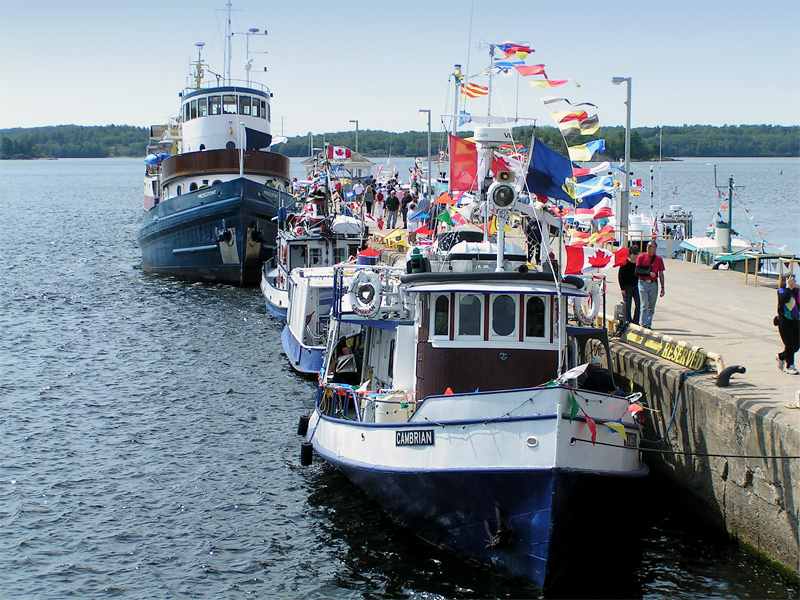
- Harbour of the town of Parry Sound

- Location in southern Ontario
- Coordinates: 45°21′31″N 80°07′12″W
- Type: Sound
- Part of: Great Lakes Basin
- Primary inflows: Seguin River
- Primary outflows: to Georgian Bay
- Basin countries: Canada
- Surface elevation: 176 metres (577 ft)

Parry Sound is a sound or bay of Georgian Bay on Lake Huron, in Ontario, Canada. It is highly irregularly shaped with many deep bays and islands. Killbear Provincial Park is located on the large peninsula that separates the sound from Georgian Bay, while it is bordered on the south side by Parry Island, home of the Wasauksing First Nation, Wasauksing being the First Nation's name for the bay. At the head of the sound is the namesake town that is the largest community on the shores of Georgian Bay from Severn Sound to Manitoulin Island.

The following entities are named after this geographic feature:

- Parry Sound District
  - Parry Sound, town and seat of Parry Sound District
  - Parry Sound, Unorganized, Centre Part, Ontario
  - Parry Sound, Unorganized, North East Part, Ontario
- Electoral districts
  - Parry Sound (federal electoral district), the federal electoral district from 1904 to 1949
  - Parry Sound-Muskoka, the current federal electoral district
  - Parry Sound—Muskoka (provincial electoral district), the current provincial electoral district
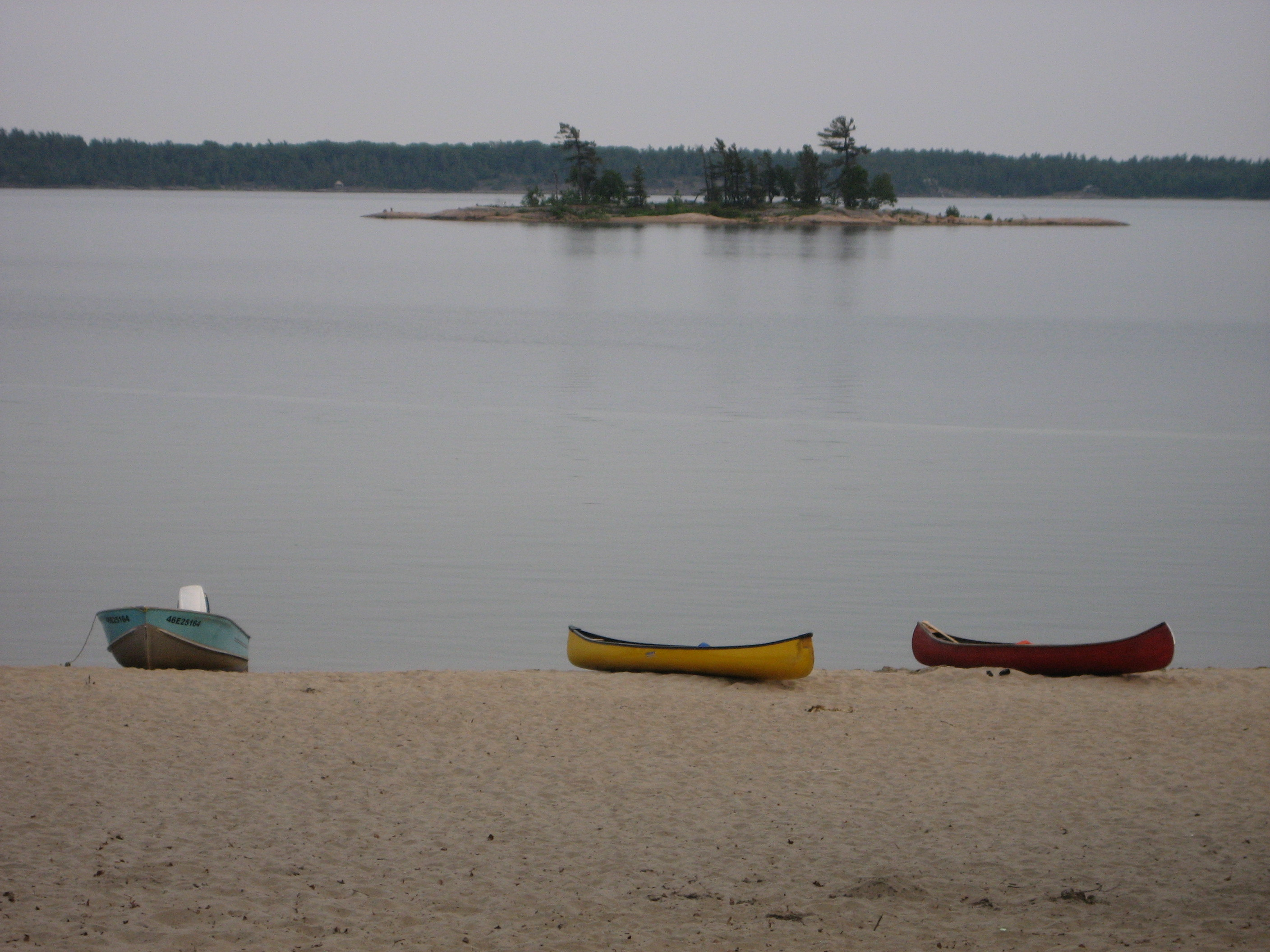
View from Killbear Provincial Park

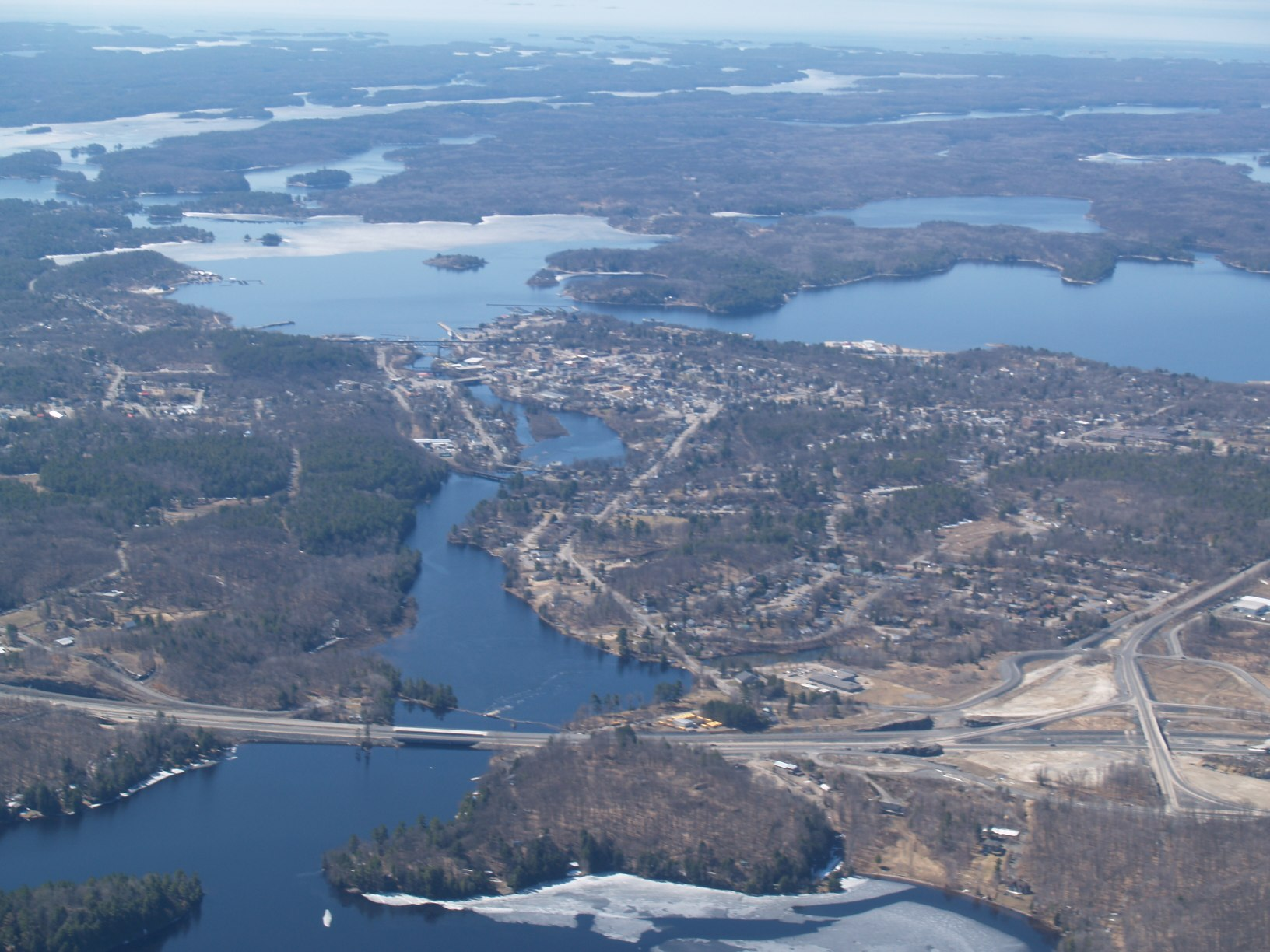
Aerial View of Parry Sound in 2010
