= Parry Sound—Muskoka (provincial electoral district) =

Provincial electoral district in Ontario, Canada

Coordinates: 45.529°N 79.772°W

Ontario electoral district
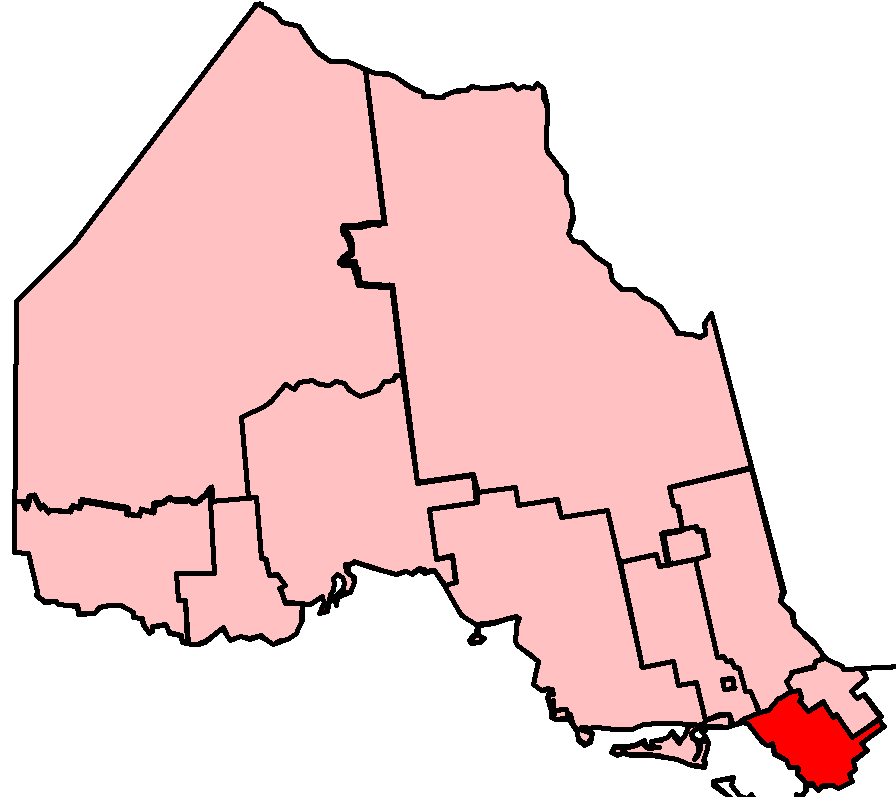
- Parry Sound—Muskoka in relation to other Northern Ontario ridings

Provincial electoral district
- Legislature: Legislative Assembly of Ontario
MPP
Graydon Smith
Progressive Conservative
- District created: 1999
- First contested: 1999
- Last contested: 2025

Demographics
- Population (2016): 94,400
- Electors (2018): 80,180
- Area (km²): 19,275
- Pop. density (per km²): 4.9
- Census division(s): Parry Sound District, Muskoka District, Nipissing District
- Census subdivision(s): Huntsville, Bracebridge, Gravenhurst, Muskoka Lakes, Parry Sound, Seguin, Lake of Bays, McDougall, Georgian Bay, Perry

Parry Sound—Muskoka is a provincial electoral district in Ontario, Canada. The riding was once held by Ontario Premier Ernie Eves, and, by Norm Miller, son of former Premier Frank Miller.

The district, which has existed since 1999, has identical boundaries to those of the federal district of Parry Sound-Muskoka.

The riding consists of the Territorial District of Parry Sound (excluding the town of Powassan, the townships of Nipissing and North Himsworth, and the part of the town of Killarney contained in the district), the District Municipality of Muskoka, and the part of the town of Kearney lying in the Territorial Nipissing District.

== History ==
Prior to the 1999 boundary realignment two ridings covered the area: Parry Sound and Muskoka. Parry Sound—Muskoka provincial electoral district was created in 1906, Ontario was divided into the same electoral districts as those used for federal electoral purposes. They were redistributed whenever a readjustment took place at the federal level.

It initially consisted of the District Municipality of Muskoka, the Territorial District of Parry Sound (excluding the towns of Powassan and Trout Creek and the townships of Nipissing, North Himsworth and South Himsworth) and the township of Sherborne and Others (formerly Sherborne, McClintock, Livingstone, Lawrence and Nightingale) in the county of Haliburton.

In 2005, legislation was passed by the Legislature to divide Ontario into 107 electoral districts, beginning with the next provincial election in 2007. The eleven northern electoral districts are those defined for federal purposes in 1996, based on the 1991 census (except for a minor boundary adjustment). The 96 southern electoral districts are those defined for federal electoral purposes in 2003, based on the 2001 census. Without this legislation, the number of electoral districts in northern Ontario would have been reduced from eleven to ten.

While the riding is a stronghold of the Progressive Conservatives, it has also been friendly to the Greens, scoring only a little more than 2,000 votes less than the PCs in the 2022 election. The Greens generally do best in the larger towns like Huntsville, Bracebridge, Gravenhurst, and Parry Sound. The PCs do best in more rural areas, especially those in the north of the riding. They do worst in reservations, which are also where the NDP does best.

== Members of Provincial Parliament ==
Parry Sound—Muskoka
Assembly	Years	Member	Party
Riding created from Parry Sound and Muskoka
37th	1999–2001	Ernie Eves	Progressive Conservative
37th	2001–2003	Norm Miller	Progressive Conservative
38th	2003–2007	Norm Miller	Progressive Conservative
39th	2007–2011	Norm Miller	Progressive Conservative
40th	2011–2014	Norm Miller	Progressive Conservative
41st	2014–2018	Norm Miller	Progressive Conservative
42nd	2018–2022	Norm Miller	Progressive Conservative
43rd	2022–2025	Graydon Smith	Progressive Conservative
44th	2025–present	Graydon Smith	Progressive Conservative

== Election results ==
2025 Ontario general election
Party	Candidate	Votes	%	±%
Progressive Conservative	Graydon Smith	21,731	46.80	+1.43
Green	Matt Richter	19,360	41.69	+1.07
Liberal	David Innes	2,828	6.09	–
New Democratic	Jim Ronholm	1,329	2.86	–4.83
New Blue	Brandon Nicksy	785	1.69	–0.29
Ontario Party	Helen Kroeker	403	0.87	–2.83
Total valid votes		46,436	99.21	
Total rejected, unmarked and declined ballots		371	0.79	+0.37
Turnout		46,807	53.71	+0.62
Eligible voters		87,147		
Progressive Conservative hold		Swing		+0.18
Source: Elections Ontario

2022 Ontario general election
Party	Candidate	Votes	%	±%	Expenditures
Progressive Conservative	Graydon Smith	20,216	45.37	–2.70	$85,536
Green	Matt Richter	18,102	40.63	+20.61	$95,858
New Democratic	Erin Horvath	3,427	7.69	–14.34	$14,568
Ontario Party	Andrew John Cocks	1,649	3.70	–	$8,029
New Blue	Doug Maynard	883	1.98	–	$2,616
Independent	Daniel Predie Jr.	155	0.35	–	$0
Populist	Brad Waddell	126	0.28	–	$3,142
Total valid votes/expense limit		44,558	99.58	–	$117,992
Total rejected, unmarked and declined ballots		187	0.42	–0.29	
Turnout		44,745	53.09	–6.12	
Eligible voters		84,280			
Progressive Conservative hold		Swing		–11.65	
Source: Elections Ontario

2018 Ontario general election
Party	Candidate	Votes	%	±%	Expenditures
Progressive Conservative	Norm Miller	22,662	48.07	+7.34	$49,423
New Democratic	Erin Horvath	10,385	22.03	+9.11	$5,354
Green	Matt Richter	9,438	20.02	+0.68	$24,017
Liberal	Brenda Rhodes	4,071	8.64	–17.61	$13,501
Independent	Jeff Mole	219	0.46	–	none listed
Libertarian	Chris Packer	196	0.42	–	none listed
None of the Above	Joshua Macdonald	172	0.36	–	$0
Total valid votes		47,143	99.29		
Total rejected, unmarked and declined ballots		336	0.71	–0.48	
Turnout		47,479	59.22	+7.10	
Eligible voters		80,180			
Progressive Conservative hold		Swing		–0.88	
Source: Elections Ontario

2014 Ontario general election
Party	Candidate	Votes	%	±%
Progressive Conservative	Norm Miller	15,761	40.73	–13.36
Liberal	Dan Waters	10,158	26.25	+8.04
Green	Matt Richter	7,484	19.34	+10.28
New Democratic	Clyde Mobbley	4,999	12.92	–5.26
Freedom	Andy Stivrins	296	0.76	+0.30
Total valid votes		38,698	98.81	
Total rejected, unmarked and declined ballots		467	1.19	+0.72
Turnout		39,165	52.11	+0.33
Eligible voters		75,153		
Progressive Conservative hold		Swing		–10.70
Source: Elections Ontario

2011 Ontario general election
Party	Candidate	Votes	%	±%
Progressive Conservative	Norm Miller	19,417	54.09	+6.87
Liberal	Cindy Waters	6,537	18.21	–8.52
New Democratic	Alex Zyganiuk	6,527	18.18	+4.53
Green	Matt Richter	3,251	9.06	–3.35
Freedom	Andy Stivrins	167	0.47	–
Total valid votes		35,899	99.53	
Total rejected, unmarked and declined ballots		171	0.47	+0.13
Turnout		36,070	51.79	–4.97
Eligible voters		69,651		
Progressive Conservative hold		Swing		+7.69
Source: Elections Ontario

2007 Ontario general election
Party	Candidate	Votes	%	±%
Progressive Conservative	Norm Miller	17,348	47.22	–1.29
Liberal	Brenda Rhodes	9,819	26.73	–7.72
New Democratic	Sara Hall	5,015	13.65	+3.73
Green	Matt Richter	4,557	12.40	+6.52
Total valid votes		36,739	99.66	
Total rejected, unmarked and declined ballots		127	0.34	–0.01
Turnout		36,866	56.76	–3.27
Eligible voters		64,951		
Progressive Conservative hold		Swing		+3.21
Source: Elections Ontario

2003 Ontario general election
Party	Candidate	Votes	%	±%	Expenditures
Progressive Conservative	Norm Miller	18,776	48.51	–0.79	$49,869
Liberal	Dan Waters	13,332	34.44	+0.14	$42,984
New Democratic	Jo-Anne Marie Boulding	3,838	9.92	+6.52	$8,378
Green	Glen Hodgson	2,277	5.88	–6.45	$3,385
Family Coalition	Charlene Phinney	484	1.25	–	$909
Total valid votes		38,707	99.64		
Total rejected, unmarked and declined ballots		138	0.36	–0.00	
Turnout		38,845	60.03	+19.21	
Eligible voters		64,710			
Progressive Conservative hold		Swing		–0.46	
Source: Elections Ontario

Ontario provincial by-election, February 8, 2001 Resignation of Ernie Eves
Party	Candidate	Votes	%	±%
Progressive Conservative	Norm Miller	12,903	49.30	–8.67
Liberal	Evelyn Brown	8,979	34.31	+6.62
Green	Richard Thomas	3,229	12.34	–
New Democratic	Joanne R. Bury	888	3.39	–10.09
Independent	Anne Marsden	113	0.43	–
Independent	John Turmel	61	0.23	–
Total valid votes		26,173	99.64	
Total rejected, unmarked and declined ballots		94	0.36	–0.15
Turnout		26,267	40.82	–20.28
Eligible voters		64,347		
Progressive Conservative hold		Swing		–7.64
Source: Elections Ontario

1999 Ontario general election
Party	Candidate	Votes	%
Progressive Conservative	Ernie Eves	22,967	57.97
Liberal	Isabel Doxey	10,970	27.69
New Democratic	Dan Waters	5,343	13.49
Natural Law	Iris Tamssot	339	0.86
Total valid votes		39,619	99.49
Total rejected, unmarked and declined ballots		203	0.51
Turnout		39,822	61.10
Eligible voters		65,171	
Progressive Conservative pickup new district.			
Source: Elections Ontario

== 2007 electoral reform referendum ==
2007 Ontario electoral reform referendum
Side	Votes	%
First Past the Post	24,430	67.9
Mixed member proportional	11,523	32.1
Total valid votes	35,953	100.0

== See also ==
- List of Ontario provincial electoral districts
- Canadian provincial electoral districts

== Sources ==
- Elections Ontario
  - 1999 results
  - 2003 results
  - 2007 results
- Map of riding for 2018 election
