= 2023 Ontario Liberal Party leadership endorsements =

Canadian province party leadership election

2023 Ontario Liberal Party leadership election
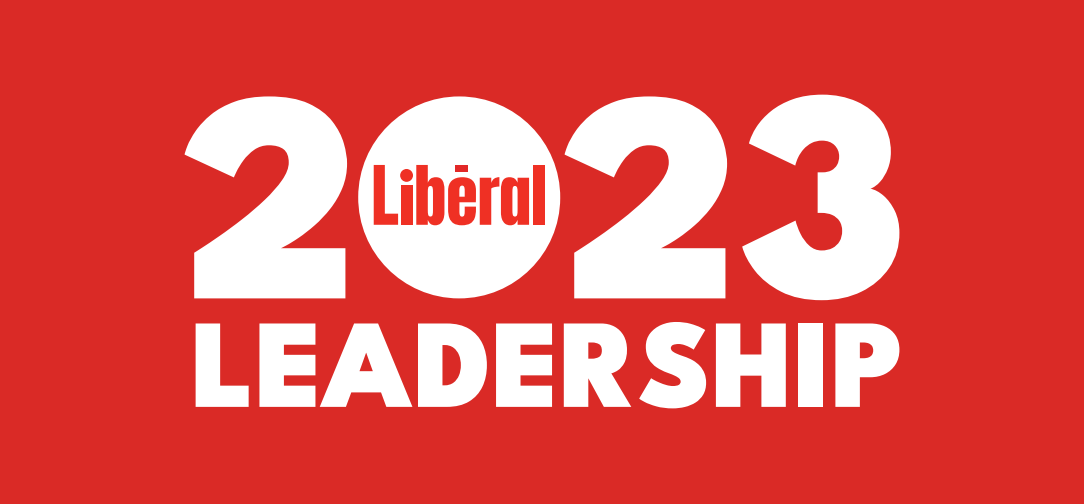
- Date: December 2, 2023
- Resigning leader: Steven Del Duca
- Won by: Bonnie Crombie
- Ballots: 3
- Candidates: 4
- Entrance fee: $100,000 (plus $25,000 refundable deposit)
- Spending limit: $900,000

Endorsements by current and former officeholders were prominently featured and extensively leveraged by contestants during the 2023 Ontario Liberal Party leadership contest. This is a list of such elected officeholders who provided endorsements to candidates or had their expression of support reported in the media.

== Caucus endorsements ==
As typical in leadership contests of the two main political parties in Canada and other countries with government based on the Westminster model, the public support of incumbent caucus members were the endorsements most prized by the contestants and most often cited by journalists and pundits.

The Ontario Liberals only expand their caucus by one seat at the end of the 2022 Ontario election to a total of eight. Its rank was briefly reduced to seven due to a resignation, but expanded to nine late July that year following two byelections. Of the seven caucus members that were in office when the contest started in earnest in early summer, two were contestants (Ted Hsu & Adil Shamji), two declared neutrality (John Fraser as interim leader, and Stephen Blais as co-chair of the contest debates and result event), leaving only three potential caucus endorsements up for grab.

The three contestants who were not sitting MPPs each laid claims to one of the three MPPs as they launched their campaigns in late May to early June: Erskine-Smith was backed by his local MPP Mary-Margaret McMahon, Naqvi had his neighboring MPP Lucille Collard as a campaign co-chair, and Crombie's campaign launch was headlined by Stephanie Bowman. The Liberals welcomed two new MPPs in July following by-elections intensely contested by the governing Conservatives. Erskine-Smith was boosted in late August by the endorsement of Karen McCrimmon, the former Kanata MP who retired in 2021 but re-entered the fray and wrestled the provincial seat from the Conservatives. Crombie seconded her second caucus endorsement in late September when Adil Shamji ended his own bid and joined her campaign (though he did not bring with him his three endorsers). Andrea Hazel, the new MPP for Scarborough who defeated a star candidate handpicked by the Conservative premier, announced her support for Naqvi in late October, as the contest entered its final month.

=== Endorsements tallies ===
	MPPs		MPs	
	Current	Former	Current	Former
Total available	9	~160	78	~240
Bonnie Crombie	2	23	15	5
Nathaniel Erskine-Smith	2	2	5 (Note: 11 MPs representing electoral district outside of Ontario excluded)	6 (Note: 1 former MPs represented electoral district outside of Ontario excluded)
Ted Hsu	1 (self)	3	1	3 (Note: 1 former MPs who is not a Liberal party member excluded)
Yasir Naqvi	2	20	9	7

=== Diminished significance of endorsements ===
With so few caucus endorsements up for grab, the endorsements of Ontario MPs and former MPPs were again seen as indicators of strength and momentum. However, with the party foregoing the convention as the final step of the contest, the significance of such endorsements demonstrably diminished compared to the two previous contests in the preceding decades in two main ways. Firstly, MPs and former MPPs no longer have an formalized outsized votes through entitlement as automatic ex officio delegates. Secondly, their ability to influence subsequent ballot choices was also severely reduced, as there was no longer a period of reflection and intense support jockeying after the first ballot. While certain local results were clearly attributable to specific impactful endorsements, unlike the two previous contests, the general distribution of such high-profile endorsements were not reflected in first ballot results in any meaningful way. While Naqvi was frontrunner Crombie's main rival on the competitions for such endorsements, Erskine-Smith beat him by four percentage point on first ballot and gave Crombie a serious run on final ballot.

=== Regional distribution ===
While the Ontario Liberal Party abandoned the usage of delegated convention, it retained the fundamental premise of equal weighting of input among all electoral districts regardless of membership size or number of votes cast. Endorsement of individuals represented or had significant influence in regions the Liberals has not fared well in recent years (and thus had relatively small Liberal Party membership roll) were therefore seen as particularly valuable. The three main campaign all made concerted efforts in securing and highlighting such endorsements.

=== Endorsement lists ===
Endorsements are grouped together by contestant. The list under each constestant could be sorted by types of endorser, by geographical regions, by names, or by the constituencies the endorsers represented. Endorsements were assigned to one of the following five regions basing on the region endorser represented or hailed from. The regional assignment are informal and included for ease of review. The "weight" of the region, calculated by number of electoral districts are also included for reference:

- North ~10%
- East ~15%
- Cen (Central) ~35%
- Tor. (Toronto) ~20%
- SW (Southwest) ~20%

Titles or offices held listed are current as of the December 2, 2023 when the leadership contest results were announced. This list only includes individuals who held public elected offices, or individuals/entities of prominence sufficient for their expression of support to be reported by news media.

== Bonnie Crombie ==
Type	Reg	Endorser	Constituency represented	Other roles held, notes	Ref
MPPs
MPP	Tor.	Stephanie Bowman	Don Valley West 2022–present		
MPP	Tor.	Adil Shamji	Don Valley East 2022–present		
Former MPPs (Plus: Baker listed under MPs)
ExMPP	North	Rick Bartolucci	Sudbury 1995–2014	Cabinet minister 2003–13	
ExMPP	Tor.	Donna Cansfield	Etobicoke Centre 2003–2014	Cabinet minister 2005–10	
ExMPP	Tor.	Elinor Caplan	Oriole 1985–97	Cabinet minister 1985–86, 87–90	
ExMP	Cen	Elinor Caplan	Thornhill 1997–2004	federal minister 1999–2003	
ExMPP	East	Bob Chiarelli	Ottawa West—Nepean 1987–97, 2010–18	Cabinet minister 2010–18	
ExMPP	Tor.	Alvin Curling	Scarborough—Rouge River 1985–2005	Cabinet minister 1985–89; Speaker 2003–05	
ExMPP	Cen	Dipika Damerla	Mississauga East—Cooksville 2011–18	Cabinet minister 2014–18	
City	Cen	Dipika Damerla	Mississauga city councillor (Ward 7 Cooksville) 2018–present		
ExMPP	Tor.	Brad Duguid	Scarborough Centre 2003–18	Cabinet minister 2007–18	
ExMPP	SW	Caroline Di Cocco	Sarnia—Lambton 1999–2007	Cabinet minister 2006–07	
ExMPP	SW	Dwight Duncan	Windsor—Tecumseh 1995–2013	Cabinet minister 2003–13; Deputy Premier 2011–13	
exCity	SW	Dwight Duncan	Windsor City Councillor 1988–94		
ExMPP	Cen	Ann Hoggarth	Barrie 2014-2018		
ExMPP	Tor.	Linda LeBourdais	Etobicoke West 1987-1990		
ExMPP	Tor.	Cristina Martins	Davenport 2014-2018	Cabinet minister 2006–07	
ExMPP	North	Lyn McLeod	Thunder Bay—Atikokan 1987–2003	OLP leader 1992–1996; Cabinet minister 1987-1990	
ExMPP	East	Madeleine Meilleur	Ottawa—Vanier 2003–2016	Cabinet minister 2003–16	
ExMPP	Tor.	Peter Milczyn	Etobicoke—Lakeshore 2014–18	Cabinet minister 2017–18	
ExMPP	Cen	Reza Moridi	Richmond Hill 2007–18	Cabinet minister 2013–18	
ExMPP	Tor.	Tim Murphy	St. George—St. David 1993–95	Chief of Staff to the Prime Minister 2003–06	
ExMPP	Cen	Steven Offer	Mississauga North 1985–95	Cabinet minister 1989–90	
ExMPP	SW	Steve Peters	Elgin—Middlesex—London 1999–2011	Cabinet minister 2003–07; Speaker 2007–11	
ExMPP	Tor.	Gerry Phillips	Scarborough—Agincourt 1987–2011	Cabinet minister 1987–90, 2003-11	
ExMPP	East	Amanda Simard	Glengarry—Prescott—Russell 2018–22		
ExMPP	Cen	Chris Ward	Wentworth North 1985–90	Cabinet minister 1987–90	
ExMPP	Tor.	Soo Wong	Scarborough—Agincourt 2011–18		
ExMPP	SW	Bill Wrye	Windsor—Sandwich 1981–90	Cabinet minister 1985–90	
MPs
MP	East	Chandra Arya	Nepean 2015–present		
MP	Cen	Vance Badawey	Niagara Centre 2015–present		
MP	Tor.	Yvan Baker	Etobicoke Centre 2019–present		
exMPP	Tor.	Yvan Baker	Etobicoke Centre 2014-18		
MP	Cen	Chris Bittle	St. Catharines 2015–present		
MP	Cen	Chad Collins	Hamilton East—Stoney Creek 2021–present		
MP	East	Francis Drouin	Glengarry—Prescott—Russell 2015–present		
MP	Tor.	Ali Ehsassi	Willowdale 2015–present		
MP	Cen	Iqra Khalid	Mississauga—Erin Mills 2015–present		
MP	Tor.	James Maloney	Etobicoke-Lakeshore 2015–present		
MP	Tor.	Marco Mendicino	Eglinton-Lawrence 2015–present	federal minister 2019–23	
MP	Cen	Leah Taylor Roy	Aurora—Oak Ridges—Richmond Hill 2021–present		
MP	North	Marc Serré	Nickel Belt 2015–present		
MP	Tor.	Judy Sgro	Humber River—Black Creek 1997–present	federal minister 2003–05	
exCity	Tor.	Judy Sgro	North York/Toronto Councillor 1987–99		
MP	Cen	Francesco Sorbara	Vaughan—Woodbridge 2015–present		
MP	Cen	Rechie Valdez	Mississauga—Streetsville 2021–present		
Former federal parliamentarians (Plus: Caplan listed under former MPP)
ExMP	Cen	Gurbax S. Malhi	Bramalea—Gore—Malton 1997-2011		
ExMP	Cen	John McCallum	Markham 2000-17	Cabinet minister 2002-06, 2015-17, Canadian Ambassador to China 2017-19	
ExMP	Tor.	Maria Minna	Beaches—East York 1993-2011	federal minister 1999–2002	
ExMP	Cen	Kyle Peterson	Newmarket—Aurora 2015–2019		
ExMP	East	Kim Rudd	Northumberland—Peterborough South 2015–2019		
Municipal elected officials (Plus: Damerla listed under former MPPs)
City	East	Donna Blackburn	Ottawa-Carleton District School Board Trustee since 2010		
City	Cen	Sammy Ijaz	Milton Town councillor & regional councillor for Ward 3 2022–present		
City	North	Natalie Labbee	Greater Sudbury Councillor 2022–present		
City	Cen	Jeff Lehman	Chair of the District of Muskoka 2022–present	Mayor of Barrie 2010-22	
City	Cen	Jill Promoli	School Trustee in Mississauga 2022–present		
City	North	Roger Sigouin	Mayor of Hearst since 2002		
City	Cen	Alvin Tedjo	Mississauga City Councillor 2022–present	2020 OLP leadership contestant	
City	East	Tim Tierney	Ottawa City Councillor		
Former municipal elected officials
exCity	North	Marianne Matichuk	Mayor of Greater Sudbury 2010-2014		
Other notable endorsements
Misc	Tor.	The Toronto Star			
References for endorsements of Bonnie Crombie

== Nathaniel Erskine-Smith ==
Type	Reg	Endorser	Constituency represented	Other roles held, notes	Ref
MPPs
MPP	East	Karen McCrimmon	Kanata—Carleton 2023–present		
ExMP	East	Karen McCrimmon	Kanata—Carleton 2015-21		
MPP	Tor.	Mary-Margaret McMahon	Beaches—East York since 2022		
ExCity	Tor.	Mary-Margaret McMahon	Toronto City Councillor for Ward 32; Beaches-East York 2010-18		
Former MPPs
ExMPP	Tor.	Dianne Poole	Eglinton 1987-1995		
ExMPP	Tor.	Arthur Potts	Beaches—East York 2014-2018		
MPs
MP	Cen	Pam Damoff	Oakville North—Burlington 2015–present		
MP	Tor	Julie Dabrusin	Toronto—Danforth 2015–present		
MP	SW	Peter Fragiskatos	London North Centre 2015–present		
MP	North	Viviane Lapointe	Sudbury 2021–present		
MP	North	Marcus Powlowski	Thunder Bay—Rainy River 2019–present		
MP	(n/a)	Jenica Atwin	Fredericton (New Brunswick) 2019–present		
MP	(n/a)	Emmanuel Dubourg	Bourassa (QC) 2014–present		
MP	(n/a)	Fayçal El-Khoury	Laval—Les Îles (QC) 2015–present		
MP	(n/a)	Anthony Housefather	Mount Royal (QC) 2015–present		
MP	(n/a)	Emmanuella Lambropoulos	Saint-Laurent (QC) 2017–present		
MP	(n/a)	Wayne Long	Saint John—Rothesay (NB) 2015–present		
MP	(n/a)	Heath MacDonald	Malpeque (PEI) 2021–present		
MP	(n/a)	Alexandra Mendès	Brossard—Saint-Lambert (QC) 2015–present		bgcolor=#CCC
MP	(n/a)	Sherry Romanado	Longueuil—Charles-LeMoyne (QC) 2015–present		
MP	(n/a)	Peter Schiefke	Vaudreuil—Soulanges (QC) 2015–present		
MP	(n/a)	Patrick Weiler	West Vancouver—Sunshine Coast—Sea to Sky Country (BC) 2019–present		
Former federal parliamentarians (Plus: McCrimmon listed under current MPPs)
ExMP	East	Neil Ellis	Bay of Quinte 2015–21		
City	East	Neil Ellis	Mayor of Belleville 2006–14 & 2022–present		
ExMP	East	Catherine McKenna	Ottawa Centre 2015-2021	Cabinet minister 2015-21	
ExMP	Tor.	Lorna Marsden	(Ontario Senator 1984–92		
ExMP	North	Bob Nault	Kenora—Rainy River 1988-2004, Kenora 2015–19	Cabinet minister 1999-2003	
ExMP	SW	Kate Young	London West 2015–2021		
ExMP	(n/a)	Frank Baylis	Pierrefonds-Dollard (QC) 2015–19		
Municipal elected officials
City	North	Shelby Ch'ng	Thunder Bay City councillor 2014–present		
City	SW	Anne Marie Gillis	Sarnia city councillor 2003-18 & 2022–present		
Former municipal elected officials (McMahon listed under current MPP)
Other prominent individuals
Other	North	Jeff Copenace	elected Chief of Ojibways of Onigaming First Nation		
References for endorsements of Nate Erskine-Smith

== Ted Hsu ==
Type	Reg	Endorser	Constituency represented	Other roles held, notes	Ref
Former MPPs
ExMPP	East	John Gerretsen	Kingston and the Islands 1995–2014	Cabinet minister 2003–2014	
exCity	East	John Gerretsen	Mayor of Kingston 1980–88		
ExMPP	SW	Carol Mitchell	Huron—Bruce 2003–2011	Cabinet minister 2010–2011	
ExMPP	Cen	Greg Sorbara	York Centre 1985–1995, Vaughan 2001–2012	Cabinet minister 1985–1990, 2003–2005, 2006–2007	
MPs
MPP	East	Mark Gerretsen	Kingston and the Islands 2015–present		
exCity	East	Mark Gerretsen	Mayor of Kingston 2010–14		
Former federal parliamentarians
ExMP	East	Mike Bossio	Hastings—Lennox and Addington 2015-2019		
ExMP	East	Peter Milliken	Kingston and the Islands 1988-2011	Speaker of the House 2001-2011	
ExMP	SW	Frank Valeriote	Guelph 2008-2015		
ExMP	North	Bruce Hyer	Thunder Bay-Superior North 2008-15 (NDP/Green MP), Deputy Leader of the Green Party of Canada		
Municipal elected officials
City	East	Jimmy Hassan	Councillor District 6, Kingston City Council		
ExCity	East	Jeff Peters	former Storrington Township Councillor		
Other prominent individuals
Other		Rob Baker	Lead Guitarist for The Tragically Hip		
References for endorsements of Ted Hsu

== Yasir Naqvi ==
Type	Reg	Endorser	Constituency represented	Other roles held, notes	Ref
MPPs
MPP	East	Lucille Collard	Ottawa—Vanier 2020–present		
MPP	Tor.	Andrea Hazell	Scarborough—Guildwood 2023–present		
Former MPPs (Plus: Jaczek , Lalonde under current MP; Boudria under former MPs)
ExMPP	Cen	Charles Beer	York North 1985-95	Cabinet minister 1989-90	
ExMPP	East	Jim Brownell	Stormont—Dundas 2003-11		
ExMPP	East	Sean Conway	Renfrew-Nipissing-Pembroke 1975-2003	cabinet minister 1985-90; deputy party leader 1982-85, 91-96; Dean of the Legislative Assembly 1999-2003	
ExMPP	Cen	Bob Delaney	Mississauga—Streetsville 2003-18		
ExMPP	North	Michael Gravelle	Thunder Bay-Superior North 1995-2022	Cabinet minister 2007-18	
ExMPP	Cen	Linda Jeffrey	Brampton-Springdale 2003-14	Cabinet minister 2010-14	
ExCity	Cen	Linda Jeffrey	Mayor of Brampton 2014-18		
ExMPP	East	Sophie Kiwala	Kingston and the Islands 2014-18		
ExMPP	SW	Dave Levac	Brant 1999-2018	Speaker 2011-18	
ExMPP	SW	Deb Matthews	London North Centre 2003-18	Cabinet minister 2007-18; Deputy Premier 2013-18	
ExMPP	North	Bill Mauro	Thunder Bay—Atikokan 2003-2018	Cabinet minister 2014-2018	
ExCity	North	Bill Mauro	Mayor of Thunder Bay 2018-22		
ExMPP	East	Phil McNeely	Ottawa-Orléans 2003-14,	Ottawa City Councillor 2000-03	
ExMPP	SW	Khalil Ramal	London—Fanshawe 2003-11		
ExMPP	East	Lou Rinaldi	Northumberland-Quinte West 2003-11, 14-18		
ExCity	East	Lou Rinaldi	Mayor (2000-03)	Town councillor (1992–98) and reeve (1998-2000) of Brighton	
ExMPP	North	Monique Smith	Nipissing 2003-2011	Cabinet minister 2007-11	
ExMPP	North	Glenn Thibeault	Sudbury 2015–2018	Cabinet minister 2016-2018	
ExMPP	East	Jim Watson	Ottawa West—Nepean 2003-10	Cabinet minister 2003-10	
ExCity	East	Jim Watson	Mayor, City of Ottawa 1997-2000, 2010–22	councillor for Capital Ward 1991-97	
ExMPP	SW	John Wilkinson	Perth—Wellington 2003–11	Cabinet minister 2007–11	
MPs
MP	Cen	Paul Chiang	Markham-Unionville since 2021		
MP	East	Mona Fortier	Ottawa—Vanier 2017–present	Cabinet minister 2019-23	
MP	Cen	Helena Jaczek	Markham—Stouffville 2019–present	Federal minister 2021-23	
ExMPP	Cen	Helena Jaczek	Markham-Stouffville 2007-18	Cabinet minister (2014-18)	
MP	Cen	Majid Jowhari	Richmond Hill 2015–present		
MP	East	Marie-France Lalonde	Orléans 2019–present		
ExMPP	East	Marie-France Lalonde	Orléans 2014-2019	Cabinet minister 2016-18	
MP	East	Jenna Sudds	Kanata-Carleton 2021–present	Federal Minister of Families, Children, and Social Development	
MP	East	Anita Vandenbeld	Ottawa West—Nepean 2015–present		
MP	Tor.	Arif Virani	Parkdale-High Park 2015–present	Federal Minister of Justice and Attorney General	
MP	Tor.	Salma Zahid	Scarborough Centre 2015–present		
Former federal parliamentarians
ExMP	North	Jean-Jacques Blais	Nipissing 1972–84	Federal minister 1978-79, 80-83	
ExMP	East	Don Boudria	Glengarry—Prescott—Russell 1984-2006	Federal minister 1996-2003	
ExMPP	East	Don Boudria	Prescott and Russell 1981-84		
ExCity	East	Don Boudria	Cumberland councilor 1976-81		
ExMP	East	John Manley	Ottawa South 1988-2004	Federal minister 1993-2003	
ExMP	Tor.	Sergio Marchi	York West 1984-99	Cederal minister 1993-99, Ambassador to the World Trade Organization 1999-2006	
ExMP	East	Marie Charette-Poulin	Senator for Northern Ontario 1995-2015	President, Liberal Party of Canada 2006-08	
ExMP	Tor.	Allan Rock	Etobicoke Centre 1993-2004	Federal minister 1993-2003; Ambassador to the United Nations 2004-06	
ExMP	Tor.	Michelle Simson	Scarborough Southwest 2008-11		
Municipal elected officials
City	Cen	Helga Campbell	Niagara Falls Trustee, District School Board of Niagara 2022-–present		
City	Cen	Wayne Campbell	City of Niagara Falls Councillor 1985-2006 & 2014–present	Trustee, District School Board of Niagara 1980-85	
City	East	Cathy Curry	Ottawa Councillor for Kanata North Ward		
City	Tor.	Malika Ghous	Toronto District School Board Trustee		
City	East	Alicia Higgison	Town of Tecumseh Councillor 2022–present	former Trustee 2018-22 & Board Chair 2020-22, Greater Essex County District School Board	
City	East	Rawlson King	Ottawa Councillor for Rideau-Rockcliffe		
City	Cen	Lisa-Marie Wilson	Barrie (Ward 7-10) Trustee, Simcoe County District School Board		
Former municipal elected officials (Plus: McNeely/Rinaldi/Watson/Jeffrey/Mauro under former MPP, Boudria under former MP)'
ExCity	Tor.	Judi Codd	Toronto School Trustee 1994-2003		
ExCity	East	Bob Monette	Ottawa Deputy Mayor 2014–18, Councillor for Orléans 2006–18		
ExCity	East	Robert Quaiff	Prince Edward County Mayor 2014-2018		
ExCity	Cen	Khalid Usman	Markham City Councillor for Ward 7 1997-2006, 18–22		
Other prominent individuals
Other	East	Jamie Carroll	Liberal Party of Canada National Director, 2006–08		
Other	East	Sheila Gervais	Liberal Party of Canada National Director 1989-93		
Other	SW	Ava Hill	Elected Chief 2013-19, Six Nations of the Grand River		
References for endorsements of Yasir Naqvi

== Adil Shamji ==
(Withdrew September 29, 2023, endorsed Crombie)

Type	Reg	Endorser	Constituency represented	Other roles held, notes	Ref
Former MPPs
ExMPP	Tor.	George Smitherman	Toronto Centre 1999–2010	Deputy Premier & cabinet minister 2003-2010	
ExMPP	Tor.	Murad Velshi	Don Mills 1987-90		
References for endorsements of Adil Shamji
