= Northumberland—Peterborough South =

Northumberland—Peterborough South could refer to:

- Northumberland—Peterborough South (federal electoral district)
- Northumberland—Peterborough South (provincial electoral district)
