= 2023 Ontario Liberal Party leadership election =

Canadian province party leader election

- December 2, 2023
- Turnout: 23%
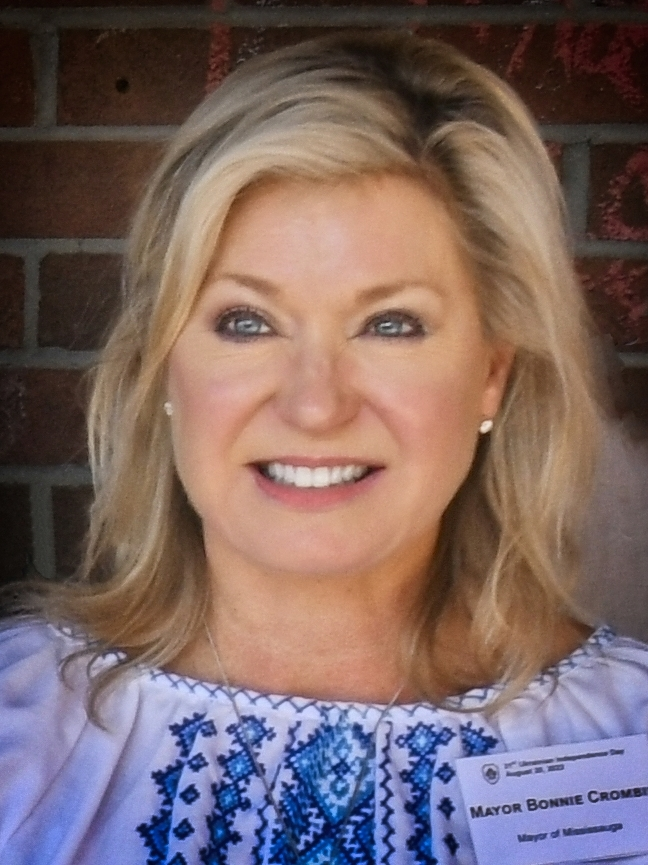

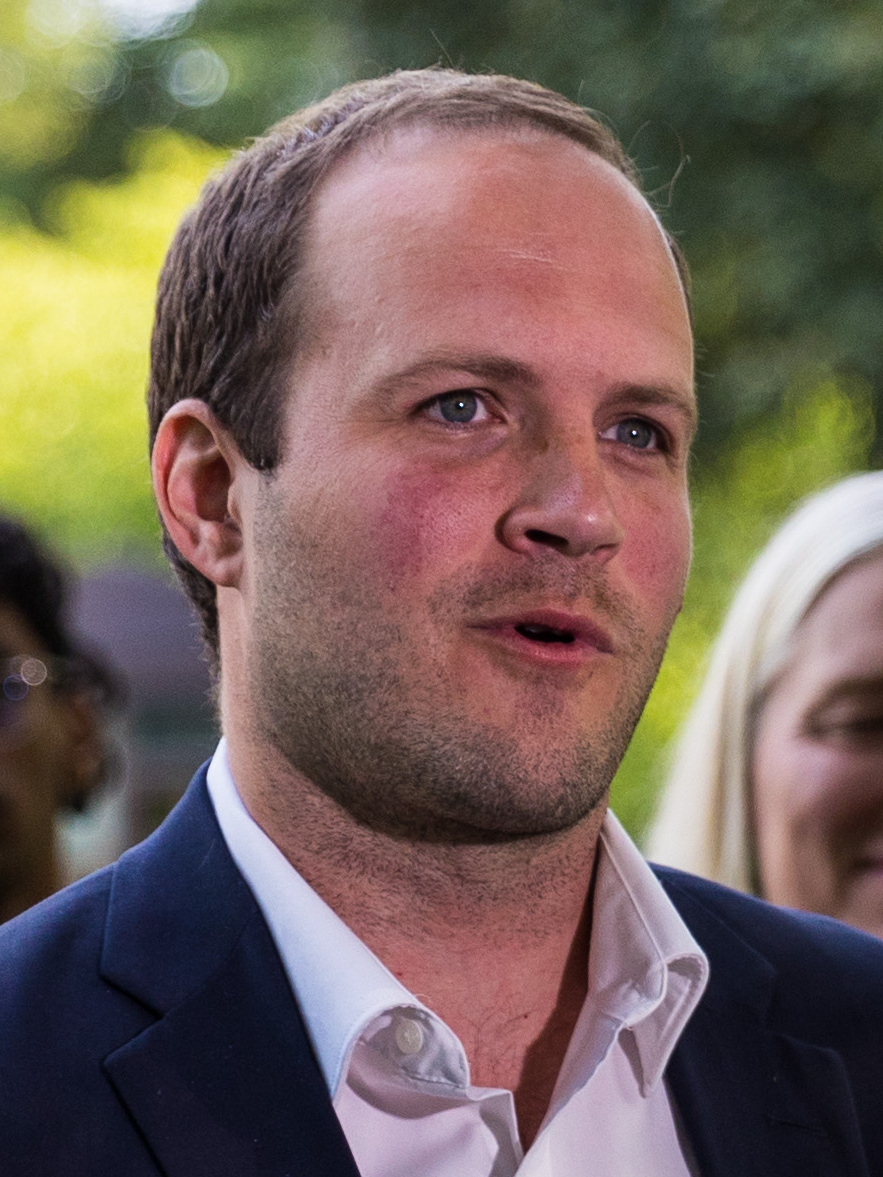

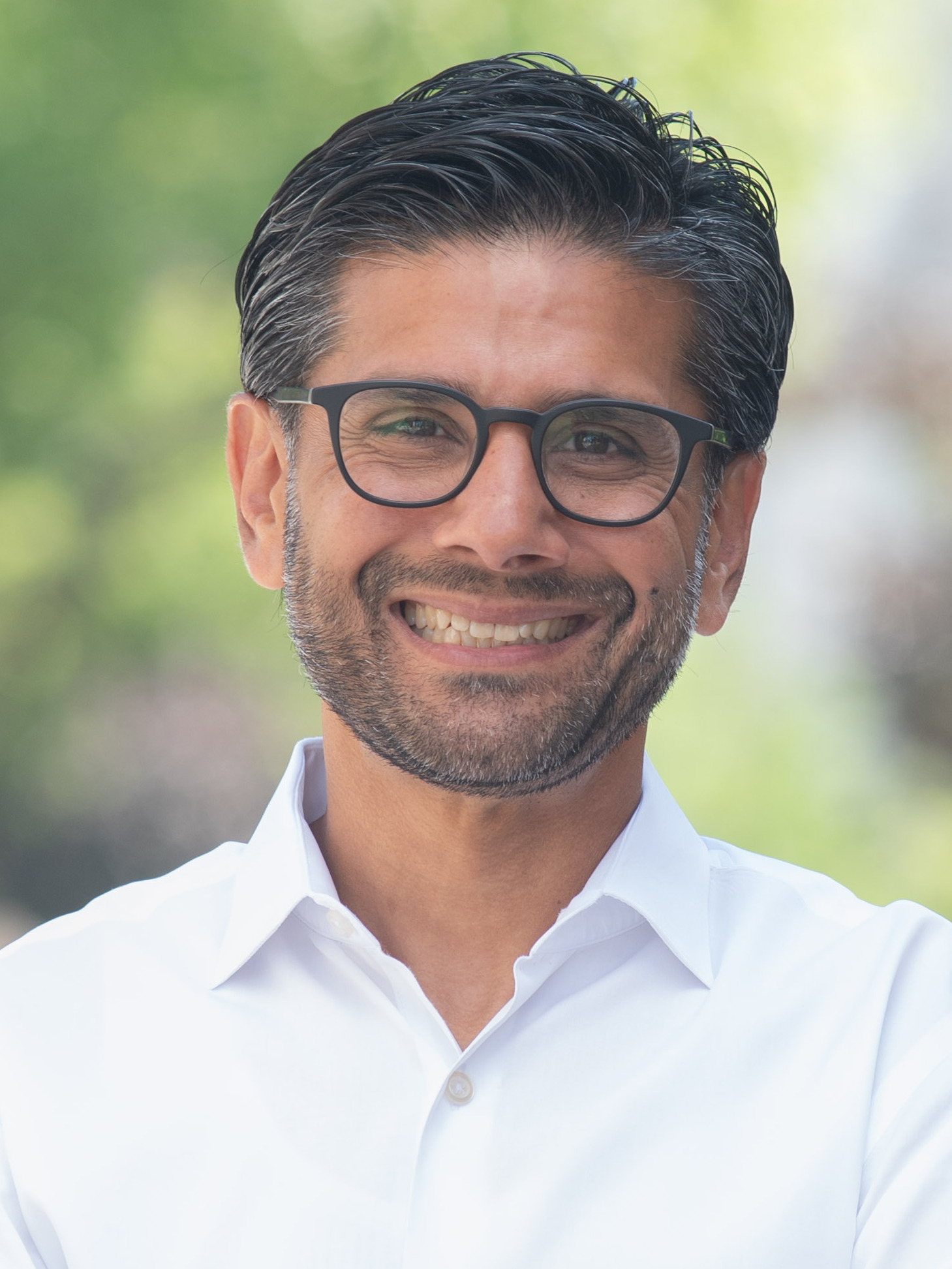

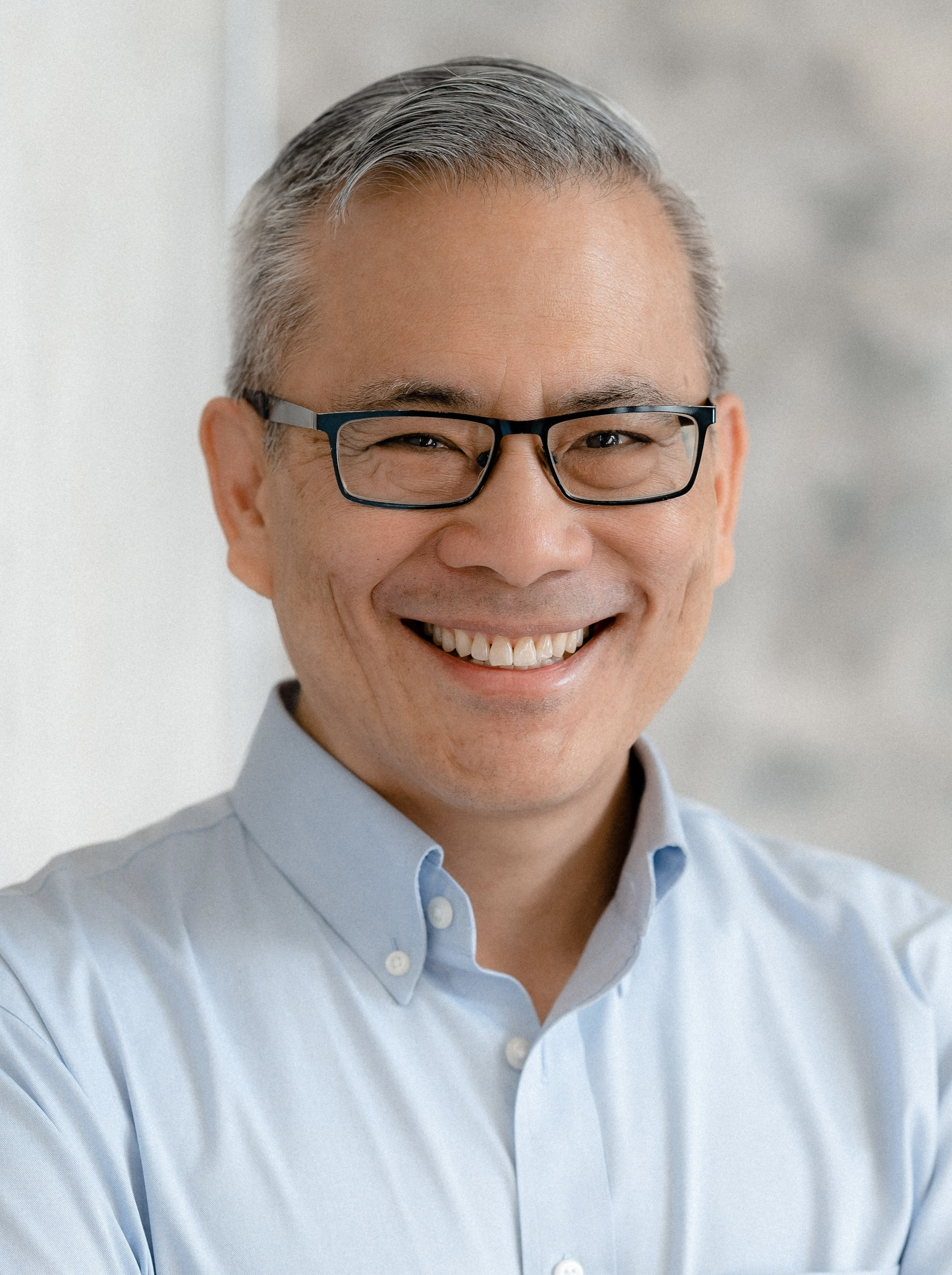
Candidate	Bonnie Crombie	Nathaniel Erskine-Smith
3rd count	6,911 (53.40%)	6,029 (46.59%)
1st count	5,559 (42.96%)	3,320 (25.66%)
Candidate	Yasir Naqvi	Ted Hsu
3rd count	Eliminated	Eliminated
1st count	2,761 (21.33%)	1,300 (10.05%)
Previous Leader
Steven Del Duca (resigned June 2022)
John Fraser (interim)
Elected leader
Bonnie Crombie

The Ontario Liberal Party held a leadership contest in 2023 to elected a new leader to succeed former leader Steven Del Duca, who resigned after the party having failed to win enough seats to secure party status for the second time in a row in the 2022 Ontario general election. The leadership contest, featuring four candidates all having served in the House of Commons but only one with a current seat in the provincial legislature, concluded eighteen months later with balloting held on November 25 and 26, and resulted announced on December 2, 2023. Mississauga Mayor and former Liberal MP Bonnie Crombie was elected on the third ballot/count.

== Background ==
In the 2022 general election, the Ontario Liberal Party saw a modest increase in support over their 2018 result, finishing second in the popular vote. However, the party won only 8 seats, once again falling short of official party status. On the night of the election, Del Duca, who had failed to win back his own riding of Vaughan—Woodbridge, announced his resignation as party leader, stating that a leadership race would be organized to take place "as soon as is reasonable".

2023 Ontario Liberal Party leadership election
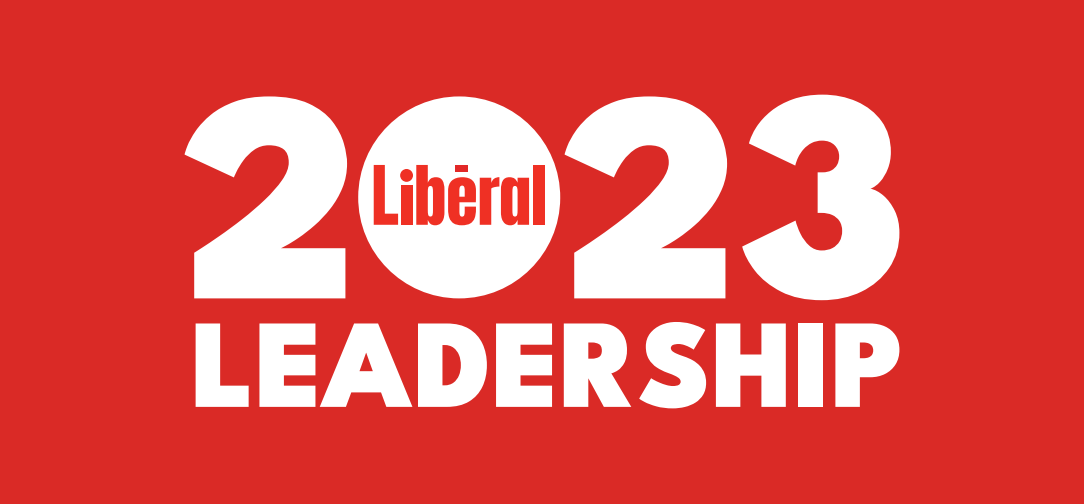
- Date: December 2, 2023 (result announcement)
- Resigning leader: Steven Del Duca
- Won by: Bonnie Crombie
- Ballots: 3
- Candidates: 4
- Entrance fee: $100,000 (plus $25,000 refundable deposit)
- Spending limit: $900,000

On January 5, 2023, the party released a report of their 2022 campaign debrief. One of the main recommendations was for the party to conduct a review of the leadership election process. On January 9, 2023, interim leader John Fraser announced that the party would proceed with consultations looking at whether there should be changes to delegated convention rules.

At it annual meeting held in Hamilton in March 2023, the party voted overwhelmingly to eliminate delegated leadership convention as the final step for leadership election and mandated that the next leader be elected by party members voting directly by ranked ballots. The new voting process and tabulation system retained the key basic premise that all electoral districts being given equal weight in the selection of the leader regardless of the size of their membership or their electoral history. The vote tabulation system adopted is substantially the same as the system used by the federal Liberal and Conservative parties, and the Ontario Progressive Conservative Party.

By voting to eliminate leadership convention, the Ontario Liberal Party made itself the bookends of a chapter of historical significance. Its 1919 leadership convention, held seven weeks before the federal Liberal convention that elected William Lyon Mackenzie King, was the first competitive leadership convention for any Canadian political party with parliamentary representation. Its 2020 leadership convention that elected Del Duca immediately before COVID lock-down was the last leadership convention held by any party of significance in Canada.

== Rules and procedures ==
Under the procedure outlined by the party's constitution and its rules of procedures, all members of the Ontario Liberal Party were eligible to vote directly for leader by preferential ballot and instant-runoff voting as long as they were members in good standing as of September 11, 2023. Except for members of a handful of sprawling northern and rural ridings, all member wishing to cast the ballot were required to do so in person with a paper ballot on November 25 and 26, 2023.

Upon the conclusion of the balloting, the ballot boxes were sealed and transported to the party headquarter in Toronto, and to the Metro Toronto Convention Centre for counting on December 2, 2023. The ballots cast in each Liberal riding association were counted separately, with each provincial electoral district being allocated 100 points, to be awarded to the leadership contestants in proportion to the number of first preference votes they received. Each of the party's ten recognized student clubs were allocated 50 points, and each of the party's recognized eight women's clubs were allocated 5 points.

Ballots were be counted on December 2, 2023. The first preference of all ballots were tallied in each count, with the candidate with the least weighted first preferences eliminated and their vote distributed base on second preference, and the process repeating until a candidate emerged with 50% of the vote. The counting process was smoother than most party officials and campaign operative have anticipated. The result was known in the counting room by mid-afternoon, well in advance of the time major networks had anticipated to carry their live coverage of the announcement.

== Timeline ==
- June 2, 2022 – Ontario general election held, resulting in a second consecutive majority PC government. The Liberals won 8 seats, falling short of official party status. Party leader Steven Del Duca was again defeated in his home riding and announced his resignation from leadership in his concession speech.
- July 25, 2022 – John Fraser, who previously served as interim leader from 2018 until 2020, is unanimously selected by the Ontario Liberal caucus to serve as interim leader.
- August 3, 2022 – Party executive formally ratifies selection of Fraser as interim leader.
- March 3–5, 2023 – The Ontario Liberal Party held eights hours worth of constitution plenary at its annual meeting, during which it voted to eliminate delegated convention as the final step for leadership election and mandated that future leaders be elected directly by party members casting ranked ballots. It also adopted a vote tabulation system substantially similar to systems used by the federal Liberals and Conservatives, and the Ontario PC Party, retaining the key premise that all electoral districts associations having equal weight in leadership contests. It however diverged from the federal Liberals in continuing to grant significant weight to student liberal clubs in the leadership election. The annual meeting also saw the party's first hotly contested election for party president since 1999. (Note: when Peterson era ministers Greg Sorbara and Alvin Curling competed for the post) Former Cambridge mayor and provincial transportation minister Kathryn McGarry emerged victorious.
- April 16, 2023 – OLP executive council announced timeline and fee schedule for the leadership contest
- May 8, 2023 – Nathaniel Erskine-Smith, federal MP for Beaches East York, announced his candidacy.
- May 28, 2023 – Ted Hsu, MPP for Kingston and the Island, announced his candidacy. A former federal MP, Hsu landed one of the Liberals' only two gains in the 2022 election, and was the only caucus members not elected from Ottawa or Toronto,
- June 3, 2023 – Yasir Naqvi, federal MP for Ottawa Centre and a senior minister in the Wynne ministry, announced his candidacy.
- June 14, 2023 – Bonnie Crombie, Mayor of Mississauga and a former Liberal MP, announced her candidacy.
- July 4, 2023 – Adil Shamji, MPP for Don Valley East first elected in 2022, announced his candidacy.
- July 8, 2023 – OLP President Kathryn McGarry releases detailed process information for the leadershio contest
- August 15, 2023 – Party announced the five debates and locations.
- September 5, 2023 – Candidate registration deadline.
- September 11, 2023 – Membership deadline to be eligible to vote in the leadership election as party member. The party initially estimated the total eligible voting members to be around 80,000.
- September 14, 2023 – First official leadership debate held in Thunder Bay.
- September 20, 2023 – Unofficial leadership debate held at Toronto Metropolitan University Democracy Forum, hosted by the Toronto Star.
- September 28, 2023 – Shamji dropped out of the leadership race and endorsed Crombie.
- October 1, 2023 – Second official leadership debate held in Stratford.
- October 24, 2023 – Third official leadership debate held at the Isabel Bader Theatre at the University of Toronto.
- October 26, 2023 – OLP announced that the membership review and duplicate removal process substantially completed with 103,206 members on the membership list.
- November 8, 2023 – Fourth official leadership debate held in Ottawa.
- November 9, 2023 – Yasir Naqvi and Nate Erskine-Smith held a joint press conference at Queen's Park announcing an agreement to each urge their supporters to select each other as their second preference. The pact also entailed cooperation of the two teams on volunteer deployment and get-out-the-vote efforts.
- November 15, 2023 – Leadership debate held on The Agenda with Steve Paikin, hosted by TVO, the first episode of The Agenda since the conclusion of the TVO Strike.
- November 19, 2023 – Fifth and last official leadership debate held in Brampton.
- November 25–26, 2023 – Ranked ballots cast in-person by party members.
- December 2, 2023 – Ballots counted, with the new leader announced the same day.
- December 2, 2023 – At 4:34 PM, Crombie was declared the new leader of the Ontario Liberal Party by party president Kathryn McGarry and MPP Stephen Blais.

== Campaign ==
The party formally announced the start of the leadership election process on April 16, 2023, announcing the timeline, candidate registration requirements and fee schedule for the election.

There had been debate on the timing of the election, with campaigns that were actively exploring bids pushing for an earlier date in 2023, and others who wanted to delay the contest until late 2023 or early 2024, in the hopes of encouraging more candidates to join the race. In the end the party selected November 25–26 as the voting days with a new leader being announced on December 2, 2023.

Nate Erskine-Smith was the first to officially announce and register as a candidate, doing so on May 8, 2023. He was followed by Ted Hsu and Yasir Naqvi, who announced with a week of each other at the end of May/beginning of June, and who, like Erskine-Smith, had been actively organizing and campaigning in the preceding months.

Bonnie Crombie announced her candidacy on June 14, this was after announcing an exploratory committee in May and the Ford government announcing legislation to dissolve the Regional Municipality of Peel and make Mississauga a Single-tier municipality. The day after launching her campaign, Crombie was criticized for comments she made in regards to the greenbelt, suggesting that if she were premier she would be consider allowing land inside the greenbelt to be made open to development, although Crombie later clarified her position.

Adil Shamji announced his candidacy at the beginning of July.

In July, an interview featuring Nate Erskine-Smith appeared in the Toronto Star where he critiqued Bonnie Crombie's desire to move the party to the centre-right, her position on the Greenbelt and her age. In response to that interview, Crombie accused Erskine-Smith of sexism and ageism relating to his comments saying "we should be thinking of this as what party do we want to build for the next 15-20 years."

On August 15, the party announced the dates and locations for the five debates that are scheduled to be held across the province starting on September 14 in Thunder Bay.

On August 19, Adil Shamji expressed concerns about election interference after some of his social media accounts were disabled. Shamji's Twitter account was suspended over complaints of spam, then his Facebook account was disabled, preventing the campaign from advertising on the platform. Shamji called the complaints frivolous and malicious and suggested the potential that the suspensions were part of a coordinated attack attempt to silence or hinder his campaign.

On September 11, the party announced, following the deadline to join the party, that the total number of individuals who would be eligible to vote in the leadership election would be over 80,000. The party later announced that, following verification checks and the removal of duplicate submissions, that 103,206 members in total will be eligible to vote.

On September 28, Adil Shamji announced he will be dropping out of the leadership race to endorse Bonnie Crombie.

Nate Erskine-Smith and Yasir Naqvi released a joint statement on November 9, announcing an agreement to ask their supporters to select each other as their number two choice, and also to co-ordinate volunteer & get-out-the-vote efforts. This agreement was viewed as an attempt to block Bonnie Crombie, the perceived front-runner in the race; both stated that they have found “common ground” during the leadership race and believed they were the best choices to beat Premier Doug Ford's Progressive Conservatives in the 2026 election.

=== Debates ===
Debates among candidates for the 2023 Ontario Liberal Party leadership election
No.	Date	Place	Host	Language	Participants: P Participant N Not invited A Absent invitee O Out of race				
No.	Date	Place	Host	Language	Crombie	Erskine-Smith	Hsu	Naqvi	Shamji
1	September 14, 2023	Thunder Bay	Ontario Liberal Party	English	P	P	P	P	P
2	September 20, 2023	Toronto	Toronto Metropolitan University & Toronto Star	English	P	P	P	P	P
3	October 1, 2023	Stratford	Ontario Liberal Party	English	P	P	P	P	O
4	October 12, 2023	Toronto	The Hurle Burly podcast	English	P	P	P	P	O
5	October 24, 2023	Toronto	Ontario Liberal Party	English	P	P	P	P	O
6	November 8, 2023	Ottawa	Ontario Liberal Party	Bilingual	P	P	P	P	O
7	November 13, 2023	Toronto	newsBeyond, AEFO, OECTA & OSSTF	Bilingual	P	P	P	P	O
8	November 15, 2023	Toronto	TVO	English	P	P	P	P	O
9	November 19, 2023	Brampton	Ontario Liberal Party	English	P	P	P	P	O

=== Policy and issues ===
2023 Ontario Liberal Leadership – issue and policy commitments
Issue	Crombie	Erskine-Smith	Hsu	Naqvi	Shamji
Economy					Create a new paid statutory holiday, in which each individual Ontario can pick their own day.
Education	Repealing Bill 124 and introduce a one-year teaching degree; Reduce the average class size, including creating a class size cap for grades 4 to 12 and lowering the existing class size cap for junior kindergarten to grade 3; Double the annual investment in addressing the repair backlog of schools; Create free, on-campus, after-school supplementary homework help program, guided by qualified teachers; Eliminate the online learning graduation requirement for high school students introduced by the Ford government; Expand skilled trades learning programs with a particular focus on enhancing participation of women, members of equity deserving groups, and racialized communities in skilled trades sector and support union-led skilled trades training initiatives; Eliminate the provincial portion of interest on OSAP loans, including for former students who are still paying off student loans. Increase the annual income threshold for OSAP repayment to $40,000 and extending the grace period for the provincial portion of OSAP to two years. Increasing OSAP funding for all eligible students, with a particular focus on supporting low-income and underrepresented groups; Deliver academic programs that are aligned with the needs of the labour market, hands-on training and expanded experiential learning opportunities such as co-op and paid internships.	Eliminate waitlists for special education, cap class sizes, hire more educators, and strengthen the curriculum in collaboration with educators.; Expand funding for extracurriculars, broaden access to mental health supports, and implement a universal healthy school food program based on the work of the Coalition for Healthy School Food.; Fund necessary repairs and upgrades, ensure access to high-quality internet, proper air conditioning and filtration, expanding green retrofits, keep schools accessible to rural and northern communities.; Create space for everyone to be who they are, support reconciliation, strengthen French education, and improve school safety.; Commit to fair bargaining, encouraging teacher-led professional development, deliver employment dignity for support staff.			Mandatory standards for ratios between students and teachers.; Eliminating EQAO testing, adapting curriculum to focus on practical subjects, exposing high school students to the trades, and keeping students in the classrooms.; Eliminate infrastructure backlog.
Energy		Reduce Ontario's emissions by 50% by 2030 and reach net zero by 2040; Build a net zero electricity grid by 2030.; Rapidly accelerate the deployment of zero emission vehicles, electric vehicle charging infrastructure, and green retrofits for homes, small businesses, and public buildings.	Build renewables and storage, enough to displace base load natural gas generation.; Build out remaining hydropower resources; Continue with plans to refurbish and expand nuclear power.; Promote hydrogen blending at existing gas plants to make them cleaner with no loss of flexibility.		
Environment		Protect 30% of Ontario's nature by 2030, including the Greenbelt, and restore the role of conservation authorities.; Establishing Ontario as a global leader in critical minerals, clean manufacturing and other clean technologies.; Enacting accountability legislation that sets strong interim targets, and establishes an independent body to hold the government accountable for its progress.	Protect the Greenbelt		
Health Care	Legislate 10 paid sick days for all healthcare workers; Fair and equitable pay for all nurses and PSW's; Streamline licensing and accreditation process for internationally trained doctors, nurses and other healthcare workers; Add seats and residency spaces in Ontario's post-secondary institutions; Invest in hospitals so they can recruit and retain staff without depending on paying private agencies; Create a centralized referral system	Offer fair wages and better working conditions for health care workers, expanded placement and training opportunities in priority areas like primary and home-care, and create clear path to credential recognition for foreign-trained professionals.; Provide family health teams for everyone through expanded scope of practice for talented health professionals and increasing public investment to bring it up to par with the national average.; Expanded mental health access with up to 12 hours of talk therapy for every Ontarian, better support for mental health for kids, and action to treat substance use as a health issue.; Adopt Canada's new long-term care standards, make new investments in home and community-based care, and improve support systems for caregivers.; Create dedicated northern and rural healthcare strategy.	Collect complete, timely and standardized data on the supply of and demand for the health sector's workforce and services.; Invest outside of acute care and permanent community paramedicine.; Invest in alternatives to Long Term Care; Invest in primary care innovation; Support mental health, expand access to mental health services in schools, at-risk communities and for trauma related professions; Empower local decision making, invest in prevention	Streamline and simplify the licensing process for internationally trained doctors and nurses, establishing a reverse onus assumption.; Modernize the Registered Health Professions Act and increasing funding for college and university spaces in Ontario.; Create a new OHIP-like insurance plan that provides universal coverage of mental health services; Update occupational health and safety laws to obligate employers to promote safe and mentally resilient workplaces.; Minimum investment in mental health services equivalent to 10 per cent of provincial health funding	Fast-track the credentialing of foreign-trained doctors; Set aside medical school spaces for Ontario students and incentivize graduates to choose family practice, especially in rural Ontario, develop a province-wide, data-driven staffing strategy to get more doctors where they're needed most.; Streamline how physicians make referrals for specialists, tests and services.; Promote team-based primary care with nurses, social workers, pharmacists, and mental health workers working hand in hand with physicians.; Providing more ways for family physicians to charge the government for the services they provide; Create mentorship programs pairing new family doctors with established veterans, and make it attractive for retired family doctors to return to practice
Housing		End exclusionary zoning, and removing barriers to smart and sustainable growth; Build and protect public-minded and affordable rental housing; Strengthen tenant protections in place and add resources to reduce the Landlord and Tenant Board (LTB) backlog; Create beneficial ownership registry, which requires companies holding real estate to identify their beneficial owners	Build a surplus of homes until rental vacancy rates of 3-4%, then rely on portable housing benefits instead of rent control.; Legislate planning measures for medium-density housing, building self sufficient communities with mixed neighborhoods and transportation; Allow municipalities to generate revenue for service provision; Support different residential options	Implement all of the recommendations of the Ontario Government's Housing Affordability Task Force.; End development charges altogether and replace them with outcome-based funding for cities and communities to transfer the burden of new developments from homebuyers and renters to the province.; Make provincial and municipal land available by default for affordable non-profit housing development.; Create real rent control for all of Ontario, enact a ban on renovictions, build more rental units and end the backlog at the Landlord Tenant Board.	Eliminate Exclusionary Zoning province-wide. Allow multiplex housing, multi-tenant housing, the conversion of underutilized or redundant commercial space for residential or mixed purposes, ensure local and regional housing plans also come with infrastructure plans to support them. Incentivize municipalities to meet or exceed their housing targets with the promise of additional capital funding that can be used for locally relevant community infrastructure.; Work with municipalities to adopt income-based definitions and targets for deeply affordable, affordable and attainable housing that work for their regional contexts, create a framework that incentivizes and funds municipalities to create their own inclusionary zoning policies in consultation with stakeholders and developers, and invest in purpose-built low-income and supportive housing projects.; Provide incentives to see more rental-specific buildings developed, ensure the fair application of rent control to renters regardless of when their building was constructed, close loopholes that allow renters to be renovicted and landlords to be held hostage by tenants who act in bad faith, and fund the Landlord and Tenant Board to clear the overwhelming backlog in cases.; Establish an Ontario Home Building Corporation to incentivize and finance housing development.; Work with private, non-profit, and municipal partners to prioritize immediate construction on over 300,000 development-ready unbuilt housing units.; Invest in the Ontario Land Tribunal to allow faster adjudication of land use matters.
Labour		Develop a sectoral bargaining system in relevant sectors that allows workers from multiple employers to use their combined numbers to advocate for better wages, benefits and working conditions from large employers.; Disallow employers from hiring temporary or replacement workers where the employer has locked out employees.; Develop a bill of rights for gig workers and workers on electronic platforms that ensures transparency in compensation, allowing workers to join a union or better advocate on their own behalf.; Increase minimum wage by $0.25 annually above inflation for a limited number of years.; Implement 10 paid sick days per year for all workers in Ontario.; Strike a labour task force and act upon recommendations to better support workers, including consideration of a regional living wage, increasing paid vacation time and accommodating hybrid work; Introduce policies to close the gender pay gap and ensure respect in the workplace.			
Northern Ontario	Attract more students to acquire healthcare degrees and stay in Northern Ontario upon graduation by offering free tuition tied to multi-year service agreements.; Strike a Task Force to identify and address the gaps that exist in the current structure of the Northern Ontario Travel Grant and make adequate investment in this program to ensure that residents of Northern Ontario can access care timely.; Prevent school closures that force students to travel long distances and provide educators with economic incentives to stay in the North. Deliver targeted programs to improve retention and graduation rates in Northern schools by hiring guidance counselors to provide academic and career planning.; Expedite the process of critical minerals extraction in an environmentally responsible manner and while recognizing the rights, equity, and well-being of Indigenous peoples.; Meaningfully involve Indigenous communities in all matters that affect their lands, resources, and rights.; Boost the Northern Ontario Energy Tax Credit and the Northern Energy Advantage Program. Strengthen the Northern Ontario Heritage Fund.; Widen the final 68 km of Highway 69 to 4 lanes and designate Highways 69, 11, and 17 as Class 1 Highways.; Enhance northern intercommunity connectivity through broadband and digital infrastructure enhancement.; Improve subsidized intercommunity bus and work collaboratively with the Ontario Northland Transportation Commission to expedite the implementation of the Ontario Northlander passenger rail service, enhancing regional transportation networks.	Support northern municipalities with new and increased infrastructure investment in roads, broadband, and affordable housing. Develop an integrated housing and transit strategy for the 9 northern communities served by public transit.; Advance the economic opportunity in critical minerals and supply chains by investing in R&D and expediting the permitting and regulatory approvals process, in partnership with Indigenous communities.; Leverage northern Ontario as a destination that is affordable with employment opportunities, including through secondary and post-secondary programs, and with incentives to attract and retain workers in sectors facing labour shortages, including healthcare and the skilled trades.; Develop and adequately fund a Northern and Rural health-care strategy to address workforce retention and ER closures.; Increase admissions at the Northern Ontario School of Medicine and provide more tuition subsidies for students committed to staying in the North long-term.		Provide incentives for doctors and nurses who are willing to practice in underserved communities in the North.; Grow the population of Northern Ontario through improved connectivity and educational and economic opportunities.; Position Northern Ontario as a world leader in critical mineral extraction and processing while respecting Indigenous rights.	
Party Reform					Open candidate nominations within 60 days of the leadership convention and aiming to secure 25% of nominations in the first six months afterwards, while ensuring that nomination rules are clear, accessible and publicly available.; Establish Provincial Liberal Association (PLA) renewal guide, champion issues-based campaigns that PLAs can use to mobilize and allow PLA's greater access to central party support, funds, data and polling information.; Re-establish party policy conventions

== Candidates ==
=== Bonnie Crombie ===
Bonnie Crombie Campaign Logo

Bonnie Crombie, 63, was the Mayor of Mississauga, Ontario (2014–2024) and was previously the MP for Mississauga—Streetsville between 2008 and 2011. She has an MBA and was an entrepreneur and public affairs consultant before entering politics.

Date announced: June 14, 2023
Date registered with Elections Ontario: June 13, 2023
Campaign website: www.bonnieforleader.ca
Campaign slogan: "Strong Experienced Leadership."
Contributions received: $1,314,053.11
Campaign expenditures: $1,193,719.46
Endorsements: see 2023 Ontario Liberal Party leadership endorsements#Bonnie Crombie

=== Nathaniel Erskine-Smith ===
Nate Erskine-Smith Campaign Logo

Nathaniel Erskine-Smith, 39, is the MP for Beaches—East York (2015–present), and was a litigation lawyer prior to his election to parliament.

Date announced: May 8, 2023
Date registered with Elections Ontario: May 16, 2023
Campaign website: www.meetnate.ca
Campaign slogan: "Serious Leadership. For a change."
Contributions received: $574,073.20
Campaign expenditures: $587,095.59
Endorsements: see 2023 Ontario Liberal Party leadership endorsements#Nate Erskine-Smith

=== Ted Hsu ===
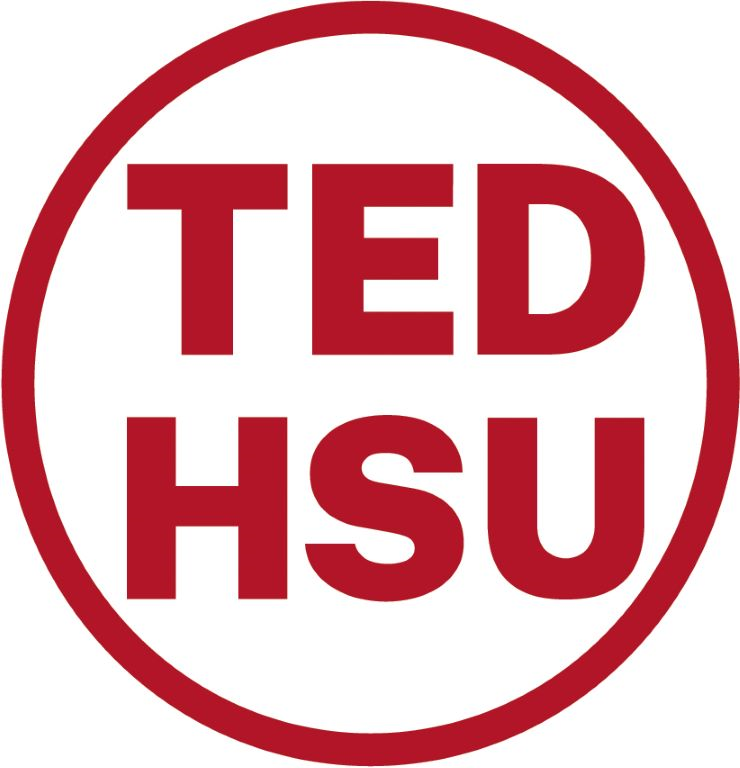
Ted Hsu Campaign Logo

Ted Hsu, 59, is the MPP for Kingston and the Islands (2022–present) and was previously the MP for the same riding between 2011 and 2015. He completed a PhD in physics and worked as a physicist and in investment banking outside of politics.

Date announced: May 28, 2023
Date registered with Elections Ontario: May 20, 2023
Campaign website: www.tedhsu.ca
Campaign slogan: "A fresh start."
Contributions received: $437,705.71
Campaign expenditures: $437,705.71
Endorsements: see 2023 Ontario Liberal Party leadership endorsements#Ted Hsu

=== Yasir Naqvi ===
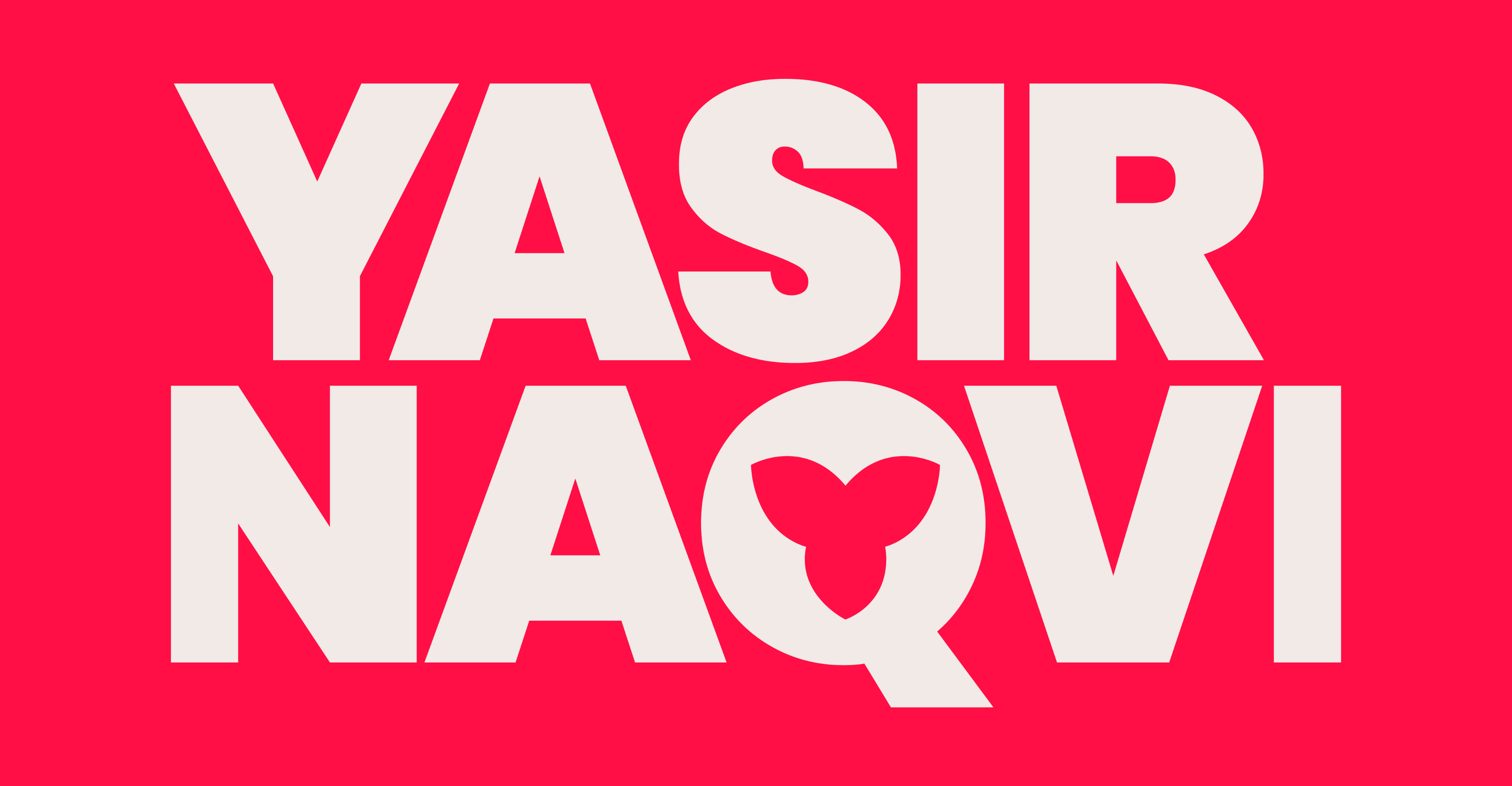
Yasir Naqvi Campaign Logo

Yasir Naqvi, 50, is the MP for Ottawa Centre (2021–present), and was previously MPP for the same riding between 2007 and 2018). He served in the provincial cabinet as Attorney General (2016–18), Government House Leader (2014–18), Minister of Community Safety and Correctional Services (2014–16), and Minister of Labour (2013–14). He served three terms as president of the Ontario Liberal Party between 2009 and 2013, resigning upon his elevation to cabinet. Outside of politics, he was an international trade lawyer and served as the CEO of the Institute for Canadian Citizenship.

Date announced: June 3, 2023
Date registered with Elections Ontario: June 2, 2023
Campaign website: Yasir Naqvi
Campaign slogan: "Libéral. Leader."
Contributions received: $475,944.50
Campaign expenditures: $479,255.66
Endorsements: see 2023 Ontario Liberal Party leadership endorsements#Yasir Naqvi

== Withdrawn candidates ==
=== Adil Shamji ===
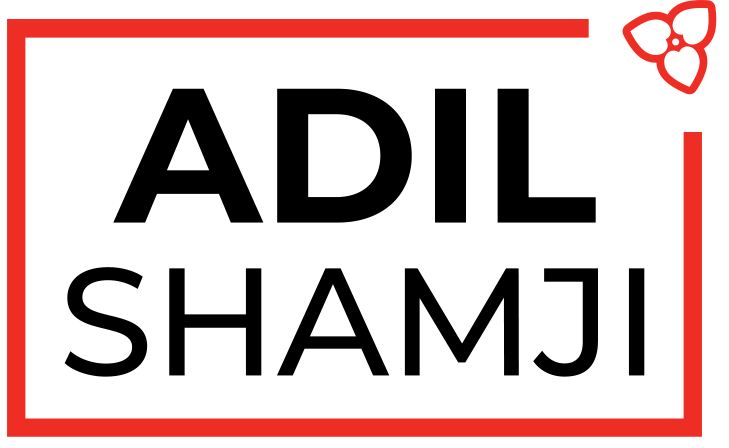
Adil Shamji Campaign Logo

Adil Shamji, is the MPP for Don Valley East (2022–present) and serves as critic for Health, Northern Development, Indigenous Affairs, and Colleges and Universities. Prior to his election, he was an Emergency physician and has completed a Master of Public Policy.

Date announced: July 4, 2023
Date registered with Elections Ontario: July 4, 2023
Date of withdrawal: September 29, 2023
Endorsed: Bonnie Crombie
Campaign website: www.joinadil.ca
Campaign slogan: "For all of us."
Contributions received: $119,375.00
Campaign expenditures: $131,879.20
Endorsements: see 2023 Ontario Liberal Party leadership endorsements#Adil Shamji

== Declined ==
- Navdeep Bains, federal Minister of Innovation, Science and Industry (2015–2021), MP for Mississauga—Malton (2015–2021), MP for Mississauga—Brampton South (2004–2011)
- Yvan Baker, MP for Etobicoke Centre (2019–present), MPP for Etobicoke Centre (2014–2018) (Endorsed Crombie)
- Maurizio Bevilacqua, Mayor of Vaughan, Ontario (2010–2022), federal Secretary of State (International Financial Institutions) (2002–2003), federal Secretary of State (Science, Research and Development) (2002), MP for Vaughan (2004–2010), MP for Vaughan—King—Aurora (1997–2004), MP for York North (1988–1997)
- Stephen Blais, MPP for Orléans (2020–present), Ottawa City Councillor (2010–2020)
- Stephanie Bowman, MPP for Don Valley West (2022–present) (Endorsed Crombie)
- Lucille Collard, MPP for Ottawa—Vanier (2020–present) (Endorsed Naqvi)
- Michael Coteau, MP for Don Valley East (2021–2025), MPP for Don Valley East (2011–2021), Minister of Community and Social Services (2018), Minister of Children and Youth Services (2016–2018), Minister of Tourism, Culture and Sport (2014–2016), Minister of Citizenship and Immigration (2013–2014), finished second in the 2020 leadership election.
- Mohamad Fakih, philanthropist and founder and CEO of Paramount Fine Foods
- John Fraser, Interim Leader (2018–2020; 2022–2023), Parliamentary Leader (2020–present), MPP for Ottawa South (2013–present)
- Mitzie Hunter, MPP for Scarborough—Guildwood (2013–2023), Minister of Advanced Education and Skills Development (2018), Minister of Education (2016–2018), finished fourth in the 2020 leadership election
- Jeff Lehman, CEO and Chair of Muskoka District (2022–present), Mayor of Barrie, Ontario (2010–2022), 2022 Ontario general election candidate in Barrie—Springwater—Oro-Medonte, two-time of Chair of Ontario's Big City Mayors association.
- Mary-Margaret McMahon, MPP for Beaches—East York (2022–present), Toronto City Councillor (2010–2018) (Endorsed Erskine-Smith)
- Bill Mauro, Mayor of Thunder Bay (2018–2022), MPP for Thunder Bay—Atikokan (2003–2018), Minister of Municipal Affairs and Housing (2016–2018), Minister of Natural Resources and Forestry (2014–2016), Minister of Municipal Affairs (2014)
- Mike Schreiner, leader of the Green Party of Ontario (2009–present), MPP for Guelph (2018–present)
- Glenn Thibeault, MPP for Sudbury (2015–2018), Minister of Energy (2016–2018), NDP MP for Sudbury (2008–2015) (Endorsed Naqvi)
- Arif Virani, MP for Parkdale—High Park (2015–2025), Minister of Justice and Attorney General of Canada (2023–2025)

== Endorsements ==
As typical in leadership contests of the two main political parties in Canada and other countries with government based on the Westminster model, the public support of incumbent caucus members were the endorsements most prized by the contestants and most often cited by journalists and pundits.

The Ontario Liberals only expand their caucus by one seat at the end of the 2022 Ontario election to a total of eight. Its rank was briefly reduced to seven due to a resignation, but expanded to nine late July that year following two byelections. Of the seven caucus members that were in office when the contest started in earnest in early summer, two were contestants (Ted Hsu & Adil Shamji), two declared neutrality (John Fraser as interim leader, and Stephen Blais as co-chair of the contest debates and result event), leaving only three potential caucus endorsements up for grab.

The three contestants who were not sitting MPPs each laid claims to one of the three MPPs as they launched their campaigns in late May to early June: Erskine-Smith was backed by his local MPP Mary-Margaret McMahon, Naqvi had his neighboring MPP Lucille Collard as a campaign co-chair, and Crombie's campaign launch was headlined by Stephanie Bowman. The Liberals welcomed two new MPPs in July following by-elections intensely contested by the governing Conservatives. Erskine-Smith was boosted in late August by the endorsement of Karen McCrimmon, the former Kanata MP who retired in 2021 but re-entered the fray and wrestled the provincial seat from the Conservatives. Crombie seconded her second caucus endorsement in late September when Adil Shamji ended his own bid and joined her campaign (though he did not bring with him his three endorsers). Andrea Hazel, the new MPP for Scarborough who defeated a star candidate handpicked by the Conservative premier, announced her support for Naqvi in late October, as the contest entered its final month.

=== Endorsements tallies ===
	MPPs		MPs	
	Current	Former	Current	Former
Total available	9	~160	78	~240
Bonnie Crombie	2	23	15	5
Nathaniel Erskine-Smith	2	2	5 (Note: 11 MPs representing electoral district outside of Ontario excluded)	6 (Note: 1 former MPs represented electoral district outside of Ontario excluded)
Ted Hsu	1 (self)	3	1	3 (Note: 1 former MPs who is not a Liberal party member excluded)
Yasir Naqvi	2	20	9	7

=== Diminished significance of endorsements ===
With so few caucus endorsements up for grab, the endorsements of Ontario MPs and former MPPs were again seen as indicators of strength and momentum. However, with the party foregoing the convention as the final step of the contest, the significance of such endorsements demonstrably diminished compared to the two previous contests in the preceding decades in two main ways. Firstly, MPs and former MPPs no longer have an formalized outsized votes through entitlement as automatic ex officio delegates. Secondly, their ability to influence subsequent ballot choices was also severely reduced, as there was no longer a period of reflection and intense support jockeying after the first ballot. While certain local results were clearly attributable to specific impactful endorsements, unlike the two previous contests, the general distribution of such high-profile endorsements were not reflected in first ballot results in any meaningful way. While Naqvi was frontrunner Crombie's main rival on the competitions for such endorsements, Erskine-Smith beat him by four percentage point on first ballot and gave Crombie a serious run on final ballot.

=== Regional distribution ===
While the Ontario Liberal Party abandoned the usage of delegated convention, it retained the fundamental premise of equal weighting of input among all electoral districts regardless of membership size or number of votes cast. Endorsement of individuals represented or had significant influence in regions the Liberals has not fared well in recent years (and thus had relatively small Liberal Party membership roll) were therefore seen as particularly valuable. The three main campaign all made concerted efforts in securing and highlighting such endorsements.

=== Endorsement lists ===
 Endorsements are grouped together by contestant. The list under each constestant could be sorted by types of endorser, by geographical regions, by names, or by the constituencies the endorsers represented. Endorsements were assigned to one of the following five regions basing on the region endorser represented or hailed from. The regional assignment are informal and included for ease of review. The "weight" of the region, calculated by number of electoral districts are also included for reference:
- North ~10%
- East ~15%
- Cen (Central) ~35%
- Tor. (Toronto) ~20%
- SW (Southwest) ~20%

Titles or offices held listed are current as of the December 2, 2023 when the leadership contest results were announced. This list only includes individuals who held public elected offices, or individuals/entities of prominence sufficient for their expression of support to be reported by news media.

== Opinion polling ==
=== Liberal supporters ===
Polling firm	Link	Last date of polling	Sample Size	Margin of error	Bonnie Crombie	Nathaniel Erskine-Smith	Ted Hsu	Yasir Naqvi	Other						
Polling firm	Link	Last date of polling	Sample Size	Margin of error	Pallas Data		September 27, 2023	244	Other	±3.1%	49.5%	12.3%	11.7%	2.7%	Not Sure 23.8% Adil Shamji 0%
Probit Inc.		November 29, 2022	814	±3.4%	28%	12%	3%	7%	Mitzie Hunter 13% Jeff Lehman 8% Navdeep Bains 6% Michael Coteau 5% Other 3% Maurizio Bevilacqua 3% Mary-Margaret McMahon 3% Arif Virani 3% Yvan Baker 2% Stephen Blais 2% John Fraser (Write-in) 1%						

=== All Ontarians ===
Polling firm	Link	Last date of polling	Sample Size	Margin of error	Bonnie Crombie	Nathaniel Erskine-Smith	Ted Hsu	Yasir Naqvi	Other						
Polling firm	Link	Last date of polling	Sample Size	Margin of error	Pallas Data		September 27, 2023	1,010	Other	±3.1%	29.2%	9.4%	5.9%	3.1%	Not Sure 51.2% Adil Shamji 1.2%
Angus Reid		September 6, 2023	582	±3%	31%	4%	3%	4%	Not Sure 57% Adil Shamji 2%						

== Results ==
= Eliminated from next round
= Winner

Results by round
Candidate	1st round		2nd round				3rd round			
Candidate	Points	Votes	Points	+/-	Votes	+/-	Points	+/-	Votes	+/-
Bonnie Crombie	5,559; 42.96%	9,314; 41.07%	6,047; 46.73%	488; 3.77%	10,176; 45.40%	862; 4.33%	6,911; 53.40%	864; 6.67%	11,325; 52.35%	1,149; 6.95%
Nathaniel Erskine-Smith	3,320; 25.66%	6,083; 26.82%	3,792; 29.30%	472; 3.64%	6,944; 30.99%	861; 4.17%	6,029; 46.59%	2,237; 17.29%	10,307; 47.65%	3,363; 16.66%
Yasir Naqvi	2,760; 21.33%	4,705; 20.75%	3,101; 23.96%	341; 2.63%	5,294; 23.62%	589; 2.87%	Eliminated			
Ted Hsu	1,300; 10.05%	2,578; 11.36%	Eliminated							
Total	12,940	22,680	12,940	0	22,414	-266	12,940	0	21,632	-782

First round
Crombie	42.96%
Erskine-Smith	25.66%
Naqvi	23.96%
Hsu	10.05%

Final round
Crombie	53.40%
Erskine-Smith	46.59%
