= Bill Goodfellow =

Canadian politician

William Arthur Goodfellow
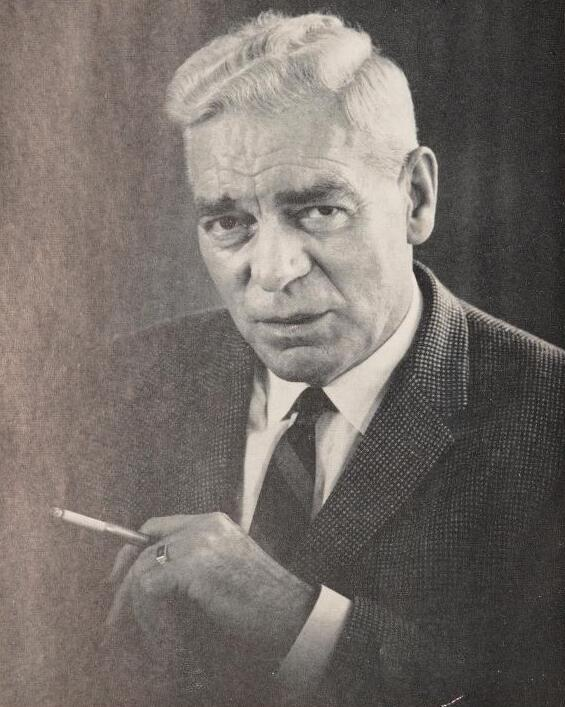
- Goodfellow, c. 1962

Ontario MPP
- In office 1943–1963
- Preceded by: Harold Norman Carr
- Succeeded by: Russell Daniel Rowe
- Constituency: Northumberland

Personal details
- Born: August 18, 1901; Brighton Township, Northumberland County, Ontario
- Died: May 10, 1983 (aged 81); Brighton, Ontario
- Political party: Progressive Conservative
- Occupation: Farmer

William Arthur Goodfellow (August 18, 1901 – May 10, 1983) was a politician in Ontario, Canada. He was a Progressive Conservative member of the Legislative Assembly of Ontario from 1943 to 1963 who represented the riding of Northumberland. He served as a cabinet minister in the governments of George Drew, Thomas Kennedy, Leslie Frost, and John Robarts.

== Background ==
Goodfellow was born on the family farm in Northumberland County, Ontario. He attended Warkworth High School and the Ontario Agricultural College. In 1922, he was elected as a Councillor in Brighton Township, later becoming Deputy-Reeve and then Reeve. On September 20, 1924, he married Dora Agusta Philp (June 24, 1903 – February 19, 1986) at the farm of the bride's parents in Colborne, Ontario. They had five children. in 1963, Goodfellow was remarried, this time to Barbara Calderwood (January 6, 1910 – 1993).

He is buried in Mount Olivet Cemetery, Brighton, Ontario.

== Politics ==
First elected in the general election in 1943, Goodfellow was re-elected in the general elections in 1945, 1948, 1951, 1955 and 1959. He served as member of the George A. Drew, Thomas Laird Kennedy, Leslie Frost and John Robarts majority Progressive Conservative governments. From 1943 to 1946, he served as a backbench member of the government, sitting on an average of six Standing Committees of the Legislative Assembly. On January 7, 1946, he was appointed as the Minister of Public Welfare, a position he held until August 17, 1955. From August 17, 1955 until November 1, 1956, he served as Minister of Municipal Affairs. For several months, he held two Ministerial positions as, on August 1, 1956, he was also appointed as the Minister of Agriculture. He kept that portfolio until November 8, 1961, at which time he was named as the Minister of Highways. On October 25, 1962, he gave up that position and served as Minister without portfolio until the end of his fifth term in office. In October 1963, Goodfellow retired from political life.

=== Cabinet posts ===
Ontario provincial government of John Robarts
Cabinet post (1)
Predecessor	Office	Successor
Fred Cass	Minister of Highways; 1961-1962; Minister without Portfolio (1962-1963)	Charles MacNaughton
Ontario provincial government of Leslie Frost
Cabinet posts (3)
Predecessor	Office	Successor
Fletcher Stewart Thomas	Minister of Agriculture; 1956-1961	Bill Stewart
George Dunbar	Minister of Municipal Affairs; 1955-1956	Bill Warrender
himself	Minister of Public Welfare; 1949-1955	Louis-Pierre Cécile
Ontario provincial government of Thomas Kennedy
Cabinet post (1)
Predecessor	Office	Successor
himself	Minister of Public Welfare; 1948-1949	himself
Ontario provincial government of George A. Drew
Cabinet post (1)
Predecessor	Office	Successor
Percy Vivian	Minister of Public Welfare; 1946-1948	himself
