= Howard Sheppard =

Canadian politician

Ontario MPP
- In office 1981–1987
- Preceded by: Russell Rowe
- Succeeded by: Joan Fawcett
- Constituency: Northumberland

Personal details
- Born: October 6, 1933 Codrington, Ontario
- Died: September 16, 2013 (aged 79)
- Party: Conservative
- Spouse: Bernice Hagerman
- Children: 4
- Occupation: Insurance agent

Howard Nicholas Sheppard (October 6, 1933 – September 16, 2013) was a politician in Ontario, Canada. He was a Progressive Conservative member of the Legislative Assembly of Ontario from 1981 to 1987. He represented the riding of Northumberland.

== Background ==
Sheppard was born in Codrington, Ontario, and educated at Campbellford District High School. He worked as a farmer and as an insurance agent with the Hamilton Township Farmers Mutual Fire Insurance Company. Sheppard was married to Bernice (née Hagerman) and they had four children.

== Politics ==
He began his career in municipal politics in the 1960s. Sheppard served on the Northumberland County Council, was a school trustee, and served as director of the Milk Marketing Board.

He was elected to the Ontario legislature in the 1981 provincial election, defeating Liberal candidate William Wyatt by 3,616 votes in Northumberland. He served as a backbench supporter of the governments of Bill Davis and Frank Miller. He was re-elected in the 1985 election, defeating Liberal Joan Fawcett by 1,850 votes.

The Progressive Conservatives were defeated in the legislature soon after this election, and Sheppard served for two years as an opposition member. He lost to Joan Fawcett by 1,326 votes in the 1987 election.

Sheppard served as reeve of Alnwick from 1994 to 2000, and supported a single-tier municipality for Northumberland. He lost his bid for re-election in 2000.

== Later life ==
The following year, he was appointed by the provincial government of Mike Harris to the board of health for the Haliburton, Kawartha and Pine Ridge District Health Unit.
