= Rob Milligan (politician) =

Canadian politician

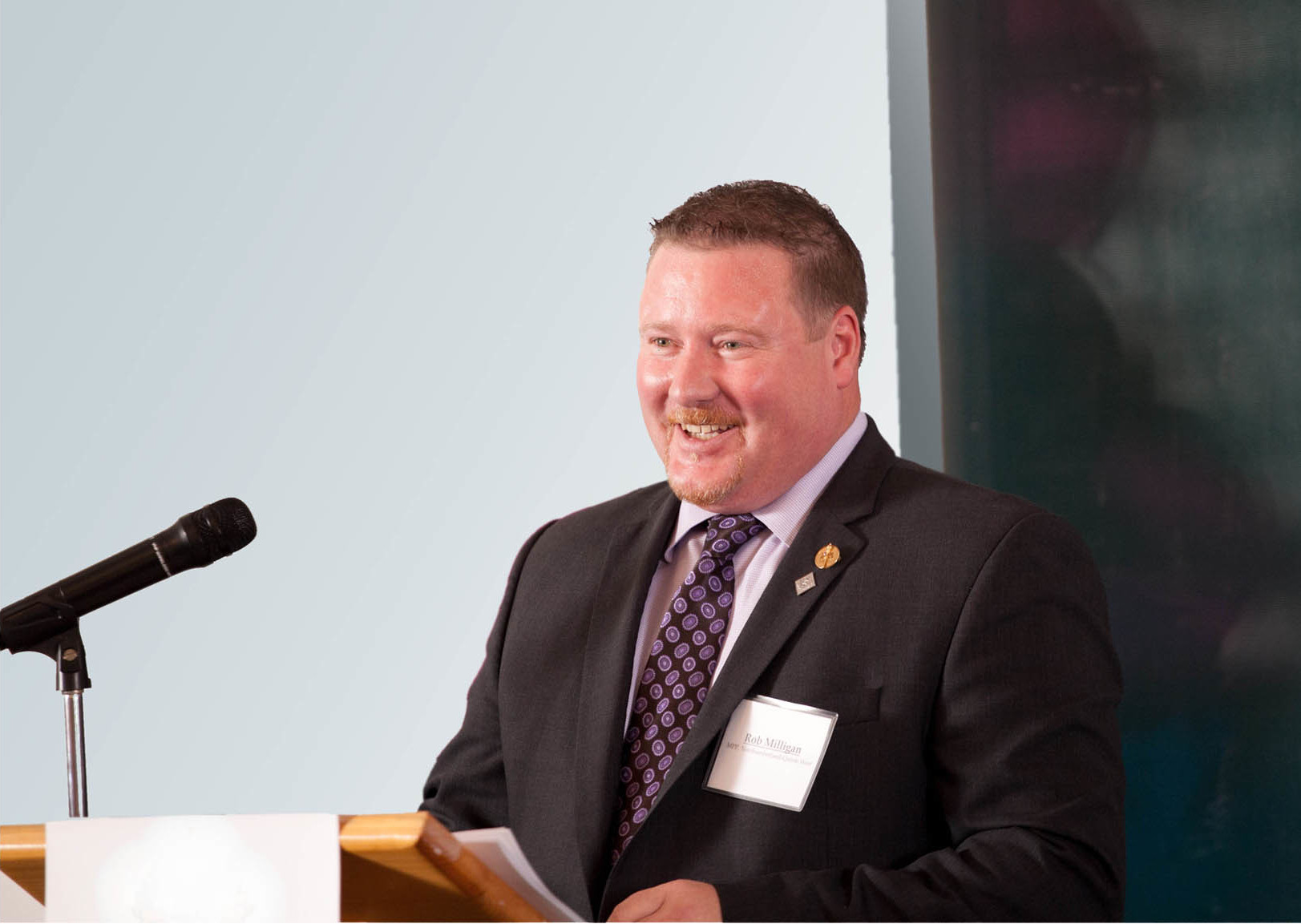

Ontario MPP
- In office 2011–2014
- Preceded by: Lou Rinaldi
- Succeeded by: Lou Rinaldi
- Constituency: Northumberland—Quinte West

Personal details
- Born: February 6, 1971 (age 55) Toronto, Ontario
- Party: Progressive Conservative
- Spouse: Single
- Children: 2
- Occupation: Teacher

Rob Milligan (born February 6, 1971) is a former politician in Ontario, Canada. He was a Progressive Conservative member of the Legislative Assembly of Ontario from 2011 to 2014. He represented the riding of Northumberland—Quinte West.

== Background ==
Milligan grew up in Warkworth, Ontario in the municipality of Trent Hills. He taught History and English at Campbellford District High School from 1998 until his election to the legislature. He is married with two young daughters and operates a small beef farm.

== Politics ==
In the 2011 provincial election he ran as the Progressive Conservative candidate in the riding of Northumberland—Quinte West. He defeated Liberal incumbent Lou Rinaldi by 707 votes. In the 2014 election he was in a rematch with Rinaldi but this time lost to him by 3,836 votes.

During his tenure in parliament, he served as critic of interprovincial trade and education issues.

In September 2017, Milligan sought the Progressive Conservative nomination for the new riding of Northumberland—Peterborough South. Milligan lost the nomination to David Piccini on September 23, 2017.

== Electoral record ==
2011 Ontario general election
Party	Candidate	Votes	%	±%
Progressive Conservative	Rob Milligan	19,279	39.80	+8.59
Liberal	Lou Rinaldi	18,572	38.34	-7.03
New Democratic	Kira Mees	8,589	17.73	+4.52
Green	Judy Smith Torrie	1,483	3.06	-7.14
Libertarian	Jeffrey McLarty	357	0.74	
Independent	Richard Martin Rieger	159	0.33	
Total valid votes		48,439	100.00	
Total rejected, unmarked and declined ballots		182	0.37	
Turnout		48,621	51.88	
Eligible voters		93,720		
Progressive Conservative gain from Liberal		Swing		+7.81
Source: Elections Ontario

2014 Ontario general election
** Preliminary results — Not yet official **
Party	Candidate	Votes	%	±%
Liberal	Lou Rinaldi	23,415	43.01	+4.67
Progressive Conservative	Rob Milligan	19,528	35.87	-3.93
New Democratic	Kira Mees	9,216	16.93	-0.80
Green	Gudrun Ludorf-Weaver	2,283	4.19	+1.13
Total valid votes		54,442	100.00	
Liberal gain from Progressive Conservative		Swing		+4.30
Source: Elections Ontario
