= Russell Rowe =

Canadian politician

Ontario MPP
- In office 1963–1981
- Preceded by: William Goodfellow
- Succeeded by: Howard Sheppard
- Constituency: Northumberland

Personal details
- Born: December 1, 1914; Campbellford, Ontario, Canada
- Died: September 21, 1994 (aged 79); Cobourg, Ontario, Canada
- Political party: Progressive Conservative
- Spouse: Marjorie Emma
- Children: 6
- Occupation: Teacher

Russell Daniel Rowe (December 1, 1914 – September 21, 1994) was a Canadian politician who served as Speaker of the Legislative Assembly of Ontario from 1974 to 1977.

== Background ==
Born in Campbellford, Ontario, the son of Harold Rowe and Elizabeth Jane Roe, he was educated at Campbellford High School and Queen's University. Rowe served as a pilot in the Royal Canadian Air Force during World War II. After leaving the military he worked as a teacher and stockbroker. He married Marjorie Emma McKeown in 1942 and they had six children. Rowe died at home in Cobourg, Ontario.

== Politics ==
Rowe was elected to the Legislative Assembly of Ontario in the 1963 provincial election as the Progressive Conservative Member of Provincial Parliament (MPP) for Northumberland riding.

He was appointed Deputy Speaker in 1971 by Bill Davis and also chaired the select committee on economic and cultural nationalism in Canada. In 1974, he was appointed Speaker after Allan Reuter was forced to resign due to poor health. It was during Rowe's term that the Speaker was given the added responsibility of administering the staff and operations of the legislative buildings and grounds.

The 1975 provincial election produced Ontario's first minority government in thirty years presenting Rowe with a challenging and rowdy session. He was a popular speaker, however, considered "sweet-tempered" by MPPs on both sides of the House.

Rowe was appointed to a third term as Speaker following the 1977 election (which produced a second minority) but resigned shortly into the session to resume his seat on the backbench. He retired from politics before the 1981 general election. In 1983, he was named to the Liquor Control Board of Ontario.
