= Northumberland (Ontario provincial electoral district) =

Provincial electoral district in Ontario

Ontario electoral district

Defunct provincial electoral district
- Legislature: Legislative Assembly of Ontario
- District created: 1926
- District abolished: 2007
- First contested: 1926
- Last contested: 2003

Northumberland was an electoral riding in Ontario, Canada. It was created in 1926 from the merger of Northumberland East and Northumberland West. It was abolished in 2007 when it was merged into the new riding of Northumberland—Quinte West.

== Members of Provincial Parliament ==
Northumberland
Assembly	Years	Member	Party
Created from Northumberland East and Northumberland West ridings in 1926
17th	1926–1929	William George Robertson	Liberal
18th	1929–1934	Frederick John McArthur	Conservative
19th	1934–1937	Harold Norman Carr	Liberal
20th	1937–1943	Harold Norman Carr	Liberal
21st	1943–1945	Bill Goodfellow	Progressive Conservative
22nd	1945–1948	Bill Goodfellow	Progressive Conservative
23rd	1948–1951	Bill Goodfellow	Progressive Conservative
24th	1951–1955	Bill Goodfellow	Progressive Conservative
25th	1955–1959	Bill Goodfellow	Progressive Conservative
26th	1959–1963	Bill Goodfellow	Progressive Conservative
27th	1963–1967	Russell Rowe	Progressive Conservative
28th	1967–1971	Russell Rowe	Progressive Conservative
29th	1971–1975	Russell Rowe	Progressive Conservative
30th	1975–1977	Russell Rowe	Progressive Conservative
31st	1977–1981	Russell Rowe	Progressive Conservative
32nd	1981–1985	Howard Sheppard	Progressive Conservative
33rd	1985–1987	Howard Sheppard	Progressive Conservative
34th	1987–1990	Joan Fawcett	Liberal
35th	1990–1995	Joan Fawcett	Liberal
36th	1995–1999	Doug Galt	Progressive Conservative
37th	1999–2003	Doug Galt	Progressive Conservative
38th	2003–2007	Lou Rinaldi	Liberal
Sourced from the Ontario Legislative Assembly
Merged into Northumberland—Quinte West before the 2007 election

== Election results ==
2003 Ontario general election
Party	Candidate	Votes	%	±%
Liberal	Lou Rinaldi	20,382	45.05	+1.08
Progressive Conservative	Doug Galt	17,816	39.37	–6.62
New Democratic	Murray Weppler	5,210	11.51	+5.20
Green	Derrick J. Kelly	1,839	4.06	+1.39
Total valid votes		45,247	99.49	
Total rejected, unmarked and declined ballots		231	0.51	–0.17
Turnout		45,478	60.31	–0.88
Eligible voters		75,402		
Liberal gain from Progressive Conservative		Swing		+3.85
Source: Elections Ontario

1999 Ontario general election
Party	Candidate	Votes	%	±%	Expenditures
Progressive Conservative	Doug Galt	20,535	45.99	–6.15	$65,930
Liberal	Carolyn Campbell	19,632	43.97	+8.33	$52,373
New Democratic	Murray Weppler	2,820	6.32	–5.91	$15,249
Green	Tom Lawson	1,194	2.67	–	$4,419
Family Coalition	Jim Psihogios	370	0.83	–	$600
Natural Law	Pascale Levert	99	0.22	–	$0
Total valid votes		44,650	99.33		
Total rejected, unmarked and declined ballots		303	0.67	–0.02	
Turnout		44,953	61.19	–5.94	
Eligible voters		73,464			
Progressive Conservative hold		Swing		–7.24	
Source: Elections Ontario

1995 Ontario general election
Party	Candidate	Votes	%	±%
Progressive Conservative	Doug Galt	19,359	52.14	+21.67
Liberal	Joan Fawcett	13,233	35.64	+2.11
New Democratic	Murray Weppler	4,539	12.22	–14.58
Total valid votes		37,131	99.30	
Total rejected, unmarked and declined ballots		260	0.70	–0.27
Turnout		37,391	67.13	+0.21
Eligible voters		55,696		
Progressive Conservative gain from Liberal		Swing		+9.78
Source: Elections Ontario

1990 Ontario general election
Party	Candidate	Votes	%	±%
Liberal	Joan Fawcett	11,984	33.53	–10.29
Progressive Conservative	Angus Read	10,890	30.47	–9.18
New Democratic	Judi Armstrong	9,581	26.81	+13.55
Confederation of Regions	Doug Young	1,677	4.69	–
Family Coalition	John A. Meiboom	1,213	3.39	+0.86
Libertarian	Stephen R.B. Prust	395	1.11	–
Total valid votes		35,740	99.03	
Total rejected, unmarked and declined ballots		350	0.97	+0.48
Turnout		36,090	66.93	+0.02
Eligible voters		53,924		
Liberal hold		Swing		–0.56
Source: Elections Ontario

1987 Ontario general election
Party	Candidate	Votes	%	±%
Liberal	Joan Fawcett	14,451	43.82	+2.32
Progressive Conservative	Howard Sheppard	13,075	39.65	–8.02
New Democratic	Judi Armstrong	4,372	13.26	+2.43
Family Coalition	Brant Fotheringham	836	2.54	–
Green	Adrian O'Connell	242	0.73	–
Total valid votes		32,976	99.51	
Total rejected ballots		163	0.49	+0.12
Turnout		33,139	66.91	+3.10
Eligible voters		49,528		
Liberal gain from Progressive Conservative		Swing		+5.17
Source: Elections Ontario

1985 Ontario general election
Party	Candidate	Votes	%	±%
Progressive Conservative	Howard Sheppard	14,296	47.67	–3.91
Liberal	Joan Fawcett	12,446	41.50	+2.58
New Democratic	Judi Armstrong	3,247	10.83	+1.33
Total valid votes		29,989	99.63	
Total rejected ballots		111	0.37	+0.09
Turnout		30,100	63.81	–1.14
Eligible voters		47,175		
Progressive Conservative hold		Swing		–3.24
Source: Elections Ontario

1981 Ontario general election
Party	Candidate	Votes	%	±%
Progressive Conservative	Howard Sheppard	14,727	51.58	+3.28
Liberal	William A. Wyatt	11,113	38.92	+3.42
New Democratic	Ben Burd	2,711	9.50	–6.70
Total valid votes		28,551	99.72	
Total rejected ballots		80	0.28	+0.03
Turnout		28,631	64.95	–3.07
Eligible voters		44,084		
Progressive Conservative hold		Swing		–0.07
Source: Elections Ontario

1977 Ontario general election
Party	Candidate	Votes	%	±%
Progressive Conservative	Russell Rowe	14,061	48.30	+3.72
Liberal	Dennis Buckley	10,334	35.50	+0.96
New Democratic	John R. Taylor	4,716	16.20	–4.68
Total valid votes		29,111	99.75	
Total rejected ballots		73	0.25	+0.03
Turnout		29,184	68.01	–4.36
Eligible voters		42,909		
Progressive Conservative hold		Swing		+1.38
Source: Elections Ontario

1975 Ontario general election
Party	Candidate	Votes	%	±%
Progressive Conservative	Russell Rowe	13,328	44.58	–9.85
Liberal	Isobel Kirkpatrick	10,327	34.54	+4.77
New Democratic	John R. Taylor	6,241	20.88	+5.08
Total valid votes		29,896	99.78	
Total rejected ballots		67	0.22	–0.36
Turnout		29,963	72.38	–3.36
Eligible voters		41,399		
Progressive Conservative hold		Swing		–7.31
Source: Elections Ontario

1971 Ontario general election
Party	Candidate	Votes	%	±%
Progressive Conservative	Russell Rowe	12,277	54.43	–3.19
Liberal	Glen Cole	6,717	29.78	–6.70
New Democratic	Art W. Cockerill	3,563	15.80	+9.90
Total valid votes		22,557	99.42	
Total rejected ballots		132	0.58	–0.37
Turnout		22,689	75.74	+2.73
Eligible voters		29,957		
Progressive Conservative hold		Swing		+1.76
Source: Elections Ontario

1967 Ontario general election
Party	Candidate	Votes	%	±%
Progressive Conservative	Russell Rowe	10,411	57.62	+2.50
Liberal	Robin Russell	6,592	36.48	–8.40
New Democratic	Joe Gabovic	1,066	5.90	–
Total valid votes		18,069	99.05	
Total rejected ballots		174	0.95	+0.07
Turnout		18,243	73.01	–3.35
Eligible voters		24,988		
Progressive Conservative hold		Swing		+5.45
Source: Elections Ontario

1963 Ontario general election
Party	Candidate	Votes	%	±%
Progressive Conservative	Russell Rowe	10,219	55.12	–3.17
Liberal	Jack A. Heenan	8,322	44.88	+5.47
Total valid votes		18,541	99.12	
Total rejected ballots		165	0.88	–0.08
Turnout		18,706	76.36	–2.96
Eligible voters		24,497		
Progressive Conservative hold		Swing		–4.32
Source: Elections Ontario

1959 Ontario general election
Party	Candidate	Votes	%	±%
Progressive Conservative	Bill Goodfellow	10,322	58.28	–4.91
Liberal	Colin Crews	6,981	39.42	+5.76
Co-operative Commonwealth	Norman Farthing	407	2.30	–0.84
Total valid votes		17,710	99.04	
Total rejected ballots		172	0.96	+0.16
Turnout		17,882	79.32	+4.21
Eligible voters		22,543		
Progressive Conservative hold		Swing		–5.34
Source: Elections Ontario

1955 Ontario general election
Party	Candidate	Votes	%	±%
Progressive Conservative	Bill Goodfellow	10,200	63.20	+0.76
Liberal	Jack Price	5,433	33.66	–3.90
Co-operative Commonwealth	Franklin Raymond Armstrong	507	3.14	–
Total valid votes		16,140	99.19	
Total rejected ballots		131	0.81	+0.22
Turnout		16,271	75.12	–3.14
Eligible voters		21,661		
Progressive Conservative hold		Swing		+2.33
Source: Elections Ontario

1951 Ontario general election
Party	Candidate	Votes	%	±%
Progressive Conservative	Bill Goodfellow	10,140	62.43	+6.56
Liberal	Charles E. Johnston	6,101	37.57	+2.05
Total valid votes		16,241	99.41	
Total rejected ballots		96	0.59	+0.17
Turnout		16,337	78.25	+7.31
Eligible voters		20,877		
Progressive Conservative hold		Swing		+2.25
Source: Elections Ontario

1948 Ontario general election
Party	Candidate	Votes	%	±%
Progressive Conservative	Bill Goodfellow	8,361	55.88	+0.18
Liberal	Leonard C. Gordon	5,314	35.51	–1.49
Co-operative Commonwealth	Harold Wesley Pierce	1,288	8.61	+1.32
Total valid votes		14,963	99.58	
Total rejected ballots		63	0.42	–0.14
Turnout		15,026	70.94	–5.09
Eligible voters		21,181		
Progressive Conservative hold		Swing		+0.83
Source: Elections Ontario

1945 Ontario general election
Party	Candidate	Votes	%	±%
Progressive Conservative	Bill Goodfellow	8,674	55.70	+2.25
Liberal	Charles Quinn	5,763	37.01	–1.04
Co-operative Commonwealth	Frederick Hempstead	1,135	7.29	–1.21
Total valid votes		15,572	99.44	
Total rejected ballots		87	0.56	–0.08
Turnout		15,659	76.03	+7.66
Eligible voters		20,595		
Progressive Conservative hold		Swing		+1.64
Source: Elections Ontario

1943 Ontario general election
Party	Candidate	Votes	%	±%
Progressive Conservative	Bill Goodfellow	7,412	53.45	+5.28
Liberal	John Callahan	5,276	38.05	–13.78
Co-operative Commonwealth	W.J. Harold Dunk	1,178	8.50	–
Total valid votes		13,866	99.36	
Total rejected ballots		89	0.64	+0.09
Turnout		13,955	68.37	–14.18
Eligible voters		20,410		
Progressive Conservative gain from Liberal		Swing		+9.53
Source: Elections Ontario

1937 Ontario general election
Party	Candidate	Votes	%	±%
Liberal	Harold Norman Carr	8,873	51.83	–0.71
Conservative	Roy Willmott	8,248	48.17	+0.71
Total valid votes		17,121	99.45	
Total rejected ballots		94	0.55	–0.05
Turnout		17,215	82.55	–0.65
Eligible voters		20,854		
Liberal hold		Swing		–0.71
Source: Elections Ontario

1934 Ontario general election
Party	Candidate	Votes	%	±%
Liberal	Harold Norman Carr	9,087	52.53	+5.06
Conservative	Frederick John McArthur	8,211	47.47	–5.06
Total valid votes		17,298	99.41	
Total rejected ballots		103	0.59	–0.03
Turnout		17,401	83.20	+13.11
Eligible voters		20,914		
Liberal gain from Conservative		Swing		+5.06
Source: Elections Ontario

1929 Ontario general election
Party	Candidate	Votes	%	±%
Conservative	Frederick John McArthur	7,108	52.52	+5.98
Liberal	William George Robertson	6,425	47.48	–5.98
Total valid votes		13,533	99.38	
Total rejected ballots		84	0.62	+0.18
Turnout		13,617	70.09	–2.18
Eligible voters		19,428		
Conservative gain from Liberal		Swing		+5.98
Source: Elections Ontario

1926 Ontario general election
Party	Candidate	Votes	%
Liberal	William George Robertson	7,612	53.46
Conservative	Frederick John McArthur	6,627	46.54
Total valid votes		14,239	99.57
Total rejected ballots		62	0.43
Turnout		14,301	72.27
Eligible voters		19,788	
Liberal pickup new district.			
Source: Elections Ontario
