= David Piccini =

Canadian politician

The Honourable David Piccini ECO MPP
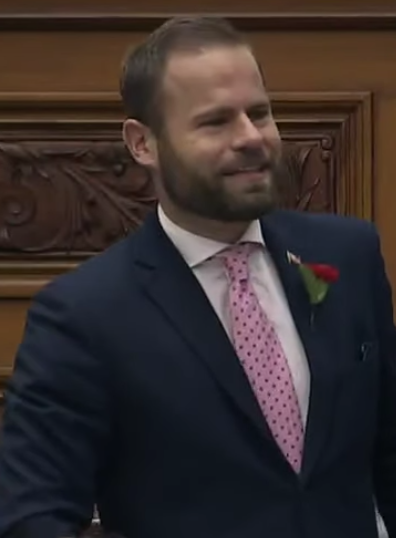
- Piccini in 2019

Ontario Minister of Infrastructure
- Incumbent
- Assumed office September 10, 2026
- Premier: Doug Ford
- Preceded by: Kinga Surma

Ontario Minister of Labour, Immigration, Training and Skills Development
- In office June 18, 2021 – September 10, 2026
- Premier: Doug Ford
- Preceded by: Jeff Yurek
- Succeeded by: Trevor Jones

Parliamentary Assistant to the Minister of Training, Colleges and Universities
- In office June 26, 2018 – June 18, 2021
- Minister: Merrilee Fullerton; Ross Romano

Member of the Ontario Provincial Parliament for Northumberland—Peterborough South
- Incumbent
- Assumed office June 7, 2018
- Preceded by: Riding established

Personal details
- Born: David Winsor Piccini; September 29, 1988 (age 38) Toronto, Ontario, Canada
- Party: Progressive Conservative
- Spouse: Faith Chipman
- Occupation: Politician

David Winsor Piccini ECO MPP (born September 29, 1988) is a Canadian politician who has been the Ontario minister of infrastructure since September 2026. He was previously Ontario minister of labour, immigration, training and skills development from 2023 to 2026. He was first elected to the Legislative Assembly of Ontario in the 2018 provincial election and represents Northumberland—Peterborough South as a member of the Progressive Conservative Party of Ontario.

== Early life ==
Piccini was raised in Port Hope, Ontario. He studied at the University of Ottawa, where he played for the Ottawa Gee-Gees men's soccer team. He later coached that same team.

== Career ==
=== Early career ===
Piccini was employed supporting the international work of the Royal College of Physicians and Surgeons of Canada from 2015. In 2018, he helped found the Canadian International Health Education Association, leading one of Canada's largest healthcare missions to the Gulf region.

In 2015, Piccini ran in Ottawa-Vanier for the Conservative Party of Canada, but finished third.

=== Legislative Assembly of Ontario; Minister of the Environment ===
Piccini was first elected to the Legislative Assembly of Ontario in the 2018 provincial election. He represents the riding of Northumberland—Peterborough South as a member of the Progressive Conservative Party of Ontario.

After he was elected, Piccini served from 2018-21 as a member of the Standing Committee on Finance and Economic Affairs, served from 2018-19 as the Parliamentary Assistant to the Minister of Colleges and Universities, and served from 2021-23 as the youngest-ever (at 33 years of age) Ontario Minister of the Environment, Conservation and Parks.

=== Minister of Labour, Immigration, Training and Skills Development ===
Piccini became Ontario's Minister of Labour, Immigration, Training & Skills Development on September 22, 2023.

On November 14, 2023, Piccini introduced Ontario's Working for Workers Four Act, his first as Minister of Labour, Immigration, Training and Skills Development. The bill, which lowered the employment period needed by firefighters and fire investigators to be eligible to receive compensation when diagnosed with esophageal cancer from 25 to 15 years, received Royal Assent on March 21, 2024. The legislation also made changes to the Employment Standards Act (ESA), these included prohibiting employers from deducting wages for stolen property or unpaid bills, and mandating payment for trial shifts. The changes also required transparency in tip-sharing practices and salary disclosures in job postings, banned the use of Canadian work experience as a job application requirement, improved oversight of third-party assessments for international qualifications, clarified vacation pay provisions, and allowed inflation-adjusted increases to Workplace Safety and Insurance Board benefits.

In August 2024, he confronted Fred Hahn, the President of CUPE Ontario, and told Hahn "you have to stop hating Jews." Piccini was praised for that by, among others, former Conservative leader Erin O'Toole, psychologist and author Jordan Peterson, and Conservative MPs Michelle Rempel Garner and Melissa Lantsman.

=== Skills Development Fund ===
In October 2025, the Auditor General of Ontario, Shelley Spence, released an audit of the province's Skills Development Fund (SDF). The audit concluded that although the application and selection processes complied with provincial policies and program guidelines, the selection process was "not fair, transparent or accountable". The auditor found that unlike similar funds in Alberta, British Columbia, Manitoba, and Newfoundland and Labrador, Piccini's office was heavily involved in specific funding decisions. Ministry staff evaluated and ranked applications before the minister's office selected projects for funding. Of the applications selected during the first five rounds, 549, or 54 per cent, had been ranked "Poor", "Low" or "Medium" by ministry staff. They received approximately $742 million, representing 56 per cent of the funding awarded during those rounds. The audit also identified 670 applications ranked "High" that were not selected. The Auditor General found that 64 low- and medium-ranked applications selected for funding had retained registered lobbyists to lobby the ministry or minister before their selection; those applicants received approximately $126 million. Following the report, Ontario's three opposition parties called for Piccini's resignation, while Piccini defended the fund, saying that it had helped thousands of people find employment. That month, The Trillium reported that Piccini had attended the wedding of Michael Rudderham, a longtime friend and registered lobbyist. Two of Rudderham's clients, Keel Digital Solutions and LifeLabs, had received more than $8.5 million in SDF grants. In December 2025, Ontario Integrity Commissioner Cathryn Motherwell opened an investigation into Piccini's involvement in the SDF following separate requests from NDP leader Marit Stiles and Liberal MPP Stephanie Smyth. The complaints alleged possible violations of provisions of the Members' Integrity Act concerning conflicts of interest, influence, gifts and other matters. In September 2026, Piccini was moved from Ministry of Labour to Minister of Infrastructure while investigations remain ongoing.

== Electoral record ==
2022 Ontario general election: Northumberland—Peterborough South
Party	Candidate	Votes	%	±%
Progressive Conservative	David Piccini	26,419	50.93	+5.61
Liberal	Jeff Kawzenuk	12,936	24.94	+0.77
New Democratic	Kim McArthur-Jackson	6,806	13.12	−11.38
Green	Lisa Francis	2,942	5.67	+1.14
Ontario Party	Vanessa Head	1,598	3.08	
New Blue	Joshua Chalhoub	1,170	2.26	
Total valid votes		51,871	100.0	
Total rejected, unmarked, and declined ballots		258		
Progressive Conservative hold		Swing		▲2.42
Source(s): "Summary of Valid Votes Cast for Each Candidate" (PDF). Elections Ontario. 2022. Archived from the original on May 18, 2023.; "Statistical Summary by Electoral District" (PDF). Elections Ontario. 2022. Archived from the original on May 21, 2023.

2018 Ontario general election: Northumberland—Peterborough South
Party	Candidate	Votes	%	±%
Progressive Conservative	David Piccini	27,386	45.32	+9.78
New Democratic	Jana Papuckoski	14,804	24.50	+6.03
Liberal	Lou Rinaldi	14,603	24.17	-17.35
Green	Jeff Wheeldon	2,740	4.53	+0.27
Libertarian	John O'Keefe	425	0.70	
Trillium	Derek Sharp	278	0.46	
Stop Climate Change	Paul Cragg	187	0.31	
Total valid votes		60,423	100.0	
Progressive Conservative notional gain from Liberal		Swing		▲1.88
Source: Elections Ontario

2015 Canadian federal election
Party	Candidate	Votes	%	±%	Expenditures
Liberal	Mauril Bélanger	36,474	57.57	+19.47	$163,698.89
New Democratic	Emilie Taman	12,194	19.25	-9.43	$123,293.39
Conservative	David Piccini	12,109	19.11	-8.84	$74,698.91
Green	Nira Dookeran	1,947	3.07	-1.99	$8,775.54
Libertarian	Coreen Corcoran	503	0.79	–	$747.12
Marxist–Leninist	Christian Legeais	128	0.2	-0.03	–
Total valid votes/Expense limit		63,355	100.0		$219,479.72
Total rejected ballots		418	–	–	
Turnout		63,773	–	–	
Eligible voters		83,570			
Source: Elections Canada
