= Harold Norman Carr =

Canadian politician

Ontario MPP
- In office 1934–1943
- Preceded by: Frederick John McArthur
- Succeeded by: Bill Goodfellow
- Constituency: Northumberland

Personal details
- Born: October 7, 1887 Toronto, Ontario
- Died: February 20, 1974 (aged 86) Toronto, Ontario
- Party: Liberal
- Spouse: Agnes Jane Mills (m. 1907)
- Occupation: Businessman

Harold Norman Carr (October 7, 1887 – February 20, 1974) was a business owner and politician in Ontario, Canada. He represented Northumberland in the Legislative Assembly of Ontario from 1934 to 1943 as a Liberal.

The son of James Carr and Vesta Ward, he was born in Toronto and was educated there. In 1907, he married the daughter of David Mills. He served on Campbellford town council and was mayor from 1932 to 1934. Carr operated the Trent Valley Creamery.
