= Doug Galt =

Canadian politician

The Honourable Doug Galt ECO

Ontario MPP
- In office 1995–2003
- Preceded by: Joan Fawcett
- Succeeded by: Lou Rinaldi
- Constituency: Northumberland

Personal details
- Born: 1937 or 1938 (age 87–88)
- Party: Progressive Conservative
- Spouse: Catherine
- Occupation: Veterinarian

Doug Galt (born 1938) is a former politician in Ontario, Canada. He was a Progressive Conservative member of the Legislative Assembly of Ontario from 1995 to 2003, and an unsuccessful contender for the House of Commons of Canada in 2004.

== Background ==
Galt was a veterinarian before entering political life. He was an overseas veterinary pathologist and project coordinator for CIDA in 1988 and 1992, and retired as head of the Brighton Veterinary Services Lab in 1994. In the late 1980s, he attended Queen's University and earned a Master's Degree in public administration. Galt currently lives in the hamlet of Salem, Ontario with his wife Catherine.

== Politics ==
He began his political career at the municipal level, serving as a warden in Northumberland County, and as reeve of Cramahe Township. Galt was also a school trustee, and chaired the Colborne-Cramahe Community Economic Development Commission in 1994.

Galt was elected to the Ontario legislature in the 1995 provincial election, defeating incumbent Liberal Joan Fawcett by over 6,000 votes in the Northumberland riding. The Progressive Conservatives won the election under the leadership of Mike Harris, and Galt sat as a backbench supporter. He became known for asking "softball" questions (i.e. inoffensive questions which praise the sitting government, and allow ministers to outline new policy initiatives).

Galt was re-elected in the 1999 provincial election, though by only 903 votes over Liberal Carolyn Campbell. He introduced a resolution in the Legislature to bring forward greater protection against cruelty to animals and tried to ban riding in the back of pick-up trucks. Galt also introduced a Private Member's Bill to create a Robert Baldwin Day in Ontario which was later endorsed by Andrew Redden in an article published in the Canadian Parliamentary Review. In 2000, Galt precipitated a minor crisis in the legislature by accidentally reading out the names of certain young offenders, whose identities were protected by law. Galt was actually praising the young offenders for graduating from a young offenders program while forgetting that they were still young offenders. Rob Sampson, the Minister of Correctional Services, had to temporarily resign from office to show ministerial accountability for Galt's error.

Galt served as chair of the Premier's Task Force on Rural Economic Renewal, which toured the province and consulted with other jurisdictions. Amongst other initiatives, the findings of this Task Force led to the creation of the O.S.T.A.R. program and Rural Economic Development funding initiative.

Galt supported Ernie Eves to replace Harris as party leader in 2002, and was named by Eves as a minister without portfolio and chief government Whip on August 22 of that year.

The Progressive Conservatives were defeated in the 2003 provincial election, and Galt lost his seat to Liberal candidate Lou Rinaldi by approximately 2,500 votes.

=== Federal politics ===
In early 2004, Galt supported Tony Clement's unsuccessful campaign to become leader of the Conservative Party of Canada.

Galt himself ran as a Conservative in the 2004 federal election, challenging Liberal incumbent Paul Macklin in the federal riding of Northumberland. Macklin defeated Galt by 313 votes.

== Electoral record ==
1995 Ontario general election
Party	Candidate	Votes	%	±%
Progressive Conservative	Doug Galt	19,359	52.13	
Liberal	Joan Fawcett	13,233	35.63	
New Democratic	Murray Weppler	4,539	12.22	

1999 Ontario general election: Northumberland
Party	Candidate	Votes	%	±%	Expenditures
Progressive Conservative	Doug Galt	20,535	45.99	.	$65,930
Liberal	Carolyn Campbell	19,632	43.97	.	$52,373
New Democratic	Murray Weppler	2,820	6.32	.	$15,249
Green	Tom Lawson	1,194	2.67	.	$4,419
Family Coalition	Jim Psihogios	370	0.83	.	$600
Natural Law	Pascale Levert	99	0.22	.	$0
Total valid votes		44,650	100.00		
Rejected, unmarked and declined ballots		303			
Turnout		44,953	61.19		
Electors on the lists		73,464			
Sources: Official Results, Elections Ontario and 1999 Annual and Election Returns, Elections Ontario.

2003 Ontario general election
Party	Candidate	Votes	%	±%
Liberal	Lou Rinaldi	20,382	45.05	+1.08
Progressive Conservative	Doug Galt	17,816	39.37	-6.62
New Democratic	Murray Weppler	5,210	11.51	+5.19
Green	Derrick J. Kelly	1,839	4.06	+1.39

2004 Canadian federal election: Northumberland—Quinte West (federal electoral district)
Party	Candidate	Votes	%
Liberal	Paul Macklin	22,989	39.85
Conservative	Doug Galt	22,676	39.31
New Democratic	Russ Christianson	9,007	15.61
Green	Steven Haylestrom	3,016	5.23
Total valid votes		57,688	100.00

Eves ministry, Province of Ontario (2002–2003)
Sub-Cabinet Post
Predecessor	Title	Successor
	Minister without Portfolio (2002-2003)	
Special Parliamentary Responsibilities
Predecessor	Title	Successor
John Baird	Chief Government Whip; 2002-2003	Dave Levac
