= Joan Fawcett =

Canadian politician

Ontario MPP
- In office 1987–1995
- Preceded by: Howard Sheppard
- Succeeded by: Doug Galt
- Constituency: Northumberland

Personal details
- Born: April 19, 1937; Kingston, Ontario, Canada
- Died: August 15, 2015 (aged 78); Cobourg, Ontario
- Political party: Liberal
- Spouse: Robert Fawcett (1930-2011; his death)
- Children: 3
- Occupation: Teacher

Joan Mary Fawcett (April 19, 1937 – August 16, 2015) was a politician in Ontario, Canada. She served as a Liberal member of the Legislative Assembly of Ontario from 1987 to 1995 who represented the eastern Ontario riding of Northumberland.

== Background ==
Fawcett was educated at Ottawa Teachers' College and Queen's University in Kingston. She worked as a teacher after her graduation. She and her husband Robert raised three children.

== Politics ==
Fawcett served as reeve of Colborne, Northumberland County, Ontario, before her provincial career.

She ran for the Ontario legislature in the 1985 provincial election, but lost to Progressive Conservative Howard Sheppard by fewer than 2000 votes in the rural, eastern-Ontario riding of Northumberland. She ran again in the 1987 provincial election, and defeated Sheppard by 1376 votes amid a landslide majority victory for the Liberals under David Peterson.

Fawcett was appointed Deputy Government Whip, served as chair of the Liberal rural caucus from 1988 to 1990, and was appointed as parliamentary assistant to the Minister of Skills Development in 1989.

The Liberals were defeated by the New Democratic Party in the 1990 provincial election. Although the Liberals lost many of their marginal seats in this election, Fawcett was re-elected over Progressive Conservative candidate Angus Read by 1094 votes; the NDP candidate was a close third. Fawcett served as her party's caucus chair from 1990 to 1992, and held a variety of critic positions.

The Progressive Conservatives won a majority government in the 1995 provincial election, and Fawcett lost the Northumberland riding to Progressive Conservative Doug Galt by over 6000 votes.

Fawcett retired from politics and moved to Howe Island with her husband and died in Cobourg, Ontario, on August 16, 2015, at Northumberland Hills Hospital at the age of 78 from a massive stroke. She was survived by her three children and a sister, as well as extended family.
