= Northumberland—Quinte West (provincial electoral district) =

Coordinates: 44.07°N 77.79°W

Ontario electoral district
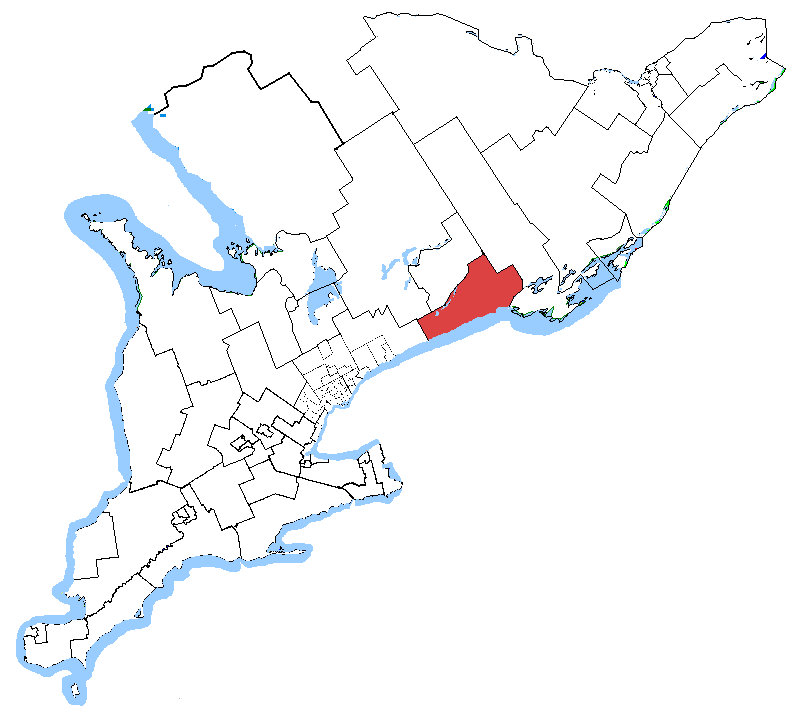
- Northumberland—Quinte West in relation to southern Ontario ridings

Defunct provincial electoral district
- Legislature: Legislative Assembly of Ontario
- District created: 2006
- District abolished: 2018
- First contested: 2007
- Last contested: 2014

Demographics
- Population (2006): 123,706
- Electors (2011): 93,620
- Area (km²): 2,652
- Census division: Durham
- Census subdivision(s): Quinte West, Northumberland

Northumberland—Quinte West was a provincial electoral district in Ontario, Canada, that was represented in the Legislative Assembly of Ontario between the 2007 provincial election and the 2018 provincial election. Its population in 2001 was 118,906.

== Geography ==
The district includes the County of Northumberland and the City of Quinte West.

== History ==
The electoral district was created in 2003: 86.1% of the riding came from Northumberland riding and 13.9% from Prince Edward—Hastings riding. In 2018, the riding was dissolved into Northumberland—Peterborough South and Bay of Quinte.

== Members of Provincial Parliament ==
Northumberland—Quinte West
Assembly	Years	Member	Party
Riding created from Northumberland and Prince Edward—Hastings
39th	2007–2011	Lou Rinaldi	Liberal
40th	2011–2014	Rob Milligan	Progressive Conservative
41st	2014–2018	Lou Rinaldi	Liberal
Riding dissolved into Northumberland—Peterborough South and Bay of Quinte

== Election results ==
2014 Ontario general election
Party	Candidate	Votes	%	±%
Liberal	Lou Rinaldi	23,419	42.97	+4.63
Progressive Conservative	Rob Milligan	19,583	35.93	–3.87
New Democratic	Kira Mees	9,211	16.90	–0.83
Green	Gudrun Ludorf-Weaver	2,283	4.19	+1.13
Total valid votes		54,496	98.68	
Total rejected, unmarked and declined ballots		730	1.32	+0.95
Turnout		55,226	55.81	+3.94
Eligible voters		98,945		
Liberal gain from Progressive Conservative		Swing		+4.25
Source: Elections Ontario

2011 Ontario general election
Party	Candidate	Votes	%	±%
Progressive Conservative	Rob Milligan	19,279	39.80	+8.59
Liberal	Lou Rinaldi	18,572	38.34	–7.03
New Democratic	Kira Mees	8,589	17.73	+4.52
Green	Judy Smith Torrie	1,483	3.06	–7.14
Libertarian	Jeffrey McLarty	357	0.74	–
Independent	Richard Martin Rieger	159	0.33	–
Total valid votes		48,439	99.63	
Total rejected, unmarked and declined ballots		182	0.37	–0.17
Turnout		48,621	51.88	–3.04
Eligible voters		93,720		
Progressive Conservative gain from Liberal		Swing		+7.81
Source: Elections Ontario

2007 Ontario general election
Party	Candidate	Votes	%	±%
Liberal	Lou Rinaldi	22,287	45.37	–
Progressive Conservative	Cathy Galt	15,330	31.21	–
New Democratic	Carolyn Blaind	6,492	13.22	–
Green	Judy Smith Torrie	5,012	10.20	–
Total valid votes		49,121	99.46	
Total rejected, unmarked and declined ballots		269	0.54	–
Turnout		49,390	54.92	–
Eligible voters		89,930		
Liberal pickup new district.				
Source: Elections Ontario

== 2007 electoral reform referendum ==
2007 Ontario electoral reform referendum
Side	Votes	%
First Past the Post	32,392	67.2
Mixed member proportional	15,834	32.8
Total valid votes	48,226	100.0

== Sources ==
- Elections Ontario 2011 Candidates Northumberland--Quinte West
- Elections Ontario Past Election Results
