= Northumberland—Peterborough South (provincial electoral district) =

Provincial electoral district in Ontario, Canada

Coordinates: 44.16°N 78.11°W

Ontario electoral district
- Northumberland-Peterborough South in relation to other electoral districts in Southern Ontario

Provincial electoral district
- Legislature: Legislative Assembly of Ontario
MPP
David Piccini
Progressive Conservative
- District created: 2015
- First contested: 2018
- Last contested: 2025

Demographics
- Population (2016): 112,415
- Electors (2018): 94,504
- Area (km²): 2,903
- Pop. density (per km²): 38.7
- Census division(s): Durham, Northumberland, Peterborough County
- Census subdivision(s): Alnwick/Haldimand, Brighton, Clarington, Cobourg, Cramahe, Hamilton Township, Otonabee–South Monaghan, Peterborough, Port Hope, Trent Hills

Northumberland—Peterborough South is a provincial electoral district in Ontario, Canada. It elects one member to the Legislative Assembly of Ontario. The riding was created in 2015.

== Members of Provincial Parliament ==
Northumberland—Peterborough South
Assembly	Years	Member	Party
Riding created from Northumberland—Quinte West, Durham, and Prince Edward—Hastings
42nd	2018–2022	David Piccini	Progressive Conservative
43rd	2022–2025	David Piccini	Progressive Conservative
44th	2025–present	David Piccini	Progressive Conservative

== Election results ==
Winning party in each polling division of Northumberland—Peterborough South at the 2025 Ontario general election

2025 Ontario general election
Party	Candidate	Votes	%	±%
Progressive Conservative	David Piccini	28,502	52.11	+1.18
Liberal	Dorothy Noronha	17,705	32.37	+7.43
New Democratic	Bruce Lepage	5,097	9.32	–3.80
Green	Maxwell Groves	1,998	3.65	–2.02
New Blue	Joshua Chalhoub	717	1.31	–0.95
Ontario Party	Florian Bors	673	1.23	–1.85
Total valid votes/expense limit		54,692	99.23	–0.28
Total rejected, unmarked, and declined ballots		427	0.77	+0.28
Turnout		55,119	53.28	+1.56
Eligible voters		103,449		
Progressive Conservative hold		Swing		–3.13
Source: Elections Ontario

Winning party in each polling division of Northumberland—Peterborough South at the 2022 Ontario general election

2022 Ontario general election
Party	Candidate	Votes	%	±%
Progressive Conservative	David Piccini	26,419	50.93	+5.61
Liberal	Jeff Kawzenuk	12,936	24.94	+0.77
New Democratic	Kim McArthur-Jackson	6,806	13.12	−11.38
Green	Lisa Francis	2,942	5.67	+1.14
Ontario Party	Vanessa Head	1,598	3.08	
New Blue	Joshua Chalhoub	1,170	2.26	
Total valid votes		51,871	100.0	
Total rejected, unmarked, and declined ballots		258		
Turnout		52,129	51.72	
Eligible voters		99,034		
Progressive Conservative hold		Swing		+2.42
Source(s): "Summary of Valid Votes Cast for Each Candidate" (PDF). Elections Ontario. 2022. Archived from the original on 18 May 2023.; "Statistical Summary by Electoral District" (PDF). Elections Ontario. 2022. Archived from the original on 21 May 2023.

2018 Ontario general election
Party	Candidate	Votes	%	±%
Progressive Conservative	David Piccini	27,386	45.32	+9.78
New Democratic	Jana Papuckoski	14,804	24.50	+6.03
Liberal	Lou Rinaldi	14,603	24.17	-17.35
Green	Jeff Wheeldon	2,740	4.53	+0.27
Libertarian	John O'Keefe	425	0.70	
Trillium	Derek Sharp	278	0.46	
Stop Climate Change	Paul Cragg	187	0.31	
Total valid votes		60,423	100.0	
Progressive Conservative notional gain from Liberal		Swing		+1.88
Source: Elections Ontario

2014 general election redistributed results
Party	Vote	%
Liberal	20,584	41.52
Progressive Conservative	17,616	35.54
New Democratic	9,156	18.47
Green	2,112	4.26
Others	103	0.21

== See also ==
- List of Ontario provincial electoral districts
- Canadian provincial electoral districts
