= Lou Rinaldi (politician) =

Canadian politician

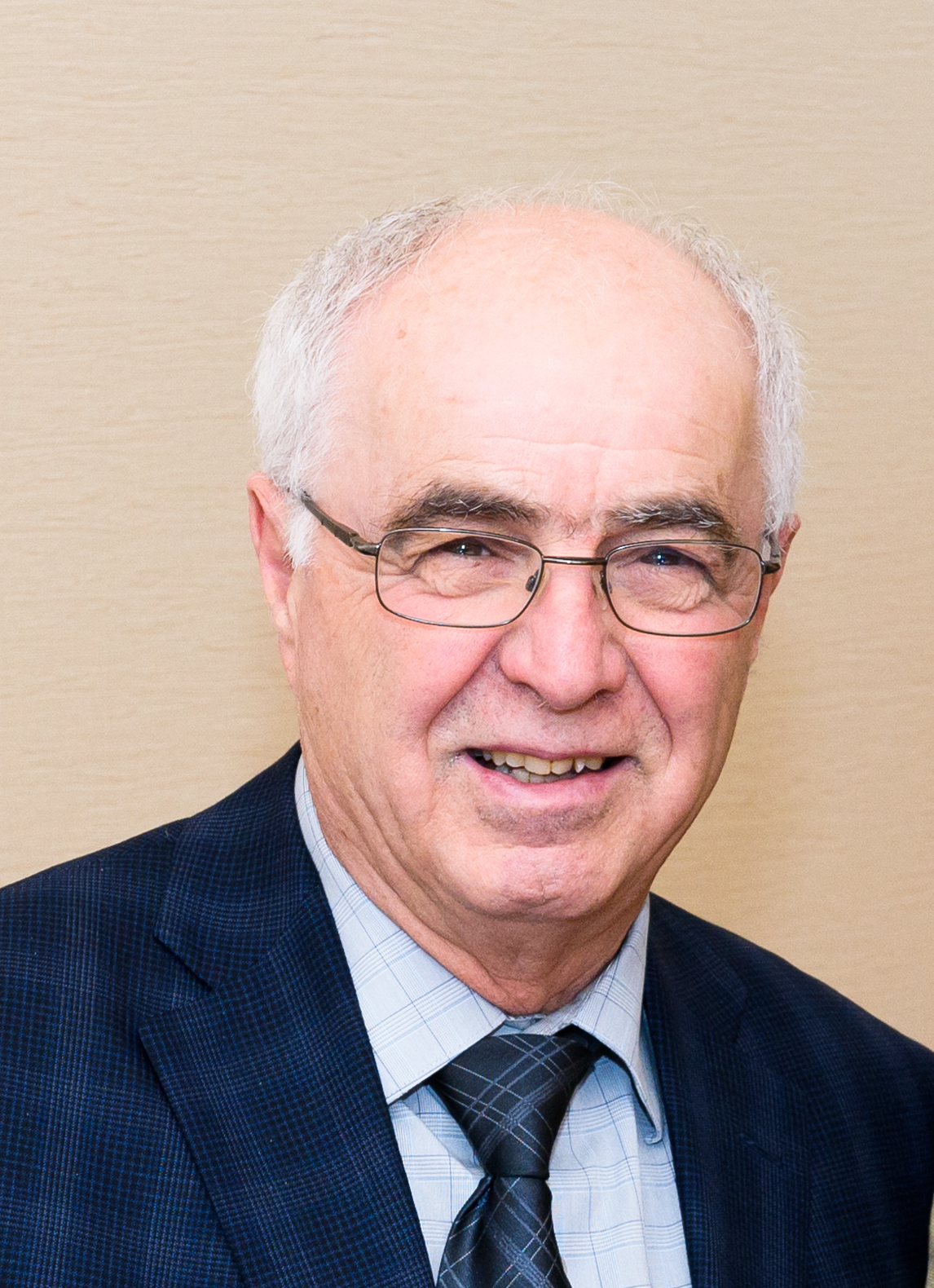
- Rinaldi in 2017

Ontario MPP
- In office 2014–2018
- Preceded by: Rob Milligan
- Succeeded by: Riding abolished
- In office 2003–2011
- Preceded by: Doug Galt
- Succeeded by: Rob Milligan
- Constituency: Northumberland—Quinte West; Northumberland (2003-2007)

Personal details
- Born: 1947 (age 78–79) Patrica, Italy
- Party: Liberal
- Occupation: Businessman

Luigino Rinaldi (born c. 1947) is a former politician in Ontario, Canada. He was a Liberal member of the Legislative Assembly of Ontario from 2003 to 2011 and again from 2014 to 2018, who represented the ridings of Northumberland and Northumberland—Quinte West.

== Background ==
Rinaldi moved to Canada with his family in 1960. He received an automotive technology diploma from George Brown College and started a small business in the automotive field in 1972. He moved to Brighton, Ontario in 1980, having purchased Brighton Speedway, a family entertainment venue.

== Politics ==
Rinaldi was appointed to the council in the former Brighton township in 1992. He subsequently won election to the same position. He was elected as deputy reeve and was appointed reeve of the township in 1998. In 2000, he was elected mayor of the newly amalgamated municipality of Brighton. As mayor, he presided over the establishment of the Brighton Health Services Centre in the community.

In the provincial election of 2003, Rinaldi defeated incumbent Progressive Conservative Doug Galt by about 2500 votes to become the new Member of Provincial Parliament (MPP) for Northumberland. The Liberals won the election, and Rinaldi was named Parliamentary Assistant (PA) to David Caplan, the Minister of Infrastructure, on October 23, 2003. He was re-elected in the provincial election of 2007 in the newly redistributed riding of Northumberland—Quinte West. He was appointed as PA to the Minister of Municipal Affairs and Housing.

In the provincial election of 2011 he was defeated by Progressive Conservative candidate Rob Milligan. In 2014, Rinaldi competed against Milligan again, this time defeating him by 3,887 votes.

In July 2014, he was reappointed as Parliamentary Assistant to the Minister of Municipal Affairs and Housing.

== Electoral record ==
2018 Ontario general election: Northumberland—Peterborough South
Party	Candidate	Votes	%	±%
Progressive Conservative	David Piccini	27,386	45.32	+9.78
New Democratic	Jana Papuckoski	14,804	24.50	+6.03
Liberal	Lou Rinaldi	14,603	24.17	-17.35
Green	Jeff Wheeldon	2,740	4.53	+0.27
Libertarian	John O'Keefe	425	0.70	
Trillium	Derek Sharp	278	0.46	
Stop Climate Change	Paul Cragg	187	0.31	
Total valid votes		60,423	100.0	
Progressive Conservative notional gain from Liberal		Swing		+1.88
Source: Elections Ontario

2014 Ontario general election: Northumberland—Quinte West
Party	Candidate	Votes	%	±%
Liberal	Lou Rinaldi	23,415	43.01	+4.67
Progressive Conservative	Rob Milligan	19,528	35.87	-3.93
New Democratic	Kira Mees	9,216	16.93	-0.80
Green	Gudrun Ludorf-Weaver	2,283	4.19	+1.13
Total valid votes		54,442	100.00	
Liberal gain from Progressive Conservative		Swing		+4.30
Source: Elections Ontario

2011 Ontario general election: Northumberland—Quinte West
Party	Candidate	Votes	%	±%
Progressive Conservative	Rob Milligan	19,279	39.80	+8.59
Liberal	Lou Rinaldi	18,572	38.34	-7.03
New Democratic	Kira Mees	8,589	17.73	+4.52
Green	Judy Smith Torrie	1,483	3.06	-7.14
Libertarian	Jeffrey McLarty	357	0.74	
Independent	Richard Martin Rieger	159	0.33	
Total valid votes		48,439	100.00	
Total rejected, unmarked and declined ballots		182	0.37	
Turnout		48,621	51.88	
Eligible voters		93,720		
Progressive Conservative gain from Liberal		Swing		+7.81
Source: Elections Ontario

2007 Ontario general election
Party	Candidate	Votes	%	±%
Liberal	Lou Rinaldi	22,288	45.4	
Progressive Conservative	Cathy Galt	15,328	31.2	
New Democratic	Carolyn Blaind	6,481	13.2	
Green	Judy Smith Torrie	5,020	10.2	

2003 Ontario general election
Party	Candidate	Votes	%	±%
Liberal	Lou Rinaldi	20,382	45.05	+1.08
Progressive Conservative	Doug Galt	17,816	39.37	-6.62
New Democratic	Murray Weppler	5,210	11.51	+5.19
Green	Derrick J. Kelly	1,839	4.06	+1.39
