= Adil Shamji =

Canadian politician

Adil Shamji MPP
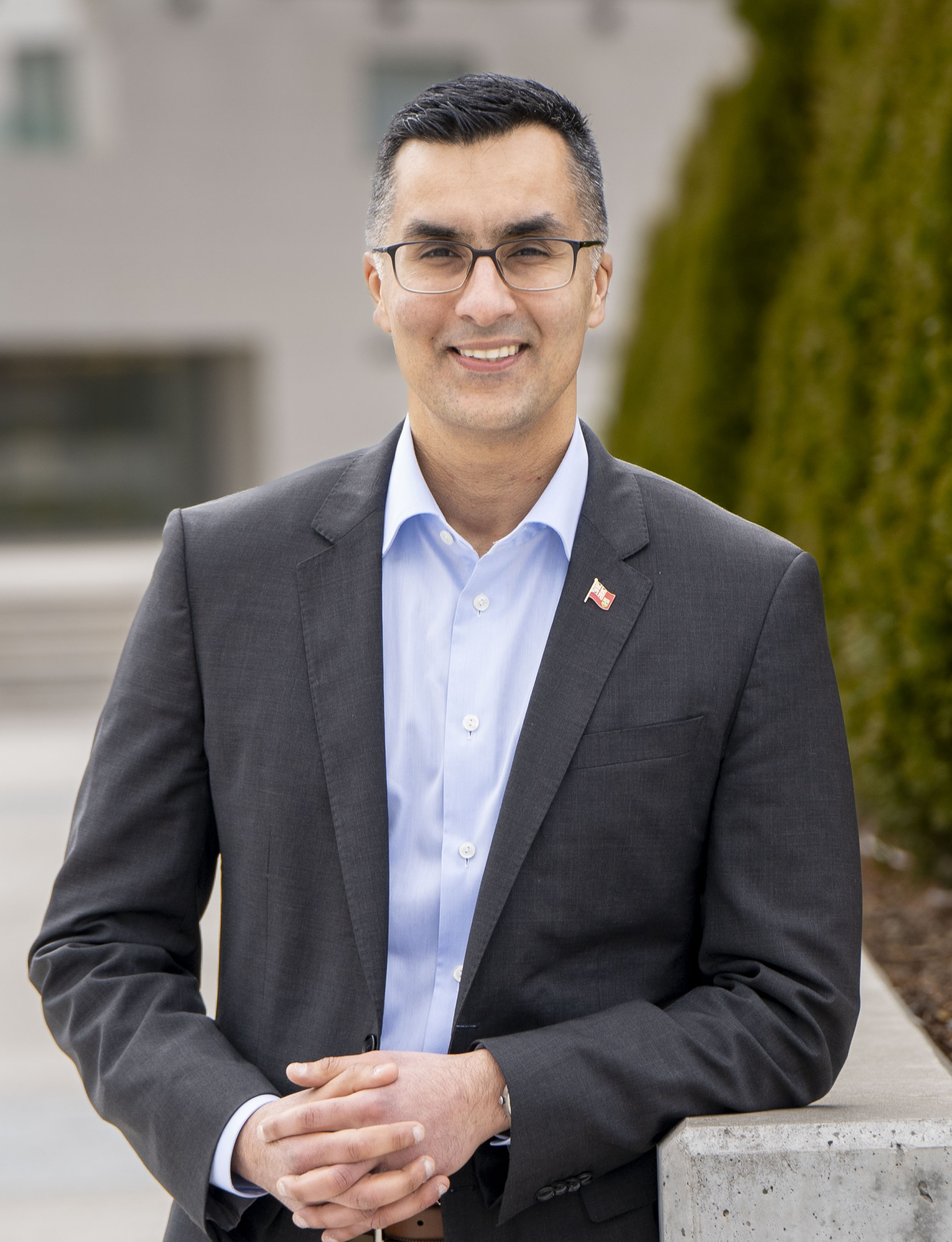
- Shamji in 2024

Member of the Ontario Provincial Parliament for Don Valley East
- Incumbent
- Assumed office June 2, 2022
- Preceded by: Michael Coteau

Personal details
- Born: Vancouver, British Columbia, Canada
- Party: Ontario Liberal
- Education: University of Western Ontario (BMSc); University of Toronto (MD); University of Oxford (MPP)
- Occupation: Physician; politician

Adil Shamji MPP is a Canadian physician and politician who has represented Don Valley East in the Ontario Legislative Assembly since 2022, as a member of the Ontario Liberal Party. Before entering politics, Shamji was an emergency physician at Michael Garron Hospital. He was born in Canada to Gujarati immigrant parents from East Africa. Shamji ran as a candidate for the 2023 Ontario Liberal Party leadership election. He withdrew from the race on September 28, 2023 and endorsed Bonnie Crombie.

== Education and medical career ==
Shamji earned a Bachelor of Medical Science (BMSc) in microbiology and immunology from the University of Western Ontario in 2007, and a Doctor of Medicine (MD) from the University of Toronto in 2011, later specializing in family medicine and emergency medicine.

Beginning in 2013, Shamji worked as a physician with Indigenous populations in rural and remote communities in Northern Ontario, the Northwest Territories and the Canadian Arctic. He carried this work on intermittently for eight years.

In 2017, Shamji completed a Master of Public Policy (MPP) from Oxford University's Blavatnik School of Government.

Shortly after returning to Toronto, the COVID-19 pandemic hit. Shamji worked as the medical director of the enhanced shelter support program, which provides medical care to homeless people, establishing primary care clinics in eight hotels leased out by the city as temporary shelters.

== Political career ==
Shamji was elected to the Legislative Assembly of Ontario in the 2022 provincial election. He is the Liberal Party's critic for health, northern development, Indigenous affairs, and colleges and universities. As of July 7, 2024, he serves as the Liberal Party critic for Health, Housing, and Northern and Indigenous Issues.

Shamji announced in March 2023 that he was exploring a run for the 2023 Ontario Liberal Party leadership election, and he formally announced his candidacy on July 4. He withdrew from the race on September 28, 2023 and endorsed Bonnie Crombie; Crombie announced that she would adopt parts of his health and education platforms into hers.

=== Member of Provincial Parliament ===
Shamji introduced Bill 10, Publication of Mandate Letters Act, 2022, which would require the premier to publish all mandate letters sent out to government ministers and their parliamentary assistants.

==== Committee work ====
Shamji serves as a member of the Standing Committee for Social Policy.

In March and April 2023, he debated Bill 60, proposing 45 amendments to the healthcare legislation.

==== Liberal health critic ====
In the fall of 2022, Shamji released Ontario Health reports on emergency room system performance to the public on a monthly basis. In a January 2023 article, Radio-Canada wrote the following (translated from French):

“It didn't take long for the new MPP for Don Valley East to get comfortable in Queen's Park. The emergency physician often participated in scrums to bring the Liberal response to the actions of the government. Dr. Shamji's interventions are often relevant, and he rarely falls into partisanship. Again, this fall, the health file has often attracted attention, which has allowed this newcomer to the Liberals alignment to shine. Could the Liberal Party leadership race interest him?”

Shamji tabled Bill 67, Temporary Nursing Agency Licensing and Registration Act, 2023, which proposed the establishment of a licensing body, licensing requirements, and regulations for temporary nursing agencies. The bill came as Ontario deals with a severe shortage of healthcare staff, which in turn leads to increased wait times for hospital care. Shamji told CBC News:

"What I'm proposing with this bill is to take aim at some of the most outrageous, some of the most predatory hiring and recruitment practices that are employed by these temporary, for-profit nursing agencies."

He also introduced Bill 72, Health Professionals’ Week Act, 2023, which seeks to recognize the third week of June each year as Health Professionals’ Week.

==== Leadership campaign ====
Shamji announced his candidacy for the leadership of the Liberal Party in May 2023 but withdrew as a candidate in September and endorsed Mississauga mayor Bonnie Crombie, who went on to win the December 2, 2023 Ontario Liberal Party leadership election.

== Personal life ==
Shamji lives in Toronto with his wife, who is a dentist. Shamji's sister is a healthcare professional as well, a nurse. Shamji was once granted a Polar bear skull by the community of an Indigenous Elder, after resuscitating her and saving her life. Shamji was also a former Warrant Officer First Class within the Royal Canadian Air Cadets, and served as the reviewing officer for the 45th ceremonial review of the 166 Bulldog Air Cadets Squadron.

== Electoral history ==
2025 Ontario general election: Don Valley East
Party	Candidate	Votes	%	±%
Liberal	Adil Shamji	15,465	56.65	+12.79
Progressive Conservative	Roger Gingerich	8,784	32.17	–0.02
New Democratic	Frank Chu	2,094	7.67	–7.84
Green	Joshua Miersch	778	2.85	–1.21
Moderate	Krasimir Penkov	180	0.66	+0.36
Total valid votes		27,301	99.05	
Total rejected, unmarked and declined ballots		263	0.95	+0.08
Turnout		27,564	40.08	–2.29
Eligible voters		68,774		
Liberal hold		Swing		▲6.40
Source: Elections Ontario

2022 Ontario general election: Don Valley East
Party	Candidate	Votes	%	±%	Expenditures
Liberal	Adil Shamji	12,313	43.86	+7.93	$62,597
Progressive Conservative	Sam Moini	9,038	32.19	–0.90	$68,119
New Democratic	Mara-Elena Nagy	4,355	15.51	–11.93	$62,411
Green	Rizwan Khan	1,139	4.06	+1.52	$2,544
New Blue	Denyse Twagiramariya	323	1.15	–	$0
Ontario Party	Donald McMullen	295	1.05	–	$0
Independent	Stella Kargiannakis	192	0.68	–	$0
Consensus Ontario	Dimitre Popov	180	0.64	–	$2,049
Freedom	Wayne Simmons	156	0.56	+0.19	$0
Moderate	Svetlozar Aleksiev	85	0.30	–	$0
Total valid votes/expense limit		28,076	99.13	–	$93,577
Total rejected, unmarked and declined ballots		247	0.87	–0.05	
Turnout		28,323	42.37	–12.85	
Eligible voters		66,841			
Liberal hold		Swing		▲4.41	
Source: Elections Ontario
