= Miller ministry (Ontario) =

Cabinet of Ontario, 1985

- 19th ministry of Ontario
- Date formed: February 8, 1985
- Date dissolved: June 26, 1985

People and organisations
- Monarch: Elizabeth II
- Lieutenant Governor: John Black Aird (1985)
- Premier: Frank Miller
- Deputy Premier: Bob Welch (February 8, 1985-May 17, 1985); Bette Stephenson (May 17, 1985-June 26, 1985)
- Member party: Progressive Conservative
- Status in legislature: Majority (February 8, 1985-May 2, 1985); Minority (May 2, 1985-June 26, 1985)
- Opposition party: Liberal
- Opposition leader: David Peterson (1985)

History
- Election: 1985
- Legislature term: 32nd Parliament of Ontario 33rd Parliament of Ontario
- Incoming formation: 1985 PC leadership convention
- Outgoing formation: resignation of Miller
- Predecessor: Davis ministry
- Successor: Peterson ministry

The Miller ministry was the combined cabinet (formally the Executive Council of Ontario) that governed Ontario from February 8, 1985, to June 26, 1985. It was led by the 19th premier of Ontario, Frank Miller. The ministry was made up of members of the Progressive Conservative Party of Ontario, which commanded a first a majority and then a minority in the Legislative Assembly of Ontario.

The ministry replaced the Davis ministry following the resignation of Premier Bill Davis and the 1985 PC leadership convention. The Miller ministry governed through the last few months of the 32nd Parliament of Ontario and the first few weeks of the 33rd Parliament of Ontario.

After the 1985 Ontario general election, Miller won a plurality of seats but failed to retain the confidence of the Ontario Legislative Assembly. Miller resigned, and was succeeded as Premier of Ontario by David Peterson.

== First Miller ministry ==
Miller began with 33 cabinet members serving in 28 (soon to be 29) portfolios. This was the largest cabinet in Ontario's history; Miller also carried an unprecedented seven ministers without portfolios.

23 of the cabinet members had previous ministry experience. Two of these established cabinet ministers had competed with Miller for leadership of the PC Party only weeks previously: Larry Grossman (appointed Treasurer and Minister of Economics), and Dennis Timbrell (appointed Minister of Municipal Affairs and Housing). Also among the experienced cabinet members were Premier Miller himself, Bette Stephenson (appointed Chair of Management Board of Cabinet), and Bob Welch (appointed Deputy Premier and Attorney General).

Among the ten newly appointed cabinet ministers were future Premiers Mike Harris (appointed Minister of Natural Resources} and Ernie Eves (appointed Provincial Secretary for Resource Development and, on March 22, 1985, to the newly created portfolio of Ministry of Skills Development).

By the time the election occurred, three cabinet members would be serving in two portfolios: Miller (Premier and Intergovernmental Affairs), Eves (Provincial Secretary for Resource Development and Minister of Skills Development), as well as Keith Norton (Minister of Education and Minister of Colleges and Universities).

The first Miller ministry lasted 98 days.

== Second Miller ministry ==
After the May 2, 1985, election, the PC Party saw its majority vanish, at they plummeted from 70 to 52 seats, still a plurality in the Legislative Assembly, but eleven shy of a majority. Eight cabinet ministers would lose their seats, while veteran cabinet members Bob Welch and James Snow did not contest their seats, thus creating ten vacancies.

This election marked a significant turning point in Ontario politics as the Tories would see their political base move out of Toronto and into the rural areas of Ontario over the next several elections. Four of the eight lost seats were situated in Metro Toronto, and the PC party saw their share of Toronto representation drop from 18 of 29 seats to a mere 10 of 29.

Miller signaled a recognition of this shifting political base in the way he filled the vacancies. He did not add a single new Toronto MPP to his cabinet, but selected three MPPs from the previously neglected Peel, York, and Durham regions that surround Metro Toronto: before the election they only had Ashe and Gregory, but after they added to those two Cousens, Cureatz, and Stevenson.

Ultimately, Miller would assemble a cabinet of 28 members on May 17, 1985, to fill 29 portfolios. He would carry four MWPs; Grossman would cover three portfolios while Harris, Timbrell and Pope would each cover two.

The second Miller ministry would last 40 days.

== List of ministers ==
Miller ministry by leadership position
Position	Minister	Tenure	
Position	Minister	Start	End
Premier of Ontario	Frank Miller	February 8, 1985	June 26, 1985
Deputy Premier of Ontario	Bob Welch	February 8, 1985	May 17, 1985
Deputy Premier of Ontario	Bette Stephenson	May 17, 1985	June 26, 1985
Chair of Cabinet	Claude Bennett	February 8, 1985	June 26, 1985
House Leader	Bob Welch	February 20, 1985	May 1, 1985
House Leader	Larry Grossman	May 17, 1985	June 26, 1985
Chief Whip	Alan Robinson	February 8, 1985	May 17, 1985
Chief Whip	Robert C. Mitchell	May 17, 1985	June 26, 1985

Miller ministry by portfolio
Portfolio	Minister	Tenure	
Portfolio	Minister	Start	End
Chair of the Management Board of Cabinet	Bette Stephenson	February 8, 1985	May 17, 1985
Chair of the Management Board of Cabinet	George Ashe	May 17, 1985	June 26, 1985
Minister of Agriculture and Food	Philip Andrewes	February 8, 1985	May 17, 1985
Minister of Agriculture and Food	K. Ross Stevenson	May 17, 1985	June 26, 1985
Attorney General	Bob Welch	February 8, 1985	May 17, 1985
Attorney General	Alan Pope	May 17, 1985	June 26, 1985
Minister of Citizenship and Culture	Susan Fish	February 8, 1985	May 17, 1985
Minister of Citizenship and Culture	Nick Leluk	May 17, 1985	June 26, 1985
Minister of Colleges and Universities	Keith Norton	February, 1985	May 17, 1985
Minister of Colleges and Universities	Larry Grossman	May 17, 1985	June 26, 1985
Minister of Community and Social Services	Robert Elgie	February 8, 1985	May 17, 1985
Minister of Community and Social Services	Ernie Eves	May 17, 1985	June 26, 1985
Minister of Consumer and Commercial Relations	Gordon Walker	February 8, 1985	May 17, 1985
Minister of Consumer and Commercial Relations	Bob Runciman	May 17, 1985	June 26, 1985
Minister of Correctional Services	Nick Leluk	February 8, 1985	May 1, 1985
Minister of Correctional Services	Don Cousens	May 17, 1985	June 26, 1985
Minister of Education	Keith Norton	February 8, 1985	May 17, 1985
Minister of Education	Larry Grossman	May 17, 1985	June 26, 1985
Minister of Energy	George Ashe	February 8, 1985	May 17, 1985
Minister of Energy	Mike Harris	May 17, 1985	June 26, 1985
Minister of the Environment	Morley Kells	February 8, 1985	May 17, 1985
Minister of the Environment	Susan Fish	May 17, 1985	June 26, 1985
Treasurer (Note: Ministries before and after Miller called this position "Treasurer and Minister of Economics", but Miller did not.)	Larry Grossman	February 8, 1985	May 1, 1985
Treasurer	Bette Stephenson	May 17, 1985	June 26, 1985
Minister of Government Services	Bob Runciman	February 8, 1985	May 17, 1985
Minister of Government Services	Jim Gordon	May 17, 1985	June 26, 1985
Minister of Health	Alan Pope	February 8, 1985	May 17, 1985
Minister of Health	Philip Andrewes	May 17, 1985	June 26, 1985
Minister of Intergovernmental Affairs	Frank Miller	February 8, 1985	May 17, 1985
Minister of Intergovernmental Affairs	Reuben Baetz	May 17, 1985	June 26, 1985
Minister of Industry and Trade	Andy Brandt	February 8, 1985	June 26, 1985
Minister of Labour	Russ Ramsay	February 8, 1985	May 17, 1985
Minister of Labour	Robert Elgie	May 17, 1985	June 26, 1985
Minister of Municipal Affairs and Housing	Dennis Timbrell	February 8, 1985	June 26, 1985
Minister of Natural Resources	Mike Harris	February 8, 1985	June 26, 1985
Minister of Northern Affairs	Leo Bernier	February 8, 1985	June 26, 1985
Minister Responsible for French Language; Service	vacant	February 8, 1985	May 17, 1985
Minister Responsible for French Language; Service	Alan Pope	May 17, 1985	June 26, 1985
Minister Responsible for Women's Issues	Dennis Timbrell	February 8, 1985	June 26, 1985
Minister of Revenue	Bud Gregory	February 8, 1985	May 17, 1985
Minister of Revenue	Gordon Dean	May 17, 1985	June 26, 1985
Ministry of Skills Development (Note: Renamed "Ministry of Skills Development" on March 22, 1985)	Ernie Eves	February 8, 1985	May 17, 1985
Ministry of Skills Development	Phil Gillies	May 17, 1985	June 26, 1985
Minister of Tourism and Recreation	Claude Bennett	February 8, 1985	June 26, 1985
Minister of Transportation and Communications	George McCague	February 8, 1985	June 26, 1985
Ministers; Without Portfolios	Phil Gillies	February 8, 1985	May 17, 1985
Ministers; Without Portfolios	René Piché	February 8, 1985	May 17, 1985
Ministers; Without Portfolios	Alan Robinson	February 8, 1985	May 17, 1985
Ministers; Without Portfolios	David Rotenberg	February 8, 1985	May 17, 1985
Ministers; Without Portfolios	James W. Snow	February 8, 1985	May 17, 1985
Ministers; Without Portfolios	Sam Cureatz	May 17, 1985	June 26, 1985
Ministers; Without Portfolios	Noble Villeneuve	May 17, 1985	June 26, 1985
Ministers; Without Portfolios	Al McLean	February 8, 1985	June 26, 1985
Ministers; Without Portfolios	Robert C. Mitchell	February 8, 1985	June 26, 1985
Provincial Secretary for Justice	Reuben Baetz	February 8, 1985	May 1, 1985
Provincial Secretary for Justice	Alan Pope	May 17, 1985	June 26, 1985
Provincial Secretary for Resource; Development	Ernie Eves	February 8, 1985	May 1, 1985
Provincial Secretary for Resource; Development	Dennis Timbrell	May 17, 1985	June 26, 1985
Provincial Secretary for Social; Development	Gordon Dean	February 8, 1985	May 1, 1985
Provincial Secretary for Social; Development	Larry Grossman	May 17, 1985	June 26, 1985
Solicitor General	John Reesor Williams	February 8, 1985	May 17, 1985
Solicitor General	Bud Gregory	May 17, 1985	June 26, 1985
