= 1985 Progressive Conservative Party of Ontario leadership elections =

The Ontario Progressive Conservative Party (the "PC Party") held two leadership conventions in 1985. The earlier convention, convened in January to selected a successor to outgoing leader Bill Davis was of substantially greater significance as it was held while the party was in government, and consequently the elected leader, Frank Miller, also automatically became the premier-elect. The latter convention, convened in November after the party's forty-two-year rule having ended, elected Larry Grossman, the runner-up in the January convention, to succeed Miller.

== January Convention Background ==
1985 Progressive Conservative Party of Ontario leadership election
- Date: January 26, 1985
- Convention: CNE Coliseum, Exhibition Place, Toronto, Ontario
- Resigning leader: Bill Davis
- Won by: Frank Miller
- Ballots: 3
- Candidates: 4

The January convention was held at the CNE Coliseum at Exhibition Place in Toronto to choose a replacement for William Davis, who had served as Ontario PC leader and Premier of Ontario since 1971. Davis had been expected to call an election to seek a further mandate from the voters, but surprised pundits by retiring from political life instead.

== Contestants ==
=== Prospective contenders ===
Over his fourteen year tenure, Premier Bill Davis had elevated a long roster of ambitious political figures to his cabinet and given them opportunities to demonstrate their worth to PC Party members and to the general public. Davis prospective bid for the federal party leadership in 1983 served potential contenders notice that a succession contest would likely come sooner rather than later. When Davis announced his pending retirement in October, 1984, the press speculated about as many as a dozen prospective contestants, including some prominent cabinet veterans:

- Larry Grossman, MPP for St. Andrew—St. Patrick (Toronto) Provincial Treasurer
- Frank Miller, MPP for Muskoka, Minister of Industry and Trade
- Alan Pope, MPP for Cochrane South, Minister of Natural Resources
- Bette Stephenson, MPP for York Mills (Toronto) Minister of Education & Minister of Colleges and Universities
- Roy McMurtry, MPP for Eglinton (Toronto) Attorney-General
- Dennis Timbrell, MPP for Don Mills (Toronto) Minister of Agriculture and Food
- Gordon Walker, MPP for London South, Provincial Secretary for Justice
- Claude Bennett, MPP for Ottawa South, Minister of Municipal Affairs and Housing
- Darcy McKeough, former MPP for Chatham—Kent, the youngest among the serious contenders at the 1971 convention and the kingmaker who rescued Davis' leadership bid, retired from the legislature in 1978 as Treasurer and Minister of Economics and Intergovernmental Affairs

along with a few newer rising stars elevated in 1983:

- Philip Andrewes, MPP for Lincoln, Minister of Energy
- Andy Brandt, MPP for Sarnia, Minister of the Environment
- Susan Fish, MPP for St. George (Toronto) Minister of Citizenship and Culture

Grossman, Timbrell, and Miller have all previously stated their intention to seek the party leadership in a future contest and have been organizing for future bids for a number of years. Miller, the oldest among the prospective contenders, had however ruled himself out of the contest a few weeks earlier and dismantled his campaign team after the federal PC Party landslide victory in the 1984 election. (Note: Miller was convinced that Davis would remain leader and contest at least one more election as the federal PC victory in 1984 meant the federal party leadership would not be open in the near future.)

=== Contestants ===
Four members of the Davis ministry entered the actual contest. Three of them representing electoral districts in Metro Toronto. Miller, Timbrell and Grossman served as successive health ministers, the ministry with the largest budget in the government. Grossman succeeded Miller as Provincial Treasurer, and both have held the industry portfolio.

==== Frank Miller ====
The Minister of Industry and Trade was first elected MPP for Muskoka in 1971, Miller enter the ministry in 1974 as health minister and served as natural resources minister from 1977 to 1978 before being promoted to the crucial role of Provincial Treasurer, holding the portfolio for five years until 1983. Prior to his election to the legislature, he was an engineer, a used car dealer, and a member of the Bracebridge town council. At 57 he was the oldest of the contestants.

Caucus Endorsements: (25, inclusive of 10 cabinet ministers & 1 former minister)

- Philip Andrewes (Lincoln, Minister of Energy, in cabinet since 1983)
- George Ashe (Durham West, Minister of Government Services, in cabinet since 1981)
- Claude Bennett (Ottawa South, Minister of Municipal Affairs and Housing, in cabinet since 1972)
- Bud Gregory (Mississauga East, Minister of Revenue, in cabinet since 1977)
- Nick Leluk (York West, Minister of Correctional Services, in cabinet since 1981)
- George McCague (Dufierin-Simcoe, Chair of the Management Board of Cabinet & Chair of Cabinet, in cabinet since 1977)
- Alan Pope (Cochrane South, Minister of Natural Resources, in cabinet since 1979)
- James Snow (Oakville, Minister of Transportation and Communications, in cabinet since 1971)
- Bette Stephenson (York Mills, Minister of Education & Minister of Colleges and Universities, in cabinet since 1975)
- Gordon Wayne Walker (London South, Provincial Secretary for Justice, in cabinet since 1978)
- George Kerr (Burlington South, in cabinet 1969–78)
- Bill Barlow (Cambridge)
- Ernie Eves (Parry Sound)
- Mike Harris (Nipissing)
- Bill Hodgson (York North)
- Morley Kells (Humber)
- Doug Kennedy (Mississauga South)
- Al McLean (Simcoe East)
- Bob Mitchell (Carlelon)
- Bob Runciman (Leeds)
- Jim Taylor (Prince Edward–Lennox)
- Lorne Henderson (Lamblon)
- René Piché (Cochrane North)
- Howard Sheppard (Northumberland)
- John Williams (Oriole)

==== Larry Grossman ====
The 41 year-old Provincial Treasurer succeed his father, a former cabinet minister with service that spanned the Frost, Robarts and Davis ministries, as the MPP for St. Andrew—St. Patrick in 1975. He entered the ministry in 1977 as the Minister of Consumer and Commercial Relations, and served as Minister of Industry and Tourism from 1978, as Minister of Health from 1982 before replacing Miller as Provincial Treasurer in 1983.

Caucus Endorsements: (10, inclusive of 3 cabinet ministers)

- Russ Ramsay (Sault Ste. Marie, Minister of Labour, in cabinet since 1981)
- George Taylor (Simcoe Centre, Solicitor General, in cabinet since 1982)
- Susan Fish (St. George, Minister of Citizenship and Culture, in cabinet since 1983)
- Phil Gillies (Brantford)
- Jim Gordon (Sudbury)
- Bruce McCaffrey (Armourdale)
- Yuri Shymko (High Park–Swansea)
- Ross Stevenson (Durham York)
- Paul Yakabuski (Renfrew South)
- Mickey Hennessy (Fort William)

==== Dennis Timbrell ====
When the 38 year-old Minister of Agriculture and Food was first elected MPP for the North York electoral district of Don Mills in 1971 at the tender age of 24, he had already served as North York alderman for close to two years. He entered the ministry in 1974 at age 27 as a minister without portfolio and was designated as the minister responsible for youth, in doing so set a new record for being the youngest Ontario cabinet member. He was promoted to energy minister in 1975 and to health minister in 1977 before being named agriculture minister in 1982.

Caucus Endorsements: (18, inclusive of 6 cabinet ministers & 1 former minister)

- Bob Welch (Brock, Deputy Premier & Minister Responsible for Women's Issues, in cabinet since 1966)
- Keith Norton (Kingston and The Islands, Minister of Health, in cabinet since 1977)
- Leo Bernier (Kenora, Minister of Northern Affairs, in cabinet since 1971)
- Norm Sterling (Carleton-Grenville, Provincial Secretary for Resource Development, in cabinet since 1981)
- Gordon Dean (Wentworth, Provincial Secretary for Social Development, in cabinet since 1983)
- Bob Eaton (Middlesex, Minister without portfolio, Chief Whip, in cabinet since 1982)
- Margaret Birch (Scarborough East, in cabinet 1972–83)
- Sam Cureatz (Durham East)
- Jack Johnson (Wellington–Dufferin–Peel)
- Terry Jones (Mississauga North)
- Ron McNeil (Elgin)
- Alan Robinson (Scarborough-Ellesmere)
- Dick Treleaven (Oxford)
- Noble Villeneuve (Stormont–Dundas–Glengarry)
- Douglas Wiseman (Lanark)
- Ed Havrot (Timiskaming)
- Jim Pollock (Hastings–Peterborough)
- David Rotenberg (Wilson Heights)

==== Roy McMurtry ====
The 52 year-old Attorney-General had been a close friend of the outgoing premier along with Government House Leader Tom Wells since theirs days as teammates on the University of Toronto's football team. Long a major player in the PC Party backroom, and was credited for having played a significant role in bringing together the campaign of Davis and his primacy leadership rival Allan Lawrence to build the Big Blue Machine. He was first elected MPP for Eglinton in 1975 and was immediately brought into cabinet as Attorney General. From 1978 to 1982 he also concurrently held the portfolio of Solicitor General.

Caucus Endorsements: (7, inclusive of 3 cabinet ministers)

- Reuben Baetz (Ottawa West, Minister of Tourism & Recreation, in cabinet since 1978)
- Frank Drea (Scarborough Centre, Minister of Community & Social Services, in cabinet since 1977)
- Robert Elgie (York East, Minister of Consumer & Commercial Relations, in cabinet since 1978)
- Don Cousens (York Centre)
- Al Kolyn (Lakeshore)
- Earl McEwen (Frontenac–Addington)
- Bob MacQuarrie (Carleton East)

=== Contest dynamic ===
Grossman and McMurtry were considered to be Red Tories who would continue in the tradition of moderate government maintained by Davis and his predecessor as leader and premier, John Robarts. Miller was supported by the right wing of the party, who believed that he would take a more aggressive approach to reducing the size of the provincial government. Timbrell was viewed as on the party's right but not as right as Miller.

In initial candidate debates, few differences in policy emerged. Instead the differences manifested in political outlook. Miller, supported by 25 members of caucus, was viewed as the candidate of small town conservatism. Grossman, with 10 supporting members was the candidate of high-powered urbanity. Timbrell with 18 supporting members was seen more along the lines of the previous leader, aping Davis's pragmatic blandness. McMurtry coming in last with 7 supporting members tried to portray a populist image with links to ethnic communities.

=== Procedure ===
The voters at the convention consisted of delegates elected from PC riding associations (each entitled to send ten), delegates elected from other PC associations such as those for women, campuses, youth and business groups, as well as ex-officio delegates such as party members who held elected office, and members of the party's executive bodies.

=== Convention ===
During the convention an 'Anybody But Miller' pact was a significant influence. Miller's convention speech was solid, yet unspectacular. If anything it reassured delegates who were concerned over policy gaffes made by Miller before the convention. Miller emerged with a significant lead on the first ballot which he kept through to the final ballot. As each candidate with the fewest votes was dropped after each ballot, he threw his support behind Grossman, which seemed to confirm the 'Anybody But Miller' pact theory. Grossman edged out Timbrell for second place on the second ballot and, facing elimination, demanded a recount which produced the same result. After the second ballot when Timbrell threw his support to Grossman, his supporters were more divided and enough of them voted for Miller to enable him to win the convention.

=== Ballot results ===
Delegate support by ballot
Candidate	1st ballot		2nd ballot		3rd ballot	
Name	Votes cast	%	Votes cast	%	Votes cast	%
Frank Miller	591	35.0	659	39.2	869	52.3
Larry Grossman	378	22.4	514	30.5	792	47.7
Dennis Timbrell	421	24.9	508	30.2		
Roy McMurtry	300	17.8				
Total	1,690	100.0	1,681	100.0	1,661	100.0

== November Convention ==
1985 Progressive Conservative Party of Ontario leadership election
- Date: November 16, 1985
- Convention: Metro Convention Centre, Toronto, Ontario
- Resigning leader: Frank Miller
- Won by: Larry Grossman
- Ballots: 2
- Candidates: 3

Following the party's poor showing in the 1985 election, the party retained power with only a slim plurality of four seats and lost their government majority status. The opposition Liberals gained the support of the third party, the New Democratic Party. The Liberals and the NDP negotiated an accord whereby the NDP agreed to support the Liberals in a new government provided that they support NDP policy initiatives. On June 26, 1985, the Liberals passed a motion of no confidence and the PCs fell from power for the first time in 42 years. Miller resigned as leader, and a new convention was called, to be held again in Toronto.

Timbrell and Grossman announced their intentions to run, along with Alan Pope, who had been Minister of Natural Resources in the Davis government. This time, Grossman had a clear lead going into the convention. Pope was dropped after the first ballot, and Grossman a narrow victory on the second ballot.

=== Ballot results ===
(Held at the Metro Toronto Convention Centre, Toronto on November 16, 1985.)

First ballot:

- GROSSMAN, Larry 752
- TIMBRELL, Dennis 661
- POPE, Alan 271

Second ballot:

- GROSSMAN, Larry 848
- TIMBRELL, Dennis 829
