= Davis ministry =

Cabinet of Ontario, 1971–1985

- ministry of Ontario

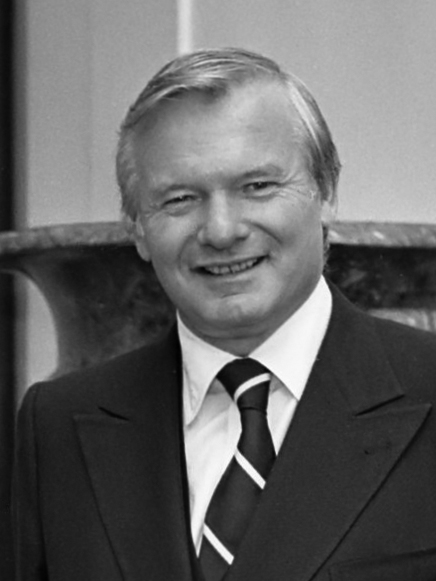
- Premier Bill Davis in 1979
- Date formed: March 1, 1971
- Date dissolved: February 8, 1985

People and organizations
- Monarch: Elizabeth II
- Lieutenant Governor: W. Ross Macdonald (1971-74); Pauline McGibbon (1974-80); John Black Aird (1980-85)
- Premier: Bill Davis
- Deputy Premier: Bob Welch (1977-85)
- No. of ministers: 24 (at start) minimum 22 (February 1972) maximum 31 (July 1983)
- Total no. of members: 66
- Member party: Progressive Conservative
- Status in legislature: Majority (1971-75; 1981-85); Minority (1975-81)
- Opposition party: Liberal; New Democratic
- Opposition leader: Robert Nixon (1971-75,82); Stephen Lewis (1975-77); Stuart Smith (1977-81); David Peterson (1982-85)

History
- Incoming formation: 1971 PC leadership convention
- Outgoing formation: resignation
- Elections: 1971, 1975, 1977, 1981
- Legislature terms: 28th, 29th, 30th, 31st, 32nd Ontario Parliaments
- Predecessor: Robarts ministry
- Successor: Miller ministry

The Davis ministry was the cabinet (formally the Executive Council of Ontario) that led the provincial government of Ontario, Canada from March 1, 1971, to February 8, 1985. Led by the 18th Premier of Ontario, Bill Davis and made up of members of the Progressive Conservative Party of Ontario (PC), its fourteen years long tenure was the longest in the 20th century, and second longest serving ministry of Ontario of all time, second only the Mowat ministry's twenty four years in the late nineteenth century.

The ministry replaced the Robarts ministry following the resignation of Premier John Robarts and Davis' victory at the 1971 PC leadership convention. The ministry inherited a governing mandate from the Robarts ministry earned in 1967. The ministry was sustained by electoral mandates secured by the PC party under Davis' leadership in four general elections: two majority mandates in 1971 and 1981, and two minority mandates in 1975 and 1977. The ministry tenure spanned from the 28th to the 32nd Parliament of Ontario, commanding majority support in the 28th, 29th and 32nd parliaments.

Davis retired from electoral politics and resigned as Premier of Ontario in 1985. He and his ministry were respectively succeeded by Frank Miller, a member of the ministry, and the short-lived Miller ministry, which drew the Progressive Conservative's continual rule of forty-two years to a close.

== Composition overview and notable facts ==
Sixty-six individuals served in the Davis ministry over its fourteen years tenure. It started with twenty-four men: seventeen of whom (including Davis himself) have served in the Robarts ministry, and among them three were veterans from the Frost ministry. Davis initially elevated seven new minister, including Edward Arunah Dunlop Jr., who have announced his intention to not seek re-election prior.

When Davis was elected party leader in 1971, the PC caucus' sixty eight members at the time consisted of one woman, Ada Prichard, of Hamilton, who was in her seventies and had announced her intention to retire at the next election. The ministry would usher in first four women cabinet ministers in Ontario history: Margaret Birch (elevated in September 1972), Margaret Scrivener and Bette Stephenson (both elevated in October 1975), and Susan Fish (elevated in July 1983).

Davis commenced the practice of formally conferring the honorary titles Deputy Premier and Chair of Cabinet on selected senior cabinet members. Davis' erstwhile leadership rival turned trusted confidant Bob Welch was named Ontario's first deputy premier in 1977.

Despite the ministry's long lifespan and large rosters of members, it did not prove to be a major talent pipeline for future Progressive Conservative ministries beyond the 32nd parliament. No member of the Davis ministry other than Frank Miller went on to serve as Premier. Only one member, Norm Sterling, ironically one of only three ministers dropped by Miller, served in future ministries when the Progressive Conservatives returned to power. The Miller ministry that followed, despite only lasted four months, included four members who would serve in future ministries, including two future premiers.

Industry Minister John Rhodes' 1978 death from a heart attack while on a trade mission to Iran was, as of June 2026, the last time a member of Ontario cabinet died in office. Memorial service was held in the legislature's grand staircase to allow instead of inside the chamber to allow for greater access by the public. Frank Miller survived a heart attack, ini 1976 while he was health minister.

Given its extended tenure, the ministry unsurprisingly had implemented many policies and measures with lasting impact to the province and its people. It also implemented sweeping realignment of the organizational structure of Government of Ontario to modernize its operations and service delivery. In the process it renamed departments as ministries across the government in 1972. (Note: Around the same time Alberta and British Columbia also converted their departments to ministries.) These reorganization efforts defined much of the functional scope of ministries and many key features of the government that Ontarians are familiar with today.

Initial streamlining effort by the ministry eliminated and merged a handful of departments with overlapping scope and brought the total number of functional ministries from twenty-two at the end of the Robarts ministry down to nineteen in April 1972 (Note: The primary legislation that effected the 1972 reorganization, the Government Reorganization Act, 1972 provided for 22 cabinet positions, including three provincial secretaries that were not in charge of functional ministries.) while trimming the size of cabinet to twenty-two members. However, ministries further proliferated and additional ministers without portfolio were added over the ministry's tenure. The size of the cabinet reach its peak of thirty-one members in July 1983. At the end of the Davis ministry, there were twenty-five line ministries in the Ontario government. (Note: The Executive Council Amendment Act brought the list of cabinet position to twenty nine, which included the deputy premier title and three provincial secretaries titles that were not associated with functional ministries.)

== Administrative Reorganization ==
=== Early realignment ===
Davis implemented three one-off adjustments to the ministry in the early months of his premiership prior to the 1971 general election.

- The highways and the transport departments were merged to form the Department of Transportation and Communications
- The energy and resource management department was replaced by the Department of the Environment
- The university affairs department, a portfolio Davis held himself since its establishment in 1964, was renamed the Department of Colleges and Universities

=== 1972 reorganization ===
Having secured a majority mandate under his own name, Davis formally kickstarted the most sweeping administrative reorganization in Ontario history for the stated purpose of modernizing policy-making and technocratic efficiency in early 1972. The reorganization was prompted by the recommendation of the Committee on Government Productivity (COGP) established in January 1970 that consisted of five senior civil servants of deputy minister rank and four business leaders who were president of major corporations based in Ontario. The committee conducted extensive engagement and studies and tabled ten reports between 1970 and 1973 proposing detailed and sweeping reorganization of the government and modernization of its operation. The first set of interim recommendations on department reorganization were contained in COGP's third report tabled in December 1971.

The reorganization came in multiple phases. A significant recommendation was to group all the portfolio department by policy areas each with a senior policy minister as overseer. Davis acted on the recommendations and in January 1972. The legacy office of “Provincial Secretary and Registrar”, one of the five original offices enacted by the British North America Act of 1867, was to be eliminated, and to be replaced by three provincial secretaries for three distinct policy fields – justice, social development and resources developments. They along with the Treasurer were to function as super ministers coordinating policy development and providing oversight of the various ministries in their grouping. Policy committees of cabinet were realigned to be chaired by these provincial secretaries, and secretariats were established for each to provide analytical and research support to the provincial secretaries and the committees.

Davis put his four former leadership rivals in charge of the four policy areas initially, reflecting the seniority he intended for these provincial secretaries. While powerful positions in principle, they carried no direct operational or policy implementation authorities, leading to much reduced profile for the ministers.

- Allan Lawrence, the final rival standing against Davis in the 1971 leadership contest, as Provincial Secretary for Justice
- Bob Welch, the fourth place leadership rival who emerged as one of Davis most trusted advisors and later named deputy premier for the latter half of Davis’ premiership, as Provincial Secretary for Social Development
- Bert Lawrence, who placed fifth in the leadership contest, as Provincial Secretary for Resource Development
- Darcy McKeough, who placed third, was already in place as Treasurer

The second phase was a major cabinet shuffle that took place on February 2, through which the substantive details of the reorganization were unveiled. Other than two ministers who did not seek reelection in 1971, Arthur Wishart and Edward Arunah Dunlop Jr, no incumbent minister was dropped from cabinet and no new minister entered the ministry during the February 1972 shuffle. However, all but two ministers were impacted by this shuffle. All twenty-one ministers, inclusive of the three provincial secretaries, were all of full portfolio minister status following the shuffle. A large number of departments saw some of their key functions or operations units (known as divisions or branches) reassigned or realigned. Some departments were to merge while new departments were spun off from existing departments. The Premier indicated that he further assess the new alignments in the following weeks, and some department names may be subject to further adjustments in the final implementation. The ministers appointed to helm realigned departments were given charge of existing, soon-to-be eliminated departments on a temporary basis between February and April to oversee the implementation of the organizations.

The lack of new faces was seized upon by the opposition and the press for criticism. Premier Davis pledged during the election campaign to include a woman in his cabinet if a Progressive Conservative woman were to be elected. ) Despite two women, Margaret Birch from Scarborough East and Margaret Scrivener from St. David's in downtown Toronto, having been elected in October, neither were included in the new cabinet. The Premier explained that he opted to include neither nor any other new members until they gain more experience in the legislature. Birch was elevated to cabinet later that year in September as a minister without portfolio.

The final phase of the reorganization was formal legislation to implement the change. The final names of the new departments, to be known as ministries, were announced by Premier Davis February 26. Unlike government shuffles in the twenty-first century, in which names of departments were altered frequently or on a transitory basis for short-term communications or marketing purposes and effected through orders-in-council without any legislative scrutiny, the Davis ministry carried out this major reorganization by actual legislative amendments. The throne speech delivered on February 29 promised, “new legislation... for the implementation of these far-reaching recommendations... and Honourable Members will have the opportunity to debate its provisions, both in principle and specific detail.” It further promised the publication of the reports of the Committee on Government Productivity, which consisted of studies and recommendations for emerging issues such as automatic data processing, communications and information, and on human resource utilization. The Government Reorganization Act, 1972 along with other legislations for the establishment of four new ministries were introduced by the Premier personally on March 17, were debated and adopted over the following weeks, and were enacted formally on April 7, 1972.

As a result of the reorganization, nine departments disappeared as a result of amalgamation or dispersal of their programs to other ministries. Eighty-six programs or parts of programs entailing 13,500 people were relocated. At the top level, the 1972 reorganization implemented the following realignment:

old "department" replaced	new "ministry" created
New (assigned certain functions from Attorney General)	Solicitor General
Treasury Board	Management Board of Cabinet
Treasury and Economics	Management Board of Cabinet
Treasury and Economics	Treasury, Economics and Intergovernmental Affairs (initially announced as Finance and Intergovernmental Affairs)
Municipal Affairs	Treasury, Economics and Intergovernmental Affairs (initially announced as Finance and Intergovernmental Affairs)
Lands and Forests	Natural Resources.
Mines and Northern Affairs	Natural Resources.
Trade and Development	Industry and Tourism (initially announced as Trade and Industry)
Tourism and Information	Industry and Tourism (initially announced as Trade and Industry)
Financial and Commercial Affairs	Consumer and Commercial Relations (initially announced as Public Protection)
Social and Family Services	Community and Social Services (initially announced as Housing and Social Services)
Public Works	Government Services
Provincial Secretary & Citizenship	Government Services

The initial allocation of portfolio recommended by the COGP were as follows:

- Justice policy field
  - attorney general
  - solicitor general
  - correctional Services
  - consumer and commercial relations
- Social development policy field
  - education
  - colleges and universities
  - community and social services
  - health
- Resources development policy field
  - agriculture and food
  - natural resources (absorbing northern affairs, mines)
  - environment (absorbing energy)
  - industry and tourism (later industry and trade)
  - transportation and communications
  - labour
- Treasury and government services
  - economics and intergovernmental affairs (absorbing municipal affairs)
  - revenue
  - government services

The department to be establish for the management board was to be directly accountable to cabinet. As the reorganization progressed various modification were made, and certain planned changes were not proceeded with while other were reversed or partially reversed.

== List of ministers ==
=== By seniority ===
First entered ministry during Frost ministry
First entered ministry during Robarts ministry
Serveice continued in Miller ministry
Involuntary departure († death | ⁎ electoral defeat) (Note: Unspecified reasons including demotion at shuffle, resignatin requested by Premier, resignation due to scandal/public pressure)

Minister	Ministerial service			Parliamentary service		
Minister	Start	End	Timespan	Start	Electoral District	Region
Bill Davis	Oct 25, 1962	Feb 8, 1985		1959	Peel North / Brampton	Central
John Yaremko	April 28, 1958	Feb 26, 1974		1951	Bellwoods	Toronto
Allan Grossman	Nov 21, 1960	Oct 7, 1975		1955	St. Andrew	Toronto
Bill Stewart	Nov 21, 1960	Oct 7, 1975		1957	Middlesex North	Southwest
James Auld	Oct 25, 1962	April 10, 1981		1954	Leeds	East
Charles MacNaughton	Oct 25, 1962	Jan 15, 1973		1958	Huron	Southwest
Arthur Wishart	March 23, 1964	Dec 8, 1971		1963	Sault Ste. Marie	North
René Brunelle	Nov 24, 1966	April 10, 1981		1958	Cochrane North	North
Dalton Bales	Nov 24, 1966	Feb 26, 1974		1963	York Mills	Toronto (metro)
Darcy McKeough	Nov 24, 1966	Aug 16, 1978 (Note: Resign from cabinet Sept. 1972, returned to different portfolio July 1973)		1963	Chatham—Kent	Southwest
Bob Welch	Nov 24, 1966	May 17, 1985		1963	Brock / Lincoln	South Central
Tom Wells	August 13, 1969	Feb 8, 1985		1963	Scarborough North	Toronto (metro)
Fernand Guindon	Nov 23, 1967	May 31, 1974		1957	Stormont	East
Allan Lawrence	Feb 13, 1968	Sep 28, 1972		1958	St. George	Toronto
John White	Oct 10, 1968	Oct 7, 1975		1959	London South	Southwest
George Kerr	June 5, 1969	Sep 11, 1978		1963	Halton West / Burlington South	Central
Bert Lawrence	August 13, 1969	Feb 26, 1974		1963	Carleton East	East (NCR)
Syl Apps	March 1, 1971	Feb 26, 1974		1963	Kingston and the Islands	East
Gordon Carton	March 1, 1971	Feb 26, 1974		1963	Armourdale	Toronto (metro)
Edward Dunlop Jr.	March 1, 1971	Oct 28, 1971		1963	York-Forest Hill	Toronto
Leo Bernier	March 1, 1971	June 26, 1985		1966	Kenora	North
Richard Potter	March 1, 1971	Oct 7, 1975		1967	Quinte	East (central)
James W. Snow	March 1, 1971	May 17, 1985		1967	Halton East / Oakville	Central
Eric Winkler	March 1, 1971	Oct 7, 1975⁎		1967	Grey South	Southwest
Claude Bennett	Sep 28, 1972	June 26, 1985		1971	Ottawa South	East
Margaret Birch	Sep 28, 1972	July 6, 1983		1971	Scarborough East	Toronto (metro)
John Clement	Sep 28, 1972	Oct 7, 1975⁎		1971	Niagara Falls	South Central
Jack McNie	Sep 28, 1972	Oct 7, 1975		1971	Hamilton West	South Central
Arthur Meen	Feb 26, 1974	June 23, 1977		1967	York East	Toronto
Sid Handleman	Feb 26, 1974	Sep 21, 1977		1971	Carleton	East (NCR)
Donald Irvine	Feb 26, 1974	Feb 3, 1977		1971	Carleton—Grenville / Grenville—Dundas	East (NCR)
Frank Miller	Feb 26, 1974	June 26, 1985		1971	Muskoka	Central
Bill Newman	Feb 26, 1974	August 30, 1979		1967	Ontario South / Durham North	Central
John Rhodes	Feb 26, 1974	Sep 25, 1978†		1971	Sault Ste. Marie	North
Dennis Timbrell	Feb 26, 1974	June 26, 1985		1971	Don Mills	Toronto (metro)
John Palmer MacBeth	May 31, 1974	Jan 21, 1978		1971	Humber	Toronto (metro)
Richard B. Beckett	June 18, 1975	Oct 7, 1975⁎		1971	Brantford	South Central
Lorne Henderson	Oct 7, 1975	July 6, 1983		1963	Lambton	Southwest
Harry Craig Parrott	Oct 7, 1975	April 10, 1981		1971	Oxford	Southwest
John Roxburgh Smith	Oct 7, 1975	June 23, 1977⁎		1967	Hamilton Mountain	South Central
Margaret Scrivener	Oct 7, 1975	Jan 21, 1978		1971	St. David	Toronto
Bette Stephenson	Oct 7, 1975	June 26, 1985		1971	Humber	Toronto (metro)
James A. Taylor	Oct 7, 1975	Jan 21, 1978		1971	Prince Edward—Lennox	East (central)
Roy McMurtry	Oct 7, 1975	Feb 8, 1985		1975	Eglinton	Toronto
Keith Norton	Feb 3, 1977	May 17, 1985		1975	Kingston and the Islands	East
Frank Drea	Sep 21, 1977	Feb 8, 1985		1971	Scarborough Centre	Toronto (metro)
Larry Grossman	Sep 21, 1977	June 26, 1985		1975	St. Andrew—St. Patrick	Toronto
George McCague	Sep 21, 1977	June 26, 1985		1975	Dufferin—Simcoe	Central
Lorne Maeck	Jan 21, 1978	April 10, 1981		1971	Parry Sound	North
Douglas Wiseman	Jan 21, 1978	July 6, 1983		1971	Lanark	East
Reuben Baetz	Jan 21, 1978	June 26, 1985		1977	Ottawa West	East (NCR)
Robert Elgie	August 18, 1978	June 26, 1985		1977	York East	Toronto
Gordon Walker	Oct 18, 1978	May 17, 1985		1971	London South	Southwest
Bud Gregory	August 29, 1979	June 26, 1985		1975	Mississauga East	Central
Alan Pope	August 30, 1979	June 26, 1985		1977	Cochrane South	North
Nick Leluk	April 10, 1981	June 26, 1985		1971	York West	Toronto (metro)
George Ashe	April 10, 1981	June 26, 1985		1977	Durham West	Central
Bruce McCaffrey	April 10, 1981	Dec 23, 1983		1977	Armourdale	Toronto (metro)
Norm Sterling	April 10, 1981	Feb 8, 1985 (Note: Served in later Harris and Eves ministries)		1977	Carleton—Grenville	East (NCR)
Russ Ramsay	April 10, 1981	May 17, 1985		1978	Sault Ste. Marie	North
Robert G. Eaton	Feb 13, 1982	Feb 8, 1985		1971	Middlesex	Southwest
George William Taylor	Feb 13, 1982	June 26, 1985		1977	Simcoe Centre	Central
Philip Andrewes	July 6, 1983	June 26, 1985		1981	Lincoln	South Central
Andy Brandt	July 6, 1983	June 26, 1985		1981	Sarnia	Southwest
Gordon Howlett Dean	July 6, 1983	June 26, 1985		1981	Wentworth	South Central
Susan Fish	July 6, 1983	June 26, 1985		1981	St. George	Toronto

=== By portfolio (grouped by policy area) ===
Portfolio	Minister	Tenure	
Portfolio	Minister	Start	End
Central administration
Premier and President of Council	Bill Davis	March 1, 1971	February 8, 1985
Deputy Premier (Note: Title not in use prior)	Bob Welch	September 21, 1977	February 8, 1985
Chair of the Management Board of Cabinet (Note: Portfolio established February 2, 1972 and assumed expense management corporate management functions from the Treasury Board, which was a unit within the Treasury Department)	Charles MacNaughton	February 2, 1972	September 28, 1972
Chair of the Management Board of Cabinet	Eric Winkler	September 28, 1972	October 7, 1975
Chair of the Management Board of Cabinet	James Auld	October 7, 1975	August 18, 1978
Chair of the Management Board of Cabinet	George McCague	August 18, 1978	February 8, 1985
Treasury & government services
Treasurer and Minister of Economics, Chair of the Treasury Board	Darcy McKeough	March 1, 1971	February 2, 1972
Treasurer and Minister of Economics and Intergovernmental Affairs	Darcy McKeough	February 2, 1972	September 7, 1972
Treasurer and Minister of Economics and Intergovernmental Affairs	Charles MacNaughton	September 7, 1972	January 15, 1973
Treasurer and Minister of Economics and Intergovernmental Affairs	John White	January 15, 1973	June 18, 1975
Treasurer and Minister of Economics and Intergovernmental Affairs	Darcy McKeough	June 18, 1975	August 16, 1978
Treasurer and Minister of Economics and Intergovernmental Affairs	Frank Miller	August 16, 1978	August 18, 1978
Treasurer and Minister of Economics	Frank Miller	August 18, 1978	July 6, 1983
Treasurer and Minister of Economics	Larry Grossman	July 6, 1983	February 8, 1985
Minister of Intergovernmental Affairs	Thomas Leonard Wells	August 18, 1978	February 8, 1985
Minister of Municipal Affairs	Dalton Bales	March 1, 1971	February 2, 1972
Minister of Municipal Affairs	Darcy McKeough	February 2, 1972	April 7, 1972
Minister of Municipal Affairs	within Intergovermental Affairs	April 7, 1972	July 3, 1981
Minister of Municipal Affairs	within Municipal Affairs and Housing	July 3, 1981	February 8, 1985
Minister without portfolio (Municipal Affairs) (Note: Attached to the Department of Treasury)	Claude Bennett	September 28, 1972	January 15, 1973
Minister without portfolio (Municipal Affairs)	Donald Irvine	February 26, 1974	October 7, 1974
Minister without portfolio (Municipal Affairs)	Richard B. Beckett	June 18, 1975	October 7, 1975
Minister of Municipal Affairs and Housing	Claude Bennett	July 3, 1981	February 8, 1985
Minister of Revenue	Eric Alfred Winkler	March 1, 1971	February 2, 1972
Minister of Revenue	Allan Grossman	February 2, 1972	February 26, 1974
Minister of Revenue	Arthur Meen	February 26, 1974	February 3, 1977
Minister of Revenue	Margaret Scrivener	February 3, 1977	January 21, 1978
Minister of Revenue	Lorne Maeck	January 21, 1978	April 10, 1981
Minister of Revenue	George Ashe	April 10, 1981	July 6, 1983
Minister of Revenue	Bud Gregory	July 6, 1983	February 8, 1985
Minister of Public Works	James Auld	March 1, 1971	February 2, 1972
Minister of Public Works	James W. Snow	February 2, 1972	April 7, 1972
Minister of Government Services	James W. Snow	April 7, 1972	October 7, 1975
Minister of Government Services	Margaret Scrivener	October 7, 1975	February 3, 1977
Minister of Government Services	John Smith	February 3, 1977	June 23, 1977
Minister of Government Services	James Auld	June 23, 1977	September 21, 1977
Minister of Government Services	George McCague	September 21, 1977	January 21, 1978
Minister of Government Services	Lorne Henderson	January 21, 1978	August 30, 1979
Minister of Government Services	Douglas Wiseman	August 30, 1979	July 6, 1983
Minister of Government Services	George Ashe	July 6, 1983	February 8, 1985
Provincial Secretary and Ministry of Citizenship (Note: eliminated 1972. There will be no portfolio with a "Citizenship" mandate again until 1982)	John Yaremko	March 1, 1971	April 7, 1972
Justice portfolios
Provincial Secretary for Justice	Allan Lawrence	January 5, 1972	September 28, 1972
Provincial Secretary for Justice	George Kerr	September 28, 1972	February 26, 1974
Provincial Secretary for Justice	Bob Welch	February 26, 1974	June 18, 1975
Provincial Secretary for Justice	John Clement	June 18, 1975	October 7, 1975
Provincial Secretary for Justice	John MacBeth	October 7, 1975	January 21, 1978
Provincial Secretary for Justice	George Kerr	January 21, 1978	August 18, 1978
Provincial Secretary for Justice	Bob Welch	August 18, 1978	August 30, 1979
Provincial Secretary for Justice	Gordon Walker	August 30, 1979	February 13, 1982
Provincial Secretary for Justice	Norman Sterling	February 13, 1982	December 23, 1983
Provincial Secretary for Justice	Gordon Walker	December 23, 1983	February 8, 1985
Minister of Justice and Attorney General	Allan Lawrence	March 1, 1971	February 2, 1972
Minister of Justice and Attorney General	Dalton Bales	February 2, 1972	April 10, 1972
Attorney General	Dalton Bales	April 10, 1972	February 26, 1974
Attorney General	Bob Welch	February 26, 1974	January 14, 1975
Attorney General	John Clement	January 14, 1975	October 7, 1975
Attorney General	Roy McMurtry	October 7, 1975	February 8, 1985
Solicitor General	John Yaremko	April 7, 1972	February 26, 1974
Solicitor General	George Kerr	February 26, 1974	June 18, 1975
Solicitor General	John Clement	June 18, 1975	October 7, 1975
Solicitor General	John MacBeth	October 7, 1975	January 21, 1978
Solicitor General	George Kerr	January 21, 1978	September 11, 1978
Solicitor General	Roy McMurtry	September 11, 1978	February 13, 1982
Solicitor General	George William Taylor	February 13, 1982	June 26, 1985
Minister of Correctional Services	Syl Apps	March 1, 1971	February 26, 1974
Minister of Correctional Services	Richard Potter	February 26, 1974	October 7, 1975
Minister of Correctional Services	John Smith	October 7, 1975	February 3, 1977
Minister of Correctional Services	Arthur Meen	February 3, 1977	June 23, 1977
Minister of Correctional Services	John MacBeth interim	June 23, 1977	September 21, 1977
Minister of Correctional Services	Frank Drea	September 21, 1977	October 18, 1978
Minister of Correctional Services	Gordon Walker	October 18, 1978	April 10, 1981
Minister of Correctional Services	Nick Leluk	April 10, 1981	February 8, 1985
Minister of Financial and Commercial Affairs	Arthur Wishart	March 1, 1971	December 8, 1971
Minister of Financial and Commercial Affairs	Gordon Carton	December 8, 1971	February 2, 1972
Minister of Financial and Commercial Affairs	Eric Winkler	February 2, 1972	April 7, 1972
Minister of Consumer and Commercial Relations (Note: named "Ministry of Financial and Commercial Affairs" from March 1, 1971 to April 10, 1972.)	Eric Winkler	April 7, 1972	September 28, 1972
Minister of Consumer and Commercial Relations	John Clement	September 28, 1972	June 18, 1975
Minister of Consumer and Commercial Relations	Sid Handleman	June 18, 1975	September 21, 1977
Minister of Consumer and Commercial Relations	Larry Grossman	September 21, 1977	October 18, 1978
Minister of Consumer and Commercial Relations	Frank Drea	October 18, 1978	April 10, 1981
Minister of Consumer and Commercial Relations	Gordon Walker	April 10, 1981	February 13, 1982
Minister of Consumer and Commercial Relations	Robert Elgie	February 13, 1982	February 8, 1985
Social development portfolios
Provincial Secretary for Social Development	Bob Welch	January 5, 1972	February 26, 1974
Provincial Secretary for Social Development	Margaret Birch	February 26, 1974	July 6, 1983
Provincial Secretary for Social Development	Bruce McCaffrey	July 6, 1983	December 23, 1983
Provincial Secretary for Social Development	Gordon Dean	December 23, 1983	February 8, 1985
Minister of Education	Bob Welch	March 1, 1971	February 2, 1972
Minister of Education	Thomas Wells	February 2, 1972	August 18, 1978
Minister of Education	Bette Stephenson	August 18, 1978	February 8, 1985
Minister of University Affairs (Note: Department renamed to Colleges and Universities)	John White	March 1, 1971	October 28, 1971
Minister of Colleges and Universities	John White	October 28, 1971	February 2, 1972
Minister of Colleges and Universities	George Kerr	February 2, 1972	September 28, 1972
Minister of Colleges and Universities	Jack McNie	September 28, 1972	February 26, 1974
Minister of Colleges and Universities	James Auld	February 26, 1974	October 7, 1975
Minister of Colleges and Universities	Harry Parrott	October 7, 1975	August 18, 1978
Minister of Colleges and Universities	Bette Stephenson	August 18, 1978	February 8, 1985
Minister of Social and Family Services	Thomas Leonard Wells	March 1, 1971	February 2, 1972
Minister of Social and Family Services	René Brunelle	February 2, 1972	April 7, 1972
Minister of Community and Social Services	René Brunelle	April 7, 1972	October 7, 1975
Minister of Community and Social Services	James A. Taylor	October 7, 1975	February 3, 1977
Minister of Community and Social Services	Keith Norton	February 3, 1977	April 10, 1981
Minister of Community and Social Services	Frank Drea	April 10, 1981	September 29, 1983
Minister of Community and Social Services	Bruce McCaffrey interim	September 29, 1983	November 21, 1983
Minister of Community and Social Services	Frank Drea	November 21, 1983	February 8, 1985
Minister Responsible for Women's Issues	Bob Welch	May 17, 1983	February 8, 1985
Minister without portfolio (Youth Secretariat)	Margaret Birch	September 28, 1972	February 26, 1974
Minister without portfolio (Youth Secretariat)	Dennis Timbrell	February 26, 1974	June 18, 1975
Minister of Health	Bert Lawrence	March 1, 1971	February 2, 1972
Minister of Health	Richard Potter	February 2, 1972	February 26, 1974
Minister of Health	Frank Miller	February 26, 1974	February 3, 1977
Minister of Health	Dennis Timbrell	February 3, 1977	February 13, 1982
Minister of Health	Larry Grossman	February 13, 1982	July 6, 1983
Minister of Health	Keith Norton	July 6, 1983	October 11, 1983
Minister of Health	Thomas Leonard Wells interim	October 11, 1983	December 5, 1983
Minister of Health	Keith Norton	December 5, 1983	February 8, 1985
Minister Responsible for Ontario Housing Corp	Allan Grossman	February 2, 1972	February 26, 1974
Minister of Housing (Note: created November 7, 1973.)	Bob Welch	November 7, 1973	February 26, 1974
Minister of Housing	Sid Handleman	February 26, 1974	October 7, 1974
Minister of Housing	Donald Irvine	October 7, 1974	October 7, 1975
Minister of Housing	John Rhodes	October 7, 1975	† January 21, 1978
Minister of Housing	Claude Bennett	January 21, 1978	July 3, 1981
Minister of Housing	within Municipal Affairs and Housing	July 3, 1981	February 8, 1985
Minister of Tourism and Information	Fernand Guindon	March 1, 1971	February 2, 1972
Minister of Tourism and Information	John White	February 2, 1972	April 7, 1972
Minister of Tourism and Information	within Industry and Tourism	April 7, 1972	February 13, 1982
Minister of Culture and Recreation	Bob Welch	January 14, 1975	August 18, 1978
Minister of Culture and Recreation	Reuben Baetz	August 18, 1978	February 13, 1982
Minister of Tourism and Recreation	Reuben Baetz	February 13, 1982	February 8, 1985
Minister of Citizenship and Culture	Bruce McCaffrey	February 13, 1982	July 6, 1983
Minister of Citizenship and Culture	Susan Fish	July 6, 1983	February 8, 1985
Resources development portfolios
Provincial Secretary for Resource Development	Bert Lawrence	January 5, 1972	February 26, 1974
Provincial Secretary for Resource Development	Allan Grossman	February 26, 1974	October 7, 1975
Provincial Secretary for Resource Development	Donald Irvine	October 7, 1975	February 3, 1977
Provincial Secretary for Resource Development	René Brunelle	February 3, 1977	April 10, 1981
Provincial Secretary for Resource Development	Russ Ramsay	April 10, 1981	February 13, 1982
Provincial Secretary for Resource Development	Lorne Henderson	February 13, 1982	July 6, 1983
Provincial Secretary for Resource Development	Norm Sterling	July 6, 1983	February 8, 1985
Minister of Agriculture and Food	William Atcheson Stewart	March 1, 1971	October 7, 1975
Minister of Agriculture and Food	Bill Newman	October 7, 1975	August 30, 1979
Minister of Agriculture and Food	Lorne Henderson	August 30, 1979	February 13, 1982
Minister of Agriculture and Food	Dennis Timbrell	February 13, 1982	February 8, 1985
Minister of Energy	Darcy McKeough	July 4, 1973	June 18, 1975
Minister of Energy	Dennis Timbrell	June 18, 1975	February 3, 1977
Minister of Energy	James A. Taylor	February 3, 1977	January 21, 1978
Minister of Energy	Reuben Baetz	January 21, 1978	August 18, 1978
Minister of Energy	James Auld	August 18, 1978	August 30, 1979
Minister of Energy	Bob Welch	August 30, 1979	July 6, 1983
Minister of Energy	Philip Andrewes	July 6, 1983	February 8, 1985
Minister of Energy and Resource Management	George Kerr	March 1, 1971	July 23, 1971
Minister of the Environment	George Kerr	July 23, 1971	February 2, 1972
Minister of the Environment	James Auld	February 2, 1972	February 26, 1974
Minister of the Environment	Bill Newman	February 26, 1974	October 7, 1975
Minister of the Environment	George Kerr	October 7, 1975	January 21, 1978
Minister of the Environment	George McCague	January 21, 1978	August 18, 1978
Minister of the Environment	Harry Craig Parrott	August 18, 1978	April 10, 1981
Minister of the Environment	Keith Norton	April 10, 1981	July 6, 1983
Minister of the Environment	Andy Brandt	July 6, 1983	February 8, 1985
Minister of Lands and Forests	René Brunelle	March 1, 1971	February 2, 1972
Minister of Lands and Forests	Leo Bernier	February 2, 1972	April 7, 1972
Minister of Natural Resources	Leo Bernier	April 7, 1972	February 3, 1977
Minister of Natural Resources	Frank Miller	February 3, 1977	August 18, 1978
Minister of Natural Resources	James Auld	August 18, 1978	April 10, 1981
Minister of Natural Resources	Alan Pope	April 10, 1981	February 8, 1985
Minister of Mines and Northern Affairs	Leo Bernier	March 1, 1971	April 7, 1972
Minister of Northern Affairs (Note: named "Ministry of Mines and Northern Affairs" from March 1, 1971 to 1972; then I think it merges with Natural Resources till 1977; then it is Mines and Northern Affairs 1977-1985)	Leo Bernier	February 3, 1977	February 8, 1985
Minister of Highways & Minister of Transport	Charles MacNaughton	March 1, 1971	May 28, 1971
Minister of Transportation and Communications	Charles MacNaughton	May 28, 1971	February 2, 1972
Minister of Transportation and Communications	Gordon Carton	February 2, 1972	February 26, 1974
Minister of Transportation and Communications	John Rhodes	February 26, 1974	October 7, 1975
Minister of Transportation and Communications	James W. Snow	October 7, 1975	February 8, 1985
Minister of Trade and Development	Allan Grossman	March 1, 1971	February 2, 1972
Minister of Trade and Development	John White	February 2, 1972	April 7, 1972
Minister of Industry and Tourism	John White	April 7, 1972	January 15, 1973
Minister of Industry and Tourism	Claude Bennett	January 15, 1973	January 21, 1978
Minister of Industry and Tourism	John Rhodes	January 21, 1978	† September 25, 1978
Minister of Industry and Tourism	vacant	September 25, 1978	October 18, 1978
Minister of Industry and Tourism	Larry Grossman	October 18, 1978	February 13, 1982
Minister of Industry and Trade Development	Gordon Walker	February 13, 1982	July 6, 1983
Minister of Industry and Trade	Frank Miller	July 6, 1983	February 8, 1985
Minister of Labour	Gordon Carton	March 1, 1971	February 2, 1972
Minister of Labour	Fernand Guindon	February 2, 1972	May 31, 1974
Minister of Labour	John MacBeth	May 31, 1974	October 7, 1975
Minister of Labour	Bette Stephenson	October 7, 1975	August 18, 1978
Minister of Labour	Robert Elgie	August 18, 1978	February 13, 1982
Minister of Labour	Russ Ramsay	February 13, 1982	February 8, 1985
Other mon-portfolio assignments & ministers without portfolio
House Leader	Thomas Leonard Wells	December 23, 1983	February 8, 1985
Ministers Without Portfolios (Chair of Cabinet)	John White	June 18, 1975	October 7, 1975
Ministers Without Portfolios (Chair of Cabinet)	René Brunelle	October 7, 1975	February 3, 1977
Ministers Without Portfolios (Chief Whip) (Note: The first chief whip during Davis' premiership, Alex Carruthers, was not appointed a minister without portfolio)	Bud Gregory	April 10, 1981	July 6, 1983
Ministers Without Portfolios (Chief Whip)	Robert G. Eaton	July 6, 1983	February 8, 1985
Ministers Without Portfolios (Regulations)	Gordon Dean	July 6, 1983	December 23, 1983
Ministers Without Portfolios	Edward Arunah Dunlop Jr.	March 1, 1971	October 28, 1971
Ministers Without Portfolios	Richard Potter	March 1, 1971	February 2, 1972
Ministers Without Portfolios	James W. Snow	March 1, 1971	February 2, 1972
Ministers Without Portfolios	Jack McNie	February 26, 1974	October 7, 1975
Ministers Without Portfolios	Sid Handleman	October 7, 1974	June 18, 1975
Ministers Without Portfolios	Lorne Henderson	October 7, 1975	January 21, 1978
Ministers Without Portfolios	Douglas Wiseman	January 21, 1978	August 30, 1979
Ministers Without Portfolios	Alan Pope	August 30, 1979	April 10, 1981
Ministers Without Portfolios	Bud Gregory	August 29, 1979	April 10, 1981
Ministers Without Portfolios	Norm Sterling	April 10, 1981	February 13, 1982
Ministers Without Portfolios	Bruce McCaffrey	April 10, 1981	February 13, 1982
Ministers Without Portfolios	Robert G. Eaton	February 13, 1982	July 6, 1983
