= Robarts ministry =

Cabinet of Ontario, 1961–1971

- 17th ministry of Ontario

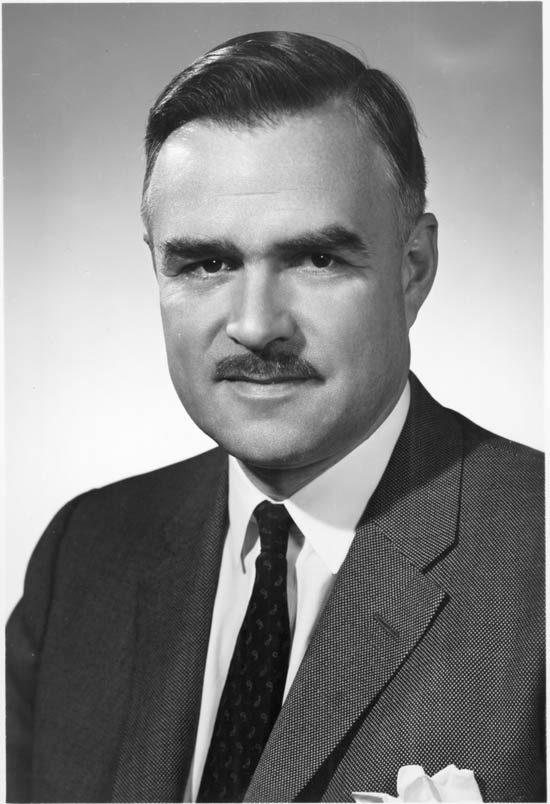
- Premier John Robarts in 1960
- Date formed: November 8, 1961
- Date dissolved: March 1, 1971

People and organisations
- Monarch: Elizabeth II
- Lieutenant Governor: John Keiller MacKay (1961-1963); William Earl Rowe (1963-1968); William Ross Macdonald (1968-1971)
- Premier: John Robarts
- Member party: PC Party
- Status in legislature: Majority (1961-1971)
- Opposition party: Liberal, Ontario New Democratic Party
- Opposition leader: John Wintermeyer (1961-1963); Farquhar Oliver (1963-1964); Andy Thompson (1964-1966); Robert Nixon (Liberal, 1967-1971)

History
- Elections: 1963, 1967
- Legislature term: 26th Parliament of Ontario 27th Parliament of Ontario 28th Parliament of Ontario
- Incoming formation: 1961 PC leadership convention
- Outgoing formation: resignation
- Predecessor: Frost ministry
- Successor: Davis ministry

The Robarts Ministry was the combined cabinet (formally the Executive Council of Ontario) that governed Ontario from November 8, 1961, to March 1, 1971. It was led by the 17th Premier of Ontario, John Robarts. The ministry was made up of members of the Progressive Conservative Party of Ontario, which commanded a majority of the seats in the Legislative Assembly of Ontario throughout its duration.

The ministry replaced the Frost ministry following the resignation of Premier Leslie Frost and the 1961 PC leadership convention. The Robarts ministry governed through the second half of the 26th Parliament of Ontario, the entirety of the 27th Parliament of Ontario, and most of the 28th Parliament of Ontario.

Robarts resigned in 1971 and was succeeded as Premier of Ontario by Bill Davis.

== List of ministers ==
Robarts ministry by portfolio
Portfolio	Minister	Tenure	
Portfolio	Minister	Start	End
Premier of Ontario	John Robarts	November 8, 1961	March 1, 1971
Chair of the Treasury Board	James Allan	December 15, 1961	November 24, 1966
Chair of the Treasury Board	Charles MacNaughton	November 24, 1966	March 1, 1971
Minister of Agriculture and Food (Note: named "Minister of Agriculture" from November 8, 1961 to May 18, 1966.)	William Atcheson; Stewart	November 8, 1961	March 1, 1971
Minister of Justice and Attorney General (Note: named "Attorney General" from November 8, 1961 to May 18, 1966.)	Kelso Roberts	November 8, 1961	October 25, 1962
Minister of Justice and Attorney General	Fred Cass	October 25, 1962	March 23, 1964
Minister of Justice and Attorney General	Arthur Wishart	March 23, 1964	March 1, 1971
Minister of Tourism and Information (Note: named "Ministry of Travel and Publicity" from November 8, 1961 to March 25, 1964.)	Bryan Lewis Cathcart	November 8, 1961	August 14, 1963
Minister of Tourism and Information	James Auld	August 14, 1963	March 1, 1971
Minister of University Affairs (Note: created May 14, 1964.)	Bill Davis	May 14, 1964	March 1, 1971
Minister of Social and Family Services (Note: named "Ministry of Public Welfare" from November 8, 1961 to March 22, 1967.)	Louis-Pierre Cécile	November 8, 1961	November 24, 1966
Minister of Social and Family Services	John Yaremko	November 24, 1966	March 1, 1971
Ministry of Financial and Commercial Affairs (Note: created November 24, 1966.)	Leslie Rowntree	November 24, 1966	February 5, 1970
Ministry of Financial and Commercial Affairs	Bert Lawrence	February 5, 1970	March 1, 1971
Minister of Correctional Services (Note: named "Ministry of Reform Institutions" from November 8, 1961 to July 1, 1968.)	Irwin Haskett	November 8, 1961	August 14, 1963
Minister of Correctional Services	Allan Grossman	August 14, 1963	March 1, 1971
Minister of Education	John Robarts	November 8, 1961	October 25, 1962
Minister of Education	Bill Davis	October 25, 1962	March 1, 1971
Minister of Energy (Note: named "Ministry of Energy Resources" from November 8, 1961 to March 26, 1964.)	Robert Macaulay	November 8, 1961	October 16, 1963
Minister of Energy	John Richard Simonett	October 16, 1963	June 5, 1969
Minister of Energy	George Kerr	June 5, 1969	March 1, 1971
Treasurer and Minister of Economics (Note: named "Minister of Economics and Federal and Provincial Relations" November 8, 1961 from December 15, 1961.) (Note: named "Treasurer" from November 8, 1961 to July 23, 1968.)	James Allan	November 8, 1961	November 24, 1966
Treasurer and Minister of Economics	Charles MacNaughton	November 24, 1966	March 1, 1971
Ministry of Highways	William Goodfellow	November 8, 1961	October 25, 1962
Ministry of Highways	Charles MacNaughton	October 25, 1962	November 24, 1966
Ministry of Highways	George Gomme	November 24, 1966	March 1, 1971
Minister of Public Works	Ray Connell	November 8, 1961	June 5, 1969
Minister of Public Works	Jack Simonett	June 5, 1969	March 1, 1971
Minister of Health	Matthew Dymond	November 8, 1961	August 13, 1969
Minister of Health	Thomas Leonard Wells	August 13, 1969	March 1, 1971
Minister of Trade and Development (Note: named "Commerce and Development" November 8, 1961 from December 15, 1961.) (Note: named "Economics and Development" from December 15, 1961 to April 11, 1968.)	James Allan	November 8, 1961	November 24, 1966
Minister of Trade and Development	Charles MacNaughton	November 24, 1966	March 1, 1971
Minister of Labour	Bill Warrender	November 8, 1961	October 25, 1962
Minister of Labour	Leslie Rowntree	October 25, 1962	November 24, 1966
Minister of Labour	Dalton Bales	November 24, 1966	March 1, 1971
Minister of Municipal Affairs	Fred Cass	November 8, 1961	October 25, 1962
Minister of Municipal Affairs	Wilf Spooner	October 25, 1962	November 23, 1967
Minister of Municipal Affairs	Darcy McKeough	November 23, 1967	March 1, 1971
Minister of Lands and Forests	Wilf Spooner	November 8, 1961	October 25, 1962
Minister of Lands and Forests	Kelso Roberts	October 25, 1962	November 24, 1966
Minister of Lands and Forests	René Brunelle	November 24, 1966	March 1, 1971
Minister of Mines and Northern Affairs (Note: named "Ministry of Mines" from November 8, 1961 June 26, 1970.)	George Wardrope	November 8, 1961	November 23, 1967
Minister of Mines and Northern Affairs	Allan Lawrence	November 23, 1967	March 1, 1971
Minister of Revenue	Charles MacNaughton	July 23, 1968	October 10, 1968
Minister of Revenue	John White	October 10, 1968	March 1, 1971
Minister of Transport	Leslie Rowntree	November 8, 1961	October 25, 1962
Minister of Transport	James Auld	October 25, 1962	August 14, 1963
Minister of Transport	Irwin Haskett	August 14, 1963	March 1, 1971
Ministers; Without Portfolios	Fernand Guindon	November 23, 1967	March 1, 1971
Provincial Secretary and Minister of Citizenship	John Yaremko	November 8, 1961	November 24, 1966
Provincial Secretary and Minister of Citizenship	Robert Stanley Welch	November 24, 1966	March 1, 1971
