= Allan Grossman =

Canadian politician

Ontario MPP
- In office 1967–1975
- Preceded by: New riding
- Succeeded by: Larry Grossman
- Constituency: St. Andrew—St. Patrick
- In office 1955–1967
- Preceded by: Joseph Salsberg
- Succeeded by: Riding abolished
- Constituency: St. Andrew

Personal details
- Born: December 25, 1910 Toronto, Ontario
- Died: September 1, 1991 (aged 80) Toronto, Ontario
- Resting place: Beth Tzedec Memorial Park
- Party: Progressive Conservative
- Spouse: Ethel Starkman
- Children: 3, including Larry Grossman
- Occupation: Insurance agent

Allan Grossman (December 25, 1910 – September 1, 1991) was a member of the Legislative Assembly of Ontario, Canada, for 20 years, a provincial cabinet minister and the father of the late former leader of the Ontario Progressive Conservative Party, Larry Grossman. Together, the father and son represented the downtown Toronto, Ontario, riding of St. Andrew, and its successor St. Andrew—St. Patrick, for 32 consecutive years. Allan was also the second Jewish Canadian Cabinet minister in Ontario, after David Croll, and the first to be a Tory. He was also the first elected Canadian official to visit China.

== Background ==
Grossman's father, Moishe, had left Russian occupied Poland in 1907. Two years later, Moishe Grossman brought his wife Sarah and their then six children to Canada. Allan Grossman was the seventh child and the first member of the family to be born in Canada.

At age sixteen Grossman and a handful of other boys formed the "Junior Conservative Association of Toronto". Probably the first Toronto political organization for youths, it was the beginning of the "Young Progressive Conservatives."

== Political life ==
Grossman became a successful businessman and organized his fellow insurance agents into a union to fight the entry into Canada of an allegedly communist-dominated union from the United States. He was president of Allan Grossman Insurance Services Ltd.

In 1951, former Toronto mayor, Nathan Phillips, then an alderman, was vacating his council seat to run for mayor. He persuaded Grossman to run in his ward against the Labor-Progressive Party (as the Communists were known) candidate who had narrowly been defeated during the previous year's election. Grossman ran and defeated the Communist candidate by a margin of 131 votes. The following year he won by 2,000 votes and became the senior alderman and one of the founding members of the Metropolitan Toronto Council. He was re-elected alderman in the subsequent two annual elections.

In 1955, he ran provincially as the Progressive Conservative candidate against the Labor-Progressive Party incumbent J. B. Salsberg for the downtown Toronto riding of St. Andrew. Grossman won, defeating the last Communist in the Ontario legislature.

In 1960, Ontario Premier Leslie Frost appointed Grossman to the Cabinet as Minister Without Portfolio, becoming the first Jewish cabinet minister in Ontario since David Croll. Grossman went on to serve under Premier John Robarts as Chief Liquor Commissioner and Minister of Reform Institutions (now Correctional Services). During his nearly eight years as minister Grossman became renowned throughout North America and Europe for his innovative and progressive penal reforms. His leadership was recognized with numerous citations, and in 1971 the University of Ottawa bestowed upon him with an honorary doctorate in Criminology.

In 1971, Grossman was appointed by Robarts successor, Bill Davis. as Minister of Trade and Development, with additional responsibility for Housing. He led the first trade mission from the Western world to China.

Grossman became Minister of Revenue in 1972 and continued his responsibility for housing. He introduced Ontario's tax credit program to assist the elderly and low income families and eliminated much of the red tape that generally plagues a tax-collecting Ministry. In 1974, Grossman became the Provincial Secretary for Resources Development with overall policy responsibility for seven ministries.

Outside politics Grossman fought to help the Hungarian freedom fighters and their Canadian relatives; the citizens of Prague who cried for freedom during the Russian invasion; and, as President of the Jewish Immigrant Aid Service, he assisted homeless persons.

=== Cabinet posts ===
Davis ministry, Province of Ontario (1971–1985)
Cabinet posts (3)
Predecessor	Office	Successor
Bert Lawrence	Provincial Secretary for Resources Development; 1974-1975	Donald Irvine
Eric Winkler	Minister of Revenue; 1972-1974	Arthur Meen
Stan Randall	Minister of Trade and Development; 1971-1972	John White
Robarts ministry, Province of Ontario (1961–1971)
Cabinet post (1)
Predecessor	Office	Successor
Irwin Haskett	Minister of Correctional Services (Note: From 1963 to 1968 was known as Minister of Reform Institutions.); 1963-1971	Syl Apps
Frost ministry, Province of Ontario (1949–1961)
Sub-Cabinet Post
Predecessor	Title	Successor
	Minister without portfolio (1960-1963)	

=== Fire rescue ===
While Grossman was campaigning for reelection in 1967, he saw a man whose clothes were on fire. The man had been working on his car and the clothes were greasy. He was saved when Grossman and a police constable used their coats to smother the flames.

== After politics ==
After retiring from public life in 1975, Allan Grossman served as chairman of the Criminal Injuries Compensation Board (Canada) until 1984 and he worked on his son's campaigns for the Ontario PC leadership in 1985 and afterwards served as a volunteer advisor to Larry and the Ontario Tory caucus.

In 1985, a biography was published, Unlikely Tory: The Life and Politics of Allan Grossman by Peter Oliver ISBN 0-88619-049-5.

== Death ==
Grossman died on September 1, 1991, of cancer in Toronto's Sunnybrook Health Center; he was 80 years old.
