= Deputy Premier of Ontario =

- Vice-première ministre de l'Ontario
- Coat of arms of Ontario

- Flag of Ontario

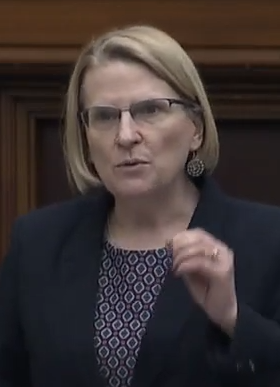
- Incumbent; Sylvia Jones since June 24, 2022
- Style: The Honourable
- Appointer: The lieutenant governor on the advice of the premier
- Term length: At pleasure
- Inaugural holder: Bob Welch
- Formation: September 21, 1977 (48 years ago)
- Salary: $232,340 (2026)

The deputy premier of Ontario (French: vice-première ministre de l'Ontario) is a position in the cabinet of the Government of Ontario (formally the Executive Council of Ontario) that is conferred from time to time upon a cabinet member to signal heightened precedence at the discretion of the Premier. The incumbent Deputy Premier, Sylvia Jones, was appointed to the role on June 24, 2022. She has also been the province's Minister of Health since that date, the fourth person to hold the health portfolio while deputy premier.

The position of deputy premier is not associated with any departmental portfolio or any formal duty. While every Deputy Premier had held at least one portfolio, there is no legal requirement for them to be so. Any specific ministerial responsibilities or standing authorities must be specifically assigned by the Premier. Deputy premiers had been assigned in the past responsibilities over policy areas (such as women issues, poverty reduction) and functional responsibilities (such as chairing cabinet meeting). They have also been designated as acting premier with varying degree and scope of formal authority during extended planned absence of the Premier (such as vacations or oversea missions).

As a member of the executive council, deputy premiers are entitled to be styled as the Honourable, a privilege maintained for life. Between 1981 and 2008, the position was explicitly recognized by the Executive Council Act, conferring the incumbent with legal standing and salary entitlement as a portfolio minister whether they actually headed a ministry or not.

The deputy premier does not have any automatic right of succession or any entitlement to exercise any authorities associated with the Office of the Premier should the office become temporarily vacant. It is however routine practice for the Premier to designated the deputy premier, if there is one designated, as the minister to exercised the duties and power associated with the office of the Premier in their unexpected absence or inability to act.

== History ==
Ontario Premiers had publicly named cabinet members as their designated deputy since at early as the early 1900s. Such designation were needed not just for emergencies, but for routine planned absence of the first minister due to transportation and telecommunications being substantially less developed.

For much of his premiership, James Whitney designated Attorney General J.J. Foy, long a personal confidant, as the designated deputy and acting premier whenever he was ill or away from the provincial capital. In the final year of his premiership however, education minister Robert Allan Pyne replaced Foy as the designated deputy as Foy himself was often in ill health, and acted as premier upon Whitney death.

Similarly, Howard Ferguson designated public works minister George Henry as deputy throughout his premiership. Upon Ferguson's appointment as High Commissioner in London, Henry succeeded Ferguson as party leader and premier without competing in a leadership contest. He was however unable to win an electoral mandate, losing the 1934 election to the Liberals led by Mitch Hepburn.

After not having a single designated deputy in the first six years of his premiership (instead had four "super-ministers" each overseeing a group of ministries), Bill Davis formally named Bob Welch as Deputy Premier. Unlike previous designations, which were publicly announced but were not formally endorsed in any official instrument or stated in any formal documents, Welch was formally sworn in and listed in official documents as deputy premier. The position was further given formal legal standing when the Executive Council Act was amended in 1981 for its inclusion as a ministerial portfolio.

== Notable facts ==
To date, every deputy premier of Ontario has also concurrently held at least one other ministerial portfolio with immense power or budget. The portfolio most often held by the deputy premiers was the finance/treasury portfolio, having been held by six deputy premiers: Bette Stephenson (PC, Miller), Robert Nixon (Lib, Peterson), Floyd Laughren (NDP, Rae), Ernie Eves (PC, Harris), Jim Flaherty (PC, Harris), and Dwight Duncan (Lib, McGuinty), plus Deb Matthews (Lib, Wynne) who was treasury board president but not finance minister. As health services increasingly becomes the dominant expense line in the government budget in recent years, the portfolio had been held by four deputy premiers just in the past two decades: George Smitherman (Lib, McGuinty), Deb Matthews (Lib, Wynne), Christine Elliott (PC, Ford), Sylvia Jones (PC, Ford).

In addition to George Henry, two other deputy premiers went on to become premier: Harry Nixon (Lib, Hepburn) and Ernie Eves (PC, Harris), who secured the premiership by defeating his successor as deputy premier Jim Flaherty in the 2002 Progressive Conservative leadership election. All three led their party and ministry to electoral defeat however.

Christine Elliott, deputy premier from 2018 to 2022, was widow of Jim Flaherty, deputy premier from 2001 to 2002.

== List of deputy premiers ==
| Name | Term of office | | Tenure | Ministry Party | Note |
Designated as deputy premier
| James Joseph Foy | c. 1905 | c. 1913 | | Whitney (Conservative) | While Attorney General |
| Robert Allan Pyne | c. 1913 | c. 1914 | | Whitney (Conservative) | While Minister of Education |
| George Stewart Henry | July 16, 1923 | December 15, 1930 | 7 years, 152 days | Ferguson (Conservative) | While Minister of Public Works & Minister of Highways |
| Harry Nixon | July 10, 1934 | c. 1942 | | Hepburn (Liberal) | While Provincial Secretary |
| Farquhar Oliver | May 18, 1943 | August 17, 1943 | 91 days | Nixon (Liberal) | While Minister of Public Works and Minister of Public Welfare |
| George Doucett | July 10, 1934 | c. 1942 | | Frost (Conservative) | While Minister of Public Works & Minister of Highways |
Formally appointed deputy premier
| Bob Welch | Sep 21, 1977 | February 8, 1985 | 7 years, 238 days | Davis (PC) | While Attorney General, Provincial Secretary for Justice, Minister of Culture and Recreation (1977–78), Minister of Energy (1979–83) & Minister Responsible for Women's Issues (1983–85) |
| Bob Welch | February 8, 1985 | May 17, 1985 | 7 years, 238 days | Miller (PC) | While Attorney General |
| Bette Stephenson | May 17, 1985 | June 26, 1985 | 40 days | Miller (PC) | While Treasurer & Chair of the Management Board of Cabinet |
| none designated | June 26, 1985 | Sep 29, 1987 | | Peterson (Liberal) | |
| Robert Nixon | Sep 29, 1987 | October 1, 1990 | 3 years, 2 days | Peterson (Liberal) | While Treasurer, Minister of Economics and Minister of Financial Institutions |
| Floyd Laughren | October 1, 1990 | June 26, 1995 | 4 years, 268 days | Rae (NDP) | While Minister of Economics and Treasurer (1990–93) & Minister of Finance (1993-95) |
| Ernie Eves | June 26, 1995 | February 8, 2001 | 5 years, 227 days | Harris (PC) | While Minister of Finance |
| Jim Flaherty | February 8, 2001 | April 14, 2002 | 1 year, 65 days | Harris (PC) | While Minister of Finance |
| Elizabeth Witmer | April 15, 2002 | October 22, 2003 | 1 year, 190 days | Eves (PC) | While Minister of Education |
| none designated | October 23, 2003 | Sep 20, 2006 | | McGuinty (Liberal) | |
| George Smitherman | Sep 21, 2006 | Nov 9, 2009 | 2 years, 352 days | McGuinty (Liberal) | While Minister of Health and Long-Term Care (2006–08) & Minister of Energy and Infrastructure (2008–09) |
| none designated | Sep 9, 2009 | October 19, 2011 | | McGuinty (Liberal) | |
| Dwight Duncan | October 20, 2011 | Feb 11, 2013 | 1 year, 114 days | McGuinty (Liberal) | While Minister of Finance & Chair of the Management Board of Cabinet |
| Deb Matthews | February 11, 2013 | January 17, 2018 | 4 years, 340 days | Wynne (Liberal) | While Minister of Health and Long-Term Care (2013–14), President of the Treasury Board (2014–16) & Minister of Advanced Education and Skills Development (2016–18) |
| none designated | January 17, 2018 | June 29, 2018 | | Wynne (Liberal) | |
| Christine Elliott | June 29, 2018 | June 24, 2022 | 3 years, 360 days | Ford (PC) | While Minister of Health/Health and Long-Term Care |
| Sylvia Jones | June 24, 2022 | Present | 4 years, 75 days | Ford (PC) | While Minister of Health |

== See also ==
- Deputy premier (Canada)
- List of Ontario premiers
- Politics of Ontario
- Premier (Canada)
