= Ministry of Labour (Ontario) =

Canadian provincial ministry

Ministry of Labour, Immigration, Training and Skills Development
- French: Ministère du Travail, de l’Immigration, de la Formation et du Développement des compétences
- Government of Ontario wordmark

Ministry overview
- Formed: 1919
- Jurisdiction: Government of Ontario
- Headquarters: 400 University Avenue, Toronto, Ontario, Canada
- Ministers responsible: David Piccini, Minister of Labour, Immigration, Training and Skills Development; Deepak Anand, Parliamentary Assistant to the Minister of Labour, Immigration, Training and Skills Development
- Website: www.ontario.ca/labour

The Ministry of Labour, Immigration, Training and Skills Development is responsible for labour issues in the Canadian province of Ontario.

The Ministry of Labour, Immigration, Training and Skills Development and its agencies are responsible for employment equity and rights, occupational health and safety, labour relations, and supporting apprenticeships, the skilled trades, and industry training. The ministry's three program responsibilities are delivered from a head office in Toronto and 19 offices organized around four regions, centred in Ottawa, Hamilton, Sudbury and Toronto. As well, the ministry oversees the work of eight specialized agencies.

The current minister of labour, immigration, training and skills development is David Piccini.

== History ==
The Province entered the field in 1882 with the creation of the Bureau of Industries, which was attached to the Department of the Commissioner of Agriculture. In 1900, it was transferred to the Department of the Commissioner of Public Works and renamed as the Bureau of Labour, which subsequently became the Trades and Labour Branch in 1916.

In 1919, the Conservative government of William Howard Hearst secured passage of an Act to raise the Branch into a Cabinet-level department to be known as the Department of Labour. Finlay MacDiarmid, the Minister of Public Works, was appointed the first Minister of Labour as well, but the first full-time minister was Walter Rollo of the Independent Labour Party in the government of E.C. Drury that took office after the Conservative defeat in the 1919 general election.

In 1972, as part of a general reorganization of departments initiated by the government of Bill Davis, the department was renamed the Ministry of Labour.

In 2019, the Ministry of Labour changed its name to Ministry of Labour, Training and Skills Development to reflect its expanding mandate of training, apprenticeships and Employment Ontario.

Following the 2022 provincial election, the ministry was renamed to Ministry of Labour, Immigration, Training and Skills Development.

== List of ministers ==
	Portrait	Name	Term of office		Tenure	Political party (Ministry)	Note
	Minister of Labour					United Farmers (Drury)	
1		Walter Rollo	November 14, 1919	July 16, 1923	3 years, 244 days	United Farmers (Drury)	
2		Forbes Godfrey	July 16, 1923	December 15, 1930	7 years, 152 days	Conservative (Ferguson)	
3		Joseph Monteith	December 15, 1930	January 2, 1934	3 years, 18 days	Conservative (Henry)	
4		John Robb	January 2, 1934	July 10, 1934	189 days	Conservative (Henry)	
5		???	July 10, 1934	May 21, 1935	315 days	Liberal (Hepburn)	
6		David Croll	May 21, 1935	April 14, 1937	1 year, 329 days	Liberal (Hepburn)	
7		Mitch Hepburn interim	April 14, 1937	October 12, 1937	181 days	Liberal (Hepburn)	
8		Morrison MacBride	October 12, 1937???	September 2, 1938	325 days	Liberal (Hepburn)	
9		Norman Hipel	September 2, 1938	May 27, 1941	2 years, 267 days	Liberal (Hepburn)	
10		Peter Heenan	May 27, 1941	October 21, 1942	1 year, 147 days	Liberal (Hepburn)	
11		Peter Heenan	October 21, 1942	May 18, 1943	209 days	Liberal (Conant)	
12		Peter Heenan	May 18, 1943	August 17, 1943	91 days	Liberal (Nixon)	
13		Charles Daley	August 17, 1943	October 19, 1948	18 years, 83 days	PC (Drew)	
13		Charles Daley	October 19, 1948	May 4, 1949	18 years, 83 days	PC (Kennedy)	
13		Charles Daley	May 4, 1949	November 8, 1961	18 years, 83 days	PC (Frost)	
14		Bill Warrender	November 8, 1961	October 25, 1962	351 days	PC (Robarts)	
15		Leslie Rowntree	October 25, 1962	November 24, 1966	4 years, 30 days	PC (Robarts)	
16		Dalton Bales	November 24, 1966	March 1, 1971	4 years, 97 days	PC (Robarts)	
17		Gordon Carton	March 1, 1971	February 2, 1972	338 days	PC (Davis)	
18		Fernand Guindon	February 2, 1972	May 31, 1974	2 years, 118 days	PC (Davis)	
19		John MacBeth	May 31, 1974	October 7, 1975	1 year, 129 days	PC (Davis)	
20		Bette Stephenson	October 7, 1975	August 18, 1978	2 years, 315 days	PC (Davis)	
21		Robert Elgie	August 18, 1978	February 13, 1982	3 years, 179 days	PC (Davis)	
22		Russ Ramsay	February 13, 1982	February 8, 1985	3 years, 77 days	PC (Davis)	
23		Russ Ramsay	February 8, 1985	May 17, 1985	3 years, 77 days	PC (Miller)	
24		Robert Elgie	May 17, 1985	June 26, 1985	40 days	PC (Miller)	
25		Bill Wrye	June 26, 1985	September 9, 1987	2 years, 75 days	Liberal (Peterson)	
26		Greg Sorbara	September 9, 1987	August 2, 1989	1 year, 327 days	Liberal (Peterson)	
27		Gerry Phillips	August 2, 1989	September 9, 1987	1 year, 60 days	Liberal (Peterson)	
31		Bob Mackenzie	October 1, 1990	October 20, 1994	4 years, 19 days	NDP (Rae)	
32		Shirley Coppen	October 20, 1994	June 26, 1995	249 days	NDP (Rae)	
33		Elizabeth Witmer	June 26, 1995	October 10, 1997	2 years, 106 days	PC (Harris)	
34		Jim Flaherty	October 10, 1997	October 10, 1999	2 years, 0 days	PC (Harris)	
35		Chris Stockwell	October 10, 1999	April 15, 2002	2 years, 187 days	PC (Harris)	
36		Brad Clark	April 15, 2002	October 22, 2003	1 year, 190 days	PC (Eves)	
37		Chris Bentley	October 23, 2003	June 29, 2005	1 year, 249 days	Liberal (McGuinty)	
38		Steve Peters	June 29, 2005	October 30, 2007	2 years, 123 days	Liberal (McGuinty)	
39		Brad Duguid	October 30, 2007	September 18, 2008	18 years, 26 days	Liberal (McGuinty)	
40		Peter Fonseca	September 18, 2008	December 16, 2010	2 years, 89 days	Liberal (McGuinty)	
41		Charles Sousa	December 16, 2010	October 20, 2011	308 days	Liberal (McGuinty)	
42		Linda Jeffrey	October 20, 2011	February 11, 2013	1 year, 114 days	Liberal (McGuinty)	
43		Yasir Naqvi	February 11, 2013	March 25, 2014	1 year, 42 days	Liberal (Wynne)	
44		Kevin Flynn	March 25, 2014	June 29, 2018	4 years, 96 days	Liberal (Wynne)	
45		Laurie Scott	June 29, 2018	June 20, 2019	356 days	PC (Ford)	
46		Monte McNaughton	June 20, 2019	October 21, 2019	123 days	PC (Ford)	
	Minister of Labour, Training and Skills Development					PC (Ford)	
1		Monte McNaughton	October 21, 2019	June 24, 2022	2 years, 246 days	PC (Ford)	
	Minister of Labour, Immigration, Training and Skills Development					PC (Ford)	
1		Monte McNaughton	June 24, 2022	September 22, 2023	1 year, 90 days	PC (Ford)	
2		David Piccini	September 22, 2023	present	3 years, 22 days	PC (Ford)	
