= Bette Stephenson =

Canadian medical doctor and politician (1924–2019)

Bette Stephenson OC OOnt
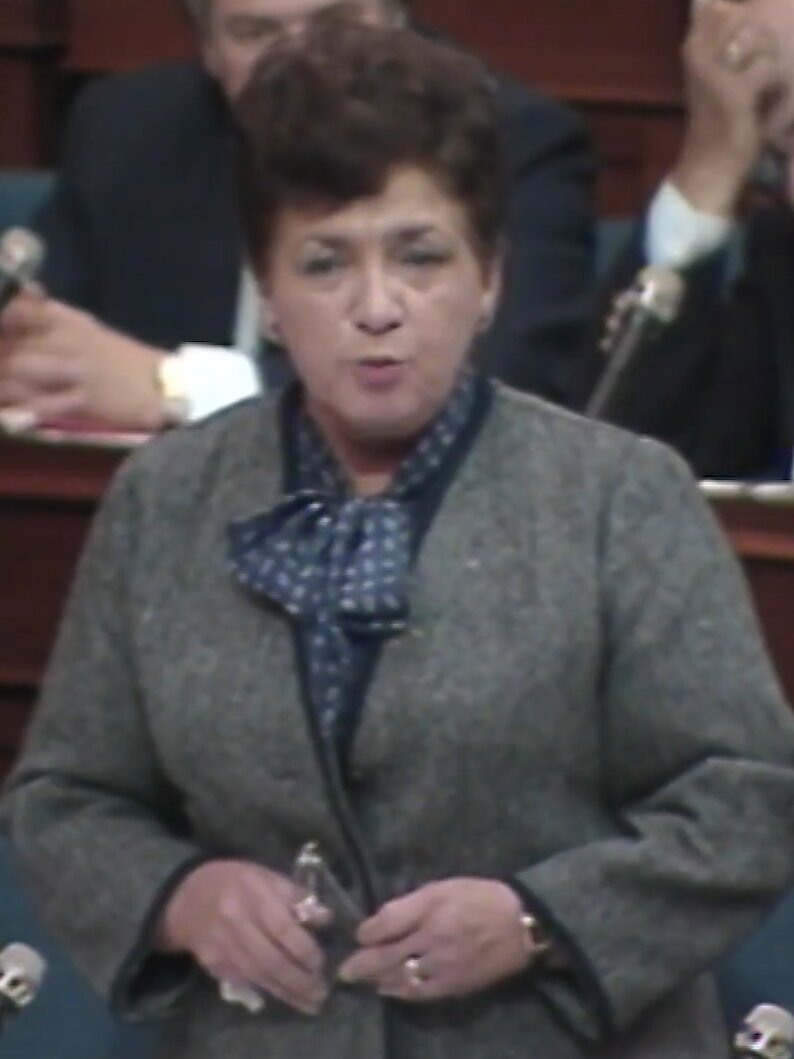
- Stephenson in 1986

2nd Deputy Premier of Ontario
- In office May 17, 1985 – June 26, 1985
- Premier: Frank Miller
- Preceded by: Bob Welch
- Succeeded by: Robert Nixon (1987)

Ontario MPP
- In office 1975–1987
- Preceded by: Dalton Bales
- Succeeded by: Brad Nixon
- Constituency: York Mills

Personal details
- Born: Bette Mildred Stephenson; July 31, 1924 Aurora, Ontario, Canada
- Died: August 19, 2019 (aged 95) Richmond Hill, Ontario, Canada
- Party: Progressive Conservative
- Spouse: G. Allan Pengelly (m. 1948; died 2013)
- Children: 6
- Education: University of Toronto
- Profession: Physician

Bette Mildred Stephenson Pengelly OC OOnt (July 31, 1924 – August 19, 2019) was a Canadian medical doctor and politician in Ontario. She served in the Legislative Assembly of Ontario from 1975 to 1987 and was a cabinet minister in the Progressive Conservative governments of Bill Davis and Frank Miller.

== Background ==
Stephenson was born in Aurora, Ontario, the daughter of Clara Mildred (Draper) and Carl Melvin Stephenson. She graduated from Earl Haig Secondary School in North York, Ontario in 1941 and was the only female in her class to go on to university. She entered University of Toronto Medical School at the age of 17, a year younger than what was then the minimum age for admission, after persuading the dean to waive both the rule and the $680 tuition fee.

She attained her medical degree from the University of Toronto in 1946. Stephenson practised medicine for more than 40 years. She was a member of the medical staff, a Director of the Outpatient Department, and Chief of the Department of General Practice at Women's College Hospital. She was also a member of the medical staff at North York General Hospital.

She was a founding member of the College of General Practice in Canada, now known as the College of Family Physicians of Canada. She was also the first female member of the board of directors of the Ontario Medical Association and the Canadian Medical Association, and served as the first female president of both organizations. In 1974, she released a report stating that there were too many foreign-born students at the University of Toronto, particularly from China. The statements she made led some Chinese physicians to create the Federation of Chinese Canadian Professionals of Ontario which later became the Chinese Canadian Medical Society.

On behalf of the CMA, she lobbied then-Justice Minister Pierre Trudeau to remove abortion from the Criminal Code. According to Stephenson, he agreed to do so but then reneged and instead introduced amendments to the Criminal Code that provided for abortions only when the health of the woman was in danger as determined by a three-doctor hospital committee.

== Politics ==
Stephenson was elected to the Legislative Assembly of Ontario in the 1975 provincial election, representing the constituency of York Mills in North York. She was appointed to Bill Davis' cabinet as Minister of Labour on October 7, 1975. She won a convincing re-election victory over Liberal candidate Wilfred Caplan in the 1977 election.

On August 18, 1978, she was named Minister of Education and Minister of Colleges and Universities. As Minister, she ordered Toronto schools to use the Lord's Prayer during opening or closing exercise instead of silent meditation. She was returned to the legislature with the largest majority of her career in the 1981 provincial election.

Stephenson was a driving force behind the ICON computer project, in which a thin client networked computer was designed and built to Ontario specifications for classroom use. Introduced in 1984, the ICON was controversial and was eventually orphaned with support discontinued in 1994.

Stephenson was not informed of Davis's decision in 1984 to extend full funding to Catholic high schools until the policy had already been decided, and was privately opposed but did not resign from cabinet in protest due to her loyalty to Davis.

The Progressive Conservatives under Davis was considered a Red Tory party, however, Stephenson was on the party's conservative wing. She considered running to succeed Davis at the January 1985 PC Party of Ontario leadership convention but did not want to split the vote with fellow right-winger Frank Miller who was also considering running, so the two agreed that only one of them would run. When Miller decided to announce his candidacy, Stephenson supported him prominently.

When Miller replaced Davis as Premier of Ontario on February 8, 1985, he named Stephenson as the Chair of the Management Board of Cabinet.

Under Miller's leadership, the Progressive Conservatives were reduced to a tenuous minority government in the 1985 provincial election. Stephenson was personally re-elected without difficulty, and was named as Ontario's first female Treasurer and Deputy Premier on May 17. She accomplished little in these roles. Before having the chance as Treasurer to present a budget, the Miller government was defeated by a motion of non-confidence in June 1985, after the Liberals reached an agreement allowing them to form government with the support of the Ontario New Democratic Party. In opposition, she served as her party's Critic for Health. She retired from politics at the 1987 provincial election.

=== Cabinet positions ===
Miller ministry, Province of Ontario (1985)
Cabinet posts (3)
Predecessor	Office	Successor
Bob Welch	Deputy Premier; 1985 (May–June)	Robert Nixon (Note: Post vacant until 1987 when Nixon named Deputy Premier.)
Larry Grossman	Treasurer; 1985 (May–June)	Robert Nixon
George McCague	Chair of the Management Board of Cabinet; 1985 (February–May)	George Ashe
Davis ministry, Province of Ontario (1971–1985)
Cabinet posts (3)
Predecessor	Office	Successor
Thomas Wells	Minister of Education; 1978–1985	Keith Norton
Harry Parrott	Minister of Colleges and Universities; 1978–1985	Keith Norton
John MacBeth	Minister of Labour; 1975–1978	Robert Elgie

== After politics ==
In the 1990s, Stephenson was appointed as a board member on the province's new Education Quality and Accountability Office, which monitors and reports to the public on the performance of the education system. From 1997 to 2005, she was chair of the Learning Opportunities Task Force. and was involved with the Gwillimbury Foundation in its attempt to build a university in Queensville, Ontario. She is a founding member of the Canadian Institute for Advanced Research and also served on the boards of the Ontario Innovation Trust and the police services board overseeing the Ontario Provincial Police.

In 1992, she was made an Officer of the Order of Canada in recognition of having "made exceptional contributions to society throughout her career". In 1999, she was awarded the Order of Ontario and the Governor General's Award in Commemoration of the Persons Case. The Bette Stephenson Centre for Learning, a York Region District School Board school in Richmond Hill offering adult education programs, was named after her. In 2013, she was inducted into the Canadian Medical Hall of Fame.

Stephenson died in Richmond Hill on August 19, 2019, at the age of 95.
