= Arthur Meen =

Canadian politician

Ontario MPP
- In office 1967–1977
- Preceded by: Hollis Beckett
- Succeeded by: Robert Elgie
- Constituency: York East

Personal details
- Born: March 17, 1924 Toronto, Ontario, Canada
- Died: March 2, 2008 (aged 83) Markham, Ontario, Canada
- Party: Progressive Conservative
- Domestic partner: Shirley Anne Code
- Children: 3
- Occupation: Lawyer

Arthur Kenneth Meen (March 17, 1924 – March 2, 2008) was a politician in Ontario, Canada. He was a Progressive Conservative member of the Legislative Assembly of Ontario from 1967 to 1977 who represented the Toronto riding of York East. He served in the cabinet of the government of Bill Davis.

== Background ==
Meen was born in Toronto, Ontario in 1924. He was educated as a lawyer. He worked for Gulf Oil Ltd. and was a partner in his own law firm, Fraser and Meen. In 1951, he married Shirley Code. They raised three daughters together. He died at Woodhaven Long Term Care Markham, Ontario in 2008.

== Politics ==
In the 1967 provincial election he ran as the Progressive Conservative candidate in the Toronto riding of York East. He defeated Liberal candidate Peter Lowry by 4,456 votes. In 1971 he faced a challenge by popular East York mayor True Davidson but easily defeated her by 7,890 votes. He was also re-elected in 1975.

In February 1974, Meen was appointed to cabinet as Minister of Revenue in the government of Bill Davis. In February 1977, he was reassigned as Minister of Correctional Services. In April 1977, he announced his intention to retire from politics and did not run in the June election. He said in his resignation letter that after 10 years in the legislature he was 'eager to explore fresh opportunities' while he was still in good health.

=== Cabinet positions ===
Davis ministry, Province of Ontario (1971–1985)
Cabinet posts (2)
Predecessor	Office	Successor
John Smith	Minister of Correctional Services; 1977 (February–June)	John MacBeth
Allan Grossman	Minister of Revenue; 1974–1977	Margaret Scrivener

== Later life ==
In 1980, Meen was appointed a provincial court judge by Attorney General Roy McMurtry. In 1985, he sparked controversy by dismissing trespassing charges laid against protesters outside Henry Morgentaler's abortion clinic in Toronto. He said in his judgment, "There is considerable evidence that life begins at the moment of conception." Frequently praising the defendants in court he went further to say, "the clinic was operating outside the law, and as such was therefore murder." Meen felt the protesters were not guilty because they were acting to prevent a bigger crime. NDP MPP Evelyn Gigantes criticized Meen's decision and called for the judge to be censured. Attorney General Ian Scott refused to do so saying that Meen's decision was irrelevant to the abortion debate.
