= Ministry of Revenue (Ontario) =

The Ministry of Revenue was the ministry in Ontario, Canada responsible for administering most of the province's major tax statutes as well as a number of tax credit, incentive and benefit programs. The ministry was also responsible for managing relationships, particularly with the Canada Revenue Agency, in their administration of provincial taxes and benefit programs on behalf of Ontario. The ministry promoted the integrity of Ontario's self-assessing tax system by encouraging compliance through taxpayer education and customer service, while discouraging non-compliance through enforcement activities.

Following the 2011 Ontario general election, the Ministry of Revenue was merged into the Ministry of Finance.

== Minister of Revenue ==
Portrait	Name	Term of office		Tenure	Political party (Ministry)	Note
Minister of Revenue					PC (Robarts)	
	Charles MacNaughton	July 23, 1968	October 10, 1968	79 days	PC (Robarts)	
	John White	October 10, 1968	March 1, 1971	2 years, 142 days	PC (Robarts)	
	Eric Alfred Winkler	March 1, 1971	February 2, 1972	338 days	PC (Davis)	
	Allan Grossman	February 2, 1972	February 26, 1974	2 years, 24 days}	PC (Davis)	
	Arthur Meen	February 26, 1974}	February 3, 1977	2 years, 343 days	PC (Davis)	
	Margaret Scrivener	February 3, 1977	January 21, 1978	352 days	PC (Davis)	
	Lorne Maeck	January 21, 1978	April 10, 1981	3 years, 79 days	PC (Davis)	
	George Ashe	April 10, 1981	July 6, 1983	2 years, 87 days	PC (Davis)	
	Bud Gregory	July 6, 1983	February 8, 1985	1 year, 315 days	PC (Davis)	
	Bud Gregory	February 8, 1985	May 17, 1985	1 year, 315 days	PC (Miller ministry)	
	Gordon Howlett Dean	May 17, 1985	June 26, 1985	40 days)	PC (Miller ministry)	
	Robert Nixon	June 26, 1985	September 29, 1987	2 years, 95 days	Liberal (Peterson)	Concurrently Minister of Finance
	Bernard Grandmaître	September 29, 1987	August 2, 1989	1 year, 307 days	Liberal (Peterson)	
	Remo Mancini	August 2, 1989	October 1, 1990	1 year, 60 days	Liberal (Peterson)	
	Shelley Wark-Martyn	October 1, 1990	February 1, 1993	2 years, 123 days	NDP (Rae)	
	merged with Ministry of Finance				NDP (Rae)	
	merged with Ministry of Finance				PC (Harris)	
	merged with Ministry of Finance				PC (Eves)	
	merged with Ministry of Finance				Liberal (McGuinty)	
	Michael Chan	February 21, 2007	October 30, 2007	251 days	Liberal (McGuinty)	
	Monique Smith	October 30, 2007	September 18, 2008	324 days	Liberal (McGuinty)	
	merged with Ministry of Finance				Liberal (McGuinty)	
	John Wilkinson	June 24, 2009	August 18, 2010	1 year, 55 days	Liberal (McGuinty)	
	Sophia Aggelonitis	August 18, 2010	October 20, 2011	1 year, 63 days	Liberal (McGuinty)	
	merged with Ministry of Finance				Liberal (McGuinty)	
