= Robert Elgie =

Canadian politician

Robert Elgie CM

Member of Provincial Parliament for York East
- In office June 9, 1977 – September 26, 1985
- Preceded by: Arthur Meen
- Succeeded by: Christine Hart

Ontario Minister of Labour
- In office May 17, 1985 – June 26, 1985
- Premier: Frank Miller
- Preceded by: Russ Ramsay
- Succeeded by: Bill Wrye
- In office August 18, 1978 – February 13, 1982
- Premier: Bill Davis
- Preceded by: Bette Stephenson
- Succeeded by: Russ Ramsay

Ontario Minister of Community and Social Services
- In office February 8, 1985 – May 17, 1985
- Premier: Frank Miller
- Preceded by: Frank Drea
- Succeeded by: Ernie Eves

Ontario Minister of Consumer and Commercial Relations
- In office February 13, 1982 – February 8, 1985
- Premier: Bill Davis
- Preceded by: Robert C. Mitchell
- Succeeded by: Gordon Walker

Personal details
- Born: Robert Goldwin Elgie; January 22, 1929 Toronto, Ontario, Canada
- Died: April 3, 2013 (aged 84)
- Party: Progressive Conservative
- Spouse: Nancy Elgie
- Parent: Goldwin Elgie (father)
- Education: University of Western Ontario (BA); Osgoode Hall Law School (LLB); University of Ottawa (MD)
- Occupation: Lawyer; neurosurgeon; politician

Robert Goldwin Elgie CM (January 22, 1929 – April 3, 2013) was a Canadian lawyer, surgeon and politician. Elgie was elected to the Legislative Assembly of Ontario in 1977 and sat as the member of Provincial Parliament (MPP) for York East until 1985. A member of the Progressive Conservative (PC) Party, Elgie served in the provincial cabinet from 1978 to 1985, notably as Minister of Labour. He was a member of the Ontario Press Council from 2001, serving as chair from 2006 until his death.

== Early life and career ==
Robert Elgie was born in Toronto, Ontario. His father, Goldwin Elgie, was also a MPP in the 1930s and 1940s. After graduating from the University of Toronto Schools, he received his Bachelor of Arts (B.A.) from the University of Western Ontario in 1950, his law degree from Osgoode Hall Law School and his medical degree from the University of Ottawa. He trained as both a lawyer and neurosurgeon, and worked in the medical field. Elgie taught at the medical schools of Queen's University and the University of Toronto and was chief of medical staff at Scarborough General Hospital.

== Political career ==
Elgie was first elected to the Legislative Assembly of Ontario in the 1977 provincial election, winning an easy victory in the Toronto-area seat of York East. After a brief period in the government backbenches, he was appointed to Bill Davis's cabinet on August 18, 1978, as Minister of Labour. A Red Tory by ideology, Elgie was easily the most left-wing figure in the Davis cabinet. He was supported by the province's unions, and passed amendments to Ontario's Human Rights Code and Occupational Health and Safety regulations which were favourable to labour interests. Some campus Progressive Conservative groups opposed his efforts to grant human rights officers the right to investigate and arbitrate reports of workplace discrimination.

Elgie was easily re-elected in the 1981 election, and was named Minister of Consumer and Commercial Relations on February 13, 1982. He supported Roy McMurtry's bid to succeed Davis as party leader in 1985. When Frank Miller replaced Davis as Premier of Ontario on February 8, 1985, he named Elgie as his Minister of Community and Social Services. He was re-elected with a reduced majority in the 1985 election, as the Progressive Conservatives won a narrow minority government under Miller's leadership. Elgie was again appointed as Minister of Labour on May 17, 1985.

Following the election, Elgie favoured an alliance with the New Democratic Party to keep the Progressive Conservatives in power. These plans came to nothing, and the opposition Liberal Party was able to form a minority government with NDP support on June 26, 1985. Elgie had little interest in serving on the opposition benches, and soon accepted an appointment by new Liberal Premier David Peterson as chair of the Workers' Compensation Board of Ontario. He formally resigned from the legislature on September 26, 1985, and served as chair of the Ontario Worker's Compensation Board until 1991.

== Later life ==
After leaving the WCB, he moved to Nova Scotia, and served as the founder first director of Dalhousie University's Health Law Institute from 1991 until 1996. He was appointed part-time chair of Nova Scotia's Workers' Compensation Board in the same period, and is credited with making significant improvements to this board's activities. Returning to Ontario, Elgie then served as chair of the Patent Medicine Prices Review Board from 1995 to 2005, and was appointed chair of the Ontario Greenbelt Council by the provincial Minister of Municipal Affairs in the summer of 2005 with a salary of $1 a year. On Jan. 1, 2006, he became the 6th Chair of the Ontario Press Council, of which he had been a member since 2001. He served as chair until his death in 2013. In his later life he lived in the town of Georgina, Ontario, in York Region.

Despite serving and supporting the Tories for much of his life, Elgie's left leaning ideologies led him away from the conservative party later in his life. During the Mike Harris government of the 1990s, Elgie complained that the Ontario Progressive Conservatives had become too right-wing.

Elgie was named to the Order of Canada in 2003. He died on April 4, 2013, from congestive heart failure.

== Family ==
Bob Elgie married his wife Nancy in 1956, and she became an integral part of his life and career. Nancy, a psychologist by trade, served as a school trustee (and vice chair 2011-13 and 2015) in the York Region District School Board. She stepped down in 2017 over a racial slur controversy following a concussion. Together they raised 5 children, and despite his many careers, Bob always did his best to make time for his family. Elgie helped create a loving home and taught his children that those who are born into fortunate circumstances are expected to give back to society. His eldest daughter, Allyson, is a psychologist who runs a provincial assessment and research centre, The Regional Assessment and Resource Centre, which provides supports to post-secondary students with disabilities. His eldest son, Stewart, is an environmental lawyer and economist, founder of the Sierra Legal Defence Fund, and a professor at the University of Ottawa. In 2007 Stewart founded Sustainable Prosperity, a national environment-economy research and policy think tank. His second son, William ("Bill"), retired as the Director of the Upper Canada College Norval Outdoor School and a leader in the Outdoor Education community. Their youngest son, Peter, is a teacher and has run for the Green Party of Canada and has been deputy leader of the Green Party of Ontario. His youngest daughter, Catherine, is a nurse. Between his 5 children, Robert Elgie was also grandfather to 13 grandchildren.

Miller ministry, Province of Ontario (1985)
Cabinet posts (2)
Predecessor	Office	Successor
Russ Ramsay	Minister of Labour; 1985 (May–June)	Bill Wrye
Frank Drea	Minister of Community and Social Services; 1985 (February–May)	Ernie Eves
Davis ministry, Province of Ontario (1971–1985)
Cabinet posts (2)
Predecessor	Office	Successor
Bob Mitchell	Minister of Consumer and Commercial Relations; 1982–1985	Gordon Walker
Bette Stephenson	Minister of Labour; 1978–1982	Russ Ramsay
