= Larry Grossman (politician) =

Canadian politician (1943–1997)

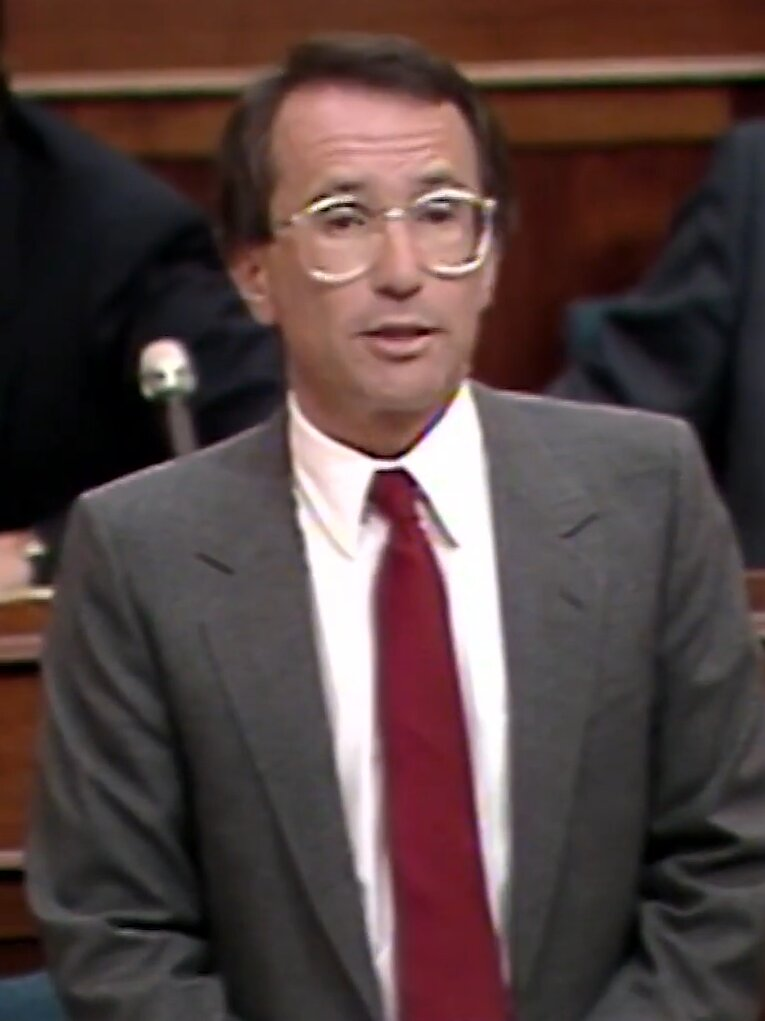
- Grossman in 1986

Member of the Ontario Provincial Parliament for St. Andrew—St. Patrick
- In office 1975–1987
- Preceded by: Allan Grossman
- Succeeded by: Ron Kanter

Leader of the Ontario PC Party
- In office 1985–1987
- Preceded by: Frank Miller
- Succeeded by: Mike Harris (Note: Andy Brandt was interim leader 1987-1989.)

Leader of the Official Opposition
- In office 1985–1987
- Preceded by: David Peterson
- Succeeded by: Bob Rae

Personal details
- Born: Lawrence Sheldon Grossman; December 2, 1943 Toronto, Ontario
- Died: June 22, 1997 (aged 53) Toronto, Ontario
- Resting place: Beth Tzedec Memorial Park
- Party: Progressive Conservative
- Spouse: Carole (div.)
- Children: 3
- Parent(s): Allan Grossman and Ethel Starkman
- Occupation: Lawyer

Lawrence Sheldon "Larry" Grossman, (December 2, 1943 – June 22, 1997) was a politician in Ontario, Canada. He served in the Legislative Assembly as a Progressive Conservative from 1975 to 1987, and was a cabinet minister in the governments of Bill Davis and Frank Miller. Grossman was leader of the Ontario Progressive Conservatives from 1985 to 1987.

== Background ==
Born in Toronto, Grossman was the son of Allan Grossman, a former insurance agent who had represented a downtown Toronto riding in the Legislative Assembly of Ontario for twenty years after defeating Ontario's last Communist Member of Provincial Parliament, J. B. Salsberg. Grossman's family was of Polish Jewish origin. He attended Forest Hill Collegiate and went to the University of Toronto and the Osgoode Hall Law School. He was admitted to the bar in 1969.

== Politics ==
Grossman's first foray into politics was in the Toronto municipal election of 1972. He competed for alderman in Ward 11, but lost, coming third behind Anne Johnston and David Smith.

When his father retired, Grossman contested and won in the provincial riding of St. Andrew—St. Patrick in the 1975 election, defeating Ontario New Democratic Party candidate Barbara Beardsley by 429 votes. He was re-elected in the 1977, 1981, and 1985 elections.

After serving as parliamentary assistant to the Attorney General from 1975 to 1977, Grossman was appointed to cabinet on September 21, 1977 as Minister of Consumer and Commercial Relations. On October 18, 1978, Grossman was shuffled to Minister of Industry and Tourism.

Grossman was promoted to the high-profile position of Health Minister on February 18, 1982, and was named Provincial Treasurer and Minister of Economics on July 6, 1983. In cabinet, Grossman's progressive views earned him a reputation as a Red Tory, and he clashed with his own party after then-Health Minister Frank Miller closed the Kensington Hospital in Grossman's riding.

=== Cabinet posts ===
Davis ministry, Province of Ontario (1971–1985)
Cabinet posts (4)
Predecessor	Office	Successor
Frank Miller	Treasurer (Note: Was Treasurer for Premier Frank Miller briefly from February - May 1985.); 1983–1985; Also Minister of Economics	Bette Stephenson
Dennis Timbrell	Minister of Health; 1982–1983	Thomas Wells
John Rhodes	Minister of Industry and Tourism; 1978–1982	Reuben Baetz
Sid Handleman	Minister of Consumer and Commercial Relations; 1977–1978	Frank Drea

=== Leadership ===
When Davis announced his resignation as leader of the party and premier of the province, Grossman ran to succeed him. He was widely regarded as the most progressive candidate, and was endorsed by members of the party's Toronto-based Big Blue Machine. His supporters included Susan Fish, Russ Ramsay, Phil Gillies, Bruce McCaffrey and George Taylor. However, delegates to the party's January 1985 leadership convention chose the more conservative Frank Miller as leader. Grossman placed third on the first ballot, ahead of Roy McMurtry, but behind Miller and Dennis Timbrell. With the support of the McMurtry campaign, Grossman moved six votes ahead of Timbrell on the second ballot. It was confirmed in 1987 by Dr. John Balkwill that the Miller campaign did not want the prospect of facing Timbrell on the final ballot, since their tracking of delegate intentions showed that their candidate would lose decisively to Timbrell, so about 30-40 Miller delegates voted strategically for Grossman to ensure Timbrell's elimination.

Timbrell, who was a rival of Grossman but also wanted to prevent a Miller victory, reluctantly endorsed Grossman after the results were confirmed by a recount. He did not bring enough delegates on the third ballot, however, and Grossman lost to Miller. Grossman remained the Provincial Treasurer in Miller's government.

Miller ran a disastrous campaign in the 1985 election, and the party was reduced to a fragile minority government. Grossman was appointed as Minister of Education and Minister of Colleges and Universities after the election, but was unable to accomplish anything of significance before the Liberals and New Democrats joined forces to topple Miller's government in the legislature.

Miller quickly resigned as leader, and Grossman was chosen as the new leader over Dennis Timbrell and Alan Pope at a second leadership convention on November 16, 1985. Pope was forced on the defensive when one of his workers was caught polling party members as to whether religion would make a difference in the leadership race, which was seen as a reference to Grossman's Jewish background. Timbrell lost support when he declared his opposition to the full funding of Catholic schools, causing Norm Sterling to defect to Grossman's campaign. Grossman defeated Timbrell by only 19 votes on the second ballot, in a campaign that was marked by considerable acrimony.

Grossman became Leader of the Opposition to the Liberal Premier David Peterson.

Grossman's political hero was Benjamin Disraeli, whose portrait was displayed on his office wall. Shortly after winning the leadership of the Ontario Progressive Conservatives, he criticized American "neo-Conservatism" as "a shallow reconstitution of laissez-faire liberalism."

=== Opposition ===
The Peterson government was very popular, and Grossman's Tories, in opposition for the first time since 1943, had a difficult time adjusting to their new role. When the Liberals called an early election for the fall of 1987, Grossman's Tories tried to campaign on a right-wing platform of tax cuts and reduced government spending. Grossman's history as a Red Tory made for a poor contrast with the party's new platform. Peterson won a strong majority government in the 1987 election, and the Conservatives were reduced from 52 seats to 16, falling to third place behind the NDP—their worst showing in over half a century. Grossman lost his own seat to Liberal challenger Ron Kanter and promptly resigned. The party selected Andy Brandt as interim leader.

== Retirement and last years ==
He assisted new party leader Mike Harris in the 1990 provincial election, and coached him to stay "on-message" with the issue of tax cuts.

In the early 1990s, Grossman hosted a weekend talk show on radio station CFRB. In 1991, Grossman wrote a book entitled "A Baseball Addicts Diary" that chronicled and analyzed the 1991 Toronto Blue Jays. In 1992, he hosted "Baseball Sunday Night" on CFRB.

In 1997, Larry Grossman died at the age of 53 from brain cancer. A few days before his death, he invited TVOntario cameras into his house to help with TVO's membership campaign. He was named to the Order of Ontario shortly before his death. He left behind three children, Melissa, Jaimie and Robbie. He was divorced from Carole, his ex-wife, at the time of his death.

In 2004, the Forest Hill Arena, a local Toronto hockey and skating rink where his children played, was renamed the Larry Grossman Forest Hill Memorial Arena in his honour.
