= George Ashe (Canadian politician) =

Canadian politician

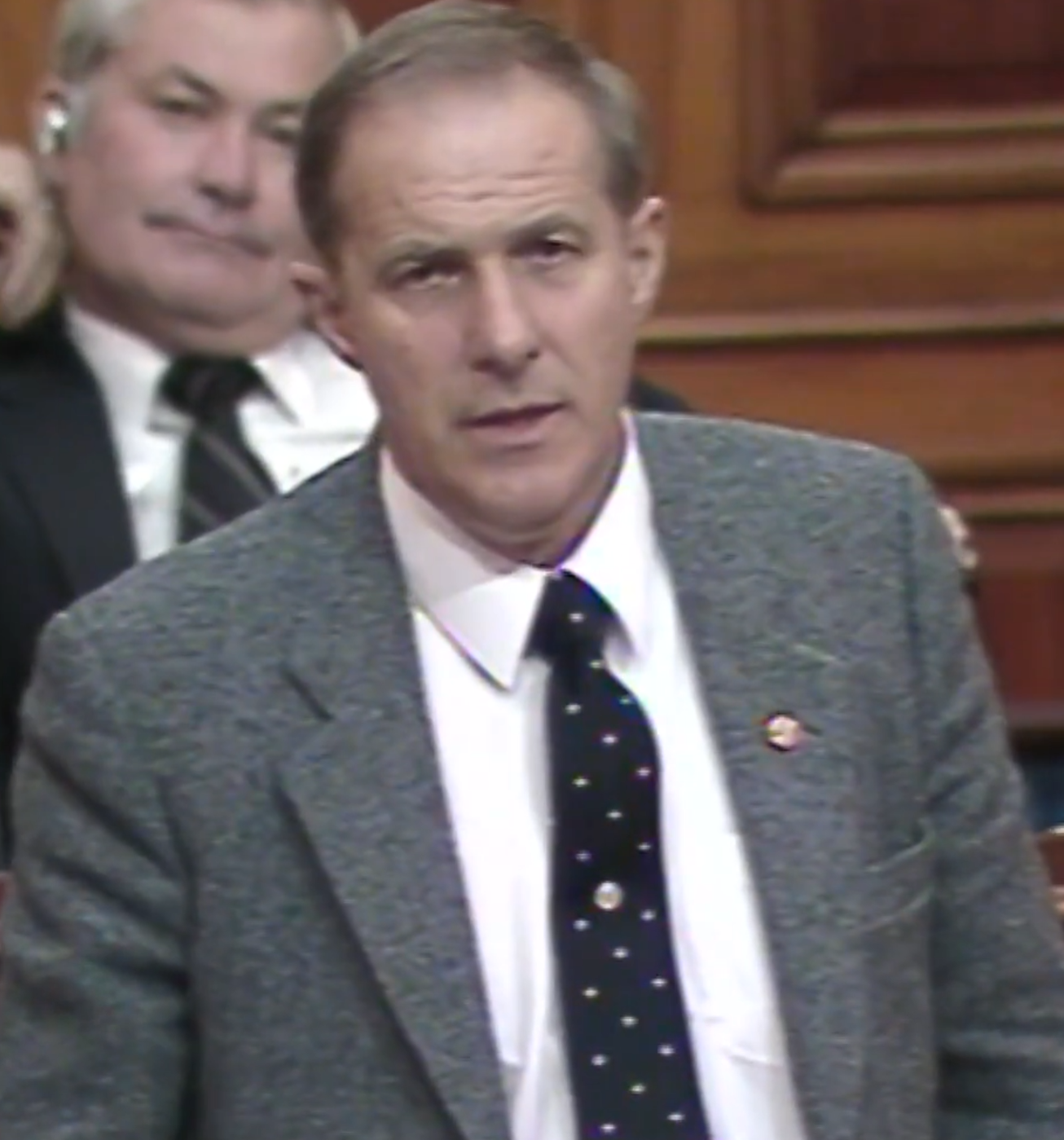
- Ashe in 1986

Member of the Ontario Provincial Parliament for Durham West
- In office June 9, 1977 – September 10, 1987
- Preceded by: Charles Godfrey
- Succeeded by: Norah Stoner

Personal details
- Born: George Lyle Ashe; October 5, 1932 Ottawa, Ontario, Canada
- Died: August 3, 2014 (aged 81) Whitby, Ontario, Canada
- Party: Progressive Conservative
- Spouse: Margaret "Margo" Conroy (m. 1954)
- Children: 4 (including Kevin)
- Profession: Politician

George Lyle Ashe (October 5, 1932 – August 3, 2014) was a Canadian politician. He was a Progressive Conservative Party member of the Legislative Assembly of Ontario from 1977 to 1987 who represented the Durham region riding of Durham West. He served as a cabinet minister in the governments of Bill Davis and Frank Miller.

== Background ==
Ashe was born in Ottawa, Ontario, and educated in that city. He worked in agency management for Northern Life of Canada. He was a Separate School trustee for the Roman Catholic board in Gloucester Township in the late 1950s. He and his wife Margo raised four children.

== Politics ==
He was an alderman for Nepean Township in the early 1960s. He was elected deputy reeve of Pickering in 1969, and became the city's first mayor four years later. Ashe served as mayor of Pickering until 1977, and was also a member of the Durham Regional Council.

He was elected to the Ontario legislature in the 1977 election, in the riding of Durham West defeating New Democratic Party incumbent Charles Godfrey by 593 votes. He served as parliamentary assistant to three ministers, and was re-elected with an increased plurality in the 1981 election. Ashe was appointed to Bill Davis's cabinet on April 10, 1981, as Minister of Revenue.

Following a cabinet shuffle on July 6, 1983, Ashe was named as Minister of Government Services. Ashe supported Frank Miller to succeed Davis in the Progressive Conservative Party's 1985 leadership convention, and was named Minister of Energy when Miller became in as Premier of Ontario on February 8, 1985.

Ashe was re-elected in the 1985 election, which reduced Miller's Conservatives to minority government status. He was appointed as Chair of the Management Board of Cabinet on May 17, 1985, but accomplished little before Miller's government was defeated in the house in June. In opposition, he served as his party's critic for Revenue, the management board, and Financial Institutions. He lost the Durham West constituency to Liberal Norah Stoner by 5,843 votes in the 1987 election, amid a Liberal sweep of the province.

Ashe's son, Kevin is also the Mayor of Pickering, elected in 2022. During the 40th Ontario general election, Ashe was the Progressive Conservative Party of Ontario in Ajax—Pickering but ultimately lost.

=== Cabinet positions ===
Miller ministry, Province of Ontario (1985)
Cabinet posts (2)
Predecessor	Office	Successor
Bette Stephenson	Chair of the Management Board of Cabinet; 1985 (May–June)	Elinor Caplan
Philip Andrewes	Minister of Energy; 1985 (February–May)	Mike Harris
Davis ministry, Province of Ontario (1971–1985)
Cabinet posts (2)
Predecessor	Office	Successor
Douglas Wiseman	Minister of Government Services; 1983–1985	Bob Runciman
Lorne Maeck	Minister of Revenue; 1981–1983	Bud Gregory

== Later life ==
In 2003, Ashe was elected as a Trustee for the Peterborough Victoria Northumberland and Clarington District School Board and he served one three-year term. He died in 2014 of Parkinson's disease.
