= Treasury Board Secretariat (Ontario) =

Ministry of the Government of Ontario

- French: Secrétariat du Conseil du Trésor
- Government of Ontario wordmark

Ministry overview
- Formed: 1962 (first established); 2014 (re-established)
- Jurisdiction: Government of Ontario
- Headquarters: 315 Front Street West 7th Floor Toronto, Ontario M7A 0B8
- Minister responsible: Kinga Surma, President of the Treasury Board
- Deputy Minister responsible: Carlene Alexander, Secretary of the Treasury Board

The Treasury Board Secretariat (TBS; French: Secrétariat du Conseil du Trésor) is the ministry of the Government of Ontario that is charged with supporting the work of the Treasury Board/Management Board of Cabinet (TB/MBC), a joint sub-committee of the Executive Council of Ontario that manages the fiscal plan of the government. This includes reviewing and controlling all government spending, approving labour agreements and workforce planning, management of the provincial contingency fund, and overseeing the procedures and directives that guide the operation of the Ontario Public Service.

The current president of the Treasury Board is Kinga Surma.

== History ==
The Treasury Board was originally established in 1886 as a committee of the Cabinet of Ontario. Prior to 1950, the board met infrequently and had no permanent staff. Its primary role during this period was to review and approve Special Warrants and Treasury Board Orders to meet shortfalls in departmental estimates.

The development of the government in the wake of the depression and war, however, quickly overwhelmed the ability of the existing system to deal with demands on government revenues. A private firm of auditors, Woods, Gordon and Company, recommended a complete revision of the functions of the Treasury Board to deal with the new situation. The Financial Administration Act of 1954, formalized the board's role as the committee of the cabinet on all matters relating to finance, revenues, estimates, expenditures and any other matter concerning general administrative policy of the government. The board was also given the power to call witnesses and compel the production of documents from the public service relating to financial administration and to make regulations relating to the administration of public money and the efficient administration of the public service.

Although the Treasury Board possessed a secretary as early as 1956, a permanent Treasury Board Secretariat was not established until 1962. Initially, the secretariat only has two broad functions: to support the Treasury Board as a committee of cabinet, and to provide management and budgetary advisory to ministries and agencies of government. Throughout 1960s, it assumed other government-wide management functions such as records management and the development of automated information systems within the public service.

In 1971, the Treasury Board was renamed the Management Board of Cabinet with expanded responsibilities for the management of the public service, and the secretariat was renamed the Management Board Secretariat. Over time, the functions of the Management Board Secretariat expanded to include coordination and providing corporate administrative and resources management services for the government, in areas that included information and information technology, human resources, procurement, accommodation, assets management, and administrative support, as well as the management of record retention.

In 1991, a new Treasury Board was established within the Ministry of Treasury and Economics to assume the financial management functions of the Management Board of Cabinet and the Management Board Secretariat. However, in 1995, this board was dissolved. Its fiscal planning and controllership functions were transferred to the Fiscal and Financial Policy Division of the Ministry of Finance, while responsibility for the estimates and expenditure process were returned to management board.

Also in 1991, the staff and responsibilities of the Human Resources Secretariat were absorbed by the Management Board Secretariat.

In early 1993, the Management Board Secretariat absorbed the existing Ministry of Government Services. In 2000, the Archives of Ontario was transferred from the Ministry of Citizenship, Culture and Recreation.

In 2005, the Management Board Secretariat ceased to exist, and most of its corporate management functions were reverted to a newly re-established Ministry of Government Services, while responsibilities for the provincial estimates and expenditure monitoring were transferred to the Ministry of Finance.

In 2014, the Treasury Board and a corresponding Treasury Board Secretariat were re-established. Treasury Board and management board, while legislatively two separate cabinet committees, became a joint sub-committee of cabinet.

== Board chairs and presidents ==
Name	Term of office		Political party (Ministry)	Note
Chair of the Treasury Board				
James Allan	December 15, 1961	November 24, 1966	PC (Robarts)	While Treasurer
Charles MacNaughton	November 24, 1966	March 1, 1971	PC (Robarts)	While Treasurer
Darcy McKeough	March 1, 1971	April 7, 1972	PC (Davis)	While Treasurer
Chair of the Management Board of Cabinet			PC (Davis)	Between 1972 and 2005, the chair headed a corresponding ministry.
Charles MacNaughton	February 2, 1972	September 28, 1972	PC (Davis)	
Eric Winkler	September 28, 1972	October 7, 1975	PC (Davis)	
James Auld	October 7, 1975	August 18, 1978	PC (Davis)	While Minister of Government Services (June 23, 1977 – September 21, 1977)
George McCague	August 18, 1978	February 8, 1985	PC (Davis)	
Bette Stephenson	February 8, 1985	May 17, 1985	PC (Miller)	While Deputy Premier (April 8, 1985 – June 26, 1985)
George Ashe	May 17, 1985	June 26, 1985	PC (Miller)	
Elinor Caplan	June 26, 1985	June 16, 1986	Liberal (Peterson)	While Minister of Government Services
Robert Nixon	June 17, 1986	September 29, 1987	Liberal (Peterson)	Interim Chair, while Treasurer
Murray Elston	September 29, 1987	October 1, 1990	Liberal (Peterson)	Concurrently Minister of Financial Institutions (August 16, 1988 – October 1, 1990)
Frances Lankin	October 1, 1990	July 31, 1991	NDP (Rae)	While Minister of Government Services (October 1, 1990 – April 22, 1991) and Minister of Health (April 22, 1991 – February 3, 1993)
Tony Silipo	July 31, 1991	September 23, 1992	NDP (Rae)	While Minister of Education (October 15, 1991 – February 3, 1993)
Dave Cooke	September 23, 1992	February 3, 1993	NDP (Rae)	While Minister of Municipal Affairs (July 31, 1991 – February 3, 1993)
Brian Charlton	February 3, 1993	June 26, 1995	NDP (Rae)	In 1993, most of the functions performed by the Ministry of Government Services were transferred to the Secretariat of the Management Board of Cabinet.
David Johnson	June 26, 1995	October 10, 1997	PC (Harris)	
Chris Hodgson	October 10, 1997	February 8, 2001	PC (Harris)	Concurrently Minister of Northern Development and Mines (October 10, 1997 – June 17, 1999)
David Tsubouchi	February 8, 2001	April 15, 2002	PC (Harris)	
David Tsubouchi	April 15, 2002	October 22, 2003	PC (Eves)	
Gerry Phillips	October 22, 2003	June 29, 2005	Liberal (McGuinty)	
Greg Sorbara	June 29, 2005	October 11, 2005	Liberal (McGuinty)	While Minister of Finance. Between 2005 and 2014, the chair presides over the board as a committee of cabinet but did not head a corresponding ministry.
Dwight Duncan	October 11, 2005	May 23, 2006	Liberal (McGuinty)	Interim, while interim Minister of Finance
Greg Sorbara	May 23, 2006	October 30, 2007	Liberal (McGuinty)	While Minister of Finance
Dwight Duncan	October 30, 2007	February 11, 2013	Liberal (McGuinty)	While Deputy Premier and Minister of Finance
Harinder Takhar	February 11, 2013	May 8, 2013	Liberal (Wynne)	While Minister of Government Services
Charles Sousa	May 8, 2013	June 24, 2014	Liberal (Wynne)	While Minister of Finance
President of the Treasury Board			Liberal (Wynne)	Since 2014, the President headed a corresponding ministry.
Deb Matthews	June 24, 2014	June 13, 2016	Liberal (Wynne)	While Deputy Premier
Liz Sandals	June 13, 2016	January 17, 2018	Liberal (Wynne)	
Eleanor McMahon	January 17, 2018	June 26, 2018	Liberal (Wynne)	
Peter Bethlenfalvy	June 29, 2018	June 18, 2021	PC (Ford)	
Prabmeet Singh Sarkaria	June 18, 2021	September 4, 2023	PC (Ford)	
Caroline Mulroney	September 4, 2023	June 5, 2026	PC (Ford)	Jill Dunlop is Minister of Emergency Preparedness and Response from March 19, 2025 to Present.
Peter Bethlenfalvy	June 5, 2026	September 10, 2026	PC (Ford)	
Kinga Surma	September 10, 2026			PC (Ford)
