= David Caplan =

Canadian politician (1964–2019)

Member of the Ontario Provincial Parliament
- In office 1997–2011
- Preceded by: Elinor Caplan
- Succeeded by: Michael Coteau
- Constituency: Don Valley East; Oriole (1997-1999)

Personal details
- Born: David Richard Caplan; November 15, 1964 Toronto, Ontario, Canada
- Died: July 24, 2019 (aged 54) Toronto, Ontario, Canada
- Resting place: Pardes Shalom Cemetery
- Party: Liberal
- Spouse: Leigh Caplan
- Relations: Elinor Caplan (mother); Wilfred Caplan (father); Mark Caplan (brother) Meredith Caplan Jamieson (sister) Zane Caplansky (brother)
- Children: 2
- Profession: Real estate agent, school trustee

David Richard Caplan (November 15, 1964 – July 24, 2019) was a Canadian politician in Ontario, Canada. He was a member of the Legislative Assembly of Ontario who represented the ridings of Oriole and Don Valley East from 1997 to 2011 and a cabinet minister in the government of Liberal Premier Dalton McGuinty from 2003 to 2009.

== Background ==
Caplan was born in Toronto, Ontario, and was educated at the University of Western Ontario. He worked as a commercial real estate agent with the firm of Ernest Goodman Ltd. from 1985 to 1989, and was vice-president of Taurus Metal Trading Ltd. (a recycling company) between 1989 and 1992.

Caplan was elected as a trustee to the North York Board of Education in 1991 and served in this capacity for six years, becoming the board's vice-chair in 1993. He also served on the Metropolitan Toronto School Board from 1994 to 1997, becoming its vice-chair shortly before his departure for higher office.

Caplan was the son of Elinor Caplan (née Hershorn), who served as a cabinet minister at the federal and provincial levels. His father, Mayer Wilfred Caplan, was a business person active in politics. He was married to Leigh and had two sons, Benjamin and Jacob.

== Politics ==
In 1997, Elinor Caplan resigned her seat in the Ontario legislature to seek election to the House of Commons of Canada. David Caplan contested his mother's former riding of Oriole in the subsequent by-election, and defeated his Progressive Conservative opponent, former federal Member of Parliament Barbara Greene, by a significant margin. He subsequently served as the Liberal critic for Youth and Training.

Ontario's electoral map was significantly altered in 1996, when Progressive Conservative Premier Mike Harris introduced a bill to reduce the number of members in the legislature from 130 to 103. These changes did not apply to by-elections for the sitting legislature, but came into effect for the provincial election of 1999. As a result, Caplan was forced to face another incumbent Member of Provincial Parliament (MPP), Minister of Education David Johnson, in the new riding of Don Valley East. Johnson had surprised many observers by not running in the safer riding of Don Valley West.

In one of the most closely watched races of the campaign, Caplan defeated Johnson on election night by just over 3,000 votes. There are several public school teachers in Don Valley East, and many suspect that "strategic voting" by this group against the Tories was a leading factor in Caplan's victory. The Progressive Conservatives won the election. Caplan became his party's Housing Critic and Deputy Whip.

Like his mother, David Caplan was a prominent politician in the Jewish community of the North York area. He did not, however, join with several other politicians from this community (including fellow Liberal MPP Monte Kwinter) to support provincial funding for non-Catholic religious schools in 2001. The initiative was brought forward by the Progressive Conservative government of Mike Harris, and the Liberal Party opposed it on the grounds that it would divert money from public schools. While Kwinter publicly disagreed with his party's position, Caplan supported it and referred to the Harris government's plan as "the first step toward a voucher system".

=== 2003 session ===
Caplan was easily re-elected in Don Valley East in the provincial election of 2003, defeating his Progressive Conservative opponent, former city councillor Paul Sutherland, by over 9200 votes. The Liberals won the general election, and Caplan was appointed to Cabinet on October 23, 2003, as Minister of Public Infrastructure Renewal.

Caplan was responsible for leading the modernization of the province's infrastructure and planning for future population and economic growth. He released a long-term $30 billion plus infrastructure investment strategy called ReNew Ontario, which used a private financing model expanding and building new hospitals, schools, colleges and universities, and transit and transportation systems. Caplan was responsible for the Places to Grow Act, 2005, which allows for a better way of accommodating growth across the province through the development of growth plans. The first growth plan under this legislation, the Growth Plan for the Greater Golden Horseshoe, was a 25-year strategy to maximize the benefits of growth and maintain a high quality of life for the fastest growing urban region in Canada. Minister Caplan also had responsibility for several major government agencies managing public assets, including: The Ontario Realty Corporation, Ontario Lottery and Gaming Corporation, Liquor Control Board of Ontario, Infrastructure Ontario and the Toronto Waterfront Revitalization Corporation.

Caplan came under heavy criticism after the Ontario Lottery and Gaming Corporation was mired in a scandal which saw retailers were winning a disproportionate number of jackpots. He stayed on despite opposition calls for his resignation.

After a cabinet shuffle on June 29, 2005, Caplan was given the additional position of Deputy Government House Leader.

=== 2007 session ===
On June 20, 2008, Premier Dalton McGuity announced a cabinet shuffle that saw Caplan swapping portfolios with George Smitherman. Caplan was appointed Minister of Health, while Smitherman was appointed both the Minister of Public Infrastructure Renewal and the Minister of Energy (taking over from Gerry Phillips). There was criticism of Caplan's new portfolio, as he suffered from weight issues and was formerly a heavy smoker, but he dismissed it, saying "My own conversations between me and my doctor are private matters, (as) they are for all of us, and they'll remain private".

In May 2009, there were opposition calls for Caplan's resignation after it was revealed that eHealth Ontario CEO Sarah Kramer had approved about $4.8 million in no-bid contracts during the first four months of the agency's operation, while also spending $50000 to refurnish her office, and paying consultants up to $300 an hour. Nine senior eHealth employees were fired, reportedly for challenging the agency's tendering practices. eHealth Ontario argued that the no-bid contracts were necessary due to the rapid transition process to eHealth from its predecessor Smart Systems for Health Agency, while Caplan defended Kramer's bonus as part of her move from another agency. The opposition noted that the McGuinty government spent five years and $647 million on the Smart Systems for Health Agency, which used 15 per cent of its $225 million annual budget on consultants despite employing 166 people with annual salaries exceeding $100,000, before the project was shut down and restarted as eHealth Ontario. Premier Dalton McGuinty said he was concerned about eHealth's spending information and said that he would act upon the auditor general's report. McGuinty and Caplan said that it was tough to recruit top experts to build a provincewide electronic health records system.

On October 6, 2009, Caplan resigned his post as Health Minister in advance of a report detailing irregularities in spending and expense accounts related to eHealth Ontario, a government agency tasked with the creation of electronic health records.

He announced on July 14, 2011, that he would not be a candidate in the October 6, 2011 provincial election.

=== Cabinet positions ===
McGuinty ministry, Province of Ontario (2003–2013)
Cabinet posts (2)
Predecessor	Office	Successor
George Smitherman	Minister of Health and Long-Term Care; 2007–2009	Deb Matthews
New Ministry	Minister of Infrastructure; 2003–2007; Also Responsible for the OLGC	George Smitherman

== Post-political career ==
Caplan served as vice-chair of public affairs firm Global Public Affairs in Toronto. In December 2017, he started serving as the chief operating officer of ORBA, Ontario Road Builders Association.

== Return to politics ==
Caplan unsuccessfully ran as councillor for Toronto City Council in the 2018 municipal election in Ward 16 – Don Valley East. He was attempting to unseat long-time incumbent Denzil Minnan-Wong who has been referred to as council's "staunchest conservative".

At the time of his death, Caplan was seeking the federal Liberal nomination in Don Valley North for the 2019 Canadian federal election.

== Personal life ==
Caplan was married to Leigh with two children, Benjamin and Jacob. They began dating in high school when Caplan was 17.

He died at his home in Toronto on July 24, 2019, at the age of 54, after a "fire accident", according to his family.

He is the brother of restaurateur Zane Caplansky.

== Electoral record ==
2007 Ontario general election
Party	Candidate	Votes	%	±%
Liberal	David Caplan	19,602	55.6	
Progressive Conservative	Angela Kennedy	8,821	25.0	
New Democratic	Mary Trapani Hynes	3,757	10.7	
Green	Trifon Haitas	2,300	6.5	–
Independent	Stella Kargiannakis	467	1.3	
Family Coalition	Ryan Kidd	196	0.6	
Freedom	Wayne Simmons	98	0.3	

2003 Ontario general election
Party	Candidate	Votes	%	±%
Liberal	David Caplan	21,327	56.8	+6.30
Progressive Conservative	Paul Sutherland	12,027	32.03	-11.16
New Democratic	Murphy Browne	3,058	8.14	+3.76
Green	Dan Craig	558	1.49	+1.29
Family Coalition	Ryan Kidd	460	1.23	+0.86
Freedom	Wayne Simmons	119	0.32	+0.19

1999 Ontario general election
Party	Candidate	Votes	%
Liberal	David Caplan	20,993	50.5
Progressive Conservative	David Johnson	17,955	43.19
New Democratic	Janaki Bala-Krishnan	1,822	4.38
Independent	Raffi Assadourian	329	0.79
Family Coalition	Ryan Kidd	153	0.37
Communist	Elizabeth Rowley	91	0.22
Green	Jeff Pancer	85	0.20
Independent	Fernand Deschamps	65	0.16
Freedom	Wayne Simmons	53	0.13
Natural Law	Shail Lall	28	0.07

Ontario provincial by-election, September 4, 1997: Oriole Resignation of Elinor Caplan to enter federal politics
Party	Candidate	Votes	%	±%
Liberal	David Caplan	9,954	58.40	+14.69
Progressive Conservative	Barbara Greene	5,163	30.29	–9.37
New Democratic	Jim Kafieh	1,700	9.97	–4.37
Independent	Bernadette Michael	132	0.77	–0.18
Green	Shelly Lipsey	96	0.56	+0.11
Total valid votes		17,045	99.32	
Total rejected, unmarked and declined ballots		116	0.68	–0.22
Turnout		17,161	46.48	–21.91
Eligible voters		36,924		
Liberal hold		Swing		+12.03
Source: Elections Ontario
