= 1990 Ontario general election =

Canadian provincial election

- September 6, 1990

130 seats in the 35th Legislative Assembly of Ontario 66 seats needed for a majority
- Turnout: 64.45%
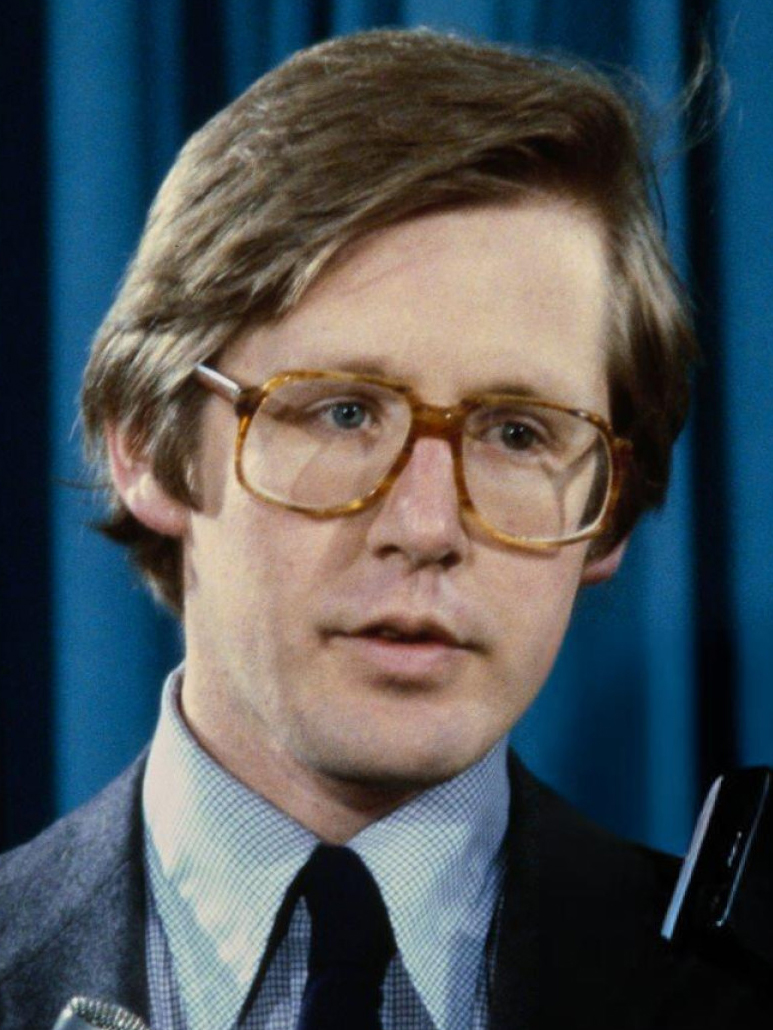

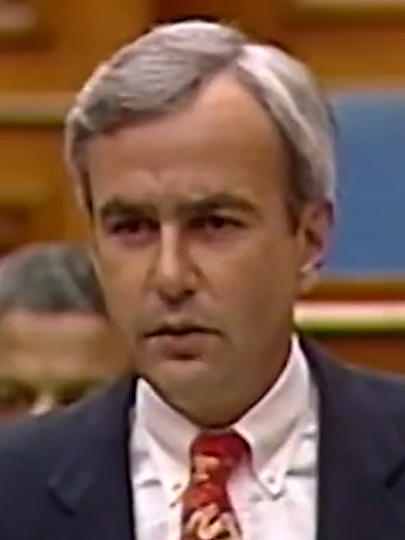

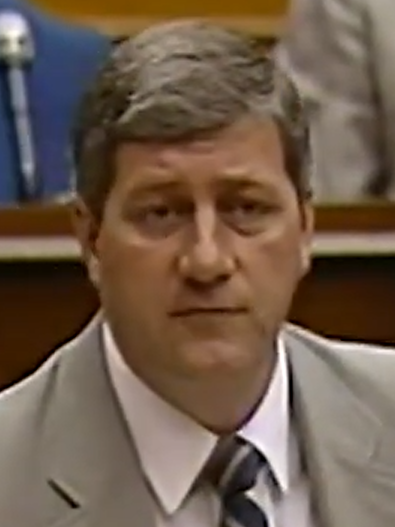
| | First party | Second party | Third party |
|---|---|---|---|
| Leader | Bob Rae | David Peterson | Mike Harris |
| Party | New Democratic | Liberal | Progressive Conservative |
| Leader since | February 7, 1982 | February 21, 1982 | May 12, 1990 |
| Leader's seat | York South | London Centre (lost re-election) | Nipissing |
| Last election | 19 | 95 | 16 |
| Seats won | 74 | 36 | 20 |
| Seat change | ▲55 | ▼59 | ▲4 |
| Popular vote | 1,509,506 | 1,302,134 | 944,564 |
| Percentage | 37.6% | 32.4% | 23.5% |
| Swing | ▲11.9pp | ▼14.9pp | ▼1.2pp |
- Popular vote by riding. As this is an FPTP election, seat totals are not determined by popular vote, but instead via results by each riding. Click the map for more details.
Premier before election
David Peterson
Liberal
Premier after election
Bob Rae
New Democratic

The 1990 Ontario general election was held on September 6, 1990, to elect members of the 35th Legislative Assembly of the province of Ontario, Canada. The governing Ontario Liberal Party led by Premier David Peterson was unexpectedly defeated. Although the Peterson government, and Peterson himself, were very popular, he was accused of opportunism in calling an election just three years into his mandate. In a shocking upset, the New Democratic Party (NDP), led by Bob Rae, won a majority government. This marked the first time the NDP had won government east of Manitoba, and to date the only time the NDP formed the government in Ontario.

Not even the NDP expected to come close to winning power. Rae had already made plans to retire from politics after the election; however, the NDP managed to take many seats in the Greater Toronto Area (GTA) from the Liberals, and Rae himself represented York South, in Metro Toronto. They also did better than ever before, or in some cases since, in many other cities and rural areas. The NDP finished only five points ahead of the Liberals in the popular vote, but due to the nature of the first-past-the-post electoral system, which ignores the popular vote and awards power based on the number of ridings won, the NDP's gains in the GTA decimated the Liberal caucus. The Liberals lost 59 seats, the second-worst defeat for a governing party in Ontario. At the time, it was the Liberals' worst showing in an Ontario election. Peterson himself was heavily defeated in London Centre by NDP challenger Marion Boyd, losing by 8,200 votes, one of the few times a provincial premier has lost their own seat.

Although Mike Harris' Progressive Conservative Party was unable to overcome voter distrust of the federal Progressive Conservative government of Brian Mulroney, his party managed to make a net gain of four seats. Although Harris was from northern Ontario, the Tories were particularly weak in that region, placing fourth, behind the Liberals, NDP, and the right-wing Confederation of Regions Party (CoR) in six northern Ontario ridings (Algoma, Cochrane South, Nickel Belt, Sudbury, Sudbury East, and Sault Ste. Marie). The CoR also placed ahead of the Progressive Conservatives in the Renfrew North and Cornwall ridings in eastern Ontario. Although they received only 1.9% of the vote provincewide, they managed 7.8% in the 33 ridings in which they actually fielded a candidate.

The Green Party of Ontario placed third, ahead of the NDP, in Parry Sound riding, where former Liberal leadership candidate Richard Thomas was the party's candidate.

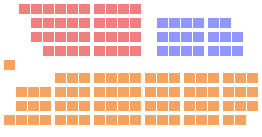
The Ontario Legislature after the 1990 election.

== Riding name change ==
Before the election, an Act was passed, changing the name of Prince Edward—Lennox to Prince Edward—Lennox—South Hastings.

== Opinion polls ==
Evolution of voting intentions at provincial level
| Polling firm | Last day of survey | Source | ONDP | OLP | PCO | Other | ME | Sample |
|---|---|---|---|---|---|---|---|---|
| 1990 election | September 6, 1990 | | 37.6 | 32.4 | 23.5 | 6.5 | | |
| Angus Reid-Southam | August 30, 1990 | | 38 | 34 | 24 | 4 | 3.3 | 804 |
| Environics | August 21, 1990 | | 34 | 40 | 23 | —N/a | 3.1 | 1,008 |
Leader's debate held (August 20, 1990)
| Decima | August 13, 1990 | | 30 | 40 | 28 | —N/a | —N/a | —N/a |
Election called (July 30, 1990)

=== During the 34th Parliament of Ontario ===
Evolution of voting intentions at provincial level
| Polling firm | Last day of survey | Source | ONDP | OLP | PCO | Other | ME | Sample |
|---|---|---|---|---|---|---|---|---|
| Gallup | July 1990 | | 24 | 43 | 26 | —N/a | —N/a | —N/a |
| Environics | July 8, 1990 | | 26 | 50 | 22 | —N/a | 3.2 | 1,000 |
| Environics | April 1990 | | 28 | 47 | 23 | —N/a | —N/a | —N/a |
| Environics | December 1989 | | 26 | 42 | 30 | —N/a | 3.2 | —N/a |
| Environics | September 1989 | | 26 | 45 | 28 | —N/a | 3.2 | —N/a |
| Environics | July 6, 1989 | | 25 | 45 | 29 | —N/a | 3.2 | 1,012 |
| Environics | December 13, 1988 | | 21 | 43 | 34 | —N/a | —N/a | 1,025 |
| Angus Reid | October 1988 | | 20 | 53 | 25 | —N/a | —N/a | —N/a |
| Environics | May 1988 | | 25 | 45 | 28 | 1 | 3.2 | 1,003 |
| Environics | May 1988 | | 25 | 45 | 28 | 1 | 3.2 | 1,003 |
| Gallup | May 14, 1988 | | 25 | 50 | 24 | —N/a | 5 | 571 |
| Environics | February 1988 | | 24 | 54 | 21 | —N/a | 3.2 | 1,003 |
| Environics | November 22, 1987 | | 24 | 52 | 23 | —N/a | 3.2 | 1,008 |
| 1987 election | September 10, 1987 | | 25.7 | 47.3 | 24.7 | 2.3 | | |

== Results ==
Elections to the 35th Parliament of Ontario (1990)
| Political party | Party leader | MPPs | | | | | Votes | | |
| Political party | Party leader | Candidates | 1987 | Dissol. | 1990 | ± | # | % | ± (pp) |
|---|---|---|---|---|---|---|---|---|---|
| New Democratic | Bob Rae | 130 | 19 | 19 | 74 | 55▲ | 1,509,506 | 37.6% | 11.9▲ |
| Liberal | David Peterson | 130 | 95 | 93 | 36 | 59▼ | 1,302,134 | 32.4% | 14.9▼ |
| Progressive Conservative | Mike Harris | 130 | 16 | 17 | 20 | 4▲ | 944,564 | 23.5% | 1.2▼ |
| Family Coalition | Donald Pennell | 68 | – | – | – | – | 110,831 | 2.8% | 1.5▲ |
| Confederation of Regions | Dean Wasson | 33 | – | – | – | – | 75,873 | 1.9% | New |
| Green | Katherine Mathewson | 40 | – | – | – | – | 30,097 | 0.8% | 0.7▲ |
| Libertarian | James Stock | 45 | – | – | – | – | 24,613 | 0.6% | 0.2▲ |
| Freedom | Robert Metz | 10 | – | – | – | – | 6,015 | 0.1% | Steady |
| Communist | Elizabeth Rowley | 4 | – | – | – | – | 1,139 | – | 0.1▼ |
| Independent | | 15 | – | – | – | – | 13,307 | 0.3% | Steady |
| Vacant | | | | 1 | | | | | |
| Total | | 615 | 130 | 130 | 130 | | 4,018,079 | 100.00% | |
| Blank and invalid ballots | | | | | | | 52,575 | | |
| Total ballots cast | | | | | | | 4,070,654 | | |
| Registered voters / turnout | | | | | | | 6,315,949 | 64.5% | 1.8▲ |

=== Vote and seat summaries ===
Ternary plots - shift of electoral support (1987-1990)
1987

1990
Electoral districts identified by colours of winning parties

Popular vote
| New Democratic | 37.57% |
| Liberal | 32.41% |
| PC | 23.51% |
| Others | 6.51% |

Seats summary
| New Democratic | 56.92% |
| Liberal | 27.69% |
| PC | 15.38% |

=== Synopsis of results ===
Results by riding - 1990 Ontario general election
| Riding | Winning party | | | | | | | | Turnout (Note: including spoilt ballots) | Votes (Note: minor political parties receiving less than 1% of the popular vote are aggregated under "Other"; independent candidates are aggregated separately) | | | | | | | |
| Name (Note: order is as given in EO reports) (Note: Names are as specified in 1976 Act plus 1990 amendment - EO file has errors) | 1987 | 1st place | Votes | Share | Margin # | Margin % | 2nd place | 3rd place | Turnout | NDP | Lib | PC | FCP | CoR | Ind | Other | Total |
|---|---|---|---|---|---|---|---|---|---|---|---|---|---|---|---|---|---|
| Algoma | NDP | NDP | 8,221 | 58.65% | 4,648 | 33.16% | Lib | CoR | 65.62% | 8,221 | 3,573 | 433 | – | 1,790 | – | – | 14,017 |
| Algoma—Manitoulin | Lib | Lib | 5,961 | 38.86% | 207 | 1.35% | NDP | PC | 61.25% | 5,754 | 5,961 | 2,163 | – | 1,114 | 347 | – | 15,339 |
| Beaches—Woodbine | NDP | NDP | 14,381 | 58.35% | 8,052 | 32.67% | Lib | PC | 65.95% | 14,381 | 6,329 | 3,535 | – | – | 400 | – | 24,645 |
| Brampton North | Lib | Lib | 11,686 | 34.92% | 98 | 0.29% | NDP | PC | 58.35% | 11,588 | 11,686 | 7,619 | 1,466 | – | 434 | 669 | 33,462 |
| Brampton South | Lib | Lib | 12,918 | 32.31% | 424 | 1.06% | NDP | PC | 59.36% | 12,494 | 12,918 | 11,395 | 2,511 | – | – | 667 | 39,985 |
| Brantford | Lib | NDP | 17,736 | 48.63% | 4,092 | 11.22% | Lib | PC | 66.71% | 17,736 | 13,644 | 3,087 | 1,413 | – | – | 594 | 36,474 |
| Brant—Haldimand | Lib | Lib | 10,751 | 37.35% | 1,469 | 5.10% | NDP | PC | 61.18% | 9,282 | 10,751 | 6,228 | 1,520 | – | – | 1,004 | 28,785 |
| Bruce | Lib | Lib | 11,476 | 37.71% | 3,511 | 11.54% | NDP | PC | 68.92% | 7,965 | 11,476 | 7,349 | 3,639 | – | – | – | 30,429 |
| Burlington South | PC | PC | 17,084 | 52.53% | 8,899 | 27.36% | NDP | Lib | 69.48% | 8,185 | 5,544 | 17,084 | 1,707 | – | – | – | 32,520 |
| Cambridge | NDP | NDP | 21,806 | 60.28% | 14,249 | 39.39% | Lib | PC | 64.84% | 21,806 | 7,557 | 4,449 | 2,364 | – | – | – | 36,176 |
| Carleton | PC | PC | 17,860 | 46.91% | 7,717 | 20.27% | Lib | NDP | 65.15% | 10,071 | 10,143 | 17,860 | – | – | – | – | 38,074 |
| Carleton East | Lib | Lib | 19,059 | 53.88% | 9,083 | 25.68% | NDP | PC | 63.52% | 9,976 | 19,059 | 5,117 | 1,224 | – | – | – | 35,376 |
| Chatham—Kent | Lib | NDP | 13,930 | 44.74% | 3,967 | 12.74% | Lib | PC | 63.01% | 13,930 | 9,963 | 5,619 | 1,626 | – | – | – | 31,138 |
| Cochrane North | Lib | NDP | 6,618 | 40.47% | 143 | 0.87% | Lib | PC | 62.16% | 6,618 | 6,475 | 3,261 | – | – | – | – | 16,354 |
| Cochrane South | PC | NDP | 11,460 | 47.61% | 2,099 | 8.72% | Lib | CoR | 62.95% | 11,460 | 9,361 | 1,019 | – | 2,229 | – | – | 24,069 |
| Cornwall | Lib | Lib | 12,725 | 46.53% | 5,681 | 20.77% | NDP | CoR | 63.79% | 7,044 | 12,725 | 3,169 | – | 4,409 | – | – | 27,347 |
| Don Mills | Lib | NDP | 9,740 | 34.20% | 954 | 3.35% | Lib | PC | 64.23% | 9,740 | 8,786 | 7,631 | – | – | 562 | 1,764 | 28,483 |
| Dovercourt | Lib | NDP | 10,604 | 54.25% | 3,989 | 20.41% | Lib | PC | 66.27% | 10,604 | 6,615 | 1,239 | – | – | – | 1,090 | 19,548 |
| Downsview | Lib | NDP | 13,440 | 56.58% | 5,221 | 21.98% | Lib | PC | 66.08% | 13,440 | 8,219 | 1,477 | – | – | – | 619 | 23,755 |
| Dufferin—Peel | Lib | PC | 10,899 | 34.66% | 572 | 1.82% | Lib | NDP | 66.56% | 8,627 | 10,327 | 10,899 | – | – | – | 1,594 | 31,447 |
| Durham Centre | Lib | NDP | 12,594 | 35.88% | 2,348 | 6.69% | Lib | PC | 61.23% | 12,594 | 10,246 | 9,126 | 1,186 | 1,087 | – | 857 | 35,096 |
| Durham East | PC | NDP | 10,960 | 32.74% | 53 | 0.16% | PC | Lib | 63.43% | 10,960 | 7,836 | 10,907 | 2,487 | 1,286 | – | – | 33,476 |
| Durham West | Lib | NDP | 16,366 | 37.47% | 1,982 | 4.54% | Lib | PC | 62.36% | 16,366 | 14,384 | 11,167 | 1,761 | – | – | – | 43,678 |
| Durham—York | Lib | NDP | 12,297 | 33.89% | 1,230 | 3.39% | Lib | PC | 61.90% | 12,297 | 11,067 | 10,904 | 2,016 | – | – | – | 36,284 |
| Eglinton | Lib | Lib | 12,032 | 35.97% | 173 | 0.52% | PC | NDP | 69.98% | 7,772 | 12,032 | 11,859 | – | – | – | 1,788 | 33,451 |
| Elgin | Lib | NDP | 14,189 | 41.67% | 4,466 | 13.12% | Lib | PC | 66.51% | 14,189 | 9,723 | 9,031 | – | – | – | 1,104 | 34,047 |
| Essex-Kent | Lib | NDP | 15,858 | 52.66% | 5,890 | 19.56% | Lib | PC | 67.52% | 15,858 | 9,968 | 2,739 | 1,551 | – | – | – | 30,116 |
| Essex South | Lib | Lib | 10,575 | 36.02% | 212 | 0.72% | NDP | PC | 59.40% | 10,363 | 10,575 | 6,335 | 2,085 | – | – | – | 29,358 |
| Etobicoke—Humber | Lib | Lib | 13,582 | 38.61% | 3,533 | 10.04% | NDP | PC | 70.29% | 10,049 | 13,582 | 9,289 | 1,292 | – | – | 966 | 35,178 |
| Etobicoke—Lakeshore | NDP | NDP | 18,118 | 57.23% | 11,112 | 35.10% | Lib | PC | 66.15% | 18,118 | 7,006 | 4,854 | 1,053 | – | – | 629 | 31,660 |
| Etobicoke—Rexdale | NDP | NDP | 17,620 | 67.07% | 13,035 | 49.62% | Lib | PC | 61.42% | 17,620 | 4,585 | 3,243 | – | – | – | 822 | 26,270 |
| Etobicoke West | Lib | PC | 13,713 | 40.56% | 3,631 | 10.74% | Lib | NDP | 69.86% | 7,992 | 10,082 | 13,713 | 1,045 | – | 304 | 674 | 33,810 |
| Fort William | Lib | Lib | 11,798 | 44.44% | 1,345 | 5.07% | NDP | PC | 62.74% | 10,453 | 11,798 | 4,300 | – | – | – | – | 26,551 |
| Fort York | Lib | NDP | 11,023 | 46.30% | 1,367 | 5.74% | Lib | PC | 63.48% | 11,023 | 9,656 | 2,258 | – | – | 330 | 539 | 23,806 |
| Frontenac—Addington | Lib | NDP | 9,696 | 33.24% | 1,470 | 5.04% | Lib | PC | 65.15% | 9,696 | 8,226 | 8,211 | 2,020 | – | 1,021 | – | 29,174 |
| Grey | Lib | PC | 13,742 | 36.11% | 2,462 | 6.47% | NDP | Lib | 65.20% | 11,280 | 10,257 | 13,742 | 2,157 | – | – | 620 | 38,056 |
| Guelph | Lib | NDP | 15,051 | 37.91% | 3,107 | 7.83% | Lib | PC | 69.48% | 15,051 | 11,944 | 10,184 | 1,602 | – | – | 920 | 39,701 |
| Halton Centre | Lib | Lib | 13,494 | 35.03% | 1,215 | 3.15% | PC | NDP | 63.12% | 10,163 | 13,494 | 12,279 | 1,232 | – | – | 1,355 | 38,523 |
| Halton North | Lib | NDP | 8,510 | 30.94% | 548 | 1.99% | Lib | PC | 64.50% | 8,510 | 7,962 | 7,499 | 2,489 | – | – | 1,043 | 27,503 |
| Hamilton Centre | Lib | NDP | 14,029 | 55.32% | 6,215 | 24.51% | Lib | PC | 59.78% | 14,029 | 7,814 | 2,116 | 365 | – | – | 1,034 | 25,358 |
| Hamilton East | NDP | NDP | 20,289 | 71.60% | 14,764 | 52.10% | Lib | PC | 61.70% | 20,289 | 5,525 | 1,676 | 846 | – | – | – | 28,336 |
| Hamilton Mountain | NDP | NDP | 22,488 | 59.76% | 14,779 | 39.28% | PC | Lib | 66.55% | 22,488 | 7,432 | 7,709 | – | – | – | – | 37,629 |
| Hamilton West | NDP | NDP | 18,550 | 56.59% | 11,314 | 34.52% | Lib | PC | 67.90% | 18,550 | 7,236 | 4,361 | 2,324 | – | – | 306 | 32,777 |
| Hastings—Peterborough | PC | NDP | 11,283 | 39.89% | 896 | 3.17% | PC | Lib | 68.76% | 11,283 | 4,285 | 10,387 | 1,199 | 1,128 | – | – | 28,282 |
| High Park—Swansea | Lib | NDP | 11,432 | 45.12% | 3,273 | 12.92% | Lib | PC | 64.83% | 11,432 | 8,159 | 4,674 | 409 | – | – | 663 | 25,337 |
| Huron | Lib | NDP | 10,020 | 34.47% | 954 | 3.28% | PC | Lib | 71.47% | 10,020 | 6,653 | 9,066 | 2,931 | – | – | 400 | 29,070 |
| Kenora | Lib | Lib | 8,152 | 40.55% | 331 | 1.65% | NDP | Ind | 61.67% | 7,821 | 8,152 | 1,776 | – | – | 2,357 | – | 20,106 |
| Kingston and the Islands | Lib | NDP | 10,184 | 37.99% | 2,092 | 7.80% | Lib | PC | 57.00% | 10,184 | 8,092 | 7,079 | 1,452 | – | – | – | 26,807 |
| Kitchener | Lib | NDP | 15,750 | 46.82% | 6,019 | 17.89% | Lib | PC | 62.90% | 15,750 | 9,731 | 6,157 | 2,002 | – | – | – | 33,640 |
| Kitchener—Wilmot | Lib | NDP | 16,056 | 43.94% | 5,187 | 14.20% | Lib | PC | 60.09% | 16,056 | 10,869 | 7,342 | 2,270 | – | – | – | 36,537 |
| Lake Nipigon | NDP | NDP | 8,335 | 65.19% | 5,252 | 41.08% | Lib | PC | 59.98% | 8,335 | 3,083 | 735 | 632 | – | – | – | 12,785 |
| Lambton | Lib | NDP | 8,691 | 31.40% | 1,026 | 3.71% | PC | Lib | 68.17% | 8,691 | 7,291 | 7,665 | 3,557 | 471 | – | – | 27,675 |
| Lanark—Renfrew | PC | PC | 11,063 | 32.48% | 1,398 | 4.10% | Lib | NDP | 60.37% | 8,541 | 9,665 | 11,063 | 1,853 | 2,938 | – | – | 34,060 |
| Lawrence | Lib | Lib | 11,786 | 44.70% | 1,607 | 6.10% | NDP | PC | 65.68% | 10,179 | 11,786 | 3,557 | – | – | – | 842 | 26,364 |
| Leeds—Grenville | PC | PC | 16,846 | 49.07% | 7,674 | 22.35% | Lib | NDP | 66.18% | 8,312 | 9,172 | 16,846 | – | – | – | – | 34,330 |
| Lincoln | Lib | NDP | 12,117 | 35.49% | 1,062 | 3.11% | Lib | PC | 68.07% | 12,117 | 11,055 | 9,407 | – | 1,562 | – | – | 34,141 |
| London Centre | Lib | NDP | 17,837 | 51.31% | 8,166 | 23.49% | Lib | PC | 66.05% | 17,837 | 9,671 | 5,348 | 982 | – | 345 | 582 | 34,765 |
| London North | Lib | PC | 18,079 | 41.30% | 4,074 | 9.31% | NDP | Lib | 67.80% | 14,005 | 9,990 | 18,079 | 1,095 | – | – | 601 | 43,770 |
| London South | Lib | NDP | 17,438 | 42.41% | 5,651 | 13.74% | Lib | PC | 65.61% | 17,438 | 11,787 | 9,828 | 1,427 | – | – | 635 | 41,115 |
| Markham | PC | PC | 25,595 | 49.97% | 10,467 | 20.43% | Lib | NDP | 64.39% | 8,459 | 15,128 | 25,595 | 1,086 | – | 311 | 642 | 51,221 |
| Middlesex | Lib | NDP | 12,522 | 32.62% | 520 | 1.35% | Lib | PC | 68.80% | 12,522 | 12,002 | 8,957 | 4,007 | – | – | 894 | 38,382 |
| Mississauga East | Lib | Lib | 12,448 | 39.29% | 3,271 | 10.32% | NDP | PC | 61.61% | 9,177 | 12,448 | 8,285 | – | – | 1,363 | 411 | 31,684 |
| Mississauga North | Lib | Lib | 12,658 | 37.85% | 1,442 | 4.31% | NDP | PC | 57.77% | 11,216 | 12,658 | 7,990 | – | – | 632 | 946 | 33,442 |
| Mississauga South | PC | PC | 17,126 | 52.45% | 9,547 | 29.24% | NDP | Lib | 65.68% | 7,579 | 6,624 | 17,126 | – | – | – | 1,323 | 32,652 |
| Mississauga West | Lib | Lib | 20,038 | 42.11% | 6,100 | 12.82% | NDP | PC | 59.59% | 13,938 | 20,038 | 11,945 | – | – | 771 | 892 | 47,584 |
| Muskoka—Georgian Bay | Lib | NDP | 13,422 | 40.63% | 2,918 | 8.83% | PC | Lib | 67.65% | 13,422 | 9,105 | 10,504 | – | – | – | – | 33,031 |
| Nepean | Lib | Lib | 13,723 | 42.45% | 3,853 | 11.92% | PC | NDP | 62.91% | 7,453 | 13,723 | 9,870 | – | – | – | 1,282 | 32,328 |
| Niagara Falls | Lib | NDP | 13,884 | 46.37% | 5,905 | 19.72% | Lib | PC | 63.38% | 13,884 | 7,979 | 3,896 | 674 | 3,141 | – | 365 | 29,939 |
| Niagara South | Lib | NDP | 11,161 | 46.56% | 3,929 | 16.39% | Lib | PC | 65.10% | 11,161 | 7,232 | 4,032 | – | 1,547 | – | – | 23,972 |
| Nickel Belt | NDP | NDP | 9,925 | 58.54% | 6,658 | 39.27% | Lib | CoR | 69.07% | 9,925 | 3,267 | 967 | – | 2,796 | – | – | 16,955 |
| Nipissing | PC | PC | 15,469 | 45.85% | 4,724 | 14.00% | Lib | NDP | 70.16% | 7,039 | 10,745 | 15,469 | 488 | – | – | – | 33,741 |
| Norfolk | Lib | NDP | 14,850 | 41.03% | 3,879 | 10.72% | Lib | PC | 67.95% | 14,850 | 10,971 | 10,374 | – | – | – | – | 36,195 |
| Northumberland | Lib | Lib | 11,984 | 33.53% | 1,094 | 3.06% | PC | NDP | 66.93% | 9,581 | 11,984 | 10,890 | 1,213 | 1,677 | – | 395 | 35,740 |
| Oakville South | Lib | PC | 10,949 | 34.98% | 108 | 0.35% | Lib | NDP | 66.73% | 6,423 | 10,841 | 10,949 | 996 | 1,057 | – | 1,038 | 31,304 |
| Oakwood | Lib | NDP | 10,423 | 48.74% | 2,280 | 10.66% | Lib | PC | 67.69% | 10,423 | 8,143 | 1,671 | – | – | – | 1,147 | 21,384 |
| Oriole | Lib | Lib | 10,655 | 41.86% | 2,214 | 8.70% | NDP | PC | 66.13% | 8,441 | 10,655 | 5,435 | – | – | – | 923 | 25,454 |
| Oshawa | NDP | NDP | 16,601 | 61.09% | 11,485 | 42.27% | Lib | PC | 51.99% | 16,601 | 5,116 | 3,871 | – | 1,585 | – | – | 27,173 |
| Ottawa Centre | Lib | NDP | 14,522 | 47.70% | 2,866 | 9.41% | Lib | PC | 67.17% | 14,522 | 11,656 | 2,723 | 809 | – | 160 | 576 | 30,446 |
| Ottawa East | Lib | Lib | 16,363 | 62.41% | 10,260 | 39.13% | NDP | PC | 55.23% | 6,103 | 16,363 | 2,203 | 826 | – | – | 723 | 26,218 |
| Ottawa—Rideau | Lib | Lib | 13,454 | 45.31% | 4,609 | 15.52% | NDP | PC | 59.96% | 8,845 | 13,454 | 5,234 | 1,049 | – | 861 | 252 | 29,695 |
| Ottawa South | Lib | Lib | 13,845 | 45.87% | 6,019 | 19.94% | NDP | PC | 68.56% | 7,826 | 13,845 | 7,399 | 503 | – | – | 612 | 30,185 |
| Ottawa West | Lib | Lib | 13,908 | 41.61% | 4,840 | 14.48% | PC | NDP | 65.68% | 8,391 | 13,908 | 9,068 | – | 1,044 | – | 1,011 | 33,422 |
| Oxford | Lib | NDP | 12,684 | 34.75% | 2,824 | 7.74% | PC | Lib | 67.65% | 12,684 | 9,802 | 9,860 | 3,182 | – | – | 976 | 36,504 |
| Parkdale | Lib | Lib | 8,080 | 46.39% | 523 | 3.00% | NDP | PC | 61.22% | 7,557 | 8,080 | 941 | – | – | 273 | 566 | 17,417 |
| Parry Sound | PC | PC | 10,078 | 43.78% | 4,953 | 21.52% | Lib | Grn | 65.09% | 2,993 | 5,125 | 10,078 | 763 | – | – | 4,061 | 23,020 |
| Perth | Lib | NDP | 11,712 | 36.83% | 2,991 | 9.41% | Lib | PC | 66.24% | 11,712 | 8,721 | 8,600 | 2,769 | – | – | – | 31,802 |
| Peterborough | Lib | NDP | 13,813 | 32.98% | 185 | 0.44% | Lib | PC | 66.65% | 13,813 | 13,628 | 8,884 | 3,652 | 1,586 | – | 325 | 41,888 |
| Port Arthur | Lib | NDP | 11,919 | 42.88% | 1,034 | 3.72% | Lib | PC | 62.22% | 11,919 | 10,885 | 3,854 | 1,140 | – | – | – | 27,798 |
| Prescott and Russell | Lib | Lib | 25,879 | 64.97% | 16,510 | 41.45% | NDP | PC | 59.27% | 9,369 | 25,879 | 2,848 | 1,119 | – | – | 618 | 39,833 |
| Prince Edward—Lennox—South Hastings | Lib | NDP | 9,204 | 33.17% | 905 | 3.26% | PC | Lib | 61.45% | 9,204 | 8,188 | 8,299 | – | 2,061 | – | – | 27,752 |
| Quinte | Lib | Lib | 11,114 | 37.43% | 4,104 | 13.82% | NDP | PC | 59.41% | 7,010 | 11,114 | 5,825 | 2,331 | 3,411 | – | – | 29,691 |
| Rainy River | NDP | NDP | 7,838 | 61.47% | 3,960 | 31.06% | Lib | PC | 66.34% | 7,838 | 3,878 | 1,035 | – | – | – | – | 12,751 |
| Renfrew North | Lib | Lib | 13,082 | 43.32% | 7,166 | 23.73% | NDP | CoR | 65.62% | 5,916 | 13,082 | 4,586 | 1,104 | 5,510 | – | – | 30,198 |
| Riverdale | NDP | NDP | 14,086 | 61.97% | 8,514 | 37.46% | Lib | PC | 62.45% | 14,086 | 5,572 | 1,578 | – | – | – | 1,493 | 22,729 |
| St. Andrew—St. Patrick | Lib | NDP | 10,321 | 34.45% | 1,080 | 3.61% | PC | Lib | 66.89% | 10,321 | 8,938 | 9,241 | – | – | – | 1,456 | 29,956 |
| St. Catharines | Lib | Lib | 11,565 | 38.76% | 936 | 3.14% | NDP | PC | 66.77% | 10,629 | 11,565 | 3,926 | 1,331 | 2,384 | – | – | 29,835 |
| St. Catharines—Brock | Lib | NDP | 9,538 | 34.71% | 1,159 | 4.22% | Lib | PC | 65.85% | 9,538 | 8,379 | 6,969 | 873 | 1,449 | – | 270 | 27,478 |
| St. George—St. David | Lib | Lib | 10,718 | 36.08% | 72 | 0.24% | NDP | PC | 64.63% | 10,646 | 10,718 | 6,955 | 932 | – | – | 455 | 29,706 |
| Sarnia | PC | NDP | 10,860 | 36.71% | 2,320 | 7.84% | Lib | PC | 64.84% | 10,860 | 8,540 | 6,269 | 2,691 | 652 | – | 574 | 29,586 |
| Sault Ste. Marie | NDP | NDP | 14,036 | 36.26% | 697 | 1.80% | Lib | CoR | 68.26% | 14,036 | 13,339 | 3,347 | – | 7,991 | – | – | 38,713 |
| Scarborough—Agincourt | Lib | Lib | 13,347 | 44.32% | 4,707 | 15.63% | PC | NDP | 63.54% | 6,763 | 13,347 | 8,640 | – | – | – | 1,368 | 30,118 |
| Scarborough Centre | Lib | NDP | 12,324 | 45.21% | 3,068 | 11.25% | Lib | PC | 64.45% | 12,324 | 9,256 | 5,682 | – | – | – | – | 27,262 |
| Scarborough East | Lib | NDP | 11,700 | 35.55% | 1,774 | 5.39% | Lib | PC | 63.47% | 11,700 | 9,926 | 9,890 | – | – | 368 | 1,031 | 32,915 |
| Scarborough—Ellesmere | Lib | NDP | 14,036 | 48.20% | 4,619 | 15.86% | Lib | PC | 66.79% | 14,036 | 9,417 | 4,855 | – | – | – | 811 | 29,119 |
| Scarborough North | Lib | Lib | 13,393 | 44.56% | 3,916 | 13.03% | NDP | PC | 57.86% | 9,477 | 13,393 | 5,367 | 1,199 | – | – | 620 | 30,056 |
| Scarborough West | NDP | NDP | 14,340 | 51.16% | 7,819 | 27.90% | Lib | PC | 65.21% | 14,340 | 6,521 | 5,769 | 996 | – | – | 401 | 28,027 |
| Simcoe Centre | Lib | NDP | 15,711 | 37.79% | 2,842 | 6.84% | Lib | PC | 62.46% | 15,711 | 12,869 | 10,013 | – | 2,979 | – | – | 41,572 |
| Simcoe East | PC | PC | 14,828 | 39.65% | 740 | 1.98% | NDP | Lib | 67.46% | 14,088 | 7,219 | 14,828 | – | – | – | 1,263 | 37,398 |
| Simcoe West | PC | PC | 11,710 | 36.49% | 1,840 | 5.73% | NDP | Lib | 63.84% | 9,870 | 7,765 | 11,710 | 2,744 | – | – | – | 32,089 |
| Stormont, Dundas and Glengarry | PC | PC | 11,887 | 40.87% | 3,501 | 12.04% | Lib | NDP | 65.77% | 5,357 | 8,386 | 11,887 | – | 3,452 | – | – | 29,082 |
| Sudbury | Lib | NDP | 13,407 | 41.21% | 3,397 | 10.44% | Lib | CoR | 66.57% | 13,407 | 10,010 | 3,318 | – | 5,795 | – | – | 32,530 |
| Sudbury East | NDP | NDP | 17,536 | 58.00% | 10,052 | 33.25% | Lib | CoR | 70.87% | 17,536 | 7,484 | 1,458 | – | 3,754 | – | – | 30,232 |
| Timiskaming | Lib | Lib | 8,364 | 42.29% | 2,173 | 10.99% | NDP | PC | 67.57% | 6,191 | 8,364 | 2,261 | – | 2,250 | – | 713 | 19,779 |
| Victoria—Haliburton | Lib | NDP | 15,467 | 44.33% | 6,520 | 18.69% | PC | Lib | 69.10% | 15,467 | 7,668 | 8,947 | 1,419 | – | 971 | 417 | 34,889 |
| Waterloo North | Lib | PC | 14,552 | 37.43% | 3,254 | 8.37% | NDP | Lib | 62.03% | 11,298 | 9,441 | 14,552 | 2,946 | – | – | 646 | 38,883 |
| Welland-Thorold | NDP | NDP | 20,488 | 63.62% | 12,931 | 40.16% | Lib | PC | 69.80% | 20,488 | 7,557 | 2,893 | – | 878 | – | 386 | 32,202 |
| Wellington | PC | PC | 12,141 | 39.62% | 1,304 | 4.26% | NDP | Lib | 66.44% | 10,837 | 7,668 | 12,141 | – | – | – | – | 30,646 |
| Wentworth East | Lib | NDP | 15,224 | 44.63% | 3,147 | 9.23% | Lib | PC | 66.82% | 15,224 | 12,077 | 5,609 | – | – | 533 | 668 | 34,111 |
| Wentworth North | Lib | NDP | 11,472 | 34.05% | 88 | 0.26% | Lib | PC | 69.63% | 11,472 | 11,384 | 8,740 | 1,236 | 860 | – | – | 33,692 |
| Willowdale | Lib | PC | 11,957 | 35.20% | 834 | 2.46% | Lib | NDP | 63.33% | 9,125 | 11,123 | 11,957 | 1,074 | – | – | 688 | 33,967 |
| Wilson Heights | Lib | Lib | 12,272 | 44.26% | 2,654 | 9.57% | NDP | PC | 62.99% | 9,618 | 12,272 | 4,913 | – | – | – | 922 | 27,725 |
| Windsor—Riverside | NDP | NDP | 21,144 | 71.03% | 14,504 | 48.72% | Lib | PC | 62.16% | 21,144 | 6,640 | 1,096 | 889 | – | – | – | 29,769 |
| Windsor—Sandwich | Lib | NDP | 15,952 | 54.45% | 4,145 | 14.15% | Lib | PC | 58.96% | 15,952 | 11,807 | 1,186 | – | – | 353 | – | 29,298 |
| Windsor—Walkerville | Lib | NDP | 15,899 | 55.19% | 4,318 | 14.99% | Lib | PC | 59.74% | 15,899 | 11,581 | 1,327 | – | – | – | – | 28,807 |
| York Centre | Lib | Lib | 28,056 | 45.57% | 9,206 | 14.95% | NDP | PC | 61.85% | 18,850 | 28,056 | 14,656 | – | – | – | – | 61,562 |
| York East | Lib | NDP | 10,689 | 35.81% | 789 | 2.64% | Lib | PC | 68.03% | 10,689 | 9,900 | 8,021 | – | – | 380 | 858 | 29,848 |
| York Mills | Lib | PC | 13,037 | 44.64% | 2,647 | 9.06% | Lib | NDP | 68.30% | 4,830 | 10,390 | 13,037 | – | – | – | 950 | 29,207 |
| York North | Lib | Lib | 11,452 | 34.25% | 148 | 0.44% | PC | NDP | 63.14% | 10,681 | 11,452 | 11,304 | – | – | – | – | 33,437 |
| York South | NDP | NDP | 16,642 | 66.70% | 12,108 | 48.53% | Lib | PC | 66.80% | 16,642 | 4,534 | 2,561 | – | – | – | 1,212 | 24,949 |
| Yorkview | Lib | NDP | 9,945 | 49.58% | 1,619 | 8.07% | Lib | PC | 61.11% | 9,945 | 8,326 | 1,254 | – | – | 231 | 303 | 20,059 |

= open seat
= turnout is above provincial average
= winning candidate was in previous Legislature
= not incumbent; was previously elected to the Legislature
= incumbent had switched allegiance
= incumbency arose from byelection gain
= previously incumbent in another riding
= other incumbents renominated
= previously an MP in the House of Commons of Canada
= multiple candidates

=== Comparative analysis for ridings (1990 vs 1987) ===
Summary of riding results by turnout and vote share for winning candidate (vs 1987) (Note: Summarized from "Data Explorer". Elections Ontario.)
| Riding and winning party | | | Turnout | | Vote share | |
| Riding and winning party | | | % | Change (pp) | % | Change (pp) |
|---|---|---|---|---|---|---|
| Algoma | NDP | Hold | 65.62 | -3.19 | 58.65 | -2.25 |
| Algoma—Manitoulin | Lib | Hold | 61.25 | -0.89 | 38.86 | -7.19 |
| Beaches—Woodbine | NDP | Hold | 65.95 | 4.12 | 58.35 | 8.61 |
| Brampton North | Lib | Hold | 58.35 | 4.21 | 34.92 | -15.90 |
| Brampton South | Lib | Hold | 59.36 | 4.11 | 32.31 | -20.27 |
| Brantford | NDP | Gain | 66.71 | -2.18 | 48.63 | 15.11 |
| Brant—Haldimand | Lib | Hold | 61.18 | 4.35 | 37.35 | -22.00 |
| Bruce | Lib | Hold | 68.92 | 1.24 | 37.71 | -23.02 |
| Burlington South | PC | Hold | 69.48 | 1.78 | 52.53 | 11.21 |
| Cambridge | NDP | Hold | 64.84 | 1.91 | 60.28 | 25.79 |
| Carleton | PC | Hold | 65.15 | -0.07 | 46.91 | 3.30 |
| Carleton East | Lib | Hold | 63.52 | 2.61 | 53.88 | -10.21 |
| Chatham—Kent | NDP | Gain | 63.01 | 3.41 | 44.74 | 18.28 |
| Cochrane North | NDP | Gain | 62.16 | -1.03 | 40.47 | 5.68 |
| Cochrane South | NDP | Gain | 62.95 | 0.59 | 47.61 | 21.73 |
| Cornwall | Lib | Hold | 63.79 | -0.54 | 46.53 | 6.30 |
| Don Mills | NDP | Gain | 64.23 | 5.10 | 34.20 | 10.61 |
| Dovercourt | NDP | Gain | 66.27 | -1.75 | 54.25 | 9.27 |
| Downsview | NDP | Gain | 66.08 | 2.90 | 56.58 | 10.46 |
| Dufferin—Peel | PC | Gain | 66.56 | 3.58 | 34.66 | 3.36 |
| Durham Centre | NDP | Gain | 61.23 | -0.22 | 35.88 | 4.94 |
| Durham East | NDP | Gain | 63.43 | 2.72 | 32.74 | 8.41 |
| Durham West | NDP | Gain | 62.36 | 3.20 | 37.47 | 20.62 |
| Durham—York | NDP | Gain | 61.90 | 3.19 | 33.89 | 15.92 |
| Eglinton | Lib | Hold | 69.98 | 2.25 | 35.97 | -8.77 |
| Elgin | NDP | Gain | 66.51 | -0.26 | 41.67 | 17.99 |
| Essex-Kent | NDP | Gain | 67.52 | 2.21 | 52.66 | 11.67 |
| Essex South | Lib | Hold | 59.40 | 4.16 | 36.02 | -22.92 |
| Etobicoke—Humber | Lib | Hold | 70.29 | 3.70 | 38.61 | -22.44 |
| Etobicoke—Lakeshore | NDP | Hold | 66.15 | 0.27 | 57.23 | 12.64 |
| Etobicoke—Rexdale | NDP | Hold | 61.42 | 1.41 | 67.07 | 15.03 |
| Etobicoke West | PC | Gain | 69.86 | 3.88 | 40.56 | 11.79 |
| Fort William | Lib | Hold | 62.74 | -4.95 | 44.44 | 5.97 |
| Fort York | NDP | Gain | 63.48 | 5.04 | 46.30 | 3.95 |
| Frontenac—Addington | NDP | Gain | 65.15 | 4.02 | 33.24 | 13.01 |
| Grey | PC | Gain | 65.20 | 0.96 | 36.11 | 0.31 |
| Guelph | NDP | Gain | 69.48 | 7.25 | 37.91 | 10.70 |
| Halton Centre | Lib | Hold | 63.12 | 3.72 | 35.03 | -18.00 |
| Halton North | NDP | Gain | 64.50 | 6.96 | 30.94 | 7.15 |
| Hamilton Centre | NDP | Gain | 59.78 | 1.02 | 55.32 | 16.43 |
| Hamilton East | NDP | Hold | 61.70 | 1.45 | 71.60 | 14.78 |
| Hamilton Mountain | NDP | Hold | 66.55 | 0.64 | 59.76 | 16.95 |
| Hamilton West | NDP | Hold | 67.90 | 2.95 | 56.59 | 14.13 |
| Hastings—Peterborough | NDP | Gain | 68.76 | 2.61 | 39.89 | 13.78 |
| High Park—Swansea | NDP | Gain | 64.83 | -0.11 | 45.12 | 13.69 |
| Huron | NDP | Gain | 71.47 | 3.90 | 34.47 | 20.06 |
| Kenora | Lib | Hold | 61.67 | -0.48 | 40.55 | 0.04 |
| Kingston and the Islands | NDP | Gain | 57.00 | 0.69 | 37.99 | 13.33 |
| Kitchener | NDP | Gain | 62.90 | 6.31 | 46.82 | 18.29 |
| Kitchener—Wilmot | NDP | Gain | 60.09 | 4.59 | 43.94 | 19.64 |
| Lake Nipigon | NDP | Hold | 59.98 | -4.55 | 65.19 | 1.12 |
| Lambton | NDP | Gain | 68.17 | 1.46 | 31.40 | 19.99 |
| Lanark—Renfrew | PC | Hold | 60.37 | -0.50 | 32.48 | -10.26 |
| Lawrence | Lib | Hold | 65.68 | -1.34 | 44.70 | -8.32 |
| Leeds—Grenville | PC | Hold | 66.18 | -2.33 | 49.07 | 5.89 |
| Lincoln | NDP | Gain | 68.07 | 2.73 | 35.49 | 14.67 |
| London Centre | NDP | Gain | 66.05 | 9.37 | 51.31 | 23.21 |
| London North | PC | Gain | 67.80 | 4.02 | 41.30 | 22.78 |
| London South | NDP | Gain | 65.61 | 3.06 | 42.41 | 22.84 |
| Markham | PC | Hold | 64.39 | 3.78 | 49.97 | 5.77 |
| Middlesex | NDP | Gain | 68.80 | 2.91 | 32.62 | 15.89 |
| Mississauga East | Lib | Hold | 61.61 | 1.74 | 39.29 | -11.10 |
| Mississauga North | Lib | Hold | 57.77 | 3.79 | 37.85 | -18.18 |
| Mississauga South | PC | Hold | 65.68 | 0.78 | 52.45 | 10.21 |
| Mississauga West | Lib | Hold | 59.59 | 2.91 | 42.11 | -18.25 |
| Muskoka—Georgian Bay | NDP | Gain | 67.65 | 2.49 | 40.63 | 16.38 |
| Nepean | Lib | Hold | 62.91 | 0.43 | 42.45 | -6.01 |
| Niagara Falls | NDP | Gain | 63.38 | 5.40 | 46.37 | 16.54 |
| Niagara South | NDP | Gain | 65.10 | 8.91 | 46.56 | 25.40 |
| Nickel Belt | NDP | Hold | 69.07 | -1.15 | 58.54 | 0.33 |
| Nipissing | PC | Hold | 70.16 | 1.35 | 45.85 | -4.83 |
| Norfolk | NDP | Gain | 67.95 | 4.92 | 41.03 | 14.45 |
| Northumberland | Lib | Hold | 66.93 | -0.04 | 33.53 | -10.29 |
| Oakville South | PC | Gain | 66.73 | 1.91 | 34.98 | -5.36 |
| Oakwood | NDP | Gain | 67.69 | 0.40 | 48.74 | 6.20 |
| Oriole | Lib | Hold | 66.13 | 1.12 | 41.86 | -17.82 |
| Oshawa | NDP | Hold | 51.99 | -2.08 | 61.09 | 15.24 |
| Ottawa Centre | NDP | Gain | 67.17 | 4.00 | 47.70 | 7.63 |
| Ottawa East | Lib | Hold | 55.23 | 2.17 | 62.41 | -11.85 |
| Ottawa—Rideau | Lib | Hold | 59.96 | 0.54 | 45.31 | -4.89 |
| Ottawa South | Lib | Hold | 68.56 | 0.91 | 45.87 | -5.01 |
| Ottawa West | Lib | Hold | 65.68 | 4.08 | 41.61 | -8.85 |
| Oxford | NDP | Gain | 67.65 | -0.59 | 34.75 | 16.13 |
| Parkdale | Lib | Hold | 61.22 | -1.31 | 46.39 | -23.07 |
| Parry Sound | PC | Hold | 65.09 | 0.84 | 43.78 | -9.81 |
| Perth | NDP | Gain | 66.24 | 3.09 | 36.83 | 16.20 |
| Peterborough | NDP | Gain | 66.65 | 2.91 | 32.98 | 4.69 |
| Port Arthur | NDP | Gain | 62.22 | -5.63 | 42.88 | 3.44 |
| Prescott and Russell | Lib | Hold | 59.27 | -0.79 | 64.97 | -10.83 |
| Prince Edward—Lennox—South Hastings | NDP | Gain | 61.45 | 0.22 | 33.17 | 15.38 |
| Quinte | Lib | Hold | 59.41 | 2.19 | 37.43 | -24.65 |
| Rainy River | NDP | Hold | 66.34 | -5.20 | 61.47 | 20.92 |
| Renfrew North | Lib | Hold | 65.62 | -1.54 | 43.32 | -19.41 |
| Riverdale | NDP | Hold | 62.45 | 1.42 | 61.97 | 17.08 |
| St. Andrew—St. Patrick | NDP | Gain | 66.89 | 2.38 | 34.45 | 16.37 |
| St. Catharines | Lib | Hold | 66.77 | 4.28 | 38.76 | -24.54 |
| St. Catharines—Brock | NDP | Gain | 65.85 | 2.44 | 34.71 | 9.81 |
| St. George—St. David | Lib | Hold | 64.63 | 2.74 | 36.08 | -15.07 |
| Sarnia | NDP | Gain | 64.84 | -0.83 | 36.71 | 21.46 |
| Sault Ste. Marie | NDP | Hold | 68.26 | -2.15 | 36.26 | -12.74 |
| Scarborough—Agincourt | Lib | Hold | 63.54 | 0.12 | 44.32 | -13.22 |
| Scarborough Centre | NDP | Gain | 64.45 | -0.14 | 45.21 | 15.85 |
| Scarborough East | NDP | Gain | 63.47 | 4.23 | 35.55 | 12.50 |
| Scarborough—Ellesmere | NDP | Gain | 66.79 | 3.08 | 48.20 | 8.14 |
| Scarborough North | Lib | Hold | 57.86 | -1.99 | 44.56 | -18.47 |
| Scarborough West | NDP | Hold | 65.21 | 3.61 | 51.16 | 4.92 |
| Simcoe Centre | NDP | Gain | 62.46 | -0.01 | 37.79 | 17.45 |
| Simcoe East | PC | Hold | 67.46 | 0.49 | 39.65 | 2.74 |
| Simcoe West | PC | Hold | 63.84 | 2.79 | 36.49 | -5.46 |
| Stormont, Dundas and Glengarry | PC | Hold | 65.77 | -1.26 | 40.87 | 2.49 |
| Sudbury | NDP | Gain | 66.57 | -0.84 | 41.21 | 12.71 |
| Sudbury East | NDP | Hold | 70.87 | 2.62 | 58.00 | 3.03 |
| Timiskaming | Lib | Hold | 67.57 | -2.42 | 42.29 | -6.58 |
| Victoria—Haliburton | NDP | Gain | 69.10 | 6.13 | 44.33 | 29.57 |
| Waterloo North | PC | Gain | 62.03 | 5.10 | 37.43 | 10.36 |
| Welland-Thorold | NDP | Hold | 69.80 | 1.12 | 63.62 | 5.74 |
| Wellington | PC | Hold | 66.44 | 3.91 | 39.62 | -1.45 |
| Wentworth East | NDP | Gain | 66.82 | 2.50 | 44.63 | 16.54 |
| Wentworth North | NDP | Gain | 69.63 | 4.63 | 34.05 | 11.84 |
| Willowdale | PC | Gain | 63.33 | 0.00 | 35.20 | 1.16 |
| Wilson Heights | Lib | Hold | 62.99 | -0.17 | 44.26 | -13.23 |
| Windsor—Riverside | NDP | Hold | 62.16 | -3.05 | 71.03 | 13.38 |
| Windsor—Sandwich | NDP | Gain | 58.96 | 0.04 | 54.45 | 11.79 |
| Windsor—Walkerville | NDP | Gain | 59.74 | -3.62 | 55.19 | 9.97 |
| York Centre | Lib | Hold | 61.85 | 6.26 | 45.57 | -16.87 |
| York East | NDP | Gain | 68.03 | 3.37 | 35.81 | 12.77 |
| York Mills | PC | Gain | 68.30 | 0.53 | 44.64 | 4.75 |
| York North | Lib | Hold | 63.14 | 3.11 | 34.25 | -14.20 |
| York South | NDP | Hold | 66.80 | -3.66 | 66.70 | 19.60 |
| Yorkview | NDP | Gain | 61.11 | -0.23 | 49.58 | 21.40 |

=== MPPs elected by region and riding ===
Party designations are as follows:

Liberal
NDP
PC

Two-tone colour boxes indicate ridings that turned over from the 1987 election, eg:

(Liberal in 1987 and NDP in 1990)

Northern Ontario

Algoma: Bud Wildman
Algoma—Manitoulin: Mike Brown
Cochrane North: Len Wood
Cochrane South: Gilles Bisson
Fort William: Lyn McLeod
Kenora: Frank Miclash
Lake Nipigon: Gilles Pouliot
Nickel Belt: Floyd Laughren
Nipissing: Mike Harris
Port Arthur: Shelley Wark-Martyn
Rainy River: Howard Hampton
Sault Ste. Marie: Tony Martin
Sudbury: Sharon Murdock
Sudbury East: Shelley Martel
Timiskaming: David Ramsay

Ottawa Valley

Carleton: Norm Sterling
Carleton East: Gilles Morin
Lanark—Renfrew: Leo Jordan
Nepean: Hans Daigeler
Ottawa Centre: Evelyn Gigantes
Ottawa East: Bernard Grandmaître
Ottawa South: Dalton McGuinty
Ottawa West: Bob Chiarelli
Ottawa—Rideau: Yvonne O'Neill
Prescott and Russell: Jean Poirier
Renfrew North: Sean Conway

Saint Lawrence Valley

Cornwall: John Cleary
Kingston and the Islands: Gary Wilson
Leeds—Grenville: Bob Runciman
Stormont, Dundas and Glengarry: Noble Villeneuve

Central Ontario

Frontenac—Addington: Fred Wilson
Hastings—Peterborough: Elmer Buchanan
Northumberland: Joan Fawcett
Peterborough: Jenny Carter
Prince Edward—Lennox—South Hastings: Paul Johnson
Quinte: Hugh O'Neil
Victoria—Haliburton: Dennis Drainville

Georgian Bay

Bruce: Murray Elston
Grey: Bill Murdoch
Muskoka—Georgian Bay: Dan Waters
Parry Sound: Ernie Eves
Simcoe Centre: Paul Wessenger
Simcoe East: Al McLean
Simcoe West: Jim Wilson

Hamilton/Halton/Niagara

Burlington South: Cam Jackson
Halton Centre: Barbara Sullivan
Halton North: Noel Duignan
Hamilton Centre: David Christopherson
Hamilton East: Bob Mackenzie
Hamilton Mountain: Brian Charlton
Hamilton West: Richard Allen
Lincoln: Ron Hansen
Niagara Falls: Margaret Harrington
Niagara South: Shirley Coppen
Oakville South: Gary Carr
St. Catharines: Jim Bradley
St. Catharines—Brock: Christel Haeck
Welland—Thorold: Peter Kormos
Wentworth East: Mark Morrow
Wentworth North: Donald Abel

Midwestern Ontario

Brant—Haldimand: Robert Nixon
Brantford: Brad Ward
Cambridge: Mike Farnan
Dufferin—Peel: David Tilson
Guelph: Derek Fletcher
Huron: Paul Klopp
Kitchener: Will Ferguson
Kitchener—Wilmot: Mike Cooper
Norfolk: Norman Jamison
Oxford: Kimble Sutherland
Perth: Karen Haslam
Waterloo North: Elizabeth Witmer
Wellington: Ted Arnott

Southwestern Ontario

Chatham—Kent: Randy Hope
Elgin: Peter North
Essex South: Remo Mancini
Essex—Kent: Patrick Hayes
Lambton: Ellen MacKinnon
London Centre: Marion Boyd
London North: Dianne Cunningham
London South: David Winninger
Middlesex: Irene Mathyssen
Sarnia: Bob Huget
Windsor—Riverside: Dave Cooke
Windsor—Sandwich: George Dadamo
Windsor—Walkerville: Wayne Lessard

Peel/York/Durham

Brampton North: Carman McClelland
Brampton South: Bob Callahan
Durham Centre: Drummond White
Durham East: Gord Mills
Durham West: Jim Wiseman
Durham—York: Larry O'Connor
Markham: Don Cousens
Mississauga East: John Sola
Mississauga North: Steven Offer
Mississauga South: Margaret Marland
Mississauga West: Steve Mahoney
Oshawa: Allan Pilkey
York Centre: Greg Sorbara
York North: Charles Beer

Metropolitan Toronto

Beaches—Woodbine: Frances Lankin
Don Mills: Margery Ward
Dovercourt: Tony Silipo
Downsview: Anthony Perruzza
Eglinton: Dianne Poole
Etobicoke West: Chris Stockwell
Etobicoke—Humber: Jim Henderson
Etobicoke—Lakeshore: Ruth Grier
Etobicoke—Rexdale: Ed Philip
Fort York: Rosario Marchese
High Park—Swansea: Elaine Ziemba
Lawrence: Joseph Cordiano
Oakwood: Tony Rizzo
Oriole: Elinor Caplan
Parkdale: Tony Ruprecht
Riverdale: Marilyn Churley
Scarborough—Agincourt: Gerry Phillips
Scarborough Centre: Steve Owens
Scarborough East: Bob Frankford
Scarborough—Ellesmere: David Warner
Scarborough North: Alvin Curling
Scarborough West: Anne Swarbrick
St. Andrew—St. Patrick: Zanana Akande
St. George—St. David: Ian Scott
Willowdale: Charles Harnick
Wilson Heights: Monte Kwinter
York East: Gary Malkowski
York Mills: David Turnbull
York South: Bob Rae
Yorkview: George Mammoliti

=== Summary analysis ===
Party candidates in 2nd place
| Party in 1st place | Party in 2nd place | | | Total |
| Party in 1st place | NDP | Liberal | PC | Total |
|---|---|---|---|---|
| New Democratic | | 64 | 10 | 74 |
| Liberal | 29 | | 7 | 36 |
| Progressive Conservative | 8 | 12 | | 20 |
| Total | 37 | 76 | 17 | 130 |

Principal races, according to 1st and 2nd-place results
| Parties | | Seats |
|---|---|---|
| █ New Democratic | █ Liberal | 93 |
| █ New Democratic | █ Progressive Conservative | 18 |
| █ Progressive Conservative | █ Liberal | 19 |
| Total | | 130 |

Candidates ranked 1st to 5th place, by party
| Parties | 1st | 2nd | 3rd | 4th | 5th | Total |
|---|---|---|---|---|---|---|
| █ New Democratic | 74 | 37 | 18 | 1 | | 130 |
| █ Liberal | 36 | 76 | 18 | | | 130 |
| █ Progressive Conservative | 20 | 17 | 84 | 9 | | 130 |
| █ Confederation of Regions | | | 8 | 17 | 7 | 32 |
| █ Green | | | 1 | 15 | 21 | 37 |
| █ Independent | | | 1 | 4 | 10 | 15 |
| █ Family Coalition | | | | 57 | 9 | 66 |
| █ Libertarian | | | | 13 | 19 | 32 |
| █ Freedom | | | | 1 | 7 | 8 |
| █ Communist | | | | | 1 | 1 |

=== Seats changing hands ===
Of the 130 seats, 20 were open because of MPPs who chose not to stand for reelection, and voters in 63 seats changed allegiance from the previous election in 1987.

Elections to the 35th Legislative Assembly of Ontario – seats won/lost by party, 1987–1990
| Party | 1987 | Gain from (loss to) | | | | | | 1990 |
| Party | 1987 | NDP | | Lib | | PC | | 1990 |
|---|---|---|---|---|---|---|---|---|
| New Democratic | 19 | | | 51 | | 4 | | 74 |
| Liberal | 95 | | (51) | | | | (8) | 36 |
| Progressive Conservative | 16 | | (4) | 8 | | | | 20 |
| Total | 130 | – | (55) | 59 | – | 4 | (8) | 130 |

The following seats changed allegiance from 1987:

Liberal to NDP

- Brantford
- Chatham—Kent
- Cochrane North
- Don Mills
- Dovercourt
- Downsview
- Durham Centre
- Durham West
- Durham—York
- Elgin
- Essex—Kent
- Fort York
- Frontenac—Addington
- Guelph
- Halton North
- Hamilton Centre
- High Park—Swansea
- Huron
- Kingston and the Islands
- Kitchener
- Kitchener—Wilmot
- Lambton
- Lincoln
- London Centre
- London South
- Middlesex
- Muskoka—Georgian Bay
- Niagara Falls
- Niagara South
- Norfolk
- Oakwood
- Ottawa Centre
- Oxford
- Perth
- Peterborough
- Port Arthur
- Prince Edward—Lennox—South—Hastings
- Scarborough Centre
- Scarborough East
- Scarborough—Ellesmere
- Simcoe Centre
- St. Andrew—St. Patrick
- St. Catharines—Brock
- Sudbury
- Victoria—Haliburton
- Wentworth East
- Wentworth North
- Windsor—Sandwich
- Windsor—Walkerville
- York East
- Yorkview

Liberal to PC

- Dufferin—Peel
- Etobicoke West
- Grey
- London North
- Oakville South
- Waterloo North
- Willowdale
- York Mills

PC to NDP

- Cochrane South
- Durham East
- Hastings—Peterborough
- Sarnia

Resulting composition of the 35th Legislative Assembly of Ontario
| Source | | Party | | | |
|---|---|---|---|---|---|
| Source | | NDP | Lib | PC | Total |
| Seats retained | Incumbents returned | 14 | 35 | 9 | 58 |
| Seats retained | Open seats held | 5 | 1 | 3 | 9 |
| Seats changing hands | Incumbents defeated | 45 | | 6 | 51 |
| Seats changing hands | Open seats gained | 10 | | 1 | 11 |
| Seats changing hands | Byelection gains held | | | 1 | 1 |
| Total | | 74 | 36 | 20 | 130 |

=== Significant results among independent and minor party candidates ===
Those candidates not belonging to a major party, receiving more than 1,000 votes in the election, are listed below:

| Riding | Party | Candidates | Votes | Placed |
|---|---|---|---|---|
| Dufferin—Peel | █ Libertarian | Bob Shapton | 1,594 | 4th |
| Frontenac—Addington | █ Independent | Ross Baker | 1,021 | 5th |
| Kenora | █ Independent | Henry Wetelainen | 2,357 | 3rd |
| Mississauga East | █ Independent | Peter Sesek | 1,363 | 4th |
| Mississauga South | █ Green | Scott McWhinnie | 1,323 | 4th |
| Oakville South | █ Green | Josef Petriska | 1,038 | 5th |
| Ottawa West | █ Green | Ian Whyte | 1,011 | 5th |
| Parry Sound | █ Green | Richard Thomas | 4,061 | 3rd |
| St. Andrew—St. Patrick | █ Green | James Harris | 1,112 | 4th |
| Scarborough—Agincourt | █ Libertarian | William Galster | 1,368 | 4th |
| Simcoe East | █ Libertarian | John McLean | 1,263 | 4th |

== Post-election changes ==
=== Party affiliation switches ===
Tony Rizzo (NDP) became an independent MPP on October 10, 1990, after questions were raised about labour practices in his bricklaying firms. He would later rejoin the NDP caucus.

Dennis Drainville (NDP) became an independent MPP on April 28, 1993, as a protest against the Rae government's plans to introduce casinos to the province. He later resigned his seat in the legislature, resulting in a by-election.

Will Ferguson (NDP) became an independent MPP on April 30, 1993, following accusations relating to the Grandview scandal. He later rejoined the NDP caucus on June 21, 1994, having been cleared of all charges.

John Sola (L) became an independent MPP on May 11, 1993, after making comments about Canadian Serbs that most regarded as racist.

Peter North (NDP) became an independent MPP on October 27, 1993, claiming he had lost confidence in the Rae government. He tried to join the Progressive Conservatives, but was rebuffed.

=== Byelections ===
Due to resignations, five by-elections were held between the 1990 and 1995 elections.

| Electoral district | Candidates | | | | Incumbent |
| Electoral district | Liberal | PC | NDP | Other | Incumbent |
|---|---|---|---|---|---|
| Brant—Haldimand; March 5, 1992 | Ronald Eddy; 9,565 | David Timms; 4,758 | Christopher Stanek; 2,895 | Donald Pennell (FCP); 2,056; Ella Haley (G); 759; Janice Wilson (Ind); 250 | Robert Nixon resigned July 31, 1991 |
| Don Mills; April 1, 1993 | Murad Velshi; 5,583 | David Johnson; 9,143 | Chandran Mylvaganam; 1,513 | Diane Johnston (Ind Renewal); 498; Denise Mountenay (FCP); 383; Bernadette Michael (Ind); 206; David Pengelly (F); 161; Sat Khalsa (G); 141 | Margery Ward died January 22, 1993 |
| St. George—St. David; April 1, 1993 | Tim Murphy; 8,750 | Nancy Jackman; 6,518 | George Lamony; 1,451 | Louis Di Rocco (FCP); 347; Phil Sarazen (G); 209; Judith Snow (Ind Renewal); 119; Ed Fortune (Ind); 107; Robert Smith (Ind); 72; John Steele (Comm League); 57 | Ian Scott resigned September 8, 1992 |
| Essex South; December 2, 1993 | Bruce Crozier; 12,736 | Joan Flood; 3,295 | David Maris; 1,100 | Joyce Ann Cherry (FCP); 1,060; Michael Green (G); 132; John Turmel (Ind); 84 | Remo Mancini resigned May 10, 1993 |
| Victoria—Haliburton; March 17, 1994 | Sharon McCrae; 9,571 | Chris Hodgson; 11,941 | Art Field; 1,378 | Ron Hawkrigg (Lbt); 252; Bradley Bradamore (Ind); 217; John Turmel (Ind); 123 | Dennis Drainville resigned September 27, 1993 |

=== Vacancies ===
In addition, four seats were vacant in the final months of the legislature, as the sitting members resigned and by-elections were not held to replace them before the 1995 election:

- Bruce — Murray Elston (L) resigned October 31, 1994
- Kitchener — Will Ferguson (NDP) resigned October 8, 1994
- Markham — Don Cousens (PC) resigned September 30, 1994
- St. Andrew—St. Patrick — Zanana Akande (NDP) resigned August 31, 1994

== See also ==
- Politics of Ontario
- List of Ontario political parties
- Ontario Libertarian Party candidates, 1990 Ontario provincial election
- Premier of Ontario
- Leader of the Opposition (Ontario)
