= Elinor Caplan =

Canadian politician

The Honourable Elinor Caplan PC ECO
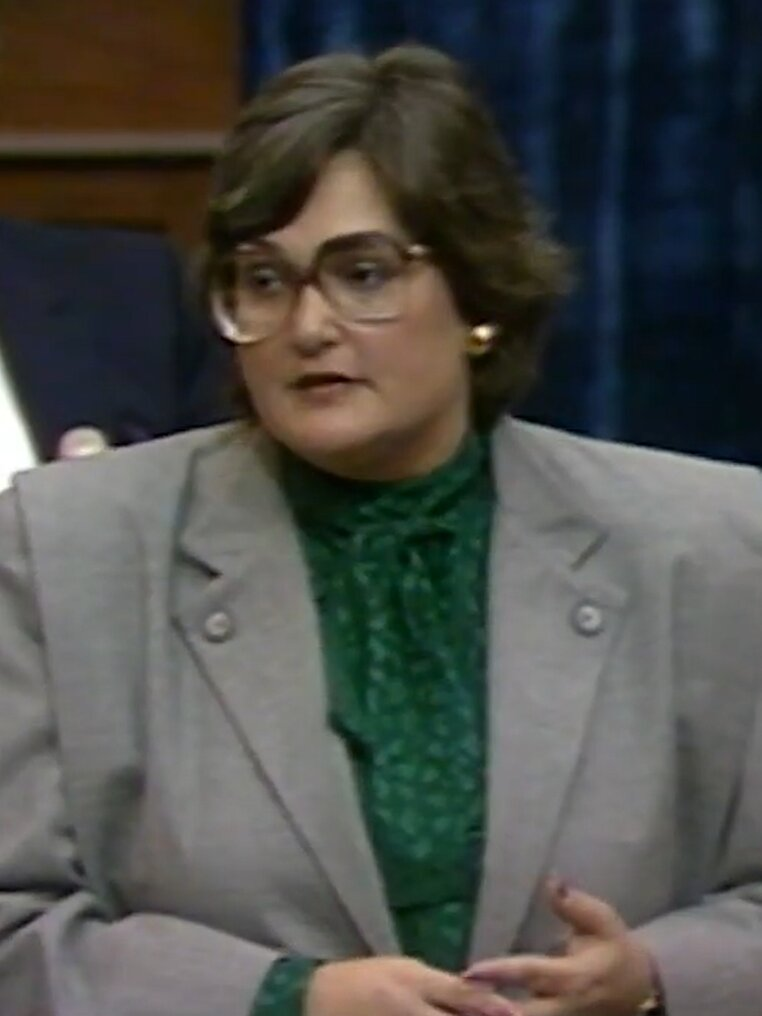
- Caplan in 1986

Member of Parliament for Thornhill
- In office 1997–2004
- Preceded by: New riding
- Succeeded by: Susan Kadis

Member of the Ontario Provincial Parliament for Oriole
- In office 1985–1997
- Preceded by: John Reesor Williams
- Succeeded by: David Caplan

Personal details
- Born: Elinor Hershorn; May 20, 1944 (age 82) Toronto, Ontario, Canada
- Party: Liberal
- Spouse: Mayer Wilfred Caplan (b. 1935, m. 1963)
- Children: David Caplan (1964-2019), Mark Caplan, Meredith Caplan Jamieson, Zane Caplansky
- Profession: politician

Elinor Caplan PC (born May 20, 1944) is a businesswoman and former politician in Ontario, Canada. She served in the Legislative Assembly of Ontario from 1985 to 1997, and was a Member of Parliament in the House of Commons of Canada from 1997 to 2004. A Liberal, she served as a cabinet minister in the provincial government of David Peterson and the federal government of Jean Chrétien.

== Background ==
She was born in Toronto to Samuel S. Hershorn, a textile manufacturer, and his wife Thelma (Goodman) Hershorn, both of whose families had come to Canada from Russian Poland. Caplan attended Oakwood Collegiate Institute in Toronto, and then Centennial College. She then worked in real estate heading Elinor Caplan and Associates from 1973 to 1978. Her husband, Wilfred, sought election to the provincial legislature in the 1977 election, but was defeated. Caplan is Jewish, and is a longtime member of Canadian Hadassah-WIZO, a women's Zionist organization.

== Politics ==
=== Municipal ===
She ran for office in 1978, when she was elected to the North York municipal council as an alderman.

=== Provincial ===
She ran for the provincial legislature in the 1981 election, but lost to Progressive Conservative David Rotenberg in the constituency of Wilson Heights.

She was elected to the Ontario legislature in the 1985 election, defeating Progressive Conservative incumbent John Williams by over 4,000 votes in the North York riding of Oriole. The Liberal Party formed a minority government after this election, and Caplan was appointed as Chair of the Management Board of Cabinet on June 26, 1985. She resigned her portfolio on June 16, 1986, following accusations of a conflict of interest relating to her husband's business dealings; while protesting her innocence, she claimed she had lost the confidence of the house. Caplan was subsequently exonerated by a parliamentary commission.

Caplan won a landslide re-election victory in the provincial election of 1987, She was reappointed to Peterson's cabinet on September 29, 1987, as Minister of Health. She held this position until the Liberals were defeated by the Ontario New Democratic Party in the 1990 election. Caplan defeated NDP candidate Lennox Farrell by just over 2,000 votes in the 1990 campaign, and remained a prominent figure in the official opposition, serving as Deputy House Leader in 1994–95.

In the 1995 election, Caplan narrowly retained her seat against a challenge from Progressive Conservative Paul Sutherland. She served as Chief Opposition Whip from 1995 to 1996, and retired from the legislature on May 1, 1997. (She was succeeded as the MPP for Oriole by her son, David Caplan, who went on to serve as a cabinet minister in the government of Dalton McGuinty.) In 1996, she supported Joseph Cordiano for the leadership of the Ontario Liberal Party.

=== Federal politics ===
Caplan was elected to the federal House of Commons in the 1997 election, defeating her closest opponent by more than 14,000 votes in the riding of Thornhill. She served as parliamentary secretary to the Minister of Health in 1998–99, and was appointed to cabinet as Minister of Citizenship and Immigration on August 3, 1999.

In the 2000 federal election, Caplan faced an inexperienced opponent from the Canadian Alliance and was easily re-elected. After a cabinet shuffle on January 15, 2002, Caplan was appointed Minister of National Revenue. She was dropped from cabinet when Paul Martin replaced Chrétien as Prime Minister in December 2003. She did not seek re-election in the 2004 election.

== After politics ==
In late 2004, Ontario Premier Dalton McGuinty appointed Caplan to lead a provincial inquiry into the state of home-care medical services.

== Political offices held ==
Legislative Assembly of Ontario
Preceded by John Reesor Williams	MPP for Oriole; 1985–97	Succeeded by David Caplan
Peterson ministry, Province of Ontario (1985–1990)
Preceded by George Ashe	Chair of Management Board; 1985–86	Succeeded by Robert Nixon
Preceded by Murray Elston	Minister of Health; 1987–90	Succeeded by Evelyn Gigantes
Parliament of Canada
New district	MP for Thornhill; 1997–2004	Succeeded by Susan Kadis
26th Canadian Ministry (1993–2003) – Cabinet of Jean Chrétien
Preceded by Lucienne Robillard	Minister of Citizenship and Immigration; 1999–2002	Succeeded by Denis Coderre
Preceded by Martin Cauchon	Minister of National Revenue; 2002–03	Succeeded by Stan Keyes
