= Oriole (provincial electoral district) =

Former provincial electoral district in Ontario, Canada

Coordinates: 43.7642°N 79.3682°W

Ontario electoral district

Defunct provincial electoral district
- Legislature: Legislative Assembly of Ontario
- District created: 1975
- District abolished: 1996
- First contested: 1975
- Last contested: 1995

Oriole was a provincial electoral district district in North York, Ontario, Canada. It was created from York Mills riding in 1975 and merged into Willowdale and Don Valley East ridings after 1999.

There were three members who represented this riding during its history, most notably Elinor Caplan and her son David Caplan, both of whom held cabinet posts during their incumbency.

== Members of Provincial Parliament ==
Oriole
Assembly	Years	Member	Party
Created from York Mills riding in 1975
30th	1975–1977	John Williams	Progressive Conservative
31st	1977–1981	John Williams	Progressive Conservative
32nd	1981–1985	John Williams	Progressive Conservative
33rd	1985–1987	Elinor Caplan (Note: Resigned her seat on May 1, 1997 in order to run for Federal parliament in riding of Thornhill.)	Liberal
34th	1987–1990	Elinor Caplan	Liberal
35th	1990–1995	Elinor Caplan	Liberal
36th	1995–1997	Elinor Caplan	Liberal
36th	1997–1999	David Caplan	Liberal
Sourced from the Ontario Legislative Assembly
Merged into Willowdale and Don Valley East ridings after 1999

== Election results ==
Ontario provincial by-election, September 4, 1997 Resignation of Elinor Caplan to enter federal politics
Party	Candidate	Votes	%	±%
Liberal	David Caplan	9,954	58.40	+14.69
Progressive Conservative	Barbara Greene	5,163	30.29	–9.37
New Democratic	Jim Kafieh	1,700	9.97	–4.37
Independent	Bernadette Michael	132	0.77	–0.18
Green	Shelly Lipsey	96	0.56	+0.11
Total valid votes		17,045	99.32	
Total rejected, unmarked and declined ballots		116	0.68	–0.22
Turnout		17,161	46.48	–21.91
Eligible voters		36,924		
Liberal hold		Swing		+12.03
Source: Elections Ontario

1995 Ontario general election
Party	Candidate	Votes	%	±%
Liberal	Elinor Caplan	11,164	43.70	+1.85
Progressive Conservative	Paul Sutherland	10,130	39.66	+18.30
New Democratic	David Cox	3,665	14.35	–18.81
Independent	Bernadette Michael	243	0.95	–
Natural Law	Donna Anderson	227	0.89	–
Green	Don Roebuck	115	0.45	–0.91
Total valid votes		25,544	99.11	
Total rejected, unmarked and declined ballots		230	0.89	–0.79
Turnout		25,774	68.39	+2.26
Eligible voters		37,687		
Liberal hold		Swing		–8.23
Source: Elections Ontario

1990 Ontario general election
Party	Candidate	Votes	%	±%
Liberal	Elinor Caplan	10,655	41.86	–17.82
New Democratic	Lennox Farrell	8,441	33.16	+16.70
Progressive Conservative	Sam Billich	5,435	21.35	+0.51
Libertarian	Roland Brown	578	2.27	–0.76
Green	Greg Knittl	345	1.36	–
Total valid votes		25,454	98.32	
Total rejected, unmarked and declined ballots		436	1.68	+1.08
Turnout		25,890	66.13	+1.24
Eligible voters		39,152		
Liberal hold		Swing		–17.26
Source: Elections Ontario

1987 Ontario general election
Party	Candidate	Votes	%	±%
Liberal	Elinor Caplan	16,206	59.68	+10.62
Progressive Conservative	Fredelle Brief	5,659	20.84	–16.86
New Democratic	Judy Rebick	4,470	16.46	+6.28
Libertarian	George Graham	822	3.03	–0.05
Total valid votes		27,157	99.40	
Total rejected ballots		164	0.60	–0.02
Turnout		27,321	64.88	–0.20
Eligible voters		42,108		
Liberal hold		Swing		+13.74
Source: Elections Ontario

1985 Ontario general election
Party	Candidate	Votes	%	±%
Liberal	Elinor Caplan	17,641	49.05	+12.85
Progressive Conservative	John Reesor Williams	13,557	37.70	–11.99
New Democratic	Lorne Strachan	3,660	10.18	–3.93
Libertarian	George Graham	1,106	3.08	–
Total valid votes		35,964	99.38	
Total rejected ballots		226	0.62	+0.13
Turnout		36,190	65.08	+7.56
Eligible voters		55,605		
Liberal gain from Progressive Conservative		Swing		+12.42
Source: Elections Ontario

1981 Ontario general election
Party	Candidate	Votes	%	±%
Progressive Conservative	John Reesor Williams	15,644	49.68	+5.37
Liberal	David Pretty	11,400	36.21	+5.90
New Democratic	Lynn McDonald	4,443	14.11	–6.92
Total valid votes		31,487	99.50	
Total rejected ballots		157	0.50	+0.01
Turnout		31,644	57.52	–6.78
Eligible voters		55,012		
Progressive Conservative hold		Swing		–0.27
Source: Elections Ontario

1977 Ontario general election
Party	Candidate	Votes	%	±%
Progressive Conservative	John Reesor Williams	14,194	44.32	+5.61
Liberal	Luella Lumley	9,707	30.31	–7.65
New Democratic	Fred Birket	6,737	21.03	–2.30
Independent	Jim McMillan	929	2.90	–
Libertarian	Paul M. Miniato	282	0.88	–
Independent	Arthur V. Wright	180	0.56	–
Total valid votes		32,029	99.52	
Total rejected ballots		156	0.48	–0.08
Turnout		32,185	64.30	–3.58
Eligible voters		50,052		
Progressive Conservative hold		Swing		+6.63
Source: Elections Ontario

1975 Ontario general election
Party	Candidate	Votes	%
Progressive Conservative	John Reesor Williams	12,297	38.71
Liberal	Bob Reid	12,058	37.96
New Democratic	Ken Crooke	7,413	23.33
Total valid votes		31,768	99.44
Total rejected ballots		179	0.56
Turnout		31,947	67.88
Eligible voters		47,063	
Progressive Conservative pickup new district.			
Source: Elections Ontario

== See also ==
- List of Ontario provincial electoral districts
- Canadian provincial electoral districts
