= Don Valley East (provincial electoral district) =

Provincial electoral district in Ontario, Canada

Coordinates: 43.74°N 79.33°W

Ontario electoral district
- Location in Toronto

Provincial electoral district
- Legislature: Legislative Assembly of Ontario
MPP
Adil Shamji
Liberal
- District created: 1999
- First contested: 1999
- Last contested: 2025

Demographics
- Population (2016): 94,575
- Electors (2018): 66,192
- Area (km²): 23
- Pop. density (per km²): 4,112
- Census division: Toronto
- Census subdivision: Toronto

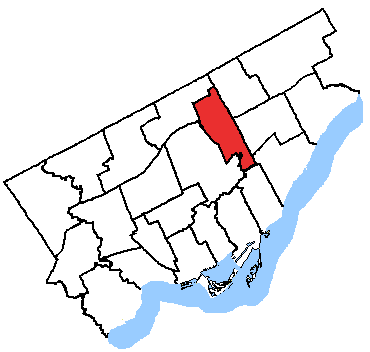
Don Valley East from 2003 to 2018

Don Valley East is a provincial electoral district in Toronto, Ontario, Canada. It elects one member to the Legislative Assembly of Ontario.

It was created in 1999 from parts of Don Mills, York Mills, Oriole and Willowdale.

When the riding was created, it included all of North York within the following line: A hydroelectric transmission corridor located south of McNicoll Avenue to Highway 404 to Finch Avenue to the Don River East Branch to Highway 401 to Leslie Street to the CN Railway to Don Mills Road to the CP Railway to the Don River East Branch to the border of East York around Sunrise Avenue.

In 2007, the boundaries were altered slightly. In the northwest, the boundary was changed from the Don River to Leslie Street, and in the south they changed from the North York/East York border to Sunrise Avenue.

This riding underwent significant changes during the 2012 electoral redistribution. It lost almost half of its territory to Don Valley North and gained a significant portion of Don Valley West.

== Members of Provincial Parliament ==
Don Valley East
Assembly	Years	Member	Party
Riding created from Don Mills, York Mills, Oriole and Willowdale
37th	1999–2003	David Caplan	Liberal
38th	2003–2007	David Caplan	Liberal
39th	2007–2011	David Caplan	Liberal
40th	2011–2014	Michael Coteau	Liberal
41st	2014–2018	Michael Coteau	Liberal
42nd	2018–2021	Michael Coteau	Liberal
42nd	2021–2022	Vacant	
43rd	2022–2025	Adil Shamji	Liberal
44th	2025–present	Adil Shamji	Liberal
Sourced from the Ontario Legislative Assembly

== Election results ==
Winning party in each polling division of Don Valley East at the 2025 Ontario general election

2025 Ontario general election
Party	Candidate	Votes	%	±%
Liberal	Adil Shamji	15,465	56.65	+12.79
Progressive Conservative	Roger Gingerich	8,784	32.17	–0.02
New Democratic	Frank Chu	2,094	7.67	–7.84
Green	Joshua Miersch	778	2.85	–1.21
Moderate	Krasimir Penkov	180	0.66	+0.36
Total valid votes		27,301	99.05	
Total rejected, unmarked and declined ballots		263	0.95	+0.08
Turnout		27,564	40.08	–2.29
Eligible voters		68,774		
Liberal hold		Swing		+6.40
Source: Elections Ontario

Winning party in each polling division of Don Valley East at the 2022 Ontario general election

2022 Ontario general election
Party	Candidate	Votes	%	±%	Expenditures
Liberal	Adil Shamji	12,313	43.86	+7.93	$62,597
Progressive Conservative	Sam Moini	9,038	32.19	–0.90	$68,119
New Democratic	Mara-Elena Nagy	4,355	15.51	–11.93	$62,411
Green	Rizwan Khan	1,139	4.06	+1.52	$2,544
New Blue	Denyse Twagiramariya	323	1.15	–	$0
Ontario Party	Donald McMullen	295	1.05	–	$0
Independent	Stella Kargiannakis	192	0.68	–	$0
Consensus Ontario	Dimitre Popov	180	0.64	–	$2,049
Freedom	Wayne Simmons	156	0.56	+0.19	$0
Moderate	Svetlozar Aleksiev	85	0.30	–	$0
Total valid votes/expense limit		28,076	99.13	–	$93,577
Total rejected, unmarked and declined ballots		247	0.87	–0.05	
Turnout		28,323	42.37	–12.85	
Eligible voters		66,841			
Liberal hold		Swing		+4.41	
Source: Elections Ontario

2018 Ontario general election
Party	Candidate	Votes	%	±%
Liberal	Michael Coteau	13,012	35.93	–22.80
Progressive Conservative	Denzil Minnan-Wong	11,984	33.09	+8.75
New Democratic	Khalid Ahmed	9,937	27.44	+15.48
Green	Mark Wong	917	2.53	–0.83
Libertarian	Justin Robinson	236	0.65	–
Freedom	Wayne Simmons	131	0.36	–0.47
Total valid votes		36,217	99.08	
Total rejected, unmarked and declined ballots		337	0.92	–0.27
Turnout		36,554	55.22	+7.38
Eligible voters		66,192		
Liberal hold		Swing		–15.78
Source: Elections Ontario

2014 general election redistributed results
Party	Vote	%
Liberal	18,508	58.73
Progressive Conservative	7,670	24.34
New Democratic	3,768	11.96
Green	1,060	3.36
Others	507	1.61

2014 Ontario general election
Party	Candidate	Votes	%	±%
Liberal	Michael Coteau	19,248	55.71	+4.64
Progressive Conservative	Angela Kennedy	9,257	26.79	–0.40
New Democratic	Akil Sadikali	4,500	13.03	–5.57
Green	Christopher McLeod	1,256	3.64	+1.44
Freedom	Wayne Simmons	287	0.83	+0.48
Total valid votes		34,548	98.81	
Total rejected, unmarked and declined ballots		415	1.19	+0.64
Turnout		34,963	47.85	+1.77
Eligible voters		73,070		
Liberal hold		Swing		+2.52
Source: Elections Ontario

2011 Ontario general election
Party	Candidate	Votes	%	±%
Liberal	Michael Coteau	16,350	51.08	–4.55
Progressive Conservative	Michael Lende	8,705	27.19	+2.08
New Democratic	Bob Hilliard	5,953	18.60	+7.97
Green	Aren Bedrosyan	702	2.19	–4.28
Family Coalition	Ryan Kidd	187	0.58	+0.02
Freedom	Wayne Simmons	113	0.35	+0.07
Total valid votes		32,010	99.46	
Total rejected, unmarked and declined ballots		175	0.54	–0.50
Turnout		32,185	46.08	–5.22
Eligible voters		69,851		
Liberal hold		Swing		–3.32
Source: Elections Ontario

2007 Ontario general election
Party	Candidate	Votes	%	±%
Liberal	David Caplan	19,667	55.63	–0.52
Progressive Conservative	Angela Kennedy	8,878	25.11	–6.82
New Democratic	Mary Trapani Hynes	3,759	10.63	+2.39
Green	Trifon Haitas	2,287	6.47	–
Independent	Stella Kargiannakis	467	1.32	–
Family Coalition	Ryan Kidd	198	0.56	–0.67
Freedom	Wayne Simmons	99	0.28	–0.04
Total valid votes		35,355	98.95	
Total rejected, unmarked and declined ballots		374	1.05	+0.24
Turnout		35,729	51.30	–4.02
Eligible voters		69,646		
Liberal hold		Swing		+3.15
Source: Elections Ontario

2003 general election redistributed results
Party	Vote	%
Liberal	17,951	56.14
Progressive Conservative	10,209	31.93
New Democratic	2,634	8.24
Others	1,179	3.69

2003 Ontario general election
Party	Candidate	Votes	%	±%
Liberal	David Caplan	21,327	56.80	+6.30
Progressive Conservative	Paul Sutherland	12,027	32.03	–11.16
New Democratic	Murphy Browne	3,058	8.14	+3.76
Green	Dan Craig	558	1.49	+1.28
Family Coalition	Ryan Kidd	460	1.23	+0.86
Freedom	Wayne Simmons	119	0.32	+0.19
Total valid votes		37,549	99.19	
Total rejected, unmarked and declined ballots		306	0.81	–0.46
Turnout		37,855	55.32	–6.25
Eligible voters		68,429		
Liberal hold		Swing		+8.73
Source: Elections Ontario

1999 Ontario general election
Party	Candidate	Votes	%
Liberal	David Caplan	20,993	50.50
Progressive Conservative	David Johnson	17,955	43.19
New Democratic	Janaki Bala-Krishnan	1,822	4.38
Independent	Raffi Assadourian	329	0.79
Family Coalition	Ryan Kidd	153	0.37
Communist	Elizabeth Rowley	91	0.22
Green	Jeff Pancer	85	0.20
Independent	Fernand Deschamps	65	0.16
Freedom	Wayne Simmons	53	0.13
Natural Law	Shail Lall	28	0.07
Total valid votes		41,574	98.74
Total rejected, unmarked and declined ballots		532	1.26
Turnout		42,106	61.57
Eligible voters		68,391	
Liberal pickup new district.			
Source: Elections Ontario

== 2007 electoral reform referendum ==
2007 Ontario electoral reform referendum
Side	Votes	%
First Past the Post	20,758	61.01
Mixed member proportional	13,265	38.99
Total valid votes	34,023	95.23
Total rejected, unmarked and declined ballots	1,706	4.77
Turnout	35,729	51.30
Eligible voters	69,646	

== See also ==
- List of Ontario provincial electoral districts
- Canadian provincial electoral districts
