= John Reesor Williams =

Canadian politician

The Honourable John Reesor Williams ECO

Ontario MPP
- In office 1975–1985
- Preceded by: New riding
- Succeeded by: Elinor Caplan
- Constituency: Oriole

Personal details
- Born: September 9, 1930 (age 96) Toronto, Ontario, Canada
- Party: Conservative
- Spouse: Lorraine Mary O'Donnell
- Children: 5, including Harland and Steve
- Profession: Lawyer

John Reesor Williams (born September 9, 1930) is a former politician in Ontario, Canada. He served as a Progressive Conservative member in the Legislative Assembly of Ontario from 1975 to 1985, and was briefly a cabinet minister in the government of Frank Miller.

== Background ==
Williams was born in Toronto, the son of Luella Mae Maud (née Reesor) and Thomas John Williams. He was educated at the University of Western Ontario and Osgoode Hall Law School. He worked as a lawyer before entering political life. Comedian Harland Williams is one of his five children.

His mother was the daughter of George Reesor, a descendant of one of the German families that originally settled Markham, Ontario, in 1794.

== Municipal politics ==
Williams was an alderman in North York, Ontario, from 1963 to 1972, and was deputy mayor and Controller of the borough from 1973 to 1974. He also served on the Metro Toronto Council during this period, and was a board member of St. Matthew the Apostle Anglican Church in 1971. From 1973 to 1975, he served on the board of governors for Seneca College.

== Provincial politics ==
He was elected to the Ontario legislature in the 1975 provincial election, defeating Liberal candidate Bob Reid by 239 votes in the North York district of Oriole. He was re-elected with an increased majority in the 1977 and 1981 elections, and served as a backbench supporter of the Bill Davis government.

Williams supported Frank Miller to succeed Davis as Premier of Ontario in January 1985, and was appointed as Solicitor-General when Miller became premier on February 8, 1985. His appointment was controversial in some circles. Williams was strongly anti-abortion, and had previously opposed granting any police protection to Henry Morgentaler's abortion clinic in Toronto.

Miller's government lost several seats in the 1985 election, and was subsequently defeated in the legislature. Williams was personally defeated in Oriole by Liberal candidate Elinor Caplan.

In 2005, veteran legislators Sean Conway and Bob Runciman both named Williams as the most boring speaker they had encountered in the course of their careers. His speaking style is demonstrated in the following quote: "the type of rhetoric from the opposition continues without any factual backups to substantiate those generalizations that have become nothing more than rhetoric and well-worn clichés".

Davis ministry, Province of Ontario (1971–1985)
Cabinet post (1)
Predecessor	Office	Successor
George Taylor	Solicitor General; 1985 (February–May)	Bud Gregory
