= Stan Randall =

Canadian politician (1908–1989)

Stanley John Randall

MPP for Don Mills
- In office 1963–1971
- Preceded by: Riding established
- Succeeded by: Dennis Timbrell

Personal details
- Born: February 1, 1908 Toronto, Ontario
- Died: December 13, 1989 (aged 81)
- Party: Progressive Conservative
- Spouse: Agnes
- Children: 2
- Occupation: Businessman

Stanley John Randall (February 1, 1908 – December 13, 1989) was a Canadian businessman and political figure from Ontario. He represented Don Mills in the Legislative Assembly of Ontario as a Progressive Conservative member.

He was born in Toronto, the son of Annie Letitia and Stephen Randall, educated in Toronto. In 1932, he married Agnes Parker. They had two daughters, Joan and Patricia. Randall began work as a clerk later becoming president of the Easy Washing Machine Company. He was vice-president of the Canadian Manufacturer's Association and chairman of the Ontario Economic Council from 1962 to 1963. He served in the provincial cabinet as Minister of Economics and Development from 1963 to 1968 and Minister of Trade and Development from 1968 to 1971. He retired from politics in 1971.
