= Don Mills (electoral district) =

Former provincial electoral district in Ontario, Canada

Ontario electoral district

Defunct provincial electoral district
- Legislature: Legislative Assembly of Ontario
- District created: 1963
- District abolished: 1996
- First contested: 1963
- Last contested: 1999

Demographics
- Census division: Metro Toronto
- Census subdivision(s): East York, North York; Toronto (1998–1999)

Don Mills was a provincial electoral district in Ontario, Canada. It was created for the 1963 provincial election, and lasted until the provincial redistribution in 1996. The riding was formally retired with the 1999 provincial election. At its abolition, the riding consisted of the neighbourhoods of Woodbine Gardens and Parkview Hill in the borough of East York plus the neighbourhoods of Flemingdon Park and the southern part of Don Mills in North York (all of North York south of Lawrence Avenue). It was abolished into Don Valley East, Don Valley West and Beaches—East York.

The riding was a bastion of strength for the Progressive Conservative Party of Ontario for most of its history, and was represented by moderate Tory cabinet ministers Dennis Timbrell and David Johnson at different times. The Liberal Party and the New Democratic Party both represented the riding between 1987 and 1993.

== Boundaries ==
The riding was created in 1963, one of several new ridings in Metro. The initial boundaries were the North York city limits on the south and east and west and Lawrence Avenue East formed the northern boundary.

== Members of Provincial Parliament ==
Don Mills
Assembly	Years	Member	Party
Created from part of York East riding in 1963
27th	1963–1967	Stanley Randall	Progressive Conservative
28th	1967–1971	Stanley Randall	Progressive Conservative
29th	1971–1975	Dennis Timbrell	Progressive Conservative
30th	1975–1977	Dennis Timbrell	Progressive Conservative
31st	1977–1981	Dennis Timbrell	Progressive Conservative
32nd	1981–1985	Dennis Timbrell	Progressive Conservative
33rd	1985–1987	Dennis Timbrell	Progressive Conservative
34th	1987–1990	Murad Velshi	Liberal
35th	1990–1993	Margery Ward (Note: Ward died in office (cancer), January 22, 1993.)	New Democratic
35th	1993–1995	David Johnson	Progressive Conservative
36th	1995–1999	David Johnson	Progressive Conservative
Sourced from the Ontario Legislative Assembly
Merged into Don Valley East, Don Valley West and Beaches—East York after 1999

== Election results ==
1995 Ontario general election
Party	Candidate	Votes	%	±%
Progressive Conservative	David Johnson	14,897	53.36	+1.49
Liberal	Richard Gosling	7,607	27.25	–4.42
New Democratic	Janaki Bala-Krishnan	4,569	16.37	+7.78
Freedom	David Pengelly	253	0.91	–0.01
Independent	Mario M. Ribeiro	243	0.87	–
Natural Law	Laurence Corp	231	0.83	–
Independent	Lee Wildgen	119	0.43	–
Total valid votes		27,919	98.80	
Total rejected, unmarked and declined ballots		339	1.20	–0.20
Turnout		28,258	66.09	+23.21
Eligible voters		42,758		
Progressive Conservative hold		Swing		+2.96
Source: Elections Ontario

Ontario provincial by-election, April 1, 1993 Death of Margery Ward
Party	Candidate	Votes	%	±%
Progressive Conservative	David Johnson	9,143	51.87	+25.07
Liberal	Murad Velshi	5,583	31.67	+0.82
New Democratic	Chandran Mylvaganam	1,513	8.58	–25.61
Independent	Diane Johnston	498	2.83	–
Family Coalition	Denise Mountenay	383	2.17	–
Independent	Bernadette Michael	206	1.17	–
Freedom	David Pengelly	161	0.91	–0.54
Green	Sat Khalsa	141	0.80	–1.33
Total valid votes		17,628	98.60	
Total rejected, unmarked and declined ballots		250	1.40	–0.06
Turnout		17,878	42.88	–21.36
Eligible voters		41,695		
Progressive Conservative gain from New Democratic		Swing		+25.34
Source: Elections Ontario

1990 Ontario general election
Party	Candidate	Votes	%	±%
New Democratic	Margery Ward	9,740	34.20	+10.61
Liberal	Murad Velshi	8,786	30.85	–9.85
Progressive Conservative	Nola Sam Crewe	7,631	26.79	–5.03
Libertarian	David Miller	742	2.61	–
Green	Katherine S. Mathewson	608	2.13	–
Independent	Colin McKay	562	1.97	–
Freedom	David Pengelly	414	1.45	–0.29
Total valid votes		28,483	98.54	
Total rejected, unmarked and declined ballots		421	1.46	+0.71
Turnout		28,904	64.23	+5.27
Eligible voters		44,998		
New Democratic gain from Liberal		Swing		+10.23
Source: Elections Ontario

1987 Ontario general election
Party	Candidate	Votes	%	±%
Liberal	Murad Velshi	11,083	40.70	+16.11
Progressive Conservative	David Lindsay	8,666	31.82	–18.90
New Democratic	Margery Ward	6,424	23.59	+3.43
Independent	David Smith	586	2.15	–
Freedom	David Pengelly	475	1.74	–
Total valid votes		27,234	99.25	
Total rejected ballots		205	0.75	+0.08
Turnout		27,439	58.97	+1.54
Eligible voters		46,534		
Liberal gain from Progressive Conservative		Swing		+17.51
Source: Elections Ontario

1985 Ontario general election
Party	Candidate	Votes	%	±%
Progressive Conservative	Dennis Timbrell	15,481	50.72	–13.27
Liberal	John R. Atkin	7,504	24.59	+4.98
New Democratic	Michael G. Wyatt	6,153	20.16	+3.77
Independent	Gary Watson	1,382	4.53	–
Total valid votes		30,520	99.34	
Total rejected ballots		204	0.66	+0.15
Turnout		30,724	57.42	+5.04
Eligible voters		53,506		
Progressive Conservative hold		Swing		–9.12
Source: Elections Ontario

1981 Ontario general election
Party	Candidate	Votes	%	±%
Progressive Conservative	Dennis Timbrell	17,516	63.99	+8.80
Liberal	Murad Velshi	5,368	19.61	+3.69
New Democratic	Michael T. Lee	4,487	16.39	–9.98
Total valid votes		27,371	99.48	
Total rejected ballots		142	0.52	+0.02
Turnout		27,513	52.38	–8.66
Eligible voters		52,524		
Progressive Conservative hold		Swing		+2.56
Source: Elections Ontario

1977 Ontario general election
Party	Candidate	Votes	%	±%
Progressive Conservative	Dennis Timbrell	17,005	55.20	+8.60
New Democratic	Steve Thomas	8,125	26.37	–0.48
Liberal	Andrew Meles	4,906	15.92	–10.62
Libertarian	Michael Martin	772	2.51	–
Total valid votes		30,808	99.51	
Total rejected ballots		153	0.49	+0.01
Turnout		30,961	61.05	+0.49
Eligible voters		50,717		
Progressive Conservative hold		Swing		+4.54
Source: Elections Ontario

1975 Ontario general election
Party	Candidate	Votes	%	±%
Progressive Conservative	Dennis Timbrell	14,007	46.59	–4.20
New Democratic	Robert (Bob) Sherwood	8,074	26.86	–5.05
Liberal	Donalda Wright	7,981	26.55	+9.26
Total valid votes		30,062	99.51	
Total rejected ballots		147	0.49	+0.16
Turnout		30,209	60.56	–13.62
Eligible voters		49,885		
Progressive Conservative hold		Swing		+0.43
Source: Elections Ontario

1971 Ontario general election
Party	Candidate	Votes	%	±%
Progressive Conservative	Dennis Timbrell	16,102	50.80	+9.35
New Democratic	James (Jim) Norton	10,116	31.91	–5.67
Liberal	Michael Kusner	5,481	17.29	–2.72
Total valid votes		31,699	99.68	
Total rejected ballots		103	0.32	–2.22
Turnout		31,802	74.18	+7.74
Eligible voters		42,873		
Progressive Conservative hold		Swing		+7.51
Source: Elections Ontario

1967 Ontario general election
Party	Candidate	Votes	%	±%
Progressive Conservative	Stan Randall	9,646	41.45	–10.18
New Democratic	Chris Smith	8,747	37.59	+9.65
Liberal	Gordon I. Ryan	4,656	20.01	–0.42
Social Credit	Rae Beacock	222	0.95	–
Total valid votes		23,271	97.46	
Total rejected ballots		607	2.54	+1.47
Turnout		23,878	66.43	+6.31
Eligible voters		35,943		
Progressive Conservative hold		Swing		–9.92
Source: Elections Ontario

1963 Ontario general election
Party	Candidate	Votes	%
Progressive Conservative	Stan Randall	9,708	51.64
New Democratic	Jim Renwick	5,252	27.93
Liberal	David Stewart	3,841	20.43
Total valid votes		18,801	98.93
Total rejected ballots		203	1.07
Turnout		19,004	60.12
Eligible voters		31,611	
Progressive Conservative pickup new district.			
Source: Elections Ontario

== See also ==
- List of Ontario provincial electoral districts
- Canadian provincial electoral districts
