= Dennis Timbrell =

Canadian politician (born 1946)

The Honourable Dennis Timbrell ECO

Ontario MPP
- In office 1971–1987
- Preceded by: Stanley Randall
- Succeeded by: Murad Velshi
- Constituency: Don Mills

Personal details
- Born: November 13, 1946 (age 79) Kingston, Ontario, Canada
- Party: Progressive Conservative
- Occupation: Teacher

Dennis Roy Timbrell (born November 13, 1946) is a politician in Ontario, Canada. He was a member of Provincial Parliament (MPP) from 1971 to 1987, and was a Cabinet minister in the Progressive Conservative governments of Bill Davis and Frank Miller.

== Background ==
Timbrell was born in Kingston, Ontario and educated at Woburn Collegiate Institute in Scarborough, Ontario and York University in Toronto. His brother Robert was an actor and performer, better known by the stage name Rusty Ryan.

Timbrell worked as a teacher before entering provincial politics, and served as an alderman in North York from January 1970 until September 1, 1972.

== Provincial politics ==
Timbrell contested 1971 provincial election as a candidate for the PCs, and won election in the Toronto constituency of Don Mills. He was re-elected without difficulty in the campaigns of 1975, 1977, 1981 and 1985.

=== Cabinet ===
He became a minister without portfolio responsible for youth in the Davis government on February 26, 1974, making him the youngest cabinet member in the province's history. He was then named as minister of energy on January 15, 1975. On February 3, 1977, he was promoted to minister of health, serving in this high-profile position for five years; no successor has since exceeded Timbrell's tenure in this ministry. He then requested a change in portfolio to minister of agriculture and food on February 13, 1982, with the aim of building a base of support in the rural areas of the province to strengthen future leadership credentials.

Davis ministry, Province of Ontario (1971–1985)
Cabinet posts (4)
Predecessor	Office	Successor
Lorne Henderson	Minister of Agriculture and Food; 1982–1985	Philip Andrewes
Frank Miller	Minister of Health; 1977–1982	Larry Grossman
Darcy McKeough	Minister of Energy; 1975–1977	James Taylor
Sub-Cabinet Post
Predecessor	Title	Successor
	Minister Without Portfolio (1974–1975); Responsible for Youth	

=== First leadership campaign ===
Following Davis's resignation as PC leader and as premier, Timbrell sought the party leadership at the January 1985 leadership convention. He positioned himself as a centre-right candidate, further to the right of Red Tory rivals Larry Grossman and Roy McMurtry, but not as far to the right as Frank Miller, and therefore the candidate best able to continue Davis' pragmatic, successful style of government. (In fact, many media pundits at the time referred to Timbrell as a "clone" of Davis; playing to this, some of Timbrell's supporters at the January 1985 convention wore buttons that depicted a caricature which morphed the facial features of both Davis and Timbrell into one person). Timbrell was the only candidate to favour eliminating rent controls during the campaign. His supporters included Keith Norton, Leo Bernier, Margaret Birch, Robert Eaton, Gordon Dean, Bob Welch and Norm Sterling. Davis was officially neutral in this contest, but has since admitted that he personally voted for Timbrell.

Timbrell placed second on the first ballot, but was eliminated when he fell to third place on the second ballot, six votes behind Grossman who had the backing of McMurtry's campaign. Dr. John Balkwill in 1987 claimed that 30 to 40 Miller supporters were instructed by the Miller campaign to vote for Grossman on the second ballot to prevent him from advancing. Lou Parsons, a senior Miller adviser, later acknowledged, "We wouldn't have won it against Dennis [...] Our winning strategy was always to be against Larry ... and in the end we were lucky." A member of Miller's campaign has since apologized to Timbrell for this tactic.

Timbrell reluctantly endorsed Grossman after the results were confirmed by a recount. He however did not bring enough delegates on the third ballot and that resulted in Miller's victory. He was retained in Miller's Cabinet as minister of municipal affairs and housing with responsibility for women's issues.

=== Second leadership campaign ===
The Progressive Conservative Party under Miller's leadership was reduced to a narrow minority government in the 1985 election. Following a cabinet shuffle on May 17, 1985, Timbrell retained his previous postings and was additionally appointed provincial secretary for resource development. Miller's government was defeated in the House in June, 1985. In opposition, Timbrell served as House leader of the Official Opposition and his party's critic for education and women's issues.

Miller resigned as leader, and the party called another leadership convention for November 1985. This contest was an extremely divisive struggle between Timbrell and Grossman, which exposed deep divisions in the party. A third candidate, Alan Pope, drew attention to the animosity between the candidates with his slogan, "Don't choose sides, choose Pope". Alan Eagleson was a co-chairman of Timbrell's campaign.

In this leadership race, Timbrell announced he would not support the full funding of Catholic schools (which had previously been agreed to by all parties in the legislature) unless amendments were put forward guaranteeing entry to non-Catholic teachers and students. Norm Sterling, an inveterate opponent of Catholic school funding, derided Timbrell's position as opportunistic and crossed over to Grossman.

Pope finished third on the opening ballot and some believed that he could have given Timbrell a second-ballot victory over Grossman, though Pope chose not to endorse either side. Grossman defeated Timbrell on the second ballot by nineteen votes, effectively ending Timbrell's career in provincial politics. He did not seek re-election in 1987, as his two unsuccessful leadership bids had left him with a debt of $250,000.

Despite no longer being an MPP, Timbrell was seen by many as the front runner to succeed Grossman in the 1990 Ontario PC Leadership Race, but he chose not to run, instead supporting the candidacy of Dianne Cunningham, who would eventually lose to Mike Harris.

Miller ministry, Province of Ontario (1985)
Cabinet posts (2)
Predecessor	Office	Successor
Ernie Eves	Provincial Secretary for Resource Development; 1985 (May–June)	Position abolished
Claude Bennett	Minister of Municipal Affairs and Housing; 1985 (February–June)	Bernard Grandmaître (Municipal Affairs); Alvin Curling (Housing)

== Private sector career ==
Timbrell served as president of the Ontario Hospital Association from 1991 to 1995. He also served as a director of the St. Joseph's Health System (Sisters of St. Joseph, Morrow Park) from 1986 to 1988 and a director of the Toronto School of Theology from 1986 to 1992 and in 1997–2003 (vice-chairman from 1991 to 1993 and in 1997–2000, chairman from 2000 to 2003). He has served as a director of various corporations, including Cabot Trust, Confederation Leasing, Confederation Trust, Ontario Blue Cross, United Telemanagement (Canada) Corporation and Eco Power Solutions Inc.

From 2001 to 2005 Timbrell was engaged by the Ontario Ministry of Health to act as Supervisor of The Ottawa Hospital and then Investigator of The Niagara Health System and Hotel Dieu Hospital (St. Catharines) as well as Investigator of the Grand River and St. Mary's Hospitals in Waterloo Region. His work with the leadership of these hospitals resulted in renewed/revised mandates which emphasized the unique attributes of each institution while ensuring minimal overlap and with co-ordination of their respective areas of expertise. In Ottawa Timbrell oversaw the recruitment of a complete new Board of Governors, drawn from the vast region served by TOH; having dismissed the incumbent CEO of the Hospital, he appointed a new President from the ranks of the Senior Team and created the position of Vice-President and Chief Operating Officer.

All of the Hospitals for which Timbrell was Supervisor or Investigator have gone from strength to strength in the last twenty years. He was originally appointed by a PC Government and successfully continued his roles with a Liberal Government. In his earlier role as President of the OHA, he established a very productive relationship with NDP Health Minister (now Senator) Frances Lankin which contributed to significant improvements in Ministry programs and policies directly affecting all hospitals in Ontario.

== Federal politics ==
In 1997 and again in 2000 Timbrell campaigned for a seat in the House of Commons as the federal Progressive Conservative candidate in the eastern Ontario riding of Prince Edward—Hastings In the 1997 federal election, Timbrell placed second to Liberal Lyle Vanclief, with 21.5% of the vote. In the 2000 election, Timbrell placed third with 20.3% of the vote.

== Recognition ==
In 2006, Toronto City Council voted to name the community recreation centre, aquatic centre, library and child care facility, located at 29 St. Dennis Drive, Don Mills the "Dennis R. Timbrell Resource Centre in Flemingdon Park".

Timbrell has received the following forms of recognition:

1977 - Queen's Silver Jubilee Medal

1978 - Officer of The Order of St. John of Jerusalem

1992 - Canada Confederation 125 Medal

1993 - Knight of Malta

2012 - Queen's Diamond Jubilee Medal
