= Margery Ward =

Canadian politician

Ontario MPP
- In office 1990–1993
- Preceded by: Murad Velshi
- Succeeded by: David Johnson
- Constituency: Don Mills

Personal details
- Born: July 18, 1942 Bass River, New Brunswick, Canada
- Died: January 22, 1993 (aged 50) Toronto, Ontario, Canada
- Party: New Democrat
- Occupation: Computer systems designer

Margery Ward (July 18, 1942 – January 22, 1993) was a politician in Ontario, Canada. She served as a New Democratic Party member of the Legislative Assembly of Ontario from 1990 until her death in 1993.

== Background ==
Ward grew up in Bass River, New Brunswick. She came from a family of eight children, six girls and two boys. She left there as a teenager after dropping out of high school and moved to Toronto. She worked as a grocery store clerk for twenty years. During this time she completed her high school diploma at night school. She attended York University, where she obtained a Bachelor of Arts degree in computer science. She went to work at Manufacturer's Life Insurance Company as a data processing manager and as a computer systems designer. She was active in the Retail, Wholesale and Department Store Union, eventually becoming secretary of the Toronto local.

== Politics ==
Ward ran in the 1987 provincial election in the riding of Don Mills. She placed third behind winner Liberal Murad Velshi tallying 6,3681 votes, about 24% of the votes cast. She tried again in the 1990 provincial election and this time was elected over Velshi by 746 votes. Ward attributed her win to her opposition to the rent control system as 60% of the voters in the riding were tenants. She said, "The current legislation provides no protection whatsoever for the tenants."

She was appointed parliamentary assistant to the Minister of Government Services on October 1, 1990, and held this position until her death from cancer in early 1993.

York University now offers a Margery Ward Memorial Bursary in political science.

== Electoral results ==
1987 Ontario general election: Don Mills
| Party | Candidate | Votes | % | ±% |
|---|---|---|---|---|
| Liberal | Murad Velshi | 11,083 | 40.70 | +16.11 |
| Progressive Conservative | David Lindsay | 8,666 | 31.82 | -18.90 |
| New Democratic | Margery Ward | 6,424 | 23.59 | +3.43 |
| Independent | David Smith | 586 | 2.15 | |
| Freedom | David Pengally | 475 | 1.74 | |
| Total valid votes | | 27,234 | 98.96 | |
| Total declined, rejected and unmarked ballots | | 285 | 1.04 | +0.19 |
| Turnout | | 27,519 | 59.14 | +1.61 |
| Eligible voters | | 46,534 | | |
| Liberal gain from Progressive Conservative | | Swing | | +17.51 |

1990 Ontario general election: Don Mills
| Party | Candidate | Votes | % | ±% |
|---|---|---|---|---|
| New Democratic | Margery Ward | 9,740 | 34.20 | +10.61 |
| Liberal | Murad Velshi | 8,786 | 30.85 | -9.85 |
| Progressive Conservative | Nola Crewe | 7,631 | 26.79 | -5.03 |
| Libertarian | David Miller | 742 | 2.61 | |
| Green | Katherine Mathewson | 608 | 2.13 | |
| Independent | Colin McKay | 562 | 1.97 | |
| Freedom | David Pengally | 414 | 1.45 | -0.29 |
| Total valid votes | | 28,483 | 98.54 | |
| Total declined, rejected and unmarked ballots | | 421 | 1.46 | +0.42 |
| Turnout | | 28,904 | 64.23 | +5.10 |
| Eligible voters | | 44,998 | | |
| New Democratic gain from Liberal | | Swing | | +10.23 |
