= Caplansky's Delicatessen =

Delicatessen in Toronto, Ontario, Canada

Restaurant information
- Established: 2009
- Closed: November 15, 2026
- Food type: Kosher style Jewish delicatessen
- Dress code: Casual
- Location: 6301 Silver Dart Drive (Terminal 3, Toronto Pearson International Airport), Mississauga, Ontario, L5P 1B2, Canada
- Website: www.caplanskys.com

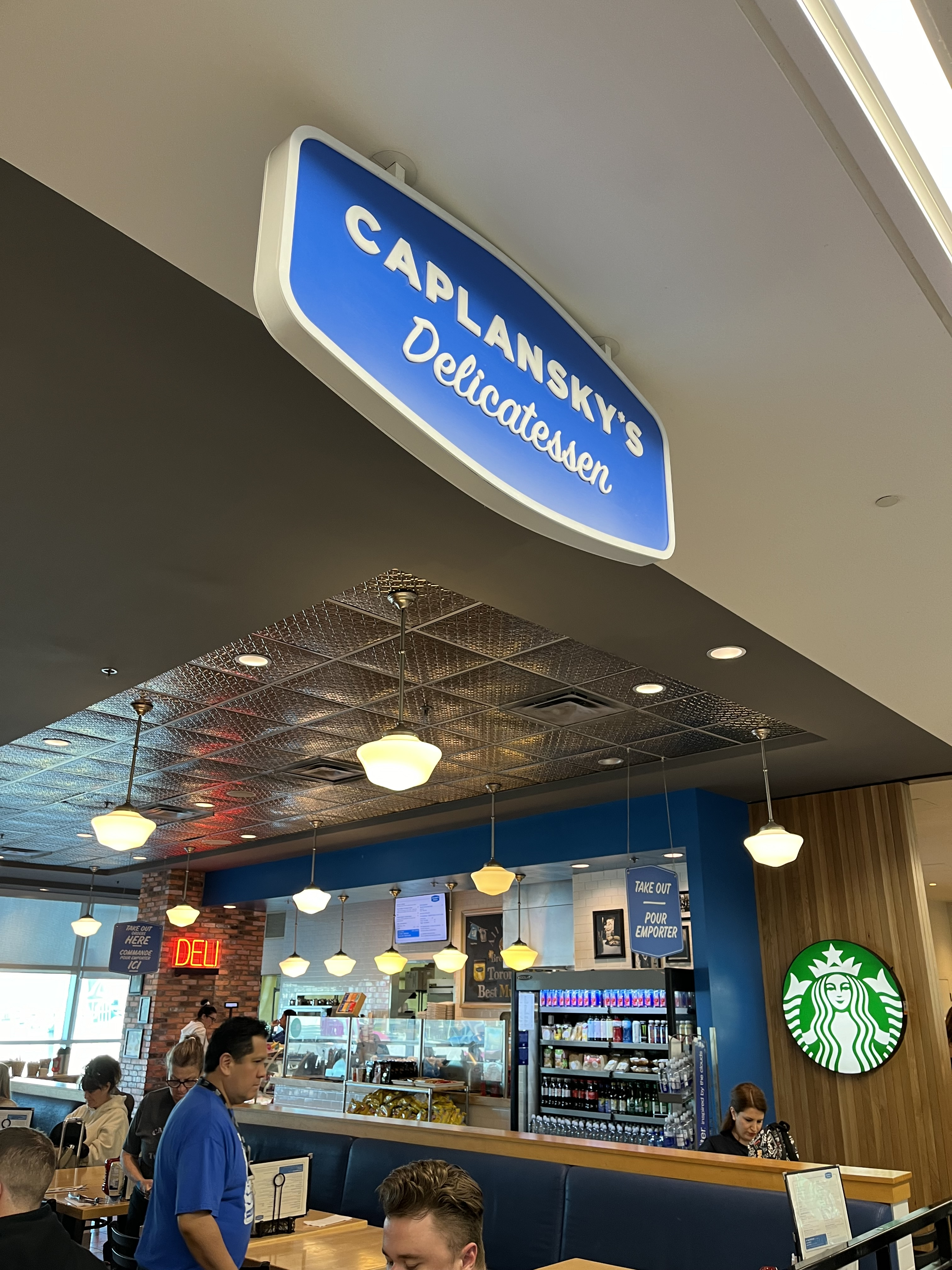
Caplansky's Delicatessen at Toronto Pearson International Airport

Caplansky's Delicatessen was a kosher-style Jewish delicatessen business based in Toronto, Ontario, Canada. It originated in 2007 in a room at the Monarch Tavern on Clinton Street, which Zane Caplansky rented to prepare and sell house-cured, hand-cut smoked meat sandwiches and knishes. In 2009, Caplansky opened a full-service delicatessen at 356 College Street near Kensington Market. The business subsequently expanded to other locations, including Toronto Pearson International Airport, and operated a food truck. Its College Street and Yorkville locations closed in 2018, while its final restaurant, at Toronto Pearson, closed on November 15, 2026. The company continues to produce a line of mustards.

== History ==
It originated in 2007 in a room in the Monarch Tavern on Clinton Street which Zane Caplansky rented as a venue to make and sell house-cured hand-cut smoked meat sandwiches and knishes. The venture was successful and in 2009, Caplansky opened his eponymous full service delicatessen located at 356 College Street near Kensington Market. Caplansky's opened a food truck, named "Thunderin' Thelma", in 2011, which travelled to various events and locations in the city to sell food on the street.

In 2013, Caplansky's launched a line of mustards in grocery stores and specialty shops across Ontario, Quebec, and Nova Scotia.

Caplansky's received worldwide publicity the next year when it sponsored the Toronto Palestine Film Festival.

In August 2014, Caplansky's opened a franchise at Pearson International Airport. Another location opened in Toronto's Yorkville area.

In 2016, Caplansky's sued its College Street landlord after the landlord padlocked the premises after declaring the Caplansky's lease to be terminated due to a dispute over repairs. A month later, the Ontario Superior Court validated the lease and returned "exclusive possession" of the premises to Caplansky's, ordering the landlord to allow Caplansky's to resume operations.

On January 3, 2018, Zane Caplansky announced the closure of the College St. location stating that business had never recovered from the 2016 interruption of business. Caplansky's also faced mounting legal costs due to continuing disputes with the landlord. Caplansky's Yorkville location closed suddenly on January 31, 2018, after, frustrated by only breaking even, Caplansky's partner in the Yorkville location bought out the lease and terminated it.

The airport location was operated by HMSHost under a licensing agreement for the Caplansky's name. The food truck ceased operations and was sold.

In 2019, Caplansky's launched a food stand at the Rogers Centre and re-launched a line of mustards, selling them online.

In November 2026, Caplansky announced that the company's last remaining restaurant, located in Terminal 3 of Toronto Pearson International Airport, would close permanently on November 15, after 12 years of operation. Caplansky told blogTO that neither he nor the franchise operator had made the decision to close and that he had received no explanation for it. He said he had contacted the Greater Toronto Airports Authority seeking clarification but had not received a response. He also praised the restaurant's employees, noting that many of those who had worked there since its opening remained on staff. Following the closure, the company continued producing its line of small-batch mustards.

== See also ==
- List of Ashkenazi Jewish restaurants
- List of delicatessens
