= Murad Velshi =

Canadian politician

- 𑈤𑈯𑈦𑈬𑈛 𑈨𑈰𑈧𑈵𑈩𑈶𑈮

Ontario MPP
- In office 1987–1990
- Preceded by: Dennis Timbrell
- Succeeded by: Margery Ward
- Constituency: Don Mills

Personal details
- Born: April 4, 1935 (age 91) Pretoria, South Africa
- Party: Liberal
- Spouse: Mila
- Children: Ali Velshi
- Occupation: Businessman

Murad Velshi (born April 4, 1935) is a former politician in Ontario, Canada. He was a Liberal member of the Legislative Assembly of Ontario from 1987 to 1990. He represented the riding of Don Mills in Toronto.

== Politics ==
He ran for a seat in the Ontario legislature in the 1981 provincial election and finished a distant second in the riding of Don Mills against Progressive Conservative incumbent Dennis Timbrell. When Timbrell retired before the 1987 election, he ran again this time defeating his closest opponent by more than 2,000 votes. He served for a year as Parliamentary assistant to the Minister of Citizenship and Immigration.

The Liberals were defeated in the Ontario general election in 1990 and Velshi lost his seat to Margery Ward of the New Democratic Party of Ontario by 1,004 votes. He attempted to regain the seat in a by-election held on April 1, 1993, but finished a weak second against Progressive Conservative candidate David Johnson.

== Personal life ==
Murad Velshi is an Ismaili Muslim of Gujarati Indian descent. His son is the television journalist Ali Velshi.
