= Paul Sutherland (politician) =

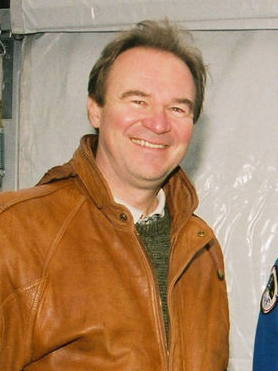
- Sutherland in 2002

Toronto City Councillor for (Ward 33) Don Valley East
- In office 2000–2003
- Preceded by: New ward
- Succeeded by: Shelley Carroll

North York City Councillor for Ward 14
- In office 1985–1997
- Preceded by: Betty Sutherland
- Succeeded by: Position abolished

Personal details
- Born: 1955 (age 70–71) Toronto, Ontario
- Children: 1
- Occupation: Lobbyist

Paul Sutherland (born c. 1955) is a former politician in Toronto, Ontario. He was a City Councillor from 2000 to 2003, former North York City Councillor, a former candidate for the Ontario Progressive Conservative Party in the provincial riding of Don Valley East in 2003, and a member of the Economic Committee of the Toronto Board of Trade from 2004 to 2005.

His parents, Bill Sutherland and Betty Sutherland, were both members of North York City Council. He was born in Toronto and holds a BA in political science from Trent University. He married Rhea Reynolds in 1983 and they have a daughter.

He retired from municipal politics in 2003 and currently owns and operates his own consulting firm as a Lobbyist.
