= Judy Marsales =

Canadian politician

Ontario MPP
- In office 2003–2007
- Preceded by: David Christopherson
- Succeeded by: Riding dissolved
- Constituency: Hamilton West

Personal details
- Born: Winnipeg, Manitoba
- Party: Liberal
- Occupation: Real estate agent

Judy Marsales is a former politician in Ontario, Canada. She was a Liberal member of the Legislative Assembly of Ontario from 2003 to 2007.

== Background ==
Marsales was born and raised in Winnipeg, moving to Hamilton, Ontario in 1972. She began working in real estate in 1980, first as an agent, and then beginning her own business, Judy Marsales Real Estate Ltd., in January 1988. In 1991, she became the first woman president of the Metropolitan Hamilton Real Estate Board. In 1996, president of the Hamilton and District Chamber of Commerce. She was appointed to the Hamilton Port Authority in 2001.

== Politics ==
In the 2003 provincial election, Marsales won the riding. The seat was formerly held by NDP David Christopherson who had stepped down to enter the City of Hamilton mayoral race. During the campaign, she faced New Democrat Roy Adams and Progressive Conservative, Doug Brown. She won by just over 2,000 votes.

As a rookie MPP, Marsales proposed an anti-spam measure as private member's bill in May, 2004, the province's first, and was made a member of the legislature's economic affairs and finance committee. She was passed over in the cabinet reshuffle of July 2005, but in March 2006 was made parliamentary assistant to the Minister of Economic Development and Trade. That appointment lasted less than a month. She was then appointed as parliamentary assistant to the Minister of Small Business and Entrepreneurship.

Marsales had been expected to seek re-election in the reapportioned riding of Hamilton Centre against NDP incumbent Andrea Horwath. However, a story ran in the Toronto Star on July 12, 2007, indicating Marsales had instead decided to retire from provincial politics. She is currently the broker of record at Judy Marsales Real Estate in Hamilton, Ontario.
