= Ontario Liberal Party candidates in the 1995 Ontario provincial election =

The Liberal Party of Ontario ran a full slate of candidates in the 1995 provincial election, and won thirty seats to form the Official Opposition in the Legislative Assembly of Ontario. Many of the party's candidates have their own biography pages; information about others may be found here.

== Filomena Tassi (Hamilton Centre) ==
Tassi is a lawyer in Hamilton, Ontario with strong family connections to the Liberal Party. Her mother managed the constituency office of federal cabinet minister John Munro, and Tassi herself worked as a computer operator for Munro in 1984 (Toronto Star, 30 January 1991 and Hamilton Spectator, 18 May 1994).

Tassi is past president of the St. Thomas More Lawyers Guild Campaign (Spectator, 17 May 1995). In the early 1990s, she set up a company called Be Your Own Lawyer, Inc., offering legal instructions for those who regard the profession as inaccessible or too expensive. The company's first product was an instructional kit on writing a will, made available for $19.95 (Hamilton Spectator, 3 July 1993).

She campaigned for a seat on Hamilton's separate school board in 1991 at age 29, and was elected to the first position in Ward Three. Incumbent candidate Tony Agro was relegated to the second position (Hamilton Spectator, 4 November 1991). She did not seek re-election in 1994, and instead campaigned for the provincial Liberal nomination in Hamilton Centre. Ironically, she defeated Tony Agro to win the nomination in May 1994 (Spectator, 28 May 1994).

The nomination battle was divisive, and may have contributed to Tassi's narrow loss in the general election. She received 7,322 votes (33.64%), finishing a close second against New Democratic Party incumbent David Christopherson.

Tassi is now chaplain at St. Mary's Catholic High School in Hamilton, and works as pilgrimage committee chair with the Hamilton-Wentworth Catholic District School Board. She has supported cultural exchange programs with the Dominican Republic, as well as relief work in Haiti and Uganda (Spectator, 13 February 2004 and 27 October 2005). She has published a book entitled "500 Prayers for Catholic Schools and Parish Youth Groups".
