= Aslam Rana =

Canadian politician

Aslam Rana MP

Member of Parliament for Hamilton Centre
- Incumbent
- Assumed office April 28, 2025
- Preceded by: Matthew Green

Personal details
- Party: Liberal
- Education: Master's Degree, Civil (Transportation) Engineering
- Alma mater: Toronto Metropolitan University
- Website: aslamrana.liberal.ca

Aslam Rana is a Canadian politician and engineer who was elected as the member of Parliament for Hamilton Centre in the 2025 federal election as a member of the Liberal Party of Canada. His election ended more than twenty years of New Democratic Party representation in the riding.

== Early and personal life ==
Rana immigrated to Canada from Pakistan in 2003. He is a civil engineer and holds a master's degree from Toronto Metropolitan University.

Prior to his election, Rana lived in Mississauga, Ontario. He is the father of five children.

== Political career ==
Rana was one of three new Members of Parliament elected in Hamilton, Ontario in the 2025 election. His victory was notable as it represented the loss of a longtime NDP stronghold, previously held by MPs Matthew Green and David Christopherson. During his campaign, he received support from Prime Minister Mark Carney, who visited Hamilton Centre twice.

Following his election, Rana stated that he would focus on housing and infrastructure in the riding.

== Electoral record ==
2025 Canadian federal election: Hamilton Centre
Party	Candidate	Votes	%	±%	Expenditures
Liberal	Aslam Rana	21,388	37.6	+10.91	
Conservative	Hayden Lawrence	17,079	30.0	+13.42	
New Democratic	Matthew Green	16,581	29.1	–17.88	
Green	Sandy Crawley	818	1.4	–1.22	
People's	David Speicher	591	1.0	–5.54	
No affiliation	Carla Green	215	0.4	N/A	
Rhinoceros	Cody Chenier	190	0.3	N/A	
No affiliation	Michael Loomans	90	0.2	N/A	
Total valid votes/expense limit		56,952	99.2	—	
Total rejected ballots		480	0.8	—	
Turnout		57,432	62.9	+7.2	
Eligible voters		91,294			
Liberal gain from New Democratic		Swing		–1.26	
Source: Elections Canada
