= Hamilton West (provincial electoral district) =

Former provincial electoral district in Ontario, Canada

Ontario electoral district

Defunct provincial electoral district
- Legislature: Legislative Assembly of Ontario
- District created: 1966
- District abolished: 2004
- First contested: 1967
- Last contested: 2003

Hamilton West was a provincial electoral district in Ontario, Canada, that was represented in the Legislative Assembly of Ontario from 1894 to 1934 and from 1967 to 2007.

== Members of Provincial Parliament ==
This riding has elected the following members of the Legislative Assembly of Ontario:

| Assembly | Years | Member | Party |
|---|---|---|---|
Hamilton West; Riding created
| 8th | 1894–1898 | John Morison Gibson | Liberal |
| 9th | 1898–1902 | Edward Alexander Colquhoun | Conservative |
| 10th | 1902–1905 | John Strathearn Hendrie | Conservative |
| 11th | 1905–1908 | John Strathearn Hendrie | Conservative |
| 12th | 1908–1911 | John Strathearn Hendrie | Conservative |
| 13th | 1911–1914 | John Strathearn Hendrie | Conservative |
| 14th | 1914–1914 | John Strathearn Hendrie | Conservative |
| 14th | 1914–1919 | John Allan | Conservative |
| 15th | 1919–1923 | Walter Rollo | Labour |
| 16th | 1923–1926 | Arthur Campbell Garden | Conservative |
| 17th | 1926–1929 | Frederick Thomas Smye | Conservative |
| 18th | 1929–1930 | Frederick Thomas Smye | Conservative |
| 18th | 1931–1934 | D'Arcy Argue Counsell Martin | Conservative |
Riding dissolved
Riding re-created
| 28th | 1967–1971 | Ada Pritchard | Progressive Conservative |
| 29th | 1971–1975 | Jack McNie | Progressive Conservative |
| 30th | 1975–1977 | Stuart Lyon Smith | Liberal |
| 31st | 1977–1981 | Stuart Lyon Smith | Liberal |
| 32nd | 1981–1982 | Stuart Lyon Smith | Liberal |
| 32nd | 1982–1985 | Richard Allen | New Democratic |
| 33rd | 1985–1987 | Richard Allen | New Democratic |
| 34th | 1987–1990 | Richard Allen | New Democratic |
| 35th | 1990–1995 | Richard Allen | New Democratic |
| 36th | 1995–1999 | Lillian Ross | Progressive Conservative |
| 37th | 1999–2003 | David Christopherson | New Democratic |
| 38th | 2003–2007 | Judy Marsales | Liberal |
Riding dissolved into Hamilton Centre, Ancaster—Dundas—Flamborough—Westdale and Hamilton Mountain

== Provincial election results ==
=== 1967–2007 ===
2003 Ontario general election
| Party | Candidate | Votes | % | ±% |
|---|---|---|---|---|
| Liberal | Judy Marsales | 15,600 | 39.97 | +10.81 |
| New Democratic | Roy Adams | 13,468 | 34.50 | –3.34 |
| Progressive Conservative | Doug Brown | 8,185 | 20.97 | –8.73 |
| Family Coalition | Lynne Scime | 750 | 1.92 | +0.95 |
| Green | Jo Pavlov | 727 | 1.86 | +0.66 |
| Independent | Jamilé Ghaddar | 303 | 0.78 | – |
| Total valid votes | | 39,033 | 99.29 | |
| Total rejected, unmarked and declined ballots | | 279 | 0.71 | –0.60 |
| Turnout | | 39,312 | 55.28 | –2.59 |
| Eligible voters | | 71,111 | | |
| Liberal gain from New Democratic | | Swing | | +9.77 |
Source: Elections Ontario

1999 Ontario general election
| Party | Candidate | Votes | % | ±% | Expenditures |
|---|---|---|---|---|---|
| New Democratic | David Christopherson | 15,625 | 37.84 | +9.60 | $63,891.36 |
| Progressive Conservative | Lillian Ross | 12,261 | 29.70 | –10.84 | $58,588.68 |
| Liberal | Frank D'Amico | 12,037 | 29.15 | +2.00 | $48,994.28 |
| Green | Phyllis McColl | 495 | 1.20 | – | $6,090.89 |
| Family Coalition | Lynne Scime | 403 | 0.98 | –1.71 | $1,100.80 |
| Independent | Wendell Fields | 236 | 0.57 | – | $0 |
| Natural Law | Rita Rassenberg | 231 | 0.56 | –0.31 | $0 |
| Total valid votes | | 41,288 | 98.69 | | |
| Total rejected, unmarked and declined ballots | | 549 | 1.31 | –0.10 | |
| Turnout | | 41,837 | 57.87 | –9.13 | |
| Eligible voters | | 72,295 | | | |
| New Democratic gain from Progressive Conservative | | Swing | | +10.22 | |
Source: Elections Ontario

1995 Ontario general election
| Party | Candidate | Votes | % | ±% |
|---|---|---|---|---|
| Progressive Conservative | Lillian Ross | 13,301 | 40.54 | +27.23 |
| New Democratic | Richard Allen | 9,267 | 28.24 | –28.35 |
| Liberal | Helen M. Wilson | 8,911 | 27.16 | +5.08 |
| Family Coalition | Lynne Scime | 880 | 2.68 | –4.41 |
| Natural Law | Rita Rassenberg | 284 | 0.87 | – |
| Libertarian | Hans Wienhold | 169 | 0.52 | –0.42 |
| Total valid votes | | 32,812 | 98.59 | |
| Total rejected, unmarked and declined ballots | | 469 | 1.41 | –0.64 |
| Turnout | | 33,281 | 67.00 | –0.90 |
| Eligible voters | | 49,673 | | |
| Progressive Conservative gain from New Democratic | | Swing | | +11.08 |
Source: Elections Ontario

1990 Ontario general election
| Party | Candidate | Votes | % | ±% |
|---|---|---|---|---|
| New Democratic | Richard Allen | 18,550 | 56.59 | +14.13 |
| Liberal | Helen M. Wilson | 7,236 | 22.08 | –16.93 |
| Progressive Conservative | David Cairnie | 4,361 | 13.31 | –5.23 |
| Family Coalition | Lynne Scime | 2,324 | 7.09 | – |
| Libertarian | Hans Wienhold | 306 | 0.93 | – |
| Total valid votes | | 32,777 | 97.95 | |
| Total rejected, unmarked and declined ballots | | 686 | 2.05 | +1.59 |
| Turnout | | 33,463 | 67.90 | +3.04 |
| Eligible voters | | 49,285 | | |
| New Democratic hold | | Swing | | +15.53 |
Source: Elections Ontario

1987 Ontario general election
| Party | Candidate | Votes | % | ±% |
|---|---|---|---|---|
| New Democratic | Richard Allen | 13,430 | 42.46 | +5.05 |
| Liberal | Mary Kiss | 12,336 | 39.00 | +3.24 |
| Progressive Conservative | Don Ross | 5,862 | 18.53 | –6.11 |
| Total valid votes | | 31,628 | 99.54 | |
| Total rejected ballots | | 147 | 0.46 | –0.07 |
| Turnout | | 31,775 | 64.86 | +3.04 |
| Eligible voters | | 48,993 | | |
| New Democratic hold | | Swing | | +0.90 |
Source: Elections Ontario

1985 Ontario general election
| Party | Candidate | Votes | % | ±% |
|---|---|---|---|---|
| New Democratic | Richard Allen | 10,182 | 37.42 | –1.16 |
| Liberal | Paul Hanover | 9,732 | 35.76 | +5.68 |
| Progressive Conservative | Anne Jones | 6,705 | 24.64 | –5.94 |
| Independent | Ron Crawford | 496 | 1.82 | – |
| Independent | Val Haché | 97 | 0.36 | – |
| Total valid votes | | 27,212 | 99.46 | |
| Total rejected ballots | | 147 | 0.54 | –0.04 |
| Turnout | | 27,359 | 61.82 | +6.26 |
| Eligible voters | | 44,257 | | |
| New Democratic hold | | Swing | | –3.42 |
Source: Elections Ontario

Ontario provincial by-election, June 17, 1982 Resignation of Stuart Lyon Smith
| Party | Candidate | Votes | % | ±% |
|---|---|---|---|---|
| New Democratic | Richard Allen | 8,915 | 38.58 | +22.47 |
| Progressive Conservative | Robert McMurrich | 7,066 | 30.58 | –6.48 |
| Liberal | Joseph Barbera | 6,952 | 30.09 | –15.75 |
| Independent | John Turmel | 174 | 0.75 | – |
| Total valid votes | | 23,107 | 99.42 | |
| Total rejected ballots | | 134 | 0.58 | +0.01 |
| Turnout | | 23,241 | 55.56 | –4.82 |
| Eligible voters | | 41,831 | | |
| New Democratic gain from Liberal | | Swing | | +19.11 |
Source: Elections Ontario

1981 Ontario general election
| Party | Candidate | Votes | % | ±% |
|---|---|---|---|---|
| Liberal | Stuart Lyon Smith | 12,106 | 45.84 | +2.79 |
| Progressive Conservative | Alec Murray | 9,788 | 37.06 | +7.59 |
| New Democratic | Joy Warner | 4,255 | 16.11 | –10.86 |
| Communist | Elizabeth Rowley | 260 | 0.98 | – |
| Total valid votes | | 26,409 | 99.44 | |
| Total rejected ballots | | 150 | 0.56 | –0.02 |
| Turnout | | 26,559 | 60.38 | –9.27 |
| Eligible voters | | 43,987 | | |
| Liberal hold | | Swing | | –2.40 |
Source: Elections Ontario

1977 Ontario general election
| Party | Candidate | Votes | % | ±% |
|---|---|---|---|---|
| Liberal | Stuart Lyon Smith | 12,239 | 43.05 | +4.71 |
| Progressive Conservative | Maurice Carter | 8,379 | 29.47 | –6.91 |
| New Democratic | Marjorie Baskin | 7,668 | 26.97 | +1.69 |
| Independent | Lucylle Boikoff | 144 | 0.51 | – |
| Total valid votes | | 28,430 | 99.42 | |
| Total rejected ballots | | 166 | 0.58 | +0.16 |
| Turnout | | 28,596 | 69.65 | +3.69 |
| Eligible voters | | 41,056 | | |
| Liberal hold | | Swing | | +5.81 |
Source: Elections Ontario

1975 Ontario general election
| Party | Candidate | Votes | % | ±% |
|---|---|---|---|---|
| Liberal | Stuart Lyon Smith | 10,583 | 38.34 | +10.65 |
| Progressive Conservative | Bob Morrow | 10,041 | 36.38 | –7.14 |
| New Democratic | Ray Fazakas | 6,978 | 25.28 | –2.72 |
| Total valid votes | | 27,602 | 99.58 | |
| Total rejected ballots | | 117 | 0.42 | –0.78 |
| Turnout | | 27,719 | 65.96 | –7.90 |
| Eligible voters | | 42,021 | | |
| Liberal gain from Progressive Conservative | | Swing | | +6.69 |
Source: Elections Ontario

1971 Ontario general election
| Party | Candidate | Votes | % | ±% |
|---|---|---|---|---|
| Progressive Conservative | Jack McNie | 12,807 | 43.51 | +5.78 |
| New Democratic | William Freeman | 8,242 | 28.00 | –2.64 |
| Liberal | James D. McKeon | 8,150 | 27.69 | –3.93 |
| Communist | Donald A. Stewart | 233 | 0.79 | – |
| Total valid votes | | 29,432 | 98.80 | |
| Total rejected ballots | | 358 | 1.20 | +0.18 |
| Turnout | | 29,790 | 73.86 | +9.25 |
| Eligible voters | | 40,331 | | |
| Progressive Conservative hold | | Swing | | +4.21 |
Source: Elections Ontario

1967 Ontario general election
| Party | Candidate | Votes | % |
|---|---|---|---|
| Progressive Conservative | Ada Pritchard | 8,625 | 37.73 |
| Liberal | Vincent Agro | 7,227 | 31.62 |
| New Democratic | Joe Bothen | 7,005 | 30.65 |
| Total valid votes | | 22,857 | 98.97 |
| Total rejected ballots | | 237 | 1.03 |
| Turnout | | 23,094 | 64.61 |
| Eligible voters | | 35,744 | |
| Progressive Conservative pickup new district. | | | |
Source: Elections Ontario

=== 1894–1934 ===
==== 1931 by-election ====
Ontario provincial by-election, February 11, 1931 Death of Frederick Thomas Smye
| Party | Candidate | Votes | % | ±% |
|---|---|---|---|---|
| Conservative | D'Arcy Argue Counsell Martin | 5,768 | 52.00 | –23.93 |
| Labour | Elmore Philpott | 5,325 | 48.00 | – |
| Total valid votes | | 11,093 | 100.00 | |
| Total rejected ballots | | – | | |
| Turnout | | 11,093 | – | – |
| Eligible voters | | | | |
| Conservative hold | | Swing | | –23.93 |
Source: Elections Ontario

==== 1920s ====
1929 Ontario general election
| Party | Candidate | Votes | % | ±% |
|---|---|---|---|---|
| Conservative | Frederick Thomas Smye | 6,974 | 75.93 | +2.44 |
| Liberal | John A. Soule | 2,211 | 24.07 | –2.44 |
| Total valid votes | | 9,185 | 98.49 | |
| Total rejected ballots | | 141 | 1.51 | +0.74 |
| Turnout | | 9,326 | 51.54 | –14.18 |
| Eligible voters | | 18,093 | | |
| Conservative hold | | Swing | | +2.44 |
Source: Elections Ontario

1926 Ontario general election
| Party | Candidate | Votes | % | ±% |
|---|---|---|---|---|
| Conservative | Frederick Thomas Smye | 8,436 | 73.48 | +21.07 |
| Liberal | May Cascaden Carpenter | 3,044 | 26.52 | –1.15 |
| Total valid votes | | 11,480 | 99.23 | |
| Total rejected ballots | | 89 | 0.77 | –1.67 |
| Turnout | | 11,569 | 65.73 | +18.52 |
| Eligible voters | | 17,601 | | |
| Conservative hold | | Swing | | +11.11 |
Source: Elections Ontario

1923 Ontario general election
| Party | Candidate | Votes | % | ±% |
|---|---|---|---|---|
| Conservative | Arthur Campbell Garden | 5,784 | 52.42 | +24.24 |
| Liberal | Thomas McQuesten | 3,053 | 27.67 | +16.10 |
| Labour | Walter Rollo | 2,198 | 19.92 | –40.33 |
| Total valid votes | | 11,035 | 97.56 | |
| Total rejected ballots | | 276 | 2.44 | –1.44 |
| Turnout | | 11,311 | 47.21 | –24.33 |
| Eligible voters | | 23,957 | | |
| Conservative gain from Labour | | Swing | | +4.07 |
Source: Elections Ontario

==== 1900s & 1910s ====
Ontario provincial by-election, December 15, 1919 Ministerial by-election
| Party | Candidate | Votes |
|---|---|---|
| Labour | Walter Rollo | acclaimed |
Source: Elections Ontario

1919 Ontario general election
| Party | Candidate | Votes | % | ±% |
|---|---|---|---|---|
| Labour | Walter Rollo | 8,722 | 60.25 | – |
| Conservative | John A. McFarlane | 4,079 | 28.18 | – |
| Liberal | James Dixon | 1,675 | 11.57 | – |
| Total valid votes | | 14,476 | 96.12 | |
| Total rejected ballots | | 584 | 3.88 | – |
| Turnout | | 15,060 | 71.54 | – |
| Eligible voters | | 21,050 | | |
| Labour gain from Conservative | | Swing | | – |
Source: Elections Ontario

Ontario provincial by-election, November 18, 1914 John Strathearn Hendrie appointed Lieutenant Governor of Ontario
| Party | Candidate | Votes | % | ±% |
|---|---|---|---|---|
| Conservative | John Allan | 2,275 | 50.40 | –12.88 |
| Labour | Walter Rollo | 2,239 | 49.60 | – |
| Total valid votes | | 4,514 | 100.00 | |
| Total rejected ballots | | – | | |
| Turnout | | 4,514 | – | – |
| Eligible voters | | | | |
| Conservative hold | | Swing | | –6.44 |
Source: Elections Ontario

1914 Ontario general election
| Party | Candidate | Votes | % | ±% |
|---|---|---|---|---|
| Conservative | John Strathearn Hendrie | 3,361 | 63.28 | –6.02 |
| Liberal | James Edgar Davey | 1,950 | 36.72 | +6.02 |
| Total valid votes | | 5,311 | 98.83 | |
| Total rejected ballots | | 63 | 1.17 | –0.12 |
| Turnout | | 5,374 | 66.24 | +16.92 |
| Eligible voters | | 8,113 | | |
| Conservative hold | | Swing | | –6.02 |
Source: Elections Ontario

1911 Ontario general election
| Party | Candidate | Votes | % | ±% |
|---|---|---|---|---|
| Conservative | John Strathearn Hendrie | 2,594 | 69.30 | +6.09 |
| Liberal | James Russell | 1,149 | 30.70 | –0.96 |
| Total valid votes | | 3,743 | 98.71 | |
| Total rejected ballots | | 49 | 1.29 | –1.04 |
| Turnout | | 3,792 | 49.32 | –20.32 |
| Eligible voters | | 7,688 | | |
| Conservative hold | | Swing | | +3.52 |
Source: Elections Ontario

1908 Ontario general election
| Party | Candidate | Votes | % | ±% |
|---|---|---|---|---|
| Conservative | John Strathearn Hendrie | 3,121 | 63.22 | +9.53 |
| Liberal | William Hugh Wardrope | 1,563 | 31.66 | –14.66 |
| Independent | William Armstrong | 253 | 5.12 | – |
| Total valid votes | | 4,937 | 97.67 | |
| Total rejected ballots | | 118 | 2.33 | +1.49 |
| Turnout | | 5,055 | 69.65 | –11.13 |
| Eligible voters | | 7,258 | | |
| Conservative hold | | Swing | | +12.09 |
Source: Elections Ontario

1905 Ontario general election
| Party | Candidate | Votes | % | ±% |
|---|---|---|---|---|
| Conservative | John Strathearn Hendrie | 3,089 | 53.68 | +5.01 |
| Liberal | George S. Kerr | 2,665 | 46.32 | +0.70 |
| Total valid votes | | 5,754 | 99.16 | |
| Total rejected ballots | | 49 | 0.84 | –0.78 |
| Turnout | | 5,803 | 80.78 | +3.10 |
| Eligible voters | | 7,184 | | |
| Conservative hold | | Swing | | +2.85 |
Source: Elections Ontario

1902 Ontario general election
| Party | Candidate | Votes | % | ±% |
|---|---|---|---|---|
| Conservative | John Strathearn Hendrie | 2,422 | 48.67 | –3.99 |
| Liberal | S. F. Washington | 2,270 | 45.62 | –1.72 |
| Socialist | Robert Roadhouse | 195 | 3.92 | – |
| Independent Conservative | Edward Alexander Colquhoun | 89 | 1.79 | –50.87 |
| Total valid votes | | 4,976 | 98.38 | |
| Total rejected ballots | | 82 | 1.62 | +0.17 |
| Turnout | | 5,058 | 77.67 | –4.84 |
| Eligible voters | | 6,512 | | |
| Conservative hold | | Swing | | +2.85 |
Source: Elections Ontario

==== 1890s ====
1898 Ontario general election
| Party | Candidate | Votes | % | ±% |
|---|---|---|---|---|
| Conservative | Edward Alexander Colquhoun | 2,752 | 52.66 | – |
| Liberal | John Morison Gibson | 2,474 | 47.34 | –7.76 |
| Total valid votes | | 5,226 | 98.55 | |
| Total rejected ballots | | 77 | 1.45 | +0.48 |
| Turnout | | 5,303 | 82.51 | +3.71 |
| Eligible voters | | 6,427 | | |
| Conservative gain from Liberal | | Swing | | +3.88 |
Source: Elections Ontario

1894 Ontario general election
| Party | Candidate | Votes | % |
|---|---|---|---|
| Liberal | John Morison Gibson | 2,468 | 55.10 |
| Conservative-Protestant Protective | William Hancock | 2,011 | 44.90 |
| Total valid votes | | 4,479 | 99.03 |
| Total rejected ballots | | 44 | 0.97 |
| Turnout | | 4,523 | 78.80 |
| Eligible voters | | 5,740 | |
| Liberal pickup new district. | | | |
Source: Elections Ontario

== See also ==
- List of Ontario provincial electoral districts
- Canadian provincial electoral districts
