= Walter Rollo =

Canadian politician (1875–1957)

Walter Ritchie Rollo
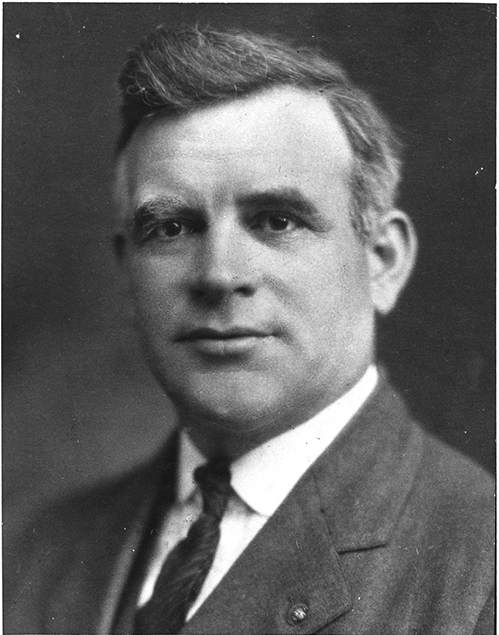
- Rollo in 1919 photograph

MPP for Hamilton West
- In office October 20, 1919 – October 5, 1923
- Preceded by: John Allan
- Succeeded by: Arthur Campbell Garden

Minister of Health and Labour for Ontario
- In office November 14, 1919 – July 16, 1923
- Preceded by: New office
- Succeeded by: Forbes Elliott Godfrey

Personal details
- Born: November 25, 1875 Linlithgowshire, Scotland
- Died: March 12, 1957 (aged 81) Hamilton, Ontario
- Resting place: Woodland Cemetery, Hamilton; Section 23 W 1/2, 43.286312°N 79.881421°W
- Party: Labour Party of Canada
- Spouse: Margaret Bell

Walter Ritchie Rollo (November 25, 1875 – March 12, 1957) was a Canadian trade unionist and politician in the early 20th century, and was a cabinet Minister in the United Farmers of Ontario - Labour coalition government from 1919 to 1923.

== Early life ==
Born in Linlithgowshire, Scotland in 1875, he emigrated to Canada in 1883, living in Parry Sound, Walkerville and Berlin before becoming a broom-maker in Hamilton, Ontario by 1899. He married Margaret Bell of Berlin in the same year.

When the 9lst Regiment Canadian Highlanders was formed in Hamilton in 1903, Rollo enlisted and rose over time to become its colour sergeant.

== Labour leader ==
Rollo was secretary of the Hamilton Trades and Labour Council from 1906 to 1919. In 1919, he also became editor of the Labor News, a Hamilton-based union paper.

== Political career ==
Rollo was involved in politics at all levels. In 1916, he was appointed as a member of Ontario's Organization of Resources Committee which was established to improve Canada's war effort in the Province. He had also been a member of the Board of Education in Hamilton for several years.

In 1907, Rollo was elected as the President of the newly formed Independent Labour Party, and would become its leader in 1917. He stood for election in Hamilton West in the following campaigns:

- in the 18 November 1914 by-election, which he lost by only 39 votes,
- in the federal 1917 general election, where he came in second,
- in the Ontario 1919 general election, which he won. In his campaign, signs were posted that read: "Your Vote for Walter Rollo is a nail in the coffin of the profiteer."

He and Morrison Mann MacBride were instrumental in negotiating a coalition government between the Independent Labour Party and the United Farmers of Ontario under E.C. Drury, which lasted until 1923. As a result of those negotiations, the ILP had the right to nominate two of its members to the new government: Rollo became the Province's first Minister of Health and Labour—in charge of a department that had been created immediately before the election by the previous Conservative government of William Hearst, as well as overseeing the Provincial Board of Health. Harry Mills became the first Minister of Mines. This caused a confrontation within the ILP, as MacBride had sought to be nominated to the Labour position.

During his time as Minister, Rollo brought in several enhancements to Ontario's labour laws:

- the Minimum Wage Act, which set minimum wages for female employees,
- the Wages Act was amended to provide that 70% of any wages due to a worker was exempt from seizure,
- the One Day's Rest in Seven Act, which provided (with certain exceptions) that employees were entitled to 24 consecutive hours of rest every seven days,
- improvements to workmen's compensation benefits

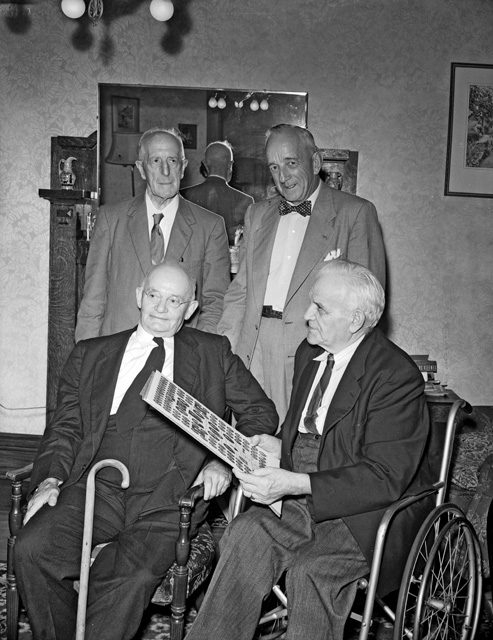
Rollo (at right) in 1955, with last surviving members of the 1919-1923 coalition

== Aftermath ==
After his defeat in the 1923 general election, Rollo was appointed as an adolescent school inspector for the City of Hamilton, and he was still working as a school attendance officer there in 1938, and as a part-time school assessment adviser in 1950. He died in 1957 at Hamilton General Hospital.

== Electoral record ==
1923 Ontario general election: Hamilton West
| Party | Candidate | Votes | % | ±% |
|---|---|---|---|---|
| Conservative | Arthur Garden | 5,784 | 52.4 | +24.2 |
| Liberal | Thomas McQuesten | 3,053 | 27.7 | +16.1 |
| Labour | Walter Rollo | 2,198 | 19.9 | -40.3 |
| Total valid votes | | 11,035 | 100.0 | |
| Total rejected ballots | | 276 | 3.9 | -2.7 |
| Turnout | | 11,311 | 47.2 | -24.3 |
| Eligible voters | | 23,957 | | |
| Conservative gain from Labour | | Swing | | +32.2% |

1919 Ontario general election: Hamilton West
| Party | Candidate | Votes | % | ±% |
|---|---|---|---|---|
| Labour | Walter Rollo | 8,722 | 60.2 | +60.2 |
| Conservative | John McFarlane | 4,079 | 28.2 | -35.1 |
| Liberal | James Dixon | 1,675 | 11.6 | -25.1 |
| Total valid votes | | 14,476 | 100.0 | |
| Total rejected ballots | | 584 | 3.9 | +2.7 |
| Turnout | | 15,060 | 71.5 | +5.3 |
| Eligible voters | | 21,050 | | |
