= D'Arcy Argue Counsell Martin =

Canadian politician

Argue Martin

Ontario MPP
- In office 1931–1934
- Preceded by: Frederick Thomas Smye
- Succeeded by: Ada Pritchard
- Constituency: Hamilton West

Personal details
- Born: D'Arcy Argue Counsell Martin; October 23, 1898 Hamilton, Ontario
- Died: June 7, 1992 (aged 93) Hamilton, Ontario
- Party: Conservative

D'Arcy Argue Counsell Martin (October 23, 1898 – June 7, 1992) was a Canadian lawyer and political figure. He represented Hamilton West in the Legislative Assembly of Ontario from 1931 to 1934 as a Conservative member.

Martin served on Hamilton city council from 1927 to 1931. In 1931, he was named a King's Counsel. He passed a private member's bill to establish the Hamilton Community Foundation, a philanthropic organization, and served as its first president from 1954 to 1956. Martin was chairman of the board for the Hamilton Harbour Commission and served as chancellor for McMaster University.

He was a descendant of Richard Martin of Ireland, 1753–1834.

He died in June 1992, seven months after being hit by a car on his way to church. He was 93.
