= Lillian Ross (politician) =

Canadian politician

Ontario MPP
- In office 1995–1999
- Preceded by: Richard Allen
- Succeeded by: David Christopherson
- Constituency: Hamilton West

Personal details
- Born: 1944 (age 81–82) Hamilton, Ontario
- Party: Progressive Conservative
- Spouse: Don Ross
- Children: 2
- Occupation: Real estate agent, business owner

Lillian Ross (born c. 1944) is a former politician in Ontario, Canada. She was a Progressive Conservative member of the Legislative Assembly of Ontario from 1995 to 1999.

== Background ==
Ross was born and raised in Hamilton, Ontario. She worked as a real estate agent and owned a women's clothing store. She was married to Don Ross, a Hamilton city councillor. Together they raised two children.

== Politics ==
Ross was elected to the Ontario legislature in the 1995 provincial election, defeating incumbent New Democrat Richard Allen by over 4,000 votes in the riding of Hamilton West. Ross served as a backbench supporter of Mike Harris's government for the next four years. In 1997 she was appointed as Parliamentary Assistant to the Minister of Consumer and Commercial Relations.

In the 1999 provincial election, Ross lost to NDP Member of Provincial Parliament (MPP) David Christopherson by over 3,000 votes, after Christopherson's old riding of Hamilton Centre was eliminated by redistribution.
