= John Strathearn Hendrie =

Canadian politician (1857–1923)

The Honourable Sir John Strathearn Hendrie KCMG CVO
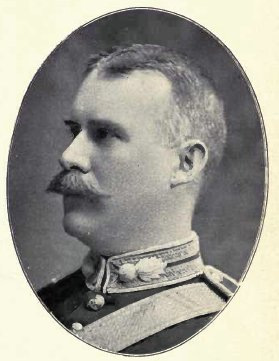

11th Lieutenant Governor of Ontario
- In office September 26, 1914 – November 20, 1919
- Monarch: George V
- Governors General: The Duke of Connaught and Strathearn; The Duke of Devonshire
- Premier: William Howard Hearst; Ernest Charles Drury
- Preceded by: John Morison Gibson
- Succeeded by: Lionel Herbert Clarke

Member of the Legislative Assembly of Ontario
- In office May 29, 1902 – September 26, 1914
- Preceded by: Edward Alexander Colquhoun
- Succeeded by: John Allan
- Constituency: Hamilton West

Personal details
- Born: August 15, 1857 Hamilton, Upper Canada
- Died: July 17, 1923 (aged 65) Baltimore, Maryland, U.S.
- Resting place: Hamilton Cemetery
- Party: Conservative
- Spouse: Lena Henderson (1885)
- Children: 3 (1 daughter and 2 sons)
- Parent: William & Mary Hendrie
- Education: Upper Canada College
- Occupation: Politician
- Profession: Railway contractor, engineer, businessman, militia officer
- Cabinet: Minister Without Portfolio (1905-1914)

Sir John Strathearn Hendrie KCMG CVO (August 15, 1857 – July 17, 1923) was the 11th Lieutenant Governor of Ontario from 1914 to 1919.

John Hendrie was born in 1857 in Hamilton, Canada West and was educated at Upper Canada College. He became a railway contractor and promoted the Hamilton Bridge Works. In 1885 he married Lena Henderson. He was Mayor of Hamilton, Ontario from 1901 to 1902. He was then Member of Provincial Parliament from 1902 to 1914, where he held the positions of Minister without Portfolio and Hydro-Electric Commissioner. He joined the Hamilton Field Artillery in 1883 and later commanded the 2nd Brigade, Canadian Field Artillery (of the Canadian Militia) until 1909. Hendrie was appointed Lieutenant Governor of Ontario in 1914 and served until 1919. Much of his time in Office was spent contributing to the War Effort and hosting soldiers, seamen and dignitaries. He is the only Ontario viceroy to live at two Government Houses, including Chorley Park. He was knighted in 1915, and died in Baltimore, Maryland, in 1923.

Government offices
Preceded by Sir John Morison Gibson	Lieutenant Governor of Ontario; 1914–1919	Succeeded by Lionel Herbert Clarke
