= Kathryn Colquhoun =

Canadian writer

Kathryn E. Colquhoun (January 29, 1884 – July 11, 1958) was a Canadian writer.

The daughter of Edward Alexander Colquhoun and Evelyn Esther Gourlay, she was born Evelyn Kate Colquhoun in Hamilton, Ontario and was educated there and at the Hamilton Arts School, where she earned a teacher's certificate. She studied illustration in New York City and worked there as a writer and illustrator. In 1928, she published The Battle of St. Julien and other poems. She published two plays in 1937 and another volume of poetry The Net of Dreams in 1942. Colquhoun also wrote plays and songs for performance on radio. She retired to Vancouver. She was a member of the Canadian Authors Association.
