= Arthur Campbell Garden =

Canadian politician

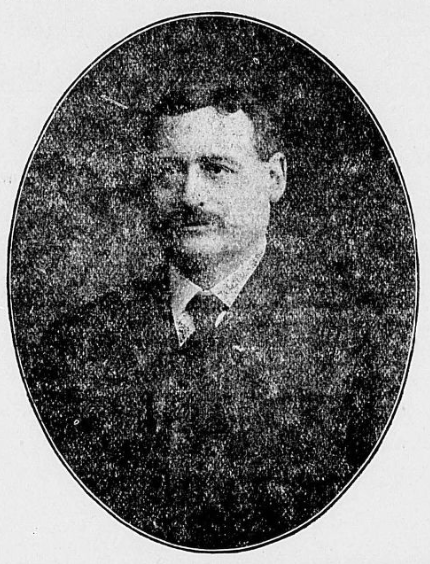
- Garden on being named Warden of Simcoe County (1910)

Ontario MPP
- In office June 25, 1923 – October 18, 1926
- Preceded by: Walter Rollo
- Succeeded by: Frederick Thomas Smye
- Constituency: Hamilton West

Warden of Simcoe County
- In office 1910–1910
- Preceded by: Richard Bell
- Succeeded by: James Moore

Personal details
- Born: August 9, 1860 Stamford, Canada West
- Died: May 19, 1927 (aged 66) Hamilton, Ontario
- Party: Conservative
- Profession: Commercial traveller, manager

Arthur Campbell Garden (August 9, 1860 – May 19, 1927) was an Ontario businessman. He represented Hamilton West in the Legislative Assembly of Ontario from 1923 to 1926 as a Conservative member.

== Early life ==
Born in Stamford (Note: now part of Niagara Falls) in Welland County, Garden received his schooling in Thorold. After marrying in 1884, he moved to Barrie to work as a commercial traveller for Dominion Drug. He was known for joining many local philanthropic activities.

== Political life ==
=== Municipal ===
Garden was first elected as a councillor in Barrie's 1893 election, and later returned to be elected alderman in 1906. He was subsequently acclaimed in the next four elections, as Deputy-Reeve in 1907 and as Reeve in 1908–1910, thus becoming involved in Simcoe County politics. The Barrie Examiner noted in 1910 that "his name has been mentioned in connection with the nomination for the Legislature." During his time on County Council, he was chairman of the committee that was responsible for the publication of a history of the county.

In 1910, he was named Warden of Simcoe County, but the Northern Advance noted that "It was the most strenuous contest seen in years." It took eight ballots for him to finally win.

After 1910, he was transferred to Hamilton to become a manager at National Drug & Chemical, as Dominion Drug was now known as.

=== Provincial ===
In both Barrie and Hamilton, Garden was a Conservative who was actively involved in provincial politics. He would be elected to the Legislative Assembly of Ontario in the 1923 election, but declined to seek reelection in 1926 because of ill health.

Garden died in Hamilton in 1927, aged 66.
