= Stouffville College =

College in Toronto, Ontario, Canada

Coordinates: 43.72382°N 79.33721°W

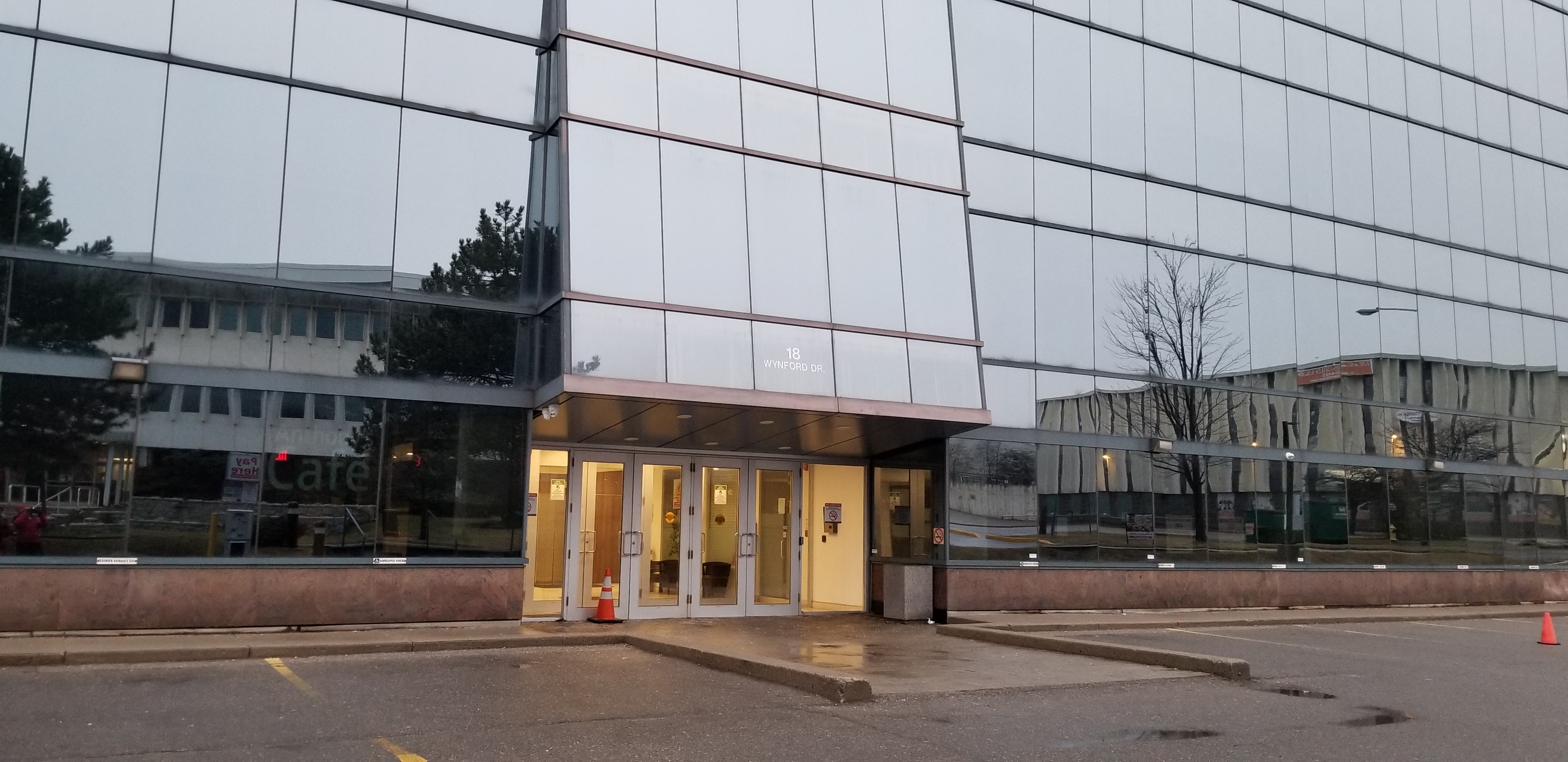
Location of former Stouffville College

Stouffville College (SC) was a for-profit college in Toronto, Ontario, Canada. The college had students from over 60 countries making up approximately half of the students' population. In February 2013, the college was ordered by the Ministry of Training, Colleges and Universities of Ontario to seize its operations for operating without a license.
