= Edward Alexander Colquhoun =

Canadian politician

Edward Alexander Colquhoun (September 14, 1844 – November 16, 1904) was mayor of Hamilton, Ontario, Canada from 1897 to 1898. He represented Hamilton West in the Legislative Assembly of Ontario from 1898 to 1902 as a Conservative member.

The son of James Colquhoun, a barrister, he was born in Ayr, Canada West and was educated in Berlin, Ontario (later Kitchener). In 1864, Colquhoun began work with the Bank of Montreal in Ottawa, He joined the Bank of Hamilton in 1872; he became bank manager in 1882 and retired in 1887. In 1881, Colquhoun married Evelyn Gourlay. The family lived in Barton lodge on the Hamilton mountain, which had been built by James Matthew Whyte, who was Colquhoun's wife's uncle.

He was elected to the Ontario assembly in 1898, but was defeated when he ran for re-election in 1902, running as an independent. He died two years later following surgery to remove a growth from his neck.

His daughter Kathryn became a writer.

Colquhoun Park in Hamilton was created as a memoriam to the Colquhoun estate in a land agreement that was made through expropriation and subsequently broken.
