= Frederick Thomas Smye =

Canadian politician

MPP for Hamilton West
- In office December 01, 1926 – November 15, 1930

Personal details
- Born: July 4, 1868 Hamilton, Ontario
- Died: November 15, 1930 (aged 62) Hamilton, Ontario
- Party: Progressive Conservative Party of Ontario

Frederick Thomas Smye (July 4, 1868 – November 15, 1930) was an Ontario political figure. He represented Hamilton West in the Legislative Assembly of Ontario from 1926 to 1930 as a Conservative member.

He was born and educated in Hamilton, Ontario, the son of William Smye, whose father was an Irish immigrant. In 1922, he married Hazel Stephenson. He served as Minister Without Portfolio in the provincial cabinet from 1929 to 1930. He died on November 15, 1930.

His son Frederick Thomas Smye, Jr. was later president of Avro Aircraft Limited.

Legislative Assembly of Ontario
Preceded by Arthur Campbell Garden	MPP for Hamilton West; 1926-1930	Succeeded by D'Arcy Argue Counsell Martin
