= Matthew Green (Canadian politician) =

Canadian politician

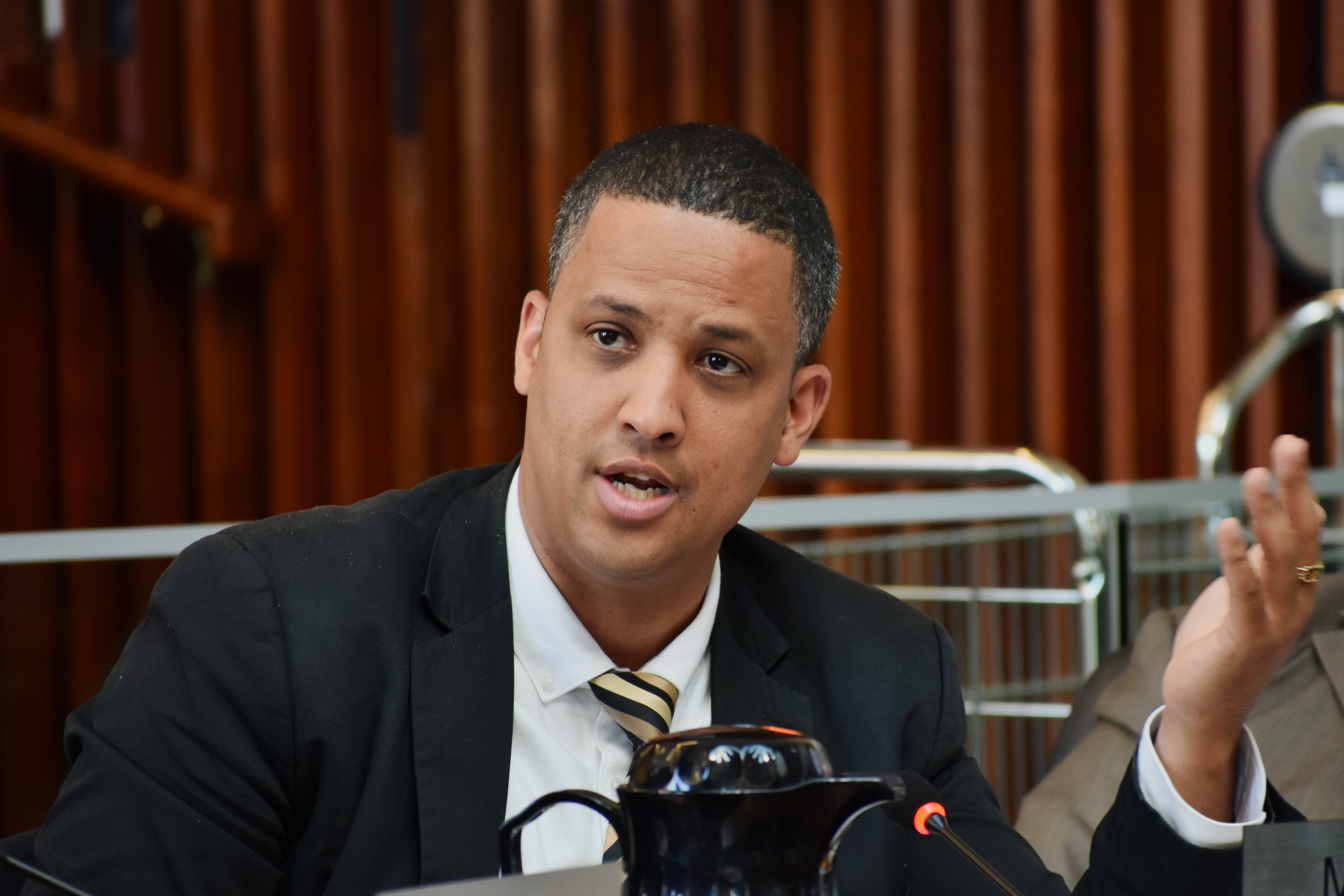
- Green in 2017

Interim National Director of the New Democratic Party
- In office May 21, 2026 – September 3, 2026
- Leader: Avi Lewis
- Preceded by: Lucy Watson
- Succeeded by: François Picard

Member of Parliament for Hamilton Centre
- In office October 21, 2019 – March 23, 2025
- Preceded by: David Christopherson
- Succeeded by: Aslam Rana

Hamilton City Councillor
- In office December 1, 2014 – December 1, 2018
- Preceded by: Bob Morrow
- Succeeded by: Nrinder Nann
- Constituency: Ward 3 (Hamilton Centre)

Personal details
- Born: September 10, 1980 (age 45) Hamilton, Ontario, Canada
- Party: New Democratic Party

Matthew Green (born September 10, 1980) is a Canadian politician, political organizer and activist who represented the riding of Hamilton Centre in the House of Commons of Canada from 2019 to 2025. A member of the New Democratic Party (NDP), he was elected in the 2019 Canadian federal election and re-elected in 2021. He was unseated in the 2025 Canadian federal election by Liberal candidate Aslam Rana.

On May 21, 2026, Green was appointed interim national director of the New Democratic Party of Canada.

== Early and personal life ==
Green was born and raised in Hamilton, the son of Raymond Green, a former ironworker, and Susan Scharf-Green, a retired school teacher. His maternal grandparents were Doris (Forward) and Nelson Scharf (who had a cheese factory), and his uncle was David Scharf. He received a BA degree in political science and legal studies from Acadia University.

=== Controversy ===
In April 2016, Green was standing under a bridge, kitty corner from a bus stop, when he was questioned for one minute by Constable Andrew Pfeifer of the Hamilton Police Service, who was in his car. Green, a vocal anti-carding advocate, filed a complaint with the Hamilton Police Service, saying he was clearly just on his phone and waiting for a bus, and that he felt racially profiled and "psychologically detained" by Pfeifer's questioning. Pfeifer said it was a cold and windy day, and that Green was standing in an unusual spot, in an area with three lodging homes for people with mental health issues, so the constable wanted to check that Green was OK. As a result of the complaint, the officer was charged with discreditable conduct under the Ontario Police Services Act. Green also filed a human rights complaint.

After a five-day hearing in April 2018, Constable Pfeifer was found not guilty by a tribunal chaired by a fellow police officer. The hearing concluded that the officer's actions were reasonable under the circumstances and did not constitute misconduct under the Police Services Act.

== Political career ==
Green said that the example set by Lincoln Alexander, the first Black Canadian MP and a former Hamilton politician, helped inspire him to get into politics. Green joined the NDP in 2017 after being inspired by Jagmeet Singh's stance against racial profiling.

Elected as the first Black Canadian to serve on the Hamilton City Council, where he represented inner-city Ward 3 from 2014 to 2018, he lobbied for the city to become the first in Ontario to license and regulate payday lending. In 2018, he became the executive director of the Hamilton Centre for Civic Inclusion (HCCI), a non-profit organization that promotes racial equality. Ideologically, Green identifies as a "Stanley Knowles New Democrat".

After his defeat in 2025, Green worked with the Amalgamated Transit Union and was appointed NDP interim national director in May 2026.

=== 43rd Canadian Parliament ===
Green was the first Black Canadian to represent Hamilton in Parliament since Lincoln Alexander. As an MP, Green was an outspoken opponent of police brutality, and endorsed a nationwide ban on the use of tear gas.

=== 44th Canadian Parliament ===
Green was re-elected on 20 September 2021 in the 2021 Canadian federal election to a hung parliament, its 44th Canadian Parliament.

In March 2022, NDP leader Jagmeet Singh nominated Green to serve on the Special Joint Committee on the Declaration of Emergency which had the mission to investigate the Freedom Convoy.

During his time in Parliament, Green introduced Bill C-222, An Act to amend the Income Tax Act (travel expenses deduction for tradespersons), in 2021. The bill sought to allow tradespeople to deduct travel expenses related to temporary worksites.

During the 44th Parliament, Green had roles with four committees. Green was a member and joint chair of DECD: Special Joint Committee on the Declaration of Emergency, and said that committee members "have a 'responsibility' to work together" in light of the disagreement of the Conservative Official Opposition over the constitution of the committee. It consisted of seven MPs and four senators. He was also a member of PROC: Standing Committee on Procedure and House Affairs, ETHI: Standing Committee on Access to Information, Privacy and Ethics, and SETH: Subcommittee on Agenda and Procedure of the Standing Committee on Access to Information, Privacy and Ethics.

Green was the NDP Critic of Ethics, and the Deputy Critic for Employment and Workforce Development, Deputy Critic for Labour, and Deputy Critic for Public Services and Procurement.

== Political positions ==
In July 2021, Green endorsed a national wealth tax.

=== Palestine ===
In July 2020, Green mistakenly accused Israel of stopping a COVID-19 testing center in Hebron, and condemned Israel for it. When his error was pointed out, Green deleted his post.

In November 2023, Green criticized Canada's lack of action for Palestinian victims of what he called ethnic cleansing and collective punishment.

Green has spoken at pro-Palestine demonstrations in support of a ceasefire. In January 2024, Green was one of five Canadian MPs (two other NDP, and two Liberal) to travel to the West Bank and Jordan to meet with Palestinian refugees, aid workers, Canadian consular officials and Jewish peace activists. The trip was sponsored by The Canadian Muslim Vote, a registered Canadian charity that engages Canadian Muslim communities in civic participation. Green shared video footage on his Instagram account of the Jenin Refugee Camp, calling attention to decimated infrastructure and an expanding graveyard. The trip followed Canada's vote in favour for a humanitarian ceasefire between Israel and Hamas at the United Nations General Assembly on December 12, 2023 (UNGA Resolution ES-10/22).

=== Anti-poverty initiatives ===
Green advocates for community-led anti-poverty initiatives. Green has opposed predatory payday lenders, referring to them as promoting "economic violence". Green has also criticized what he called the federal government's slow reaction to protect Canadians amidst the cost-of-living crisis. Affordable housing was also a key platform point on his most recent campaign.

== Electoral record ==
2025 Canadian federal election: Hamilton Centre
Party	Candidate	Votes	%	±%	Expenditures
Liberal	Aslam Rana	21,388	37.55	+10.82	$88,993.76
Conservative	Hayden Lawrence	17,079	29.99	+13.47	$20,659.66
New Democratic	Matthew Green	16,581	29.11	–17.85	$118,359.33
Green	Sandy Crawley	818	1.44	–1.22	$0.00
People's	David Speicher	591	1.04	–5.53	$3,548.05
No affiliation	Carla Green	215	0.38	N/A	$40.38
Rhinoceros	Cody Chenier	190	0.33	N/A	$0.00
No affiliation	Michael Loomans	90	0.16	N/A	$0.00
Total valid votes/expense limit		56,952	99.16	—	$137,065.55
Total rejected ballots		480	0.84	—	
Turnout		57,432	62.91	+7.21	
Eligible voters		91,294			
Liberal notional gain from New Democratic		Swing		–1.26	
Source: Elections Canada

2021 Canadian federal election: Hamilton Centre
Party	Candidate	Votes	%	±%	Expenditures
New Democratic	Matthew Green	20,105	48.70	+2.54	$59,357.46
Liberal	Margaret Bennett	10,941	26.50	-2.17	$33,346.62
Conservative	Fabian Grenning	6,209	15.04	+0.67	none listed
People's	Kevin Barber	2,637	6.39	+4.50	$0.00
Green	Avra Caroline Weinstein	1,105	2.68	-4.96	$3,627.12
Communist	Nigel Cheriyan	184	0.45	–	$0.00
Independent	Nathalie Xian Yi Yan	99	0.24	+0.05	$0.00
Total valid votes/expense limit		41,280	99.16	–	$120,288.26
Total rejected ballots		351	0.84	–	
Turnout		41,631	55.72	-3.36	
Eligible voters		74,721			
New Democratic hold		Swing		+2.35	
Source: Elections Canada

2019 Canadian federal election: Hamilton Centre
Party	Candidate	Votes	%	±%	Expenditures
New Democratic	Matthew Green	20,368	46.16	+0.60	$71,015.33
Liberal	Jasper Kujavsky	12,651	28.67	-4.72	$79,469.65
Conservative	Monica Ciriello	6,341	14.37	-0.28	$13,186.90
Green	Jason Lopez	3,370	7.64	+3.31	none listed
People's	Melina Mamone	833	1.89	–	none listed
Christian Heritage	Gary Duyzer	182	0.41	–	none listed
Independent	Tony Lemma	158	0.36	–	$2,716.24
Independent	Edward Graydon	134	0.30	–	none listed
Independent	Nathalie Xian Yi Yan	85	0.19	–	none listed
Total valid votes/expense limit		44,122	99.09		
Total rejected ballots		405	0.91	+0.26	
Turnout		44,527	59.08	-0.34	
Eligible voters		75,371			
New Democratic hold		Swing		+2.66	
Source: Elections Canada

Candidates for the October 27, 2014 Hamilton, Ontario Ward Three Councillor Election
Candidate	Popular vote			Expenditures
Candidate	Votes	%	±%	Expenditures
Matthew Green	2,852	40.72%	–	$31,380.20
Ralph Agostino	1,229	17.55%	–	$22,900.91
Drina Omazic	825	11.78%	–	$27,000.76
Mark DiMillo	525	7.50%	−2.63%	n/a^{1}
Sean Gibson	361	5.15%	−8.53%	n/a^{1}
Tim Simmons	334	4.77%	–	$15,087.14
Bob Assadourian	330	4.71%	–	$26,412.29
Brian Kelly	172	2.46%	–	$5,670.73
Maria Anastasiou	93	1.33%	–	n/a^{1}
Byron Wayne Millette	73	1.04%	–	n/a^{1}
Eva John	55	0.79%	–	n/a^{1}
Carlos Pinho	51	0.73%	–	n/a^{1}
Victor Mejia	42	0.60%	–	n/a^{1}
Bernie Szajkowski	41	0.59%	–	$0
Jol Hess	21	0.30%	–	n/a^{1}
Total votes	7,113	29.59%	−1.41	
Registered voters	24,035	100%		
^{1} These candidates did not submit official Financial Statements and are, therefore, ineligible to run in the 2018 Municipal election Note: All Hamilton Municipal Elections are officially non-partisan. Note: Candidate campaign colours are based on the prominent colour used in campaign items (signs, literature, etc.) and are used as a visual differentiation between candidates.
Sources: City of Hamilton, "Nominated Candidates" Archived 2010-08-20 at the Wayback Machine
