= Jack McNie =

Canadian politician

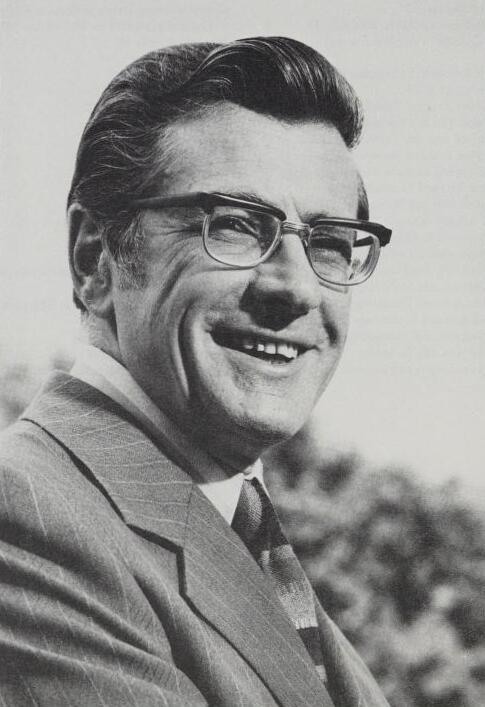
- McNie, c. 1972

Ontario MPP
- In office 1971–1975
- Preceded by: Ada Pritchard
- Succeeded by: Stuart Lyon Smith
- Constituency: Hamilton West

Personal details
- Born: July 28, 1920 Scotland, United Kingdom
- Died: September 2, 2006 (aged 86) Hamilton, Ontario
- Party: Progressive Conservative
- Spouse: Mary Kathleen Skeans
- Children: 5
- Profession: Advertising executive

John Duncan McNie (July 28, 1920 – September 2, 2006) was a politician in Ontario, Canada. He was a Progressive Conservative who served in the Legislative Assembly of Ontario from 1971 until 1975 representing the riding of Hamilton West. He served in the cabinet of Bill Davis from 1972 to 1975.

== Background ==
McNie was born in Scotland. He emigrated to Canada, settled in Hamilton, Ontario and married Mary Kathleen Skeans (1929–1980). Prior to being elected, McNie managed Kelley Advertising from the mid-1950s to 1971.

== Politics ==
Before being elected, McNie was involved as a back room organizer. In the 1961 Progressive Conservative Party of Ontario leadership election, he managed the campaign of finance minister James Allan, who was in fourth place in first ballot but only twenty votes behind front runner Kelso Roberts and thirteen votes behind eventual winner John Robarts. Allan's campaign stalled after the first ballot, and was the only contender among the four frontrunners to post a lower tally on the second ballot.

McNie was elected as MPP for Hamilton West in the 1971 Ontario general election, succeeding Ada Prichard, the only woman in the PC caucus in the 28th Parliament (two new PC women candidate were elected that year however). In 1972 he was appointed to cabinet as Minister of Colleges and Universities. In 1974 he was demoted to the position of Minister without portfolio. McNie had asked Davis to reduce his workload for health reasons. He did not stand for re election in the 1975 general election.

=== Cabinet posts ===
Davis ministry, Province of Ontario (1971–1985)
Cabinet posts (2)
Predecessor	Office	Successor
George Kerr	Minister of Colleges and Universities; 1972–1974	James Auld
Sub-Cabinet Post
Predecessor	Title	Successor
	Minister without portfolio (1974–1975)	

== Later life ==
After leaving politics, he has served as a Co-Chair of the "Committee for Hamilton Place", as a Director at The Hamilton Council for a United Canada and as a Director of a private company, Maplex Management & Holdings Limited.

McNie died in Hamilton, Ontario.
