= Richard Allen (Canadian politician) =

Canadian historian and politician (1929–2019)

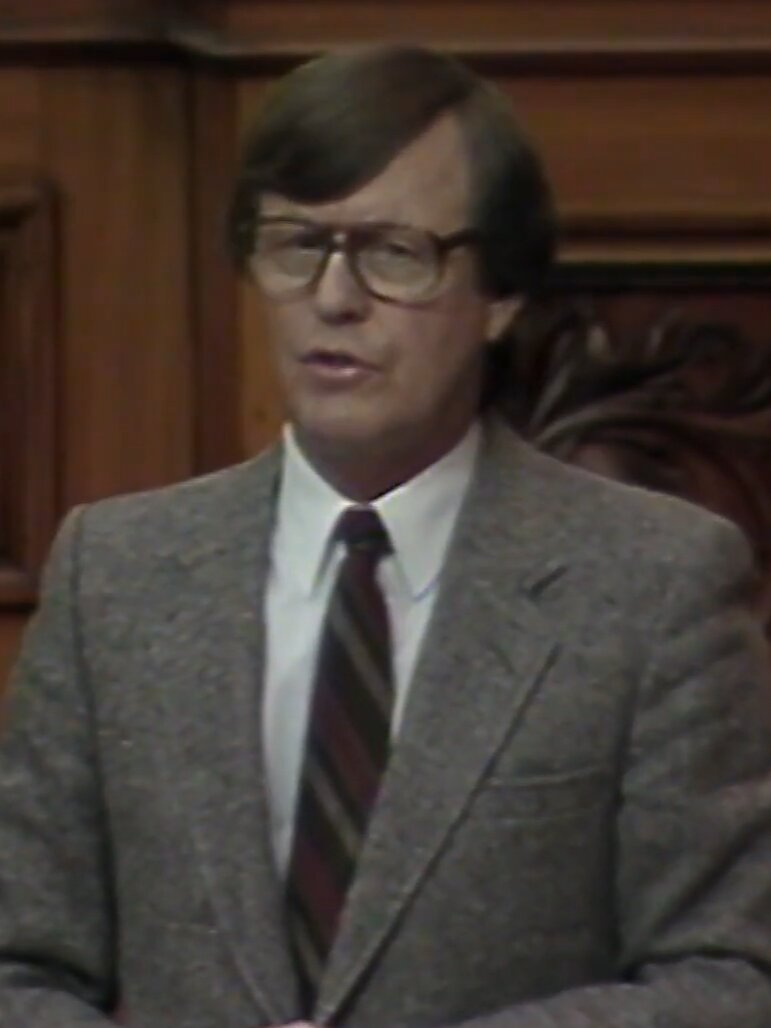
- Allen in 1986

Ontario MPP
- In office 1982–1995
- Preceded by: Stuart Lyon Smith
- Succeeded by: Lillian Ross
- Constituency: Hamilton West

Personal details
- Born: February 10, 1929 Vancouver, British Columbia
- Died: March 5, 2019 (aged 90) Hamilton, Ontario
- Party: New Democrat
- Spouse: Nettie Shewchuk
- Children: 2
- Occupation: Historian

Richard Alexander Allen (February 10, 1929 – March 5, 2019) was a historian and former politician in Ontario, Canada. He sat as a New Democratic Party member of the Legislative Assembly of Ontario from 1982 to 1995, and was a cabinet minister in the government of Bob Rae.

== Background ==
Allen was born and raised in Vancouver, British Columbia. He has a Bachelor of Arts degree from the University of Toronto, a Master's Degree from the University of Saskatchewan and a Ph.D. from Duke University. He was a professor at the University of Regina from 1964 to 1974 where he initiated interdisciplinary prairie studies and founded the Canadian Plans Research Centre. He taught at McMaster University in Hamilton, Ontario as senior Canadian historian from 1974 to 1987. He and his wife Nettie have two children.

== Historian ==
Allen's career began with history and he specialized in Christian socialism within Canada. In 1971, he published a work entitled The Social Passion, chronicling the history of the Canadian social gospel from the 1890s to 1929. In the book he proposed that the social gospel supplied the reform movement with a type of ideology. He said it ultimately failed because the concept translated poorly between English and Canadian society and that the structure of the churches did not lend itself to promoting social change. The book was criticized because it focused too strongly on central Canada and ignored trends in the Maritimes and Western Canada.

In addition to The Social Passion, Allen has published Region of the Mind: Interpreting the Western Canadian Plains (1973), Religion and society in the prairie west (1975) and Man and Nature on the Prairie (1976), and was the editor of a collection entitled The Social Gospel in Canada (1975). In 1998 he published a family history, "Sun Bright and Well Beloved: Three Hundred Years of a North American Family and their Farther Past," hailed in the Canadian Historical Review as setting a new standard for family history in Canada. He has also written several articles on Salem Bland, a prominent Canadian Christian socialist (1859–1950). In 2008 Allen published volume one of his biography of Salem Bland, The View from Murney Tower: Salem Bland, the Late Victorian Controversies, and the Search for a New Christianity.

=== List of works ===
- The Social Passion, 1971
- Region of the Mind: Interpreting the Western Canadian Plains, 1973
- Religion and society in the prairie west, 1975
- Man and Nature on the Prairie, 1976
- The Social Gospel in Canada (editor), 1975
- Sun Bright and Well Beloved: Three Hundred Years of a North American Family and their Farther Past, 1998
- The View from Murney Tower: Salem Bland, the Late Victorian Controversies, and the Search for a New Christianity, 2008

== Politics ==
Allen was elected to the Ontario legislature in a by-election held on June 17, 1982, defeating Liberal Joe Barbara and replacing former Liberal leader Stuart Smith as the Member of Provincial Parliament (MPP) for Hamilton West. He was re-elected over Liberal Paul Hanover by 450 votes in the 1985 provincial election, and defeated Liberal Mary Kiss by 1,096 votes in the provincial election of 1987.

In 1983, Allen introduced a resolution calling for Ontario to be made a nuclear-free zone. It was defeated by a vote of 63 to 38. As the NDP critic for Constitutional Affairs and a member of l'Association interparlementaire de langue francaise, Allen was a vocal supporter of the Meech Lake Accord, and with Liberal critic, Charles Beer, drafted the Ontario Legislature's official report on the Accord.

=== In government ===
The NDP won the provincial election of 1990. Given his academic background, Allen was appointed Minister of Colleges and Universities and Minister of Skills Development on October 1, 1990. He was also charged with creating an Ontario Training and Adjustment Board to establish a comprehensive training program in Ontario.

In the cabinet shuffle of February 3, 1993, Allen was asked to become a Minister Without Portfolio in order to take responsibility for international trade. On August 22, 1994, he was re-appointed to a full cabinet position as Minister of Housing.

The NDP were defeated in the provincial election of 1995, and Allen lost the Hamilton West riding to Progressive Conservative Lillian Ross by over 4,000 votes. Allen moved on to become chairperson of the Board of Wesley Urban Ministries in Hamilton (1996–2001) and resumed a career of historical research and writing.

Rae ministry, Province of Ontario (1990–1995)
Cabinet posts (3)
Predecessor	Office	Successor
Evelyn Gigantes	Minister of Housing; 1994–1995	Al Leach
Sean Conway	Minister of Skills Development; 1990–1993	'Position abolished^{1}'
Sean Conway	Ministry of Colleges and Universities; 1990–1993	'Position abolished^{1}'
Notes and references
1. The ministry was folded into an Education super-ministry led by Dave Cooke.
