= Ada Pritchard =

Canadian politician

Ontario MPP
- In office 1967–1971
- Preceded by: Riding re-established
- Succeeded by: Jack McNie
- Constituency: Hamilton West
- In office 1963–1967
- Preceded by: Bill Warrender
- Succeeded by: Norm Davison
- Constituency: Hamilton Centre

Personal details
- Born: January 19, 1898 Alnwick, England
- Died: June 9, 1987 (aged 89) Dundas, Ontario
- Party: Progressive Conservative
- Spouse: Charles Harry Pritchard
- Children: 1

Ada Mary Pritchard (January 19, 1898 – June 9, 1987) was a politician in Ontario, Canada. She was a Progressive Conservative member of the Legislative Assembly of Ontario from 1963 to 1971 who represented the ridings of Hamilton Centre and Hamilton West.

== Background ==
Pritchard was born in England, to James Dickenson Newton and Agnes Mary McInnes. She married Charles Harry Pritchard and they had one daughter, Kathleen. They emigrated to Canada in 1926 and settled in Hamilton, Ontario. She died in 1987.

== Politics ==
Pritchard ran for city council in Hamilton in 1950 but failed to win a seat. She tried again the following year, this time being successful. In 1956 she was successful in gaining a seat on the executive Board of Control, a more powerful position.

In the 1963 provincial election she ran as the Progressive Conservative candidate in the riding of Hamilton Centre. She defeated NDP candidate Bill Scandlan by 578 votes. In 1967 provincial election, she ran in a newly redistributed riding of Hamilton West. She defeated Liberal candidate Vincent Agro by nearly 1,400 votes.

In 1970, she announced her intention to retire from politics.
