= John Allan (Canadian politician) =

Canadian politician (1856–1922)

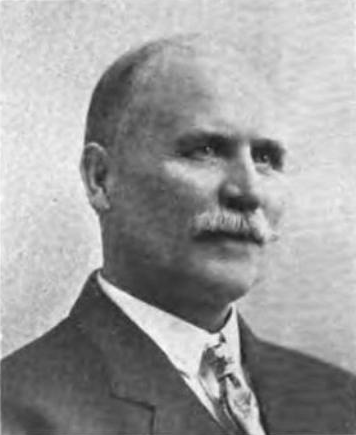

Member of Provincial Parliament
- In office November 18, 1914 – September 23, 1919
- Constituency: Hamilton West

Mayor of Hamilton, Ontario
- In office 1913–1914

Personal details
- Born: May 22, 1856; Guelph, Canada West
- Died: July 31, 1922 (aged 66); Hamilton, Ontario
- Political party: Conservative
- Spouse: Catherine Euler (m. 1881)
- Occupation: Politician

John Allan (May 22, 1856 – July 31, 1922) was a Canadian politician. Allan was the Member of Provincial Parliament for the seat of Hamilton West from 1914 to 1919.

== Biography ==
He was born in Guelph, Canada West, the son of James Allan, a Scottish immigrant. He apprenticed as a builder in Hamilton and worked in the western United States from 1874 to 1879, when he moved to New York City. In 1881, he married Catherine Euler. He retired from construction in 1906 and returned to Hamilton. He served on the city council and was mayor for two years. Allan was elected to the provincial assembly in a 1914 by-election held after John Strathearn Hendrie was named Lieutenant-Governor for Ontario.

He died in Hamilton on July 31, 1922.
