= Roy Adams (writer) =

American academic

Roy J. Adams is an American-Canadian academic, author, labour rights activist and poet.

Born in Philadelphia, Pennsylvania, he received his B.A. degree from Pennsylvania State University (summa cum laude) in 1967 and his Ph.D. degree in Industrial Relations from the University of Wisconsin in 1973. From then until 1997 he was a professor at McMaster University in Hamilton, Ontario, Canada and has also been a visiting professor at 14 other institutions in 11 countries. He has published widely on comparative industrial relations, labour policy. industrial relations theory and human rights in employment, especially on the topic of collective bargaining as a human right. He has given invited talks at over 140 institutions in 20 countries and has served on the editorial boards of twelve professional journals located in seven countries. He headed a Canadian federal government commission on training, educational leave and productivity, published a comparative industrial relations newsletter for 10 years, served as president of the Canadian Industrial Relations Association and was honored with that associations Gérard Dion Award for outstanding contributions to Canadian and international industrial relations.

After serving as Director of McMaster's Theme School on International Justice and Human Rights in 1996-1997, he founded the Society for the Promotion of Human Rights in Employment and became very active promoting human rights and especially the rights to organize and bargain collectively. From 2003 to 2015 the Supreme Court of Canada "constitutionalized" those rights and in doing so extensively cited Adams's work. For his human rights scholarship and activism, he was appointed Ariel F. Sallows Chair of Human Rights on the Faculty of Law at the University of Saskatchewan for 2009-2010.

In 2015 Adams was named a Fellow of the U.S.-based Labor and Employment Relations Association for "contributions of unusual distinction to the field and profession." In 2016 he initiated the Canadian Freedom of Association Award, to be granted annually to a person or organization for promoting knowledge and compliance with international standards regarding the rights to organize and bargain collectively.

In addition to his research and activism in labour and human rights, Adams was a candidate for a seat in the Ontario legislature, served as Executive Director of the Hamilton Civic Coalition, and was a columnist for the Hamilton Spectator, Straight Goods and International Union Rights. He is also a scuba diver, parachutist, mountaineer, amateur magician, memoirist and holds a black belt in Tae Kwan Do.

Roy J. Adams is also a poet with work published in literary magazines in Canada, the U.S.A., the U.K., Singapore and Australia. He is the author of a poetry chapbook and a full book of poetry, both of which are listed below. In 2019, Adams became a full member of the League of Canadian Poets.

Because of his penchant for venturing to dangerous parts of the world, his family nicknamed him "Indiana Dad."

== Books ==
- Adams, Roy J. Critical Mass, a book of poetry / by Roy J. Adams—Silver Bow publishing, 2019, 64pp. ISBN 978-1-77403-015-8
- Adams, Roy J. Bebop From Beau's Caboose, a poetry chapbook / by Roy J. Adams—The Ontario Poetry Society, 2018, 24pp.
- Adams, Roy J. Labour left out : Canada's failure to protect and promote collective bargaining as a human right / by Roy J. Adams. -- Ottawa : Canadian Centre for Policy Alternatives, [2006]. 152 p.; 22 cm. ISBN 0-88627-469-9
- Adams, Roy J. Good job, bad jobs, no jobs : tough choices for Canadian labor law / Roy J. Adams, Gordon Betcherman, Beth Bilson; with comments by Roger Phillips and John O'Grady. -- Toronto : C.D. Howe Institute, 1995. vii, 198 p. : ill.; 23 cm. ISBN 0-88806-352-0
- Adams, Roy J. The growth of white-collar unionism in Britain and Sweden : a comparative investigation / Roy J. Adams. -- Madison : Industrial Relations Research Institute, University of Wisconsin–Madison, 1975.
- Adams, Roy J. Towards a more competent labour force : a training levy scheme for Canada / by Roy J. Adams. -- Hamilton, Ont. : Faculty of Business, McMaster University, 1979.
- Adams, Roy J. Dunlop after two decades : systems theory as a framework for organizing the field of industrial relations / by Roy J. Adams. -- Hamilton, Ont. : Faculty of Business, McMaster University, 1977.
- Adams, Roy J. Two policy approaches to labour-management decision-making at the level of the enterprise : a comparison of the Wagner model and statutory works councils / by R.J. Adams. -- Hamilton, Ont. : Faculty of Business, McMaster University, 1984.
- Adams, Roy J. Employment standards as industrial relations sub-system : the Ontario case / by Roy J. Adams. -- Hamilton, Ont. : Faculty of Business, McMaster University, 1986.
- Adams, Roy J. The role of management in a political conception of the employment relationship / by Roy J. Adams. -- Hamilton, Ont. : Faculty of Business, McMaster University, 1986.
- Adams, Roy J. Labour-management dispute resolution in Canadian heavy industry : the Hilton Works case / by Roy J. Adams and Isik Zeytinoglu. -- Hamilton, Ont. : Faculty of Business, McMaster University, [1986].
- Comparative industrial relations : contemporary research and theory / edited by Roy J. Adams. -- London : HarperCollinsAcademic, 1991.
- Industrial relations theory : its nature, scope, and pedagogy / edited by Roy J. Adams and Noah M. Meltz. -- Metuchen, N.J. : IMLR Press/Rutgers University, 1993.
- Adams, Roy J. Industrial relations under liberal democracy : North America in comparative perspective / Roy J. Adams. -- Columbia, S.C. : University of South Carolina Press, c1995. xi, 219 p.; 24 cm. ISBN 1-57003-019-7
