= David Christopherson =

Canadian politician

The Honourable David Christopherson ECO
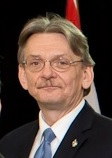

Member of Parliament for Hamilton Centre
- In office June 28, 2004 – September 11, 2019
- Preceded by: Riding Established
- Succeeded by: Matthew Green

Deputy Leader of the New Democratic Party
- In office April 19, 2012 – March 11, 2019 Serving with Libby Davies and Megan Leslie from 2012 to 2015
- Leader: Thomas Mulcair; Jagmeet Singh
- Preceded by: Libby Davies; Thomas Mulcair
- Succeeded by: Alexandre Boulerice; Sheri Benson

Member of the Ontario Provincial Parliament for Hamilton West
- In office May 5, 1999 – September 2, 2003
- Preceded by: Lillian Ross
- Succeeded by: Judy Marsales

Member of the Ontario Provincial Parliament for Hamilton Centre
- In office September 6, 1990 – May 5, 1999
- Preceded by: Lily Oddie
- Succeeded by: Riding Abolished

Hamilton City Councillor
- In office December 1, 1985 – September 6, 1990 Serving with Geraldine Copps
- Preceded by: Don Gray and Vince Scott
- Succeeded by: Geraldine Copps and Dave Wilson
- Constituency: Ward Four

More...

Chair of the Standing Committee on Public Accounts
- In office June 15, 2011 – August 2, 2015
- Minister: Tony Clement
- Preceded by: Joe Volpe
- Succeeded by: Kevin Sorenson

Personal details
- Born: October 5, 1954 (age 71) Hamilton, Ontario, Canada
- Party: New Democratic Party
- Spouse: Denise Christopherson (née Doyle)
- Profession: director, political assistant, union officer

David Christopherson (born October 5, 1954) is a Canadian politician. From 2004 until 2019, he represented the riding of Hamilton Centre in the House of Commons of Canada. He previously served in the Legislative Assembly of Ontario from 1990 to 2003, and was a cabinet minister in the provincial government of Bob Rae. Christopherson is a member of the New Democratic Party.

== Early life and career ==
Christopherson was born in Hamilton, Ontario. He is self-educated, having dropped out of high school in the ninth grade. A voracious reader, he is a particular fan of books on politics. He began working with International Harvester in Hamilton at age 19, and remained with the company for eleven years. He was active with the United Auto Workers union, becoming plant chairman in 1978 and president of the Local 525 in 1979.

Christopherson campaigned in Hamilton East in the 1984 federal election, finishing second against Liberal candidate Sheila Copps. He was elected to Hamilton, Ontario City Council the following year for the city's fourth ward, and re-elected in 1988. Christopherson became chairman of Hamilton's licensing committee, and made a concerted effort to reform the city's notorious regulatory practices. He developed a reputation on as a hard worker, and was one of three councillors to decline a pay increase in 1988.

Christopherson was also a constituency assistant for NDP Member of Parliament (MP) Ian Deans in the mid-1980s. He sought the NDP nomination for Hamilton Mountain after Deans's retirement in 1986, but lost to Marion Dewar.

== Provincial politics ==
=== Government backbencher ===
Christopherson was elected to the Ontario legislature in the 1990 provincial election, defeating Liberal cabinet minister Lily Oddie Munro in Hamilton Centre as the NDP won a majority government across the province. He was chair of caucus and parliamentary assistant to Provincial Treasurer Floyd Laughren from 1990 to 1992.

=== Cabinet minister ===
Christopherson was respected by all parties for his legislative work ethic and contributions to the Standing Committee on Finance and Economic Affairs, and was widely considered as one of the most skilled backbenchers in the government caucus. There was little surprise when he was appointed to cabinet as Minister of Correctional Services on September 23, 1992, notwithstanding that Hamilton already had three representatives in cabinet.

Christopherson's portfolio was extremely challenging, and was described by one journalist as "one of the worst jobs in government". The Correctional Services ministry had previously been damaged by reports of sexual abuse and intimidation involving staff at Ontario jails and training centres, and Christopherson was required to enact substantial internal reforms. He supported former NDP leader Stephen Lewis's recommendations on race relations in the criminal justice system, and made efforts to address racism in Ontario prisons.

On February 3, 1993, Christopherson was given additional cabinet responsibilities as Solicitor General of Ontario. This was also a difficult portfolio, and Christopherson has since acknowledged that relations between the Rae government and Ontario police services were extremely tense when he entered the ministry. He has been credited with improving this situation, winning the respect of many in the police community. Julian Fantino, then an executive member of the Ontario Association of Chiefs of Police, commented that there was "marked improvement" in relations following Christopherson's appointment.

Christopherson allowed semi-automatic weapons to be issued to officers in late 1993. This was supported by many in the police service, but was criticized by some in the legal community on the grounds that the new weapons were not safer than the .38 models they replaced. Christopherson also introduced new guidelines for targeting hate crimes, and mandated stricter standards for police investigations of spousal assault. Early in 1995, he announced that police would soon be given the right to warn the general public about sex offenders released into residential neighbourhoods.

In May 1994, Christopherson introduced a pilot project to reduce illegal gun ownership in Ontario. For a three-month period, Ontarians were permitted to turn over illegal or unwanted firearms to the police without risking prosecution for illegal possession. The policy was endorsed by the police community. After three months, the ministry announced that 1,000 pistols and revolvers, 2,000 rifles and shotguns and over 150,000 rounds of ammunition had been turned over to the police.

In addition to his official cabinet portfolios, Christopherson was also responsible for articulating the Rae government's strategy for the proposed Red Hill Creek Expressway in Hamilton. Although he had previously opposed the project for environmental and other reasons, Christopherson argued in 1994 that a scaled-back four-lane highway would be the "best possible compromise" under the circumstances. The Rae government approved the plan, although it was later rejected by the succeeding ministry.

Christopherson was widely respected for his abilities in cabinet, and often won praise from members of the opposition. Progressive Conservative Bob Runciman credited him for his competence and managerial skills, while Liberal Tim Murphy described him as "the best of a bad bunch". He served until the defeat of the Rae government in 1995.

=== Opposition member ===
The Rae government was defeated in the 1995 election, falling to only seventeen seats out of 130. Christopherson, still personally popular, was narrowly re-elected for Hamilton Centre. He served in the next legislature as NDP critic for labour issues and the Workers' Compensation Board.

Rae resigned as party leader in 1996, and there was considerable media speculation that Christopherson would run to succeed him. Toronto Star journalist Thomas Walkom indicated that he would be a powerful candidate on the centrist wing of the party, and would likely win the support of pro-Rae trade unions such as the Steelworkers. He decided against running and gave his support to Howard Hampton, the eventual winner.

Christopherson was a prominent supporter of Hamilton's amalgamation with neighbouring municipalities in the late 1990s. The policy, which was supported by some members of all three major parties, was enacted by the Progressive Conservative government of Mike Harris in 2000. Christopherson considered leaving politics to run for the leadership of the Ontario Federation of Labour in 1997, but ultimately declined.

The Hamilton Centre riding was eliminated by redistribution in 1996, and Christopherson chose to contest the expanded riding of Hamilton West for the 1999 provincial election against incumbent Progressive Conservative Lillian Ross. He was re-elected, and became one of only nine New Democrats returned to the reduced 103-seat legislature. He served as his party's Finance and Labour Critic, and was appointed as House Leader. He considered campaigning for Mayor of Hamilton in 2000, but reluctantly declined.

Christopherson resigned as NDP House Leader in 2001, amid rumours of a rift with Hampton. He continued to serve as his party's critic for Consumer and Business Services and the Management Board of Cabinet, and was a deputy speaker in the legislature from 2001 to 2003.

== Mayoral campaign ==
Christopherson did not seek re-election to the legislature in 2003. He instead campaigned for mayor of Hamilton in that year's municipal campaign. He promised to reform the city's disclosure laws, requiring municipal politicians to declare their assets, debts and holdings. He also spoke out against plans to build an incinerator in the city for waste disposal. He was supported by two teachers' unions and the city firefighters' union, as well as by Liberal MPP Dominic Agostino from Hamilton East. Initially considered the frontrunner, he was ultimately defeated by rival candidate Larry Di Ianni. Hamilton's amalgamation with the more right-leaning suburbs was a factor, as was Christopherson's opposition to a revised Red Hill Expressway.

== Federal politician ==
Christopherson returned to political life a few months later, defeating Liberal cabinet minister Stan Keyes to win the Hamilton Centre riding in the 2004 federal election. The Liberal Party won a minority government, and Christopherson served as NDP critic for cities, community infrastructure, labour and steel policy in the 38th parliament. He was part of a Canadian delegation that observed presidential elections in Ukraine in late 2004.

He was re-elected in the 2006 federal election with an increased majority, as the Conservatives won a minority government nationally. In May 2006, he called for the Royal Canadian Mounted Police rather than the government to investigate a leak of the Auditor General's report into the Canadian gun registry. Christopherson suspected that someone connected to the government may have been responsible for the leak, given its "self-serving" nature. He has also criticized the previous Liberal government for allowing billions in unpaid tax monies to remain uncollected.

Christopherson was re-elected to his federal seat again in the 2008 federal election, and the 2011 federal election.

Christopherson is often described as a pragmatic politician. He once said that he has never been a "hard-line ideologue", but "the NDP is where I'm most comfortable."

He was appointed Defence Critic for the NDP after Jack Layton's death, and appointed one of the three deputy leaders, by Layton's successor Thomas Mulcair.

After the 2015 federal election, Christopherson was appointed as the NDP's critic for the Planning and Priorities Committee and for Public Safety and Emergency Preparedness.

Christopherson was involved in the so-called 'Elbowgate' political confrontation on 18 May 2016. Video of the floor of the House of Commons appears to show the MP moving from side to side impeding the path of Conservative whip, Gord Brown MP.

== Planned retirement ==
On July 5, 2018, Christopherson announced his plan to retire at the end of the 42nd Canadian Parliament, and to not seek re-election in the 2019 federal election.

"It has been my distinct honour to have served as the councillor for Ward 4, the Member of Provincial Parliament for Hamilton Centre and now as the federal Member of Parliament for Hamilton Centre," Christopherson wrote in his statement. "I truly love our city and the people who call it home. To have earned the trust and confidence of the people of Hamilton for so many years is truly humbling and I am grateful to have had the opportunity to join with so many dedicated people working to help build a stronger, more fair and diverse community."

== Electoral record ==
2015 Canadian federal election: Hamilton Centre
Party	Candidate	Votes	%	±%	Expenditures
New Democratic	David Christopherson	18,719	45.6	-11.4	–
Liberal	Anne Tennier	13,718	33.4	+19.3	–
Conservative	Yonatan Rozenszajn	6,018	11.8	-8.86	–
Green	Ute Schmid-Jones	1,778	4.3	+4.6	–
Marijuana	Michael James Baldasaro	348	0.8	–	–
Libertarian	Rob Young	316	0.8	–	–
Independent	Maria Anastasiou	186	0.5	–	–
Total valid votes/expense limit		41,083	100.0		$201,952.89
Total rejected ballots		269	0.6	-0.2	
Turnout		41,343	60.72	+5.57	
Eligible voters		68,087			
New Democratic hold		Swing		-17.5	
Source: Elections Canada

2011 Canadian federal election: Hamilton Centre
Party	Candidate	Votes	%	±%	Expenditures
New Democratic	David Christopherson	23,849	57.0	+7.7	–
Conservative	James Byron	11,020	26.4	+4.1	–
Liberal	Anne Tennier	5,912	14.1	-3.5	–
Marijuana	Michael Baldasaro	780	1.9	n/a	–
Marxist–Leninist	Lisa Nussey	252	0.6	+0.3	–
Total valid votes		41,813	100.0	–	
Total rejected ballots		320	0.8	–	
Turnout		42,133	54.7	–	
Eligible voters		77,077	–		

2008 Canadian federal election
Party	Candidate	Votes	%	±%
New Democratic	David Christopherson	20,010	49.3%	-1.99
Conservative	Leon O'Connor	9,051	22.3%	+2.01
Liberal	Helen Wilson	7,164	17.6%	-5.89
Green	John Livingstone	3,625	8.9%	+4.67
Libertarian	Anthony Giles	528	1.3%	
Marxist–Leninist	Lisa Nussey	126	0.3%	
Communist	Ryan Sparrow	125	0.3%	
Total valid votes		40,629	100.0%	
Total rejected ballots		247	0.6%	
Turnout		40,876	50.9%	-14.9%

2006 Canadian federal election: Hamilton Centre
Party	Candidate	Votes	%	Expenditures
New Democratic	David Christopherson	24,503	51.29	$79,917.66
Liberal	Javid Mirza	11,224	23.49	$71,436.13
Conservative	Eliot Lewis Hill	9,696	20.29	
Green	John Livingstone	2,022	4.23	$1,353.15
Canadian Action	Tony Des Lauriers	332	0.69	
Total valid votes		47,777	100.00	
Total rejected ballots		279		
Turnout		48,056	59.21	
Electors on the lists		81,161		
Sources: Official Results, Elections Canada and Financial Returns, Elections Canada.

2004 Canadian federal election: Hamilton Centre
Party	Candidate	Votes	%	Expenditures
New Democratic	David Christopherson	20,321	45.81	$72,723.37
Liberal	Stan Keyes	14,948	33.70	$71,403.14
Conservative	Leon Patrick O'Connor	6,714	15.13	$25,596.37
Green	Anne Marie Pavlov	1,422	3.21	$1,174.56
Christian Heritage	Stephen Downey	520	1.17	$1,581.38
Independent	Michael James Baldasaro	345	0.78	$413.20
Marxist–Leninist	Jamilé Ghaddar	91	0.21	$10.00
Total valid votes		44,361	100.00	
Total rejected ballots		328		
Turnout		44,689	55.32	
Turnout		80,778		
Percentage change figures are factored for redistribution. Conservative Party percentages are contrasted with the combined Canadian Alliance and Progressive Conservative percentages from 2000.
Sources: Official Results, Elections Canada and Financial Returns, Elections Canada.

Candidates for the November 10, 2003 Hamilton, Ontario Mayoral Election
Candidate	Popular vote		
Candidate	Votes	%	±%
Larry DiIanni	70,539	50.92%	-
David Christopherson	54,298	39.20%	-
Dick Wildeman	4,462	3.22%	-
Michael Peters	3,270	2.36%	-
Tom Murray	2,881	2.08%	-
Michael Baldasaro	2,569	1.85%	+0.75%
Matt Jelly	510	0.37%	-
Total votes	139,902	37.97%	
Registered voters	368,480	100%	
Note: All Hamilton Municipal Elections are officially non-partisan. Note: Candidate campaign colours are based on the prominent colour used in campaign items (signs, literature, etc.) and are used as a visual differentiation between candidates.

1999 Ontario general election: Hamilton West
Party	Candidate	Votes	%	Expenditures
New Democratic	David Christopherson	15,625	37.84	$63,891.36
Progressive Conservative	Lillian Ross	12,261	29.70	$58,588.68
Liberal	Frank D'Amico	12,037	29.15	$48,994.28
Green	Phyllis McColl	495	1.20	$6,090.89
Family Coalition	Lynne Scime	403	0.98	$1,100.80
Marxist–Leninist	Wendell Fields	236	0.57	$0.00
Natural Law	Rita Rassenberg	231	0.56	$0.00
Total valid votes		41,288	100.00	
Total rejected, unmarked and declined ballots		549		
Turnout		41,837	57.87	
Electors on the lists		72,295		

1995 Ontario general election: Hamilton Centre
Party	Candidate	Votes	%	±%	Expenditures
New Democratic	David Christopherson	8,012	36.81	-18.49	$40,543.33
Liberal	Filomena Tassi	7,322	33.64	+2.84	$34,483.85
Progressive Conservative	Angie Tomasic	5,723	26.29	+17.99	$18,222.88
Family Coalition	Tom Wigglesworth	376	1.72	+0.32	$1,548.28
Natural Law	Monique Poudrette	331	1.53	–	$0.00
Total valid votes		21,764	100.0		–
Total rejected ballots		372	1.68	-0.04	
Turnout		22,136	54.71	-5.07	
Eligible voters		40,459			
New Democratic hold		Swing		-10.66	

1990 Ontario general election: Hamilton Centre
Party	Candidate	Votes	%
New Democratic	David Christopherson	14,029	55.32
Liberal	Lily Oddie Munro	7,814	30.81
Progressive Conservative	Graham Snelgrove	2,116	8.34
Green	Brent Monkley	605	2.39
Libertarian	Julien Frost	429	1.69
Family Coalition	Jewell Wolgram	365	1.44
Total valid votes		25,358	100.00
Total rejected, unmarked and declined ballots		446	
Turnout		25,804	59.78
Electors on the lists		43,166	

Summary of the November 14, 1988 Hamilton, Ontario Ward Four Alderman Election
Candidate	Popular vote		
Candidate	Votes	%	±%
Geraldine Copps (incumbent)	8,174	69.38%	n/a
David Christopherson (incumbent)	8,055	68.38%	n/a
Bob Fanjoy	2,319	19.67%	n/a
Total votes	11,787	Note 1	
Registered voters	28,764	40.90%	n/a
Note 1: Each ward elected two aldermen and percentages are specific to each candidate, not for the overall total. Note 2: All Hamilton Municipal Elections are officially non-partisan. Note 3: Candidate campaign colours are based on the prominent colour used in campaign items (signs, literature, etc.) and are used as a visual differentiation between candidates.
Sources: Benedetti, Paul. "Clean campaign for a dirty job in Ward 4", The Hamilton Spectator, November 15, 1988, Metro, B2.

Summary of the November 12, 1985 Hamilton, Ontario Ward Four Alderman Election
Candidate	Popular vote		Elected?
Candidate	Votes	%	Elected?
Geraldine Copps	5,992	48.33%	
David Christopherson	4,958	40%	
Don Gray (incumbent)	3,069	24.75%	
Vince Scott (incumbent)	2,883	23.25%	
John Ellis	2,373	19.14%	
Gaspare Bonomo	878	7.08%	
Larry Wheaton	535	4.32%	
Bob Fanjoy	289	2.33%	
Total votes	12,398		
Registered voters			
Note 1: Each ward elected two aldermen and percentages are specific to each candidate, not for the overall total. Note 2: All Hamilton Municipal Elections are officially non-partisan. Note 3: Candidate campaign colours are based on the prominent colour used in campaign items (signs, literature, etc.) and are used as a visual differentiation between candidates.
Sources: Wilson, Paul. "That old Copps magic still works", Hamilton Spectator, November 13, 1985, A7.

1984 Canadian federal election: Hamilton East
Party	Candidate	Votes	%	±%
Liberal	Sheila Copps	14,533	37.88	
New Democratic	David Christopherson	11,872	30.95	
Progressive Conservative	Jack MacDonald	11,711	30.53	
Social Credit	Vince G. Vostrez	102	0.27	
Communist	Elizabeth Rowley	87	0.23	
Commonwealth of Canada	Ken Perry	59	0.15	
Total valid votes		38,364	100.00	
Total rejected ballots		348		
Turnout		38,712	74.87	
Electors on the lists		51,705		

All federal election information is taken from Elections Canada. All provincial election information is taken from Elections Ontario. The 2003 municipal election results are taken from official results provided by the City of Hamilton, available here. Italicized expenditures refer to submitted totals, and are presented when the final reviewed totals are not available.

The 1999 provincial expenditure entries are taken from official candidate reports as listed by Elections Ontario. The figures cited are the Total Candidate's Campaign Expenses Subject to Limitation, and include transfers from constituency associations.

Rae ministry, Province of Ontario (1990–1995)
Cabinet posts (2)
Predecessor	Office	Successor
Allan Pilkey	Solicitor-General; 1993–1995	Bob Runciman
Allan Pilkey	Minister of Correctional Services; 1992–1995	Bob Runciman
