= Hamilton Centre (federal electoral district) =

Federal electoral district in Ontario, Canada

Coordinates: 43.250°N 79.854°W

Ontario electoral district
- Interactive map of riding boundaries from the 2025 federal election

Federal electoral district
- Legislature: House of Commons
MP
Aslam Rana
Liberal
- District created: 2003
- First contested: 2004
- Last contested: 2021
- District webpage: profile, map

Demographics
- Population (2021): 106,439
- Electors (2021): 74,721
- Area (km²): 32
- Pop. density (per km²): 3,326.2
- Census division: Hamilton
- Census subdivision: Hamilton (part)

Hamilton Centre (French: Hamilton-Centre) is a federal electoral district in Hamilton, Ontario, Canada, that has been represented in the House of Commons of Canada since 2004.

== History ==
It was created in 2003 from parts of Hamilton East, Hamilton West and Ancaster—Dundas—Flamborough—Aldershot ridings. This riding lost territory to Hamilton West—Ancaster—Dundas and gained territory from Hamilton East—Stoney Creek during the 2012 electoral redistribution.

Following the 2022 Canadian federal electoral redistribution, the riding gained the remainder of the Strathcona neighbourhood from Hamilton West—Ancaster—Dundas, albeit an uninhabited portion consisting of Woodland Cemetery. It additionally gained the Homeside, Normanhurst, Bartonville, Hamilton, Glenview, and Rosedale neighbourhoods from Hamilton East—Stoney Creek. These changes came into effect upon the calling of the 2025 Canadian federal election.

== Geography ==
Following the 2012 electoral boundary redistribution, the boundaries of Hamilton Centre were significantly adjusted, with the portions of the electoral district that were above the Niagara Escarpment moving to the new district of Hamilton West—Ancaster—Dundas.

Following the 2022 electoral boundary redistribution, Hamilton Centre's borders were expanded to include the uninhabited portion of Woodlawn Cemetery previously held by Hamilton West—Ancaster—Dundas and five neighbourhoods - Homeside, Normanhurst, Bartonville, Glenview West, and Rosedale - that were previously part of Hamilton East—Stoney Creek.

== Demographics ==
According to the 2021 Canadian census

Languages: 77.2% English, 2.2% Spanish, 2.1% French, 2.1% Portuguese, 2.0% Arabic, 1.1% Vietnamese, 1.0% Italian
Religions: 43.9% Christian (21.8% Catholic, 3.4% Anglican, 2.1% United Church, 1.4% Christian Orthodox, 1.4% Presbyterian, 1.2% Baptist, 1.0% Pentecostal, 11.5% other Christian), 6.2% Muslim, 2.0% Hindu, 1.5% Buddhist, 44.2% none
Median income: $35,200 (2020)
Average income: $44,560 (2020)

Panethnic groups in Hamilton Centre (2011−2021)
Panethnic group	2021		2016		2011	
Panethnic group	Pop.	%	Pop.	%	Pop.	%
European (Note: Statistic includes all persons that did not make up part of a visible minority or an indigenous identity.)	72,070	69.48%	71,730	73.82%	75,985	77.65%
African	8,380	8.08%	6,390	6.58%	4,935	5.04%
Southeast Asian (Note: Statistic includes total responses of "Filipino" and "Southeast Asian" under visible minority section on census.)	4,585	4.42%	3,675	3.78%	3,955	4.04%
South Asian	4,420	4.26%	2,600	2.68%	1,985	2.03%
Indigenous	4,280	4.13%	4,140	4.26%	4,030	4.12%
East Asian (Note: Statistic includes total responses of "Chinese", "Korean", and "Japanese" under visible minority section on census.)	2,915	2.81%	2,880	2.96%	2,935	3%
Middle Eastern (Note: Statistic includes total responses of "West Asian" and "Arab" under visible minority section on census.)	2,810	2.71%	2,260	2.33%	1,280	1.31%
Latin American	2,440	2.35%	2,105	2.17%	2,050	2.09%
Other/multiracial (Note: Statistic includes total responses of "Visible minority, n.i.e." and "Multiple visible minorities" under visible minority section on census.)	1,820	1.75%	1,380	1.42%	705	0.72%
Total responses	103,725	97.45%	97,165	97.07%	97,860	96.01%
Total population	106,439	100%	100,103	100%	101,932	100%
Notes: Totals greater than 100% due to multiple origin responses. Demographics based on 2012 Canadian federal electoral redistribution riding boundaries.

== Members of Parliament ==
Hamilton Centre is represented in the House of Commons of Canada by Aslam Rana of the Liberal Party of Canada. Rana was elected in the 2025 federal election. Prior to Rana's election, the riding was considered an NDP "stronghold".

Parliament	Years	Member	Party
Hamilton Centre; Riding created from Hamilton East, Hamilton West and Ancaster—Dundas—Flamborough—Aldershot
38th	2004–2006	David Christopherson	New Democratic
39th	2006–2008	David Christopherson	New Democratic
40th	2008–2011	David Christopherson	New Democratic
41st	2011–2015	David Christopherson	New Democratic
42nd	2015–2019	David Christopherson	New Democratic
43rd	2019–2021	Matthew Green	New Democratic
44th	2021–2025	Matthew Green	New Democratic
45th	2025–present	Aslam Rana	Liberal

== Election results ==
View source data.
Graph of election results in Hamilton Centre (minor parties that never got 2% of the vote or didn't run consistently are omitted)

2025 Canadian federal election
Party	Candidate	Votes	%	±%	Expenditures
Liberal	Aslam Rana	21,388	37.55	+10.82	$88,993.76
Conservative	Hayden Lawrence	17,079	29.99	+13.47	$20,659.66
New Democratic	Matthew Green	16,581	29.11	–17.85	$118,359.33
Green	Sandy Crawley	818	1.44	–1.22	$0.00
People's	David Speicher	591	1.04	–5.53	$3,548.05
No affiliation	Carla Green	215	0.38	N/A	$40.38
Rhinoceros	Cody Chenier	190	0.33	N/A	$0.00
No affiliation	Michael Loomans	90	0.16	N/A	$0.00
Total valid votes/expense limit		56,952	99.16	—	$137,065.55
Total rejected ballots		480	0.84	—	
Turnout		57,432	62.91	+7.21	
Eligible voters		91,294			
Liberal notional gain from New Democratic		Swing		–1.26	
Source: Elections Canada

2021 federal election redistributed results
Party	Vote	%
New Democratic	23,390	46.96
Liberal	13,315	26.73
Conservative	8,227	16.52
People's	3,271	6.57
Green	1,325	2.66
Others	283	0.57

2021 Canadian federal election
Party	Candidate	Votes	%	±%	Expenditures
New Democratic	Matthew Green	20,105	48.70	+2.54	$59,357.46
Liberal	Margaret Bennett	10,941	26.50	-2.17	$33,346.62
Conservative	Fabian Grenning	6,209	15.04	+0.67	none listed
People's	Kevin Barber	2,637	6.39	+4.50	$0.00
Green	Avra Caroline Weinstein	1,105	2.68	-4.96	$3,627.12
Communist	Nigel Cheriyan	184	0.45	–	$0.00
Independent	Nathalie Xian Yi Yan	99	0.24	+0.05	$0.00
Total valid votes/expense limit		41,280	99.16	–	$120,288.26
Total rejected ballots		351	0.84	–	
Turnout		41,631	55.72	-3.36	
Eligible voters		74,721			
New Democratic hold		Swing		+2.35	
Source: Elections Canada

2019 Canadian federal election
Party	Candidate	Votes	%	±%	Expenditures
New Democratic	Matthew Green	20,368	46.16	+0.60	$71,015.33
Liberal	Jasper Kujavsky	12,651	28.67	-4.72	$79,469.65
Conservative	Monica Ciriello	6,341	14.37	-0.28	$13,186.90
Green	Jason Lopez	3,370	7.64	+3.31	none listed
People's	Melina Mamone	833	1.89	–	none listed
Christian Heritage	Gary Duyzer	182	0.41	–	none listed
Independent	Tony Lemma	158	0.36	–	$2,716.24
Independent	Edward Graydon	134	0.30	–	none listed
Independent	Nathalie Xian Yi Yan	85	0.19	–	none listed
Total valid votes/expense limit		44,122	99.09		
Total rejected ballots		405	0.91	+0.26	
Turnout		44,527	59.08	-0.34	
Eligible voters		75,371			
New Democratic hold		Swing		+2.66	
Source: Elections Canada

2015 Canadian federal election
Party	Candidate	Votes	%	±%	Expenditures
New Democratic	David Christopherson	18,719	45.56	-14.69	$52,665.42
Liberal	Anne Tennier	13,718	33.39	+20.29	$65,231.14
Conservative	Yonatan Rozenszajn	6,018	14.65	-8.81	$38,675.56
Green	Ute Schmid-Jones	1,778	4.33	+3.83	$5,331.63
Marijuana	Michael James Baldasaro	348	0.85	–	–
Libertarian	Rob Young	316	0.77	–	$4,236.22
Independent	Maria Anastasiou	186	0.45	–	$829.76
Total valid votes/expense limit		41,083	99.35		$201,952.89
Total rejected ballots		269	0.65		
Turnout		41,352	59.42		
Eligible voters		69,598			
New Democratic hold		Swing		-17.49	
Source: Elections Canada

2011 federal election redistributed results
Party	Vote	%
New Democratic	20,741	60.25
Conservative	8,076	23.46
Liberal	4,509	13.10
Others	925	2.69
Green	172	0.50

2011 Canadian federal election
Party	Candidate	Votes	%	±%	Expenditures
New Democratic	David Christopherson	23,849	57.0	+7.7	–
Conservative	James Byron	11,020	26.4	+4.1	–
Liberal	Anne Tennier	5,912	14.1	-3.5	–
Marijuana	Michael Baldasaro	780	1.9	n/a	–
Marxist–Leninist	Lisa Nussey	252	0.6	+0.3	–
Total valid votes		41,813	100.0	–	
Total rejected ballots		320	0.8	–	
Turnout		42,133	54.7	–	
Eligible voters		77,077	–		

2008 Canadian federal election
Party	Candidate	Votes	%	±%	Expenditures
New Democratic	David Christopherson	20,010	49.3	-2.0	$66,259
Conservative	Leon O'Connor	9,051	22.3	+2.0	$24,629
Liberal	Helen Wilson	7,164	17.6	-5.9	$30,226
Green	John Livingstone	3,625	8.9	+4.2	$5,353
Libertarian	Anthony Giles	528	1.3	n/a	–
Marxist–Leninist	Lisa Nussey	126	0.3	n/a	
Communist	Ryan Sparrow	125	0.3	n/a	$373
Total valid votes/expense limit		39,850	100.0	$85,900	

2006 Canadian federal election
Party	Candidate	Votes	%	±%
New Democratic	David Christopherson	24,503	51.3	+5.5
Liberal	Javid Mirza	11,224	23.5	-10.2
Conservative	Elliot L. Hill	9,969	20.3	+5.7
Green	John Livingstone	2,022	4.2	+1.0
Canadian Action	Tony Des Lauriers	332	0.7	n/a
Total valid votes		47,777	100.0	
Total rejected ballots		279		
Turnout		48,056	59.2	

2004 Canadian federal election
Party	Candidate	Votes	%
New Democratic	David Christopherson	20,321	45.8
Liberal	Stan Keyes	14,948	33.7
Conservative	Leon O'Connor	6,714	15.1
Green	Anne Marie Pavlov	1,422	3.2
Christian Heritage	Stephen Downey	520	1.2
Independent	Michael James Baldasaro	345	0.8
Marxist–Leninist	Jamile Ghaddar	91	0.2
Total valid votes		44,361	100.0

== See also ==
- List of Canadian electoral districts
- Historical federal electoral districts of Canada
