= 2003 St. Catharines municipal election =

← 2000	November 10, 2003	2006 →
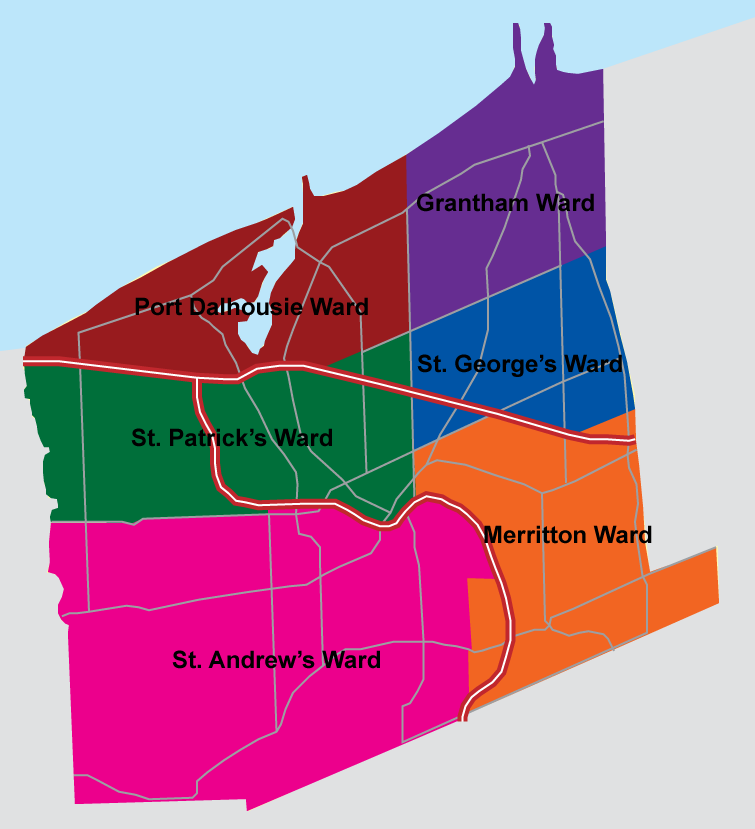
- The Ward boundaries for the 2003 Election. The Mayor and regional councillors are elected across the city, Councillors in their respective wards.
Mayor before election
Tim Rigby
Elected mayor
Tim Rigby

The St. Catharines municipal election of 2003 was held on 10 November 2003 to determine a mayor, regional and city councillors and school trustees in the city of St. Catharines, Ontario.

Report
Eligible Voters	102190
Ballots Cast	30427
Turnout	29.77%

== Mayoral results ==
2003 St. Catharines municipal election: Mayor
Candidate	Votes	%
(x)Tim Rigby	9,558	31.81
Wendy Patriquin	9,504	31.63
Rondi Craig	9,189	30.59
Mark Klimchuk	1,166	3.88
Burt Koiter	415	1.38
Boris Petrovici	212	0.71
Total valid votes	30,044	100.00

== Niagara Regional Council ==
2003 St. Catharines municipal election: Niagara Regional Councillor (six elected)
Candidate	Votes	%
Judy Casselman	13,666	10.54
Ronna Katzman	13,096	10.09
(x) Bruce Timms	11,456	8.83
(x) Peter Partington	11,340	8.74
Brian Heit	11,085	8.54
(x) Michael R. Collins	10,926	8.42
Jamie Almas	10,691	8.24
Brian McMullan	10,045	7.74
Bob Kennedy	9,956	7.67
Christel Haeck	8,000	6.17
Ted Mouradian	6,128	4.72
Ara Torigian	4,941	3.81
Bill LeFeuvre	4,591	3.54
Salvatore Sorrento	3,815	2.94
Total valid votes	129,738	100.00

Electors could vote for six candidates.
Percentages are determined in relation to the total number of votes.

== St. Catharines City Council ==
=== Ward 1 - Merriton ===
Candidate	Total votes	% of total votes
SHEILA MORRA	1615	21.12%
JENNIE STEVENS	1528	19.98%
MIKE O'LEARY	1326	17.34%
JOHN ANDERSON	830	10.85%
JACK WALLACE	533	6.97%
MATTHEW BELL	523	6.84%
ROBBIE CRAINE	410	5.36%
GEORGE GOFF	371	4.85%
JIM FANNON	230	3.01%
JONATHON INKOL	159	2.08%
FELY ANTE WHITFIELD	123	1.61%

=== Ward 2 - St. Andrew's ===
Candidate	Total votes	% of total votes
(incumbent) JOSEPH KUSHNER	3270	37.98%
CAM DONEVAN	2303	26.75%
RUTH McMULLAN	1973	22.92%
WAYNE KRETZ	678	7.87%
RICK MARCANTONIO	386	4.48%

=== Ward 3 - St. George's ===
Candidate	Total votes	% of total votes
(incumbent) GREG WASHUTA	2804	42.10%
PETER SECORD	2440	36.63%
JERRY SHANAHAN	782	11.74%
VALOREE MACKONKA	635	9.53%

=== Ward 4 - St. Patrick's ===
Candidate	Total votes	% of total votes
(incumbent) CAROL DISHER	1715	22.83%
CHARLES K. GERVAIS	1530	20.37%
PAUL FERRACUTI	1274	16.96%
JIM MEYERS	1184	15.76%
SIMON CLERY	1031	13.73%
JEANNETTE TOSSOUNIAN	412	5.49%
ROBERT W. BATTER	365	4.86%

=== Ward 5 - Grantham ===
Candidate	Total votes	% of total votes
(incumbent) DAWN DODGE	1615	35.88%
BRIAN DORSEY	1528	30.53%
DAN ANTONIDES	1326	11.02%
TRACY M. COTTON	830	10.76%
TONY TULLO	533	6.52%
DOUG HAGAR	523	5.29%

=== Ward 6 - Port Dalhousie ===
Candidate	Total votes	% of total votes
(incumbent) BRUCE WILLIAMSON	1615	31.06%
(incumbent) SUE ERSKINE	1528	28.50%
NORM ST. GEORGE	1326	16.36%
DAN HILL	830	8.11%
JOHN BRANDS	533	6.94%
WILLIE WAKULICH	523	5.35%
JAMES A. HAND	410	3.68%
