= 2010 Niagara Region municipal elections =

Elections were held in the Niagara Region of Ontario on October 25, 2010 in conjunction with municipal elections across the province.

== Niagara Regional Council ==
| Position | Elected |
|---|---|
| Fort Erie Mayor | Douglas G. Martin |
| Fort Erie Councillor | John T. Teal |
| Grimsby Mayor | Bob M. Bentley |
| Grimsby Councillor | Debbie M. Zimmerman |
| Lincoln Mayor | Bill Hodgson |
| Lincoln Councillor | Mark Bylsma |
| Niagara Falls Mayor | Jim Diodati |
| Niagara Falls Councillor | Bart Maves |
| Niagara Falls Councillor | Barbara Greenwood |
| Niagara Falls Councillor | Selina Volpatti |
| Niagara-on-the-Lake Lord Mayor | Dave Eke |
| Niagara-on-the-Lake Councillor | Gary Burroughs |
| Pelham Mayor | Dave Augustyn |
| Pelham Councillor | Brian Baty |
| Port Colborne Mayor | Vance Badawey |
| Port Colborne Councillor | David Barrick |
| St. Catharines Mayor | Brian McMullan |
| St. Catharines Councillor | Douglas Bruce Timms |
| St. Catharines Councillor | Ronna Katzman |
| St. Catharines Councillor | Tim Rigby |
| St. Catharines Councillor | Brian Heit |
| St. Catharines Councillor | Alan Caslin |
| St. Catharines Councillor | Andy W. Petrowsky |
| Thorold Mayor | Ted Luciani |
| Thorold Councillor | Henry D'Angela |
| Wainfleet Mayor | April Jeffs |
| Welland Mayor | Barry Sharpe |
| Welland Councillor | Cindy Foster |
| Welland Councillor | George H. Marshall |
| West Lincoln Mayor | Douglas Joyner |

== Fort Erie ==
| Mayoral Candidate | Vote | % |
|---|---|---|
| Douglas G. Martin (X) | 4,836 | 50.03 |
| Ann-Marie Noyes | 4,831 | 49.97 |

== Grimsby ==
| Mayoral Candidate | Vote | % |
|---|---|---|
| Bob Bentley (X) | Acclaimed | |

== Lincoln ==
| Mayoral Candidate | Vote | % |
|---|---|---|
| Bill Hodgson (X) | 3,624 | 60.27 |
| Alvin Danyluck | 1,269 | 21.10 |
| Norm Groff | 1,120 | 18.63 |

== Niagara Falls ==
| Mayoral Candidate | Vote | % |
|---|---|---|
| Jim Diodati | 13,520 | 52.9 |
| Ted Salci (X) | 10,464 | 40.9 |
| Steve King | 1,594 | 6.2 |

== Niagara-on-the-Lake ==
| Lord Mayoral Candidate | Vote | % |
|---|---|---|
| Dave Eke | 2,310 | |
| Patrick Darte | 1,537 | |
| Thomas W. Braybrook | 1,328 | |
| Ray Guy | 915 | |

== Pelham ==
| Mayoral Candidate | Vote | % |
|---|---|---|
| Dave Augustyn (X) | 4,676 | |
| Sharon Cook | 1,266 | |

== Port Colborne ==
| Mayoral Candidate | Vote | % |
|---|---|---|
| Vance Badawey (X) | 4,800 | 61.58 |
| Frank DiBartolomeo | 2,995 | 38.42 |

== St. Catharines ==
2010 St. Catharines municipal election
- October 25, 2010
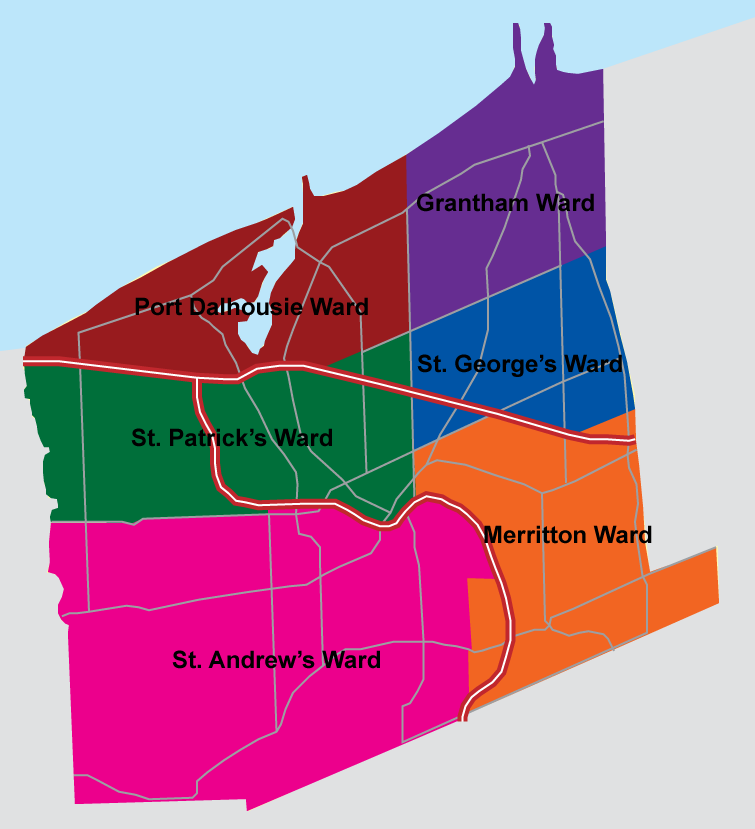
- The Ward boundaries for the 2010 Election. The Mayor and regional councillors are elected across the city, Councillors in their respective wards.
Mayor before election
Brian McMullan
Elected mayor
Brian McMullan

=== Mayor ===
| Candidate | Vote | % |
|---|---|---|
| Brian McMullan (i) | 22,015 | 78.65 |
| David D'Intino | 2,749 | 9.82 |
| Terry LeBlanc | 1,296 | 4.63 |
| Alexander Davidoff | 1,022 | 3.65 |
| John W. Beam | 908 | 3.24 |
| Total valid votes | 29,372 | 100.00 |

=== Niagara Regional Council (6 elected) ===
| Candidate | Total votes | % of total votes |
|---|---|---|
| Bruce Timms (i) | 12,625 | 10.82% |
| Ronna Katzman (i) | 12,098 | 10.37% |
| Tim Rigby (i) | 12,076 | 10.35% |
| Brian Heit (i) | 10,443 | 8.95% |
| Alan Caslin | 8,053 | 6.90% |
| Andrew Petrowski | 8,018 | 6.87% |
| Carlos Garcia (i) | 7,891 | 6.76% |
| Ted Mouradian | 7,585 | 6.50% |
| Kelly Edgar | 5,060 | 4.34% |
| Phil Porter | 5,048 | 4.33% |
| Patricia Lindal | 4,520 | 3.87% |
| Norm St. George | 4,240 | 3.63% |
| Michael O'Leary | 4,173 | 3.58% |
| Mike Coakley | 3,970 | 3.40% |
| Chris Clarke | 2,829 | 2.42% |
| Tom Ferguson | 2,735 | 2.34% |
| Mark Belchior | 2,041 | 1.75% |
| David Graham | 1,978 | 1.69% |
| Jon Radick | 1,318 | 1.13% |
| Total valid votes | 116,701 | 100.00 |

==== Incumbents not running for re-election ====
- Judy Casselman
- Peter Partington

=== St. Catharines City Council ===
2 candidates are elected in each ward.

==== Ward 1 - Merriton ====
| Candidate | Total votes | % of total vote |
|---|---|---|
| Jennie Stevens (i) | 2,294 | 32.96% |
| Jeff Burch (i) | 2,064 | 29.66% |
| David Haywood | 1,134 | 16.29% |
| Garry Robbins | 817 | 11.74% |
| Sam Sacco | 491 | 7.05% |
| Cameron Alderdice | 160 | 2.30% |
| Total valid votes | 6,960 | 100.00 |

==== Ward 2 - St. Andrew's ====
| Candidate | Total votes | % of total vote |
|---|---|---|
| Joseph Kushner (i) | 2,750 | 35.57% |
| Matthew Harris | 2,172 | 28.09% |
| Sean Polden | 1,940 | 25.09% |
| Patti Radick | 869 | 11.24% |
| Total valid votes | 7,731 | 100.00 |

==== Ward 3 - St. George's ====
| Candidate | Total votes | % of total vote |
|---|---|---|
| Greg Washuta (i) | 2,211 | 37.91% |
| Peter Secord (i) | 1,812 | 31.06% |
| Laura Ip | 1,021 | 17.50% |
| Dale Millar | 789 | 13.53% |
| Total valid votes | 5,833 | 100.00 |

==== Ward 4 - St. Patrick's ====
| Candidate | Total votes | % of total vote |
|---|---|---|
| Mark Elliott (i) | 2,128 | 32.27% |
| Mathew Siscoe | 1,913 | 29.01% |
| John Bacher | 1,372 | 20.81% |
| Scott Duff | 729 | 11.06% |
| Robert George | 452 | 6.85% |
| Total valid votes | 6,594 | 100.00 |

==== Ward 5 - Grantham ====
| Candidate | Total votes | % of total vote |
|---|---|---|
| Bill Phillips (i) | 2,946 | 28.65% |
| Dawn Dodge (i) | 2,296 | 22.33% |
| Brian Dorsey | 2,274 | 22.12% |
| Salvatore Sorrento | 1,287 | 12.52% |
| Alan Ziemianin | 805 | 7.83% |
| James Black | 674 | 6.56% |
| Total valid votes | 10,282 | 100.00 |

==== Ward 6 - Port Dalhousie ====
| Candidate | Total votes | % of total vote |
|---|---|---|
| Bruce Williamson (i) | 3,381 | 34.63% |
| Len Stack (i) | 2,285 | 23.40% |
| Marty Mako | 2,259 | 23.14% |
| Kelly George | 1,079 | 11.05% |
| Richard Naldjieff | 450 | 4.61% |
| Todd Melville | 309 | 3.17% |
| Total valid votes | 9,763 | 100.00 |

=== Niagara Catholic District School Board ===
==== Trustee, Ward 1 Thorold/Merritton ====
| Candidate | Votes | % of vote |
|---|---|---|
| Rhianon Burkholder | 1,513 | 52.28% |
| Leonard Ferry | 798 | 27.57% |
| Alex McKee | 583 | 20.15% |
| Total valid votes | 2,894 | 100.00 |

==== Trustee, Ward 2-6 (2 Elected) ====
| Candidate | Total votes | % of total vote |
|---|---|---|
| Maurice Charbonneau (i) | 3,265 | 32.86% |
| Kathy Burtnik (i) | 2,648 | 26.65% |
| Lorna Costantini | 1,271 | 12.79% |
| Jane Pillitteri | 1,223 | 12.31% |
| Dominic Diserafino | 947 | 9.53% |
| Mary-Jo Au | 581 | 5.85% |
| Total valid votes | 9,935 | 100.00 |

=== District School Board of Niagara (4 Elected) ===
| Candidate | Total votes | % of total votes |
|---|---|---|
| Lora Campbell (i) | 6,821 | 10.12% |
| Jonathan Fast | 6,618 | 9.82% |
| Dalton Clark (i) | 6,129 | 9.09% |
| Alex Bradnam | 6,011 | 8.92% |
| Lynn D. Campbell (i) | 5,953 | 8.83% |
| Linda Crouch | 5,729 | 8.50% |
| Henry Durksen | 5,193 | 7.71% |
| Paolo Miele | 5,139 | 7.63% |
| Kristine Akilie | 5,087 | 7.55% |
| John A. Pula | 4,790 | 7.11% |
| Barry Wilding | 3,688 | 5.47% |
| Don MacDougall | 3,629 | 5.38% |
| Elaine Manocha | 2,605 | 3.87% |
| Total valid votes | 67,392 | 100.00 |

== Thorold ==
| Mayoral Candidate | Vote | % |
|---|---|---|
| Ted Luciani | 2,049 | |
| Robert Gabriel | 2,045 | |
| Jim Handley | 1,399 | |

== Wainfleet ==
| Mayoral Candidate | Vote | % |
|---|---|---|
| April Jeffs | 1541 | 55.41 |
| Barbara Henderson (X) | 1240 | 44.59 |

== Welland ==
| Mayoral Candidate | Vote | % |
|---|---|---|
| Barry Sharpe | 5,001 | 31.56 |
| David Alexander | 4,459 | 28.14 |
| Greg D'Amico | 2,589 | 16.34 |
| Leo S. Van Vliet | 2,371 | 14.96 |
| Phil Bradley | 1,214 | 7.66 |
| John Watt | 211 | 1.33 |

== West Lincoln ==
| Mayoral Candidate | Vote | % |
|---|---|---|
| Douglas Joyner | 1,340 | |
| Paul Keizer | 1,271 | |
| Katie Trombetta (X) | 1,082 | |
| Cathy Sterling | 274 | |

== See also ==
- St. Catharines Municipal Election Information Page
