= 2006 St. Catharines municipal election =

- November 13, 2006
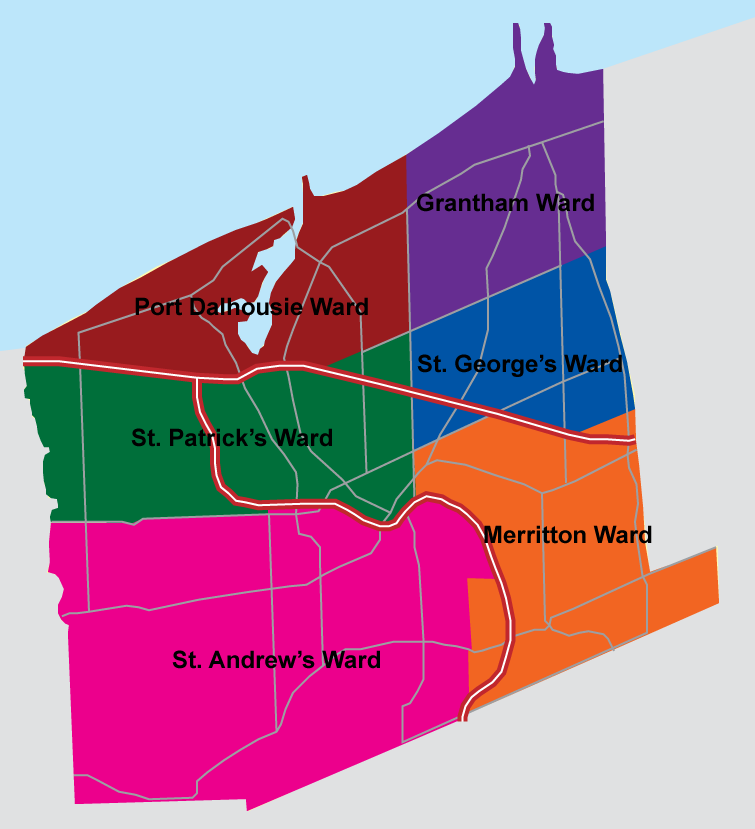
- The Ward boundaries for the 2006 Election. The Mayor and regional councillors are elected across the city, Councillors in their respective wards.
Mayor before election
Tim Rigby
Elected mayor
Brian McMullan

The 2006 St. Catharines municipal election took place on 13 November 2006 to determine a mayor, regional and city councillors and school trustees in the city of St. Catharines, Ontario. The incumbent mayor, Tim Rigby, vacated the mayoral position and ran for election to Niagara Regional Council.

Report
Eligible Voters	94607
Ballots Cast	38474
Turnout	40.7%

== Mayoral results ==
Candidate	Vote	%
Brian McMullan	15067	39.6
Rob Welch	6047	15.9
Marilyn C. Bodogh	4412	11.6
Jackie Phelan	3390	8.9
Preston Haskell	3261	8.6
Sue Erskine	3207	8.4
Garry Robbins	2263	5.9
Emad Zawady	411	1.1
Total valid votes	38,088	100.00

== Niagara Regional Council ==
2006 St. Catharines municipal election: Niagara Regional Councillor (six elected)
Candidate	Votes	%
(x)Judy Casselman	18,666	13.71
(x)Peter Partington	16,771	12.32
(x)Michael R. Collins	16,416	12.06
(x)Brian Heit	16,273	11.95
(x)Bruce Timms	15,473	11.37
(x)Ronna Katzman	13,846	10.17
(x)Tim Rigby	13,137	9.65
N. Carlos Garcia	10,301	7.57
Rob Hesp	8,145	5.98
Bart Brouwer	7,091	5.21
Total valid votes	136,119	100.00

Electors could vote for six candidates.
Percentages are determined in relation to the total number of votes.

- Judy Casselman has a Diploma in Public Health Nursing, and has worked as a registered nurse. She represented Ward Two (St. Andrews) on city council from 1992 to 2003, and was deputy mayor in the 1990s. She was elected to the regional council in 2003 and re-elected in 2006, topping the polls both times. Casselman is an advocate for preserving rural lands. She was a founding member of Heritage St. Catharines, Friends of the Twelve and the St. Catharines Community Foundation, and is a board member of the Niagara Symphony.
- Michael R. Collins is a graduate of Carleton University, and for many years taught Communication and Municipal Finance at Niagara College. He served three terms as a St. Catharines city councillor, and has been a member of the Niagara Regional Council since 1985. He opposed a provincial Sunday shopping extension in the 1980s, and was chair of a local group called People for Sunday. He called for a freeze on welfare as a form of guaranteed income during the early 1990s, and supported a pioneer needle exchange program in 1992. Collins has served on several local organizations and committees, including the Niagara Regional Housing Board and the Niagara Escarpment Commission, and is a board member of the Association of Municipalities of Ontario.
- Brian Heit was a St. Catharines city councillor from 1988 to 2003. He served on every major committee, and was deputy mayor for two terms. He was first elected to the Niagara Regional Council in 2003, and has served on the Corporate and Financial Services Committee and the Human Resources Committee.
- Ronna Katzman was elected as a School Board Trustee in 1991 and 1994, and as a St. Catharines City Councillor in 1997 and 2000. She was first elected to the Niagara Regional Council in 2003, and has served on the Public Health and Social Services Committee. In 2002, she recommended that St. Catharines phase out its purchase of electricity from polluting plants. She has been a member of many boards and associations, including the St. Catharines Downtown Association.
- N. Carlos Garcia is a businessman, with consulting experience in North America, Europe, East Asia and Africa. He has Bachelor of Science, Master of Science and Master of Business Administration degrees, and is past chair of Port Realizing our Unique Distinction (PROUD), an historical preservation group in the Port Dalhousie area of St. Catharines. PROUD opposed development plans proposed by the Port Dalhousie Vitalization Corp. (PDVC).
- Bart Brouwer was born in the Netherlands in 1983, and moved to Canada in 1997. He is a member of the Covenant Christian Reformed Church, and assisted in the 2006 federal election.

== St. Catharines City Council ==
Candidate	Vote	%
Ward 1 - Merriton
Jeff Burch	2857	33.01%
Jennie Stevens (X)	2849	32.92%
Sheila Morra (X)	2049	23.68%
Robbie Craine	899	10.39%
Ward 2 - St. Andrew's
Andrew Gill	3454	33.65%
Joseph Kushner (X)	3199	31.16%
Cam Donevan (X)	2372	23.11%
Wayne Sadlak	1241	12.09%
Ward 3 - St. George's
Greg Washuta (X)	3432	47.67%
Peter Secord (X)	2635	36.60%
Darren Platakis	1133	15.74%
Ward 4 - St. Patrick's
Heather Foss	2173	24.19%
Mark Elliott	1520	16.92%
Milica Kovacevich	1414	15.74%
John Bacher	1205	13.41%
Bill Buckle	1025	11.41%
Charles Gervais (X)	1016	11.31%
Matthew Cutler	631	7.02%
Ward 5 - Grantham
Bill Phillips	2833	21.14%
Dawn Dodge (X)	2543	18.98%
Brian Dorsey (X)	2173	16.22%
Mike Sullivan	2029	15.14%
Salvatore Sorrento	1807	13.49%
Laura Ip	1332	9.94%
Tony Tullo	683	5.10%
Ward 6 - Port Dalhousie
Bruce Williamson (X)	3818	30.71%
Len Stack	2384	19.17%
Norm St. George	2256	18.15%
Susan Bassett	1372	11.04%
Tim Atherton	1172	9.43%
Mark Klimchuk	739	5.94%
Richard Martinelli	385	3.10%
David P. Prentice	307	2.47%

== Niagara Catholic District School Board ==
Trustee, Ward 1

Candidate	Vote	%
Tony Scalzi	631	50.28%
Alex McKee	624	49.72%

Trustee, Ward 2,3,4,5,6

Candidate	Vote	%
Maurice Charbonneau	4951	38.82%
Kathy Burtnik	3176	24.9%
Lorna Costantini	2287	17.93%
Larry Newton	1524	11.95%
Suzanne Westera	816	6.4%

== District School Board of Niagara ==
Candidate	Vote	%
Lora Campbell	11320	18.32%
Marcy Heit	11260	18.23%
Dalton Clark	10123	16.4%
Lynn Campbell	6591	10.67%
Andrew L. Bowles	6132	9.93%
John Davis	5924	9.59%
Elaine Manocha	4315	6.98%
Flavia Orvitz	3682	5.69%
Shawn Montreuil	2422	3.92%
