= 2000 St. Catharines municipal election =

← 1997	November 13, 2000	2003 →
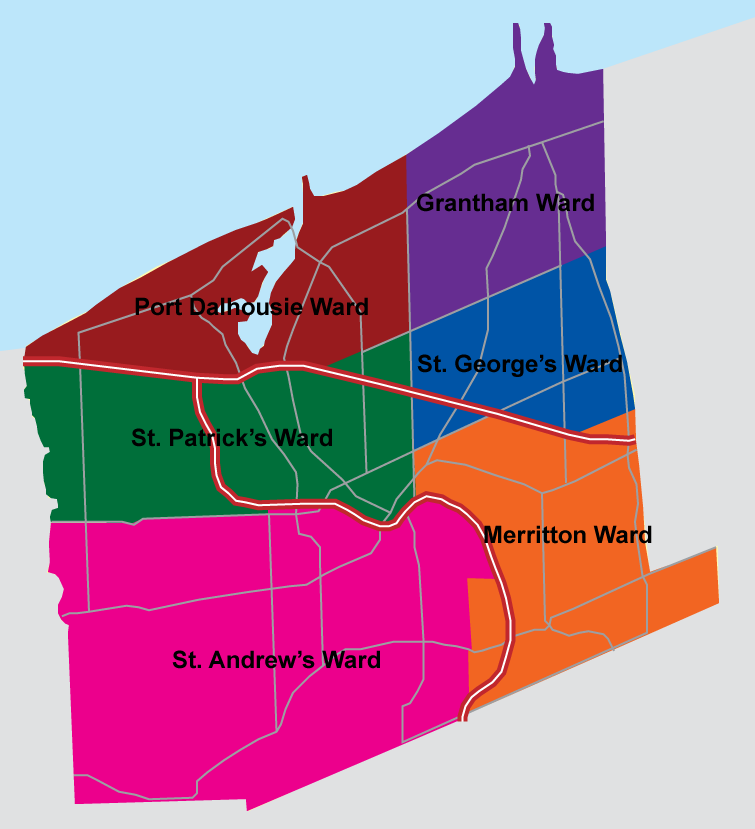
- The Ward boundaries for the 2000 Election. The Mayor and regional councillors are elected across the city, Councillors in their respective wards.
Mayor before election
Tim Rigby
Elected mayor
Tim Rigby

The St. Catharines municipal election of 2000 was held to elect a mayor and councillors for the city of St. Catharines, Ontario.

== Mayor ==
2000 St. Catharines municipal election: Mayor
Candidate	Votes	%
(x)Tim Rigby	acclaimed	-

== Niagara Regional Council ==
2000 St. Catharines municipal election: Niagara Regional Councillor (six elected)
Candidate	Votes	%
T. Roy Adams	17,167	15.18
Michael R. Collins	13,890	12.28
Bruce Timms	13,750	12.16
Peter Partington	13,123	11.61
Mark Brickell	13,015	11.51
Brian McMullan	11,571	10.23
Christel Haeck	10,444	9.24
James Wilson	7,670	6.78
Ted Mouradian	6,544	5.79
John E. Kirby	5,900	5.22
Total valid votes	113,074	100.00

Electors could vote for six candidates.
Percentages are determined in relation to the total number of votes.

== St. Catharines City Council ==
=== Ward 1 - Merriton ===
Candidate	Total votes	% of total votes
James Almas	2,589	37.17%
Wendy Patriquin	2,060	29.57%
Jennifer Stevens	1,711	24.56%
George Goff	606	8.70%

=== Ward 2 - St. Andrew's ===
Candidate	Total votes	% of total votes
Joseph Kushner	2,802	34.30%
Judy Casselman	2,201	26.94%
Joseph Cosby	1,568	19.19%
Doug Greenaway	977	11.96%
Phil MacKinnon	318	3.89%
Rob Gilmour	303	3.71%

=== Ward 3 - St. George's ===
Candidate	Total votes	% of total votes
Greg Washuta	2,491	35.82%
Rondi Craig	2,195	31.56%
Marie Poirier	1,329	19.11%
Doug Hobbs	940	13.52%

=== Ward 4 - St. Patrick's ===
Candidate	Total votes	% of total votes
Carol Disher	1,838	30.33%
Ronna Katzman	1,838	30.33%
John A. Davis	1,249	20.61%
Frank Hampson	1,136	18.74%

- Carol Disher was elected to council in 1997, 2000 and 2003. She was president of the Niagara Bruce Trail Club in the early 1990s. She tried to prevent the merger of Hamilton and St. Catharines power utilities in 2004, and unsuccessfully urged council to ban the cosmetic use of pesticides in January 2006. She was also a prominent opponent of the Port Dalhousie tower complex purchase.

=== Ward 5 - Grantham ===
Candidate	Total votes	% of total votes
Dawn Dodge	2,873	29.10%
Brian Heit	2,566	25.99%
Brian Dorsey	2,403	24.34%
Clarice West-Hobbs	1,394	14.12%
Dan Antonides	637	6.45%

=== Ward 6 - Port Dalhousie ===
Candidate	Total votes	% of total votes
Bruce Williamson	2,592	26.57%
Sue Erskine	2,237	22.93%
Norm St. George	1,530	15.68%
Erick R. Roberts	1,362	13.96%
Morton Sider	1,335	13.68%
Henry Bosch	701	7.18%
