= Rick Dykstra =

Canadian politician (born 1966)

President of the Progressive Conservative Party of Ontario
- In office March 10, 2016 – January 28, 2018
- Preceded by: Richard Ciano
- Succeeded by: Jag Badwal

Member of Parliament for St. Catharines
- In office January 23, 2006 – August 4, 2015
- Preceded by: Walt Lastewka
- Succeeded by: Chris Bittle

Personal details
- Born: Richard Dykstra; April 10, 1966 (age 60) Grimsby, Ontario, Canada
- Party: Progressive Conservative (Provincial); Conservative (Federal)
- Spouse: Kathy Dykstra
- Education: Brock University; York University
- Profession: Businessman, lobbyist

Richard Dykstra (born April 10, 1966) is a Canadian politician. He served as president of the Progressive Conservative Party of Ontario from 2016 to 2018. He also served as the member of Parliament (MP) for the Ontario riding of St. Catharines from 2006 to 2015. He was first elected to the House of Commons of Canada in the 2006 federal election. He was re-elected in 2008 and 2011 but was defeated by Liberal candidate Chris Bittle in the 2015 federal election.

== Early life and career ==
Dykstra was born in Grimsby, Ontario. Dykstra's parents, born in the Netherlands, immigrated to Montreal in 1951 and moved to the area around Halifax a year later, where they started an agricultural company. Dykstra has a Bachelor of Arts degree in political science from Brock University, and a Master's Certificate in Project Management from York University. He served for twelve years as president of Dykstra Landscaping, a family business.

His brother, Larry Dykstra, was a Niagara Regional Councillor from 1994 to 1997.

== Municipal politics ==
Dykstra served on the St. Catharines City Council from 1991 to 1997, representing St. Patrick's ward. In 1992, he encouraged the provincial government of Bob Rae to lower its gas tax to combat cross-border shopping, which was adversely affecting Ontario businesses.

He served as chair of the Standing Committee on Finance for five of the six years he served on Council. He was responsible for the first budget to decrease spending in a budget year. He also served six years on the Library Board and chaired the board in 1997.

In 1996, he attempted to have a book entitled Invisible Darkness by Stephen Williams banned from the city library. The book detailed the crimes of Paul Bernardo and Karla Homolka. Bernardo and Homolka were former residents of St. Catharines, and Dykstra argued that he was acting to protect the interests of their victims. The board voted to keep the book in circulation, but ruled that patrons could not remove it from the library.

Dykstra ran for mayor of St. Catharines in 1997, and finished second against Tim Rigby.

== Working in provincial politics ==
Dykstra worked for the Ontario provincial government from 1998 to 2002, during Mike Harris's administration, and served in two Ministries and in the Office of the Premier. He worked at the management board as a senior policy advisor, served as chief of staff to the Minister of Community and Social Services John Baird, and was director of caucus and public relations. While working for John Baird, Dykstra was among a group of political staff members who were criticized for excessive expense spending. Between January 2000 and March 2001, Dykstra billed over $7,000 while serving as Baird's executive assistant. Including $200 dinners at Toronto's Bier Market and Fiddlers Green pub.

Dykstra was appointed to the Niagara Parks Commission in 2003.

== Federal politics ==
Dykstra co-chaired Conservative candidate Dean Allison's campaign in Niagara West—Glanbrook for the 2004 federal election. Dykstra was first elected to the House of Commons in 2006, defeating Liberal incumbent Walt Lastewka by 244 votes, one of the closest races in the country. The Conservative Party won a minority government in the election, and Dykstra sat in Parliament as a government backbencher and served as a member of the Standing Committees on Justice and Finance. In 2007, he co-authored the "Dissenting Opinion of the Conservative Party of Canada" to a document entitled "Taxing Income Trusts: Reconcilable or Irreconcilable differences?" which agreed with the government's decision to implement a 31.5% tax on income trusts.

In April 2007, Dykstra and his colleague Dean Allison introduced a private member's bill proposing to eliminate the so-called Faint-Hope Clause. In November 2007, he introduced a private member's bill seeking to end the practice of giving double credit for time served in custody prior to sentencing.

In April 2008, Dykstra introduced a motion to have the Finance Committee study the abolition of the penny. He later brought forward a motion to have the Justice Committee study the investigative approach of the Canadian Human Rights Commission.

On November 7, 2008, Dykstra was appointed by the Prime Minister as the Parliamentary Secretary to the Minister of Citizenship and Immigration. Parliamentary Secretaries are charged with coordinating government policy through the committee process, and responding to questions in the House of Commons when the Minister is on official business.

On September 7, 2010, the federal Ethics Commissioner, issued a report in which the Commissioner found that “Mr. Dykstra personally solicited funds from individuals with whom he had official dealings shortly before and after the fundraising event”. While the Commissioner determined that this soliciting was not in breach of the Conflict of Interest Act, the Commissioner did note that, in this case, the Act was a lesser standard than under the Conflict of Interest and Post-Employment Code for Public Office Holders which applied before the Stephen Harper government came to power. Commissioner Dawson issued a warning to Dykstra to exercise caution in the future when making decisions that would have a significant impact on those he was soliciting donations from.

In 2010 and 2012, Dykstra caused further controversy when he voted against anti-abortion legislation, in particular Bill C-510 and Motion 312. Motion 312 was a motion that would study when life began. His decision was seen as hypocritical because, in a 2006 survey put out by Campaign Life Coalition, Dykstra was listed as believing that life began at conception. In that same survey, Dykstra said that he would support measures to pass legislation to restrict abortion. Bill C-510, also known as Roxanne's Law, was proposed to protect pregnant women from being forced into abortion, and so his decision to vote against it in 2010, was also seen as hypocritical. On November 11, 2009, Dykstra received criticism when he was photographed using his BlackBerry during a Remembrance Day ceremony in St. Catharines. Dykstra stated that he was writing a brief note about the event to be uploaded to his blog and using the device's camera to photograph the wreaths. The photograph was taken by Renate Hodges, the campaign manager for former Liberal candidate, Walt Lastewka.

In August 2015, Dykstra was present for the raising of the Pride flag at city hall in St. Catharines, in support of the gay and lesbian community in St. Catharines.

On October 2, 2015, BuzzFeed reported that Dykstra bought alcohol for high school-aged girls at a nightclub in St. Catharines on September 2, 2015, and that an associate and supporter of his had offered a 16-year-old girl indefinite VIP service at the same club once she became of legal drinking age if she would refrain from tweeting about the night and if she would claim that Dykstra never bought her drinks. Dykstra denied he knowingly bought under age girls any alcohol saying that he assumed anyone at the nightclub was of legal drinking age.

On August 4, 2015, Dykstra lost his seat to Liberal candidate Chris Bittle.

== Provincial politics ==
On March 6, 2016, Dykstra was acclaimed President of the Progressive Conservative Party of Ontario at its General Meeting in Ottawa, after his friend Patrick Brown, who had won the party leadership the year before, negotiated a deal to get the only other candidate to drop out.

On October 22, 2016, Dykstra's bid to stand for a by-election in Niagara-West Glanbrook was defeated by the local party membership, who nominated in his stead socially and politically conservative 19-year-old Brock University student Sam Oosterhoff.

Dykstra resigned as party president on January 28, 2018, several days after party leader Patrick Brown was forced to resign due to allegations of sexual misconduct. Dykstra resigned hours after Maclean's contacted him for reaction to allegations by a former staffer to another Conservative MP that she has been sexually assaulted by Dykstra the night the 2014 Canadian federal budget was released. According to the article, which was published later that night, the allegation had been brought to the attention of the Conservative campaign war room during the 2015 federal election, but Dykstra was not dropped as a candidate. On February 2, 2018, then Prime Minister Stephen Harper revealed in a statement that he knew about the allegations during the 2015 election but could not justify removing him as a candidate because the investigation was closed by police a year ago. However, this incident created a tense discussion between the campaign chair Guy Giorno, the campaign manager, Jenni Byrne, who advocated for his removal as a candidate while party lawyer Arthur Hamilton and Ray Novak, Harper's chief of staff, argued against his removal during the campaign.

On January 31, 2018, Conservative leader Andrew Scheer ordered a third-party investigation into the facts surrounding how Dykstra remained a candidate in the 2015 election after fellow MP Michelle Rempel publicly declared her outrage over the incident while MP Maxime Bernier and Brad Trost publicly demanded an investigation.

== Electoral record ==
2015 Canadian federal election
| Party | Candidate | Votes | % | ±% | Expenditures |
|---|---|---|---|---|---|
| Liberal | Chris Bittle | 24,870 | 43.18 | +22.49 | $100,562.32 |
| Conservative | Rick Dykstra | 21,637 | 37.57 | -13.09 | $188,880.75 |
| New Democratic | Susan Erskine-Fournier | 9,511 | 16.51 | -7.44 | $30,053.13 |
| Green | Jim Fannon | 1,488 | 2.58 | -1.25 | – |
| Communist | Saleh Waziruddin | 85 | 0.15 | -0.05 | – |
| Total valid votes/Expense limit | | 57,591 | 100.0 | | $222,166.81 |
| Total rejected ballots | | 243 | – | – | |
| Turnout | | 57,834 | – | – | |
| Eligible voters | | 84,474 | | | |
| Liberal gain from Conservative | | Swing | | +17.79 | |
Source: Elections Canada

2011 Canadian federal election
| Party | Candidate | Votes | % | ±% | Expenditures |
|---|---|---|---|---|---|
| Conservative | Rick Dykstra | 25,571 | 50.9% | 2,087 | $86,316.87 |
| New Democratic | Mike Williams | 11,973 | 23.8% | 2,545 | $6,754.54 |
| Liberal | Andrew Gill | 10,358 | 20.6% | -4,294 | $76,632.64 |
| Green | Jennifer Mooradian | 1,924 | 3.8% | -1,553 | $2,828.62 |
| Communist | Saleh Waziruddin | 91 | 0.2% | -22 | $502.88 |
| Christian Heritage | Dave Bylsma | 357 | 0.7% | 357 | $8,053.79 |
| Total valid votes | | 50,274 | | | |
| Rejected ballots | | 226 | | | |
| Turnout | | 50,500 | | | |

2008 Canadian federal election
| Party | Candidate | Votes | % | ±% |
|---|---|---|---|---|
| Conservative | Rick Dykstra | 23,474 | 45.9% | 1,770 |
| Liberal | Walt Lastewka | 14,652 | 28.6% | -6,775 |
| New Democratic | George Addision | 9,428 | 18.4% | -2,405 |
| Green | Jim Fannon | 3,477 | 6.8% | 1,163 |
| Communist | Sam Hammond | 113 | 0.2% | 146 |
| Total valid votes | | 51,144 | | |
| Rejected ballots | | 161 | | |
| Turnout | | 51,305 | | |

2006 Canadian federal election: St. Catharines
| Party | Candidate | Votes | % | ±% | Expenditures |
|---|---|---|---|---|---|
| Conservative | Rick Dykstra | 21,668 | 37.5 | +2.8 | $78,093.76 |
| Liberal | Walt Lastewka | 21,424 | 37.0 | −3.4 | $76,408.07 |
| New Democratic | Jeff Burch | 11,849 | 20.5 | +1.2 | $15,482.42 |
| Green | Jim Fannon | 2,306 | 4.0 | +0.3 | $991.15 |
| Christian Heritage | Bill Bylsma | 499 | 0.9 | −0.5 | $8,736.24 |
| Marxist–Leninist | Elaine Couto | 100 | 0.2 | +0.1 | |
| Total valid votes | | 57,846 | 100.0 | | |
Sources: Official Results, Elections Canada and Financial Returns, Elections Canada.

1997 St. Catharines municipal election: Mayor
| Candidate | Votes | % |
|---|---|---|
| Tim Rigby | 14,193 | 42.32 |
| Rick Dykstra | 11,181 | 33.34 |
| Tom Derreck | 8,162 | 24.34 |
| Total valid votes | 33,536 | 100.00 |

Dykstra was elected to the St. Catharines city council for Ward Four (St. Patrick's Ward) in 1991 and 1994.

All federal election information is taken from Elections Canada. Italicized expenditures refer to submitted totals, and are presented when the final reviewed totals are not available.

The 1997 municipal results are taken from the Hamilton Spectator, November 11, 1997, B9. The final official results were not significantly different.
