= 2022 Niagara Region municipal elections =

Canadian local elections

- October 24, 2022
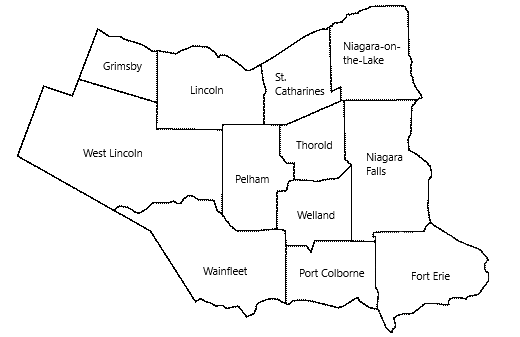
- Map of the Regional Municipality of Niagara, showing its component municipalities.

Elections were held in the Niagara Region of Ontario on October 24, 2022, in conjunction with municipal elections across the province.

== Niagara Regional Council ==
Position	Elected
Fort Erie Mayor	Wayne H. Redekop
Fort Erie Councillor	Tom Insinna
Grimsby Mayor	Jeff Jordan
Grimsby Councillor	Michelle Seaborn
Lincoln Mayor	Sandra Easton (acclaimed)
Lincoln Councillor	Robert Foster (acclaimed)
Niagara Falls Mayor	Jim Diodati
Niagara Falls Councillor	Kim Craitor
Niagara Falls Councillor	Joyce Morocco
Niagara Falls Councillor	Bob Gale
Niagara-on-the-Lake Lord Mayor	Gary Zalepa
Niagara-on-the-Lake Councillor	Andrea Kaiser
Pelham Mayor	Marvin Junkin
Pelham Councillor	Diana Huson
Port Colborne Mayor	Bill Steele
Port Colborne Councillor	Fred Davies (acclaimed)
St. Catharines Mayor	Mat Siscoe
St. Catharines Councillor	Jim Bradley
St. Catharines Councillor	Laura Ip
St. Catharines Councillor	Haley Bateman
St. Catharines Councillor	Peter Secord
St. Catharines Councillor	Tim Rigby
St. Catharines Councillor	Sal Sorrento
Thorold Mayor	Terry Ugulini
Thorold Councillor	Tim Whalen
Wainfleet Mayor	Brian Grant
Welland Mayor	Frank Campion
Welland Councillor	Leanna Villella
Welland Councillor	Pat Chiocchio
West Lincoln Mayor	Cheryl Ganann
West Lincoln Councillor	Albert Witteveen

== Fort Erie ==
=== Mayor ===
The results for mayor of Fort Erie were as follows:

Mayoral Candidate	Vote	%
Wayne H. Redekop (X)	6,195	67.26
Peter Taras	1,940	21.06
Daniel Leo Favero	1,075	11.67

=== Regional councillor ===
The results for regional councillor were as follows:

Candidate	Vote	%
Tom Insinna (X)	5,931	67.99
Peter Nolan	2,792	32.01

== Grimsby ==
The results for mayor and regional councillor for Grimsby were as follows:

=== Mayor ===
Mayoral Candidate	Vote	%
Jeff Jordan (X)	7,193	80.80
John Dunstall	1,709	19.20

=== Regional councillor ===
Candidate	Vote	%
Michelle Seaborn	4,476	51.69
Wayne Fertich (X)	4,183	48.31

== Lincoln ==
The results for mayor and regional councillor for Lincoln were as follows:

=== Mayor ===
Mayoral Candidate	Vote	%
Sandra Easton (X)	Acclaimed	

=== Regional councillor ===
Candidate	Vote	%
Robert Foster (X)	Acclaimed	

== Niagara Falls ==
=== Mayor ===
2022 Niagara Falls municipal election
- October 24, 2022
- Turnout: 27.53%
Candidate	Jim Diodati	Sandra Marie Mac Kinnon	Connie Topolinsky
Popular vote	12,055	1,676	1,648
Percentage	66.72%	9.28%	9.12%
Mayor before election
Jim Diodati
Elected mayor
Jim Diodati

Mayoral Candidate	Vote	%
Jim Diodati (X)	12,055	66.72
Sandra Marie Mac Kinnon	1,676	9.28
Connie Topolinsky	1,648	9.12
Muhammad Shafique	798	4.42
Joe White	715	3.96
Roland Weeks	612	3.39
Grant Hall	563	3.12

=== Regional Council ===
Three to be elected at-large. Regional councillors do not sit in city council.

Candidate	Total votes	%
Kim Craitor	9,197	20.51
Joyce Morocco	7,974	17.79
Bob Gale (X)	6,434	14.35
Barbara Greenwood (X)	6,320	14.10
Carolyn Ioannoni	5,199	11.60
Kevin Maves	3,692	8.24
Tony Caruso	3,482	7.77
Karen Fraser	2,535	5.65

=== Niagara Falls City Council ===
Eight to be elected at-large.

Candidate	Vote	%
Mike Strange (X)	9,788	9.24
Lori Lococo (X)	9,667	9.13
Ruth-Ann Nieuwesteeg	8,642	8.16
Tony Baldinelli	7,333	6.92
Victor Pietrangelo (X)	7,239	6.83
Wayne Campbell (X)	6,609	6.24
Mona Patel	6,433	6.07
Wayne Thomson (X)	6,294	5.94
Chris Dabrowski (X)	5,896	5.57
Vince Kerrio (X)	5,471	5.16
Dan Moody	4,104	3.87
Anne Radojcic	3,718	3.51
Tim Housser	2,978	2.81
Jim Dandy	2,904	2.74
Rebecca Crothers	2,651	2.50
Tawnya Hartford	2,288	2.16
Mike Cushman	2,194	2.07
Christian Bell	2,007	1.89
Gary Baker	1,943	1.83
Joedy Burdett	1,621	1.53
Glen Mercer	1,254	1.18
Peter Giblett	1,150	1.09
Saeed Malik	1,026	0.97
Mo Wasif	955	0.90
Harvey Gordon	885	0.84
Sherfudeen Mohamed	884	0.83

== Niagara-on-the-Lake ==
The results for lord mayor and regional councillor for Niagara-on-the-Lake were as follows:

=== Lord Mayor ===
Lord Mayoral Candidate	Vote	%
Gary Zalepa	3,724	49.14
Betty Disero (X)	2,586	34.13
Vaughn Goettler	1,268	16.73

=== Regional councillor ===
Candidate	Vote	%
Andrea Kaiser	3,100	44.03
Paolo Miele	1,709	24.28
William A. Roberts	1,134	16.11
Pat Darte	910	12.93
Barbara Worthy	187	2.66

== Pelham ==
The results for mayor and regional councillor for Pelham were as follows:

=== Mayor ===
Mayoral Candidate	Vote	%
Marvin Junkin (X)	2,967	57.67
Frank Adamson	2,178	42.33

=== Regional councillor ===
Candidate	Vote	%
Diana Huson (X)	3,461	69.47
Wally Braun	1,026	20.59
Fred Sarvis	495	9.94

== Port Colborne ==
The results for mayor and regional councillor for Port Colborne were as follows:

=== Mayor ===
Brothers Bill and Charles Steele ran against each other.

Mayoral Candidate	Vote	%
Bill Steele (X)	3,054	62.84
Charles Steele	1,806	37.16

=== Regional councillor ===
Candidate	Vote	%
Fred Davies	Acclaimed	

== St. Catharines ==
2022 St. Catharines municipal election
- October 24, 2022
- Turnout: 26.31%
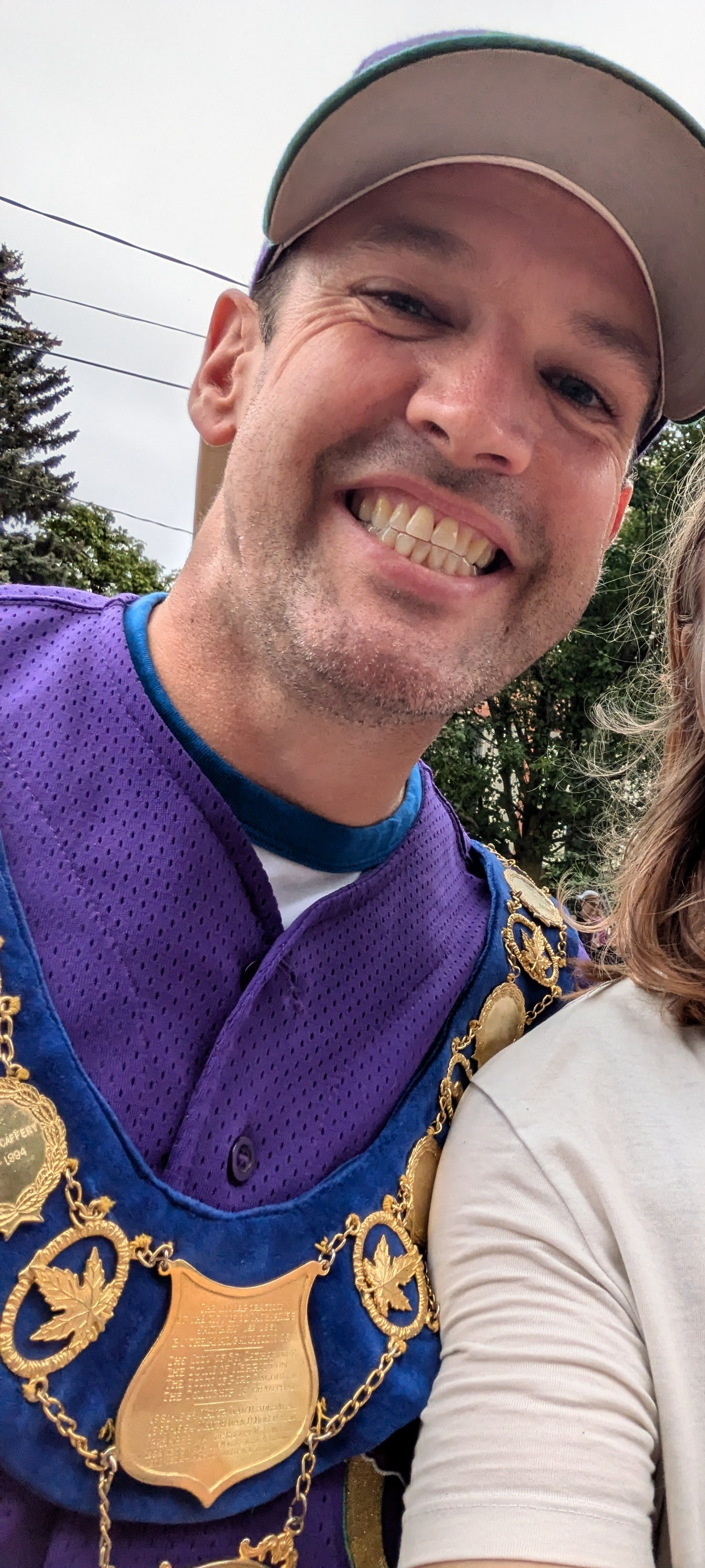
Candidate	Mat Siscoe	Mike Britton	Nick Petrucci
Popular vote	17,808	6,521	1,571
Percentage	68.76%	25.18%	6.07%
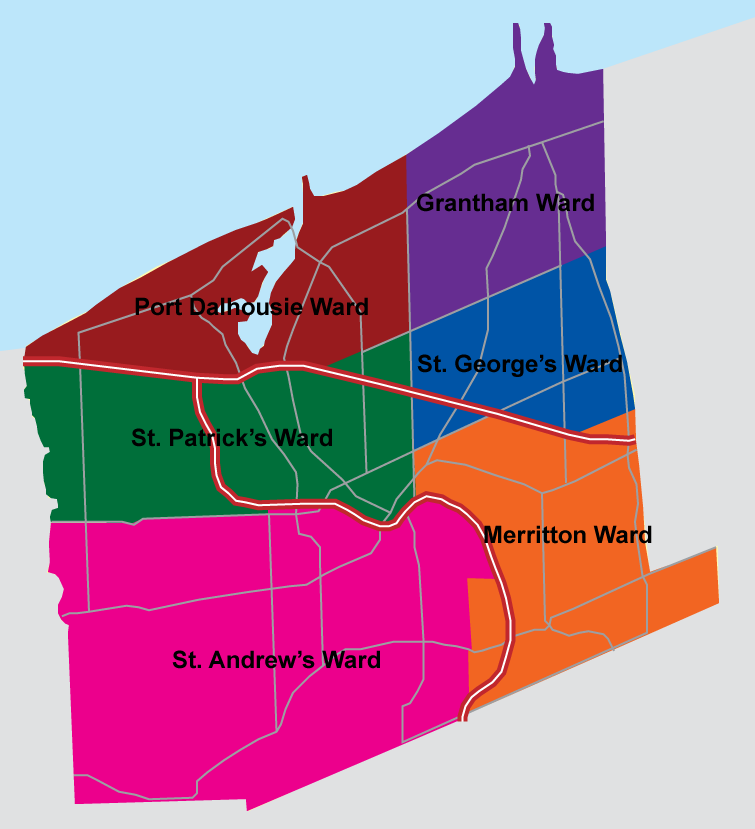
- The Ward boundaries for the 2022 Election. The Mayor and regional councillors are elected across the city, Councillors in their respective wards.
Mayor before election
Walter Sendzik
Elected mayor
Mat Siscoe

The 2022 St. Catharines municipal election took place on Monday October 24, 2022 to determine a mayor, regional and city councillors and school trustees in the city of St. Catharines, Ontario. Nominations opened on May 2 and close on August 19.

=== Mayor ===
Incumbent mayor Walter Sendzik announced on May 10, 2022, that he would not be running for re-election. Sendzik was elected in 2014 and re-elected in 2018. Running to replace him are regional councillors Mike Britton and Mat Siscoe.

Mayoral Candidate	Vote	%
Mat Siscoe	17,808	68.76
Mike Britton	6,521	25.18
Nick Petrucci	1,571	6.07

=== Regional Council ===
Six to be elected at-large. Regional councillors do not sit on city council.

Candidate	Total votes	% of total votes
Jim Bradley (X)	16,960	16.30
Laura Ip (X)	10,986	10.56
Haley Bateman	9,964	9.58
Peter Secord	8,150	7.83
Tim Rigby (X)	7,915	7.61
Sal Sorrento	7,798	7.50
Brian Heit (X)	7,162	6.88
Alicia Marshall	5,850	5.62
Trecia McLennan	5,060	4.86
Sabrina Hill	4,994	4.80
Rob Herzog	4,887	4.70
Dennis Van Meer	4,082	3.92
John McGill	2,693	2.59
Matthew Bradman	2,337	2.25
Bryan Blue	2,104	2.02
Steve Borisenko	1,615	1.55
Shawn Marriott	1,478	1.42

=== St. Catharines City Council ===
Two to be elected in each ward. City councillors do not sit on regional council.

==== Ward 1 - Merriton ====
Candidate	Vote	%
Greg Miller (X)	1,577	26.33
Jackie Lindal	1,343	22.42
Jennifer Mooradian	1,276	21.30
Rebecca Hahn	1,090	18.20
Jeff Sheppard	520	8.68
Joshua Young	184	3.07

==== Ward 2 - St. Andrew's ====
Candidate	Vote	%
Joseph Kushner (X)	1,924	26.08
Matt Harris (X)	1,837	24.90
Guy Graveline	1,286	17.43
Tom Neale	939	12.73
Emilio Raimondo	721	9.77
Angela Browne	670	9.08

==== Ward 3 - St. George's ====
Candidate	Vote	%
Kevin Townsend (X)	1,700	35.21
Mark Stevens	1,311	25.07
John Kedzierski	552	10.56
Tapo Chimbbganda	492	9.41
Josh Holland	415	7.94
Jason Benoit	394	7.53
Danny Leslie	365	6.98

==== Ward 4 - St. Patrick's ====
Candidate	Vote	%
Robin McPherson (X)	1,882	24.73
Caleb Ratzlaff	1,767	23.22
Spencer Bellows-De Wolfe	1,299	17.07
Noah Machek	1,182	15.53
Dave White	877	11.52
Danielle Romanuk	603	7.92

==== Ward 5 - Grantham ====
Candidate	Vote	%
Dawn Dodge (X)	3,013	36.34
Bill Phillips (X)	3,013	36.34
Bob Romeo	1,200	14.48
Steve Wojciechowski	1,064	12.83

==== Ward 6 - Port Dalhousie ====
Candidate	Vote	%
Carlos Garcia (X)	3,154	38.03
Bruce Williamson (X)	3,149	37.97
Jonathan Belgrave	1,991	24.01

==== By-election ====
Following the death of Carlos Garcia on December 9, 2024, a by-election was held in Ward 6 on April 14, 2025. The results were as follows:

Candidate	Vote	%
Marty Mako	1,878	42.03
Zach Dykstra	970	21.71
Jeff Mackie	936	20.95
Jonathan Belgrave	402	8.97
Norm St. George	168	3.76
Nick Kurzawa	80	1.79
Patrick Harb	35	0.78

== Thorold ==
The results for mayor and regional councillor for Thorold were as follows:

=== Mayor ===
Mayoral Candidate	Vote	%
Terry Ugulini (X)	3,150	72.71
Damon Ford	1,182	27.29

=== Regional councillor ===
Candidate	Vote	%
Tim Whalen (X)	2,852	67.22
Daryl Wilkinson	1,391	32.78

== Wainfleet ==
Mayor Kevin Gibson ran for a second term. The results for mayor of Wainfleet were as follows:

Mayoral Candidate	Vote	%
Brian Grant	1,067	41.24
Kevin Gibson (X)	1,055	40.78
Alfred Kiers	465	17.97

== Welland ==
The results for mayor, regional councillor and city council for Welland are as follows:

=== Mayor ===
Incumbent mayor Frank Campion was challenged by Jeff Walters, who had previously run for the Alberta Party in the 2019 Alberta general election.

Mayoral Candidate	Vote	%
Frank Campion (X)	6,456	59.26
Jeffrey David Walters	4,438	40.74

=== Regional Council ===
Two to be elected at-large. Regional councillors do not sit in city council.

Candidate	Total votes	% of total votes
Leanna Villella (X)	6,860	40.36
Pat Chiocchio (X)	6,823	40.14
Mamdouh Abdelmaksoud	3,316	19.51

=== Welland City Council ===
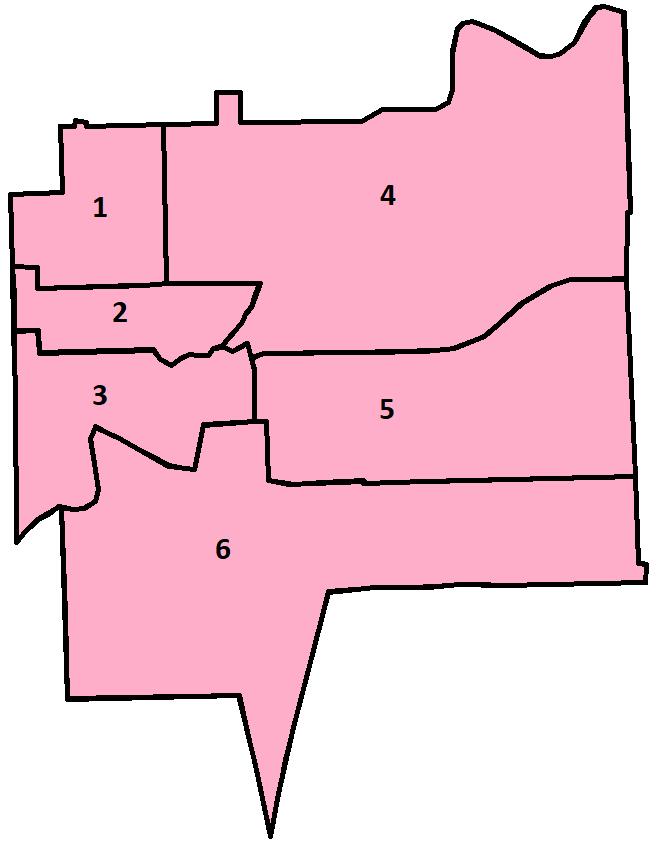
Map of Welland's wards

Two to be elected in each ward. City councillors do not sit on regional council.

==== Ward 1 ====
Candidate	Vote	%
Adam Moote (X)	893	32.36
Mary Ann Grimaldi (X)	781	28.30
Bradley Ulch	518	18.77
Jessica La Hay	397	14.38
Ryan Huckla	171	6.20

==== Ward 2 ====
Candidate	Vote	%
David McLeod (X)	1,013	28.32
Leo Van Vliet (X)	745	20.83
Kathryn Jung	586	16.38
Steve Yochim	512	14.31
Tia De Agazio	421	11.77
Serge Daoust	300	8.39

==== Ward 3 ====
Candidate	Vote	%
John Chiocchio (X)	1,060	30.22
Sharmila Setaram	961	27.39
John Mastroianni (X)	925	26.37
Graeme McMillan	562	16.02

==== Ward 4 ====
Candidate	Vote	%
Bryan Green (X)	1,197	36.13
Tony DiMarco (X)	911	27.50
Sylvia Parrotta	682	20.59
Kiron Bondale	523	15.79

==== Ward 5 ====
Candidate	Vote	%
Claudette Richard (X)	927	36.20
Graham Speck (X)	910	35.53
Mark Dzugan	724	28.27

==== Ward 6 ====
Candidate	Vote	%
Bonnie Fokkens (X)	840	28.17
Jamie Lee	668	22.40
Jim Larouche (X)	667	22.37
Cheryl Lynn Rowe	474	15.90
Steve Falusi	333	11.17

== West Lincoln ==
The results for mayor and regional councillor for West Lincoln were as follows:

=== Mayor ===
Mayoral Candidate	Vote	%
Cheryl Ganann	3,768	68.41
Dave Bylsma (X)	1,484	26.94
Greg Stephens	256	4.65

=== Regional councillor ===
Candidate	Vote	%
Albert Witteveen (X)	2,885	54.52
Peggy Cook	2,407	45.48
