= Reform Party of Canada candidates in the 1997 Canadian federal election =

The Reform Party of Canada fielded several candidates in the 1997 federal election, and won 60 seats out of 301 to form the Official Opposition. Many of the party's candidates have their own biography pages; information about others may be found here.

== Ontario ==
=== Charles Van Tuinen (Eglinton—Lawrence) ===
Van Tuinen was born on August 12, 1953, in Oakville, Ontario. He has a college-level education, and was a millwright with AFG glass in Scarborough during the 1990s. He was once vice-president and steward of his union. Van Tuinen campaigned for the Reform Party in 1993 and 1997, campaigning against high taxes, and promised to create jobs through investment. When the Liberal Party won a majority government in the 1993 election, Van Tuinen suggested that the party would inflate the country's money supply.

Electoral record
Election	Division	Party	Votes	%	Place	Winner
1993 federal	Eglinton—Lawrence	Reform	4,347	10.87	2/7	Joe Volpe, Liberal
1997 federal	Eglinton—Lawrence	Reform	3,547	8.09	4/5	Joe Volpe, Liberal

=== Peter Spadzinski (Parry Sound-Muskoka) ===
Peter Spadzinski was born in Poland and moved to Canada in 1953. He graduated from Laurentian University in history and French and took further studies at the University of Waterloo. At the time of the 1997 election, he was a vice-principal and French immersion teacher in the West Parry Sound Board of Education. Spadzinski was elected to the McDougall council in 1985, became the community's reeve in 1988, and served in the latter position until 2003.

Spadzinski received 10,909 votes (25.56%) in 1997, finishing third against Liberal incumbent Andy Mitchell.

=== Robert Hesp (St. Catharines) ===
Hesp was born on April 3, 1962. He graduated from Wheaton College in Wheaton, Illinois, USA in 1985, served as an officer with The Royal Canadian Regiment in the Canadian Regular Force and the Lincoln & Welland Regiment, and completed a Canadian Securities Course at the Canadian Securities Institute in 1993. He became an investment adviser.

Hesp joined the Reform Party on the day he left the Canadian Regular Force in 1991, and ran under its banner in two federal elections. He ran for the Niagara Regional Council in the 2006 St. Catharines municipal election, but was unsuccessful.

Electoral record
Election	Division	Party	Votes	%	Place	Winner
1993 federal	St. Catharines	Reform	14,011	28.69	2/6	Walt Lastewka, Liberal
1997 federal	St. Catharines	Reform	15,029	30.98	2/7	Walt Lastewka, Liberal
2006 St. Catharines municipal	Niagara Regional Council	n/a	8,145	5.98	9/10	Six candidates elected

=== Tom Ambas (Scarborough Southwest) ===
Ambas was born in Greece on June 12, 1951, and came to Canada in 1959. He became a businessman, working as the owner and operator of Tom Houston Boots, selling western boots, clothing and leather goods. After his brother was murdered in 1995, he started the Kid Brother Campaign calling for changes to the Young Offenders Act. His brother George Ambas ran as an independent candidate in a 1996 by-election against federal cabinet minister Sheila Copps.

Ambas was not politically active until the spring of 1997, when he joined the Reform Party and won its nomination for Scarborough Southwest. He had previously voted for the Liberal Party (Toronto Star, 30 May 1997). He received 7,918 votes (20.45%), finishing second against Liberal incumbent Tom Wappel.

=== Jim Rollo (Sudbury) ===
Jim Rollo studied for a Bachelor of Arts degree at Laurentian University. He identified as a salesman of water conservation products at the time of the election, and indicated that he was moving into the field of automotive products. He received 5,198 votes (12.96%), finishing third against Liberal incumbent Diane Marleau. He later supported the Reform Party's reconstitution as the Canadian Alliance.

=== John Stewart (Toronto Centre—Rosedale) ===
Stewart was born in Toronto, and holds a degree in International Relations from Yale University. He worked in the financial sector in Europe and the United States for over two decades, and was the chief accountant and corporate secretary of a major bank in Toronto at the time of the 1997 election. He campaigned in the 1993 election in Hamilton East against prominent Liberal incumbent Sheila Copps, and finished a distant second.

Stewart ran on a platform of "lower taxes, a balanced budget, increased health spending and decentralized federal powers" in the 1997, and also called for changes to the Young Offenders Act (Toronto Star, 30 May 1997). He was accused by one major newspaper of taking a "vehement anti-French stand" during the campaign (Toronto Star, 3 June 1997), following an all-candidates' meeting where he blamed the Liberal government for "making a conscious decision to set up multiculturalism and putting French on cereal boxes" (Toronto Star, 24 May 1997). He was also criticized for blaming child poverty on alcoholic parents, saying "If a family unit is receiving a certain amount of income and the husband or wife goes out, buys a bottle of booze and drinks it and because of that the children don't have enough to eat, I mean, how can governments control such things?" (Toronto Star, 24 May 1997). He finished a distant fourth.

Electoral record
Election	Division	Party	Votes	%	Place	Winner
1993 federal	Hamilton East	Reform	5,814		2/9	Sheila Copps, Liberal
1997 federal	Toronto Centre—Rosedale	Reform	3,646	7.82	4/9	Bill Graham, Liberal

=== Bill Serjeantson (Whitby—Ajax) ===
Serjeantson (born June 24, 1960) has a Bachelor of Science degree (Natural Sciences, 1982) and a Bachelor of Engineering degree (Electrical, 1986) from the University of Western Ontario. He became a senior engineer in Milltronics in 1996. Prior to the 1997 election, Serjeantson had held executive positions with the Progressive Conservative Party of Ontario association in Durham West, and with the Reform Party of Canada associations in Carleton—Gloucester, Whitby—Ajax and Ontario. He claimed that tax cuts, crime control and jobs were the three main issues of the campaign (Toronto Star, 30 May 1997).

Serjeantson received 11,977 votes (24.25%) in the 1997 election, finishing second against Liberal candidate Judi Longfield. He later worked as Intelligent Water Systems manager for the Delcan Corporation.

== Manitoba ==
=== Edward George Agnew (Brandon—Souris) ===
Agnew is a dentist, Amway distributor and political activist. He postponed a vacation to Hawaii in February 1990, to organize a protest against the planned federal Goods and Services Tax during a visit to Manitoba by Prime Minister Brian Mulroney. He later ran for the Reform Party in the 1993 and 1997 federal elections. Agnew has said that he joined the Reform Party because of its support for democratic populism. He joined the newly formed Conservative Party of Canada in 2004.

Electoral record
Election	Division	Party	Votes	%	Place	Winner
1993 federal	Brandon—Souris	Reform	11,163	30.37	2/8	Glen McKinnon, Liberal
1997 federal	Brandon—Souris	Reform	11,883	32.00	2/6	Rick Borotsik, Progressive Conservative

=== Corky Peterson (Churchill) ===
Peterson is a professional outdoorsman. He is a veteran trapper, and has frequently defended the industry against complaints from animal rights activists. Peterson has lectured to young students on ethical methods of trapping, and has argued that animals would die of starvation and disease without trapping (Globe and Mail, 22 February 1990). He also owns and operates a lodge in northern Manitoba.

In 1994, Peterson was listed as director of the Manitoba Registered Trappers Association (Winnipeg Free Press, 10 January 1994). He has also been a board member of the Manitoba Professional Guides Association, the Fur Institute of Canada, the Northwest Wild Rice Growers Co-op and the Grass River Corridor Tourism Association (Winnipeg Free Press, 29 May 1997).

Peterson joined the Reform Party in 1991. During the 1997 campaign, he argued against the federal government's gun registry and in favour of native self-government "based on the laws of Canada". He also called for individual ownership of land by band members. He received 4,438 votes (19.00%), finishing third against New Democratic Party candidate Bev Desjarlais.

Peterson was still listed as leader of the Manitoba Trappers Association as of 2004 (Winnipeg Free Press, 19 January 2004). He was listed as 69 years old in 1999.

=== Larry Tardiff (Provencher) ===
Larry Tardiff is a commercial real estate agent in Ste. Agathe. He is a vocal opponent of gun control legislation in Canada, and wrote several editorials on the issue during the 1990s Among other things, Tardiff argued that gun control legislation does not lead to a reduction in violent crime. He was secretary-treasurer of the Council for Responsible Firearms Ownership in Manitoba in 1995, and organized a protest against Justice Minister Allan Rock's proposed gun control legislation in January of that year. He supported John Nunziata's decision to leave the Liberal Party of Canada in 1996, after the Liberal government broke a campaign promise to eliminate Canada's Goods and Service Tax.

Tardiff was acclaimed as the Reform Party's candidate for Provencher in the 1997 federal election, and received 12,798 votes (35.08%) for a second-place finish against Liberal incumbent David Iftody. He ran a "traditional family values" campaign centered on support for the heterosexual family unit, and also reiterated his opposition to gun control.

=== Greg Yost (Winnipeg South) ===
Yost (born March 3, 1948) is a Canadian lawyer. He holds a Bachelor of Arts degree in History (1970), a Master of Arts degree in History (1972), and a Bachelor of Laws (1975), all from the University of Manitoba. Yost operated a private practice from 1976 to 1980, and began working with the Manitoba Department of Justice in 1980. He was involved in behind-the-scenes discussions involving the patriation of the Canadian Constitution, the Meech Lake Accord, and the Charlottetown Accord (Winnipeg Free Press, 10 May 1998). Initially a supporter of the Progressive Conservative Party, he voted for the Liberals in the 1993 election, out of frustration with Brian Mulroney's failed handling of the Meech Lake Accord. He joined the Reform Party in 1996 (Winnipeg Free Press, 10 May 1998).

At the time of the 1997 election, he was Director of Policy and Planning in the Manitoba provincial civil service, responsible for aboriginal justice, crime prevention, constitutional negotiations and other matters. Unlike others in his party, Yost argued that the Notwithstanding Clause of Canada's constitution cannot apply to Supreme Court decisions involved aboriginal matters.

Yost won the Reform Party nomination over rival candidate Gary Hollingshead (Winnipeg Free Press, 5 March 1997). He received 7,510 votes (19.80%) in the general election, finishing second against Liberal incumbent Reg Alcock. He continued working for the Reform Party on justice issues after the election (Toronto Star, 6 May 1999). Yost opposes special status for Quebec, and has called for more powers to be devolved to Canada's provinces (Winnipeg Free Press, 10 May 1998).

The 1997 election was called during a major flood in Winnipeg. Yost, who was forced to evacuate his own home, described the election timing as a "callous disregard for the people of southern Manitoba" (Winnipeg Free Press, 23 May 1997). Alcock's victory was due in part to his decision to turn his election headquarters into a flood relief centre (Winnipeg Free Press, 3 June 1997).
