= 2018 Niagara Region municipal elections =

Elections were held in the Niagara Region of Ontario on October 22, 2018, in conjunction with municipal elections across the province.

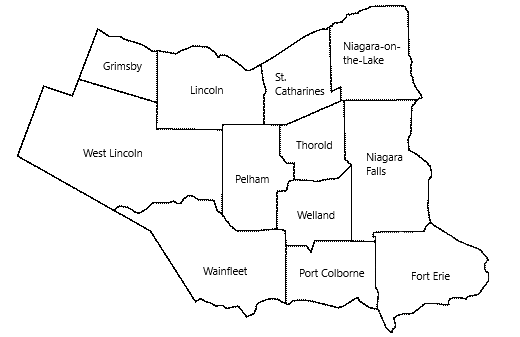
Map of the Regional Municipality of Niagara, showing its component municipalities.

== Niagara Regional Council ==
Position	Elected
Fort Erie Mayor	Wayne H. Redekop
Fort Erie Councillor	Tom Insinna
Grimsby Mayor	Jeff A. Jordan
Grimsby Councillor	Wayne Fertich
Lincoln Mayor	Sandra Easton
Lincoln Councillor	Robert Foster
Niagara Falls Mayor	Jim Diodati
Niagara Falls Councillor	Peter Nicholson
Niagara Falls Councillor	Barbara Greenwood
Niagara Falls Councillor	Bob Gale
Niagara-on-the-Lake Lord Mayor	Betty Disero
Niagara-on-the-Lake Councillor	Gary Zalepa Jr.
Pelham Mayor	Marvin Junkin
Pelham Councillor	Diana Huson
Port Colborne Mayor	Bill Steele
Port Colborne Councillor	Barbara Butters
St. Catharines Mayor	Walter Sendzik
St. Catharines Councillor	Jim Bradley
St. Catharines Councillor	George Darte
St. Catharines Councillor	Sandie Bellows
St. Catharines Councillor	Laura Ip
St. Catharines Councillor	Brian Heit
St. Catharines Councillor	Tim Rigby
Thorold Mayor	Terry Ugulini
Thorold Councillor	Tim Whalen
Wainfleet Mayor	Kevin Gibson
Welland Mayor	Frank Campion
Welland Councillor	Pat Chiocchio
Welland Councillor	Leanna Villella
West Lincoln Mayor	David Bylsma

== Regional Chair ==
For the first time, the chair of regional council was to be directly elected. However, on the last day of candidate registration the Ontario Government announced they would be cancelling this council race.

At the time of this cancellation, five candidates were registered to run for he chair position. Incumbent chair Al Caslin and Pelham Mayor Dave Augstyn both decided to run for a regional council seat in their respective municipalities.

== Fort Erie ==
=== Mayor ===
Mayoral Candidate	Vote	%
Wayne H. Redekop (X)	5,370	56.03
Stephen Passero	3,903	40.72
George Jardine	311	3.24

=== Regional Councillor ===
Candidate	Vote	%
Tom Insinna	3,783	40.67
Sandy Annunziata (X)	3,492	37.54
Joan Christensen	1,624	17.46
Douglas Baker-Smith	402	4.32

=== Fort Erie Town Council ===
==== Ward 1 ====
Candidate	Vote	%
George P. McDermott (X)	764	63.25
Dale Hirons	444	36.75

==== Ward 2 ====
Candidate	Vote	%
Nick Dubanow	838	52.87
Marlo Toppazzini	408	25.74
John Mollicone	339	21.39

==== Ward 3 ====
Candidate	Vote	%
Kimberly Zanko (X)	811	45.23
Tracey Calder Rosettani	528	29.45
Dean Demizio	277	15.45
Scott Winger	177	9.87

==== Ward 4 ====
Candidate	Vote	%
Marina Butler (X)	673	43.56
Ron Brunner	522	33.79
Pati Habermann	270	17.48
Robert Hirons	80	5.18

==== Ward 5 ====
Candidate	Vote	%
Don Lubberts (X)	599	35.03
Michael Reles	585	34.21
Leah Feor	526	30.76

==== Ward 6 ====
Candidate	Vote	%
Ann-Marie Noyes	902	57.05
Christoffer M. Knutt (X)	679	42.95

== Grimsby ==
=== Mayor ===
Mayoral Candidate	Vote	%
Jeff A. Jordan	6,344	71.51
Steve D. Berry	2,527	28.49

== Lincoln ==
=== Mayor ===
Mayoral Candidate	Vote	%
Sandra Easton (X)	4,397	66.30
Robert Condotta	2,235	33.70

== Niagara Falls ==
=== Mayor ===
Mayoral Candidate	Vote	%
Jim Diodati (X)	13,875	58.09
Kim Craitor	8,252	34.55
Dinah Lilia Mourise	1,047	4.38
Kip Finn	710	2.97

=== Regional Council ===
Three to be elected. Regional councillors do not sit in city council.

Candidate	Vote	%
Peter Nicholson	9,674	17.85
Barbara Greenwood	7,653	14.12
Bob Gale (X)	7,211	13.30
Selina Volpatti (X)	6,483	11.96
John Morocco	4,743	8.75
Tim Housser	4,262	7.86
Chris Rigas	3,744	6.91
Dianne Munro	2,912	5.37
Anne Angelone	2,630	4.85
Dave Eke	1,973	3.64
Theresa Johnson	1,942	3.58
Clarke Bitter	980	1.81

=== Niagara Falls City Council ===
8 to be elected at-large.

Candidate	Vote	%
Mike Strange (X)	12,021	8.85
Victor Pietrangelo (X)	8,846	6.51
Wayne Thomson (X)	8,355	6.15
Lori Lococo	7,666	5.64
Wayne Campbell (X)	7,413	5.46
Vince Kerrio (X)	7,356	5.41
Chris Dabrowski	7,130	5.25
Carolyn Ioannoni (X)	7,015	5.16
Joyce Morocco (X)	6,535	4.81
Rich Merlino	5,673	4.18
Kenneth Groves	5,248	3.86
Steve Ludzik	5,080	3.74
Shirley Fisher	4,276	3.15
Tony Baldinelli	3,713	2.73
Karen Stearne	3,346	2.46
Tom Stranges	3,328	2.45
Peter Dychtiar	3,122	2.30
Angela Peebles	3,047	2.24
Anne Radojcic	2,951	2.17
Peter Fischer	2,922	2.15
Norm Puttick	2,856	2.10
Gary Baker	2,594	1.91
Jamie Jones	1,972	1.45
Domenic Caruso	1,816	1.34
Christian Bell	1,727	1.27
Tim Tredwell	1,569	1.15
Lucia Baldinelli Ciampa	1,555	1.14
Margie Manker	1,528	1.12
Ralph Panucci	1,443	1.06
Nick Maruca	986	0.73
Harvey Gordon	868	0.64
Vito Pennimpede	761	0.56
Jordan Cowe	679	0.50
Daniel Faraci	455	0.33

== Niagara-on-the-Lake ==
=== Lord Mayor ===
Lord Mayoral Candidate	Vote	%
Betty Disero	4,169	50.14
Patrick Darte (X)	2,743	32.99
Daniel Turner	1,402	16.86

== Pelham ==
=== Mayor ===
Mayoral Candidate	Vote	%
Marvin Junkin	3,975	55.66
Gary Edward Accursi	1,671	23.40
Carla Baxter	1,495	20.94

== Port Colborne ==
=== Mayor ===
Mayoral Candidate	Vote	%
Bill Steele	2,634	39.88
Betty Konc	1,932	29.25
Wayne Elliott	1,789	27.09
Ron St. Jean	249	3.77

== St. Catharines ==
2018 St. Catharines municipal election
- October 22, 2018
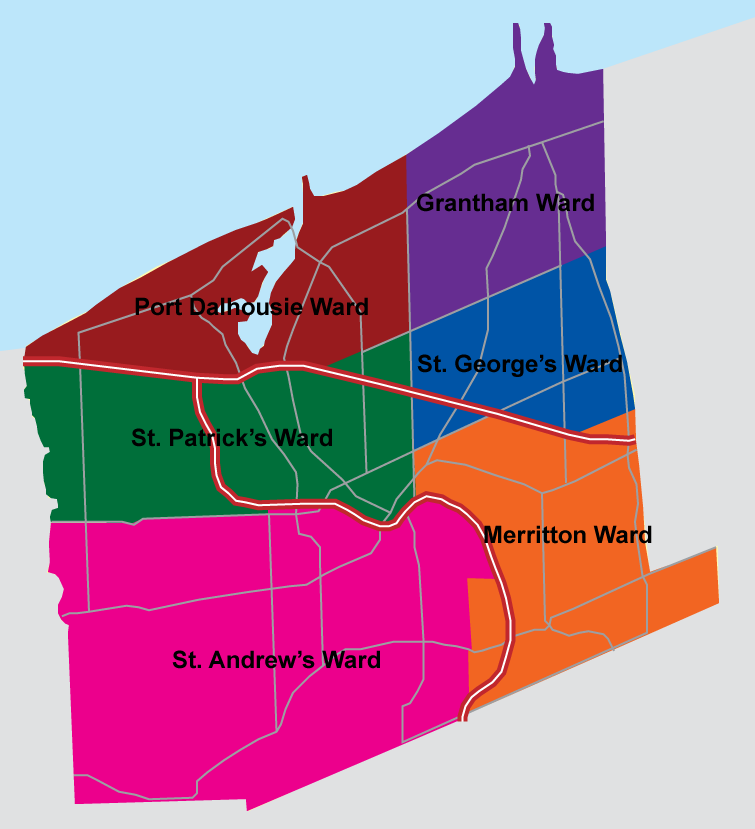
- The Ward boundaries for the 2018 Election. The Mayor and regional councillors are elected across the city, Councillors in their respective wards.
Mayor before election
Walter Sendzik
Elected mayor
Walter Sendzik

The 2018 St. Catharines municipal election took place on Monday October 22, 2018 to determine a mayor, regional and city councillors and school trustees in the city of St. Catharines, Ontario. The election of a regional chair was also scheduled, but was cancelled by the provincial government led by Premier Doug Ford on Friday July 27, 2018, the registration deadline for candidates.

=== Mayor ===
Mayoral Candidate	Vote	%
Walter Sendzik (X)	21,574	71.85
Richard Stephens	5,834	19.43
Johnny Tischler	1,465	4.88
Tunde Soniregun	1,153	3.84

=== Regional Council ===
Six to be elected at-large. Regional councillors do not sit in city council.

Candidate	Total votes	% of total votes
Jim Bradley	18,954	14.10
George Darte	12,516	9.31
Sandie Bellows	11,117	8.27
Laura Ip	9,878	7.35
Brian Heit (X)	8,499	6.32
Tim Rigby (X)	8,435	6.27
Kelly Edgar (X)	7,233	5.38
Mike Britton	6,765	5.03
Bruce Timms (X)	5,859	4.36
Haley Bateman	5,546	4.13
Mark Elliott	5,519	4.10
Rob Depetris	4,784	3.56
Mo Al Jumaily	4,105	3.05
Debbie MacGregor (X)	3,844	2.86
Emily Beth Spanton	3,421	2.54
Frank Rupcic	3,360	2.50
Peter Gill	3,247	2.42
Mary Margaret Murphy	2,763	2.06
Len Stack	2,735	2.03
Alan Caslin (X)	1,928	1.43
Lou Felice	1,476	1.10
Paul Allan	1,438	1.07
Bob Szajkowski	1,024	0.76

=== St. Catharines City Council ===
==== Ward 1 - Merriton ====
Candidate	Vote	%
Greg Miller	1,848	25.31
Lori Littleton	1,527	20.91
David Haywood (X)	1,380	18.90
Lesley Seaborne	1,121	15.35
Kim Clifford	742	10.16
Diane Foster	281	3.85
Marta Liddiard	280	3.83
Hayden Lawrence	123	1.68

==== Ward 2 - St. Andrew's ====
Candidate	Vote	%
Joe Kushner (X)	2,954	39.12
Matt Harris (X)	2,850	37.74
Emilio Raimondo	1,748	23.15

==== Ward 3 - St. George's ====
Candidate	Vote	%
Sal Sorrento (X)	1,921	30.42
Kevin Townsend	1,536	24.33
Brody Longmuir	1,475	23.36
Vicky-Lynn Smith	1,126	17.83
Thomas Grundy	256	4.05

==== Ward 4 - St. Patrick's ====
Candidate	Vote	%
Karrie Porter	3,098	41.03
Mat Siscoe (X)	2,279	30.19
Robin McPherson	2,173	28.78

==== Ward 5 - Grantham ====
Candidate	Vote	%
Bill Phillips (X)	2,860	26.52
Dawn Dodge	2,227	20.65
Jeff Brooks	1,944	18.03
Mark Stevens	1,262	11.70
Dennis Van Meer	1,067	9.90
Alan C. Ziemianin	665	6.17
Rob Gill	501	4.65
Matthew Bastead	257	2.38

==== Ward 6 - Port Dalhousie ====
Candidate	Vote	%
Carlos Garcia (X)	3,263	30.35
Bruce Williamson (X)	3,018	28.07
Jeff Mackie	2,422	22.53
Wolfgang Guembel	2,047	19.04

== Thorold ==
=== Mayor ===
Mayoral Candidate	Vote	%
Terry Ugulini	3,298	64.41
Henry D'Angela	1,822	35.59

== Wainfleet ==
=== Mayor ===
Mayoral Candidate	Vote	%
Kevin Gibson	1,009	35.29
Richard Dykstra	468	16.37
Ted Hessels	455	15.91
Andrew Watts	411	14.38
Alfred Kiers	397	13.89
Ken Martin	119	4.16

== Welland ==
=== Mayor ===
Mayoral Candidate	Vote	%
Frank Campion (X)	10,100	77.90
Steven Soos	1,453	11.21
David Clow	1,413	10.90

=== Regional Councillor ===
Two to be elected

Candidate	Vote	%
Pat Chiocchio	6,354	29.96
Leanna Villella	6,344	29.92
Paul Grenier (X)	4,735	22.33
George Marshall (X)	3,773	17.79

=== Welland City Council ===
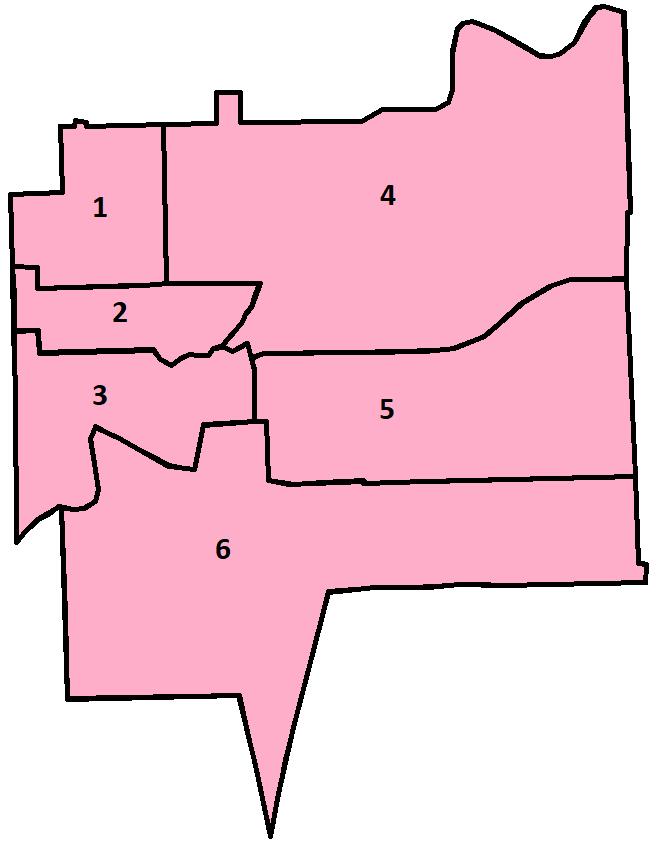
Map of Welland's wards

Two elected from each ward

==== Ward 1 ====
Candidate	Vote	%
Mary Ann Grimaldi (X)	1,000	30.07
Adam Moote	886	26.64
Ryan Huckla	639	19.21
Tom Bacolini	299	8.99
Shirley Cordiner	221	6.64
Holly Syer	219	6.58
Robin Comtois	62	1.86

==== Ward 2 ====
Candidate	Vote	%
Leo Van Vliet (X)	1,407	34.08
David McLeod (X)	1,404	34.01
Serge Daoust	535	12.6
Debi Katsmar	465	11.26
Brad Ulch	317	7.68

==== Ward 3 ====
Candidate	Vote	%
Lucas Spinosa	1,547	37.36
John Chiocchio (X)	1,191	28.76
John Mastroianni (X)	1,019	24.61
John Thomas McNall	384	9.27

===== By-election =====
A by-election was held on August 9, 2021, in Ward 3 to fill the vacancy of Lucas Spinosa who resigned.

Candidate	Vote	%
John Mastroianni	712	35.28
Steve Soos	386	19.13
Cathy Connor	341	16.90
Nancy Dmytrov Bilboe	271	13.43
Douglas R. Thomas	205	10.16
Phil Gladman	91	4.51

==== Ward 4 ====
Candidate	Vote	%
Bryan Green	1,146	28.92
Tony Dimarco (X)	1,126	28.41
Melissa McGlashan	820	20.69
Maria Lallouet	652	16.45
Phill Gladman	119	3.00
Charles Owen	100	2.52

==== Ward 5 ====
Candidate	Vote	%
Graham Speck	1,110	32.93
Claudette Richard (X)	1,099	32.60
Ken LeBlanc	662	19.64
Leslie Robichaud	233	6.91
Niki Ann Brideau	206	6.11
Devin Paul James St. Jean	61	1.81

==== Ward 6 ====
Candidate	Vote	%
Bonnie Fokkens (X)	1,096	31.76
Jim Larouche (X)	874	25.33
Mike Konderka	816	23.65
Jamie Lee	443	12.84
James Takeo	222	6.43

== West Lincoln ==
=== Mayor ===
Mayoral Candidate	Vote	%
David Bylsma	2,115	47.51
Douglas Joyner (X)	1,104	24.80
Joann Chechalk	1,034	23.23
Paul Wiebe	199	4.47
