= 1997 St. Catharines municipal election =

← 1994	November 10, 1997	2000 →
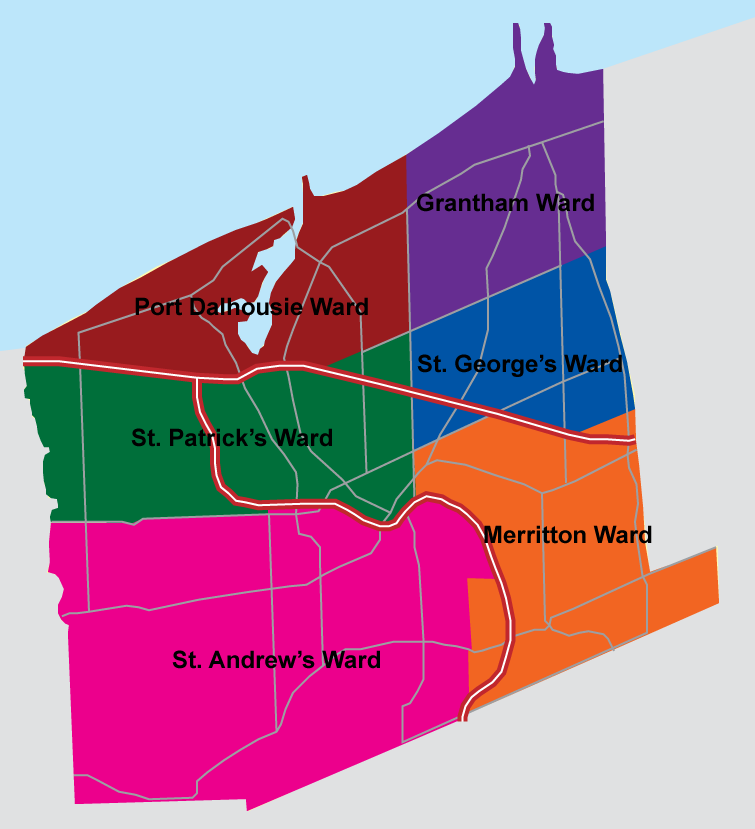
- The Ward boundaries for the 1997 Election. The Mayor and regional councillors are elected across the city, Councillors in their respective wards.
Mayor before election
Alan Unwin
Elected mayor
Tim Rigby

The St. Catharines municipal election of 1997 was held to elect a mayor and councillors for the city of St. Catharines, Ontario.

== Results ==
1997 St. Catharines municipal election: Mayor
Candidate	Votes	%
Tim Rigby	14,193	42.32
Rick Dykstra	11,181	33.34
Tom Derreck	8,162	24.34
Total valid votes	33,536	100.00

Results taken from the Hamilton Spectator, 11 November 1997, B9. The final official results were not significantly different.
