= Communist Party of Canada (Ontario) candidates in the 1981 Ontario provincial election =

The Communist Party of Canada - Ontario ran a number of candidates in the 1981 provincial election, none of whom were elected. Information on these candidates may be found here.

== Norman J. Newell (St. Catharines) ==
Newell was a resident of Niagara Falls at the time of the election. He received 132 votes (0.41%), finishing fourth against Liberal incumbent Jim Bradley.

He has remained active into the Communist Party at least into the 1990s, and donated $400 to the Ontario party in 1997.
