= Jim Bradley (politician) =

Canadian politician (1945–2025)

The Honourable James J. Bradley ECO
- Bradley in 2014

Niagara Regional Chair
- In office December 6, 2018 – September 26, 2025
- Preceded by: Alan Caslin
- Succeeded by: Bob Gale

Member of the Ontario Provincial Parliament for St. Catharines
- In office June 9, 1977 – June 7, 2018
- Preceded by: Robert Mercer Johnston
- Succeeded by: Jennie Stevens

Dean of the Legislative Assembly of Ontario
- In office October 2, 2003 – June 7, 2018 Serving with Norm Sterling (2003–2011)
- Preceded by: Sean Conway
- Succeeded by: Ted Arnott; Gilles Bisson; Jim Wilson

Personal details
- Born: February 19, 1945 Sudbury, Ontario, Canada
- Died: September 26, 2025 (aged 80) St. Catharines, Ontario, Canada
- Party: Liberal
- Occupation: Teacher

James Joseph Bradley ECO (February 19, 1945 – September 26, 2025) was a Canadian politician in Ontario. He was a long-serving Liberal member of the Legislative Assembly of Ontario, sitting as an MPP from 1977 until 2018. He represented the riding of St. Catharines and served in the provincial cabinets of David Peterson, Dalton McGuinty and Kathleen Wynne. He was elected as a regional councillor in the St. Catharines municipal election of 2018. He served as the Chair of the Regional Municipality of Niagara from 2018 until his death in 2025.

His 41-year term as an MPP is the second longest tenure in Ontario history, behind only Harry Nixon.

== Background ==
Before entering politics, Bradley was a teacher with the Lincoln County Board of Education. He was elected as a city councillor to the St. Catharines City Council in 1970, but also remained in the classroom until 1977.

== Politics ==
After failed bids in the elections of 1967 and 1971, Bradley was elected to the Ontario legislature in the 1977 election in the riding of St. Catharines, and served as MPP for that riding until the 2018 election. He fended off strong challenges from the New Democratic Party in the 1990 election and the Progressive Conservative Party in 1995 election. On all other occasions until 2018, he was re-elected easily.

=== Peterson government ===
When the Liberals came to power under David Peterson following the 1985 election, Bradley became Minister of the Environment and held that position until the Liberals were defeated in the 1990 election. He is generally regarded as Ontario's most effective Environment Minister, although some believe that his ambitions for the portfolio were undermined by Peterson and Finance Minister Robert Nixon. As Environment Minister, Bradley expanded Blue Box Recycling, making it a province-wide initiative, as well as instituting tough new penalties for polluters, enforced by a strengthened investigation and enforcement branch.

Peterson ministry, Province of Ontario (1985–1990)
Cabinet post (1)
Predecessor	Office	Successor
Susan Fish	Minister of the Environment; 1985–1990	Ruth Grier

=== In opposition ===
Bradley was a vocal opponent of Peterson's plans to call an election in 1990, preferring that the party wait until 1992 before going to the polls. While the Liberals were defeated, Bradley was personally re-elected and had a prominent position in the Opposition benches.

When Nixon, the interim leader of the Liberals, left Queen's Park to accept an appointment, he was replaced by Murray Elston. Elston resigned as interim leader to run in the 1992 leadership convention, and Bradley became interim leader of the party and interim Leader of the Opposition from November 1991 until the election of Lyn McLeod in February 1992. He remained an opposition stalwart until the Liberals won the 2003 election under Dalton McGuinty.

Legislative Assembly of Ontario
Preceded by Murray Elston	Leader of the Opposition in the Ontario Legislature; 1991–1992	Succeeded by Lyn McLeod
Party political offices
Preceded by Murray Elston	Leader of the Ontario Liberal Party; 1991–1992	Succeeded by Lyn McLeod

=== McGuinty government ===
There was some speculation that Bradley would be re-appointed Minister of the Environment in McGuinty's government, but this did not occur. Instead, he was named Minister of Tourism and Recreation on October 23, 2003. He was also given ministerial responsibility for Seniors on June 29, 2005. On October 11, 2005, Bradley was also appointed to replace Dwight Duncan as Government House Leader, following Duncan's appointment as Minister of Finance. Bradley was also the province's wine secretary, as well as the minister responsible for the Greenbelt.

On October 30, 2007, Bradley was sworn in as Minister of Transportation in McGuinty's new cabinet. As Transportation Minister, Bradley supervised the introduction of an Ontario Enhanced driver's licenses to be used at Canada/US border crossings. He introduced legislation to merge GO Transit and Metrolinx. Enacted tougher penalties for drivers who have a BAC of .05 or higher. Mandated that all commercial trucks that operate in Ontario be equipped with speed limiters to ensure heavy trucks don't exceed 105 km/h. And in April 2009, it was announced that GO Transit would be expanded to the Niagara region, with bus service to Burlington in September and with weekend rail service to Toronto starting at the end of June.

On January 18, 2010, Bradley moved to the position of Minister of Municipal Affairs and Housing. In August he was moved to the Ministry of Community Safety and Correctional Services.

On October 20, 2011, Bradley moved to become Minister of Environment once again in the wake of the 2011 election that saw the previous Minister of Environment, John Wilkinson, defeated.

McGuinty ministry, Province of Ontario (2003–2013)
Cabinet posts (5)
Predecessor	Office	Successor
John Wilkinson	Minister of the Environment; 2011–2013	McGuinty Government Ended
Rick Bartolucci	Ministry of Community Safety and Correctional Services; 2010–2011	Madeleine Meilleur
John Gerretsen	Minister of Municipal Affairs and Housing; 2010 (January–August)	Rick Bartolucci
Donna Cansfield	Minister of Transportation; 2007–2010	Kathleen Wynne
Brian Coburn	Minister of Tourism; 2003–2007; Also Responsible for Seniors	Peter Fonseca
Special Parliamentary Responsibilities
Predecessor	Title	Successor
Dwight Duncan	Government House Leader; 2005–2007	Michael Bryant

=== Wynne government ===
Bradley continued as Environment Minister in Kathleen Wynne's first cabinet after she won the leadership of the Liberal Party. Following the 2014 provincial election, the 69-year-old Bradley became a minister without portfolio with the title of Chair of Cabinet and was also appointed Deputy Government House Leader. He left cabinet in June 2016 as part of a cabinet shuffle, and later served as Chief Government Whip and Deputy Government House Leader.

In the 2018 election, Bradley lost his seat as the Liberal Party was defeated, losing official party status and suffering the greatest loss for any governing party in provincial history. He had served as St. Catharines MPP for 41 years.

Wynne ministry, Province of Ontario (2013–2018)
Cabinet posts (2)
Predecessor	Office	Successor
John Gerretsen	Chair of cabinet 2014–2016; Also Deputy Government House Leader	Deb Matthews
Wynne Government Starts	Minister of the Environment; 2013–2014	Glen Murray

=== Municipal politics ===
On July 27, 2018, the last day registration was open, Bradley registered to run for Niagara Regional Council.

Bradley was elected on October 22, 2018, finishing first out of 23 candidates with 18,954 votes.

On December 6, 2018, Bradley was selected as the Niagara Regional Chair, being elected on the first ballot receiving 19 out of 31 votes against two other candidates.

Bradley was re-elected as a regional councilor in 2022 and re-appointed regional chair on November 24, 2022.

Bradley served as the Chair of the Niagara Regional Council until his death in 2025.

== Personal life and death ==
Bradley never married and had no children. He told Steve Paikin, having observed the difficulties politicians have in balancing their careers and family life: "It was my decision and I have to live with it, so I won't complain about it," adding, "I knew politics would consume all my time, and at times I regret that. But I'm also having a direct influence on the lives of many people.”

Bradley participated in community sports as a hockey and baseball coach, manager, and referee.

In 2012, Bradley was awarded the Queen Elizabeth II Diamond Jubilee Medal.

On June 20, 2025, Bradley was awarded the King Charles III Coronation Medal.

Bradley died in St. Catharines, Ontario on September 26, 2025, at the age of 80. He had liver cancer and was in hospital since August 29, 2025, after suffering a stroke. He was unable to recover his health and decided to seek and was approved for medical assistance in dying. Prior to his death he called friends and colleagues to say goodbye and wrote a farewell statement.

Tributes in memorium were read into the record of the Legislative Assembly of Ontario on December 3, 2025.

== Electoral record ==
1977 Ontario general election
Party	Candidate	Votes	%
Liberal	Jim Bradley	12,392	38.89
Progressive Conservative	Eleanor Lancaster	11,669	36.62
New Democratic	Fred Dickson	7,556	23.71
Communist	Eric Blair	247	0.78
Total valid votes		31,864	100.00
Rejected, unmarked and declined ballots		213	
Turnout		32,077	60.91

1981 Ontario general election
Party	Candidate	Votes	%	±%
Liberal	(x)Jim Bradley	16,509	51.85	+12.96
Progressive Conservative	John Larocque	10,273	32.26	-4.36
New Democratic	Don Loucks	4,927	15.47	-8.24
Communist	Norman J. Newell	132	0.41	-0.37
Total valid votes		31,841	100.00	
Rejected, unmarked and declined ballots		181		
Turnout		32,022	57.20	

1985 Ontario general election
Party	Candidate	Votes	%	±%
Liberal	(x)Jim Bradley	20,605	57.94	+6.09
Progressive Conservative	Elaine Herzog	9,029	25.39	-6.87
New Democratic	Michael Cormier	5,624	15.81	-0.34
Communist	Eric Blair	305	0.86	+0.45
Total valid votes		35,563	100.00	
Rejected, unmarked and declined ballots		201		
Turnout		35,764	61.65	

1987 Ontario general election
Party	Candidate	Votes	%	±%
Liberal	(x)Jim Bradley	17,584	63.30	+5.36
New Democratic	Rob West	5,566	20.04	+4.23
Progressive Conservative	Chuck Bradley	4,258	15.33	-10.06
Communist	Eric Blair	369	1.33	+.29
Total valid votes		27,777	100.00	

1990 Ontario general election
Party	Candidate	Votes	%	±%
Liberal	(x)Jim Bradley	11,565	38.76	-24.54
New Democratic	Dave Kappele	10,629	35.63	+15.59
Progressive Conservative	Bruce Timms	3,926	13.16	-2.17
Confederation of Regions	Eva Longhurst	2,384	7.99	+7.99
Family Coalition	Bert Pynenburg	1,331	4.46	+4.46
Total valid votes		29,835	100.00	
Rejected, unmarked and declined ballots		337		
Turnout		30,172	66.77	

1995 Ontario general election: St. Catharines
Party	Candidate	Votes	%	±%	Expenditures
Liberal	Jim Bradley	13,761	46.53	+7.77	$33,835.95
Progressive Conservative	Archie Heide	11,486	38.84	+25.68	$36,875.32
New Democratic	Jeff Burch	3,929	13.29	−22.34	$12,043.92
Family Coalition	Jon Siemens	245	0.83	−3.63	$0.00
Natural Law	Marcy Sheremetta	153	0.52		$0.00
Total valid votes		29,574	100.00		
Rejected, unmarked and declined ballots		227	0.76		
Turnout		29,801	64.58		

1999 Ontario general election: St. Catharines
Party	Candidate	Votes	%	±%	Expenditures
Liberal	Jim Bradley	25,186	53.90	+7.37	$45,478.14
Progressive Conservative	Tom Froese	17,994	38.51	−0.33	$68,831.44
New Democratic	Gordon Coggins	2,902	6.21	−7.08	$8,286.11
Natural Law	Helene Ann Darisse	272	0.58		$0.00
Green	Douglas Woodard	215	0.46		$83.93
Independent (Marxist-Leninist)	Ron Walker	154	0.33		$112.00
Total valid votes		46,723	100.00		
Rejected, unmarked and declined ballots		336	0.71		
Turnout		47,059	59.61		
Note: percentage change in vote is calculated from 1995 results redistributed according to new riding boundaries.

2003 Ontario general election: St. Catharines
Party	Candidate	Votes	%	±%	Expenditures
Liberal	Jim Bradley	25,319	57.44	+3.54	$63,576.04
Progressive Conservative	Mark Brickell	12,932	29.34	−9.17	$72,267.48
New Democratic	John Bacher	3,944	8.95	+2.74	$8,542.84
Green	Jim Fannon	1,167	2.65	+2.19	$2,858.89
Family Coalition	Linda Klassen	714	1.62		$13.80
Total valid votes		44,076	100.00		
Rejected, unmarked and declined ballots		271	0.61		
Turnout		44,347	56.43		

2007 Ontario general election: St. Catharines
Party	Candidate	Votes	%	±%	Expenditures
Liberal	Jim Bradley	21,029	47.23	−10.21	$60,133.56
Progressive Conservative	Bruce Timms	12,864	28.89	−0.45	$33.521.98
New Democratic	Henry Bosch	7,069	15.88	+6.93	$11,300.79
Green	Byrne Smith	3,152	7.08	+4.43	$2,172.38
Family Coalition	Barra Gots	267	0.60	−1.02	$0.00
Communist	Sam Hammond	139	0.31		$826.44
Total valid votes		44,520	100.0		

2011 Ontario general election: St. Catharines
Party	Candidate	Votes	%	±%
Liberal	Jim Bradley	17,166	40.21	−7.02
Progressive Conservative	Sandy Bellows	15,461	36.21	+7.32
New Democratic	Irene Lowell	8,624	20.20	+4.32
Green	Jennifer Mooradian	1,066	2.50	−4.58
Family Coalition	Chris Clarke	191	0.45	−0.15
Communist	Saleh Waziruddin	68	0.16	−0.15
Independent	Jon Radick (Canadians' Choice)	62	0.15	
Freedom	Dave Unrau	57	0.13	
Total valid votes		42,695	100.00	
Total rejected, unmarked and declined ballots		188	0.44	
Turnout		42,883	51.00	
Eligible voters		84,078		
Liberal hold		Swing		−7.17
Source(s) Elections Ontario (2011). "Official return from the records / Rapport des registres officiels - St. Catherines" (PDF).

2014 Ontario general election: St. Catharines
Party	Candidate	Votes	%	±%
Liberal	Jim Bradley	19,070	41.00	+0.79
Progressive Conservative	Mat Siscoe	13,814	29.70	-6.51
New Democratic	Jennie Stevens	11,350	24.40	+4.20
Green	Karen Fraser	1,792	3.85	+1.35
Libertarian	Nicholas Dushko	223	0.48	
Freedom	Dave Unrau	170	0.37	+0.24
Communist	Saleh Waziruddin	95	0.20	+0.04
Total valid votes		46,514	100.0	
Source(s) "General Election Results by District, 076 St. Catharines". Elections Ontario. 2014. Archived from the original on July 8, 2014.

2018 Ontario general election: St. Catharines
Party	Candidate	Votes	%	±%	Expenditures
New Democratic	Jennie Stevens	18,911	36.61	+12.01	$8,736
Progressive Conservative	Sandie Bellows	17,353	33.60	+4.28	$41,729
Liberal	Jim Bradley	12,671	24.53	−16.67	$77,481
Green	Colin Ryrie	1,923	3.72	−0.11	$10
None of the Above	Jim Fannon	494	0.96	N/A	$27,700
Libertarian	Daniel Tisi	195	0.38	N/A	none listed
Communist	Saleh Waziruddin	66	0.13	N/A	none listed
Cultural Action	Duke Willis	37	0.07	N/A	none listed
Total valid votes		51,650	98.93		
Total rejected, unmarked and declined ballots		556	1.07		
Turnout		52,206	58.06		
Eligible voters		89,924			
New Democratic notional gain from Liberal		Swing		+14.34	
Source: Elections Ontario

St. Catharines regional council election, 2018
Candidate	Total votes	% of total votes
Jim Bradley	18,954	14.10
George Darte	12,516	9.31
Sandie Bellows	11,117	8.27
Laura Ip	9,878	7.35
Brian Heit (X)	8,499	6.32
Tim Rigby (X)	8,435	6.27
Kelly Edgar (X)	7,233	5.38
Mike Britton	6,765	5.03
Bruce Timms (X)	5,859	4.36
Haley Bateman	5,546	4.13
Mark Elliott	5,519	4.10
Rob Depetris	4,784	3.56
Mo Al Jumaily	4,105	3.05
Debbie MacGregor (X)	3,844	2.86
Emily Beth Spanton	3,421	2.54
Frank Rupcic	3,360	2.50
Peter Gill	3,247	2.42
Mary Margaret Murphy	2,763	2.06
Len Stack	2,735	2.03
Alan Caslin (X)	1,928	1.43
Lou Felice	1,476	1.10
Paul Allan	1,438	1.07
Bob Szajkowski	1,024	0.76

St. Catharines regional council election, 2022
Candidate	Total votes	% of total votes
Jim Bradley (X)	16,960	16.30
Laura Ip (X)	10,986	10.56
Haley Bateman	9,964	9.58
Peter Secord	8,150	7.83
Tim Rigby	7,915	7.61
Sal Sorrento	7,798	7.50
Brian Heit (X)	7,162	6.88
Alicia Marshall	5,850	5.62
Trecia McLennan	5,060	4.86
Sabrina Hill	4,994	4.80
Rob Herzog	4,887	4.70
Dennis Van Meer	4,082	3.92
John McGill	2,693	2.59
Matthew Bradman	2,337	2.25
Bryan Blue	2,104	2.02
Steve Borisenko	1,615	1.55
Shawn Marriott	1,478	1.42

The 1999, 2003 and 2007 expenditure entries are taken from official candidate reports as listed by Elections Ontario. The figures cited are the Total Candidate's Campaign Expenses Subject to Limitation, and include transfers from constituency associations. The 1995 expenditures are taken from an official listing of election expenses published by Elections Ontario.
