= Chris Bittle =

Canadian politician (born 1979)

Chris Bittle MP

Member of Parliament for St. Catharines
- Incumbent
- Assumed office October 19, 2015
- Preceded by: Rick Dykstra

Parliamentary Secretary to the Minister of Environment and Climate Change
- Incumbent
- Assumed office March 19, 2021
- Prime Minister: Justin Trudeau
- Preceded by: Peter Schiefke

Parliamentary Secretary to the Minister of Transport
- In office December 12, 2019 – March 19, 2021
- Prime Minister: Justin Trudeau
- Preceded by: Arnold Chan
- Succeeded by: Kirsty Duncan

Deputy Leader of the Government in the House of Commons
- In office September 19, 2017 – September 11, 2019

Personal details
- Born: Christopher Joseph Bittle; February 17, 1979 (age 47) Niagara Falls, Ontario, Canada
- Party: Liberal
- Education: University of Windsor (LL.B.); Queen's University (B.A.)
- Profession: Lawyer

Christopher Joseph Bittle MP (born February 17, 1979) is a Canadian Liberal politician who was elected to represent the riding of St. Catharines in the House of Commons of Canada in the 2015 federal election. He currently serves as the Parliamentary Secretary to the Minister of Environment and Climate Change, sitting on the Standing Committee on Environment and Sustainable Development. He previously served as Parliamentary Secretary to the Minister of Transport and as Deputy House Leader of the Government. Bittle is the youngest MP to hold the Deputy House Leader position in the House of Commons.

== Early life and career ==
Born in Niagara Falls, Bittle graduated from St. Paul Catholic Secondary School before attending Queen's University where he graduated with an Honours Bachelor of Arts degree. He then attended law school at the University of Windsor where he received a Bachelor of Laws. Before he was elected Member of Parliament, he worked at Lancaster, Brooks and Welch LLP, as a civil litigator focusing in matters like commercial disputes, real state litigation defamation, and landlord tenant matters. In addition to practicing law Bittle also served as Chair of Quest Community Health Centre, a not-for-profit Community Health Centre in St. Catharines. Bittle also worked as an instructor in the Department of Continuing Education at Niagara College and as seminar leader at Brock University.

== Political career ==
Bittle was elected as a first time Member of Parliament in October 2015. He received 24,870 votes and defeated incumbent Rick Dykstra.

In September 2017, Bittle was appointed Deputy Leader of the Government in the House of Commons, the youngest Member of Parliament to hold that position. In December 2019, he was appointed Parliamentary Secretary to the Minister of Transport, where he worked alongside Minister Marc Garneau and Minister Omar Alghabra to invest in public transit and particularly on safe travel during the COVID-19 pandemic.

In March 2021, Bittle was appointed as Parliamentary Secretary to the Minister of the Environment and Climate Change, Jonathan Wilkinson. Bittle is also a member of the Standing Committee on Environment and Sustainable Development.

Bittle was re-elected as a Member of Parliament in the 2021 Canadian federal election but with a decreased share of the vote.

In August 2022 Bittle apologized to University of Ottawa law professor Michael Geist for accusing Geist of racism during a twitter dispute.

He was elected chair of the Canadian House of Commons Standing Committee on Procedure and House Affairs in the 45th Canadian Parliament in 2025.

== Electoral record ==
2025 Canadian federal election: St. Catharines
** Preliminary results — Not yet official **
Party	Candidate	Votes	%	±%	Expenditures
Liberal	Chris Bittle	34,750	52.01	+14.14	
Conservative	Bas Sluijmers	27,011	40.43	+8.06	
New Democratic	Karen Orlandi	4,021	6.02	–15.29	
People's	Dennis Wilson	520	0.78	–5.81	
Independent	Christopher Reilly	308	0.46	N/A	
Centrist	Taha Alexander Haj-Ahmad	198	0.30	N/A	
Total valid votes/expense limit					
Total rejected ballots					
Turnout		66,808	68.95		
Eligible voters		96,896			
Liberal notional hold		Swing		+3.04	
Source: Elections Canada

2021 Canadian federal election: St. Catharines
Party	Candidate	Votes	%	±%	Expenditures
Liberal	Chris Bittle	22,069	37.59	-2.64	$63,959.39
Conservative	Krystina Waler	19,018	32.39	+0.82	$106,257.96
New Democratic	Trecia McLennon	12,294	20.94	+0.26	$13,666.86
People's	Rebecca Hahn	3,860	6.57	+5.20	$10,008.13
Green	Catharine Rhodes	1,091	1.86	-4.29	$205.19
Total valid votes/expense limit		58,332	99.36	-0.19	$118,995.79
Total rejected ballots		377	0.64	+0.19	
Turnout		58,709	64.51	-1.95	
Eligible voters		91,010			
Liberal hold		Swing		-1.70	
Source: Elections Canada

2019 Canadian federal election: St. Catharines
Party	Candidate	Votes	%	±%	Expenditures
Liberal	Chris Bittle	24,183	40.23	-2.95	$87,246.25
Conservative	Krystina Waler	18,978	31.57	-6.00	$114,133.28
New Democratic	Dennis Van Meer	12,431	20.68	+4.16	none listed
Green	Travis Mason	3,695	6.15	+3.56	$5,554.85
People's	Allan deRoo	826	1.37		none listed
Total valid votes/expense limit		60,113	99.17		
Total rejected ballots		506	0.83	+0.41	
Turnout		60,619	66.46	-1.28	
Eligible voters		91,215			
Liberal hold		Swing		+1.52	
Source: Elections Canada

2015 Canadian federal election
Party	Candidate	Votes	%	±%	Expenditures
Liberal	Chris Bittle	24,870	43.2	+22.6	–
Conservative	Rick Dykstra	21,637	37.6	-13.3	–
New Democratic	Susan Erskine-Fournier	9,511	16.5	-7.3	–
Green	Jim Fannon	1,488	2.6	-1.2	–
Communist	Saleh Waziruddin	85	0.1	-0.1	–
Total valid votes/Expense limit		57,591	100.0		$221,576.61
Total rejected ballots		243	–	–	
Turnout		57,834	–	–	
Eligible voters		84,474			
Source: Elections Canada
