= Robert Mercer Johnston =

Canadian politician

Robert M. Johnston

Member of the Ontario Parliament for St. Catharines
- In office 1967–1977
- Preceded by: New riding
- Succeeded by: Jim Bradley

52nd Mayor of St. Catharines
- In office 1964–1967
- Preceded by: Ivan Buchanan
- Succeeded by: Mackenzie Chown

Personal details
- Born: September 15, 1916; Port Dalhousie, Ontario
- Died: October 16, 1985 (aged 69); Hotel Dieu Hospital, St.Catharines, Ontario
- Political party: Progressive Conservative
- Occupation: Johnston's Coal, Ice and Fuel

Robert Mercer Johnston (September 15, 1916 – October 16, 1985) was an Ontario political figure. He represented St. Catharines in the Legislative Assembly of Ontario from 1967 to 1977 as a Progressive Conservative member.

== Background ==
Johnston was born in Port Dalhousie, Ontario, the son of Robert Henry and Lillias Johnston. In 1951, he married Doris Gardener. He was the mayor of St. Catharines.

== Politics ==
Johnston was elected mayor of St. Catharines, Ontario in 1964 defeating incumbent Ivan Buchanan. He remained mayor until he was elected to provincial office in 1967.

He was elected in the 1967 provincial election in the new riding of St. Catharines. He defeated Liberal candidate Jim Bradley by 3,948 votes. He was re-elected in 1971 and 1975. During his time in government he was a backbench supporter in the governments of John Robarts and Bill Davis. He retired from politics before the 1977 election.
