= Brian McMullan =

Brian James McMullan

Mayor of St. Catharines
- In office 2006–2014
- Preceded by: Tim Rigby
- Succeeded by: Walter Sendzik

Personal details
- Born: Hamilton, Ontario
- Website: Official website

Brian James McMullan was the mayor of St. Catharines, Ontario, Canada from 2006 to 2014. He was elected to the position in the 2006 St. Catharines municipal election. He was previously a St. Catharines city councillor and a Niagara regional councillor.

== Early life and career ==
McMullan was born in Hamilton and raised in the Niagara region. He has a degree from Brock University, and is the vice-president of Hanna Paper Recycling. He is a former chairman of the Recycling Council of Ontario, and worked to establish Ontario's blue box recycling program.

== Political career ==
McMullan served on St. Catharines City Council from 1988 to 1997, representing the Grantham ward. He was elected to the Niagara Regional Council in 2000. During that time, McMullan co-chaired the region's Smart Growth Smarter Niagara Steering Committee.

His bid for re-election in 2003 failed, but he was elected mayor of St. Catharines by a significant margin in 2006.

During the 2006 campaign, McMullan pledged to eliminate automatic property tax raises based on increased property assessments and to implement a "zero-based budget" with mandatory reviews for all city expenditures. He also opposed the existing plans for tower development at Port Dalhousie.

On November 29, 2009, McMullan announced his intention to seek re-election in 2010. He was re-elected in October 2010.

On April 1, 2014, McMullan announced that he would not be seeking re-election in the October 27 municipal election.
