= Tim Rigby (politician) =

Canadian politician

Mayor of St. Catharines, Ontario
- In office 1997–2006
- Preceded by: Alan Unwin
- Succeeded by: Brian McMullan

Timothy H. Rigby is a politician in Ontario, Canada. He served as mayor of St. Catharines from 1997 to 2006, and is currently a Niagara regional councillor.

Rigby is an insurance broker in private life, and was a partner with the Rose, Horne and Stevenson Group from 1979 to 1997. He has also been active in the sports community, serving as the president of Rowing Canada and leading a successful drive for St. Catharines to host the 1999 World Rowing Championships. In 1996, he was inducted into the St. Catharines Sports Hall of Fame.

Rigby was endorsed by outgoing Mayor Alan Unwin in 1997, and defeated city councillor Rick Dykstra by a significant margin. As mayor of St. Catharines, Rigby received an automatic position on the Niagara Regional Council. He was re-elected without opposition in 2000. He has tried to reduce St. Catharines's traditional dependence on industry, and to permit diversification in the high-tech sector. He nonetheless joined with other southern Ontario mayors to seek federal and provincial assistance for Canada's automotive sector in 2002.

He was narrowly re-elected in 2003, defeating rival candidate Wendy Patriquin by 54 votes. Rigby was 63 years old during this campaign.

Rigby supported the 2005 merger of Hamilton Hydro Inc. and St. Catharines Hydro Utility Services Inc., which created the third-largest electricity distribution company in Ontario. He has also given support in principle to plans for a ferry service from St. Catharines to Toronto. In June 2006, he led council in approving a controversial seventeen-storey condominium in the Port Dalhousie waterfront area.

On April 25, 2006, Rigby announced that he would not seek a fourth term as mayor. He instead sought direct election to the Niagara Regional Council, and was narrowly defeated for the sixth and final regional seat in St. Catharines. He was, however, appointed to Regional Council as St. Catharines' sixth representative, replacing Peter Partington, who will serve as regional chair.

== Electoral record ==
2006 St. Catharines municipal election: Niagara Regional Councillor (six elected)
Candidate	Votes	%
(x)Judy Casselman	18,666	13.71
(x)Peter Partington	16,771	12.32
(x)Michael R. Collins	16,416	12.06
(x)Brian Heit	16,273	11.95
(x)Bruce Timms	15,473	11.37
(x)Ronna Katzman	13,846	10.17
(x)Tim Rigby	13,137	9.65
N. Carlos Garcia	10,301	7.57
Rob Hesp	8,145	5.98
Bart Brouwer	7,091	5.21
Total valid votes	136,119	100.00

Electors could vote for six candidates.
Percentages are determined in relation to the total number of votes.

2003 St. Catharines municipal election: Mayor
Candidate	Votes	%
(x)Tim Rigby	9,558	31.81
Wendy Patriquin	9,504	31.63
Rondi Craig	9,189	30.59
Mark Klimchuk	1,166	3.88
Burt Koiter	415	1.38
Boris Petrovici	212	0.71
Total valid votes	30,044	100.00

2000 St. Catharines municipal election: Mayor
Candidate	Votes	%
(x)Tim Rigby	acclaimed	-

1997 St. Catharines municipal election: Mayor
Candidate	Votes	%
Tim Rigby	14,193	42.32
Rick Dykstra	11,181	33.34
Tom Derreck	8,162	24.34
Total valid votes	33,536	100.00

The 2003 results are taken from the City of St. Catharines website, available here. The 1997 results are taken from the Hamilton Spectator, 11 November 1997, B9. The final official results were not significantly different.
