= List of mayors of St. Catharines =

This is a list of mayors of St. Catharines, Ontario.

== Mayors ==
Mayor		Term began	Term ended	Ref
1	Alpheus Spencer St. John	1845	1845	
2	Elias Smith Adams	1846	1849	
3	Bernard Foley	1850	1850	
4	Eleazer Williams Stephenson	1851	1852	
(2)	Elias Smith Adams	1852	1859	
5	James Currie	1860	1862	
6	William McGiverin	1863	1863	
7	William Morgan Eccles	1864	1865	
8	Thomas Burns	1866	1868	
(5)	James Currie	1869	1870	
9	Patrick Marren	1871	1871	
10	Henry Haight Collier	1872	1873	
11	James Norris	1874	1874	
12	James A. Douglas	1875	1876	
13	Calvin Ernest Brown	1876	1877	
14	Lucius Sterne Oille	1878	1878	
15	Henry Carlisle	1879	1881	
16	Patrick Larkin	1882	1883	
17	Roswell Hinman Smith	1884	1884	
18	Henry Albert King	1885	1886	
19	John Evers Cuffe	1887	1888	
20	John Brewer McIntyre	1889	1890	
21	Edwin Goodman	1891	1892	
22	Donald Robertson	1893	1894	
23	John Charles Rykert	1895	1896	
24	William Beamer Gilleland	1897	1898	
25	Michael Yates Keating	1899	1900	
(20)	John Brewer McIntyre	1901	1902	
26	William Bartlett Burgoyne	1903	1903	
27	Alexander William Marquis	1904	1904	
28	Theodore Sweet	1905	1905	
29	Andrew Riddell	1906	1907	
30	John Samuel Campbell	1908	1909	
31	James Maitland McBride	1910	1911	
32	William Hamilton Merritt	1912	1913	
33	James Thomas Petrie	1914	1915	
(26)	William Bartlett Burgoyne	1916	1917	
34	James Alexander Wiley	1918	1918	
35	John Melbourne Elson	1919	1919	
36	Edwin John Lovelace	1920	1921	
37	Edwin Cyrus Graves	1922	1922	
(36)	Edwin John Lovelace	Jan 1923	Apr 1923	
38	Howard Eugene Rose	Apr 1923	Dec 1923	
39	Jacob Smith	1924	1927	
40	John David Wright	1928	1929	
41	Frank McCordick	1930	1931	
42	Frederick Avery	1932	1934	
43	Norman Lockhart	1935	1935	
44	Walter Westwood	1936	1936	
(40)	John David Wright	1937	1938	
45	Charles Daley	1939	1943	
46	William John Macdonald	1943	1948	
47	Richard Robertson	1949	1951	
48	John Franklin	1952	1953	
49	John Smith	1954	1957	
(48)	Arthur Franklin	1958	1958	
50	Wilfrid Bald	1959	1960	
51	Ivan Buchanan	1961	1964	
52	Robert Mercer Johnston	1965	1968	
53	Mackenzie Chown	1968	1972	
54	Joseph Reid	1973	1976	
55	Roy Adams	1976	1985	
56	Joe McCaffery	1985	1994	
57	Alan Unwin	1994	1997	
58	Tim Rigby	1997	2006	
59	Brian McMullan	2006	2014	
60	Walter Sendzik	2014	2022	
61	Mat Siscoe	2022	present	
