= Alan Unwin =

Canadian politician (1941/1942–2024)

Alan Lawrence Unwin (1941/1942 – May 10, 2024) was a Canadian politician in Ontario. He served as Mayor of St. Catharines from 1994 to 1997.

== Life and career ==
Unwin served as principal at Carlton School and Ferndale School in St. Catharines (Toronto Star, 20 October 1987; Hamilton Spectator, 28 June 1994). He also chaired the St. Catharines Transit Commission in the mid-1980s (Globe and Mail, 23 March 1985).

In late 1994, he was elected mayor, winning election in a crowded field of nine candidates (Toronto Star, 13 October 1997). He attempted to ban lap dancing in the city, and strongly opposed a 1995 court decision which legalized the practice (Winnipeg Free Press, 9 December 1995). He attended a rally for the Reform Party in May 1997, in which party leader Preston Manning called for federal prisoners to be stripped of their voting rights (Kitchener-Waterloo Record, 16 May 1997). (It may be noted that Paul Bernardo and Karla Homolka, two of Canada's most notorious killers, are former residents of St. Catharines. It is not clear if Unwin actually endorsed the Reform Party.)

Unwin also became chairman for the Ontario urban mayors caucus in 1997, during negotiations with the provincial government of Mike Harris on the cost of service downloads. He criticized Harris for refusing to meet with them directly (Hamilton Spectator, 18 July 1997), and claimed that cities were not given enough information to plan their budgets for the following year (Globe and Mail, 8 October 1997).

Unwin did not seek re-election in 1997 (Hamilton Spectator, 11 November 1997). He endorsed Tim Rigby's successful campaign to succeed him as mayor.

Unwin died on May 10, 2024, at the age of 82.
