= Peter Partington =

Canadian politician

Chair of the Niagara Regional Council
- In office 2003–2010
- Preceded by: Debbie Zimmerman
- Succeeded by: Gary Burroughs

Ontario MPP
- In office 1985–1987
- Preceded by: Bob Welch
- Succeeded by: Mike Dietsch
- Constituency: Brock

Personal details
- Born: September 9, 1939 (age 86) St. Catharines, Ontario
- Party: Progressive Conservative
- Spouse: Betsy
- Children: 2
- Occupation: Lawyer

Peter Partington (born September 9, 1939) is a former politician in Ontario, Canada. He was a Progressive Conservative member of the Legislative Assembly of Ontario from 1985 to 1987 who represented the Niagara region riding Brock. He later served as chair of the Niagara Regional Council from 2003 to 2010.

== Background ==
Partington was born in St. Catharines, Ontario. He has a Bachelor of Arts degree and a law degree from the University of Western Ontario. He practiced as a barrister and solicitor before entering political life. Partington was called to the bar in 1965, and was appointed Queen's Counsel in 1976.

== Politics ==
=== Provincial ===
He was elected to the Ontario legislature in the 1985 provincial election, defeating Liberal Party candidate Bill Andres in the electoral district of Brock. The Progressive Conservatives won a narrow minority government in this election, and Partington briefly served as a backbench supporter of Frank Miller's administration before the PCs were defeated in the house. In opposition, he served as his party's critic for the Solicitor General and Municipal Affairs.

He was defeated in the 1987 election, losing to Liberal candidate Mike Dietsch in a Liberal sweep of the province.

1985 Ontario general election
| Party | Candidate | Votes | % | ±% |
|---|---|---|---|---|
| Progressive Conservative | Peter Partington | 9,741 | 41.6 | -7.2 |
| Liberal | Bill Andres | 9,081 | 38.7 | +6.5 |
| New Democratic | Robert Woolston | 5,624 | 16.5 | -2.9 |
| Green | Brian Dolby | 755 | 3.2 | – |
| Total valid votes | | 23,444 | 100.00 | |

1987 Ontario general election
| Party | Candidate | Votes | % | ±% |
|---|---|---|---|---|
| Liberal | Mike Dietsch | 10,822 | 41.4 | +2.6 |
| Progressive Conservative | (x)Peter Partington | 8,821 | 33.7 | -7.8 |
| New Democratic | Christel Haeck | 6,514 | 14.9 | +8.9 |
| Total valid votes | | 27,777 | 100.00 | |

=== Niagara Regional Council ===
Partington was elected to the Niagara Regional Council in 1994, and became its chair in 2003. He was director of the Association of Municipalities of Ontario in 1999–2000, and served as director and president of the Ontario Great Lakes Foundation from 2000 to 2003. He was re-elected to a fifth term in the 2006 municipal election and was acclaimed to the position of Regional Chair for the 2006–2010 term.

In January 2010, Partington announced he would not be seeking re-election to Niagara Regional Council in the 2010 municipal elections. He gave his final state-of the region address in April 2010.
