= Jennie Stevens =

Canadian politician

Jennie Stevens MPP
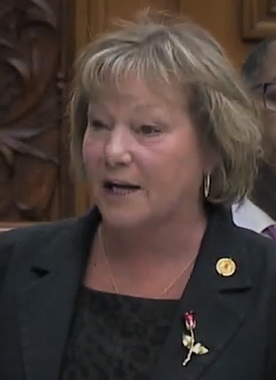
- Stevens in 2020

Critic, Veterans, Legions and Military Affairs
- Incumbent
- Assumed office August 23, 2018
- Leader: Andrea Horwath

Member of the Ontario Provincial Parliament for St. Catharines
- Incumbent
- Assumed office June 7, 2018
- Preceded by: Jim Bradley

St. Catharines City Councillor
- In office December 1, 2003 – June 2018
- Preceded by: James Almas & Wendy Patriquin
- Succeeded by: Greg Miller & Lori Littleton
- Constituency: Merritton Ward

Personal details
- Party: New Democratic

Jennifer Stevens is a Canadian politician, who was elected to the Legislative Assembly of Ontario in the 2018 provincial election. She represents the riding of St. Catharines as a member of the Ontario New Democratic Party. Prior to her election in the legislature, she was a city councillor for 15 years for St. Catharines City Council.

== Background ==
Stevens has a background in the not-for profit sector, serving on the board of the Niagara Folk Arts Multicultural Centre. She also served on the Merritton Athletic Association.

== Political career ==
Stevens' political career began in municipal politics. She served as city councillor for 15 years, for St. Catharines City Council, representing Merritton Ward (Ward 1), located in the city's southeast. Stevens' first foray into provincial politics was in the 2014 Ontario general election, where she was unsuccessful against Liberal incumbent Jim Bradley. In the 2018 Ontario general election, Stevens defeated Bradley, becoming the first woman to represent St. Catharines in the legislature.

In April 2021, Stevens introduced a private member's bill titled Bill 274, Intimate Partner Violence Disclosure Act. The bill was based on Clare's Law, and sought to provide additional protections for individuals at-risk of domestic violence. Bill 274 was defeated in a vote the same month; after the Progressive Conservatives voted against it.

Stevens was re-elected in the 2022 Ontario general election, defeating Progressive Conservative candidate and St. Catharines city councillor Sal Sorrento.

As of August 11, 2024, she serves as the Official Opposition critic for Sports, Tourism, and for Veterans, Legions, and Military Affairs.

In October 2024, Stevens introduced a bill known as Bill 213, Affordable Home Heating Act. The bill proposed creating a Heating Support Program to assist low-income seniors and families with the costs of heating their homes during the winter. On December 9, the bill was defeated.

In 2024, she advocated for increased supports for homeless veterans. Stevens stated that the number of homeless veterans was growing, and that they were having difficulties accessing government assistance.

== Electoral record ==
2025 Ontario general election: St. Catharines
Party	Candidate	Votes	%	±%	Expenditures
New Democratic	Jennie Stevens	19,688	42.12	+2.41	$66,956
Progressive Conservative	Sal Sorrento	16,422	35.13	+0.70	$73,420
Liberal	Robin McPherson	8,092	17.31	+0.68	$72,064
Green	Stephen Vincelette-Smith	1,033	2.21	–1.88	$567
New Blue	Rob Atalick	807	1.73	–0.83	$4,178
Stop the New Sex-Ed Agenda	Natalia Benoit	347	0.74	N/A	$0
Ontario Party	Liz Leeuwenburg	300	0.64	–0.78	$0
Ontario Alliance	J. Justin O'Donnell	56	0.12	+0.05	
Total valid votes/expense limit		46,745	99.28	–0.20	$151,984
Total rejected, unmarked, and declined ballots		340	0.72	+0.20	
Turnout		47,085	50.22	+3.56	
Eligible voters		93,754			
New Democratic hold		Swing		+0.86	
Source: Elections Ontario

2022 Ontario general election: St. Catharines
Party	Candidate	Votes	%	±%	Expenditures
New Democratic	Jennie Stevens	17,128	39.71	+3.09	$72,978
Progressive Conservative	Sal Sorrento	14,851	34.43	+0.83	$68,299
Liberal	Ryan Madill	7,175	16.63	–7.90	$78,102
Green	Michele Braniff	1,764	4.09	+0.37	$25
New Blue	Keith McDonald	1,103	2.56	N/A	$15
Ontario Party	Michael Goddard	613	1.42	N/A	none listed
Libertarian	Judi Falardeau	372	0.86	+0.48	none listed
Communist	Rin Simon	99	0.23	+0.10	none listed
Ontario Alliance	J. Justin O'Donnell	31	0.07	N/A	$0
Total valid votes		43,136	99.48	+0.55	
Total rejected, unmarked, and declined ballots		224	0.52	–0.55	
Turnout		43,360	46.66	–11.40	
Eligible voters		93,002			
New Democratic hold		Swing		+1.13	
Source(s): "Summary of Valid Votes Cast for Each Candidate" (PDF). Elections Ontario. 2022. Archived from the original on 2023-05-18.; "Statistical Summary by Electoral District" (PDF). Elections Ontario. 2022. Archived from the original on 2023-05-21.; "Political Financing and Party Information". Elections Ontario.

2018 Ontario general election: St. Catharines
Party	Candidate	Votes	%	±%	Expenditures
New Democratic	Jennie Stevens	18,911	36.61	+12.01	$8,736
Progressive Conservative	Sandie Bellows	17,353	33.60	+4.28	$41,729
Liberal	Jim Bradley	12,671	24.53	−16.67	$77,481
Green	Colin Ryrie	1,923	3.72	−0.11	$10
None of the Above	Jim Fannon	494	0.96	N/A	$27,700
Libertarian	Daniel Tisi	195	0.38	N/A	none listed
Communist	Saleh Waziruddin	66	0.13	N/A	none listed
Cultural Action	Duke Willis	37	0.07	N/A	none listed
Total valid votes		51,650	98.93		
Total rejected, unmarked and declined ballots		556	1.07		
Turnout		52,206	58.06		
Eligible voters		89,924			
New Democratic notional gain from Liberal		Swing		+3.87	
Source: Elections Ontario

2014 Ontario general election: St. Catharines
Party	Candidate	Votes	%	±%
Liberal	Jim Bradley	19,070	41.93	+0.72
Progressive Conservative	Mat Siscoe	13,814	29.72	-6.49
New Democratic	Jennie Stevens	11,350	24.45	+4.25
Green	Karen Fraser	1,792	3.85	+1.35
Libertarian	Nicholas Dushko	223	0.47	
Freedom	Dave Unrau	170	0.37	+0.24
Communist	Saleh Waziruddin	95	0.21	+0.05
Total valid votes		46,514	100.0	
Rejected, unmarked and declined ballots		725	1.56	
Turnout		47,239	54.80	
Total Registered Electors on List		86,198		
Liberal hold		Swing		+3.60
Source: Elections Ontario

=== 2014 St. Catharines City Council Election - Ward 1 - Merriton ===
Candidate	Total votes	% of total vote
Jennie Stevens (X)	2,423	27.32%
David Haywood	1,557	17.56%
Brandon Curie	1,092	12.31%
Leslie Seaborne	1,023	11.54%
Marta Liddiard	676	7.62%
Geoffrey Black	311	3.51%
Total valid votes	8,868	100.00

=== 2010 St. Catharines City Council Election - Ward 1 - Merriton ===
Candidate	Total votes	% of total vote
Jennie Stevens (X)	2,294	32.96%
Jeff Burch (X)	2,064	29.66%
David Haywood	1,134	16.29%
Garry Robbins	817	11.74%
Sam Sacco	491	7.05%
Cameron Alderdice	160	2.30%
Total valid votes	6,960	100.00

=== 2006 St. Catharines City Council Election - Ward 1 - Meritton ===
Candidate	Total votes	% of total vote
Jeff Burch	2857	33.01%
Jennie Stevens (X)	2849	32.92%
Sheila Morra (X)	2049	23.68%
Robbie Craine	899	10.39%
Total valid votes	6,960	100.00

=== 2003 St. Catharines City Council Election - Ward 1 - Merriton ===
Candidate	Total votes	% of total votes
Sheila Morra	1615	21.12%
Jennie Stevens	1528	19.98%
Mike O'Leary	1326	17.34%
John Anderson	830	10.85%
Jack Wallace	533	6.97%
Matthew Bell	523	6.84%
Robbie Craine	410	5.36%
George Goff	371	4.85%
Jim Fannon	230	3.01%
Jonathon Inkol	159	2.08%
Fely Ante Whitfield	123	1.61%
Total valid votes	7,648	100.00

=== 2000 St. Catharines City Council Election - Ward 1 - Merriton ===
Candidate	Total votes	% of total votes
James Almas	2,589	37.17%
Wendy Patriquin	2,060	29.57%
Jennie Stevens	1,711	24.56%
George Goff	606	8.70%
Total valid votes	6,966	100.00
