= St. Catharines City Council =

St. Catharines City Council is the governing body of the City of St. Catharines, Ontario, Canada.

The council consists of the mayor plus twelve elected councillors, with two councilors representing each of the six municipal wards. A deputy mayor is selected from among the city councillors who serves as acting mayor in the absence of the mayor.

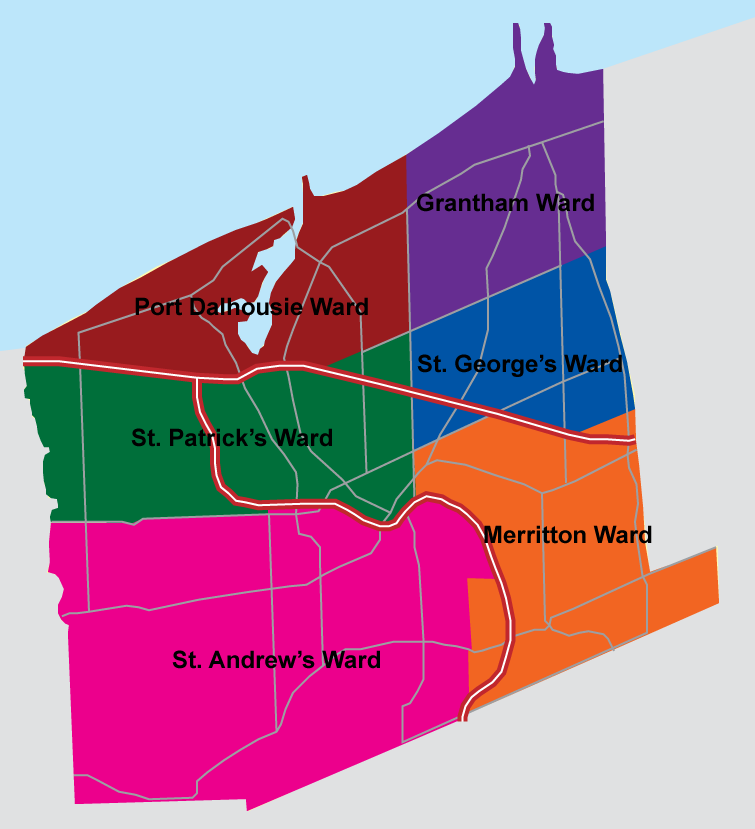
The Six Municipal Wards of St. Catharines

== Council ==
As of the 2022 Niagara Region municipal elections#St. Catharines

Mayor

- Mat Siscoe

Merriton Ward

- Jackie Lindal
- Greg Miller

St. Andrew's Ward

- Matthew Harris
- Joseph Kushner

St. George's Ward

- Mark Stevens
- Kevin Townsend

St. Patrick's Ward

- Caleb Ratzlaff
- Robin McPherson

Grantham Ward

- Dawn Dodge
- Bill Phillips

Port Dalhousie Ward

- Carlos Garcia (died December 9, 2024)
- Marty Marko (elected April 14, 2025)
- Bruce Williamson

== See also ==
- Niagara Regional Council
