= Niagara Regional Council =

The Niagara Regional Council is the governing body of the Regional Municipality of Niagara in Ontario, Canada. Council meets at Niagara Region Headquarters in Thorold, Ontario.

The council is composed of a regional chair, the 12 mayors of the constituent municipalities, and 18 regional councillors, all elected to 4-year terms.

The regional chair of the Niagara Regional Council is not directly elected by the residents, but rather chosen by the council members themselves. While any eligible voter in the region can be considered for the position, the regional policy typically selects the chair from among the 30 council members elected in the previous municipal elections. Once chosen, the regional chair must relinquish their seat as a municipal councillor, triggering a process for the municipality to fill the vacancy. Former Ontario cabinet minister Jim Bradley was regional chair from December 2018 until his death on September 26, 2025.

== History ==
On January 25, 2024, 18 deputants were slated to speak to request that the council be lit in the colours of the Palestinian flag in solidarity with community members who had loved ones killed in Gaza. The delegations were prevented when a motion brought forth by Laura Ip and Mat Siscoe to prevent them from speaking was passed. In response, members watching began to chant "Ceasefire Now!" which resulted in council calling a recess and escorting members out.

On July 25, 2024, Niagara Regional Council passed a motion banning the display of signage within the council chambers following a months long spectacle with pro-Palestinian supporters in which the council refused to light the chambers in the colours of the Palestinian flag as was done for Israel. In response, Christine Van Geyn, litigation director for the Canadian Constitution Foundation described the measure as unconstitutional and highly vulnerable to litigation.

In 2026, Bob Gale resigned as chair after it was revealed that he had a signed copy of Mein Kampf.

== Council members ==
Councillor	Notes
Vacant	Chair and CEO
Wayne Redekop	Mayor, Fort Erie
Tom Insinna	Councillor, Fort Erie
Jeff Jordan	Mayor, Grimsby
Michelle Seaborn	Councillor, Grimsby
Sandra Easton	Mayor, Lincoln
Robert Foster	Councillor, Lincoln
Jim Diodati	Mayor, Niagara Falls
Kim Craitor	Councillor, Niagara Falls
Barbara Greenwood	Councillor, Niagara Falls
Joyce Morocco	Councillor, Niagara Falls
Gary Zalepa	Lord Mayor, Niagara-on-the-Lake
Andrea Kaiser	Councillor, Niagara-on-the-Lake
Marvin Junkin	Mayor, Pelham
Wayne Olson	Councillor, Pelham
Bill Steele	Mayor, Port Colborne
Vance Badawey	Councillor, Port Colborne
Mat Siscoe	Mayor, St. Catharines
Haley Bateman	Councillor, St. Catharines
Brian Heit	Councillor, St. Catharines
Laura Ip	Councillor, St. Catharines
Peter Secord	Councillor, St. Catharines
Tim Rigby	Councillor, St. Catharines
Sal Sorrento	Councillor, St. Catharines
Terry Ugulini	Mayor, Thorold
Tim Whalen	Councillor, Thorold
Brian Grant	Mayor, Wainfleet
Frank Campion	Mayor, Welland
Pat Chiocchio	Councillor, Welland
Leanna Villella	Councillor, Welland
Cheryl Ganann	Mayor, West Lincoln
Albert Witteveen	Councillor, West Lincoln
