= Results of the 1995 Ontario general election by riding =

Candidates of the 1995 Ontario general election
- June 8, 1995

The following are the results by riding (electoral district) of the 1995 Ontario general election, that was held on June 8, 1995.

== Constituency results ==
=== Ottawa-Carleton ===
Electoral district	Candidates						Incumbent
Electoral district	NDP	Liberal	PC	Green	Natural Law	Other	Incumbent
Carleton	Cathy Hallessey; 4,046	Sam Spataro; 9,743	Norm Sterling; 28,349		Richard Beecroft; 265	Janne Jardine-Campbell (FCP); 942; Barbara Rowe (Lbt); 293	Norm Sterling
Carleton East	Fiona Faucher; 4,783	Gilles Morin; 17,780	Jeff Slater; 13,571		Ian Campbell; 758		Gilles Morin
Nepean	John Sullivan; 3,274	Hans Daigeler; 13,575	John Baird; 17,510	Frank de Jong; 390	Brian Jackson; 259	Cathy Frampton (F); 252	Hans Daigeler
Ottawa Centre	Evelyn Gigantes; 9,438	Richard Patten; 11,150	Chris Thomson; 6,715	Andrew Van Iterson; 349	Ron Parker; 365	Malek Khouri (Comm); 210; John Turmel (Abol.); 173	Evelyn Gigantes
Ottawa East	David Dyment; 4,818	Bernard Grandmaitre; 14,436	Cynthia Bled; 5,368	Larry Tyldsley; 335	Robert Mayer; 261	Steven White (Abol.); 136	Bernard Grandmaitre
Ottawa–Rideau	Dan McIntyre; 4,138	Yvonne O'Neill; 13,273	Garry Guzzo; 14,796	Lenora Burke; 412	Richard Wolfson; 178		Yvonne O'Neill
Ottawa South	Margaret Armstrong; 4,235	Dalton McGuinty; 15,418	Linda Thom; 8,618	Karen Fyson; 383	Wayne Foster; 245		Dalton McGuinty
Ottawa West	Karim Ismaili; 3,718	Bob Chiarelli; 14,516	Greg Joy; 12,898	Stephen Johns; 448	Stan Lamothe; 96	Andy Sammon (Ind); 241	Bob Chiarelli

=== Eastern Ontario ===
Electoral district	Candidates					Incumbent
Electoral district	NDP	Liberal	PC	Natural Law	Other	Incumbent
Cornwall	Syd Gardiner; 1,719	John Cleary; 14,507	Keith Clingen; 7,838	Bernise Featherstone; 236		John Cleary
Frontenac—Addington	Fred Wilson; 7,302	Peter Walker; 10,249	Bill Vankoughnet; 12,211	William Overall; 121	Laurie Greenidge (FCP); 1404; Ross Baker (Ind); 416	Fred Wilson
Hastings—Peterborough	Elmer Buchanan; 8,328	Barb Jinkerson; 4,056	Harry Danford; 16,187	David Hetherington; 308	John Westen (FCP); 1,002	Elmer Buchanan
Kingston and the Islands	Gary Wilson; 8,052	John Gerretsen; 10,314	Sally Barnes; 8,571	Ronald Dunphy; 155	John Pacheco (FCP); 858	Gary Wilson
Lanark-Renfrew	Don Page; 3,455	June Timmons; 9,956	Leo Jordan; 19,959	Rick Alexander; 237	Murray Reid (CoR); 867; Kilian O'Donovan (FCP); 745; Mike Dubroy (Ind); 557	Leo Jordan
Leeds–Grenville	Charles Stewart; 2,316	Peter McKenna; 8,955	Bob Runciman; 21,763		Peter Bevan-Baker (G); 927; Phillip Blancher (Ind); 438	Bob Runciman
Prescott and Russell	Yves Deschamps; 4,472	Jean-Marc Lalonde; 24,808	Pierre Leduc; 13,637	Pierrette Blondin; 446	Jean-Serge Brisson (Lbt); 626; John MacKinnon (Ind); 564	Jean Poirier
Prince Edward—Lennox	Paul Johnson; 5,996	Robert Gentile; 7,798	Gary Fox; 14,144		Kenn Hineman (CoR); 571	Paul Johnson
Quinte	Barb Dolan; 3,743	George Zegouras; 11,826	Doug Rollins; 13,961			Hugh O'Neil
Renfrew North	Ish Theilheimer; 2,483	Sean Conway; 16,044	Dan Callaghan; 9,681	Andre Giardano; 187	Stan Callaghan (FCP); 1,695	Sean Conway
Stormont—Dundas—Glengarry and East Grenville	Michael Cowley-Owen; 2,285	Denis Sabourin; 7,594	Noble Villeneuve; 18,884	Andrew Featherstone; 428		Noble Villeneuve

=== Central Ontario ===
Electoral district	Candidates					Incumbent
Electoral district	NDP	Liberal	PC	FCP	Other	Incumbent
Bruce	Robert Emerson; 4,269	Bruce Lauckner; 11,004	Barb Fisher; 13,680	John Clark; 2,787	Catherine Young (G); 296	Vacant
Dufferin—Peel	Sandra Crane; 3,470	Mavis Wilson; 8,501	David Tilson; 23,239			David Tilson
Grey—Owen Sound	Greg Cooper; 3,413	Everett Hall; 8,262	Bill Murdoch; 25,138	David Black; 2,082	Michael Schmidt (Ind); 703; Ian Roberts (NLP); 170	Bill Murdoch
Muskoka–Georgian Bay	Dan Waters; 7,742	Ken Black; 8,095	Bill Grimmett; 17,864		Michael Fenton (G); 411; Bill Ogilvie (Ind); 381	Dan Waters
Northumberland	Murray Weppler; 4,539	Joan Fawcett; 13,233	Doug Galt; 19,359			Joan Fawcett
Peterborough	Jenny Carter; 7,581	Sylvia Sutherland; 10,326	Gary Stewart; 22,735	Paul Morgan; 2,064	Vic Watts (Lbt); 251; Peter Leggat (NLP); 213	Jenny Carter
Simcoe Centre	Paul Wessenger; 7,655	Bruce Owen; 12,061	Joe Tascona; 29,790	Susane MacPhee-Manning; 769	Richard Warman (G); 580; Les Barnett (Ind); 284	Paul Wessenger
Simcoe East	Marg Ducie; 4,849	Ralph Cipolla; 9,044	Al McLean; 23,489		Allan MacDonald (Ind); 876; Siggy Lamothe (NLP); 266	Al McLean
Simcoe West	Kathy Simpson; 4,937	Jamie Shortt; 5,499	Jim Wilson; 24,346	James Gault; 894		Jim Wilson
Victoria—Haliburton	Cathy Vainio; 4,210	Sharon McCrae; 6,280	Chris Hodgson; 25,267	James Medd; 378	Brad Bradamore (Ind); 643; Charles Olito (CoR); 51	Chris Hodgson

=== Durham and York Region ===
Electoral district	Candidates				Incumbent
Electoral district	NDP	Liberal	PC	Other	Incumbent
Durham Centre	Drummond White; 8,120	Allan Furlong; 9,808	Jim Flaherty; 25,107		Drummond White
Durham East	Gord Mills; 8,519	Mary Novak; 6,512	John O'Toole; 24,303		Gord Mills
Durham West	Jim Wiseman; 9,444	Joe Dickson; 13,974	Janet Ecker; 29,232	Neil Fonseka (Ind); 904	Jim Wiseman
Durham—York	Larry O'Connor; 8,048	David Marquis; 7,512	Julia Munro; 25,018	Vincent Artymko (FCP); 845	Larry O'Connor
Markham	Mike Tang; 7,779	Khalid Usman; 10,770	David Tsubouchi; 37,314	Pat Redmond (FCP); 1,088; Stephen Porter (NLP); 626	Vacant
Oshawa	Allan Pilkey; 8,450	Linda Porritt; 5,666	Jerry Ouellette; 16,793		Allan Pilkey
York Centre	Joseph Thevarkunnel; 6,698	Mario Ferri; 29,150	Al Palladini; 37,897		Greg Sorbara
York—Mackenzie	Susan Wakeling; 3,611	Charles Beer; 13,973	Frank Klees; 25,904	Stefan Slovak (FCP); 498; Christopher Ball (G); 425	Charles Beer

=== Scarborough ===
Electoral district	Candidates					Incumbent
Electoral district	NDP	Liberal	PC	Natural Law	Other	Incumbent
Scarborough—Agincourt	Christine Fei; 4,112	Gerry Phillips; 13,472	Keith MacNab; 11,337	Daphne Quance; 313		Gerry Phillips
Scarborough Centre	Steve Owens; 6,841	Mary Ellen Pimblett; 7,163	Dan Newman; 12,717	Eleanor Hyodo; 349	John Brereton (Ind); 649	Steve Owens
Scarborough East	Bob Frankford; 7,212	Bhagat Taggar; 7,197	Steve Gilchrist; 19,166	Jim Hill; 234	Sam Apelbaum (Lbt); 319; Neville Berry (Ind); 270	Bob Frankford
Scarborough—Ellesmere	David Warner; 7,906	Kris Parthiban; 5,602	Marilyn Mushinski; 13,282	Daniele Belair; 202	James MacLeod (CoR); 745	David Warner
Scarborough North	Tarek Fatah; 6,431	Alvin Curling; 15,507	Mike Thomas; 10,508	Fred Fredeen; 239	Paul Blair (F); 601; Rina Morra (FCP); 369	Alvin Curling
Scarborough West	Anne Swarbrick; 9,216	John Marchildon; 5,326	Jim Brown; 11,773	Cynthia Marchand; 387	Frank Meyers (Ref); 254; George Dance (Lbt); 214; Eric Stark (G); 129	Anne Swarbrick

=== North York and East York ===
Electoral district	Candidates						Incumbent
Electoral district	NDP	Liberal	PC	Green	Natural Law	Other	Incumbent
Don Mills	Janaki Bala-Krishnan; 4,569	Richard Gosling; 7,607	David Johnson; 14,897		Lawrence Corp; 231	David Pengelly (F); 253; Mario Riberio (Ind); 243; Lee Wildgen (Ind); 119	David Johnson
Downsview	Anthony Perruzza; 8,782	Annamarie Castrilli; 9,142	Frank Ellis; 4,444	Tiina Leivo; 217		Donato De Dominicis (Ind); 572	Anthony Perruzza
Lawrence	Donato Santeramo; 5,000	Joseph Cordiano; 11,784	Emilia Valentini; 7,955	Eric Saumur; 246	Roy Anderson; 698		Joseph Cordiano
Oriole	David Cox; 3,665	Elinor Caplan; 11,164	Paul Sutherland; 10,130	Don Roebuck; 115	Donna Anderson; 227	Bernadette Michael (Ind); 243	Elinor Caplan
Willowdale	Julie McCrea; 4,825	Les Scheininger; 9,870	Charles Harnick; 18,834	Laura Weinberg; 386	Michael Beifuss; 253	Frank Zeppieri (Ind); 715	Charles Harnick
Wilson Heights	Claudia White; 4,612	Monte Kwinter; 12,468	Sam Pasternack; 9,772	Tom Salsberg; 303	Mike Dubinsky; 438	Dan Largy (FCP); 231; David Yates (Ref); 109	Monte Kwinter
York East	Gary Malkowski; 9,526	Steve Mastoras; 7,398	John Parker; 12,789		Marilyn Pepper; 243	Steve Kotsopoulos (Ind); 497; John Richardson (Ind); 251	Gary Malkowski
York Mills	Lesley Durham; 2,930	David MacNaughton; 7,318	David Turnbull; 18,852	Marion Wyse; 157	Debbie Weberg; 173	Mark Meschino (Lbt); 223	David Turnbull
Yorkview	Giorgio Mammoliti; 6,447	Mario Sergio; 9,245	Danny Varaich; 3,989				Giorgio Mammoliti

=== Toronto ===
Electoral district	Candidates						Incumbent
Electoral district	NDP	Liberal	PC	Green	Natural Law	Other	Incumbent
Beaches—Woodbine	Frances Lankin; 10,862	Stephen Lautens; 6,158	Lynda Buffet; 7,923		Donalda Fredeen; 162	Brad Allen (Ind); 319; Miguel Figueroa (Comm); 169	Frances Lankin
Dovercourt	Tony Silipo; 9,049	Maria Dasilva-Skultety; 5,561	Malcolm Mansfield; 3,560	Shelly Lipsey; 390	Erica Kindl; 179	Amani Oakley (Ind Labour); 261; Douglas Quinn (Lbt); 161	Tony Silipo
Eglinton	Adam Di Carlo; 4,597	Dianne Poole; 12,904	Bill Saunderson; 17,496	Dan King; 395	Linda Martin; 325	Fernand Deschamps (Ind Renewal); 123	Dianne Poole
Fort York	Rosario Marchese; 10,762	Bob Wong; 8,482	Jacob Joel; 6,025	Kevin Ells; 300	Maurice Seguin; 133	Paul Barker (Lbt); 266; Matthew Shepherd (Ind); 140; John Steele (Comm League); 129	Rosario Marchese
High Park—Swansea	Elaine Ziemba; 8,899	Ted Lojko; 7,121	Derwyn Shea; 10,559	David Burman; 368	Greg Roberts; 286		Elaine Ziemba
Parkdale	Martin Silva; 5,795	Tony Ruprecht; 8,435	Fred Blucher; 2,887	Miriam Hawkins; 363		Wilfred Szczesny (Comm); 142	Tony Ruprecht
Riverdale	Marilyn Churley; 10,948	Frank Lowery; 5,443	John Gamble; 6,348	Marianna Tzabiras; 217	Loucas Café; 124	Pat Marquis (Ind); 273	Marilyn Churley
St. Andrew—St. Patrick	David Jacobs; 9,231	Carolyn Bennett; 9,413	Isabel Bassett; 13,092	Hamish Wilson; 271	Bruce Hislop; 237	Mark Scott (Lbt); 141	Vacant
St. George—St. David	Brent Hawkes; 9,672	Tim Murphy; 10,325	Al Leach; 10,662	Chris Lea; 241	Ron Robins; 151	Linda Gibbons (Ind); 326; Alexander Nosal (Ind); 98	Tim Murphy

=== Etobicoke and York ===
Electoral district	Candidates						Incumbent
Electoral district	NDP	Liberal	PC	Libertarian	Natural Law	Other	Incumbent
Etobicoke—Humber	Osman Ali; 3,100	Jim Henderson; 13,634	Doug Ford, Sr. 18,128		Lawrence Staranchuk; 196	Omar Mohamed (Ind); 257; Mohamoud Sheik-Nor (Ind); 51	Jim Henderson
Etobicoke—Lakeshore	Ruth Grier; 8,279	Bruce Davis; 9,074	Morley Kells; 14,879	Daniel Hunt; 270	Geraldine Jackson; 209	Julie Northrup (Ind Renewal); 186	Ruth Grier
Etobicoke—Rexdale	Ed Philip; 8,668	Lorraine Nowina; 7,173	John Hastings; 9,521		Miki Staranchuk; 188	Diane Johnston (Ind Renewal); 488	Ed Philip
Etobicoke West	Judy Jones; 4,608	Michael Brown; 9,826	Chris Stockwell; 18,349		Laureen Amos; 399		Chris Stockwell
Oakwood	Tony Rizzo; 7,624	Mike Colle; 8,599	Courtney Doldron; 3,298	Nunzio Venuto; 100	Doug Storey; 135	Joe Flexer (Ind Labour); 301; Constantine Kritsonis (G); 269	Tony Rizzo
York South	Bob Rae; 10,442	Hagood Hardy; 6,025	Larry Edwards; 7,726	Roma Kelembet; 153	Bob Hyman; 176	Don Pennell (FCP); 305; David James Cooper (G); 219; Kevin Clarke (Ind); 170; Darrell Rankin (Comm); 105	Bob Rae

=== Brampton, Mississauga and Halton ===
Electoral district	Candidates				Incumbent
Electoral district	NDP	Liberal	PC	Other	Incumbent
Brampton North	John Devries; 5,288	Carman McClelland; 14,800	Joe Spina; 20,148	Lester Newby (NLP); 494	Carman McClelland
Brampton South	Paul Ledgister; 5,676	Bob Callahan; 15,237	Tony Clement; 21,859	Bernie Cissek (FCP); 1,011; Maxim Newby (NLP); 229	Bob Callahan
Burlington South	David Miles; 3,507	Ray Rivers; 5,415	Cam Jackson; 24,831	Emidio Corvaro (FCP); 470	Cam Jackson
Halton Centre	Richard Banigan; 5,268	Barbara Sullivan; 13,977	Terence Young; 30,621		Barbara Sullivan
Halton North	Noel Duignan; 4,362	Walt Elliot; 6,568	Ted Chudleigh; 19,247	Alex McKee (FCP); 1,239; John Shadbolt (Lbt); 461	Noel Duignan
Mississauga East	Zenia Wadhwani; 5,120	Konstantine Katsoulis; 10,039	Carl DeFaria; 16,468		John Sola
Mississauga North	Dan Shekhar; 5,283	Steve Offer; 17,681	John Snobelen; 22,095	John Boddy (G); 1,206	Steve Offer
Mississauga South	David Messenger; 3,282	Ieva Martin; 5,551	Margaret Marland; 23,116	Scott Kay (NLP); 334; Adrian Crewson (Ind); 309; Wolfgang Mueller (Ind); 287; Matthew Wood (G); 256	Margaret Marland
Mississauga West	Paul Daniel; 6,758	Steve Mahoney; 23,275	Rob Sampson; 26,614	George Meekins (CoR); 952	Steve Mahoney
Oakville South	Willie Lambert; 2,973	Lou Rocca; 8,479	Gary Carr; 21,689	Mike Rooney (FCP); 1,103	Gary Carr

=== Hamilton-Wentworth and Niagara ===
Electoral district	Candidates						Incumbent
Electoral district	NDP	Liberal	PC	FCP	Natural Law	Other	Incumbent
Hamilton Centre	David Christopherson; 8,012	Filomena Tassi; 7,322	Angie Tomasic; 5,723	Tom Wigglesworth; 376	Monique Poudrette; 331		David Christopherson
Hamilton East	Andrew Mackenzie; 7,042	Dominic Agostino; 11,088	Don Sheppard; 6,263	Angela Corvaro; 681		Bob Mann (Comm); 389	Robert W. Mackenzie
Hamilton Mountain	Brian Charlton; 9,817	Marie Bountrogianni; 12,824	Trevor Pettit; 13,852	Michael O'Grady; 1,329			Brian Charlton
Hamilton West	Richard Allen; 9,267	Helen Wilson; 8,911	Lillian Ross; 13,301	Lynne Scime; 880	Rita Rassenberg; 284	Hans Wienhold (Lbt); 169	Richard Allen
Lincoln	Ron Hansen; 5,800	Harry Pelissero; 10,876	Frank Sheehan; 18,709	Tristan Emmanuel; 1,241	Mary Glasser; 288		Ron Hansen
Niagara Falls	Margaret Harrington; 7,034	Marg Germano; 8,289	Bart Maves; 12,132		Bill Amos; 355	Melania Gural (Ind); 189	Margaret Harrington
Niagara South	Shirley Coppen; 5,376	Aubrey Foley; 7,634	Tim Hudak; 8,815	Al Kiers; 536		Morton Sider (Ind); 688	Shirley Coppen
St. Catharines	Jeff Burch; 3,929	Jim Bradley; 13,761	Archie Heide; 11,486	Jon Siemens; 245	Marcy Sheremetta; 153		Jim Bradley
St. Catharines—Brock	Christel Haeck; 5,521	Gail Richardson; 7,373	Tom Froese; 11,976	Bert Pynenburg; 598			Christel Haeck
Welland—Thorold	Peter Kormos; 12,848	Bob Muir; 8,630	Greg Reid; 8,089		Helene Ann Darisse; 232	Barry Fitzgerald (F); 285	Peter Kormos
Wentworth East	Mark Morrow; 6,667	Shirley Collins; 12,282	Ed Doyle; 15,888			Mark Davies (Ind); 863	Mark Morrow
Wentworth North	Don Abel; 6,474	Chris Ward; 10,393	Toni Skarica; 21,165				Don Abel

=== Midwestern Ontario ===
Electoral district	Candidates					Incumbent
Electoral district	NDP	Liberal	PC	FCP	Other	Incumbent
Brantford	Brad Ward; 8,165	Dave Neumann; 10,418	Ron Johnson; 13,745	Paul Vandervet; 762	William Darfler (G); 430	Brad Ward
Brant—Haldimand	Willem Hanrath; 3,030	Ronald Eddy; 10,589	Peter Preston; 14,184	Steve Elgersma; 1,340	Terry Childs (G); 527	Ronald Eddy
Cambridge	Mike Farnan; 11,797	Ben Tucci; 5,606	Gerry Martiniuk; 17,269	Al Smith; 1,690	Reg Gervais (Ind); 433	Mike Farnan
Guelph	Derek Fletcher; 10,278	Rick Ferraro; 11,459	Brenda Elliott; 17,204	John Gots; 1,035	Thomas Bradburn (Lbt); 265; Anna Di Carlo (Ind Renewal); 187	Derek Fletcher
Huron	Paul Klopp; 6,927	John Jewitt; 7,009	Helen Johns; 13,343	Phil Cornish; 1,418	Kimble Ainslie (Ref); 207	Paul Klopp
Kitchener	Sandi Ellis; 6,998	Bryan Stortz; 9,992	Wayne Wettlaufer; 13,374	Lou Reitzel; 2,111	Bob Oberholtzer (Ind); 612; Frank Kerek (Ind); 223	Vacant
Kitchener—Wilmot	Mike Cooper; 8,146	Shelly Schlueter; 10,106	Gary Leadston; 17,392	Ted Kryn; 2,415		Mike Cooper
Norfolk	Norm Jamison; 7,893	Rudy Stickl; 9,413	Toby Barrett; 17,335	Andre De Decker; 972		Norm Jamison
Oxford	Kimble Sutherland; 9,501	Bruce Sibbick; 6,564	Ernie Hardeman; 17,568	Case Van Blyderveen; 1,061	Kaye Sargent (Lbt); 386; Jim Morris (NLP); 275; Jim Montag (F); 148	Kimble Sutherland
Perth	Karen Haslam; 8,445	Gerry Teahen; 7,722	Bert Johnson; 13,735		Robert Smink (F); 427; Patrick Van Galen (Ind); 326	Karen Haslam
Waterloo North	Hugh Miller; 6,869	Bob Byron; 8,729	Elizabeth Witmer; 25,757	Sandra Kryn; 1,714	Blaine Watson (NLP); 275	Elizabeth Witmer
Wellington	Elaine Rogala; 4,104	Don Ross; 5,706	Ted Arnott; 21,573	John Meenan; 782	Dianne Sanderson (Lbt); 269	Ted Arnott

=== Southwestern Ontario ===
Electoral district	Candidates						Incumbent
Electoral district	NDP	Liberal	PC	FCP	Natural Law	Other	Incumbent
Chatham—Kent	Randy Hope; 7,444	Mike Ferguson; 9,915	Jack Carroll; 10,461	David Edwards; 1,008			Randy Hope
Elgin	Hugh MacGinnis; 3,445	Barry Fitzgerald; 5,801	Jim Williams; 10,660			Peter North (Ind.); 12,436; Ray Monteith (F); 565	Peter North
Essex-Kent	Pat Hayes; 7,837	Pat Hoy; 10,130	George Kennedy; 8,384	Steve Posthumus; 1,022			Pat Hayes
Essex South	Dave Maris; 4,348	Bruce Crozier; 14,513	Dave Wylupek; 5,730	Joyce Cherry; 1,550	David Mitchell; 498		Bruce Crozier
Lambton	Dona Stewardson; 5,055	Larry O'Neill; 7,925	Marcel Beaubien; 12,034	Jim Hopper; 2,184		Wayne Forbes (F); 417	Ellen MacKinnon
London Centre	Marion Boyd; 11,096	Ron Postian; 7,559	Patrick McGuinness; 9,364	Mike Dwyer; 1,041	Liz Overall; 134	Jeff Culbert (G); 533; Lloyd Walker (F); 452	Marion Boyd
London North	Carolyn Davies; 8,167	Larry Crossan; 11,112	Dianne Cunningham; 23,195	Graeme Benedetti; 777	Rita Varrin; 101	John Beverley (G); 365; Jack Plant (F); 334	Dianne Cunningham
London South	David Winninger; 10,729	Joan Smith; 10,693	Bob Wood; 18,161	Rudy Polci; 387	James Hea; 111	Maureen Battaglia (F); 340; Mark Simpson (Ref); 323; Sven Biggs (G); 202	David Winninger
Middlesex	Irene Mathyssen; 8,799	Doug Reycraft; 10,448	Bruce Smith; 15,684	Jamie Harris; 3,481		Barry Malcolm (F); 458	Irene Mathyssen
Sarnia	Bob Huget; 7,487	Joan Link; 8,626	David Boushy; 9,260	Ron Raes; 1,642		Anthony Barbato (Ind); 217; Andrew Falby (Ind); 159	Bob Huget
Windsor—Riverside	Dave Cooke; 12,347	Gary McNamara; 9,412	Blaine Tyndall; 4,440	Michel Ozorak; 459	Sherry Lanier; 362		Dave Cooke
Windsor—Sandwich	Arlene Rousseau; 6,414	Sandra Pupatello; 11,940	Joe Durocher; 5,704	Earl Amyotte; 610	Ronald Bessette; 263	Christine Wilson (Ind); 410	George Dadamo
Windsor—Walkerville	Wayne Lessard; 9,901	Dwight Duncan; 10,281	Michael Rohrer; 3,610	Donna Halliday; 957	Vivek Narula; 156		Wayne Lessard

=== Northeastern Ontario ===
Electoral district	Candidates				Incumbent
Electoral district	NDP	Liberal	PC	Other	Incumbent
Algoma	Bud Wildman; 6,190	Paula Dunning; 3,128	Phil Sabine; 4,602		Bud Wildman
Algoma—Manitoulin	Lois Miller; 2,991	Mike Brown; 7,238	Joyce Foster; 5,184		Mike Brown
Cochrane North	Len Wood; 6,935	Gilles Gagnon; 4,952	Louis Veilleux; 3,316		Len Wood
Cochrane South	Gilles Bisson; 12,114	Jim Brown; 4,958	Gord Miller; 6,587	Joel Vien (Ind); 339	Gilles Bisson
Nickel Belt	Floyd Laughren; 8,007	Betty Rheaume; 5,549	Frank Deburger; 3,305	Michel Chartrand (Ind); 225; Grace Tancock (NLP); 119	Floyd Laughren
Nipissing	Doug Bennett; 4,350	Bert Brandon; 7,885	Mike Harris; 18,722		Mike Harris
Parry Sound	Dan Reed; 3,367	Mark Fisher; 4,821	Ernie Eves; 15,523		Ernie Eves
Sault Ste. Marie	Tony Martin; 15,392	Carmen Provenzano; 11,672	Lou Turco; 7,699	Paul Thompson (G); 757	Tony Martin
Sudbury	Sharon Murdock; 8,698	Rick Bartolucci; 12,349	Richard Zanibbi; 8,093	Don Scott (Ind); 506; David Gordon (NL); 315; Lewis Poulin (G); 290; Ed Pokonzie (Ind); 123	Sharon Murdock
Sudbury East	Shelley Martel; 11,236	Paul Menard; 9,594	Don Mark; 8,680	Guy Martin (Ind); 473; William Morrison (NLP); 310	Shelley Martel
Timiskaming	Ambrose Raftis; 2,962	David Ramsay; 8,643	Ian MacPherson; 6,185	Ralph Schaffner (CoR); 685	David Ramsay

=== Northwestern Ontario ===
Electoral district	Candidates				Incumbent
Electoral district	NDP	Liberal	PC	Other	Incumbent
Fort William	Greg Laws; 4,561	Lyn McLeod; 15,681	Evelyn Dodds; 7,116		Lyn McLeod
Kenora	Mike Clancy; 2,788	Frank Miclash; 9,152	Gord Griffiths; 5,097		Frank Miclash
Lake Nipigon	Gilles Pouliot; 5,079	Ian MacQuarrie; 3,463	Vic Fournel; 3,273		Gilles Pouliot
Port Arthur	Shelley Wark-Martyn; 7,490	Michael Gravelle; 14,281	Jim Doherty; 6,554	Anita Harris (FCP); 683; Paul Weber (Ind); 182	Shelley Wark-Martyn
Rainy River	Howard Hampton; 4,912	Darren Brown; 2,683	Lynn Beyak; 4,707		Howard Hampton

== Byelections ==
Due to resignations, five by-elections were held between the 1995 and 1999 elections.

Electoral district	Candidates				Incumbent
Electoral district	Liberal	PC	NDP	Other	Incumbent
York South; May 23, 1996	Gerard Kennedy; 7,774	Rob Davis; 5,093	David Miller; 6,656	David Milne (Ind); 151; George Dance (Lbt); 77; Kevin Clarke (Ind); 70	Bob Rae resigned February 29, 1996
Oriole; September 4, 1997	David Caplan; 9,954	Barbara Greene; 5,163	Jim Kafieh; 1,700	Bernadette Michael (Ind); 132; Shelly Lipsey (G); 96	Elinor Caplan resigned May 5, 1997
Ottawa West; September 4, 1997	Alex Cullen; 11,438	Chris Thompson; 7,217	Katrina Prystupa; 2,573	John Turmel (Ind); 201; Gene Villeneuve (G); 96	Bob Chiarelli resigned May 5, 1997
Windsor—Riverside; September 4, 1997	Gary McNamara; 8,494	Fran Funero; 3,028	Wayne Lessard; 9,308	Steve Harvey (G); 329	Dave Cooke resigned May 5, 1997
Nickel Belt; October 1, 1998	Frank Madigan; 4,173	Gerry Courtemanche; 3,836	Blain Morin; 5,537		Floyd Laughren resigned February 28, 1998
