= Tristan Emmanuel =

Canadian political and religious activist

- Born: Waterloo, Ontario, Canada
- Occupations: activist, publisher

Tristan Alexander Emmanuel is a Canadian political and religious activist. He is the founder and former president of the Equipping Christians for the Public-square Centre (ECP Centre) and an outspoken opponent of same-sex marriage in Canada. He is now the president of Freedom Press Canada Inc., a niche publishing company that he founded in 2003.

== Early life and career ==
Emmanuel was raised in Waterloo, Ontario as part of a nominally Lutheran family. After earning a Bachelor of Arts degree and attending divinity school in the United States, he was ordained as a minister in the Reformed Presbyterian Church General Assembly. He operated a small freight delivery company in Ontario's Niagara region in the 1990s, and served as the pastor of Living Hope Orthodox Presbyterian Church in Vineland. He later worked toward a Master's degree at McMaster University's Divinity School, writing about the efforts of early Christian apologists to lobby Roman Emperors.

In 1999, Emmanuel founded Equipping Christians for the Public-square. He remained its president for several years, before resigning in 2008.

Emmanuel was a candidate for the socially conservative Family Coalition Party in the Lincoln electoral division in the 1995 Ontario provincial election. He was quoted as saying, "It's time to have a principled party that understands there's a higher power than the government, a power we believe is God." Emmanuel argued that problems of unemployment and economic development could only be solved by a free-market system, and called for the government to shift welfare services to community organizations. He also opposed the Progressive Conservative Party's workfare proposal, which he described as "nothing more than slavery". He finished fourth against Progressive Conservative candidate Frank Sheehan.

Emmanuel ran against prominent federal politician Sheila Copps in a 1996 by-election as a candidate of the Christian Heritage Party of Canada. In this campaign, he called for harsher prison sentences and an increased focus on the rights of victims. He argued that Canada's Young Offenders Act should be abolished and corporal punishment reintroduced to schools, and was quoted as saying, "If an eleven-year-old murders someone, I think his life should be taken." He finished ninth in a field of thirteen candidates. Emmanuel also ran for the Christian Heritage Party in the 1997 federal election, and finished fifth against Liberal incumbent Walt Lastewka. Later, he described both the Family Coalition Party and the Christian Heritage Party as political dead ends.

== Social conservative activism ==
Emmanuel became more involved with right-wing and socially conservative campaigns in the first decade of the twenty-first century. In April 2003, he organized a "Canadians for Bush" rally in Queenston Heights, Ontario, to support the American invasion of Iraq. The rally was attended by several prominent federal and provincial politicians, including Stockwell Day and provincial cabinet ministers Jim Flaherty and Tim Hudak.

Emmanuel's organizational role in the rally drew attention to controversial statements he had made in previous years. The New Democratic Party of Ontario (NDP) issued a press release with excerpts from several of Emmanuel's writings, asserting that he had described gay men as "sexual deviants" and Islam as "as far from peace, as hell is from heaven" in separate articles written in 2002. NDP legislator Rosario Marchese called on Hudak and Flaherty to disengage themselves from the rally in light of these statements. A spokesperson for Hudak responded that the minister had not known about Emmanuel's articles before seeing the press release, and that the pro-American rally should not be "sidetracked" over the matter.

As executive director of the ECP Centre, Emmanuel organized several public forums throughout 2003 to discuss same-sex marriage and the extension of Canada's hate speech laws to cover statements made against gays and lesbians. Most speakers at these events were social conservatives who opposed both legislative initiatives, although some speakers took different views.

Emmanuel campaigned against the legal recognition of same-sex marriage in Canada in 2005, organizing several rallies across the country, including one outside Parliament Hill in Ottawa and another at Queen's Park outside the Legislative Assembly of Ontario. Emmanuel sought to include non-Christian groups in these events, inviting Jewish and Muslim representatives as speakers. He also sought to build connections with the American Christian right. Notwithstanding his efforts, same-sex marriage was granted legal recognition throughout Canada in the summer of 2005.

Concerns were raised in this period about the influence of Emmanuel's organization over Conservative Party nominations in some ridings. In particular, his endorsement of three candidates at a rally in Kemptville, Nova Scotia was seen as helping those candidates secure party nominations in their ridings. Asked about the matter, Emmanuel said, "It's time we stopped apologizing and started defending who we are. The evangelical community in Canada, by and large, and socially conservative Catholics, are saying we have been far too heavenly minded and thus we have been of no earthly value for far too long, on too many fronts." He declined to say how many of his adherents had secured Conservative Party nominations, arguing that the media would portray his campaign as the infiltration of the party by "right-wing fanatics." He also stated that his group was non-partisan, and that he was not working as an agent of the Conservative Party.

In a 2005 interview with the Hamilton Spectator, Emmanuel described homosexuals as "sexual deviants" and that homosexuality is "a choice," said that he regarded it as "the wrong choice, a bad choice," and further argued that "the state shouldn't sanction wrong choices." He acknowledged that his views would be hurtful to some readers, but argued that this did not make his opinions hateful.

During this period, Emmanuel sought to distance himself from statements he had made three years earlier that were critical of Islam. Discussing a 2002 article in which he favourably cited Franklin Graham's description of Islam as an "evil and wicked religion," Emmanuel said, "I know the religion itself isn't that [evil and wicked] but it was a polemical piece ... written in the context of 9/11." He added, "Polemics doesn't define a man. As I get old and more mature, I realize polemics has its place, but you have to be careful."

In late 2005, Emmanuel undertook a speaking tour of the United States. He argued that Canada's political establishment was attempting to export a liberal culture to the United States via the United Nations, and encouraged Canadian citizens living in the United States to vote against the Liberal Party in the 2006 federal election. During the election itself, he campaigned for the next parliament to revisit the issue of same-sex marriage. Later in the year, Emmanuel told a conference in Washington, D.C. that Christians were discriminated against in Canada.

== 2009 Progressive Conservative leadership contest ==
Emmanuel resurfaced in 2009 as campaign manager for Randy Hillier, in the latter's bid to lead the Progressive Conservative Party of Ontario. During this campaign, Emmanuel and other figures in the Progressive Conservative Party called for the abolition of the Ontario Human Rights Tribunal. Hillier finished last in a field of four candidates on the first ballot and gave his support to the eventual winner, Tim Hudak.

== Endorsements ==
Stockwell Day has endorsed Emmanuel, writing "[w]hether promoting friendship between nations or rallying for family and faith, Tristan has worked diligently to promote conservative causes in Canada."

== Writings ==
Emmanuel is the author of a book entitled, Christophobia: The Real Reason Behind Hate Crime Legislation, in which he argues that hate crime legislation in Canada has resulted in a loss of religious freedom. He is also the author of the 2006 book Warned: Canada's Revolution Against Faith, Family, and Freedom Threatens America.

== Electoral record ==
1997 Canadian federal election: St. Catharines
Party	Candidate	Votes	%	±%	Expenditures
Liberal	Walt Lastewka	21,081	43.5	−5.6	$46,896
Reform	Rob Hesp	15,029	31.0	+2.2	$41,350
Progressive Conservative	Gregg Crealock	6,503	13.4	−1.6	$25,799
New Democratic	Ed Gould	4,657	9.6	+3.8	$24,683
Christian Heritage	Tristan Emmanuel	688	1.4	+0.2	$7,249
Canadian Action	G.L. Malcolm	308	0.6	–	$2,976
Natural Law	Helene Darisse	245	0.5	–	$0.00
Total valid votes		48,511	100.0		
Total rejected ballots		272			
Turnout		48,783	65.49		
Electors on the lists		74,484			
Sources: Official Results, Elections Canada and Financial Returns, Elections Canada.

Canadian federal by-election, June 17, 1996: Hamilton East
Party	Candidate	Votes	%	Expenditures
Liberal	Sheila Copps	12,268	46.09	$52,208
New Democratic Party	Wayne Marston	6,941	26.08	$50,019
Progressive Conservative	Angie Tomasic	3,662	13.76	not listed
Reform	Andy Sweck	2,750	10.33	$44,372
Ind. (Christian Freedom)	Ken Campbell	287	1.08	$8,704
Non-Affiliated	George Ambas	160	0.60	$5,700
Green	Wendy Priesnitz	152	0.57	$3,103
Independent	Glenn Malcolm	113	0.42	$3,414
Christian Heritage	Tristan Emmanuel	78	0.29	$2,770
Non-Affiliated	Victor Knight	70	0.26	$16,354
Natural Law	Bill Amos	64	0.24	$42
Canada Party	Charles Olito	52	0.20	$9,727
Abolitionist	John Turmel	21	0.08	$0
Total valid votes		26,618	100.00	
Total rejected ballots		271		
Turnout		26,889	51.13	
Electors on the lists		52,592		
All data from Elections Canada.

1995 Ontario general election: Lincoln
Party	Candidate	Votes	%	±%	Expenditures
Progressive Conservative	Frank Sheehan	18,709	50.68		$44,992.99
Liberal	Harry Pelissero	10,876	29.46	–	$36,631.91
New Democratic	Ron Hansen	5,800	15.71		$19,168.08
Family Coalition	Tristan Emmanuel	1,241	3.36	–	$3,872.39
Natural Law	Mary Glasser	288	0.78		$0
Total valid votes		36,914	100.00		
Rejected, unmarked and declined ballots		317			
Turnout		37,231	68.09		
Electors on the lists		54,677			
