= Frank Howard Greenlaw =

Canadian politician from Ontario

Member of the Ontario Provincial Parliament for St. Catharines
- In office October 20, 1919 – May 10, 1923
- Preceded by: Elisha Jessop
- Succeeded by: Edwin Cyrus Graves

Personal details
- Party: Labour

Frank Howard Greenlaw was a Canadian politician from the Labour Party. He represented St. Catharines in the Legislative Assembly of Ontario from 1919 to 1923.

== See also ==
- 15th Parliament of Ontario
- List of United Farmers/Labour MLAs in the Ontario legislature
