= Frederick Raymond Parnell =

Canadian politician

Member of the Legislative Assembly of Ontario
- In office 1919–1919
- Preceded by: Elisha Jessop
- Constituency: St. Catharines

Personal details
- Born: June 24, 1868 Grantham Township, Ontario
- Died: February 27, 1951 (aged 82) St. Catharines, Ontario
- Party: Conservative
- Spouse: Margaret Arbuthnot
- Occupation: Merchant, wholesale grocer

Frederick Raymond Parnell (June 24, 1868 – February 27, 1951) was an Ontario merchant and political figure. He represented St. Catharines in the Legislative Assembly of Ontario as a Conservative member in 1919.

He was born in Grantham Township, Ontario, the son of Lewis Parnell, and was educated in the township and in St. Catharines. Parnell operated a wholesale grocery business. He married Margaret Arbuthnot. Parnell was a member of the Board of Education and of the Water Commission. He also served as a member of the local militia during the 1880s and as a sergeant in the Home Guard during World War II. He was also the Grand Registrar of the Provincial Grand Black Chapter of Ontario West, a Freemason group. Parnell was elected to the provincial assembly in a 1919 by-election held after the death of Elisha Jessop. He was the first president of the Lincoln Historical Society and of the United Empire Loyalist Society. He served as president of the Historical Society of St. Catharines from 1927 to 1935. He was a master in the local Orange Lodge and a prominent member of the local Masonic lodge. He died in St. Catharines.
