= Thomas Marshall (Canadian politician) =

Canadian politician

Thomas A. Marshall

Ontario MPP
- In office 1914–1923
- Preceded by: Elisha Jessop
- Succeeded by: Robert Kemp
- Constituency: Lincoln
- In office 1911–1914
- Preceded by: James Alway Ross
- Succeeded by: Riding abolished
- Constituency: Monck

Personal details
- Born: November 25, 1864; Dunn Township, Haldimand County, Canada West
- Died: March 11, 1951 (aged 86); Dunnville, Ontario
- Political party: Liberal
- Spouse: Elizabeth Lackie (m. 1905)
- Occupation: Merchant

Thomas A. Marshall (November 25, 1864 – March 11, 1951) was a merchant and political figure in Ontario, Canada. He represented Monck from 1911 to 1914 and then Lincoln from 1914 to 1923 in the Legislative Assembly of Ontario as a Liberal member.

He was born in Dunn Township, Haldimand County, Canada West, the son of Henry Marshall. Henry Marshall was an early pioneer of Dunn Township. He was educated in Dunnville and at Toronto University. In 1905, he married Elizabeth Lackie. Marshall owned a hardware store. He served as director for the town telephone company and served on the board of education. Marshall served with the Queen's Own Rifles during the North-West Rebellion of 1885.

He died in Dunnville, Ontario in 1951.
