= Walt Lastewka =

Canadian politician (born 1940)

The Honourable Walter Thomas Lastewka PC

Member of Parliament for St. Catharines
- In office 1993–2006
- Preceded by: Ken Atkinson
- Succeeded by: Rick Dykstra

Personal details
- Born: October 11, 1940 (age 85) Montreal, Quebec, Canada
- Party: Liberal
- Spouse: Carol Lastewka
- Profession: Executive manager, industrial engineer

Walter Thomas Lastewka PC (born October 11, 1940) is a Canadian politician. He was a member of the House of Commons of Canada from 1993 to 2006, representing the Ontario riding of St. Catharines as a member of the Liberal Party.

== Early life and career ==
Lastewka was born in Montreal, Quebec and was educated at Ryerson Polytechnical Institute (known at the time as Ryerson Technical Institute) in Toronto, receiving a diploma in 1963. He was hired as an industrial engineer by General Motors in the same year, was promoted to supervisor of industrial engineering in 1967, and held several managerial positions before his retirement in 1992. He completed the three-week-long University of Western Ontario Executive Program in 1981. Lastewka has been involved in several community activities, including serving as a director of the United Way and as a trustee of Brock University. He is also a former director and parish chairman for St. John's Ukrainian Church. In the early 1990s, he was head of the St. Catharines Promotion Task Force.

== Political career ==
Lastewka joined the St. Catharines branch of the Liberal Party in 1972 and worked as campaign manager to federal Member of Parliament Gilbert Parent in every election between 1974 and 1988. He was vice-president of organization for the Ontario Liberal Party from 1979 to 1981 and chaired provincial campaigns for Jim Bradley and Harry Pelissero. He was elected to Parliament in the 1993 election, defeating incumbent Progressive Conservative Ken Atkinson by a significant margin.

He served as parliamentary secretary to the Minister of Industry from 1997 to 1999 and as parliamentary secretary to the Minister of Public Works and Government Services from 2003 to 2006. Before the 2004 election, he held special responsibility for matters relating to procurement review.

A Hamilton Spectator newspaper report from 1996 described Lastewka as "one of the most hardworking, effective parliamentarians" in office. He spearheaded a movement to clean up the St. Catharines Twelve Mile Creek during his first term and used his knowledge of government bureaucracy to expedite the city's bid to host the 1999 World Rowing Championships. Lastewka supported Paul Martin's bid to succeed Jean Chrétien as Liberal Party leader during the 1990s, and was one of the first Liberal MPs to call for Chrétien's resignation in 2000. It was reported that a 2002 telephone conversation between Lastewka and Chrétien turned heated, with Lastewka claiming that the Liberal government under Chrétien hadn't "done a damn thing" for Niagara.

In 1995, Lastewka criticized the Government of Canada for attempting to deport Johann Dueck, a constituent who had been accused of committing war crimes during World War II. The government asserted that Dueck was the deputy chief in a police unit that participated in Nazi atrocities and charged him with having obtained Canadian citizenship in 1948 by concealing his past. Dueck denied the charges, saying that he had been conscripted by the Nazis at gunpoint to work as a translator. Lastewka argued that if Dueck was to be charged, it should have been under a 1987 law that allowed accused war criminals to be tried domestically in Canada. Referring to the deportation procedure, he was quoted as saying "I feel very uncomfortable that we have to go back 50 years to correct whatever happened then [...] My heart goes out to them and their family and their friends." He pledged to help the family in any way he could. Lastewka was criticized for these comments by the Toronto Star newspaper and some Canadian Jewish leaders, including Sol Littman of the Simon Wiesenthal Center. The charges against Dueck were dismissed in 1998, when Justice Marc Noel found that the government had not proven he was a war criminal or even a member of the police unit in question. Johann Dueck's lawyers were paid $750,000 by taxpayers. He was not deported, and a subsequent editorial in The Globe and Mail newspaper described him as having been "clearly innocent of the charges."

Also in 1995, Lastewka petitioned the government for an inquiry into the way crown officials handled the prosecution of Karla Homolka. Homolka, a former resident of St. Catharines, was given a twelve-year sentence through a plea-bargain despite having assisted her husband, Paul Bernardo, in the rape and murder of two young girls. Lastewka argued that the sentence was far too lenient and called for a review of the negotiation process. He later called for Senator Michel Biron to resign in 2005, after Biron wrote a letter opposing restrictions on Homolka following her release. Lastewka said that he was "appalled" by Biron's letter and wrote that the Senator displayed "complete and utter disregard" for the families of Homolka's victims. In light of these and other criticisms, Biron offered an apology.

Lastewka holds socially conservative views on some issues. He voted against Bill C-33 (1996), which amended the Canadian Human Rights Act to include sexual orientation as a prohibited basis for discrimination. He later voted against Bill C38 (2005), which legalized same-sex marriage rights in Canada. However, he later argued that the Canadian government should accept the legal status of same-sex marriages and not revisit the issue. Local gay rights activist Ted Mouradian endorsed Lastewka in 2005, arguing that he was a better candidate than his Conservative opponent.

He was narrowly defeated by Conservative Rick Dykstra in the 2006 federal election. The margin of defeat was only 246 votes, one of the smallest in the country.

On March 22, 2007, Lastewka was acclaimed as the Liberal Party candidate for St. Catharines in the next federal election. However, Lastewka was defeated by an increased margin in the 2008 election.

== Electoral record ==
2008 Canadian federal election
Party	Candidate	Votes	%	±%	Expenditures
Conservative	(x)Rick Dykstra	23,474	45.9%	+8.4%	$77,155
Liberal	Walt Lastewka	14,652	28.6%	-8.4%	$85,551
New Democratic	George Addision	9,428	18.4%	--2.1%	$21,329
Green	Jim Fannon	3,477	6.8%	+2.8%	$3,511
Communist	Sam Hammond	113	0.2%	–	$410
Total valid votes/Expense limit		51,144	100%	$88,319	
Rejected ballots		161			
Turnout		51,305			

2006 Canadian federal election: St. Catharines
Party	Candidate	Votes	%	±%	Expenditures
Conservative	Rick Dykstra	21,668	37.5	+2.8	$78,093.76
Liberal	Walt Lastewka	21,424	37.0	−3.4	$76,408.07
New Democratic	Jeff Burch	11,849	20.5	+1.2	$15,482.42
Green	Jim Fannon	2,306	4.0	+0.3	$991.15
Christian Heritage	Bill Bylsma	499	0.9	−0.5	$8,736.24
Marxist–Leninist	Elaine Couto	100	0.2	+0.1	
Total valid votes		57,846	100.0		
Sources: Official Results, Elections Canada and Financial Returns, Elections Canada.

2004 Canadian federal election: St. Catharines
Party	Candidate	Votes	%	±%	Expenditures
Liberal	Walt Lastewka	21,277	40.4	−4.5	$67,606.54
Conservative	Leo Bonomi	18,261	34.7	−13.2	$76,063.45
New Democratic	Ted Mouradian	10,135	19.3	+13.1	$13,554.17
Green	Jim Fannon	1,927	3.7	–	$1,145.69
Christian Heritage	Linda Klassen	751	1.4	–	$15,303.13
Canadian Action	Jane Elizabeth Paxton	204	0.4	–	$0.00
Marxist–Leninist	Elaine Couto	61	0.1	−0.1	$6.90
Total valid votes		52,616	100.0		
Total rejected ballots		240			
Turnout		52,856	62.03		
Electors on the lists		85,209			
Percentage change figures are factored for redistribution. Conservative Party percentages are contrasted with the combined Canadian Alliance and Progressive Conservative percentages from 2000. Sources: Official Results, Elections Canada and Financial Returns, Elections Canada.

2000 Canadian federal election: St. Catharines
Party	Candidate	Votes	%	±%	Expenditures
Liberal	Walt Lastewka	20,992	44.9	+1.5	$48,037.11
Alliance	Randy Taylor Dumont	15,871	34.0	+3.0	$65,538.72
Progressive Conservative	Ken Atkinson	6,522	14.0	+0.6	$20,495.69
New Democratic	John Bacher	2,878	6.2	−3.4	$12,153.96
Natural Law	Jim Morris	203	0.4	−0.1	$0.00
Independent	Tilly Bylsma	166	0.4	–	$4,942.92
Marxist–Leninist	Elaine Couto	93	0.2	–	$8.00
Total valid votes		46,725	100.0		
Total rejected ballots		223			
Turnout		46,948	60.02		
Electors on the lists		78,215			
Sources: Note: Canadian Alliance vote is compared to the Reform vote in 1997 election Official Results, Elections Canada and Financial Returns, Elections Canada.

1997 Canadian federal election: St. Catharines
Party	Candidate	Votes	%	±%	Expenditures
Liberal	Walt Lastewka	21,081	43.5	−5.6	$46,896
Reform	Rob Hesp	15,029	31.0	+2.2	$41,350
Progressive Conservative	Gregg Crealock	6,503	13.4	−1.6	$25,799
New Democratic	Ed Gould	4,657	9.6	+3.8	$24,683
Christian Heritage	Tristan Emmanuel	688	1.4	+0.2	$7,249
Canadian Action	G.L. Malcolm	308	0.6	–	$2,976
Natural Law	Helene Darisse	245	0.5	–	$0.00
Total valid votes		48,511	100.0		
Total rejected ballots		272			
Turnout		48,783	65.49		
Electors on the lists		74,484			
Sources: Official Results, Elections Canada and Financial Returns, Elections Canada.

1993 Canadian federal election: St. Catharines
Party	Candidate	Votes	%	Expenditures	
Liberal	Walt Lastewka	23,928	48.99		$49,786
Reform	Rob Hesp	14,011	28.69		$31,523
Progressive Conservative	Ken Atkinson	7,448	15.25		$40,187
New Democratic	Jane Hughes	2,799	5.73		$10,877
Christian Heritage	David W. Bylsma	568	1.16		$3,349
Abolitionist	Kevin Doucet	86	0.18		$0
Total valid votes		45,652	100.0		
Total rejected ballots		383			
Total valid votes		49,223	68.44		
Electors on the lists		71,919			
Source: Thirty-fifth General Election, 1993: Official Voting Results, Published by the Chief Electoral Officer of Canada. Financial figures taken from official contributions and expenses provided by Elections Canada.

All electoral information is taken from Elections Canada. Italicized expenditures from elections after 1997 refer to submitted totals, and are presented when the final reviewed totals are not available. Expenditures from 1997 refer to submitted totals.
