= Frederick Harold Avery =

Canadian politician from Ontario

Member of the Ontario Provincial Parliament for Lincoln
- In office June 19, 1934 – August 25, 1937
- Preceded by: Sidney Wilson
- Succeeded by: Archibald Haines

Personal details
- Party: Liberal

Frederick Harold Avery was a Canadian politician who was Liberal MPP for Lincoln from 1934 to 1937.

== See also ==
- 19th Parliament of Ontario
