= St. Catharines (provincial electoral district) =

Provincial electoral district in Ontario, Canada

Coordinates: 43.165°N 79.234°W

Ontario electoral district
- St. Catharines in relation to other southern Ontario electoral districts

Provincial electoral district
- Legislature: Legislative Assembly of Ontario
MPP
Jennie Stevens
New Democratic
- District created: 1966
- First contested: 1967
- Last contested: 2025

Demographics
- Population (2016): 111,690
- Electors (2018): 89,924
- Area (km²): 84
- Pop. density (per km²): 1,329.6
- Census division: Niagara
- Census subdivision: St. Catharines

St. Catharines is a provincial electoral district in Ontario, Canada, that has been represented in the Legislative Assembly of Ontario, first from 1914 to 1934, and again from 1967.

The riding was redrawn in 1999, when Ontario adjusted all of its provincial electoral divisions to match those already existing at the federal level, and has matched the federal riding since. It currently consists of the part of the city of St. Catharines lying north of a line drawn from west to east along St. Paul Street West, St. Paul Crescent, Twelve Mile Creek, Glendale Avenue, Merrit Street, and Glendale Avenue.

== Members of Provincial Parliament ==
=== 1914–1934 ===
The riding was severed from Lincoln in 1914, and was merged back into that riding for the 1934 election.

St. Catharines
Assembly	Years	Member	Party
Riding created (1914)
14th	1914–1919	Elisha Jessop	Conservative
15th	1919–1923	Frank Howard Greenlaw	Labour
16th	1923–1926	Edwin Cyrus Graves	Conservative
17th	1926–1929	Edwin Cyrus Graves	Independent-Conservative
18th	1929–1934	Edwin Cyrus Graves	Conservative

=== 1967 to present ===
The riding was recreated once more from Lincoln for the 1967 election.

St. Catharines
Assembly	Years	Member	Party
Riding created
28th	1967–1971	Robert Mercer Johnston	Progressive Conservative
29th	1971–1975	Robert Mercer Johnston	Progressive Conservative
30th	1975–1977	Robert Mercer Johnston	Progressive Conservative
31st	1977–1981	Jim Bradley	Liberal
32nd	1981–1985	Jim Bradley	Liberal
33rd	1985–1987	Jim Bradley	Liberal
34th	1987–1990	Jim Bradley	Liberal
35th	1990–1995	Jim Bradley	Liberal
36th	1995–1999	Jim Bradley	Liberal
37th	1999–2003	Jim Bradley	Liberal
38th	2003–2007	Jim Bradley	Liberal
39th	2007–2011	Jim Bradley	Liberal
40th	2011–2014	Jim Bradley	Liberal
41st	2014–2018	Jim Bradley	Liberal
42nd	2018–2022	Jennie Stevens	New Democratic
43rd	2022–2025	Jennie Stevens	New Democratic
44th	2025–present	Jennie Stevens	New Democratic

== Election results ==
Winning party in each polling division of St. Catharines at the 2025 Ontario general election

2025 Ontario general election
Party	Candidate	Votes	%	±%	Expenditures
New Democratic	Jennie Stevens	19,688	42.12	+2.41	$66,956
Progressive Conservative	Sal Sorrento	16,422	35.13	+0.70	$73,420
Liberal	Robin McPherson	8,092	17.31	+0.68	$72,064
Green	Stephen Vincelette-Smith	1,033	2.21	–1.88	$567
New Blue	Rob Atalick	807	1.73	–0.83	$4,178
Stop the New Sex-Ed Agenda	Natalia Benoit	347	0.74	–	$0
Ontario Party	Liz Leeuwenburg	300	0.64	–0.78	$0
Ontario Alliance	J. Justin O'Donnell	56	0.12	+0.05	
Total valid votes/expense limit		46,745	99.28	–	$151,984
Total rejected, unmarked and declined ballots		340	0.72	+0.21	
Turnout		47,085	49.88	+3.22	
Eligible voters		94,400			
New Democratic hold		Swing		+0.85	
Source: Elections Ontario

Winning party in each polling division of St. Catharines at the 2022 Ontario general election

2022 Ontario general election
Party	Candidate	Votes	%	±%	Expenditures
New Democratic	Jennie Stevens	17,128	39.71	+3.09	$72,978
Progressive Conservative	Sal Sorrento	14,851	34.43	+0.83	$68,299
Liberal	Ryan Madill	7,175	16.63	–7.90	$78,102
Green	Michele Braniff	1,764	4.09	+0.37	$25
New Blue	Keith McDonald	1,103	2.56	–	$15
Ontario Party	Michael Goddard	613	1.42	–	none listed
Libertarian	Judi Falardeau	372	0.86	+0.48	none listed
Communist	Rin Simon	99	0.23	+0.10	none listed
Ontario Alliance	J. Justin O'Donnell	31	0.07	–	$0
Total valid votes		43,136	99.48		
Total rejected, unmarked and declined ballots		224	0.52	–0.55	
Turnout		43,360	46.66	–11.39	
Eligible voters		92,924			
New Democratic hold		Swing		+1.13	
Source: Elections Ontario

2018 Ontario general election
Party	Candidate	Votes	%	±%	Expenditures
New Democratic	Jennie Stevens	18,911	36.61	+12.01	$8,736
Progressive Conservative	Sandie Bellows	17,353	33.60	+4.28	$41,729
Liberal	Jim Bradley	12,671	24.53	–16.67	$77,481
Green	Colin Ryrie	1,923	3.72	–0.11	$10
None of the Above	Jim Fannon	494	0.96	–	$27,700
Libertarian	Daniel Tisi	195	0.38	–	none listed
Communist	Saleh Waziruddin	66	0.13	–	none listed
Cultural Action	Duke Willis	37	0.07	–	none listed
Total valid votes		51,650	98.94		
Total rejected, unmarked and declined ballots		556	1.07		
Turnout		52,206	58.06		
Eligible voters		89,924			
New Democratic notional gain from Liberal		Swing		+14.34	
Source: Elections Ontario

2014 general election redistributed results
Party	Vote	%
Liberal	18,809	41.20
Progressive Conservative	13,386	29.32
New Democratic	11,231	24.60
Green	1,751	3.84
Others	475	1.04

2014 Ontario general election
Party	Candidate	Votes	%	±%
Liberal	Jim Bradley	19,070	41.00	+0.79
Progressive Conservative	Mat Siscoe	13,814	29.70	–6.51
New Democratic	Jennie Stevens	11,350	24.40	+4.20
Green	Karen Fraser	1,792	3.85	+1.36
Libertarian	Nicholas Dushko	223	0.48	–
Freedom	Dave Unrau	170	0.37	+0.23
Communist	Saleh Waziruddin	95	0.20	+0.04
Total valid votes		46,514	98.47	
Total rejected, unmarked and declined ballots		725	1.53	+1.10
Turnout		47,239	54.80	+3.80
Eligible voters		86,198		
Liberal hold		Swing		+3.65
Source: Elections Ontario

2011 Ontario general election
Party	Candidate	Votes	%	±%
Liberal	Jim Bradley	17,166	40.21	–7.03
Progressive Conservative	Sandie Bellows	15,461	36.21	+7.32
New Democratic	Irene Lowell	8,624	20.20	+4.32
Green	Jennifer Mooradian	1,066	2.50	–4.58
Family Coalition	Chris Clarke	191	0.45	–0.15
Communist	Saleh Waziruddin	68	0.16	–0.15
Canadians' Choice	Jon Radick	62	0.15	–
Freedom	Dave Unrau	57	0.13	–
Total valid votes		42,695	99.56	
Total rejected, unmarked and declined ballots		188	0.44	–0.20
Turnout		42,883	51.00	–2.82
Eligible voters		84,078		
Liberal hold		Swing		–7.17
Source: Elections Ontario

2007 Ontario general election
Party	Candidate	Votes	%	±%	Expenditures
Liberal	Jim Bradley	21,029	47.23	–10.21	$60,133.56
Progressive Conservative	Bruce Timms	12,864	28.89	–0.45	$33,521.98
New Democratic	Henry Bosch	7,069	15.88	+6.93	$11,300.79
Green	Byrne Smith	3,152	7.08	+4.43	$2,172.38
Family Coalition	Barra L. Gots	267	0.60	–1.02	$0.00
Communist	Samuel Frank Hammond	139	0.31	–	$826.44
Total valid votes		44,520	99.37		
Total rejected, unmarked and declined ballots		284	0.63	+0.02	
Turnout		44,804	53.83	–2.60	
Eligible voters		83,239			
Liberal hold		Swing		–4.88	
Source: Elections Ontario

2003 Ontario general election
Party	Candidate	Votes	%	±%	Expenditures
Liberal	Jim Bradley	25,319	57.44	+3.54	$63,576.04
Progressive Conservative	Mark Brickell	12,932	29.34	–9.17	$72,267.48
New Democratic	John Bacher	3,944	8.95	+2.74	$8,542.84
Green	Jim Fannon	1,167	2.65	+2.19	$2,858.89
Family Coalition	Linda Klassen	714	1.62	–	$13.80
Total valid votes		44,076	99.39		
Total rejected, unmarked and declined ballots		271	0.61	–0.10	
Turnout		44,347	56.43	–3.18	
Eligible voters		78,591			
Liberal hold		Swing		+6.36	
Source: Elections Ontario

1999 Ontario general election
Party	Candidate	Votes	%	±%	Expenditures
Liberal	Jim Bradley	25,186	53.90	+7.37	$45,478.14
Progressive Conservative	Tom Froese	17,994	38.51	–0.33	$68,831.44
New Democratic	Gordon Coggins	2,902	6.21	–7.07	$8,286.11
Natural Law	Helene Ann Darisse	272	0.58	+0.06	$0.00
Green	Douglas Woodard	215	0.46	–	$83.93
Independent (Marxist-Leninist)	Ron J. Walker	154	0.33	–	$112.00
Total valid votes		46,723	99.29		
Total rejected, unmarked and declined ballots		336	0.71	–0.05	
Turnout		47,059	59.61	–4.97	
Eligible voters		78,946			
Liberal hold		Swing		+3.85	
Source: Elections Ontario

1995 Ontario general election
Party	Candidate	Votes	%	±%	Expenditures
Liberal	Jim Bradley	13,761	46.53	+7.77	$33,835.95
Progressive Conservative	Archie Heide	11,486	38.84	+25.68	$36,875.32
New Democratic	Jeff Burch	3,929	13.29	–22.34	$12,043.92
Family Coalition	Jon Siemens	245	0.83	–3.63	$0.00
Natural Law	Marcy Sheremetta	153	0.52	–	$0.00
Total valid votes		29,574	99.24		
Total rejected, unmarked and declined ballots		227	0.76	–0.36	
Turnout		29,801	64.58	–2.19	
Eligible voters		46,146			
Liberal hold		Swing		–8.96	
Source: Elections Ontario

1990 Ontario general election
Party	Candidate	Votes	%	±%
Liberal	Jim Bradley	11,565	38.76	–24.54
New Democratic	Dave Kappele	10,629	35.63	+15.59
Progressive Conservative	Bruce Timms	3,926	13.16	–2.17
Confederation of Regions	Eva Longhurst	2,384	7.99	–
Family Coalition	Bert C. Pynenburg	1,331	4.46	–
Total valid votes		29,835	98.88	
Total rejected, unmarked and declined ballots		337	1.12	+0.53
Turnout		30,172	66.77	+4.34
Eligible voters		45,189		
Liberal hold		Swing		–20.06
Source: Elections Ontario

1987 Ontario general election
Party	Candidate	Votes	%	±%
Liberal	Jim Bradley	17,584	63.30	+5.36
New Democratic	Rob West	5,566	20.04	+4.22
Progressive Conservative	Chuck Bradley	4,258	15.33	–10.06
Communist	Eric Blair	369	1.33	+0.47
Total valid votes		27,777	99.41	
Total rejected ballots		165	0.59	+0.14
Turnout		27,942	62.43	+0.85
Eligible voters		44,758		
Liberal hold		Swing		+0.57
Source: Elections Ontario

1985 Ontario general election
Party	Candidate	Votes	%	±%
Liberal	Jim Bradley	20,605	57.94	+6.09
Progressive Conservative	Elaine Herzog	9,029	25.39	–6.87
New Democratic	Michael Cormier	5,624	15.81	+0.34
Communist	Eric Blair	305	0.86	+0.44
Total valid votes		35,563	99.55	
Rejected, unmarked and declined ballots		201	0.56	
Turnout		35,764	61.65	
Eligible voters		58,015		
Liberal hold		Swing		+6.48
Source: Elections Ontario

1981 Ontario general election
Party	Candidate	Votes	%	±%
Liberal	Jim Bradley	16,509	51.85	+12.96
Progressive Conservative	John Larocque	10,273	32.26	–4.36
New Democratic	Don Loucks	4,927	15.47	–8.24
Communist	Norman J. Newell	132	0.41	–0.36
Total valid votes		31,841	99.54	
Rejected, unmarked and declined ballots		181	0.57	
Turnout		32,022	57.20	
Eligible voters		55,979		
Liberal hold		Swing		+8.66
Source: Elections Ontario

1977 Ontario general election
Party	Candidate	Votes	%	±%
Liberal	Jim Bradley	12,392	38.89	+6.89
Progressive Conservative	Eleanor Lancaster	11,669	36.62	+1.88
New Democratic	Fred Dickson	7,556	23.71	–8.10
Communist	Eric Blair	247	0.78	–0.01
Total valid votes		31,864	99.44	
Rejected, unmarked and declined ballots		213	0.66	
Turnout		32,077	60.91	
Eligible voters		52,660		
Liberal gain from Progressive Conservative		Swing		+2.50
Source: Elections Ontario

1975 Ontario general election
Party	Candidate	Votes	%	±%
Progressive Conservative	Robert Mercer Johnston	10,064	34.74	–9.18
Liberal	J. A. Rochefort	9,270	32.00	+4.46
New Democratic	Fred Dickson	9,215	31.81	+3.27
Communist	Bruce Magnuson	227	0.78	–
North American Labour	Lucylle Boikoff	192	0.66	–
Total valid votes		28,968	99.28	
Rejected, unmarked and declined ballots		253	1.1	
Turnout		29,221	59.78	
Eligible voters		48,885		
Progressive Conservative hold		Swing		–6.82
Source: Elections Ontario

1971 Ontario general election
Party	Candidate	Votes	%	±%
Progressive Conservative	Robert Mercer Johnston	16,074	43.92	–1.98
New Democratic	Marvin Blauer	10,447	28.54	+5.53
Liberal	Jim Bradley	10,080	27.54	–3.55
Total valid votes		36,601	99.37	
Total rejected ballots		233	0.63	–0.54
Turnout		36,834	68.01	+7.02
Eligible voters		54,157		
Progressive Conservative hold		Swing		–3.76
Source: Elections Ontario

1967 Ontario general election
Party	Candidate	Votes	%
Progressive Conservative	Robert Mercer Johnston	12,235	45.90
Liberal	Jim Bradley	8,287	31.09
New Democratic	Bill Cousintine	6,134	23.01
Total valid votes		26,656	98.82
Total rejected ballots		317	1.18
Turnout		26,973	60.99
Eligible voters		44,226	
Progressive Conservative pickup new district.			
Source: Elections Ontario

=== 1914–1934 ===
1929 Ontario general election
Party	Candidate	Votes	%	±%
Conservative	Edwin Cyrus Graves	5,562	53.99	–18.92
Independent Conservative	Jacob Smith	4,740	46.01	–
Total valid votes		10,302	99.04	
Total rejected ballots		100	0.96	+0.22
Turnout		10,402	49.54	–10.97
Eligible voters		20,997		
Conservative gain from Independent Conservative		Swing		–
Source: Elections Ontario

1926 Ontario general election
Party	Candidate	Votes	%	±%
Independent Conservative	Edwin Cyrus Graves	8,669	72.91	+17.10
Prohibitionist	George Arthur Robertson	3,221	27.09	–
Total valid votes		11,890	99.26	
Total rejected ballots		89	0.74	–0.43
Turnout		11,979	60.51	+10.61
Eligible voters		19,797		
Independent Conservative hold		Swing		+8.55
Source: Elections Ontario

1923 Ontario general election
Party	Candidate	Votes	%	±%
Conservative	Edwin Cyrus Graves	5,364	55.81	+21.71
Liberal	Joseph Misset Mussen	2,874	29.90	+12.67
Labour	Frank Howard Greenlaw	1,374	14.29	–34.38
Total valid votes		9,612	98.83	
Total rejected ballots		114	1.17	–1.69
Turnout		9,726	49.90	–30.52
Eligible voters		19,491		
Conservative gain from Labour		Swing		+28.05
Source: Elections Ontario

1919 Ontario general election
Party	Candidate	Votes	%	±%
Labour	Frank Howard Greenlaw	6,313	48.67	–
Conservative	Frederick Raymond Parnell	4,422	34.09	–16.76
Liberal	Joseph Edward Masters	2,235	17.23	–
Total valid votes		12,970	97.14	
Total rejected ballots		382	2.86	+2.86
Turnout		13,352	80.42	–
Eligible voters		16,603		
Labour gain from Conservative		Swing		–
Source: Elections Ontario

Ontario provincial by-election, February 15, 1919 Death of Elisha Jessop
Party	Candidate	Votes	%	±%
Conservative	Frederick Raymond Parnell	5,154	50.86	–17.36
Unknown	William Longden	4,980	49.14	–
Total valid votes		10,134	100.00	
Total rejected ballots		–		
Turnout		10,134	–	–
Eligible voters				
Conservative hold		Swing		–8.68
Source: Elections Ontario

1914 Ontario general election
Party	Candidate	Votes	%
Conservative	Elisha Jessop	2,863	68.22
Labour	James A. Wiley	1,334	31.78
Total valid votes		4,197	99.06
Total rejected ballots		40	0.94
Turnout		4,237	67.09
Eligible voters		6,315	
Conservative pickup new district.			
Source: Elections Ontario

== 2007 electoral reform referendum ==
2007 Ontario electoral reform referendum
Side	Votes	%
First Past the Post	26,589	61.5
Mixed member proportional	16,626	38.5
Total valid votes	43,215	100.0

== See also ==
- List of Ontario provincial electoral districts
- Canadian provincial electoral districts
