= Sidney Wilson (politician) =

Canadian politician from Ontario

Sidney James Wilson

Member of the Ontario Provincial Parliament for Lincoln
- In office September 30, 1929 – April 3, 1934
- Preceded by: Robert Kemp
- Succeeded by: Frederick Harold Avery

Personal details
- Party: Progressive Conservative

Sidney James Wilson was a Canadian politician from the Progressive Conservative Party of Ontario. He represented Lincoln in the Legislative Assembly of Ontario from 1929 to 1934.

== See also ==
- 18th Parliament of Ontario
