= Robert Kemp (Canadian politician) =

Canadian politician from Ontario

Robert Henry Kemp

Member of the Ontario Provincial Parliament for Lincoln
- In office June 25, 1923 – September 17, 1929
- Preceded by: Thomas Marshall
- Succeeded by: Sidney Wilson

Personal details
- Party: Liberal-Progressive (1926-1929)
- Other political affiliations: United Farmers of Ontario (until 1926)

Robert Henry Kemp was a Canadian politician from Ontario. He represented Lincoln in the Legislative Assembly of Ontario from 1923 to 1929.

== See also ==
- 16th Parliament of Ontario
- 17th Parliament of Ontario
