= Bob Welch (politician) =

Canadian politician

Bob Welch OC
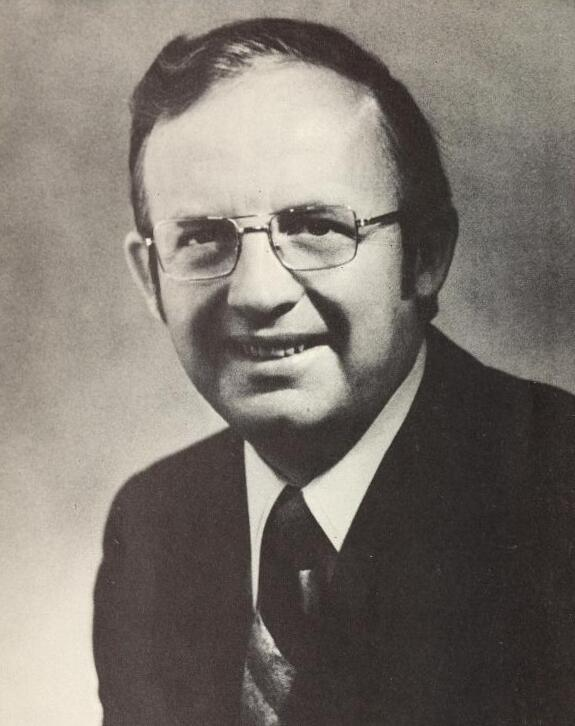
- Welch, c. 1971

1st Deputy Premier of Ontario
- In office September 21, 1977 – May 17, 1985
- Premier: Bill Davis; Frank Miller
- Preceded by: Position established
- Succeeded by: Bette Stephenson

Ontario MPP
- In office 1975–1985
- Preceded by: Riding established
- Succeeded by: Peter Partington
- Constituency: Brock
- In office 1963–1975
- Preceded by: Charles Daley
- Succeeded by: Ross Hall
- Constituency: Lincoln

Personal details
- Born: Robert Stanley Kemp Welch; July 13, 1928; St. Catharines, Ontario, Canada
- Died: July 29, 2000 (aged 72); St. Catharines, Ontario, Canada
- Political party: Progressive Conservative
- Occupation: Lawyer, lay preacher

Robert Stanley Kemp Welch OC (July 13, 1928 – July 29, 2000) was a Canadian politician. He served in the Legislative Assembly of Ontario from 1963 to 1985 as a member of the Progressive Conservative Party, and was a cabinet minister in the governments of John Robarts, Bill Davis and Frank Miller.

== Biography ==
=== Early life ===
Welch was born in St. Catharines, the son of a railway brakeman. He received a Bachelor of Arts degree from McMaster University in Hamilton, and a Bachelor of Laws degree from Osgoode Hall Law School in Toronto. He worked as a barrister and solicitor after his graduation, and was a member of that St. Catharines Board of Education from 1955 until 1963. Welch was also a lay preacher in the Anglican church, and served as chancellor of the Anglican Diocese in Niagara from 1965 to 1992.

=== Political career ===
He was elected to the Ontario legislature in the 1963 provincial election, winning a convincing victory in the rural, southwestern Ontario constituency of Lincoln. After serving as a backbench supporter of the Robarts government for two years, he was named to cabinet on November 24, 1966 as Provincial Secretary (Ontario) and Minister of Citizenship. Welch was re-elected by a landslide in the 1967 provincial election, and was retained in both portfolios.

==== Leadership campaign ====
When Robarts retired, Welch ran to succeed him in the 1971 Ontario Progressive Conservative leadership convention. He was often depicted as a "consensus candidate", and was criticized for not debating policy issues. His campaign organization was initially weak, but received an unexpected boost from four of Robarts' senior advisors. Some have speculated that Robarts only intended to give Welch's campaign the appearance of strength, such that frontrunner Bill Davis would not appear to win the leadership by default. Welch proved a likeable figure and a good speaker, and built a base of delegate support at the expense of rival candidate Darcy McKeough.

He finished fourth on the first ballot (three votes behind McKeough), and was eliminated after the second. Despite rumours that he would support McKeough, he remained neutral after his elimination and released his delegates. Davis was elected on the fourth ballot, defeating upstart candidate Allan Lawrence by 44 votes.

==== Davis years ====
Welch became part of the new premier's inner circle of advisors and was often used as a "fixer" in the Davis government, taking temporary placements in difficult portfolios as a crisis manager. Davis initially named Welch to be his own successor as Education Minister on March 1, 1971. In this capacity, he was responsible for drafting policy guidelines on funding for Ontario's Roman Catholic school system. After another convincing victory in the 1971 provincial election, he was named as Provincial Secretary for Social Development on February 2, 1972.

The Social Development portfolio was a newly created "super-ministry", and was intended to provide Welch with supervisory powers over the departments of Education, Health, Universities and Colleges and Social and Family Services. Though it was a powerful position in principle, it carried no direct administrative responsibilities and led to a reduced profile for the minister. Welch was often forced to remain silent in the legislative question period, while ministers under his watch responded to members of the opposition. He returned to a higher profile position on November 7, 1973, when Davis gave him additional responsibilities as Minister of Housing. In this capacity, he oversaw the cancellation of the Davis government's "Cedarwood" project near Pickering.

Following a cabinet shuffle on February 26, 1974, Welch was promoted to Attorney General and Provincial Secretary for Justice. The latter position gave him supervisory powers over the departments of Correctional Services, Consumer and Corporate Affairs and the Solicitor General. He was also named Minister of Culture and Recreation on January 14, 1975, and was relieved of his other two positions on July 18 of the same year.

The Progressive Conservatives were reduced to a minority government in the 1975 provincial election, but remained in power due to divisions among the opposition parties. Welch was re-elected for the newly created Brock constituency, while the redistributed division of Lincoln was won by the Liberal Party. Welch was appointed Government House Leader after the election, giving him the responsibility for working with opposition parties to ensure the passage of government legislation. He was also retained as Culture and Recreation Minister, and served as Commissioner of the Board of Internal Economy from November 4, 1975 to April 29, 1977.

The 1977 provincial election yielded another minority government for the Progressive Conservatives. Welch remained Culture and Tourism minister until August 16, 1978, when he was re-appointed as Provincial Secretary for Justice. He held this position until August 30, 1979, when he was named Minister of Energy. He also became Ontario's Deputy Premier on September 21, 1977, although this was not a cabinet position at the time.

The Progressive Conservatives were returned to power with a majority government in the 1981 election. Welch remained Deputy Premier throughout the legislative session that followed, and saw the position elevated to cabinet level by an order in council of June 21, 1983. He also remained Energy Minister until July 6 of the same year, and was named as Minister responsible for Women's Issues on May 17, 1983. In the latter position, Welch announced plans to study and reduce the wage gap between male and female workers.

===== Cabinet posts =====
Ontario provincial government of Frank Miller
Cabinet post (1)
Predecessor	Office	Successor
Roy McMurtry	Attorney General; 1985 (February–May)	Alan Pope
Ontario provincial government of Bill Davis
Cabinet posts (8)
Predecessor	Office	Successor
James Auld	Minister of Energy; 1979-1983	Philip Andrewes
New position	Deputy Premier; 1977-1985	Bette Stephenson
George Kerr	Provincial Secretary for Justice; 1978-1979	John Clement
New position	Minister of Culture and Recreation; 1975-1978	Reuben Baetz
Dalton Bales	Attorney General; 1975-1978; Also Provincial Secretary for Justice	John Clement
New position	Minister of Housing; 1973-1974	John Rhodes
New position	Provincial Secretary for Social Development; 1972-1974	Margaret Birch
Bill Davis	Minister of Education; 1971-1972	Thomas Wells
Ontario provincial government of John Robarts
Cabinet post (1)
Predecessor	Office	Successor
John Yaremko	Provincial Secretary and Minister of Citizenship; 1966-1971	John Yaremko

==== Miller premiership ====
Welch supported Dennis Timbrell's unsuccessful campaign to succeed Davis as party leader in 1985. When Frank Miller was sworn in as premier on February 8, 1985, he kept Welch as deputy premier and also re-appointed him to the office of Attorney-General. Welch was also named Government House Leader on February 20. He did not contest the 1985 provincial election, and formally resigned from cabinet on May 17.

==== Retirement ====
Welch returned to his law practice after leaving politics, and served as chancellor of Brock University from 1985 until his death in 2000. In 1993, he was made an Officer of the Order of Canada.
