= Ken Atkinson =

Canadian politician

Kenneth David Atkinson

Member of the Canadian Parliament for St. Catharines
- In office 1988–1993
- Preceded by: Joseph Reid
- Succeeded by: Walt Lastewka

Personal details
- Born: March 2, 1947 (age 79) St. Catharines, Ontario
- Party: Progressive Conservative
- Committees: Chair, Subcommittee on the St. Lawrence Seaway of the Standing Committee on Transport

Kenneth David Atkinson (born March 2, 1947) is a former Canadian politician. He represented the federal riding of St. Catharines on behalf of the Progressive Conservative Party for one term, from 1988 to 1993.

He lost his seat to Liberal candidate Walt Lastewka in the 1993 federal election.
