= Joseph Reid (politician) =

Canadian politician

Member of Parliament for St. Catharines
- In office 1979–1988
- Preceded by: Gilbert Parent
- Succeeded by: Ken Atkinson

54th Mayor of St. Catharines
- In office 1973–1976
- Preceded by: Mackenzie Chown
- Succeeded by: Roy Adams

Personal details
- Born: Joseph Lloyd Reid; 24 September 1917 Govan, Saskatchewan, Canada
- Died: 14 August 2015 (aged 97) St. Catharines, Ontario, Canada
- Party: Progressive Conservative Party

Joseph Lloyd Reid (24 September 1917 – 14 August 2015) was a Canadian politician. He was a Progressive Conservative member of the House of Commons of Canada. He was a lawyer by career.

Reid was president of the St. Catharines Chamber of Commerce in the mid-1960s and was the city's mayor from 1973 to 1976. He represented the riding of St. Catharines, Ontario, where he was first elected in 1979. Reid was re-elected in 1980 and 1984, thus serving three successive terms from the 31st to the 33rd Canadian Parliaments. Reid left national politics in 1988 and did not run in that year's federal election.
