= Charles Daley =

Canadian politician

Ontario MPP
- In office 1943–1963
- Preceded by: Archie Haines
- Succeeded by: Bob Welch
- Constituency: Lincoln

Personal details
- Born: July 27, 1890 St. Catharines, Ontario
- Died: August 10, 1976 (aged 86) Toronto, Ontario
- Party: Progressive Conservative
- Children: 4
- Occupation: Carpenter

Charles "Tod" Daley, (July 27, 1890 – August 10, 1976) was a Canadian politician. He served in the Legislative Assembly of Ontario from 1943 to 1963 as a member of the Progressive Conservative Party and was a cabinet minister in the governments of George Drew, Thomas, and Leslie Frost.

== Background ==
Daley was born in St. Catharines in 1890. He served in the First World War.

== Politics ==
He was elected alderman of St. Catharines in 1935 and later became mayor of the city.

He was elected to the Ontario legislature in the 1943 provincial election in the local southwestern Ontario riding of Lincoln. Two weeks after the election he was appointed to George Drew's Cabinet as Minister of Labour.

He served in that role for the next 18 years through three successive premiers. When John Robarts took power in 1961 he was retained in Cabinet as a Minister without portfolio. He retired before the 1963 election.

=== Cabinet positions ===
Frost ministry, Province of Ontario (1949–1961)
Kennedy ministry, Province of Ontario (1948–1949)
Drew ministry, Province of Ontario (1943–1948)
Cabinet post (1)
Predecessor	Office	Successor
Peter Heenan	Minister of Labour; 1943 - 1961	Bill Warrender
Sub-Cabinet Post
Predecessor	Title	Successor
	Minister without portfolio (1961-1963)	

== Later life ==
After retiring from politics, he served on the Niagara Parks Commission and the Niagara Falls Bridge Commission. He died in hospital in Toronto, Ontario at age 86.
