= Ross Hall (politician) =

Canadian politician (1925–1999)

Mayor of Grimsby, Ontario
- In office 1982–1988
- Preceded by: Robert Arkell
- Succeeded by: Nick Andreychuk
- Constituency: Lincoln

Ontario MPP
- In office 1975–1981
- Preceded by: Bob Welch
- Succeeded by: Philip Andrewes
- Constituency: Lincoln

Personal details
- Born: May 5, 1925 Toronto, Ontario
- Died: October 11, 1999 (aged 74) Grimsby, Ontario
- Party: Liberal
- Spouse: Alison Jeffries
- Children: 3
- Occupation: Businessman

Eric Ross Hall (May 5, 1925 – October 11, 1999) was a politician in Ontario, Canada. He was a Liberal member of the Legislative Assembly of Ontario from 1975 to 1981 who represented the riding of Lincoln. From 1982 to 1988 he was mayor of Grimsby, Ontario and regional councillor in Niagara.

== Background ==
Hall was born in Toronto, Ontario in 1925. He attended Humbercrest Public School where he met his future wife Alison Jeffries. They married shortly after graduating from university and moved to Grimsby, Ontario. Hall founded a Hall-Ogilvie Ltd. a small construction company. Together with his wife Alison, they raised three children. He died at West Lincoln Memorial Hospital in Grimsby, Ontario on Canadian Thanksgiving Day, 1999.

== Politics ==
In the 1975 provincial election, he ran as the Liberal in the Niagara Peninsula riding of Lincoln. He defeated Progressive Conservative candidate Paul Prince by 1,094 votes. He was re-elected in 1977. In 1981 he was challenged by PC candidate Philip Andrewes and narrowly defeated by 333 votes.

During his time in office he served as housing critic and was chair of the Liberal caucus.

After his defeat he wanted to retire from politics but was persuaded to stand for Mayor of Grimsby in 1982. He defeated incumbent Robert Arkell. He served for six years and retired in 1988.
