= Philip Andrewes =

Canadian politician

The Honourable Philip Andrewes ECO
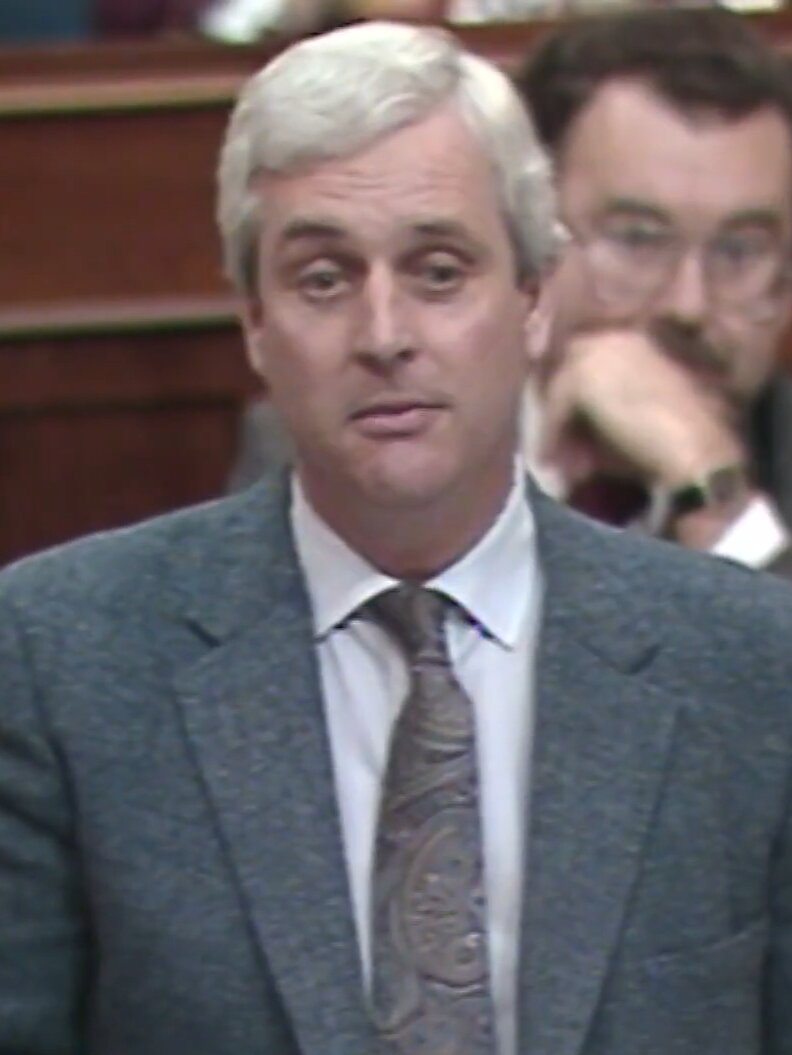
- Andrewes in 1986

Member of Provincial Parliament for Lincoln
- In office 1981–1987
- Preceded by: Ross Hall
- Succeeded by: Harry Pelissero

Personal details
- Born: September 6, 1941 (age 84) Beamsville
- Party: Progressive Conservative
- Occupation: Farmer

Philip W. Andrewes (September 6, 1941) is a former politician in Ontario, Canada. He served in the Legislative Assembly of Ontario from 1981 to 1987, and was a cabinet minister in the governments of Bill Davis and Frank Miller. Andrewes was a member of the Progressive Conservative Party.

== Early life ==
Andrewes was born in Beamsville, Ontario, and received a Bachelor of Science degree from the Ontario Agricultural College at the University of Guelph. He worked as a fruit grower before entering political life.

== Political career ==
He was elected to the Ontario legislature in the 1981 provincial election, defeating Liberal incumbent Ross Hall by 394 votes in the Lincoln constituency. He was appointed to Davis's cabinet on July 6, 1983 as Minister of Energy. Andrewes supported Frank Miller to succeed Davis in the Progressive Conservative Party's January 1985 leadership convention, and was appointed Minister of Agriculture and Food when Miller became Premier of Ontario on February 8, 1985.

Andrewes was re-elected in the 1985 election with an increased plurality, although the Progressive Conservatives were reduced to a fragile minority government in the legislature. He was promoted to Minister of Health on May 17, 1985, but accomplished little in the department before the Conservatives were defeated in the legislature a month later. In opposition, Andrewes served as his party's critic for Health and Energy.

He lost the Lincoln constituency by 1,036 votes to Liberal Harry Pelissero by in the 1987 election, amid a Liberal sweep of the province.

=== Cabinet positions ===
Miller ministry, Province of Ontario (1985)
Cabinet posts (2)
| Predecessor | Office | Successor |
|---|---|---|
| Alan Pope | Minister of Health; 1985 (May–June) | Murray Elston |
| Dennis Timbrell | Minister of Agriculture and Food; 1985 (February–May) | Ross Stevenson |
Davis ministry, Province of Ontario (1971–1985)
Cabinet post (1)
| Predecessor | Office | Successor |
| Bob Welch | Minister of Energy; 1983–1985 | George Ashe |

== After politics ==
After leaving politics, he served for many years as chair of the board of directors for Agricorp, an Ontario crown corporation. He stepped down in 2005.
