= Lincoln (provincial electoral district) =

Former provincial electoral district in Ontario, Canada

Ontario electoral district

Defunct provincial electoral district
- Legislature: Legislative Assembly of Ontario
- First contested: 1867
- Last contested: 1995

Lincoln is a historical provincial electoral division in Ontario, Canada, which was represented in the Legislative Assembly of Ontario between 1867 and 1999. It was located on the Niagara Peninsula.

At various times, there was also a federal electoral district of the same name represented in the House of Commons.

There was also a Lincoln district used to elect members of the Legislative Assembly of Upper Canada starting in 1792.

== Members of Provincial Parliament ==
Lincoln
Assembly	Years	Member	Party
1st	1867–1871	John Charles Rykert	Conservative
2nd	1871–1874	John Charles Rykert	Conservative
3rd	1875–1879	Sylvester Neelon	Liberal
4th	1879–1883	Sylvester Neelon	Liberal
5th	1883–1886	Sylvester Neelon	Liberal
6th	1886–1890	William Garson	Liberal
7th	1890–1894	James Hiscott	Conservative
8th	1894–1898	James Hiscott	Conservative
9th	1898–1902	Elisha Jessop	Conservative
10th	1902–1904	Elisha Jessop	Conservative
11th	1905–1908	Elisha Jessop	Conservative
12th	1908–1911	Elisha Jessop	Conservative
13th	1911–1914	Elisha Jessop	Conservative
14th	1914–1919	Thomas Marshall	Liberal
15th	1919–1923	Thomas Marshall	Liberal
16th	1923–1926	Robert Kemp	United Farmers
17th	1926–1929	Robert Kemp	Progressive
18th	1929–1934	Sidney Wilson	Conservative
19th	1934–1937	Frederick Avery	Liberal
20th	1937–1942	Archibald Haines	Liberal
21st	1943–1945	Charles Daley	Progressive Conservative
22nd	1945–1948	Charles Daley	Progressive Conservative
23rd	1948–1951	Charles Daley	Progressive Conservative
24th	1951–1955	Charles Daley	Progressive Conservative
25th	1955–1959	Charles Daley	Progressive Conservative
26th	1959–1963	Charles Daley	Progressive Conservative
27th	1963–1967	Bob Welch	Progressive Conservative
28th	1967–1971	Bob Welch	Progressive Conservative
29th	1971–1975	Bob Welch	Progressive Conservative
30th	1975–1977	Ross Hall	Liberal
31st	1977–1981	Ross Hall	Liberal
32nd	1981–1985	Philip Andrewes	Progressive Conservative
33rd	1985–1987	Philip Andrewes	Progressive Conservative
34th	1987–1990	Harry Pelissero	Liberal
35th	1990–1995	Ron Hansen	New Democratic
36th	1995–1999	Frank Sheehan	Progressive Conservative
Riding merged into Erie—Lincoln, Niagara Centre, St. Catharines and Stoney Creek

== Election results ==
1995 Ontario general election
Party	Candidate	Votes	%	±%	Expenditures
Progressive Conservative	Frank Sheehan	18,709	50.68	+23.13	$44,992.99
Liberal	Harry Pelissero	10,876	29.46	–2.92	$36,631.91
New Democratic	Ron Hansen	5,800	15.71	–19.78	$19,168.08
Family Coalition	Tristan Emmanuel	1,241	3.36	–	$3,872.39
Natural Law	Mary L. Glasser	288	0.78	–	$0
Total valid votes		36,914	99.15		
Total rejected, unmarked and declined ballots		317	0.85	–0.67	
Turnout		37,231	68.09	+0.02	
Eligible voters		54,677			
Progressive Conservative gain from New Democratic		Swing		+21.46	
Source: Elections Ontario

1990 Ontario general election
Party	Candidate	Votes	%	±%
New Democratic	Ron Hansen	12,117	35.49	+14.67
Liberal	Harry Pelissero	11,055	32.38	–8.95
Progressive Conservative	Carol Walker	9,407	27.55	–10.30
Confederation of Regions	Doug Boughner	1,562	4.58	–
Total valid votes		34,141	98.47	
Total rejected, unmarked and declined ballots		529	1.53	+1.06
Turnout		34,670	68.07	+2.83
Eligible voters		50,933		
New Democratic gain from Liberal		Swing		+12.48
Source: Elections Ontario

1987 Ontario general election
Party	Candidate	Votes	%	±%
Liberal	Harry Pelissero	12,320	41.33	+4.62
Progressive Conservative	Philip Andrewes	11,284	37.85	–11.99
New Democratic	Ron Hansen	6,207	20.82	+11.59
Total valid votes		29,811	99.54	
Total rejected ballots		139	0.46	+0.12
Turnout		29,950	65.24	–2.52
Eligible voters		45,905		
Liberal gain from Progressive Conservative		Swing		+8.31
Source: Elections Ontario

1985 Ontario general election
Party	Candidate	Votes	%	±%
Progressive Conservative	Philip Andrewes	12,226	49.84	+3.56
Liberal	Gladys Huffman	9,004	36.71	–7.76
New Democratic	Barbara Mersereau	2,264	9.23	–0.03
Independent	Ken Lee	1,036	4.22	–
Total valid votes		24,530	99.66	
Total rejected ballots		84	0.34	–0.08
Turnout		24,614	67.76	+2.29
Eligible voters		36,325		
Progressive Conservative hold		Swing		+5.66
Source: Elections Ontario

1981 Ontario general election
Party	Candidate	Votes	%	±%
Progressive Conservative	Philip Andrewes	10,044	46.28	+3.92
Liberal	Ross Hall	9,650	44.46	–0.52
New Democratic	Paavo Vuorinen	2,009	9.26	–3.40
Total valid votes		21,703	99.58	
Total rejected ballots		92	0.42	+0.06
Turnout		21,795	65.47	–5.39
Eligible voters		33,288		
Progressive Conservative gain from Liberal		Swing		+2.22
Source: Elections Ontario

1977 Ontario general election
Party	Candidate	Votes	%	±%
Liberal	Ross Hall	9,969	44.98	+2.14
Progressive Conservative	Ron Southward	9,387	42.36	+4.73
New Democratic	Barbara Mersereau	2,806	12.66	–6.87
Total valid votes		22,162	99.64	
Total rejected ballots		81	0.36	–0.04
Turnout		22,243	70.87	+1.09
Eligible voters		31,387		
Liberal hold		Swing		–1.29
Source: Elections Ontario

1975 Ontario general election
Party	Candidate	Votes	%	±%
Liberal	Ross Hall	8,995	42.84	+22.89
Progressive Conservative	Paul E. Prince	7,901	37.63	–24.91
New Democratic	Ron Leavens	4,100	19.53	+4.93
Total valid votes		20,996	99.60	
Total rejected ballots		85	0.40	–0.35
Turnout		21,081	69.78	–2.60
Eligible voters		30,211		
Liberal gain from Progressive Conservative		Swing		+23.90
Source: Elections Ontario

1971 Ontario general election
Party	Candidate	Votes	%	±%
Progressive Conservative	Bob Welch	19,513	62.54	+3.26
Liberal	Gray Willson	6,224	19.95	–1.11
New Democratic	Arthur Matti Peltomaa	4,556	14.60	–5.06
Independent	Howard A. Prentice	572	1.83	–
Communist	John Donald Clout	336	1.08	–
Total valid votes		31,201	99.25	
Total rejected ballots		237	0.75	–0.05
Turnout		31,438	72.38	+7.49
Eligible voters		43,433		
Progressive Conservative hold		Swing		+2.19
Source: Elections Ontario

1967 Ontario general election
Party	Candidate	Votes	%	±%
Progressive Conservative	Bob Welch	13,334	59.28	+5.28
Liberal	Arnold Usher	4,737	21.06	–13.36
New Democratic	Delby Bucknall	4,424	19.67	+9.82
Total valid votes		22,495	99.20	
Total rejected ballots		182	0.80	–0.13
Turnout		22,677	64.89	+3.70
Eligible voters		34,945		
Progressive Conservative hold		Swing		+9.32
Source: Elections Ontario

1963 Ontario general election
Party	Candidate	Votes	%	±%
Progressive Conservative	Bob Welch	23,229	53.99	+4.42
Liberal	John T. Sullivan	14,807	34.42	+1.28
New Democratic	Frank J. Dyck	4,235	9.84	–7.46
Social Credit	Ed Goertzen	753	1.75	–
Total valid votes		43,024	99.07	
Total rejected ballots		406	0.93	+0.05
Turnout		43,430	61.19	+5.13
Eligible voters		70,973		
Progressive Conservative hold		Swing		+1.57
Source: Elections Ontario

1959 Ontario general election
Party	Candidate	Votes	%	±%
Progressive Conservative	Charles Daley	18,089	49.57	–0.71
Liberal	Walter Theobald	12,091	33.13	–0.69
Co-operative Commonwealth	William Ernest Jones	6,314	17.30	+5.07
Total valid votes		36,494	99.11	
Total rejected ballots		326	0.89	–0.89
Turnout		36,820	56.06	+1.12
Eligible voters		65,680		
Progressive Conservative hold		Swing		–0.01
Source: Elections Ontario

1955 Ontario general election
Party	Candidate	Votes	%	±%
Progressive Conservative	Charles Daley	15,903	50.28	+4.67
Liberal	Fred Cavers	10,699	33.82	+5.56
Co-operative Commonwealth	Joseph David Bacon	3,869	12.23	–11.44
Independent Liberal	Howard A. Prentice	641	2.03	–0.43
Labor–Progressive	Peter Boychuck	519	1.64	–
Total valid votes		31,631	98.23	
Total rejected ballots		571	1.77	+0.41
Turnout		32,202	54.94	–9.89
Eligible voters		58,609		
Progressive Conservative hold		Swing		–0.45
Source: Elections Ontario

1951 Ontario general election
Party	Candidate	Votes	%	±%
Progressive Conservative	Charles Daley	15,477	45.61	+3.92
Liberal	Richard M. Robertson	9,590	28.26	+3.05
Co-operative Commonwealth	C. Peter MacLean	8,032	23.67	–8.08
Independent	Howard A. Prentice	834	2.46	+1.10
Total valid votes		33,933	98.64	
Total rejected ballots		468	1.36	+0.25
Turnout		34,401	64.83	–6.43
Eligible voters		53,062		
Progressive Conservative hold		Swing		+0.44
Source: Elections Ontario

1948 Ontario general election
Party	Candidate	Votes	%	±%
Progressive Conservative	Charles Daley	13,826	41.69	–8.22
Co-operative Commonwealth	C. Peter MacLean	10,529	31.75	+11.01
Liberal	Frank J. Flynn	8,361	25.21	+0.63
Social Credit	Howard A. Prentice	450	1.36	–
Total valid votes		33,166	98.88	
Total rejected ballots		374	1.12	–0.11
Turnout		33,540	71.26	–4.39
Eligible voters		47,066		
Progressive Conservative hold		Swing		–9.61
Source: Elections Ontario

1945 Ontario general election
Party	Candidate	Votes	%	±%
Progressive Conservative	Charles Daley	16,344	49.91	+8.45
Liberal	J. Verne Buchanan	8,051	24.58	–3.55
Co-operative Commonwealth	C. Peter MacLean	6,791	20.74	–9.68
Labour	Paul Siren	1,563	4.77	–
Total valid votes		32,749	98.78	
Total rejected ballots		405	1.22	+0.39
Turnout		33,154	75.65	+13.32
Eligible voters		43,826		
Progressive Conservative hold		Swing		+6.00
Source: Elections Ontario

1943 Ontario general election
Party	Candidate	Votes	%	±%
Progressive Conservative	Charles Daley	10,139	41.46	–2.52
Co-operative Commonwealth	Allen Eugene Schroeder	7,438	30.41	+22.79
Liberal	Archibald Judson Haines	6,880	28.13	–20.27
Total valid votes		24,457	99.16	
Total rejected ballots		206	0.84	–0.25
Turnout		24,663	62.33	–10.43
Eligible voters		39,566		
Progressive Conservative gain from Liberal		Swing		+8.88
Source: Elections Ontario

1937 Ontario general election
Party	Candidate	Votes	%	±%
Liberal	Archibald Judson Haines	12,547	48.40	–0.44
Conservative	William J. Chapman	11,401	43.98	+0.56
Co-operative Commonwealth	Allen Eugene Schroeder	1,975	7.62	–0.12
Total valid votes		25,923	98.91	
Total rejected ballots		285	1.09	–0.31
Turnout		26,208	72.76	–4.18
Eligible voters		36,018		
Liberal hold		Swing		–0.50
Source: Elections Ontario

1934 Ontario general election
Party	Candidate	Votes	%	±%
Liberal	Frederick Harold Avery	12,924	48.85	+13.58
Conservative	William J. Chapman	11,488	43.42	–0.00
Co-operative Commonwealth	George White Pay	2,047	7.74	–
Total valid votes		26,459	98.60	
Total rejected ballots		376	1.40	+0.60
Turnout		26,835	76.94	+5.85
Eligible voters		34,878		
Liberal gain from Conservative		Swing		+6.79
Source: Elections Ontario

1929 Ontario general election
Party	Candidate	Votes	%	±%
Conservative	Sidney Wilson	3,557	43.42	–0.21
Liberal	Arthur Damude	2,889	35.27	–
Progressive	Robert Kemp	1,746	21.31	–35.06
Total valid votes		8,192	99.20	
Total rejected ballots		66	0.80	+0.44
Turnout		8,258	71.09	+5.64
Eligible voters		11,616		
Conservative gain from Progressive		Swing		+17.43
Source: Elections Ontario

1926 Ontario general election
Party	Candidate	Votes	%	±%
Progressive	Robert Kemp	4,348	56.37	+21.33
Conservative	Roland W. Gregory	3,365	43.63	+13.08
Total valid votes		7,713	99.64	
Total rejected ballots		28	0.36	–1.76
Turnout		7,741	65.45	+6.25
Eligible voters		11,827		
Progressive hold		Swing		+17.20
Source: Elections Ontario

1923 Ontario general election
Party	Candidate	Votes	%	±%
United Farmers	Robert Kemp	2,360	35.05	+1.81
Liberal	Thomas Marshall	2,317	34.41	–4.98
Conservative	Thomas W. Allan	2,057	30.55	+3.17
Total valid votes		6,734	97.88	
Total rejected ballots		146	2.12	–2.08
Turnout		6,880	59.20	–18.14
Eligible voters		11,622		
United Farmers gain from Liberal		Swing		+3.40
Source: Elections Ontario

1919 Ontario general election
Party	Candidate	Votes	%	±%
Liberal	Thomas Marshall	3,242	39.39	–14.28
United Farmers	Wilson Kline	2,735	33.23	–
Conservative	Daniel H. Moyer	2,253	27.38	–18.95
Total valid votes		8,230	95.80	
Total rejected ballots		361	4.20	+3.86
Turnout		8,591	77.33	–11.87
Eligible voters		11,109		
Liberal hold		Swing		–7.14
Source: Elections Ontario

1914 Ontario general election
Party	Candidate	Votes	%	±%
Liberal	Thomas Marshall	2,051	53.68	–
Conservative	William J. Drope	1,770	46.32	–
Total valid votes		3,821	99.66	
Total rejected ballots		13	0.34	–
Turnout		3,834	89.20	–
Eligible voters		4,298		
Liberal gain from Conservative		Swing		–
Source: Elections Ontario

1911 Ontario general election
Party	Candidate	Votes
Conservative	Elisha Jessop	acclaimed
Source: Elections Ontario

1908 Ontario general election
Party	Candidate	Votes	%	±%
Conservative	Elisha Jessop	3,463	59.56	+2.98
Liberal	William Mitchell	2,351	40.44	–2.98
Total valid votes		5,814	98.89	
Total rejected ballots		65	1.11	+0.90
Turnout		5,879	78.67	–0.01
Eligible voters		7,473		
Conservative hold		Swing		+2.98
Source: Elections Ontario

1905 Ontario general election
Party	Candidate	Votes	%	±%
Conservative	Elisha Jessop	3,287	56.58	+2.24
Liberal	J. K. Black	2,522	43.42	+0.88
Total valid votes		5,809	99.79	
Total rejected ballots		12	0.21	–1.32
Turnout		5,821	78.68	–2.39
Eligible voters		7,398		
Conservative hold		Swing		+0.68
Source: Elections Ontario

1902 Ontario general election
Party	Candidate	Votes	%	±%
Conservative	Elisha Jessop	3,199	54.34	–45.66
Liberal	D. J. McKinnon	2,504	42.53	–
Prohibitionist	G. B. Nelson	184	3.13	–
Total valid votes		5,887	98.48	
Total rejected ballots		91	1.52	+0.30
Turnout		5,978	81.07	–2.07
Eligible voters		7,374		
Conservative hold		Swing		–22.83
Source: Elections Ontario

1898 Ontario general election
Party	Candidate	Votes	%	±%
Conservative	Elisha Jessop	2,974	53.15	+1.93
Conservative	James Doran	2,621	46.85	–4.38
Total valid votes		5,595	98.78	
Total rejected ballots		69	1.22	+0.44
Turnout		5,664	83.14	+6.52
Eligible voters		6,813		
Conservative hold		Swing		+3.15
Source: Elections Ontario

1894 Ontario general election
Party	Candidate	Votes	%	±%
Conservative	James Hiscott	2,548	51.23	–0.40
Unknown	Mr. Thompson	2,426	48.77	–
Total valid votes		4,974	99.22	
Total rejected ballots		39	0.78	+0.78
Turnout		5,013	76.62	+9.11
Eligible voters		6,543		
Conservative hold		Swing		–0.20
Source: Elections Ontario

1890 Ontario general election
Party	Candidate	Votes	%	±%
Conservative	James Hiscott	2,424	51.63	+1.80
Liberal	William Garson	2,271	48.37	–1.80
Total valid votes		4,695	100.00	
Total rejected ballots		–		
Turnout		4,695	67.51	+3.93
Eligible voters		6,955		
Conservative gain from Liberal		Swing		+1.80
Source: Elections Ontario

1886 Ontario general election
Party	Candidate	Votes	%	±%
Liberal	William Garson	2,242	50.17	–
Conservative	W. B. Towers	2,227	49.83	–
Total valid votes		4,469	99.11	
Total rejected ballots		40	0.89	–
Turnout		4,509	63.58	–
Eligible voters		7,092		
Liberal hold		Swing		–
Source: Elections Ontario

1883 Ontario general election
Party	Candidate	Votes
Liberal	Sylvester Neelon	acclaimed
Source: Elections Ontario

1879 Ontario general election
Party	Candidate	Votes	%	±%
Liberal	Sylvester Neelon	2,222	50.79	−0.59
Conservative	Mr. McCarthy	2,153	49.21	+0.59
Total valid votes		4,375	68.25	−7.00
Eligible voters		6,410		
Liberal hold		Swing		−0.59
Source: Elections Ontario

1875 Ontario general election
Party	Candidate	Votes	%
Liberal	Sylvester Neelon	2,065	51.38
Conservative	John Charles Rykert	1,954	48.62
Turnout		4,019	75.25
Eligible voters		5,341	
Liberal gain from Conservative			
Source: Elections Ontario

1871 Ontario general election
Party	Candidate	Votes
Conservative	John Charles Rykert	Acclaimed
Source: Elections Ontario

1867 Ontario general election
Party	Candidate	Votes
Conservative	John Charles Rykert	Acclaimed
Source: Elections Ontario

== See also ==
- List of Ontario provincial electoral districts
- Canadian provincial electoral districts
