= Edwin Cyrus Graves =

Canadian politician

MPP for St. Catharines
- In office June 25, 1923 – April 3, 1934

Personal details
- Born: March 18, 1868 St. Catharines, Ontario, Canada
- Died: August 10, 1936 (aged 68) near Buffalo, New York, U.S.
- Party: Progressive Conservative Party of Ontario

Edwin Cyrus Graves (March 18, 1868 – August 10, 1936) was an insurance broker, manufacturer and political figure in Ontario. He represented St. Catharines in the Legislative Assembly of Ontario from 1923 to 1934 as a Conservative member.

He was born in St. Catharines, the son of Oswin G Graves and Electra (Lettie) A Brown, and was educated there. In 1898, he married Agnes O'Connor. Graves served on the city council for St. Catharines in 1920 and 1921 and was mayor in 1922. He died in a car accident on August 10, 1936.
