= Archibald Judson Haines =

Canadian politician (1878-1950)

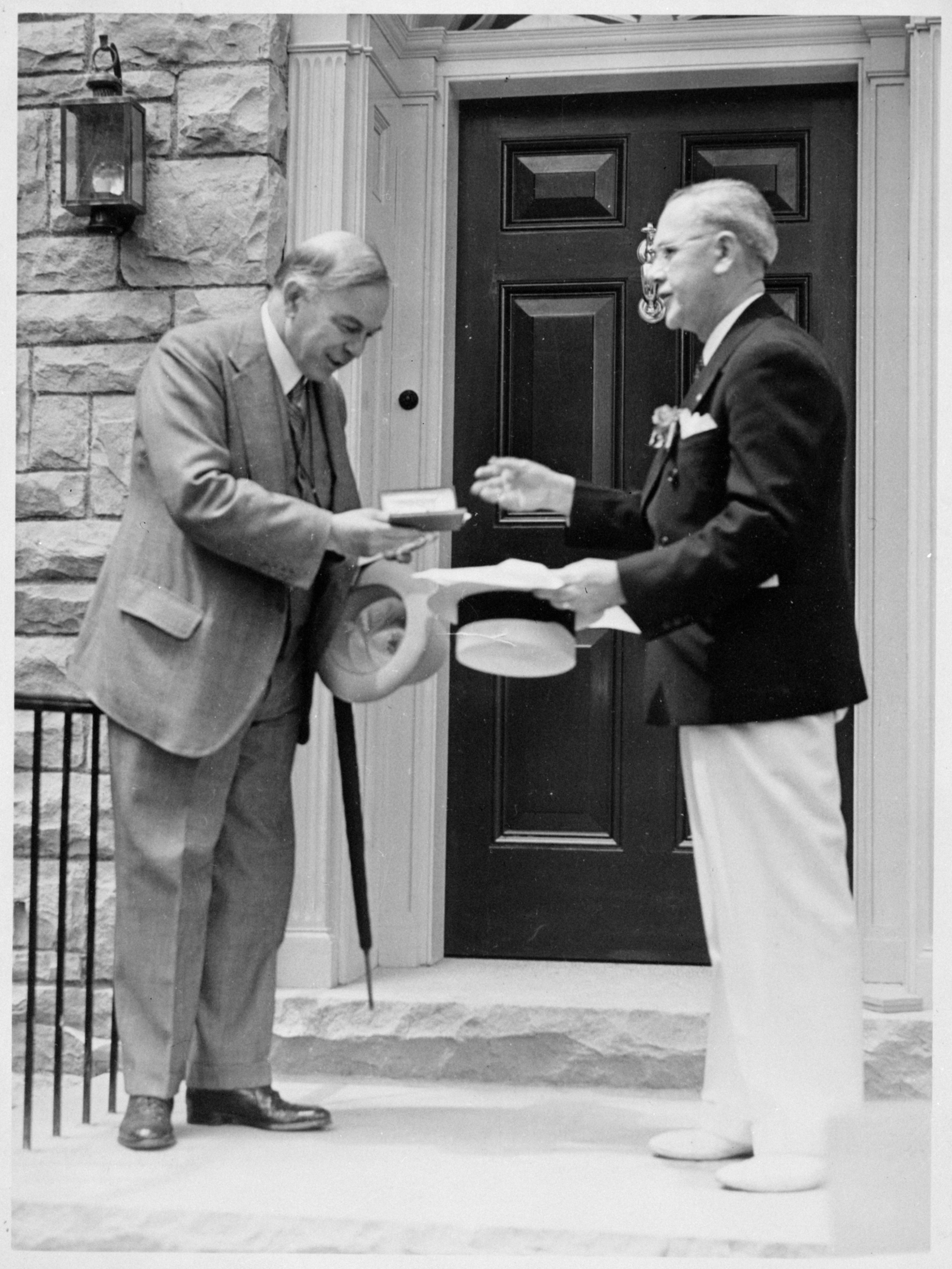
- Haines and Prime Minister King in 1938

Member of the Ontario Provincial Parliament for Lincoln
- In office October 6, 1937 – January 13, 1942
- Preceded by: Frederick Avery
- Succeeded by: Charles Daley

Personal details
- Born: October 13, 1878 Jordan, Ontario
- Died: September 24, 1950 (aged 71) Toronto, Ontario
- Party: Liberal

Archibald Judson Haines (October 13, 1878 – September 24, 1950) was a winery owner, fruit grower and politician in Ontario, Canada. He represented Lincoln in the Legislative Assembly of Ontario from 1937 to 1942 as a Liberal.

The son of Webster George Haines and Sarah Elizabeth Laws, he was born in Jordan and was educated there and in St. Catharines. Haines served on the Niagara Parks Commission and as chair of the Rainbow Bridge commission. In 1920, he was one of two founders of the Jordan Winery. Haines married Lucetta Overholt.

He resigned from the Ontario assembly in August 1941 to protest the granting of a license to sell beer and wine to a St. Catharines hotel adjoining the local arena. The Liquor Control Board of Ontario had given a written guarantee to the city that no license would be granted to that establishment.

Haines died in Wellesley Hospital at the age of 72 after an extended illness.
