= William Garson =

Canadian politician (1856–1911)

William C. W. Garson (May 6, 1856 – February 1, 1911) was a Scottish-born Ontario and Manitoba businessman and political figure. He represented Lincoln in the Legislative Assembly of Ontario as a Liberal member from 1886 to 1890.

== Early life ==
He was born in Kirkwall, Orkney Islands in 1856, the son of Robert Garson, and moved to St. Catharines, Canada West with his family in 1857. He served as a captain in the local militia. Garson was trained as a mason and became a construction contractor. In 1895, he married Margaret Annable.

== Career ==
Garson moved to Winnipeg in 1901 where he served on the Board of Control and helped establish the city's publicly owned hydroelectric system. He helped develop limestone quarries near Tyndall, the source of the Tyndall Stone later used in the construction of the provincial parliament buildings and the Canadian Museum of Civilization.

Garson continued to operate as a contractor until his death in Winnipeg due to pneumonia in 1911.

== Legacy ==
His son, Stuart, later served as premier of Manitoba. The village of Garson, Manitoba was named after William Garson.
