= Ron Hansen (politician) =

Canadian politician (1943–2022)

Ontario MPP
- In office 1990–1995
- Preceded by: Harry Pelissero
- Succeeded by: Frank Sheehan
- Constituency: Lincoln

Personal details
- Born: May 27, 1943 Welland, Ontario
- Died: March 9, 2022 (aged 78)
- Party: New Democrat
- Occupation: Stationary engineer

Ron Hansen (May 27, 1943 – March 9, 2022) was a Canadian politician in Ontario. He was a New Democratic Party member of the Legislative Assembly of Ontario from 1990 to 1995.

== Political career ==
In 1987 Hansen ran as the New Democratic Party candidate in the riding of Lincoln and finished third against Liberal Harry Pelissero in the provincial election of 1987.

The NDP won a majority government in the 1990 provincial election, and Hansen defeated Pelissero by 1,012 votes in a rematch from 1987. He served as a backbench supporter of the government of Bob Rae for the next five years. He was not awarded any posts such as parliamentary assistant or chair of a legislative committee because he refused to 'toe the party line' on government bills.

In 1994, Hansen was one of twelve NDP members to vote against Bill 167, a bill extending financial benefits to same-sex partners. Premier Bob Rae allowed a free vote on the bill which allowed members of his party to vote with their conscience.

The NDP were defeated in the 1995 provincial election, and Hansen finished third in his bid for re-election, behind Pelissero and the winner, Progressive Conservative Frank Sheehan.

== Personal life ==
Hansen worked as a stationary engineer before entering political life. He died on March 9, 2022, at the age of 78.
