= St. Catharines (federal electoral district) =

Federal electoral district in Ontario, Canada

Coordinates: 43.166°N 79.233°W

Ontario electoral district
- Interactive map of riding boundaries from the 2025 federal election

Federal electoral district
- Legislature: House of Commons
MP
Chris Bittle
Liberal
- District created: 1966
- First contested: 1968
- Last contested: 2025
- District webpage: profile, map

Demographics
- Population (2011): 110,596
- Electors (2015): 83,821
- Area (km²): 61
- Pop. density (per km²): 1,813
- Census division: Niagara
- Census subdivision: St. Catharines (part)

St. Catharines is a federal electoral district in the Niagara Region of Ontario, Canada, that has been represented in the House of Commons of Canada since 1968.

It consists of the part of the City of St. Catharines lying east and north of a line drawn from Lake Ontario: Courtleigh Road, Third Street Louth, the QEW, Highway 406, First Street Louth, St. Paul Street West, St. Paul Crescent, Twelve Mile Creek, Glendale Avenue, Merrit Street and Glendale Avenue.

== History ==
It was created in 1966 from parts of Lincoln riding.

It consisted initially of the part of the City of St. Catharines bounded on the east by the eastern city limit, and on the north, west and south by a line drawn from the city limit southwest along Eastchester Avenue, south along Bunting Road, southwest along Rockwood Street, south along Hartzell Road, northwest along the Canadian National Railway (CNR) line, south along Glengarry Road, east along Glendale Avenue, south along Mountain Street and east along Bradley Street to the city limit.

In 1976, it was redefined to consist of the part of the City of St. Catharines lying north of the Canadian National Railway.

In 1987, it was redefined to consist of the part of the City of St. Catharines lying north of a line drawn from west to east along St. Paul Street West, St. Paul Street West to St. Paul Crescent, the old Welland Canal, Carter Creek, the first Canadian National Railway spur line and the main CNR line and Queenston Street.

In 1996, it was redefined to consist of the part of the City of St. Catharines lying north and east of a line drawn from the western city limit along St. Paul Street West, St. Paul Crescent, the Old Welland Canal, Carter Creek, the first Canadian National Railway spur line, the most easterly Canadian National Railway spur line and the yard line to the southern city limit.

This riding lost fractions of territory to Niagara West and Niagara Centre during the 2012 electoral redistribution.

Following the 2022 Canadian federal electoral redistribution, the riding will gain the part of Niagara Centre in the City of St. Catharines that is east of Twelve Mile Creek, and will lose its territory in the Western Hill neighbourhood to Niagara West. These changes will come into effect following the call of the 2025 Canadian federal election.

== Demographics ==
According to the 2021 Canadian census

Ethnic groups: 80.7% White, 4.2% Black, 3.5% Indigenous, 2.4% Latin American, 2.2% South Asian, 1.4% Filipino, 1.3% Chinese, 1.2% Arab

Languages: 79.9% English, 2.1% Spanish, 1.8% French, 1.4% Italian, 1.3% German, 1.2% Arabic, 1.1% Polish

Religions: 58.3% Christian (25.7% Catholic, 6.1% Anglican, 4.2% United Church, 1.9% Presbyterian, 1.3% Anabaptist, 1.3% Christian Orthodox, 1.2% Baptist, 1.1% Lutheran, 1.1% Pentecostal, 14.4% Other), 3.1% Muslim, 36.2% None

Median income: $37,600 (2020)

Average income: $46,760 (2020)

== Federal riding associations ==
Riding associations are the local branches of the national political parties:

Party	Association name	CEO	HQ city
Conservative Party of Canada	St. Catharines Conservative Association	Michel Maisonneuve	St. Catharines
Liberal Party of Canada	St. Catharines Federal Liberal Association	Margaret Jarrell	St. Catharines
New Democratic Party	St. Catharines Federal NDP Riding Association	Caleb Ratzlaff	St. Catharines

== Members of Parliament ==
This riding has elected the following members of the House of Commons of Canada:

Parliament	Years	Member	Party
St. Catharines; Riding created from Lincoln
28th	1968–1972	James McNulty	Liberal
29th	1972–1974	J. Trevor Morgan	Progressive Conservative
30th	1974–1979	Gilbert Parent	Liberal
31st	1979–1980	Joseph Reid	Progressive Conservative
32nd	1980–1984	Joseph Reid	Progressive Conservative
33rd	1984–1988	Joseph Reid	Progressive Conservative
34th	1988–1993	Ken Atkinson	Progressive Conservative
35th	1993–1997	Walt Lastewka	Liberal
36th	1997–2000	Walt Lastewka	Liberal
37th	2000–2004	Walt Lastewka	Liberal
38th	2004–2006	Walt Lastewka	Liberal
39th	2006–2008	Rick Dykstra	Conservative
40th	2008–2011	Rick Dykstra	Conservative
41st	2011–2015	Rick Dykstra	Conservative
42nd	2015–2019	Chris Bittle	Liberal
43rd	2019–2021	Chris Bittle	Liberal
44th	2021–2025	Chris Bittle	Liberal
45th	2025–present	Chris Bittle	Liberal

== Election results ==
Graph of election results in St. Catherines (minor parties that never got 2% of the vote or didn't run consistently are omitted)

2025 Canadian federal election
** Preliminary results — Not yet official **
Party	Candidate	Votes	%	±%	Expenditures
Liberal	Chris Bittle	34,750	52.01	+14.14	
Conservative	Bas Sluijmers	27,011	40.43	+8.06	
New Democratic	Karen Orlandi	4,021	6.02	–15.29	
People's	Dennis Wilson	520	0.78	–5.81	
Independent	Christopher Reilly	308	0.46	N/A	
Centrist	Taha Alexander Haj-Ahmad	198	0.30	N/A	
Total valid votes/expense limit					
Total rejected ballots					
Turnout		66,808	68.95		
Eligible voters		96,896			
Liberal notional hold		Swing		+3.04	
Source: Elections Canada

2021 federal election redistributed results
Party	Vote	%
Liberal	23,125	37.87
Conservative	19,768	32.37
New Democratic	13,014	21.31
People's	4,024	6.59
Green	1,140	1.87

2021 Canadian federal election
Party	Candidate	Votes	%	±%	Expenditures
Liberal	Chris Bittle	22,069	37.59	-2.64	$63,959.39
Conservative	Krystina Waler	19,018	32.39	+0.82	$106,257.96
New Democratic	Trecia McLennon	12,294	20.94	+0.26	$13,666.86
People's	Rebecca Hahn	3,860	6.57	+5.20	$10,008.13
Green	Catharine Rhodes	1,091	1.86	-4.29	$205.19
Total valid votes/expense limit		58,332	99.36	-0.19	$118,995.79
Total rejected ballots		377	0.64	+0.19	
Turnout		58,709	64.51	-1.95	
Eligible voters		91,010			
Liberal hold		Swing		-1.70	
Source: Elections Canada

2019 Canadian federal election
Party	Candidate	Votes	%	±%	Expenditures
Liberal	Chris Bittle	24,183	40.23	-2.95	$87,246.25
Conservative	Krystina Waler	18,978	31.57	-6.00	$114,133.28
New Democratic	Dennis Van Meer	12,431	20.68	+4.16	none listed
Green	Travis Mason	3,695	6.15	+3.56	$5,554.85
People's	Allan deRoo	826	1.37		none listed
Total valid votes/expense limit		60,113	99.17		
Total rejected ballots		506	0.83	+0.41	
Turnout		60,619	66.46	-1.28	
Eligible voters		91,215			
Liberal hold		Swing		+1.52	
Source: Elections Canada

2015 Canadian federal election
Party	Candidate	Votes	%	±%	Expenditures
Liberal	Chris Bittle	24,870	43.18	+22.49	$100,562.32
Conservative	Rick Dykstra	21,637	37.57	-13.09	$188,880.75
New Democratic	Susan Erskine-Fournier	9,511	16.51	-7.44	$30,053.13
Green	Jim Fannon	1,488	2.58	-1.25	–
Communist	Saleh Waziruddin	85	0.15	-0.05	–
Total valid votes/Expense limit		57,591	99.58		$222,166.81
Total rejected ballots		243	0.42	–	
Turnout		57,834	67.74	–	
Eligible voters		85,377			
Liberal gain from Conservative		Swing		+17.79	
Source: Elections Canada

2011 federal election redistributed results
Party	Vote	%
Conservative	25,090	50.66
New Democratic	11,860	23.95
Liberal	10,248	20.69
Green	1,895	3.83
Others	436	0.88

2011 Canadian federal election
Party	Candidate	Votes	%	±%	Expenditures
Conservative	Rick Dykstra	25,571	50.9	+5.1	–
New Democratic	Mike Williams	11,973	23.8	+5.4	–
Liberal	Andrew Gill	10,358	20.6	-8.0	–
Green	Jennifer Mooradian	1,924	3.8	-3.0	$2,828.62
Christian Heritage	Dave Bylsma	357	0.7	+0.7	$8,069.31
Communist	Saleh Waziruddin	91	0.2	-0.0	–
Total valid votes/Expense limit		50,221	100.0	$89,890.78	
Rejected ballots		226	0.4	+0.1	
Turnout		50,500	60.9	-0.3	

2008 Canadian federal election
Party	Candidate	Votes	%	±%	Expenditures
Conservative	Rick Dykstra	23,474	45.9	+8.4	$77,155
Liberal	Walt Lastewka	14,652	28.6	-8.4	$85,551
New Democratic	George Addision	9,428	18.4	-2.1	$21,329
Green	Jim Fannon	3,477	6.8	+2.8	$3,511
Communist	Sam Hammond	113	0.2	–	$410
Total valid votes/Expense limit		51,144	100.0	$88,319	
Rejected ballots		161	0.3		
Turnout		51,305	61.2		

2006 Canadian federal election
Party	Candidate	Votes	%	±%	Expenditures
Conservative	Rick Dykstra	21,668	37.5	+2.8	$78,093.76
Liberal	Walt Lastewka	21,424	37.0	−3.4	$76,408.07
New Democratic	Jeff Burch	11,849	20.5	+1.2	$15,482.42
Green	Jim Fannon	2,306	4.0	+0.3	$991.15
Christian Heritage	Bill Bylsma	499	0.9	−0.5	$8,736.24
Marxist–Leninist	Elaine Couto	100	0.2	+0.1	
Total valid votes		57,846	100.0		
Sources: Official Results, Elections Canada and Financial Returns, Elections Canada.

2004 Canadian federal election
Party	Candidate	Votes	%	±%	Expenditures
Liberal	Walt Lastewka	21,277	40.4	−4.5	$67,606.54
Conservative	Leo Bonomi	18,261	34.7	−13.2	$76,063.45
New Democratic	Ted Mouradian	10,135	19.3	+13.1	$13,554.17
Green	Jim Fannon	1,927	3.7	–	$1,145.69
Christian Heritage	Linda Klassen	751	1.4	–	$15,303.13
Canadian Action	Jane Elizabeth Paxton	204	0.4	–	$0.00
Marxist–Leninist	Elaine Couto	61	0.1	−0.1	$6.90
Total valid votes		52,616	100.0		
Total rejected ballots		240			
Turnout		52,856	62.03		
Electors on the lists		85,209			
Percentage change figures are factored for redistribution. Conservative Party percentages are contrasted with the combined Canadian Alliance and Progressive Conservative percentages from 2000. Sources: Official Results, Elections Canada and Financial Returns, Elections Canada.

2000 Canadian federal election
Party	Candidate	Votes	%	±%	Expenditures
Liberal	Walt Lastewka	20,992	44.9	+1.5	$48,037.11
Alliance	Randy Taylor Dumont	15,871	34.0	+3.0	$65,538.72
Progressive Conservative	Ken Atkinson	6,522	14.0	+0.6	$20,495.69
New Democratic	John Bacher	2,878	6.2	−3.4	$12,153.96
Natural Law	Jim Morris	203	0.4	−0.1	$0.00
Independent	Tilly Bylsma	166	0.4	–	$4,942.92
Marxist–Leninist	Elaine Couto	93	0.2	–	$8.00
Total valid votes		46,725	100.0		
Total rejected ballots		223			
Turnout		46,948	60.02		
Electors on the lists		78,215			
Sources: Note: Canadian Alliance vote is compared to the Reform vote in 1997 election Official Results, Elections Canada and Financial Returns, Elections Canada.

1997 Canadian federal election
Party	Candidate	Votes	%	±%	Expenditures
Liberal	Walt Lastewka	21,081	43.5	−5.6	$46,896
Reform	Rob Hesp	15,029	31.0	+2.2	$41,350
Progressive Conservative	Gregg Crealock	6,503	13.4	−1.6	$25,799
New Democratic	Ed Gould	4,657	9.6	+3.8	$24,683
Christian Heritage	Tristan Emmanuel	688	1.4	+0.2	$7,249
Canadian Action	G.L. Malcolm	308	0.6	–	$2,976
Natural Law	Helene Darisse	245	0.5	–	$0.00
Total valid votes		48,511	100.0		
Total rejected ballots		272			
Turnout		48,783	65.49		
Electors on the lists		74,484			
Sources: Official Results, Elections Canada and Financial Returns, Elections Canada.

1993 Canadian federal election
Party	Candidate	Votes	%	Expenditures	
Liberal	Walt Lastewka	23,928	48.99		$49,786
Reform	Rob Hesp	14,011	28.69		$31,523
Progressive Conservative	Ken Atkinson	7,448	15.25		$40,187
New Democratic	Jane Hughes	2,799	5.73		$10,877
Christian Heritage	David W. Bylsma	568	1.16		$3,349
Abolitionist	Kevin Doucet	86	0.18		$0
Total valid votes		45,652	100.0		
Total rejected ballots		383			
Total valid votes		49,223	68.44		
Electors on the lists		71,919			
Source: Thirty-fifth General Election, 1993: Official Voting Results, Published by the Chief Electoral Officer of Canada. Financial figures taken from official contributions and expenses provided by Elections Canada.

1988 Canadian federal election
Party	Candidate	Votes	%	±%
Progressive Conservative	Ken Atkinson	19,623	40.7	-9.0
Liberal	Barbara Buchanan	16,043	33.3	+14.8
New Democratic	Rob West	12,260	25.5	-5.2
Communist	Eric Blair	241	0.5	+0.3
Total valid votes		48,167	100.0	

1984 Canadian federal election
Party	Candidate	Votes	%	±%
Progressive Conservative	Joe Reid	26,621	49.7	+11.8
New Democratic	Gerry Michaud	16,397	30.6	+4.2
Liberal	Linus Hand	9,890	18.5	-16.5
Green	Tom Ferguson	365	0.7	
Social Credit	Glen Hodgins	108	0.2	
Communist	Mel Doig	93	0.2	0.0
Commonwealth of Canada	Lancelot Mottley	56	0.1	
Total valid votes		53,530	100.0	

1980 Canadian federal election
Party	Candidate	Votes	%	±%
Progressive Conservative	Joe Reid	18,622	37.9	-8.4
Liberal	David Wiebe	17,173	34.9	+5.4
New Democratic	Peter Elliott	13,006	26.5	+3.0
Rhinoceros	Fred Horny Lake	230	0.2	-0.1
Communist	Don Stewart	76	0.5	
Marxist–Leninist	Vicki Wiwcharyk	35	0.1	0.0
Total valid votes		49,142	100.0	

1979 Canadian federal election
Party	Candidate	Votes	%	±%
Progressive Conservative	Joe Reid	23,444	46.3	+12.6
Liberal	William Andres	14,990	29.6	-16.7
New Democratic	Peter J. Elliott	11,897	23.5	+4.7
Libertarian	Kenneth F. MacKay	186	0.4	
Communist	Melbourne Doig	111	0.2	0.0
Marxist–Leninist	Victoria A. Wiwcharyk	40	0.1	-0.1
Total valid votes		50,668	100.0	

1974 Canadian federal election
Party	Candidate	Votes	%	±%
Liberal	Gilbert Parent	22,528	46.2	+8.0
Progressive Conservative	Trevor Morgan	16,402	33.7	-6.3
New Democratic	Fred Dickson	9,147	18.8	-1.3
Social Credit	Jean Charles Hamelin	443	0.9	-0.2
Communist	William Stewart	129	0.3	
Marxist–Leninist	Roger Ten Trey	69	0.1	
Total valid votes		48,718	100.0	

1972 Canadian federal election
Party	Candidate	Votes	%	±%
Progressive Conservative	Trevor Morgan	19,257	40.0	+3.5
Liberal	James C. McNulty	18,442	38.3	-7.2
New Democratic	Michael Inneq	9,683	20.1	+2.1
Social Credit	R.H. James	538	1.1	
Independent	John Donald Clout	250	0.5	
Total valid votes		48,170	100.0	

1968 Canadian federal election
Party	Candidate	Votes	%
Liberal	James C. McNulty	18,100	45.4
Progressive Conservative	Laura Sabia	14,544	36.5
New Democratic	June E. Cook	7,185	18.0
Total valid votes		39,829	100.0

== See also ==
- List of Canadian electoral districts
- Historical federal electoral districts of Canada
