= Frank Sheehan =

Canadian politician (1933–2013)

Ontario MPP
- In office 1995–1999
- Preceded by: Ron Hansen
- Succeeded by: Riding abolished
- Constituency: Lincoln

Personal details
- Born: 1933
- Died: December 17, 2013 (aged 79–80) St. Catharines, Ontario
- Party: Progressive Conservative
- Spouse: Diane
- Children: 7
- Occupation: Businessman

Francis Xavier Sheehan (1933 – December 17, 2013) was a Canadian politician. He was a Progressive Conservative member of the Legislative Assembly of Ontario from 1995 to 1999.

== Background ==
Sheehan graduated with a Bachelor of Commerce degree from the University of Windsor. He served as the president of Sheehan & Rosie, Insurance Brokers and was the chairman and co-founder of the Wayside House and Wayside Community Residential Centre. Sheehan was also a co-founder of the right-wing Taxpayers Coalition of Ontario. He was married for 54 years to Diane and father of 7 children.

== Politics ==
In 1970, he was elected as a trustee to the Lincoln County Separate School Board.

In the 1995 provincial election, Sheehan was elected in the southern Ontario riding of Lincoln defeating Liberal candidate Harry Pelissero and NDP incumbent Ron Hansen. For the next four years, he served as a backbench supporter of the Mike Harris government.

In 1996, the Harris government reduced the number of ridings from 130 to 103. This meant that some sitting MPPs had to compete against one another for re-election in the 1999 provincial election. Sheehan faced popular NDP maverick Peter Kormos in the riding Niagara Centre, and lost by over 4,000 votes.

Sheehan was known as an outspoken politician, on the right wing of his party. In 1997, he introduced a private member's bill that would have repealed the Rand formula. The bill was defeated by a vote of 20 to 15 with five PC members voting against it. Labour minister Elizabeth Witmer said, "Obviously people had to make the determination themselves, but I think people recognize there is balance in the province. They also recognize there is a great deal of stability at the present time." One of the principal commitments made by the Progressive Conservatives, during the 1995 election, was to deal with the issue of government "red tape", duplication and waste. The Harris government created the "Red Tape Commission" and Sheehan was made a co-chair of a unique organization that combined elected Members of Parliament with a group of experienced and committed civil servants. After the 1999 election, in recognition of his experience on the commission, Sheehan was appointed to continue serving as co-chair, from 1999 to 2003, along with MPP Steve Gilchrist.

== Later life ==
After leaving political office, he returned to the insurance business as a consultant. Sheehan died of cancer at his home in December 2013.
