= Harry Pelissero =

Canadian politician

Ontario MPP
- In office 1987–1990
- Preceded by: Philip Andrewes
- Succeeded by: Ron Hansen
- Constituency: Lincoln

Personal details
- Born: January 1, 1952 (age 74) St. Catharines, Ontario
- Party: Liberal
- Occupation: Farmer

Harry Pelissero (born January 1, 1952) is a former politician in Ontario, Canada. He sat in the Legislative Assembly of Ontario from 1987 to 1990, as a member of the Ontario Liberal Party.

== Background ==
Pelissero was educated at McMaster University in Hamilton, Ontario, and worked as a farmer and egg producer. He served as president of the Ontario Federation of Agriculture, and chaired a Federal-Provincial Crop Insurance Review Committee.

== Politics ==
He was elected to the Ontario legislature in the 1987 provincial election, defeating incumbent Progressive Conservative Philip Andrewes by 1,036 votes in the southwestern constituency of Lincoln. He sat as a government backbencher for the next three years, and served as a parliamentary assistant to the Minister of Tourism and Recreation from 1987 to 1988.

The Liberals were defeated by the Ontario New Democratic Party in the 1990 election, and Pelissero lost his seat to New Democrat Ron Hansen by 1,112 votes. He attempted a return to the legislature in the 1995 election, but lost to Progressive Conservative Frank Sheehan by almost 8,000 votes.

== Later life ==
In 1991, Pelissero was hired by the Independent Contractors Group of Ontario to represent "open shop" business concerns in the province. He contends that the group is not anti-union, but is meant to ensure a "level playing field" between unionized and non-unionized parties in contract negotiations. Pelissero is the general manager of the Egg Farmers of Ontario.
