= Elisha Jessop =

Canadian politician

Elisha Jessop (1843 – October 24, 1918) was a Canadian doctor and politician.

Born in Norfolk County, England, Jessop emigrated to Canada with his family in 1849. They settled in the small rural community of Reach, Canada West. He was educated in various rural schools before graduating from the Toronto Normal School in 1864. After working as a teacher in several smaller communities, Jessop entered the University of Toronto, graduating in 1870. He immediately enrolled in the university's medical school, and graduated as a medical doctor in 1875. Jessop set up a practice in the town of Jordan, Ontario. After a decade there, he returned to England for further studies, eventually returning to Canada and settling in St. Catharines in 1887. He then became known as a mortgagor to numerous St. Catharines residents.

Jessop and his wife had no offspring. However, in 1877 the Jessops fostered the children of Peter Tait (born Orkney Isl. 1838-1877), a mariner who came to Jordan Station earlier that year after his wife Elisabeth Mullay Manson (Orkney Isl.) had passed leaving them with his son and daughter, Charles Tait (1869-1951) and Jesse Tait (1867-?) to raise as a single father. Peter decided that he would do better by sailing the Great Lakes where he would have three weeks on and three weeks off allowing him to spend more time with his children. Unfortunately, in the autumn of 1877 Peter Tait drowned during a shipwreck off the coast of Tacoma, Washington. Jessop then took on the full guardianship of raising Peter Tait's children. Jessop assisted in the birth of Charles' daughters Mary Alena Tait Coyne (1895 -1985 who married Arthur J. Coyne, the pharmacist owner/operator of the historic Niagara Apothecary in Niagara on the Lake, Ontario 1914-1922) and her sister Minnette Tait Crawford (1902 - 1974 wife of Henry Ford's executive, John Crawford).

In 1898, at the age of 55, Jessop entered Ontario politics, successfully standing as the Conservative candidate for the riding of Lincoln. This began a twenty-year political career as a member of the Legislative Assembly of Ontario.

Jessop died of heart problems while still in office and is buried at Victoria Lawn Cemetery in St. Catharines. After his Last Will & Testament was probated, 26 mortgages were 100% discharged regardless of what was owed.
