= Kim Craitor =

Canadian politician

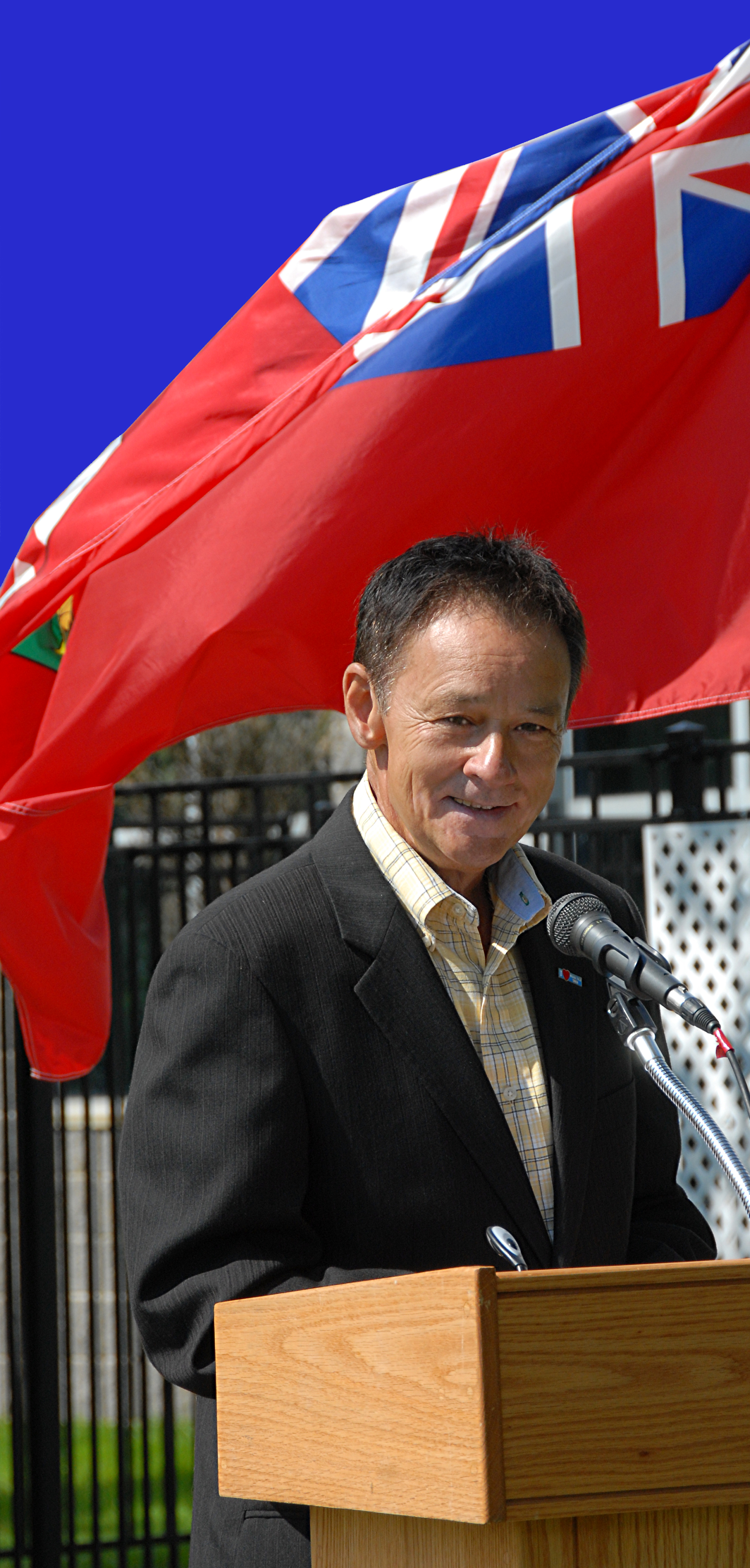

Member of the Ontario Provincial Parliament for Niagara Falls
- In office October 2, 2003 – September 24, 2013
- Preceded by: Bart Maves
- Succeeded by: Wayne Gates

Niagara Falls Alderman
- In office 1990–2003

Personal details
- Born: September 22, 1946 (age 80) Hamilton, Ontario, Canada
- Party: Liberal
- Spouse: Helen
- Profession: Human resource development

Kim Craitor (born September 22, 1946) is a politician in Ontario, Canada. He is a former member of the Legislative Assembly of Ontario, representing the constituency of Niagara Falls for the Ontario Liberal Party from 2003 to 2013.

== Background ==
Craitor grew up in the foster care system as a child before being adopted. This is evidenced in Hansard where on March 24, 2008, he is quoted as saying "One personal story-and I think I should share mine. You know, politics is a funny world. People sometimes think we do everything because it's politically what we do. I never knew my parents. I was raised through the children's aid society. Somehow, while I was going through that system, these two elderly people, for whatever reason, took me in, kept me and raised me."

Craitor worked in human resource development before entering politics. He was executive director of the Niagara Falls Employment Help Centre, and was a human relations officer and investigation and control officer at Human Resources Development Canada for 26 years.

== Alderman ==
Craitor was elected as an alderman to the Niagara Falls City Council in 1990, and served in that capacity until 2003, often quarrelling with Mayor Wayne Thomson. He also served for ten years on the Niagara Falls Chamber of Commerce.

== Provincial politics ==
Prior to the 2003 provincial election, Craitor defeated former party candidate Selena Volpatti for the Liberal nomination in Niagara Falls. He was successful in the general election, defeating Progressive Conservative incumbent Bart Maves by about 3,500 votes.

Craitor served as Government Whip from 2003 to 2007.

In March 2006, Craitor was named parliamentary assistant to the Minister of Community Safety and Correctional Service and has also served as parliamentary assistant to the Minister of Energy and Infrastructure. He was the parliamentary assistant to the Minister of Tourism and Culture (Tourism) from 2010 to February 2013 and then returned to his previous position as parliamentary assistant to the Minister of Community Safety and Correctional Services from February 2013 until his retirement from provincial politics.

As a member of the Ontario Legislative Assembly, Craitor has advocated for a transparent and open government policy for public bodies, the right of grandparents to have reasonable access to their grandchildren and right of the public to access to shoreline beaches along the Great Lakes coastline. As an MPP, Craitor earned a reputation as a maverick, sparring with his own government on issues such as hospital closures in his riding.

Craitor was re-elected in the 2007 provincial election and was elected to a third term as member for Niagara Falls in the 2011 Ontario provincial election, defeating Progressive Conservative candidate George Lepp by 551 votes.

On September 24, 2013, Craitor announced his resignation as MPP citing mental exhaustion and saying he wanted to focus on his health and family. During the subsequent by-election campaign, Craitor declined to endorse any of the candidates to succeed him, saying that Liberal Joyce Morocco, Progressive Conservative Bart Maves, New Democrat Wayne Gates and Green candidate Clarke Bitter are all his friends. "Wayne is a good friend of mine. He supported me in his own way [when Craitor first ran for MPP in 2003]. I never forgot that... Joyce is a real friend of mine. I get along with Bart and Clarke helped me [during past campaigns]... I'm going to keep my friends." In 2016 it was revealed that Craitor resigned from the provincial legislature after allegations of sexual harassment were made against him. Premier Kathleen Wynne asked him to resign after reviewing an independent, third-party report about the incident. After the circumstances of his resignation were reported on, Craitor said the allegations were "unfounded and unsubstantiated" and that was forced to resign by the Liberal party.

== Return to municipal politics ==
Craitor was elected to Niagara Falls City Council in the 2014 municipal election.

Craitor was approached by the New Democratic Party to run in the federal riding of Niagara Falls in the 2015 federal election, but opted to remain at city council.

== Electoral record ==
Niagara Falls mayoral election, 2018
| Mayoral Candidate | Vote | % |
| Jim Diodati (X) | 13,875 | 58.09 |
| Kim Craitor | 8,252 | 34.55 |
| Dinah Lilia Mourise | 1,047 | 4.38 |
| Kip Finn | 710 | 2.97 |
| Total | 23,884 | 100.00 |
Source: City of Niagara Falls

2011 Ontario general election
| Party | Candidate | Votes | % | ±% |
|---|---|---|---|---|
| Liberal | Kim Craitor | 16,721 | 35.95 | |
| Progressive Conservative | George Lepp | 16,170 | 34.76 | |
| New Democratic | Wayne Redekop | 12,233 | 26.30 | |
| Green | Byrne Smith | 754 | 1.62 | |
| Libertarian | Adam Hyde | 214 | 0.46 | |
| Family Coalition | John Jankovic | 191 | 0.41 | |
| Independent | Jeannette Tossounian | 120 | 0.26 | |
| Independent | Tim Tredwell | 111 | 0.24 | |

2007 Ontario general election
| Party | Candidate | Votes | % | ±% |
|---|---|---|---|---|
| Liberal | Kim Craitor | 22,178 | 47.51 | +0.64 |
| Progressive Conservative | Bart Maves | 14,573 | 31.22 | -6.86 |
| Green | Melanie Mullen | 5,337 | 11.43 | +8.61 |
| New Democratic | Mike Piché | 4,591 | 9.84 | -2.50 |
| Total valid votes | | 46,679 | 100.00 | |

2003 Ontario general election
| Party | Candidate | Votes | % | ±% |
|---|---|---|---|---|
| Liberal | Kim Craitor | 18,904 | 46.86 | +4.66 |
| Progressive Conservative | Bart Maves | 15,353 | 38.06 | -7.64 |
| New Democratic | Claude Sonier | 4,962 | 12.30 | +2.45 |
| Green | Ryan McLaughlin | 1,124 | 2.79 | +2.05 |
| Total valid votes | | 40,343 | 100.00 | |
