= 2026 Niagara Region municipal elections =

- October 26, 2026
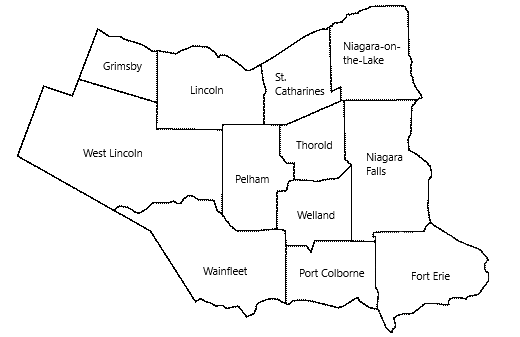
- Map of the Regional Municipality of Niagara, showing its component municipalities.

Elections will be held in the Niagara Region of Ontario on October 26, 2026, in conjunction with municipal elections across the province.

== Niagara Regional Council ==
Following the passage of the "Better Regional Governance Act", Niagara's council will be reduced to just the mayors of the 12 constituent municipalities, plus a chair, who will be appointed by the provincial government.

Position	Elected
Chair	Appointed by provincial government
Fort Erie Mayor	
Grimsby Mayor	
Lincoln Mayor	
Niagara Falls Mayor	
Niagara-on-the-Lake Lord Mayor	
Pelham Mayor	
Port Colborne Mayor	
St. Catharines Mayor	
Thorold Mayor	
Wainfleet Mayor	
Welland Mayor	
West Lincoln Mayor	Cheryl Ganann (acclaimed)

== Fort Erie ==
=== Mayor ===
Mayor Wayne Redekop is running for re-election. Also running is regional councillor Tom Insinna.

List of candidates:

Mayoral Candidate	Vote	%
Wayne H. Redekop (X)		
Mike Campbell		
Tom Insinna		
Juan Liu		

== Grimsby ==
=== Mayor ===
Mayor Jeff Jordan is running for re-election. Running against him is Ward 3 councillor Veronica Carrois, Downtown Grimsby Business Improvement Area chair, Grimsby Peach Kings owner and bar owner Simon Duong, and regional councillor Michelle Seaborn.

List of candidates:

Mayoral Candidate	Vote	%
Jeff Jordan (X)		
Veronica Charrois		
Simon Duong		
Michelle Seaborn		

== Lincoln ==
=== Mayor ===
Mayor Sandra Easton will not be seeking re-election. Running to replace her include Ward 4 councillor Greg Reimer, Ward 1 councillor Adam Russell and Village of Hope Niagara founder and CEO Cheryl Keddy-Scott.

List of candidates:

Mayoral Candidate	Vote	%
Greg Reimer		
Adam Thomas Russell		
Cheryl Keddy-Scott		

== Niagara Falls ==
List of candidates:

=== Mayor ===
Mayor Jim Diodati ran for re-election. He was challenged by barber Kevin Martineau, retired mechanic Gary Baker, and author, screenwriter, entrepreneur and military and police investigator Paul Manning, and city councillor Lori Lococo.

Mayoral Candidate	Vote	%
Lori Lococo	14,058	51.45
Jim Diodati (X)	11,401	41.73
Paul Manning	986	3.61
Kevin Martineau	510	1.87
Michael Lucid	366	1.34

=== Niagara Falls City Council ===
Eight to be elected at-large.

Candidate	Vote	%
Fred Audibert	14,449	9.57
Tony Baldinelli (X)	10,894	7.21
Kim Craitor	10,449	6.92
Ruth-Ann Nieuwesteeg (X)	10,162	6.73
Joyce Morocco	9,589	6.35
Mona Patel (X)	8,766	5.81
Chris Dabrowski (X)	8,425	5.58
Mike Strange (X)	8,324	5.51
Dan Moody	7,318	4.85
Sheila Deluca	6,343	4.20
Frank De Luca	5,037	3.34
Rich Merlino	4,919	3.26
Terry Thomson	4,397	2.91
Carmine Ioannoni	4,114	2.72
Chris Rigas	4,065	2.69
Winnie Winrow	3,378	2.24
Lilian Lum Mbah	3,342	2.21
Rob Barranca	3,271	2.17
Dan Giancola	3,007	1.99
Joedy Burdett	2,889	1.91
Tawnya Hartford	2,778	1.84
Carm Notarianni	2,402	1.59
Gary Baker	2,311	1.53
Darlene Cane	2,236	1.48
Celia Taylor	1,997	1.32
Shaner O'Connell	1,742	0.15
Brado Pine	1,450	0.96
Nohemi Renteria	1,153	0.76
Jitto Tom	1,034	0.68
Aaron Ramnarine	756	0.50

== Niagara-on-the-Lake ==
=== Lord Mayor ===
Lord Mayor Gary Zalepa has yet to announce whether or not he will be seeking re-election. Running so far include Deputy Lord Mayor Erin Wiens, regional councillor Andrea Kaiser and philanthropist Vaughn Goettler.

List of candidates:

Lord Mayoral Candidate	Vote	%
Vaughn Goettler		
Andrea Kaiser		
Erwin Wiens		

== Pelham ==
=== Mayor ===
Mayor Marvin Junkin is being challenged by the former chief of Niagara Emergency Medical Services, Frank Adamson in a re-match of the 2022 mayoral race. Also running are Wally Braun who ran for Regional Council in 2022 and Randy Gananathan, vice-chair of the Pelham Seniors Advisory Committee.

List of candidates:

Mayoral Candidate	Vote	%
Marvin Junkin (X)		
Frank Adamson		
Wally Braun		
Randy Gananathan		

== Port Colborne ==
=== Mayor ===
Mayor Bill Steele is running for re-election. He is being opposed by former city councillor Bea Kenney, and third time candidate Larry Rosnuk.

List of candidates:

Mayoral Candidate	Vote	%
Bill Steele (X)		
Bea Kenney		
Larry Rosnuk		
Michael Bunton		
Cameron Klemm		

== St. Catharines ==
List of candidates:

2026 St. Catharines municipal election
- October 26, 2026
- Turnout: 27.87% (▲1.56 pp)
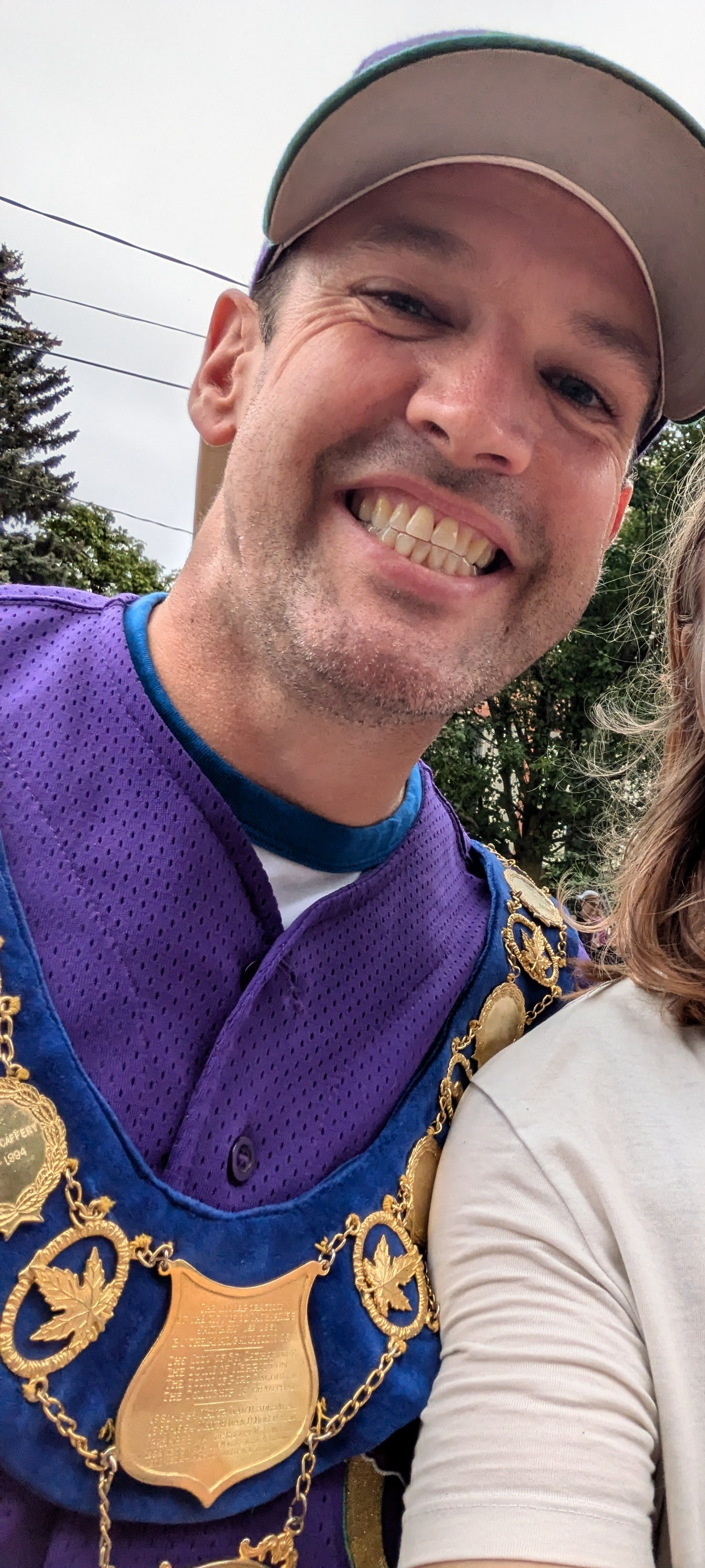
Candidate	Mat Siscoe	Ann-Marie Zammit
Popular vote	16,763	9,740
Percentage	52.42%	30.46%
Candidate	Jimmy Jackson	Anthony A. Adeoye
Popular vote	2,395	1,910
Percentage	7.49%	5.97%
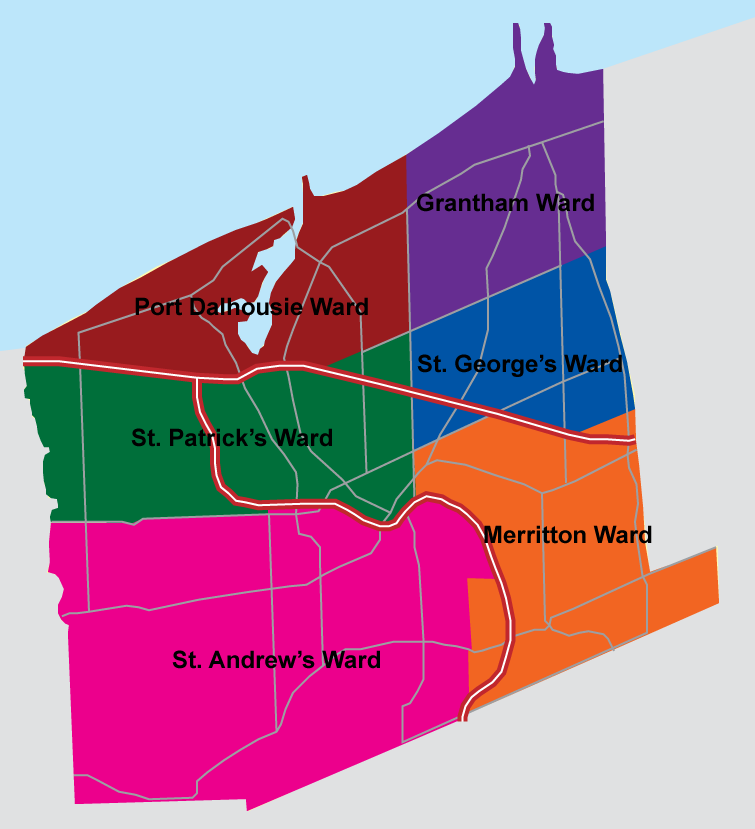
- The Ward boundaries for the 2022 Election. The Mayor and regional councillors are elected across the city, Councillors in their respective wards.
Mayor before election
Mat Siscoe
Elected mayor
Mat Siscoe

=== Mayor ===
Mayor Mat Siscoe is running for re-election. He is being challenged by the director of operations at VEC Ventures Anthony Adeoye and president of the Kiwanis Club of St. Catharines Ann-Marie Zammit.

Mayoral Candidate	Vote	%
Mat Siscoe (X)	16,763	52.42
Ann-Marie Zammit	9,740	30.46
Jimmy Jackson	2,395	7.49
Anthony A. Adeoye	1,910	5.97
Henry Bosch	1,169	3.66

=== St. Catharines City Council ===
Two to be elected in each ward.

==== Ward 1 - Merriton ====
Candidate	Vote	%
Jackie Lindal (X)	2,932	40.51
Matt Aymar	2,156	29.79
Geoff Crane	1,450	20.04
Ashlee Davidson-Miller	699	9.66

==== Ward 2 - St. Andrew's ====
Candidate	Vote	%
Matt Harris (X)	2,112	23.40
Bryan Blue	1,510	16.73
Noel Buckley	1,479	16.38
Catherine McNabb	1,336	14.80
Adriana Clifford	1,116	12.36
Tom Neale	1,058	11.72
Jim Adair	416	4.61

==== Ward 3 - St. George's ====
Candidate	Vote	%
Mike Britton	2,226	30.42
Sal Sorrento	1,749	23.90
Kate Werneburg	1,078	14.73
Kevin Townsend (X)	1,039	14.20
Mark Stevens (X)	874	11.94
Alexander Miller	352	4.81

==== Ward 4 - St. Patrick's ====
Candidate	Vote	%
Caleb Ratzlaff (X)	2,751	30.04
Robin McPherson (X)	2,327	25.41
Noah Machek	2,229	24.34
Allen McKay	1,001	10.93
Grant Higginson	849	9.27

==== Ward 5 - Grantham ====
Candidate	Vote	%
Dawn Dodge (X)	3,217	31.59
Bill Phillips (X)	2,954	29.01
Spencer Bellows-DeWolfe	2,761	27.12
Dunsin Sunday Fakorede	959	9.42
Emmanuel Oneka	291	2.86

==== Ward 6 - Port Dalhousie ====
Candidate	Vote	%
Marty Mako (X)	4,514	48.09
Bruce Williamson (X)	3,619	38.55
Constantina O'Reilly	1,254	13.36

== Thorold ==
=== Mayor ===
Mayor Terry Ugulini will not be running for re-election. Running to replace him is former mayor and incumbent city councillor Henry D'Angela, and regional councillor Tim Whalen.

List of candidates:

Mayoral Candidate	Vote	%
Henry D'Angela		
Tim Whalen		

== Wainfleet ==
Mayor Brian Grant was challenged by former mayor Kevin Gibson.

List of candidates:

=== Mayor ===
Mayoral Candidate	Vote	%
Brian Grant (X)	1818	62%
Kevin Gibson	1111	38%

=== Council ===
Candidate	Vote	%
Joe Gonzalez	1606	
Paul Wainright	1325	
Scott William Wilson	993	
Jeannette Pieterse	951	
Terry Gilmore (X)	949	
Rebecca Anderson	921	
Sherri Van Vliet (X)	902	
Dan Bath	874	
Lee Bott	802	
John MacLellan (X)	701	

== Welland ==
List of candidates:

=== Mayor ===
Mayor Frank Campion did not run for re-election. Running for mayor were Ward 5 city councillor Graham Speck, Natashia Bergen, Green Party candidate in the 2025 Canadian federal election, regional councillor Pat Chiocchio, former Wainfleet mayor April Jeffs, and Ward 2 city councillor David McLeod.

Mayoral Candidate	Vote	%
Pat Chiocchio	4,271	26.65
Graham Speck	4,216	26.31
April Jeffs	3,091	19.29
David McLeod	2,009	12.54
Gary Graziani	717	4.47
Brandon Simon	591	3.69
David Clow	582	3.63
Natashia Bergen	548	3.42

=== Welland City Council ===
Map of Welland's wards, first used in this election

Two to be elected in each ward.

Welland's wards were re-drawn for the 2026 election.

==== Ward 1 ====
Candidate	Vote	%
Adam Moote (X)	1,672	35.36
Jessica LaHay	1,285	27.17
Brad Ulch	748	15.82
Josh Sawatsky	549	11.61
Kiron Bondale	475	10.04

==== Ward 2 ====
Candidate	Vote	%
Nick Albano	1,180	24.09
Aldo Parrotta	963	19.66
Leo Van Vliet (X)	866	17.68
Steve Yochim	858	17.52
Carolyn Fast	825	16.84
Vince DiMauro	206	4.21

==== Ward 3 ====
Candidate	Vote	%
John Chiocchio (X)	1,802	36.69
Sharmila Setaram (X)	1,295	26.37
James Takeo	687	13.99
Steve Soos	659	13.42
John Braimoh	468	9.53

==== Ward 4 ====
Candidate	Vote	%
Bryan Green (X)	976	26.38
David Alexander	890	24.05
Terry Zorgel	795	21.49
Tony DiMarco (X)	530	14.32
Tia DeAgazio	344	9.30
Tissa Ratnayake	103	2.78
Safdar Ali	62	1.68

==== Ward 5 ====
Candidate	Vote	%
Claudette Richard (X)	1,217	27.07
Aaron Albano	906	20.15
Connie McCutcheon	855	19.02
Mark Dzugan	746	16.59
Luca Mele	574	12.77
Michelle Febers	198	4.40

==== Ward 6 ====
Candidate	Vote	%
Bonnie Fokkens (X)	993	27.67
Jim Larouche	935	26.05
Jamie Lee (X)	736	20.51
Steve Falusi	361	10.06
Cheryl Rowe	316	8.80
Kevin Muller	128	3.57
Sean Vout	120	3.34

== West Lincoln ==
=== Mayor ===
Mayor Cheryl Ganann was re-elected by acclamation.

Mayoral Candidate	Vote	%
Cheryl Ganann (X)	Acclaimed	
