= List of mayors of Niagara Falls, Ontario =

This is an incomplete list of mayors of the City of Niagara Falls, Ontario.

== Town of (Clifton 1856–1880) Niagara Falls 1856–1904 ==
- Gilbert McMicken (1856–1857)
- Frederic William Hill (1898)

== City of Niagara Falls 1904–present ==
- 1. George Hanan (1904)
- 2. W. H. Phemister (1905)
- 3. R. P. Slater (1906–1907)
- 4. Richard F. Carter (1908)
- 3. R. P. Slater + (1909)
- 5. O. E. Dores (1910–1911)
- 6. Charles C. Cole (1912–1913)
- 5. O. E. Dores + (1914)
- 7. C. N. Glendening (1915–1917)
- 8. Harry P. Stephens (1918–1921)
- 9. Charles R. Newman (1922–1924)
- 10. Harry P. Stephens (1925–1928)
- 11. Charles Swayze (1929–1934)
- 12. Charles W. Anderson (1935–1937)
- 13. Carl Hanniwell (1938–1939)
- 14. George R. Inglis (1940–1946)
- 15. William Houck (1947–1950)
- 16. Ernest Hawkins (1951–1958)
- 17. Franklin Miller (1959–1964)
- 18. Robert F. Keighan (1965–1966)
- 17. Franklin Miller +(1967–1972)
- 19. George Bukator (1973–1978)
- 20. Wayne Thomson (1978–1983)
- 21. Bill Smeaton (1983–1991)
- 20. Wayne Thomson +(1991–2003)
- 22. Ted Salci (2003–2010)
- 23. Jim Diodati (2010–2026)
- 24. Lori Lococo (2026–present)

Note

- + Second time as mayor
