= Niagara Falls (provincial electoral district) =

Provincial electoral district in Ontario, Canada

Coordinates: 43.06°N 79.1281°W

Ontario electoral district
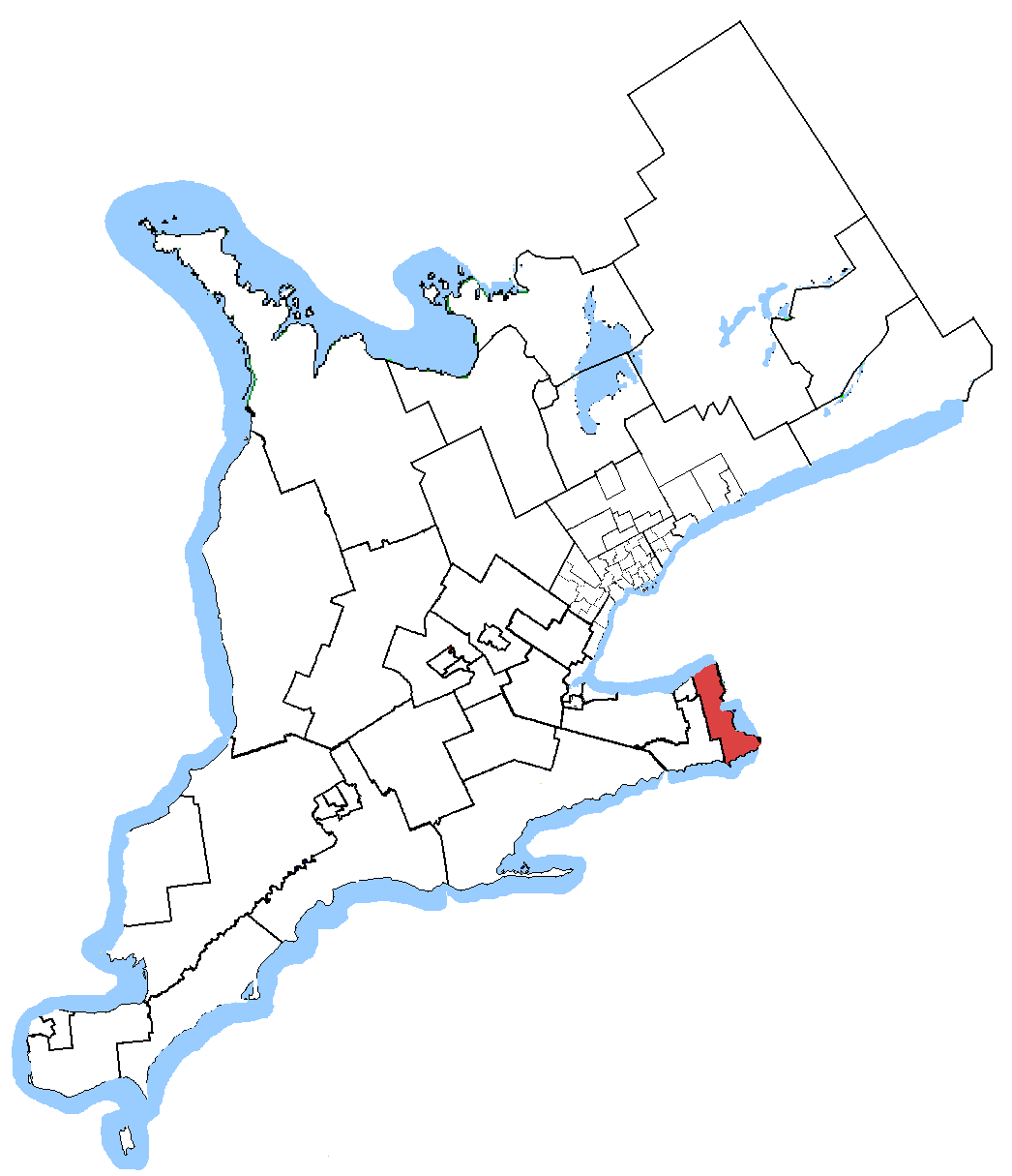
- Niagara Falls in relation to southern Ontario ridings

Provincial electoral district
- Legislature: Legislative Assembly of Ontario
MPP
Wayne Gates
New Democratic
- District created: 1914
- First contested: 1914
- Last contested: 2025

Demographics
- Population (2016): 136,290
- Electors (2018): 110,035
- Area (km²): 680
- Pop. density (per km²): 200.4
- Census division: Niagara
- Census subdivision(s): Niagara Falls, Fort Erie, Niagara-on-the-Lake

Niagara Falls is a provincial electoral district in Ontario, Canada. It was created prior to the 1914 provincial election, and has existed continuously since then.

Its boundaries were significantly redrawn in 1999, when Ontario adjusted all of its provincial electoral divisions to match those at the federal level.

== List of representatives ==
Niagara Falls
Assembly	Years	Member	Party
Riding created
14th	1914–1919	George Musgrove	Conservative
15th	1919–1923	Charles Swayze	Labour
16th	1923–1926	William Gore Willson	Conservative
17th	1926–1929	William Gore Willson	Conservative
18th	1929–1934	William Gore Willson	Conservative
19th	1934–1937	William Houck	Liberal
20th	1937–1943	William Houck	Liberal
21st	1943–1945	Cyril Overall	Co-operative Commonwealth
22nd	1945–1948	Carl Hanniwell	Progressive Conservative
23rd	1948–1951	William Houck	Liberal
24th	1951–1953	William Houck	Liberal
24th	1951–1953	Arthur Jolley	Progressive Conservative
25th	1955–1959	Arthur Jolley	Progressive Conservative
26th	1959–1963	George Bukator	Liberal
27th	1963–1967	George Bukator	Liberal
28th	1967–1971	George Bukator	Liberal
29th	1971–1975	John Clement	Progressive Conservative
30th	1975–1977	Vince Kerrio	Liberal
31st	1977–1981	Vince Kerrio	Liberal
32nd	1981–1985	Vince Kerrio	Liberal
33rd	1985–1987	Vince Kerrio	Liberal
34th	1987–1990	Vince Kerrio	Liberal
35th	1990–1995	Margaret Harrington	New Democratic
36th	1995–1999	Bart Maves	Progressive Conservative
37th	1999–2003	Bart Maves	Progressive Conservative
38th	2003–2007	Kim Craitor	Liberal
39th	2007–2011	Kim Craitor	Liberal
40th	2011–2013	Kim Craitor	Liberal
40th	2014–2014	Wayne Gates	New Democratic
41st	2014–2018	Wayne Gates	New Democratic
42nd	2018–2022	Wayne Gates	New Democratic
43rd	2022–2025	Wayne Gates	New Democratic
44th	2025–present	Wayne Gates	New Democratic

== Election results ==
Winning party in each polling division of Niagara Falls at the 2025 Ontario general election

2025 Ontario general election
Party	Candidate	Votes	%	±%	Expenditures
New Democratic	Wayne Gates	29,549	54.95	+6.87	$134,315
Progressive Conservative	Ruth-Ann Nieuwesteeg	18,569	34.53	–1.90	$143,643
Liberal	Shafoli Kapur	3,398	6.32	–2.10	$25,619
New Blue	Gary Dumelie	870	1.62	–1.18	$1,512
Green	Celia Taylor	837	1.56	–1.14	$0
Ontario Party	Andrew Soifert	285	0.53	–0.77	$0
Independent	Joedy Burdett	263	0.49	–	$0
Total valid votes/expense limit		53,771	99.18	–	$193,910
Total rejected, unmarked and declined ballots		444	0.82	+0.21	
Turnout		54,215	45.01	+1.41	
Eligible voters		120,441			
New Democratic hold		Swing		+4.39	
Source: Elections Ontario

Winning party in each polling division of Niagara Falls at the 2022 Ontario general election

2022 Ontario general election
Party	Candidate	Votes	%	±%	Expenditures
New Democratic	Wayne Gates	24,207	48.08	–2.71	$139,224
Progressive Conservative	Bob Gale	18,342	36.43	+0.86	$75,328
Liberal	Ashley Waters	4,239	8.42	–0.93	$13,483
New Blue	Christine Lewis-Napolitano	1,409	2.80	–	$3,184
Green	Tommy Ward	1,356	2.69	–0.77	$401
Ontario Party	Wesley Kavanagh	656	1.30	–	none listed
None of the Above	Devon St. Denis-Richard	135	0.27	–	$0
Total valid votes/expense limit		50,344	99.39		
Total rejected, unmarked and declined ballots		309	0.61	–0.47	
Turnout		50,653	43.60	–10.96	
Eligible voters		116,171			
New Democratic hold		Swing		–1.78	
Source: Elections Ontario

2018 Ontario general election
Party	Candidate	Votes	%	±%	Expenditures
New Democratic	Wayne Gates	30,161	50.79	+3.41	$106,759
Progressive Conservative	Chuck McShane	21,126	35.58	+2.78	$53,890
Liberal	Dean Demizio	5,554	9.35	–5.04	$20,779
Green	Karen Fraser	2,057	3.46	+0.08	$10
Libertarian	Shaun Somers	314	0.53	–0.57	none listed
Moderate	Goran Zubic	169	0.28	–	none listed
Total valid votes/expense limit		59,381	98.92		
Total rejected, unmarked and declined ballots		651	1.08	–0.16	
Turnout		60,032	54.56	+3.35	
Eligible voters		110,035			
New Democratic hold		Swing		+0.31	
Source: Elections Ontario

2014 Ontario general election
Party	Candidate	Votes	%	±%
New Democratic	Wayne Gates	24,131	47.39	+7.85
Progressive Conservative	Bart Maves	16,702	32.80	–3.96
Liberal	Lionel Tupman	7,329	14.39	–4.97
Green	Clarke Bitter	1,724	3.39	+0.65
Libertarian	Ralph Panucci	559	1.10	+0.67
None of the Above	John Ringo Beam	478	0.94	–
Total valid votes		50,923	98.76	
Total rejected, unmarked and declined ballots		640	1.24	+0.37
Turnout		51,563	51.21	+13.61
Eligible voters		100,698		
New Democratic hold		Swing		+5.91
Source: Elections Ontario

Ontario provincial by-election, February 13, 2014 Resignation of Kim Craitor
Party	Candidate	Votes	%	±%
New Democratic	Wayne Gates	14,589	39.54	+13.24
Progressive Conservative	Bart Maves	13,564	36.76	+1.93
Liberal	Joyce Morocco	7,144	19.36	–16.53
Green	Clarke Bitter	1,011	2.74	+1.12
Independent	Tim Tredwell	226	0.61	+0.37
Libertarian	Stefanos Karatopis	159	0.43	–0.03
People's Political Party	Troy Young	107	0.29	–
Freedom	Andrew Brannan	101	0.27	–
Total valid votes		36,901	99.13	
Total rejected, unmarked and declined ballots		324	0.87	+0.22
Turnout		37,225	37.59	–11.85
Eligible voters		99,024		
New Democratic gain from Liberal		Swing		+14.89
Source: Elections Ontario

2011 Ontario general election
Party	Candidate	Votes	%	±%
Liberal	Kim Craitor	16,794	35.89	–11.64
Progressive Conservative	George Lepp	16,296	34.83	+3.71
New Democratic	Wayne Redekop	12,304	26.30	+16.44
Green	Byrne Smith	759	1.62	–9.88
Libertarian	Adam Hyde	217	0.46	–
Family Coalition	John Jankovic	191	0.41	–
Independent	Jeannette Tossounian	119	0.25	–
No Affiliation	Tim Tredwell	112	0.24	–
Total valid votes		46,792	99.35	
Total rejected, unmarked and declined ballots		308	0.65	–0.15
Turnout		47,100	49.44	–1.64
Eligible voters		95,266		
Liberal hold		Swing		–7.67
Source: Elections Ontario

2007 Ontario general election
Party	Candidate	Votes	%	±%
Liberal	Kim Craitor	22,210	47.53	+0.67
Progressive Conservative	Bart Maves	14,540	31.12	–6.94
Green	Melanie Mullen	5,373	11.50	+8.71
New Democratic	Mike Piche	4,605	9.85	–2.44
Total valid votes		46,728	99.19	
Total rejected, unmarked and declined ballots		381	0.81	–0.08
Turnout		47,109	51.08	–6.32
Eligible voters		92,225		
Liberal hold		Swing		+3.81
Source: Elections Ontario

2003 Ontario general election
Party	Candidate	Votes	%	±%
Liberal	Kim Craitor	18,904	46.86	+4.66
Progressive Conservative	Bart Maves	15,353	38.06	–7.64
New Democratic	Claude Sonier	4,962	12.30	+2.45
Green	Ryan McLaughlin	1,124	2.79	+2.04
Total valid votes		40,343	99.11	
Total rejected, unmarked and declined ballots		363	0.89	+0.07
Turnout		40,706	57.40	–1.98
Eligible voters		70,915		
Liberal gain from Progressive Conservative		Swing		+6.15
Source: Elections Ontario

1999 Ontario general election
Party	Candidate	Votes	%	±%	Expenditures
Progressive Conservative	Bart Maves	18,497	45.70	+2.37	$57,730.70
Liberal	Selina Volpatti	17,080	42.20	+12.59	$49,687.00
New Democratic	Claude Sonier	3,985	9.85	–15.28	$14,873.79
Natural Law	Bill Amos	317	0.78	–0.48	$0
Green	Clara Tarnoy	300	0.74	–	not listed
Independent	Darren Wood	298	0.74	–	$330.00
Total valid votes		40,477	99.18		
Total rejected, unmarked and declined ballots		335	0.82	–0.55	
Turnout		40,812	59.38	–0.09	
Eligible voters		68,725			
Progressive Conservative hold		Swing		–5.11	
Source: Elections Ontario

1995 Ontario general election
Party	Candidate	Votes	%	±%	Expenditures
Progressive Conservative	Bart Maves	12,132	43.33	+30.32	$37,908.69
Liberal	Marg Germano	8,289	29.60	+2.95	$40,823.66
New Democratic	Margaret Harrington	7,034	25.12	–21.25	$15,733.37
Natural Law	Bill Amos	355	1.27	–	$0
Independent	Melania Gural	189	0.68	–	not listed
Total valid votes		27,999	98.63		
Total rejected, unmarked and declined ballots		388	1.37	+0.07	
Turnout		28,387	59.48	–3.90	
Eligible voters		47,729			
Progressive Conservative gain from New Democratic		Swing		+25.79	
Source: Elections Ontario

1990 Ontario general election
Party	Candidate	Votes	%	±%
New Democratic	Margaret Harrington	13,884	46.37	+16.54
Liberal	Wayne Campbell	7,979	26.65	–24.47
Progressive Conservative	Norm Puttick	3,896	13.01	–6.03
Confederation of Regions	Ted Wiwchar	3,141	10.49	–
Family Coalition	Art Klassen	674	2.25	–
Green	Donald MacDonald-Ross	365	1.22	–
Total valid votes		29,939	98.70	
Total rejected, unmarked and declined ballots		393	1.30	+0.49
Turnout		30,332	63.38	+5.52
Eligible voters		47,860		
New Democratic gain from Liberal		Swing		+20.51
Source: Elections Ontario

1987 Ontario general election
Party	Candidate	Votes	%	±%
Liberal	Vince Kerrio	13,600	51.12	+2.35
New Democratic	Margaret Harrington	7,936	29.83	+7.28
Progressive Conservative	Ed Sherar	5,066	19.04	–9.63
Total valid votes		26,602	99.19	
Total rejected ballots		216	0.81	–0.17
Turnout		26,818	57.86	–3.03
Eligible voters		46,351		
Liberal hold		Swing		–2.46
Source: Elections Ontario

1985 Ontario general election
Party	Candidate	Votes	%	±%
Liberal	Vince Kerrio	14,658	48.78	+1.54
Progressive Conservative	Ted Salci	8,616	28.67	–6.46
New Democratic	Deloris Skilton	6,778	22.55	+4.92
Total valid votes		30,052	99.03	
Total rejected ballots		295	0.97	+0.32
Turnout		30,347	60.89	+4.67
Eligible voters		49,839		
Liberal hold		Swing		+4.00
Source: Elections Ontario

1981 Ontario general election
Party	Candidate	Votes	%	±%
Liberal	Vince Kerrio	12,495	47.23	+3.81
Progressive Conservative	Ted Salci	9,295	35.14	+4.56
New Democratic	Dick Harrington	4,665	17.63	–8.37
Total valid votes		26,455	99.35	
Total rejected ballots		174	0.65	+0.19
Turnout		26,629	56.22	–11.74
Eligible voters		47,362		
Liberal hold		Swing		–0.37
Source: Elections Ontario

1977 Ontario general election
Party	Candidate	Votes	%	±%
Liberal	Vince Kerrio	13,280	43.42	+5.62
Progressive Conservative	Guy Ungaro	9,352	30.58	–6.60
New Democratic	Peter Sobol	7,952	26.00	+0.98
Total valid votes		30,584	99.54	
Total rejected ballots		142	0.46	–0.17
Turnout		30,726	67.97	+3.05
Eligible voters		45,208		
Liberal hold		Swing		+6.11
Source: Elections Ontario

1975 Ontario general election
Party	Candidate	Votes	%	±%
Liberal	Vince Kerrio	10,594	37.80	+1.89
Progressive Conservative	John Clement	10,422	37.18	–5.06
New Democratic	Peter Sobol	7,013	25.02	+3.18
Total valid votes		28,029	99.37	
Total rejected ballots		179	0.63	–0.17
Turnout		28,208	64.91	–8.54
Eligible voters		43,455		
Liberal gain from Progressive Conservative		Swing		+3.48
Source: Elections Ontario

1971 Ontario general election
Party	Candidate	Votes	%	±%
Progressive Conservative	John Clement	12,221	42.25	+9.51
Liberal	George Bukator	10,388	35.91	–15.25
New Democratic	Shirley G. Carr	6,319	21.84	+5.74
Total valid votes		28,928	99.20	
Total rejected ballots		234	0.80	–0.30
Turnout		29,162	73.46	+13.17
Eligible voters		39,699		
Progressive Conservative gain from Liberal		Swing		+12.38
Source: Elections Ontario

1967 Ontario general election
Party	Candidate	Votes	%	±%
Liberal	George Bukator	10,451	51.16	–1.65
Progressive Conservative	Philip Downie	6,688	32.74	–4.68
New Democratic	Roy Wiley	3,291	16.11	+6.33
Total valid votes		20,430	98.90	
Total rejected ballots		227	1.10	+0.11
Turnout		20,657	60.29	–2.10
Eligible voters		34,262		
Liberal hold		Swing		+3.16
Source: Elections Ontario

1963 Ontario general election
Party	Candidate	Votes	%	±%
Liberal	George Bukator	13,864	52.80	+0.73
Progressive Conservative	Franklin J. Miller	9,824	37.42	+3.58
New Democratic	Karl Clemens	2,568	9.78	–4.31
Total valid votes		26,256	99.01	
Total rejected ballots		263	0.99	–0.17
Turnout		26,519	62.39	+3.17
Eligible voters		42,503		
Liberal hold		Swing		+2.16
Source: Elections Ontario

1959 Ontario general election
Party	Candidate	Votes	%	±%
Liberal	George Bukator	12,403	52.07	+13.13
Progressive Conservative	Keith Lougheed	8,058	33.83	–14.89
Co-operative Commonwealth	Fred Jeavons	3,357	14.09	+3.25
Total valid votes		23,818	98.83	
Total rejected ballots		281	1.17	–0.47
Turnout		24,099	59.22	+1.55
Eligible voters		40,692		
Liberal gain from Progressive Conservative		Swing		+14.01
Source: Elections Ontario

1955 Ontario general election
Party	Candidate	Votes	%	±%
Progressive Conservative	Arthur Jolley	10,354	48.72	–3.96
Liberal	George Bukator	8,276	38.94	+2.08
Co-operative Commonwealth	Pat Spain	2,305	10.85	+1.86
Labor–Progressive	Mary Price	316	1.49	+0.02
Total valid votes		21,251	98.36	
Total rejected ballots		354	1.64	+0.33
Turnout		21,605	57.67	+4.78
Eligible voters		37,462		
Progressive Conservative hold		Swing		–3.02
Source: Elections Ontario

Ontario provincial by-election, October 26, 1953 Resignation of William Houck to enter federal politics
Party	Candidate	Votes	%	±%
Progressive Conservative	Arthur Jolley	10,484	52.69	+19.49
Liberal	Grant Donald	7,335	36.86	–11.93
Co-operative Commonwealth	Patrick Spain	1,788	8.99	–9.03
Labor–Progressive	Mary Price	292	1.47	–
Total valid votes		19,899	98.69	
Total rejected ballots		264	1.31	+0.20
Turnout		20,163	52.89	–8.69
Eligible voters		38,124		
Progressive Conservative gain from Liberal		Swing		+15.71
Source: Elections Ontario

1951 Ontario general election
Party	Candidate	Votes	%	±%
Liberal	William Houck	10,209	48.79	+8.72
Progressive Conservative	Arthur Jolley	6,946	33.20	+10.95
Co-operative Commonwealth	Joseph David Bacon	3,769	18.01	–19.67
Total valid votes		20,924	98.89	
Total rejected ballots		234	1.11	–0.06
Turnout		21,158	61.58	–6.37
Eligible voters		34,361		
Liberal hold		Swing		+9.84
Source: Elections Ontario

1948 Ontario general election
Party	Candidate	Votes	%	±%
Liberal	William Houck	8,253	40.07	+7.59
Co-operative Commonwealth	Gordon H. Bates	7,762	37.69	+6.46
Progressive Conservative	A. C. Douglas	4,582	22.25	–11.14
Total valid votes		20,597	98.84	
Total rejected ballots		242	1.16	–0.18
Turnout		20,839	67.94	–1.77
Eligible voters		30,671		
Liberal gain from Progressive Conservative		Swing		+9.37
Source: Elections Ontario

1945 Ontario general election
Party	Candidate	Votes	%	±%
Progressive Conservative	Carl Hanniwell	7,014	33.39	+9.92
Liberal	William Houck	6,822	32.47	+1.70
Co-operative Commonwealth	Cyril Overall	6,560	31.23	–14.53
Labor–Progressive	Clark Campbell	611	2.91	–
Total valid votes		21,007	98.66	
Total rejected ballots		285	1.34	+0.43
Turnout		21,292	69.72	+8.42
Eligible voters		30,541		
Progressive Conservative gain from Co-operative Commonwealth		Swing		+12.23
Source: Elections Ontario

1943 Ontario general election
Party	Candidate	Votes	%	±%
Co-operative Commonwealth	Cyril Overall	7,519	45.76	+41.57
Liberal	William Houck	5,057	30.78	–29.61
Progressive Conservative	George R. Inglis	3,856	23.47	–6.89
Total valid votes		16,432	99.09	
Total rejected ballots		151	0.91	–0.88
Turnout		16,583	61.29	–7.54
Eligible voters		27,056		
Co-operative Commonwealth gain from Liberal		Swing		+24.23
Source: Elections Ontario

1937 Ontario general election
Party	Candidate	Votes	%	±%
Liberal	William Houck	10,225	60.39	+7.27
Conservative	William Gore Willson	5,140	30.36	+0.49
Farm-Labour	Simeon Corfield	857	5.06	–
Co-operative Commonwealth	Thomas C. Daly	710	4.19	–12.82
Total valid votes		16,932	98.21	
Total rejected ballots		309	1.79	+0.75
Turnout		17,241	68.83	–4.21
Eligible voters		25,048		
Liberal hold		Swing		+3.39
Source: Elections Ontario

1934 Ontario general election
Party	Candidate	Votes	%	±%
Liberal	William Houck	9,096	53.12	+18.05
Conservative	William Gore Willson	5,114	29.86	–35.07
Co-operative Commonwealth	R. F. Booth	2,914	17.02	–
Total valid votes		17,124	98.96	
Total rejected ballots		180	1.04	+0.12
Turnout		17,304	73.04	+27.54
Eligible voters		23,691		
Liberal gain from Conservative		Swing		+26.56
Source: Elections Ontario

1929 Ontario general election
Party	Candidate	Votes	%	±%
Conservative	William Gore Willson	6,713	64.94	–3.65
Liberal	Carlton Fisher Monroe	3,625	35.06	+3.65
Total valid votes		10,338	99.08	
Total rejected ballots		96	0.92	+0.47
Turnout		10,434	45.50	–7.30
Eligible voters		22,934		
Conservative hold		Swing		–3.65
Source: Elections Ontario

1926 Ontario general election
Party	Candidate	Votes	%	±%
Conservative	William Gore Willson	7,900	68.58	+16.61
Liberal	William Prior Dixon	3,619	31.42	+8.77
Total valid votes		11,519	99.55	
Total rejected ballots		52	0.45	–2.30
Turnout		11,571	52.80	+4.77
Eligible voters		21,916		
Conservative hold		Swing		+3.92
Source: Elections Ontario

1923 Ontario general election
Party	Candidate	Votes	%	±%
Conservative	William Gore Willson	4,922	51.97	+25.24
Labour	Charles Swayze	2,404	25.38	–12.99
Liberal	George B. Snyder	2,145	22.65	–12.25
Total valid votes		9,471	97.25	
Total rejected ballots		268	2.75	–1.55
Turnout		9,739	48.03	–26.17
Eligible voters		20,278		
Conservative gain from Labour		Swing		+18.74
Source: Elections Ontario

1919 Ontario general election
Party	Candidate	Votes	%	±%
Labour	Charles Swayze	4,057	38.37	–
Liberal	Carlton Fisher Monroe	3,689	34.89	+2.30
Conservative	George Musgrove	2,826	26.73	–27.28
Total valid votes		10,572	95.70	
Total rejected ballots		475	4.30	+3.16
Turnout		11,047	74.20	+0.27
Eligible voters		14,889		
Labour gain from Conservative		Swing		–
Source: Elections Ontario

1914 Ontario general election
Party	Candidate	Votes	%
Conservative	George Musgrove	2,444	54.01
Liberal	Harry Punshon Stephens	1,475	32.60
Socialist	Sidney Burrows	606	13.39
Total valid votes		4,525	98.86
Total rejected ballots		52	1.14
Turnout		4,577	73.93
Eligible voters		6,191	
Conservative pickup new district.			
Source: Elections Ontario

== Student vote results ==
2018 Niagara Falls student vote result
Affiliation	Candidate	Votes	%
New Democratic	Wayne Gates	1,552	63.89
Progressive Conservative	Chuck McShane	432	17.79
Green	Karen Fraser	193	7.95
Liberal	Dean Demizio	178	7.33
Libertarian	Shaun Somers	42	1.73
Moderate	Goran Zubic	32	1.32
Source: Student Vote

== 2007 electoral reform referendum ==
2007 Ontario electoral reform referendum
Side	Votes	%
First Past the Post	29,259	64.6
Mixed member proportional	16,013	35.4
Total valid votes	45,272	100.0

== See also ==
- List of Ontario provincial electoral districts
- Canadian provincial electoral districts
