= Bill Smeaton (politician) =

Former mayor of Niagara Falls from 1983 to 1991

21st Mayor of Niagara Falls
- In office 1983–1991
- Preceded by: Wayne Thomson
- Succeeded by: Wayne Thomson

Personal details
- Party: Independent
- Occupation: Politician

Bill Smeaton is a former Canadian politician who served as mayor of Niagara Falls from 1983 to 1991. First elected to Niagara Falls City Council as an alderman in 1973, he was elected mayor in a 1983 by-election following the resignation of Wayne Thomson, and was subsequently re-elected in the municipal elections of 1985 and 1998. In the 1991 municipal election, Thomson ran for mayor again, while Smeaton ran for a seat on Niagara Regional Council, serving on that body until his retirement from politics in 2010.

He was appointed as a citizenship judge in February 2011.
