= Arthur Jolley =

Canadian politician

Ontario MPP
- In office 1953–1959
- Preceded by: William Houck
- Succeeded by: George Bukator
- Constituency: Niagara Falls

Personal details
- Born: November 29, 1911 Hamilton, Ontario
- Died: April 24, 1993 (aged 81) Niagara Falls, Ontario
- Party: Progressive Conservative
- Occupation: Businessman

Arthur Connaught Jolley (November 29, 1911 – April 24, 1993) was a Canadian politician, who represented the electoral district of Niagara Falls in the Legislative Assembly of Ontario from 1953 to 1959. He was a member of the Ontario Progressive Conservative Party.

He was first elected in a by-election on October 26, 1953, following the resignation of William Houck. He was then re-elected in the 1955 election.

Prior to his election to the legislature, Jolley was a partner with his brother Leonard in Jolley Construction. He served four years in the Canadian Armed Forces, and served for four years on Niagara Falls City Council. In his later years, he was co-host of a weekend program on CKTB devoted to music of the 1920s, 1930s and 1940s.

Following his death in 1993, statements of tribute were delivered in the legislature by Shirley Coppen, Jim Bradley and Al McLean.
