= Margaret Harrington =

Canadian politician

Ontario MPP
- In office 1990–1995
- Preceded by: Vince Kerrio
- Succeeded by: Bart Maves
- Constituency: Niagara Falls

Personal details
- Born: October 4, 1945 (age 80) Warwick, England
- Party: New Democrat
- Spouse: Dick Harrington
- Children: 2
- Occupation: Teacher
- Portfolio: Deputy Speaker (1993-1995)

Margaret Helen Harrington (born October 4, 1945) is a Canadian teacher and former politician in Ontario, Canada. She was a New Democratic Party member of the Legislative Assembly of Ontario from 1990 to 1995.

== Background ==
Harrington was educated at Queen's University in Kingston, Ontario, receiving a Bachelor of Science degree in Biochemistry. She worked as a secondary school teacher in Niagara Falls after her graduation, and served as city councillor of the Niagara Falls City Council. In 1988, she was named Niagara Falls Woman of the Year. Her husband, Dick Harrington, ran for the federal and provincial New Democratic Party on three occasions. She and her husband had two children, Kevin and Jennifer.

== Politics ==
Harrington ran for the Ontario legislature in the 1987 provincial election, and finished second against Liberal Vince Kerrio in the riding of Niagara Falls. She lost by 5,664 votes. Three years later, in the 1990 provincial election, she defeated Liberal candidate Wayne Campbell by almost 6,000 votes in the same riding. The NDP won a majority government and Harrington was appointed as parliamentary assistant to the Minister of Housing from 1990 to 1993. She was then appointed as a Deputy Speaker.

Shortly after the election, Harrington was accused of improprieties on voting day. She admitted to improperly adding two names to the voter's list. She claimed that she was mistaken about the rules for adding names to the list. The Ontario Elections Act states that people may be added to the voting list on a provincial election day only in rural polling divisions, not urban ones like Niagara Falls. Warren Bailie, Chief Election Officer ruled that no further action was required since Harrington won the election by more than two votes.

In 1993 she came out against the government's proposal to build a casino in Niagara Falls but reversed her position a year later when she supported the plan.

The NDP were defeated in the 1995 provincial election, and Harrington finished third against Progressive Conservative Bart Maves in her bid for re-election.

When Bob Rae stepped down as party leader she supported Tony Silipo for leader of the party.

=== Electoral record ===
1990 Ontario general election: Niagara Falls
Party	Candidate	Votes	%
New Democratic	Margaret Harrington	13,884	46.24
Liberal	Wayne Campbell	7,979	26.67
Progressive Conservative	Norm Puttick	3,869	12.93
Confederation of Regions	Ted Wiwchar	3,141	10.50
Family Coalition	Art Klassen	674	2.25
Green	Donald MacDonald-Ross	365	1.22
Total valid votes		29,912	100.00

1995 Ontario general election: Niagara Falls
Party	Candidate	Votes	%	±%	Expenditures
Progressive Conservative	Bart Maves	12,132	43.33	+30.4	$37,908.69
Liberal	Marg Germano	8,289	29.60	+2.93	$40,823.66
New Democratic	Margaret Harrington	7,034	25.12	−21.12	$15,733.37
Natural Law	Bill Amos	355	1.27		$0.00
Independent	Melania Gural	189	0.68		not listed
Total valid votes		27,999	100.00		
Rejected, unmarked and declined ballots		388	1.37		
Turnout		28,387	59.48		
Electors on the lists		47,729			
