= Carl Hanniwell =

Canadian politician

MPP for Niagara Falls
- In office 1945–1948
- Preceded by: Cyril Overall
- Succeeded by: William Houck

Mayor of Niagara Falls
- In office 1938–1939
- Preceded by: Charles Anderson
- Succeeded by: George Inglis

Personal details
- Born: Carl David Hanniwell; May 28, 1903 St. David's, Ontario, Canada
- Died: April 22, 1969 (aged 65) Niagara Falls, Ontario, Canada
- Party: Progressive Conservative
- Profession: Politician

Carl David Hanniwell (May 28, 1903 – April 22, 1969) was a Canadian politician who served as a member of the Ontario legislature and as a municipal politician.

He served as an alderman and later as mayor of Niagara Falls. He was mayor from 1938 until 1939. He was elected to the 22nd Legislative Assembly of Ontario in 1945, serving from June 4, 1945, until April 27, 1948. Later, he was vice-chairman of Ontario Hydro.
