= 2014 Niagara Region municipal elections =

Municipal elections in Niagra, Ontario

Elections were held in the Niagara Region of Ontario on October 27, 2014 in conjunction with municipal elections across the province.

== Niagara Regional Council ==
| Position | Elected |
|---|---|
| Fort Erie Mayor | Wayne H. Redekop |
| Fort Erie Councillor | Sandy Annunziata |
| Grimsby Mayor | Bob Bentley |
| Grimsby Councillor | Tony Quirk |
| Lincoln Mayor | Sandra Easton |
| Lincoln Councillor | Bill Hodgson |
| Niagara Falls Mayor | Jim Diodati |
| Niagara Falls Councillor | Bob Gale |
| Niagara Falls Councillor | Bart Maves |
| Niagara Falls Councillor | Selina Volpatti |
| Niagara-on-the-Lake Lord Mayor | Patrick Darte |
| Niagara-on-the-Lake Councillor | Gary Burroughs |
| Pelham Mayor | Dave Augustyn |
| Pelham Councillor | Brian Baty |
| Port Colborne Mayor | John Maloney |
| Port Colborne Councillor | David Barrick |
| St. Catharines Mayor | Walter Sendzik |
| St. Catharines Councillor | Tim Rigby |
| St. Catharines Councillor | Bruce Timms |
| St. Catharines Councillor | Brian Heit |
| St. Catharines Councillor | Alan Caslin |
| St. Catharines Councillor | Andy Petrowski |
| St. Catharines Councillor | Debbie MacGregor |
| Thorold Mayor | Angelo Theodore Luciani |
| Thorold Councillor | Henry D'Angela |
| Wainfleet Mayor | April Jeffs |
| Welland Mayor | Frank Campion |
| Welland Councillor | Paul Grenier |
| Welland Councillor | George H. Marshall |
| West Lincoln Mayor | Douglas Joyner |

== Fort Erie ==
| Mayoral Candidate | Vote | % |
|---|---|---|
| Wayne H. Redekop | 5,329 | 50.63 |
| Stephen Passero | 2,734 | 25.98 |
| Ann-Marie Noyes | 1,722 | 16.36 |
| Dean Demizio | 617 | 5.86 |
| Mike Cloutier | 123 | 1.17 |

== Grimsby ==
| Mayoral Candidate | Vote | % |
|---|---|---|
| Bob Bentley (X) | 4,018 | 48.68 |
| Wayne Fertich | 3,037 | 36.79 |
| Robert Greco | 619 | 7.50 |
| Tony Serafini | 580 | 7.03 |

== Lincoln ==
| Mayoral Candidate | Vote | % |
|---|---|---|
| Sandra Easton | 2,312 | 35.65 |
| John Kralt | 1,659 | 25.58 |
| Rob Condotta | 1,257 | 19.38 |
| Eric Gilbert | 1,056 | 16.28 |
| Alvin Danyluck | 202 | 3.11 |

== Niagara Falls ==
| Mayoral Candidate | Vote | % |
|---|---|---|
| Jim Diodati (X) | 17,968 | 84.55 |
| Connie Topolinsky | 1,931 | 9.09 |
| Ringo Beam | 970 | 4.56 |
| Joseph Mikos | 383 | 1.80 |

== Niagara-on-the-Lake ==
| Lord Mayoral Candidate | Vote | % |
|---|---|---|
| Patrick Darte | 3,627 | 57.12 |
| Dave Eke (X) | 2,723 | 42.88 |

== Pelham ==
| Mayoral Candidate | Vote | % |
|---|---|---|
| Dave Augustyn (X) | 3,256 | 53.59 |
| Zachary Junkin | 1,834 | 30.18 |
| Mark Bay | 986 | 16.23 |

== Port Colborne ==
| Mayoral Candidate | Vote | % |
|---|---|---|
| John Maloney | 3,911 | 57.49 |
| Fred Davies | 2,258 | 32.53 |
| Michael Sloat | 693 | 9.98 |

== St. Catharines ==
2014 St. Catharines municipal election
- October 27, 2014
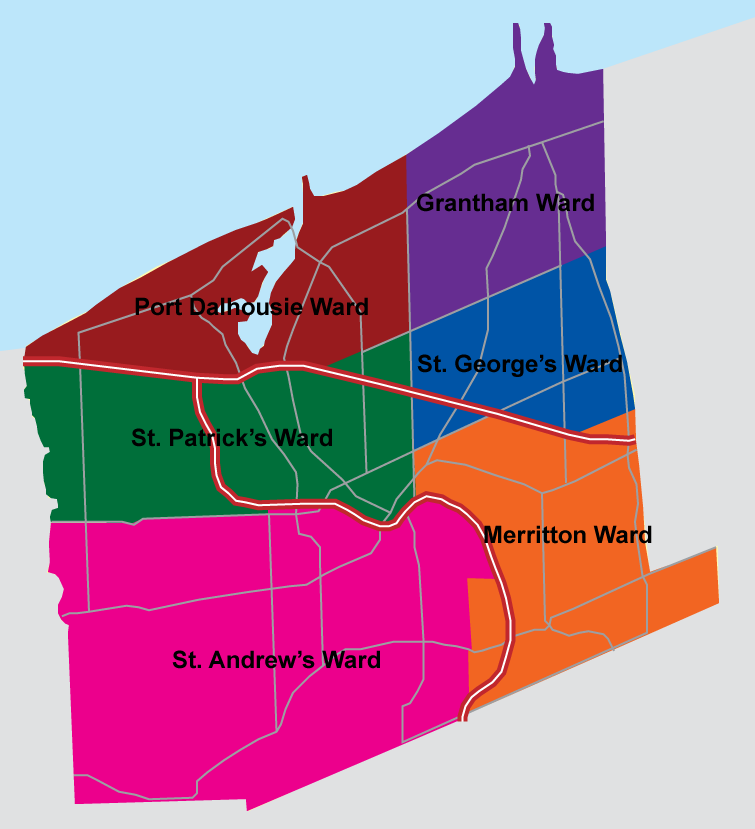
- The Ward boundaries for the 2014 Election. The Mayor and regional councillors are elected across the city, Councillors in their respective wards.
Mayor before election
Brian McMullan
Elected mayor
Walter Sendzik

The 2014 St. Catharines municipal election took place on Monday October 27, 2014 to determine a mayor, regional and city councillors and school trustees in the city of St. Catharines, Ontario. The incumbent mayor, Brian McMullan, vacated the mayoral position, declining to run for re-election.

=== Mayor ===
| Mayoral Candidate | Vote | % |
|---|---|---|
| Walter Sendzik | 13,147 | 40.19 |
| Jeff Burch | 11,321 | 34.61 |
| Peter Secord | 6,571 | 20.09 |
| Mark Stevens | 1,135 | 3.47 |
| Jim Fannon | 535 | 1.64 |

=== Niagara Regional Council (6 elected) ===
| Candidate | Total votes | % of total votes |
|---|---|---|
| Tim Rigby (i) | 15,063 | 7.60% |
| Bruce Timms (i) | 15,010 | 7.58% |
| Brian Heit (i) | 12,396 | 6.26% |
| Alan Caslin (i) | 11,133 | 5.62% |
| Andrew Petrowski (i) | 10,676 | 5.39% |
| Debbie MacGregor | 10,110 | 5.10% |
| Kelly Edgar | 8,380 | 4.23% |
| Len Stack | 7,281 | 3.68% |
| Al Rempel | 4,252 | 3.63% |
| Robert McCready | 5,214 | 2.63% |
| Lou Felice | 4,222 | 2.13% |
| Sean Polden | 4,026 | 2.03% |
| Calvin Jessome | 3,531 | 1.78% |
| Shawn Marriott | 2,679 | 1.35% |
| Willy Noiles | 2,409 | 1.22% |
| Total valid votes | 198,096 | 100.00 |

=== St. Catharines City Council ===
2 candidates are elected in each ward..

==== Ward 1 - Merriton ====
| Candidate | Total votes | % of total vote |
|---|---|---|
| Jennie Stevens (i) | 2,423 | 27.32% |
| David Haywood | 1,557 | 17.56% |
| Brandon Curie | 1,092 | 12.31% |
| Leslie Seaborne | 1,023 | 11.54% |
| Marta Liddiard | 676 | 7.62% |
| Geoffrey Black | 311 | 3.51% |
| Total valid votes | 8,868 | 100.00 |

==== Ward 2 - St. Andrew's ====
| Candidate | Total votes | % of total vote |
|---|---|---|
| Joseph Kushner (X) | 3,194 | 29.70 |
| Matthew Harris (X) | 2,974 | 27.65% |
| Paul Miil | 980 | 9.11 |
| Raymond D'Archi | 735 | 6.83 |
| Total valid votes | 10,756 | 100.00 |

==== Ward 3 - St. George's ====
| Candidate | Total votes | % of total vote |
|---|---|---|
| Mike BRITTON (X) | 1,813 | 20.20 |
| Sal SORRENTO (X) | 1,554 | 17.31 |
| Laura IP | 1,274 | 14.19 |
| Andrew MUEHLENBECK | 883 | 9.84 |
| John KEDZIERSKI | 643 | 7.16 |
| Robert GEORGE | 406 | 4.52 |
| Tony TULLO | 403 | 4.49 |
| Dave KEY | 185 | 2.06 |
| Total valid votes | 8,976 | 100.00 |

==== Ward 4 - St. Patrick's ====
- Mark Elliott
- Mat Siscoe

==== Ward 5 - Grantham ====
- Bill Phillips
- Sandie Bellows

==== Ward 6 - Port Dalhousie ====
- Bruce Williamson
- Carlos Garcia

=== Niagara Catholic District School Board ===
==== Trustee, Ward 1 ====
- Rhianon Burkholder (incumbent)
- Pat Vernal

==== Trustee, Ward 2-6 (2 Elected) ====
- Kathy Burtnik (incumbent)

== Thorold ==
| Mayoral Candidate | Vote | % |
|---|---|---|
| Ted Luciani (X) | 1,940 | 37.63 |
| Robert Gabriel | 1,897 | 36.79 |
| Terry Dow | 1,319 | 25.58 |

== Wainfleet ==
| Mayoral Candidate | Vote | % |
|---|---|---|
| April Jeffs (X) | 1,407 | 46.25 |
| Barbara Henderson | 781 | 25.67 |
| Laurie Dayboll | 660 | 21.70 |
| Dale Tucker | 194 | 6.38 |

== Welland ==
| Mayoral Candidate | Vote | % |
|---|---|---|
| Frank Campion | 8,043 | 59.89 |
| Barry Sharpe (X) | 4,930 | 36.71 |
| John Watt | 457 | 3.40 |

== West Lincoln ==
| Mayoral Candidate | Vote | % |
|---|---|---|
| Douglas Joyner (X) | 1,570 | 37.79 |
| Paul Keizer | 1,333 | 32.08 |
| Katie Trombetta | 727 | 17.50 |
| John Glazier | 381 | 9.17 |
| Stefanos Karatopis | 144 | 3.47 |
