= Vince Kerrio =

Canadian businessman and politician

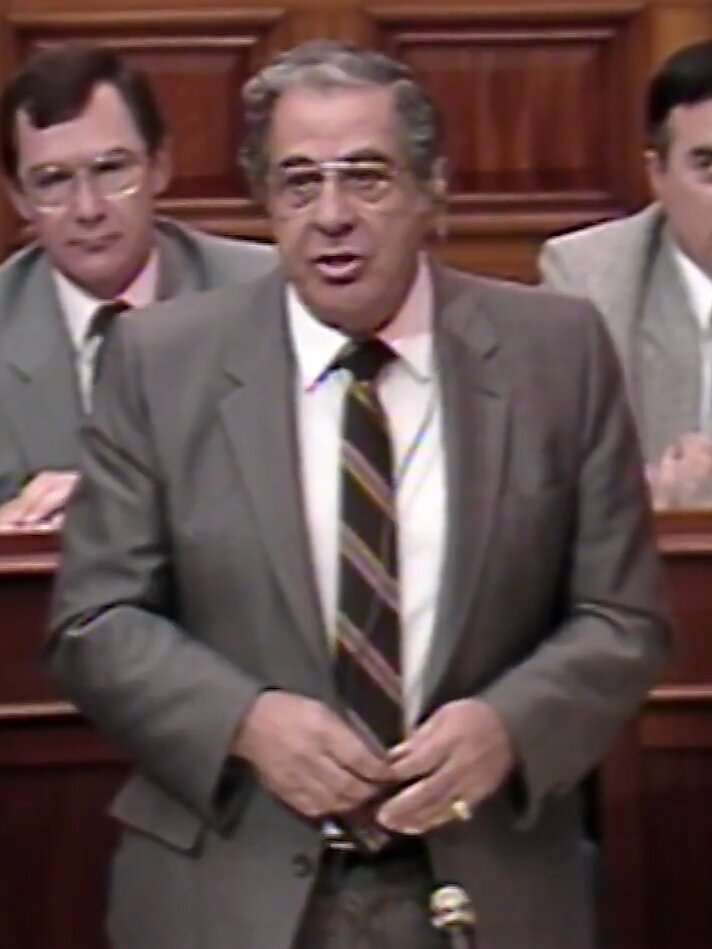
- Kerrio in 1986

Ontario MPP
- In office 1975–1990
- Preceded by: John Clement
- Succeeded by: Margaret Harrington
- Constituency: Niagara Falls

Personal details
- Born: Vincent George Kerrio; February 5, 1924 Niagara Falls, Ontario, Canada
- Died: October 30, 2009 (aged 85) Niagara Falls, Ontario, Canada
- Party: Liberal
- Spouse: Rose
- Children: 2
- Occupation: Businessman

Vincent George Kerrio (February 5, 1924 – October 30, 2009) was a businessperson and politician in Ontario, Canada. He served in the Legislative Assembly of Ontario as a Liberal from 1975 to 1990, and was a cabinet minister in the government of David Peterson. He was the first Italian-Canadian to serve as a cabinet minister in Ontario.

== Background ==
Kerrio's grandfather, also named Vincent, emigrated from Italy to Canada at the start of the twentieth century. Kerrio was born in Niagara Falls and educated at Niagara Falls Collegiate Vocational Institute (NFCVI). Kerrio began working in the family business, then Kerrio Welding Works, in the 1930s. The company became Kerrio and Germano Construction and later Kerrio Construction, and the younger Kerrio its president. He was also the president of the Niagara Falls Curling Club. Kerrio and his wife Rose had two sons, Vincent Anthony and Michael. Vincent Anthony succeeded his father in the family business and became a member of Niagara Falls City Council.

== Politics ==
He was elected to the Ontario legislature in the 1975 provincial election, defeating incumbent Progressive Conservative John Clement by 172 votes in the Niagara Falls riding. He was re-elected by greater margins in the elections of 1977 and 1981.

The Ontario Liberal Party, which had been out of office since 1943, formed a minority government after the 1985 provincial election. Kerrio, easily returned in Niagara Falls, was appointed Minister of Natural Resources and Minister of Energy on June 26, 1985. He was retained in the former portfolio after the 1987 provincial election. In 1988, Kerrio prohibited mineral exploration and mining activities in Ontario provincial parks. He banned large-scale water exports from Ontario in 1989. He also oversaw the reintroduction of the wild turkey to Ontario.

In 1988, Kerrio approved the expansion of the Red Squirrel logging road, directly through Anishnabe territory in Temagami, Ontario, Canada. This prompted a series of roadblocks by the Teme-Augama Anishnabai and by environmentalists in 1988-1989. Kerrio was a prominent supporter of the "Beck 3" plan to build a third hydroelectric generating station on the Niagara River.

Kerrio left cabinet on August 2, 1989, and did not run for re-election in 1990.

=== Cabinet positions ===
Peterson ministry, Province of Ontario (1985–1990)
Cabinet posts (2)
Predecessor	Office	Successor
Alan Pope	Minister of Natural Resources; 1985–1989	Lyn McLeod
Mike Harris	Minister of Energy; 1985–1987	Bob Wong

== Later life ==
Kerrio remained a leading figure in Niagara Falls's Italian community. In addition to Kerrio Construction, his family came to run Can-Mar Manufacturing and Niagara Hospitality Inns. He died on October 30, 2009, at Greater Niagara General Hospital where he had been hospitalized with leukaemia for six months. Kerrio's spouse, Rose, died from natural causes on February 7, 2021.
