= George Bukator =

Canadian politician (1913–1987)

19th Mayor of Niagara Falls
- In office 1973–1978
- Preceded by: Franklin Miller
- Succeeded by: Wayne Thomson

Ontario MPP
- In office 1959–1971
- Preceded by: Arthur Jolley
- Succeeded by: John Clement
- Constituency: Niagara Falls

Personal details
- Born: April 24, 1913; Lachine, Quebec, Canada
- Died: May 2, 1987 (aged 74); Niagara Falls, Ontario, Canada
- Political party: Liberal
- Spouse: Bernice Scott
- Children: 3
- Occupation: Businessman

George Bukator (April 24, 1913 – May 2, 1987) was a Canadian politician and Ontario political figure. He represented Niagara Falls in the Legislative Assembly of Ontario from 1958 to 1971 as a Liberal member.

He served with the Niagara Parks Commission for six years. He was also reeve of Chippawa from 1949 to 1958 and warden for Welland County in 1951. Bukator was the nineteenth mayor of Niagara Falls from 1973 to 1978. He died in hospital at Niagara Falls.

A park on the Welland River was named in his honour.
