= Paul Manning (police officer, born 1973) =

Canadian police officer

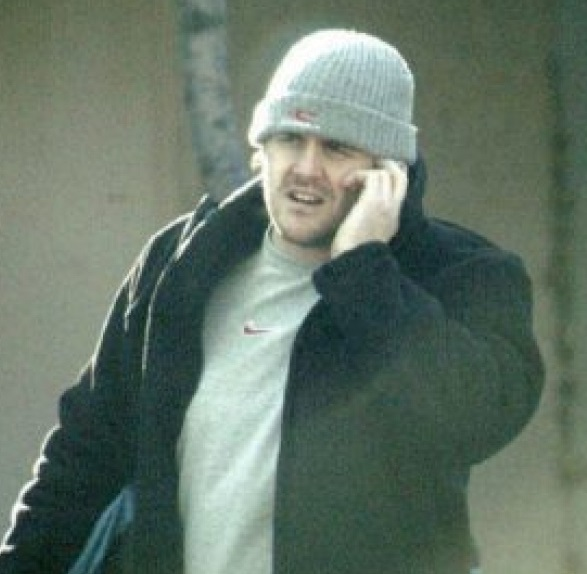
- Manning undercover in Hamilton, circa 2006
- Born: 21 September 1973 (age 53); Accrington, England
- Other names: 'Paul Wright', 'The Englishman'
- Height: 1.82 m (6 ft 0 in)

Paul Manning (born September 21, 1973), also known by the pseudonyms Paul Wright and the Englishman, is a former Hamilton Police Service officer (Ontario, Canada), Metropolitan Police Service officer (London, UK) and Royal Military Police officer (UK) who worked undercover in an Ontario Provincial Police and Hamilton Police Service joint task force for 18 months, successfully infiltrating the Musitano crime family, Papalia crime family and the Hamilton chapter of Hells Angels.

Manning alleges he was sold out by other serving officers affiliated with organized criminals while working undercover and that an attempt was made on his life by members of the Front Lines Bloods. He further alleges years of police corruption and cover-ups, most of which remain unproven or uninvestigated.

== Biography ==
Manning was born in Accrington, Lancashire, UK, on September 21, 1973, attending Rhyddings High School. In 1993 he joined the Royal Military Police and the Metropolitan Police Service around 1998, immigrating to Canada in 2005, joining Hamilton Police Service sometime in summer 2005.

== Project Scopa ==
Manning was recruited to work undercover because of his previous, extensive undercover experience and he was a recent immigrant to Canada, therefore an unknown.

Manning's assignment was to infiltrate the James St North area of Hamilton, a tight-knit community of both residential properties and small businesses with strong Italian and Portuguese influences. Traditional organized crime has, and still continues to maintain a grip over the small community. Manning was to penetrate through deception, this historically difficult and extremely dangerous crime group. He was to gather evidence on offences for future prosecution, in an attempt to disrupt and dissuade further criminal activity.

Manning spent over a year living in the community, engaging in criminal acts. His cover was consistently tested; he was the victim of an attempted murder and would be subjected to mock executions in an attempt to ascertain if he was an undercover police officer. In late 2006 the operation was compromised due to an intelligence breach suffered by the Ontario Provincial Police.

In a $6.75 million lawsuit filed by Manning and his wife, Sabina Manning, Manning alleges he was sold out by other Hamilton Police Service officers, and that the operation was intentionally compromised to disguise that fact. He describes the uncovering and reporting of years of criminality on the part of serving and retired officers.

== Aftermath ==
In the lawsuit, Manning details his years of battling mental illness because of the assault and not only the lack of assistance from his senior management team, but their continued bullying of an officer turned whistleblower.

Manning was subsequently diagnosed with post-traumatic stress disorder related to the attempted murder.

On May 28, 2016, a story, which mentions Manning's lawsuit, was published by The Hamilton Spectator indicating criminality on the part of a senior investigator at Hamilton Police Service, who subsequently killed himself. This investigator is not only mentioned in Manning's lawsuit, but the story somewhat corroborates what Manning alleges and directly accuses senior management at Hamilton Police Service of covering up wrongdoing.

On February 14, 2019 the City of Hamilton were ordered to pay Manning $20,000 because of unnecessary delays in a lawsuit the officer brought against the Hamilton Police Services Board and former Chief Glenn De Caire. The amount awarded Manning and his wife, Sabina, was to cover court costs and as a deterrent to the city against any further delays.

On September 17, 2019 the City of Hamilton were ordered to pay Manning a further $40,000 because of additional delays in the same lawsuit. Ontario Superior Court Master P. Tamara Sugunasiri took the unusual step of striking the defendants defence, meaning the Hamilton Police Service Board and Glenn DeCaire lost their right to keep defending this action. In her ruling Sugunasiri added: "The continued failure to respect the process, the rules and opposing counsel's time and efforts is unacceptable and rises to the level of bringing the administration of justice into disrepute."

The lawsuit was filed September 2015 and is still pending.

== Ottawa Recordings ==
Sometime during the week of July 23, 2018 Manning began uploading partial audio recordings to YouTube that claimed to be of Ottawa Police Association president Matthew Skof. In multiple calls, Skof reveals information on an active undercover operation targeting El-Chantiry and makes allegations that Eli El-Chantiry, the Ottawa Police Service Board chair is involved in organized crime.

In response to the release of the partial recordings, on July 23, 2018 Chief Charles Bordeleau initiated a Chief's complaint asking the Ontario Provincial Police to launch an investigation "focused directly on the origins of the recordings and the individuals involved". The Ottawa Police Service has repeatedly refused to investigate allegations of criminal conduct by El-Chantiry, in the form of land development dealings, bribes and election campaign fraud.

At first Skof vehemently denied it was him talking in the recordings and stood by El-Chantiry in a media conference. After the source provided evidence to the Ottawa Citizen and agreed to an anonymous interview, on July 30, 2018 retracted his denial and admitted it was his voice on the recordings.

Manning then uploaded a further partial recording in which Skof alleged members of the Ottawa Police Service senior management team had tried to obstruct justice in a prior Ontario Provincial Police investigation.

On September 27, 2018 Bordeleau instructed law firm Caza Saikaley LLP to request a mandatory injunction ordering Manning to "cease the dissemination and broadcast of any video and audio recordings which implicate the privacy interests of, and negatively impact the OPS and its members."

Manning claimed to the Ottawa Citizen that it "is a badly veiled attempt to hide tapes from the public of one of their own members alleging criminal wrongdoing against senior management and others."

The recordings were removed from social media, and on November 7, 2018 a ‘Notice of Discontinuance’ was filed with the courts.

On January 22, 2019 Matthew Skof was arrested by the Ontario Provincial Police and charged with multiple counts of Criminal Breach of Trust and Obstruction of Justice.

== Halton Regional Police ==
On January 8, 2021, through Twitter Manning made the allegation that the Halton Regional Police Chief, Stephen Tanner was vacationing in Florida during a COVID-19 Provincial lockdown. Tanner admitted he was out of country and apologized to his officers and the community, stating he had permission from the Police Services Board Chair, Oakville Mayor, Rob Burton. Mayor Burton was subsequently forced to resign from the board.

The Halton Police Services Board met several times to decide Tanner's future with Halton Regional Police releasing a statement on January 21, 2021 stating the board expressed its “full and unequivocal confidence” in Tanner and confirmed that they will not be taking “any further action.”

== Theories ==
In an April 30, 2019 interview with The Buffalo News, Manning claimed the FBI assertion that the Mafia no longer had an active presence in Buffalo, NY was wrong. After a spate of Mafia murders in Canada, Manning asserted "There's a massive power play underway and it's tied to Buffalo." Adding he believed Dominic Violi, son of the late Mafia Boss Paulo Violi, was an "underboss" in the Buffalo Crime Family.

In a December 17, 2019 interview with ABC's 7 Eyewitness News, Manning claimed recent Homeland Security and FBI raids were tied directly into Italian Organized Crime and Transnational Organized Crime.

== Book ==
In 2024, Manning released Ten Seventy Eight: An Undercover Officer’s Battle Against Organized Crime and Police Corruption, a gripping account of his covert operations and the corruption he uncovered within law enforcement. The book, which details his infiltration of a powerful criminal organization while exposing systemic failures from within, quickly became an Amazon Bestseller.

== Politics ==
Manning is running for mayor of Niagara Falls, Ontario in the 2026 municipal elections.

== Sources ==
- Taekema, Dan (2 Feb 2022)

Hamilton police officer guilty of discreditable conduct has 7 days to resign or be fired "CBC News"

- Rankin, Jim; Edwards, Peter; Buist, Steve (April 21, 2016). "Hamilton Cop Alleges Betrayal By His Force". The Toronto Star. Archived from the original on 2016-04-21.
- Buist, Steve; Rankin, Jim; Edwards, Peter (21 April 2016) Ex-Undercover hamilton Cop Alleges Betrayal By His Own Force The Hamilton Spectator
- (21 April 2016) Undercover Lawsuit CHCH News
- Bennett, Kelly (10 May 2016) Once Undercover, hamilton Cop alleges Police didn't have his back CBC News
- (21 April 2016) Former Cop Suing Hamilton Police and OPP 900 CHML
- (21 April 2016) Former Cop Suing Hamilton Police and OPP AM 730
- Edwards, Peter (21 April 2016) Undercover Cop Alleges Betrayal; worked Hells Angels, Mafia Peter Edwards Blog
- (21 April 2016) Former Cop Suing Hamilton Police and OPP 'i880am'
- Buist, Steve; Hayes, Molly; Dunphy, Bill (28 May 2016) Spectator Investigation: Sex, Drugs and Police Misconduct The Hamilton Spectator
- Dreschel, Andrew (1 June 2016) Police Board Asking Tough Questions on Officer Misconduct The Hamilton Spectator
- Edwards, Peter (July 30, 2017). "Shootings, Explosions, Killings and the Bloody Fight to be 'The Next Boss' after Mobster Vito Rizzuto's Death". The Toronto Star. Archived from the original on 2017-07-30.
- Browne, Rachel (31 August 2017) Ontario May Be In The Midst Of A Mob War Vice News
- Metelsky, Stephen G (11 February 2018) Illegal Gambling Underworld Stories
- Hepfner, Lisa (26 April 2018) Ruthowsky Challenges Sentence CHCH News
- Helmer, Aedan (24 July 2018) Leaked Ottawa Police Service Audio Recordings Ottawa Citizen
- Helmer, Aedan; Fenton, Drake (30 July 2018) Police Union Boss Admits To Being Voice On Parts Of Leaked Audio Tapes Ottawa Citizen
- Manning, Paul; (14 September 2018) Coroner's Office Directs Police Reopen Investigation Exaro News
- Edwards, Peter; O'Reilly, Nicole (September 14, 2018). "Hamilton Police Probing Ancaster Homicide". The Toronto Star. Archived from the original on 2018-09-14.
- Edwards, Peter (September 17, 2018). "Buffalo Mob Playing Role in Deadly Ontario Dispute". The Toronto Star. Archived from the original on 2018-09-17.
- Manning, Paul; (17 December 2018) Did Premier Ford oversee the Obstruction of Justice Exaro News
- Edwards, Peter (February 1, 2019). "Realtor's Murder Smells Like a Power Play". The Toronto Star. Archived from the original on 2019-02-02.
- Taekema, Dan; (1 March 2019) City Ordered to Pay Former Undercover Cop $20K CBC News
- Fairbanks, Phil; (30 April 2019) A Canadian Murder. 'Buffalo's Crime Family.' Is the Mafia Still Around? The Buffalo News
- Humphreys, Adrian (19 September 2019) Hamilton Police Ignored Court Orders, Brought Justice into Disrepute National Post
- Taekema, Dan; (19 September 2019) City Loses right to Defend Itself in Lawsuit Brought by Former Undercover Cop CBC News
- Specht, Charlie; (17 December 2019) Is Strip Club raid a sign of Buffalo Mafia resurgence 7 Eyewtiness News
- Pazzano, Sam; (4 March 2020) Trademark Killing Sends Message Toronto Sun
- Edwards, Peter (April 8, 2020). "How Covid 19 is changing Organized Crime in the GTA". Toronto Star. Archived from the original on 2020-04-10.
- Collman, Ashley; (25 June 2020) 3 Cops watched a fellow officer slowly kill George Floyd Business Insider
- Edwards, Peter (July 10, 2020). "Hamilton Mobster Pat Musitano Shot Dead in Burlington". The Toronto Star. Archived from the original on 2020-07-11.
- Humphreys, Adrian; (12 July 2020) Murdered Mob Boss Pat Musitano Symbolized Ontarios Mafia With His Gangster Chic The National Post
- Yuen, Jenny; (9 January 2021) Whistle Blower Claims Haltons Top Cop in Florida Helping Girlfriend Sell Home The Toronto Sun
