= Wayne Gates =

Canadian politician

Wayne Gates MPP
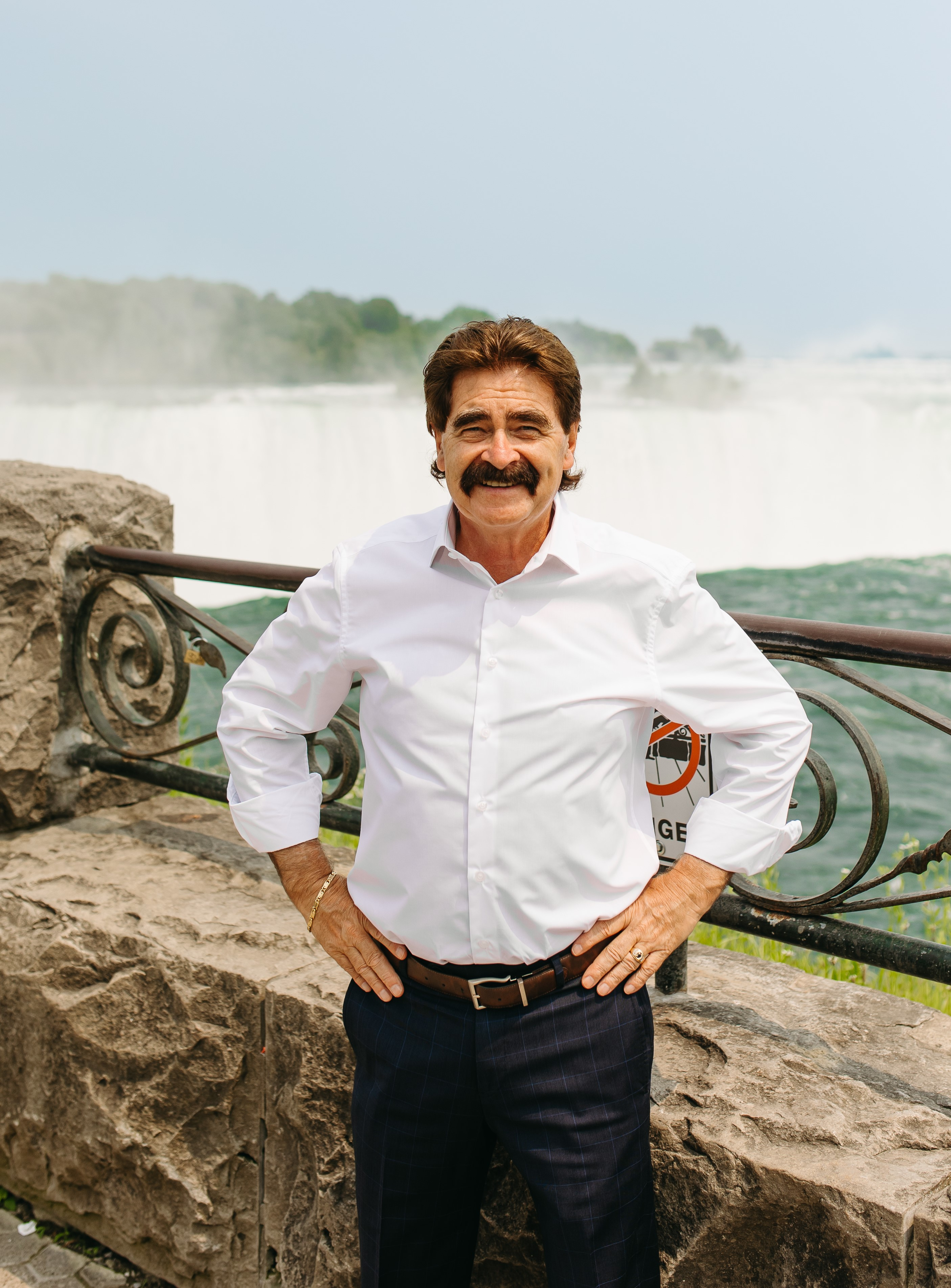

Opposition Critic for Long-Term Care, Retirement Homes and Home Care
- Incumbent
- Assumed office July 13, 2022
- Leader: Andrea Horwath; Peter Tabuns (interim)

Member of the Ontario Provincial Parliament for Niagara Falls
- Incumbent
- Assumed office February 13, 2014
- Preceded by: Kim Craitor

Personal details
- Party: New Democratic

Wayne J. Gates MPP is a Canadian politician who has represented Niagara Falls in the Legislative Assembly of Ontario since 2014. A member of the Ontario New Democratic Party (NDP), he was elected in a February 2014 by-election and has been re-elected in each subsequent general election.

== Background ==
Prior to entering provincial politics, Gates was a city councillor for the City of Niagara Falls, and president of a Unifor local in Niagara Falls, Ontario. He also served as the campaign chair for the United Way, was a member the Yellow Shirt Brigade to save the Fort Erie hospital, member of the city's recreation committee, Project Share volunteer, and member of the Ontario Health Coalition.

== Political career ==
Gates ran as the federal New Democratic Party's candidate in Niagara Falls in the 2004 federal election and the 2006 federal election finishing third both times.

He was elected as a city councillor in Niagara Falls, Ontario in 2010. In February 2014, he was elected in a provincial by-election in the riding of Niagara Falls. He defeated Progressive Conservative candidate Bart Maves by 962 votes. He was re-elected in the 2014 provincial election defeating PC candidate Bart Maves by 7,429 votes. Gates is the only New Democrat in history to be re-elected in the Niagara Falls riding and holds the record for the highest vote tally of any candidate ever in the Niagara Falls provincial riding, at 24,131 votes. He surpassed that record in 2018 by winning 30,161 votes.

Gates has served in several critic portfolio roles as part of the Ontario NDP caucus, including Transportation, Economic Development, workers' health and safety and Consumer Services. He is currently one of the Official Opposition's critics for Long-Term Care, Retirement Homes and Home Care.

In 2016, he scored a major victory by winning unanimous support for his motion to address lengthy wait times for MRI services in Niagara. He continues to advocate for healthcare issues, is a major proponent for the building of the New Niagara Falls Hospital, and has tabled legislation for universal coverage for PSA testing and the creation of a direct caregiver benefit payment in Ontario.

== Electoral record ==
2025 Ontario general election: Niagara Falls
Party	Candidate	Votes	%	±%	Expenditures
New Democratic	Wayne Gates	29,549	54.95	+6.87	$134,315
Progressive Conservative	Ruth-Ann Nieuwesteeg	18,569	34.53	–1.90	$143,643
Liberal	Shafoli Kapur	3,398	6.32	–2.10	$25,619
New Blue	Gary Dumelie	870	1.62	–1.18	$1,512
Green	Celia Taylor	837	1.56	–1.14	$0
Ontario Party	Andrew Soifert	285	0.53	–0.77	$0
Independent	Joedy Burdett	263	0.49	–	$0
Total valid votes/expense limit		53,771	99.18	–	$193,910
Total rejected, unmarked and declined ballots		444	0.82	+0.21	
Turnout		54,215	45.01	+1.41	
Eligible voters		120,441			
New Democratic hold		Swing		+4.39	
Source: Elections Ontario

2022 Ontario general election: Niagara Falls
Party	Candidate	Votes	%	±%	Expenditures
New Democratic	Wayne Gates	24,207	48.08	–2.71	$139,224
Progressive Conservative	Bob Gale	18,342	36.43	+0.86	$75,328
Liberal	Ashley Waters	4,239	8.42	–0.93	$13,483
New Blue	Christine Lewis-Napolitano	1,409	2.80	–	$3,184
Green	Tommy Ward	1,356	2.69	–0.77	$401
Ontario Party	Wesley Kavanagh	656	1.30	–	none listed
None of the Above	Devon St. Denis-Richard	135	0.27	–	$0
Total valid votes/expense limit		50,344	99.39		
Total rejected, unmarked and declined ballots		309	0.61	–0.47	
Turnout		50,653	43.60	–10.96	
Eligible voters		116,171			
New Democratic hold		Swing		–1.78	
Source: Elections Ontario

2018 Ontario general election: Niagara Falls
Party	Candidate	Votes	%	±%
New Democratic	Wayne Gates	30,161	50.79	+3.40
Progressive Conservative	Chuck McShane	21,126	35.58	+2.76
Liberal	Dean Demizio	5,554	9.95	−5.06
Green	Karen Fraser	2,057	3.46	+0.03
Libertarian	Shaun Somers	314	0.53	−0.54
Moderate	Goran Zubic	169	0.28	
Total valid votes		59,381	100.0	
Source: Elections Ontario

2014 Ontario general election: Niagara Falls
Party	Candidate	Votes	%	±%
New Democratic	Wayne Gates	24,123	47.38	+7.84
Progressive Conservative	Bart Maves	16,699	32.80	-3.96
Liberal	Lionel Tupman	7,314	14.36	-5.00
Green	Clarke Bitter	1,724	3.39	+0.65
Libertarian	Ralph Panucci	560	1.10	+0.67
None of the Above	John Ringo Beam	498	0.98	
Total valid votes		50,918	100.0	
New Democratic hold		Swing		+5.90
Source: Elections Ontario

Ontario provincial by-election, February 13, 2014: Niagara Falls Resignation of Kim Craitor
Party	Candidate	Votes	%	±%
New Democratic	Wayne Gates	14,526	39.44	+13.14
Progressive Conservative	Bart Maves	13,564	36.83	+2.00
Liberal	Joyce Morocco	7,143	19.39	-16.50
Green	Clarke Bitter	1,006	2.73	+1.11
Independent	Tim Tredwell	224	0.61	+0.24
Libertarian	Stefanos Karatopis	159	0.43	-0.03
People's Political Party	Troy Young	108	0.29	
Freedom	Andrew Brannan	102	0.28	
Total valid votes		36,832		
Turnout				
NDP gain from Liberal		Swing	+14.82%	

2006 Canadian federal election: Niagara Falls
Party	Candidate	Votes	%	±%
Conservative	Rob Nicholson	23,489	40.4	+1.7
Liberal	Gary Burroughs	20,099	34.5	-2.0
New Democratic	Wayne Gates	12,214	21.0	+0.2
Green	Kay Green	2,402	4.1	+0.1
Total valid votes		58,204	100.0	

2004 Canadian federal election: Niagara Falls
Party	Candidate	Votes	%	±%
Conservative	Rob Nicholson	19,882	38.7	-7.7
Liberal	Victor Pietrangelo	18,745	36.5	-9.4
New Democratic	Wayne Gates	10,680	20.8	+14.7
Green	Ted Mousseau	2,071	4.0	+2.7
Total valid votes		51,378	100.0	
