= George Musgrove (politician) =

Canadian politician (1865–1954)

George J. Musgrove

MPP for Niagara Falls
- In office June 29, 1914 – September 23, 1919
- Preceded by: first member
- Succeeded by: Charles Swayze

Personal details
- Born: September 11, 1865 Huron County, Canada West
- Died: September 23, 1954 (aged 89) Guelph, Ontario
- Party: Conservative

George Johnston Musgrove (September 11, 1865 – September 23, 1954) was a dentist and political figure in Ontario. He represented Niagara Falls in the Legislative Assembly of Ontario from 1914 to 1919 as a Conservative member.

He was the son of John Musgrove and Mary A. Armstrong, both natives of Ireland, and was educated at the Clinton Collegiate Institute. From the age of 18 to 23, he taught school. In 1893, Musgrove married Jenny Small. Dr. George J. Musgrove died in 1954 at Guelph and was buried at Fairview Cemetery in Niagara Falls.

His brother Armstrong also served in the assembly.
