= Ted Salci =

Canadian politician

22nd Mayor of Niagara Falls
- In office December 1, 2003 – November 30, 2010
- Preceded by: Wayne Thomson
- Succeeded by: Jim Diodati

Personal details
- Party: Independent
- Occupation: Politician

Ted Salci (pronounced [ˈsaltʃi]) is a retired Canadian politician who served as the 22nd mayor of Niagara Falls from 2003 to 2010. He was elected in 2003, defeating Wayne Thomson, for whom Salci once acted as campaign chair. He was re-elected in 2006.

During the 2010 municipal election, Salci failed to secure a third term as mayor, losing to Jim Diodati.

Salci ran in the 1981 provincial election and the 1985 provincial election, as a candidate for the Ontario Progressive Conservative Party. In both elections he was defeated by Vince Kerrio.

Salci was a real estate agent and businessman before entering politics.

He was appointed as a Citizenship Judge in December 2011.
