= William Gore Willson =

Canadian politician

MPP for Niagara Falls
- In office 1923–1934
- Preceded by: Charles Swayze
- Succeeded by: William Houck

Personal details
- Born: November 4, 1882 Ridgeway, Ontario
- Died: January 24, 1953 (aged 70) Fort Erie, Ontario
- Party: Conservative

William Gore Willson (November 4, 1882 – January 24, 1953) was a Canadian politician. He represented Niagara Falls in the Legislative Assembly of Ontario from 1923 to 1934 as a member of the Conservative Party. He died of a heart attack in 1953.
