= Walter Sendzik =

Canadian politician

Mayor of St. Catharines
- In office December 1, 2014 – November 15, 2022
- Preceded by: Brian McMullan
- Succeeded by: Mat Siscoe

Personal details
- Born: February 28, 1972 (age 54) St. Catharines, Ontario, Canada
- Spouse: Melanie Sendzik
- Children: 2
- Education: McGill University; Wilfrid Laurier University
- Occupation: Politician; publisher

Walter Sendzik (born February 28, 1972) is a Canadian politician who served as the mayor of St. Catharines from 2014 to 2022. As mayor, he sat on Niagara Regional Council. Sendzik did not run for a third term in the 2022 Niagara Region municipal elections, and was succeeded as mayor by Mat Siscoe.

== Career ==
Prior to being elected, Sendzik was the general manager of the Greater Niagara Chamber of Commerce. He had been with the Chamber of Commerce for seven years. Prior to this, he founded Vines Publishing, a publishing company specializing in wine and travel, including Vines magazine. He sold the company in 2005. He also served as president of the Niagara Wine Festival. He holds a B.A. from Wilfrid Laurier University and a master's degree from McGill University.

Sendzik was first elected as mayor in 2014 on a platform of youth retention, employment diversification, and attracting well paying jobs. The position was an open one with the previous mayor, Brian McMullan retiring. Sendzik defeated future NDP MPP Jeff Burch, winning 40% of the vote to Burch's 35%. In his first term as mayor, the city prepared for the construction of a 19-storey condominium building, the first of its kind in the city, part of the city's transition into both a bedroom community and the "urban centre" of the Niagara Region.

He was re-elected in 2018 running on a record of economic development and investing in infrastructure. He was re-elected, winning 72% of the vote. After being re-elected, one issue Sendzik had to deal with were the layoffs at General Motors, one of the largest private sector employers in the city. Also during his second term, St. Catharines experienced a housing boom after increased GO Train connections to the Greater Toronto Area.

== Electoral record ==
2018 St. Catharine's mayoral election
Candidate	Votes	%
Walter Sendzik	21,574	71.85
Richard Stephens	5,834	19.43
Johnny Tischler	1,465	4.88
Tunde Soniregun	1,154	3.84

2014 St. Catharine's mayoral election
Candidate	Votes	%
Walter Sendzik	13,147	40.19
Jeff Burch	11,321	34.61
Peter Secord	6,571	20.09
Mark Stevens	1,135	3.47
Jim Fannon	535	1.64
