= Jeff Burch =

Canadian politician

Jeff Burch MPP
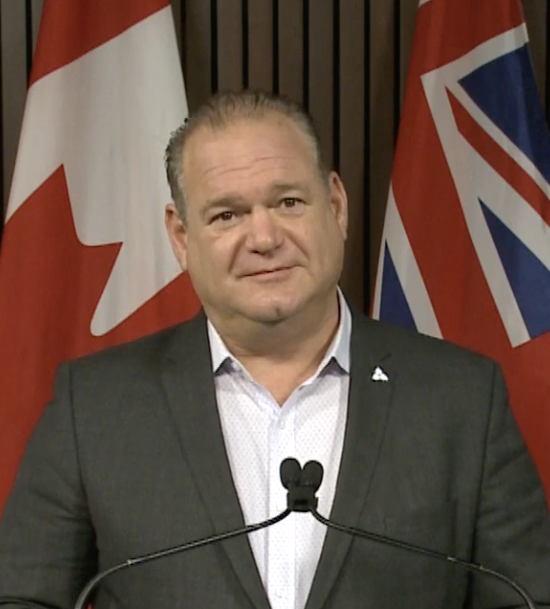
- Burch in 2020

Caucus Chair of the Ontario New Democratic Party
- Incumbent
- Assumed office July 13, 2022
- Leader: Peter Tabuns (interim) Marit Stiles

Critic, Municipal Affairs
- Incumbent
- Assumed office September 6, 2018
- Leader: Andrea Horwath Peter Tabuns (interim) Marit Stiles

Member of the Ontario Provincial Parliament for Niagara Centre
- Incumbent
- Assumed office June 7, 2018
- Preceded by: Cindy Forster

Personal details
- Party: New Democratic
- Education: Brock University
- Occupation: Non profit executive director / CEO, President of Steel Workers Union

Jeff Burch is a Canadian politician, who was elected to the Legislative Assembly of Ontario in the 2018 provincial election. He represents the electoral district of Niagara Centre as a member of the Ontario New Democratic Party.

Prior to his election to the legislature Burch was the executive director of Niagara Folk Arts, a non–profit social services agency, and served as city councillor for Merritton Ward for St. Catharines City Council.

== Background ==
Jeff Burch is a graduate from Brock University, with an honours BA in philosophy. Burch then spent three years as a graduate student and teaching assistant at Brock, teaching seminars in social issues and women's studies. He left his studies in 1996 after being elected president of a United Steelworkers local union.

== Politics ==
Burch ran as the Ontario New Democratic Party's candidate in St. Catharines in 1995, losing to Liberal Jim Bradley. He was elected as a city councillor in St. Catharines, Ontario, in 2006. He served from 2006 to 2014, including four years as budget chair. He ran for mayor of St. Catharines in 2014, losing to Walter Sendzik by fewer than 2000 votes.

In February 2018, Burch won the NDP nomination in Niagara Centre. The riding has been an NDP stronghold for 44 years with Mel Swart, Peter Kormos and Cindy Forster holding the seat. On June 7, 2018, Burch won the seat. Burch currently serves as the Official Opposition critic for Municipal Affairs as well as the chair of the Official Opposition caucus.

Three months after his election in 2018, he scored a major victory by winning unanimous support for his motion to bring two-way all-day GO Transit rail service to Niagara.

== Electoral record ==
2025 Ontario general election: Niagara Centre
Party	Candidate	Votes	%	±%	Expenditures
New Democratic	Jeff Burch	20,408	42.29	+2.59	$92,494
Progressive Conservative	Bill Steele	18,073	37.27	–0.36	$92,858
Liberal	Damien O'Brien	7,143	14.74	+1.41	$5,551
Green	Natashia Bergen	1,261	2.60	–1.93	$0
New Blue	Jimmy Jackson	857	1.77	–0.97	$1,667
Ontario Party	Darryl Weinberg	513	1.06	–0.97	
Ontario Alliance	Angela Browne	130	0.27	N/A	
Total valid votes/expense limit		48,483	99.28	–0.25	$162,196
Total rejected, unmarked, and declined ballots		353	0.72	+0.25	
Turnout		48,836	49.59	+6.22	
Eligible voters		98,486			
New Democratic hold		Swing		+1.48	
Source: Elections Ontario

2022 Ontario general election: Niagara Centre
Party	Candidate	Votes	%	±%	Expenditures
New Democratic	Jeff Burch	16,360	39.70	–4.53	$98,721
Progressive Conservative	Fred Davies	15,506	37.63	+0.12	$60,037
Liberal	Terry Flynn	5,492	13.33	+1.50	$12,584
Green	Michelle McArthur	1,865	4.53	+0.84	$6
New Blue	Gary Dumelie	1,148	2.79	N/A	$1,586
Ontario Party	Vincent Gircys	837	2.03	N/A	$0
Total valid votes/expense limit		41,208	99.53	+0.90	$133,643
Total rejected, unmarked, and declined ballots		194	0.47	–0.90	
Turnout		41,402	43.37	–12.76	
Eligible voters		95,459			
New Democratic hold		Swing		–2.32	
Source(s): "Summary of Valid Votes Cast for Each Candidate" (PDF). Elections Ontario. 2022. Archived from the original on 2023-05-18.; "Statistical Summary by Electoral District" (PDF). Elections Ontario. 2022. Archived from the original on 2023-05-21.; "Political Financing and Party Information". Elections Ontario.

2018 Ontario general election: Niagara Centre
Party	Candidate	Votes	%	±%
New Democratic	Jeff Burch	21,618	44.23	−3.65
Progressive Conservative	April Jeffs	18,333	37.51	+10.87
Liberal	Benoit Mercier	5,779	11.82	−8.60
Green	Joe Dias	1,803	3.69	−0.34
None of the Above	Joe Crawford	623	1.27	
Libertarian	Patrick Pietruszko	368	0.75	−0.27
Independent	Steve Soos	217	0.44	
People's Political Party	Dario Smagata-Bryan	133	0.27	
Total valid votes		48,874	98.63	
Total rejected, unmarked and declined ballots		680	1.37	
Turnout		49,554	56.13	
Eligible voters		88,287		
New Democratic hold		Swing		-7.26
Source: Elections Ontario

=== 2014 St. Catharines Mayoral Election ===
Mayoral Candidate	Vote	%
Walter Sendzik	13,147	40.19
Jeff Burch	11,321	34.61
Peter Secord	6,571	20.09
Mark Stevens	1,135	3.47
Jim Fannon	535	1.64

=== 2010 St. Catharines City Council Election - Ward 1 - Merriton ===
Candidate	Total votes	% of total vote
Jennie Stevens (X)	2,294	32.96%
Jeff Burch (X)	2,064	29.66%
David Haywood	1,134	16.29%
Garry Robbins	817	11.74%
Sam Sacco	491	7.05%
Cameron Alderdice	160	2.30%
Total valid votes	6,960	100.00

=== 2006 St. Catharines City Council Election - Ward 1 - Meritton ===
Candidate	Total votes	% of total vote
Jeff Burch	2857	33.01%
Jennie Stevens (X)	2849	32.92%
Sheila Morra (X)	2049	23.68%
Robbie Craine	899	10.39%
Total valid votes	6,960	100.00
