= John Clement (Ontario politician) =

Canadian politician

Ontario MPP
- In office 1971–1975
- Preceded by: George Bukator
- Succeeded by: Vince Kerrio
- Constituency: Niagara Falls

Personal details
- Born: John Twining Clement; August 28, 1928; Niagara Falls, Ontario
- Died: June 24, 2014 (aged 85); Niagara Falls, Ontario
- Political party: Progressive Conservative
- Spouse: Carol Ann (Drapkin) Panayi
- Children: 4, including Tony Clement
- Profession: Lawyer

John Twining Clement (August 28, 1928 – June 24, 2014) was a politician in Ontario, Canada. He served in the Legislative Assembly of Ontario as a Progressive Conservative Member of Provincial Parliament from 1971 to 1975 and was in the cabinet of premier Bill Davis.

== Background ==
Clement was born in Niagara Falls, Ontario. He went to Queen's University and later attended Osgoode Hall Law School which he attended at the same time as future premier Bill Davis. Clement married Carol Panayi. He had three children from his first wife and with Carol was the stepfather of former Ontario Minister of Health former federal cabinet minister and former federal leadership candidate Tony Clement.

== Politics ==
Clement's first political involvement was as a Trustee on the Niagara Falls School Board. In the 1971 provincial election, Clement ran as the Progressive Conservative candidate in the riding of Niagara Falls beating Liberal incumbent George Bukator by 1,821 votes. In September 1972 he was named as Minister of Consumer and Commercial Relations.

In January 1975, he was named as Attorney General and Provincial Secretary for Justice. In February 1975, he was also appointed Solicitor General when George Kerr resigned from cabinet due to an election donation scandal.

In the 1975 election he was defeated by Liberal Vince Kerrio by 168 votes. Clement called for a recount and a margin of 172 was confirmed.

=== Cabinet posts ===
Ontario provincial government of Bill Davis
Cabinet posts (3)
Predecessor	Office	Successor
George Kerr	Solicitor General; 1975 (February–September)	John MacBeth
Bob Welch	Attorney General; 1975 (January–September); Also Provincial Secretary for Justice	Roy McMurtry
Eric Winkler	Minister of Consumer and Commercial Relations; 1972–1975	Sid Handleman

== Later life ==
Clement was known as an excellent public speaker and often served as Master of Ceremonies at a number of public events—both political and charitable. Over the years he served on the boards of a number of charitable organizations including the Ontario branch of the Canadian Red Cross.

In 1979, Clement was hired by Metro Trans-Public Advertising Ltd., a company that wanted to supply advertising for the Toronto Transit Commission. Later that same year he was appointed to the Toronto Police Services Board to study ways to increase minority hiring on the police force.

In 1983, Clement was a director for Crown Trust and Greymac Trust, two of seven Canadian financial institutions that collapsed that year, having made increasingly bad loans into a highly speculative real estate market during a period of rising inflation and interest rates. He was found not to have been involved and was cleared of wrongdoing. The Ontario government seized the Crown and Greymac assets to protect the depositors. This cost the government $1.2 billion ($3.2 billion today).

In 1988, he was named to the Public Service Staff Relations Board, a committee that adjudicates disputes between the Federal government and its employees.

An accomplished acrobatic pilot, Clement made a trans-atlantic flight in a specially-outfitted Cessna and he served as the President of the St. Catharines Flying Club.
