= Mat Siscoe =

Canadian politician

His Worship Mat Siscoe
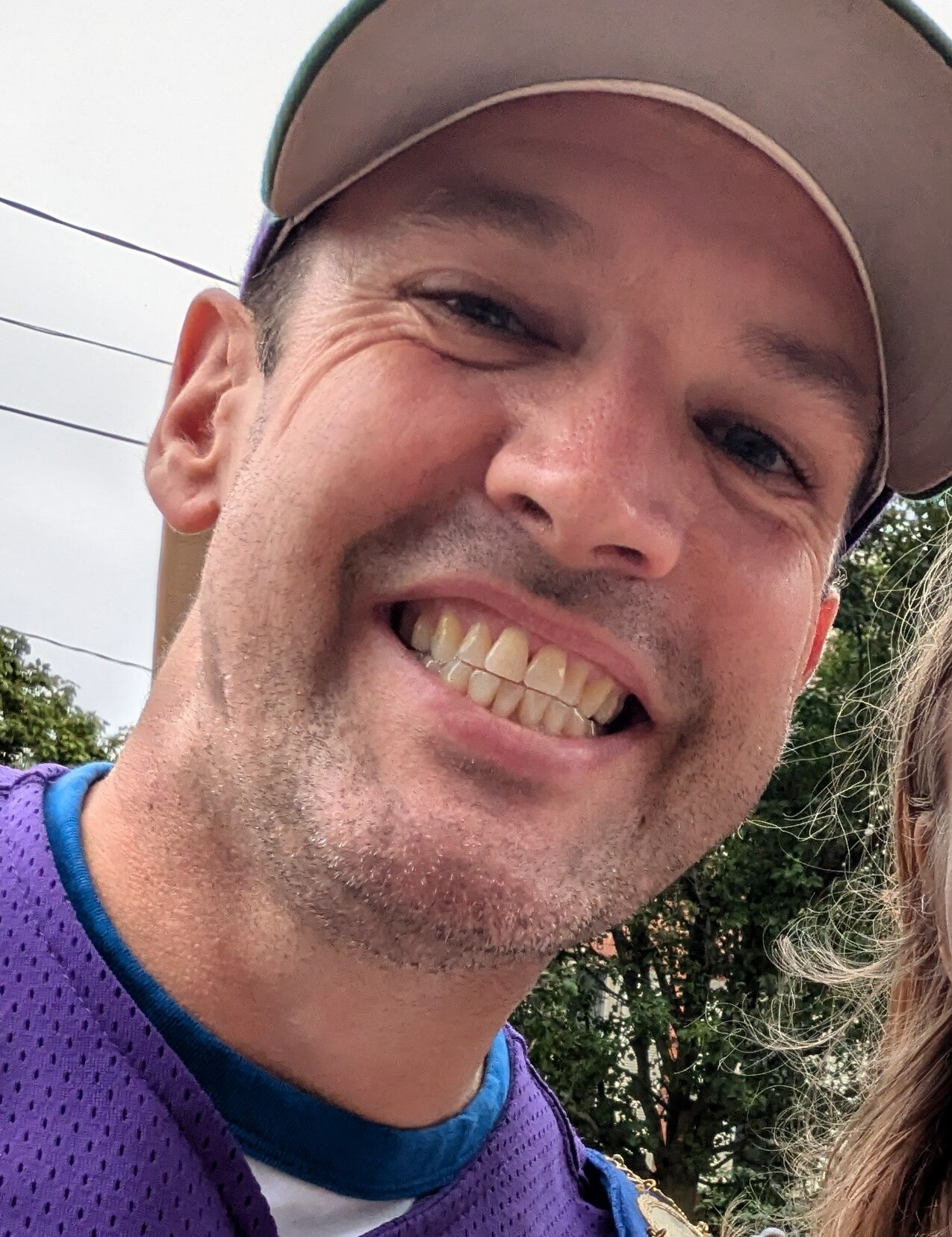
- Siscoe in 2024

Mayor of St. Catharines
- Incumbent
- Assumed office November 15, 2022
- Preceded by: Walter Sendzik

Personal details
- Occupation: Politician
- Website: Mayor's office

Mathew Siscoe is a Canadian politician who is the current mayor of St. Catharines, Ontario.

== Career ==
Mat Siscoe was elected as a city councillor for St. Catharines in 2010 and served three terms. He then filled a vacant seat on the Niagara Regional Council. He ran for St. Catharines as a Progressive Conservative (PC) in the 2014 Ontario general election but his candidacy was unsuccessful.

In 2022, Siscoe won the mayoral election with 17,808 votes, succeeding Walter Sendzik in the role. Siscoe quit his teaching job at St. Paul Catholic High School when he was elected. In 2024, he used his power under the Strong Mayors, Building Homes Act to hasten housing applications.

In August of 2026, Siscoe declared a state of emergency in St. Catharines as a result of heavy rainfall and flooding. Flooding in the Niagara Region resulted in CAD 360 million in damage.
