= Charles Swayze =

Canadian politician (1869–1954)

Charles Fletcher Swayze

MPP for Niagara Falls
- In office 1919–1923
- Preceded by: George Musgrove
- Succeeded by: William Willson

Mayor of Niagara Falls
- In office 1929–1934
- Preceded by: Harry Stephens
- Succeeded by: Charles Anderson

Personal details
- Born: December 26, 1869 Fenwick, Ontario, Canada
- Died: October 10, 1954 (aged 84) Toronto, Ontario, Canada
- Party: Labour

Charles Fletcher Swayze (December 26, 1869 – October 10, 1954) was a Canadian politician. He represented Niagara Falls in the Legislative Assembly of Ontario from 1919 to 1923 as a member of the Labour Party, and subsequently served as mayor of Niagara Falls from 1929 to 1934. He died in 1954.
