= William Houck =

Canadian politician

Member of the Canadian Parliament for Niagara Falls
- In office 1953–1960
- Preceded by: District established (1952)
- Succeeded by: Judy LaMarsh

Member of the Legislative Assembly of Ontario for Niagara Falls
- In office 1934–1943
- Preceded by: William Gore Willson
- Succeeded by: Cyril Overall
- In office 1948–1953
- Preceded by: Carl Hanniwell
- Succeeded by: Arthur Jolley

Personal details
- Born: William Limburg Houck; May 10, 1893 Buffalo, New York, U.S.
- Died: May 5, 1960 (aged 66)
- Party: Liberal
- Other political affiliations: Ontario Liberal
- Cabinet: Provincial: Minister Without Portfolio (1937-1943)

William Limburg Houck (May 10, 1893 – May 5, 1960) was a Canadian politician.

Born in Buffalo, New York, Houck was a coal dealer, fuel dealer, and merchant before being elected as the Liberal Party of Ontario candidate to the Legislative Assembly of Ontario in 1934, 1937, 1948, and 1951. Houck was Minister without Portfolio in the provincial cabinet from 1937 to 1943. He also served as mayor of Niagara Falls, Ontario from 1947 to 1950.

Houck was the Liberal candidate elected to the House of Commons of Canada from the riding of Niagara Falls in 1953, 1957, and 1958 elections. He served until his death in 1960.
