= Wayne Thomson =

Canadian politician

20th Mayor of Niagara Falls
- In office 1978–1983
- Preceded by: George Bukator
- Succeeded by: Bill Smeaton
- In office 1991 – November 30, 2003
- Preceded by: Bill Smeaton
- Succeeded by: Ted Salci

Personal details
- Born: September 24, 1939 (age 86) Niagara Falls, Ontario, Canada
- Party: Independent
- Children: 3
- Occupation: Politician

Wayne Thomson (born September 24, 1939) is a Canadian politician who served as the mayor of Niagara Falls from 1978 to 1983 and from 1991 to 2003. He also served as an alderman from 1968 to 1978 and as a city councillor from 2010 to 2024.

== Background ==
Thomson was born September 24, 1939, in Niagara Falls, Ontario. His father was a firefighter who would go on to serve as the city's fire chief. He attended Maple Street School and Niagara Falls Collegiate. He earned a diploma in public health inspection from Ryerson University. Prior to entering politics, he worked as a public health inspector.

== Political career ==
Thomson was elected an alderman in Niagara Falls in the 1968 municipal election. While on the city council, he chaired the United Way campaign, sat on the Social Planning council, and served on the board of a retirement home.

Thomson was elected mayor in 1978, defeating incumbent mayor George Bukator. He was re-elected in 1980, defeating Bukator a second time, and was re-elected to a third term in 1982, defeating Bukator once again.

In 1983, Thomson was caught up in two controversies in quick succession. In the spring of 1983, he attended a convention in Lucerne, Switzerland. While there, he accepted a free vacation for November of that year from another attendee, Rudy Baur, a Swiss developer who was president of a Toronto-based development firm with major holdings in Niagara Falls. He cancelled the vacation shortly after the story was published in the Niagara Falls Review.

Shortly afterwards, the Niagara Falls Review published another story about a land purchase made by Thomson's then-fiancée Bonnie Dickson. His fiancée bought some land in Niagara Falls from a seller who did not want it to be sold to Marineland. Seven months later, she sold the plot to Marineland. Marineland owner John Holer stated she acted as trustee and was accompanied by Thomson when the arrangements were made. Thomson apologized for being "naive" and suggested the city council launch an investigation into the land deal.

However, any plans to launch an investigation were dropped when Thomson abruptly resigned as mayor in December 1983. He denied that his resignation was related to the controversies. Instead, he said he was resigning to retain his position as a health inspector at the local health department, from which he had taken a leave of absence while mayor. The province had transferred jurisdiction of the health unit to the Niagara Region, effective January 1, 1984, and provincial regulations prohibited him from holding elected office as a regional employee.

In 1991, Thomson returned to politics and was re-elected as mayor. On September 1, 1998, he was assaulted in his office by Joe Pietrangelo, a former city worker who was meeting with Thomson to discuss the city's decision to rezone his family property. Pietrangelo drew a metal cane and struck Thomson repeatedly before his assistant was able to intervene. Thomson was left hospitalized and required surgery. Pietrangelo was convicted of attempted murder and sentenced to 25 years in prison. However, in 2008, he was found not criminally responsible due to a mental disorder.

Thomson was defeated by Ted Salci in the 2003 municipal election. He later ran and won election to Niagara Falls City Council as a councillor in the 2010 municipal election. He stepped down in September 2024.

== Personal life ==
Thomson married Bonnie Dickson in October 1983. He has three daughters from a previous marriage.

== Awards and recognition ==
In October 2024, the city of Niagara Falls awarded Thomson the Key to the City.
