= Cyril Overall =

Canadian politician

MPP for Niagara Falls
- In office 1943–1945

Personal details
- Born: Cyril Arthur Goodwin Overall; May 7, 1905 Walthamstow, Essex, England
- Died: February 23, 1970 (aged 64) Lakewood, Ohio, U.S.
- Party: Co-operative Commonwealth

Cyril Arthur Goodwin Overall (May 7, 1905 – December 23, 1970) was an English-born mechanical engineer and political figure in Ontario. He represented Niagara Falls in the Legislative Assembly of Ontario from 1943 to 1945 as a Co-operative Commonwealth member.

He was born in Walthamstow, Essex, the son of William Joseph Overall and Annie Sophia Walker, and came to Canada in 1906 with his family. Overall was educated in Stamford and Niagara Falls, at the Tri-State College of Engineering in Angola, Indiana and at the Ontario Training College for Technical Teachers in Hamilton. In 1935, he married Mary Hood Ritchie. For a time, Overall was a vocational high school teacher in Niagara Falls before returning to work as an engineer. He defeated William Houck in 1943 to win his seat in the assembly.

He died at Lakewood, Ohio on December 23, 1970.
