= Bart Maves =

Canadian politician

Niagara Regional Councillor
- Incumbent
- Assumed office 2010
- Constituency: Niagara Falls (Note: Maves sits as one of three councillors representing the City of Niagara Falls along with Barbara Greenwood and Selina Volpatti.)

Member of the Ontario Provincial Parliament for Niagara Falls
- In office 1995–2003
- Preceded by: Margaret Harrington
- Succeeded by: Kim Craitor

Personal details
- Born: October 30, 1964 (age 61) Niagara Falls, Ontario
- Party: Progressive Conservative
- Profession: Civil servant

Bart Maves (born October 30, 1964) is a politician in Ontario, Canada. He was a Progressive Conservative member of the Legislative Assembly of Ontario from 1995 to 2003. In 2010, he was elected as a Regional Councillor representing Niagara Falls for the Niagara Regional Council.

== Background ==
Maves worked as a legislative assistant to federal MP Ken Atkinson, who represented St. Catharines from 1988 to 1993. He also worked as a planning secretariat for Alberta's Education ministry. Maves is a nephew of W. Bart Maves who was elected to as a Niagara Falls City Councillor in 2006 and re-elected in 2010.

== Politics ==
=== Provincial ===
Maves was elected to the Ontario legislature in the provincial election of 1995, defeating Liberal Marg Germano and incumbent New Democrat Margaret Harrington in the riding of Niagara Falls. In 1997, he was appointed as the parliamentary assistant to the Minister of Labour.

In the provincial election of 1999, Maves was re-elected by about 1,500 votes over Liberal candidate Selina Volpatti. He held other parliamentary assistant positions in the parliament which followed, but was not appointed to cabinet. In 2002, he supported Jim Flaherty's unsuccessful bid to replace Mike Harris as party leader.

In the 2003 provincial election, Maves lost to Liberal Kim Craitor by over 3,000 votes. He was the Progressive Conservative Party of Ontario's candidate for the Niagara Falls riding again in the 2007 provincial election but lost again to Craitor.

He tried to regain the seat in a February 2014 by-election after Craitor retired but lost to NDP candidate Wayne Gates by 1,025 votes. He was defeated once again by Gates in the 2014 provincial election, this time by 7,429 votes.

=== Regional ===
In the 2010 municipal election, Maves ran for and was elected as one of the three regional councillors representing Niagara Falls on the Niagara Regional Council. Maves topped the polls, winning 13,695 votes, more than any other candidate for any municipal office in Niagara Falls. Elected alongside Maves as a regional councillor was Selina Volpatti, who had been his Liberal opponent during the 1999 provincial general election. Maves attempted to become the chair of the Regional Council. The position is not directly elected but is selected by a runoff ballot process amongst the members of the council. Maves lost to Gary Burroughs by a vote of 19 to 11 on the 4th ballot.
