= Jim Diodati =

Canadian former politician

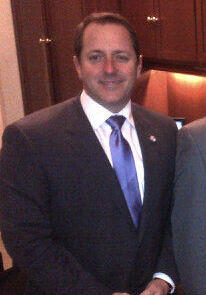
- Diodati in 2013

23rd Mayor of Niagara Falls
- In office December 1, 2010 – November 15, 2026
- Preceded by: Ted Salci
- Succeeded by: Lori Lococo

Personal details
- Born: James Diodati; September 6, 1965 (age 61) Niagara Falls, Ontario, Canada
- Party: Independent
- Spouse: Yvonne Diodati
- Children: 3
- Occupation: Politician

James Diodati (born September 6, 1965) is a Canadian former politician who served as the 23rd mayor of Niagara Falls from December 2010 until November 2026. He was succeeded by Lori Lococo after losing the 2026 Niagara Falls municipal election.

He was first elected in the 2010 municipal election, defeating incumbent mayor Ted Salci. Prior to his election to the mayoralty, Diodati served on the Niagara Falls City Council for two terms, a total of seven years. He is currently serving his third term on the Niagara Regional Council.

Diodati had been self-employed throughout his time serving on the Niagara Falls City Council and while serving as mayor of Niagara Falls. He operates a web-based health and wellness direct marketing business.

Diodati has an extensive volunteer history, including serving on Niagara Catholic District School Board (NCDSB) Accommodation Review Committee and its Vision 20/20 Advisory Committee. He also established the 'Sleep Cheap, Charities Reap' fundraising event, which has raised more than $1.8M for local charities.

He and his wife, Yvonne (Benyo) Diodati have three children.

Before the 2025 United States trade war with Canada and Mexico, Diodati initially expressed some support for Donald Trump, having thought "he'd be an incredible president," after reading The Art of the Deal. He defended Trump at the beginning of his second term, changing heart after "he put us in his sights and made us look like the bad guy."
