= Niagara Falls City Council =

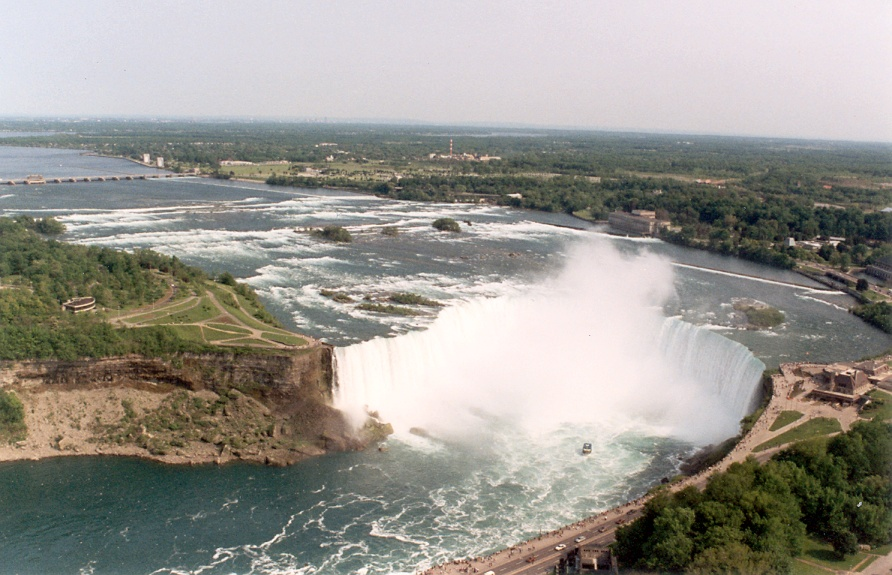
Niagara Falls (viewed from the Canadian side)

Niagara Falls City Council is the governing body of the city of Niagara Falls, Ontario, Canada. The council consists of the mayor plus eight elected councillors representing the city as a whole. The last election was held in 2022, and the next will be held in 2026.

== History ==
Members of city council were originally known as aldermen until 2006, when the terminology was updated to councillor. These councillors were elected through a ward system from 1970 to 2000, which meant that councillors represented local neighbourhoods within the city, as opposed to the city as a whole. However, in 2002, that was changed, so that the top 8 candidates were elected. At the same time, city council voted to reduce the size of the council from 13 to 9 (including the city councillors as well as the mayor).

== Councillors ==
The members of this city council were elected (or reelected) in the 2022 municipal elections

- Mayor Jim Diodati
- Wayne Campbell
- Ruth-Ann Nieuwesteeg
- Tony Baldinelli
- Mona Patel
- Lori Lococo
- Victor Pietrangelo
- Mike Strange
- Wayne Thomson (retired in September 2024 with two years left in his term)
- Chris Dabrowski (appointed after the retirement of Wayne Thomson)

== Controversies ==
=== Thundering Waters ===
In May 2018, Niagara Falls City Council approved the development process of the Riverfront Community and Paradise at Niagara Falls, more commonly known as Thundering Waters. While supporters of the development said that it would bring jobs and tourism to the city, the Niagara Peninsula Conservation Authority as well as other community and environmental groups highlighted the environmental damage it would cause. The development would be situated on significant wetlands, and directly in the watershed of the Welland River. A local environmental scientist filed an appeal with the municipal planning tribunal, which was dismissed. As of March 2021, official site development has not been begun, although the developing company has illegally begun working on the site- clearing trees and disturbing the ecosystem.
