= FirstOntario Concert Hall =

Music and performing arts venue in Hamilton, Ontario, Canada

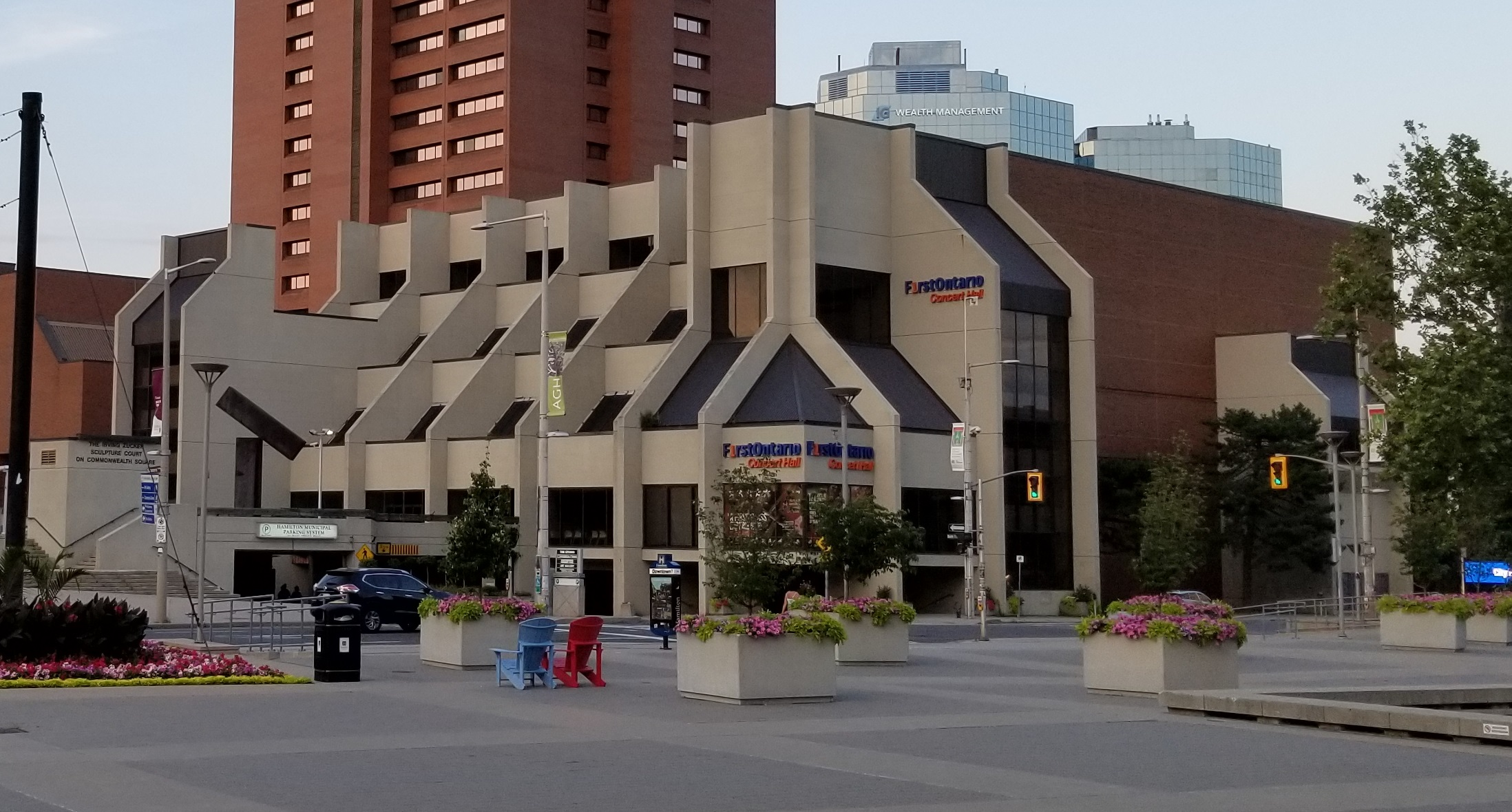
- FirstOntario Concert Hall
- Interactive map of FirstOntario Concert Hall
- Former names: Hamilton Place (1973–1998), Ronald V. Joyce Centre for the Performing Arts at Hamilton Place (1998–2016)
- Address: 1 Summers Lane; Hamilton, Ontario; L8P 4Y2
- Coordinates: 43.2563°N 79.87188°W
- Owner: City of Hamilton
- Operator: Core Entertainment (Comcast Spectacor)
- Capacity: 2,193
- Type: Theatre, Concert Hall

Construction
- Built: 1972; 54 years ago
- Opened: 1973; 53 years ago
- Cost: $11 million
- Architect: Trevor P. Garwood-Jones

Website
- www.coreentertainment.ca/venues/detail/firstontario-concert-hall

FirstOntario Concert Hall is a music and performing arts venue in downtown Hamilton, Ontario, Canada. The venue was originally known as Hamilton Place, and in 1998, became known as the Ronald V. Joyce Centre for the Performing Arts at Hamilton Place after receiving a donation from the Joyce Family Foundation. In 2016, FirstOntario Credit Union made a $2.5 million deal for the naming rights.

The venue is the permanent home of the Hamilton Philharmonic Orchestra and Opera Hamilton.

== Description ==
There are two theatres located within FirstOntario Concert Hall. The main theatre (known as the Great Hall) has two suspended balconies and has a seating capacity of 2,193. The stage is 37.35 m (122.5 ft) wide, and has an adjustable depth from 11.4 m (37 ft) to 16.2 m (53 ft). The Great Hall is recognized internationally for its outstanding acoustics. The smaller theatre is known as The Studio (formerly The Studio at Hamilton Place) and can accommodate up to 350 people. The venue also features rehearsal, break, and dressing rooms, as well as a private courtyard and a large loading dock that is shared with the Hamilton Convention Centre and the Ellen Fairclough Building. FirstOntario Concert Hall is directly connected to the Hamilton Convention Centre via the theatre's main lobby, and shares a common outdoor plaza and sculpture court with the Convention Centre and the Art Gallery of Hamilton known as Commonwealth Square, located above Summers Lane, and accessible via the theatre's mezzanine.

== Performances ==
FirstOntario Concert Hall has hosted musicians and performing artists including Tony Bennett, Leonard Cohen, Morrissey, Chris de Burgh, Sarah McLachlan, Sharon, Lois & Bram, Tangerine Dream, The Proclaimers, Tori Amos, and The Tragically Hip. Comedians Billy Connolly, Margaret Cho and Norm Macdonald have performed at the venue, as well as classic rockers Heart. Theatrical runs have included performances of A Chorus Line, Evita and The Color Purple, in addition to dance-based shows such as Moulin Rouge: The Ballet and Michael Flatley's Lord of the Dance.

== Recordings ==
Several audio and video recordings made at the Hamilton Place Concert Hall have been commercially released:

- Hamilton Philharmonic Virtuosi, Boris Brott – Concerto For Violin & Chamber Orchestra (1976)
- Hamilton Philharmonic Virtuosi, Boris Brott – Petite Suite D'Orchestre (Jeux D'Enfants) / Symphony In Two Movements (1976)
- Split Enz Video LP (Time + Tide Tour) - live concert video (1982)
- Chris de Burgh The Video - live concert video (1983)
- Bill Cosby: Himself - stand-up comedy film (1983)
- Crystal Gayle In Concert - live concert video (1985)
- Ronnie Hawkins: Looking For More Good Times - live concert video (1988)
- Stompin’ Tom in Live Concert - live concert video and album (2005)

== Images ==
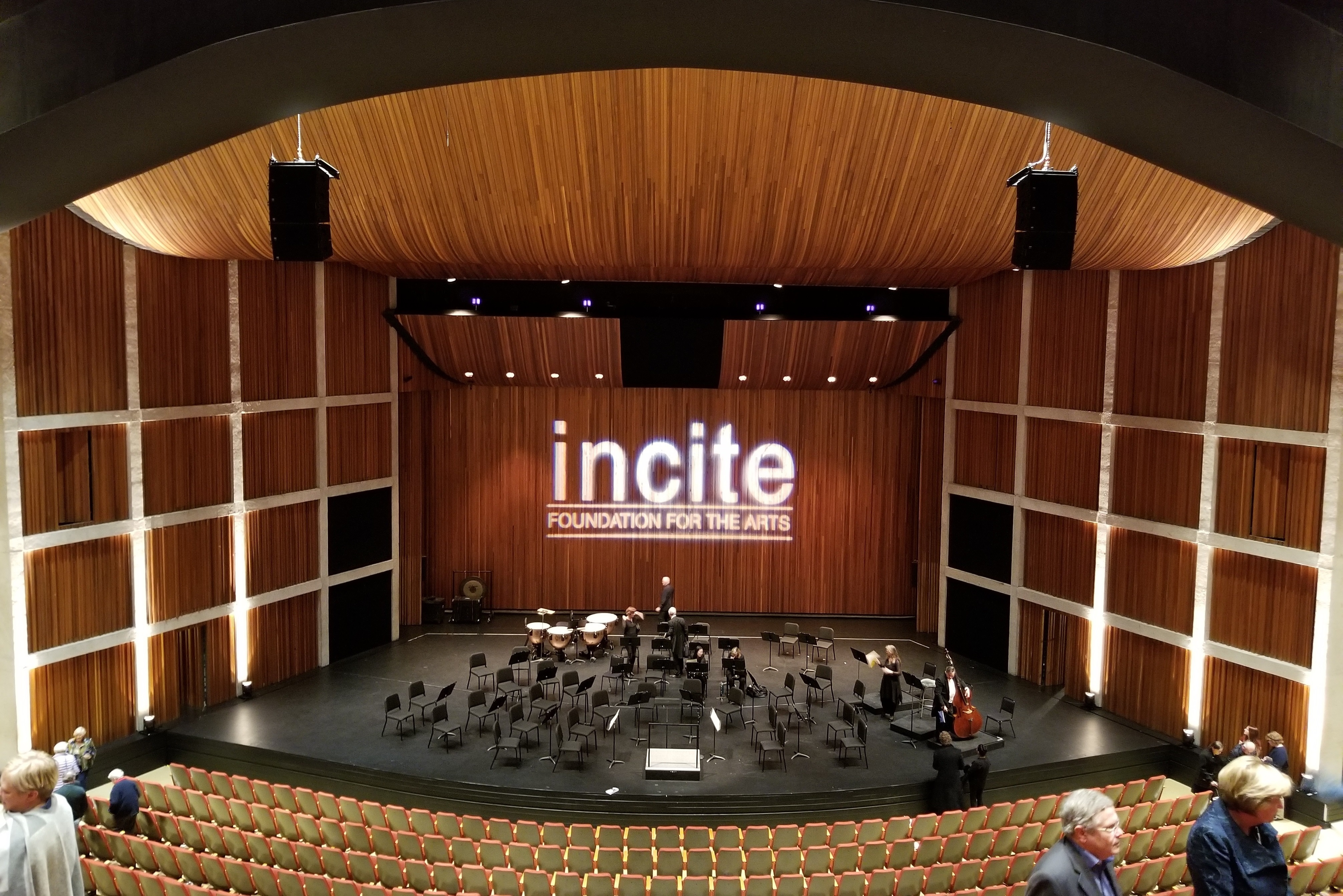
The Great Hall at FirstOntario Concert Hall's stage viewed from the first balcony

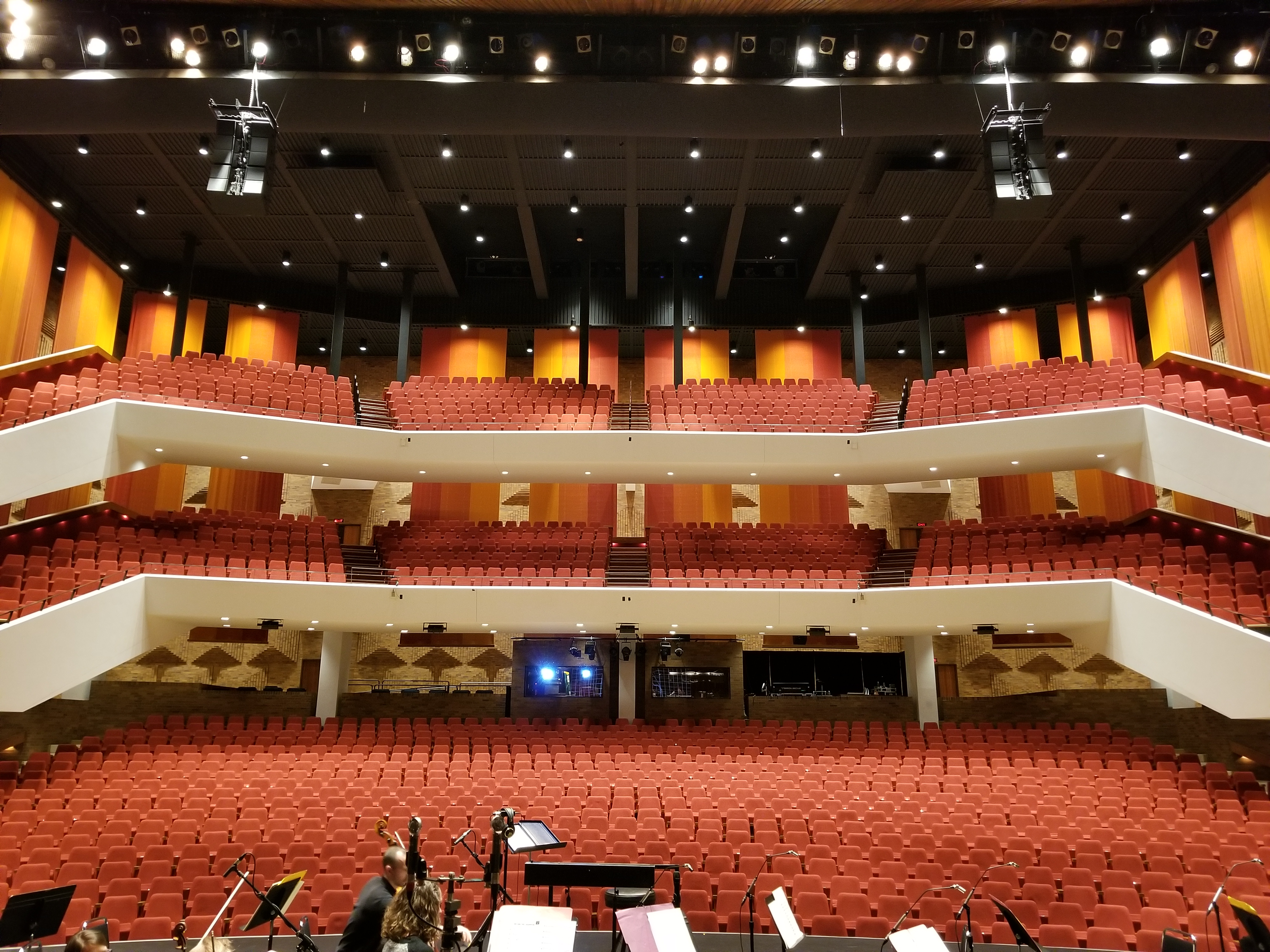
Great Hall at FirstOntario Concert Hall's Seating viewed from the stage

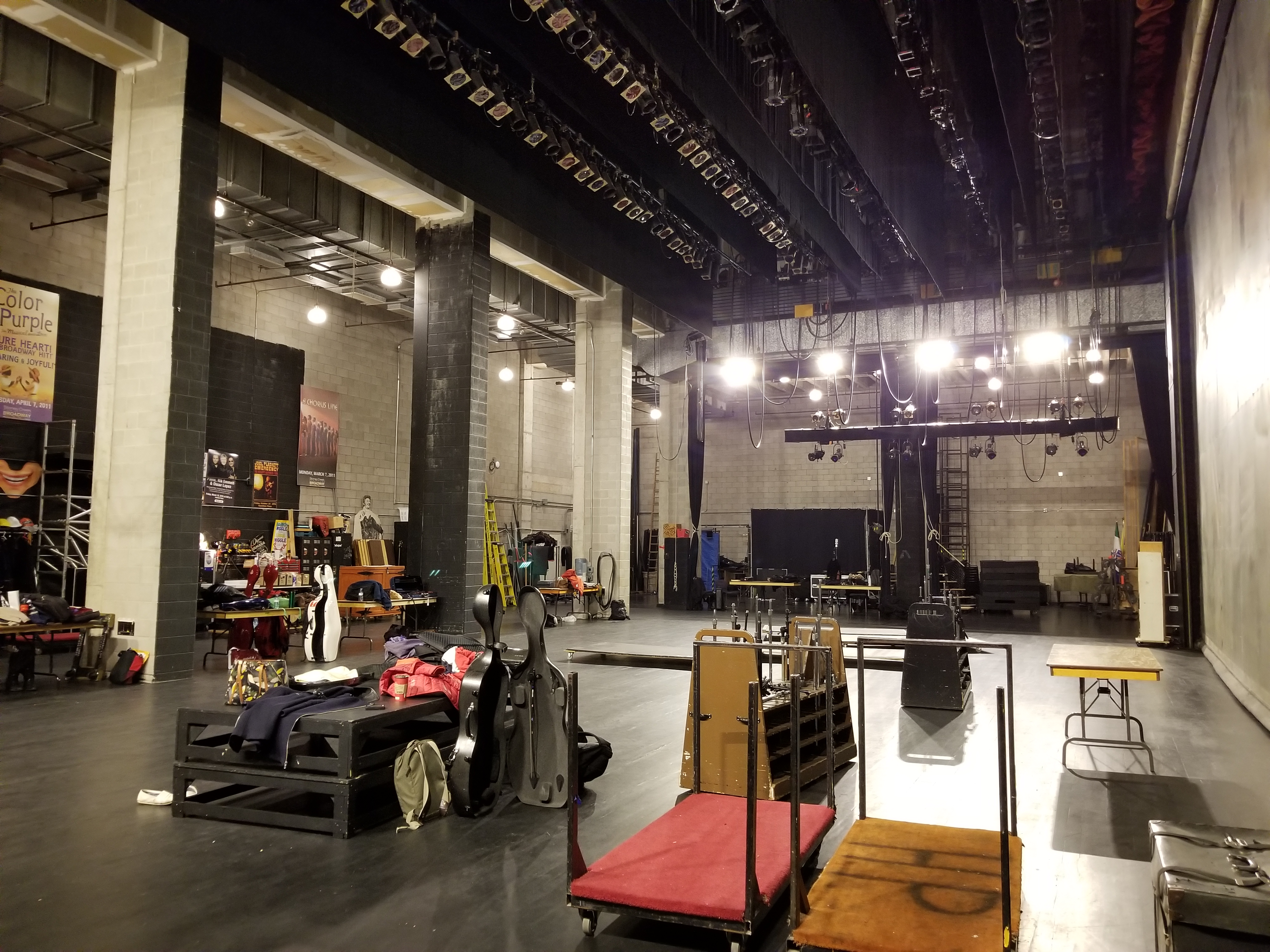
Great Hall at FirstOntario Concert Hall's backstage area

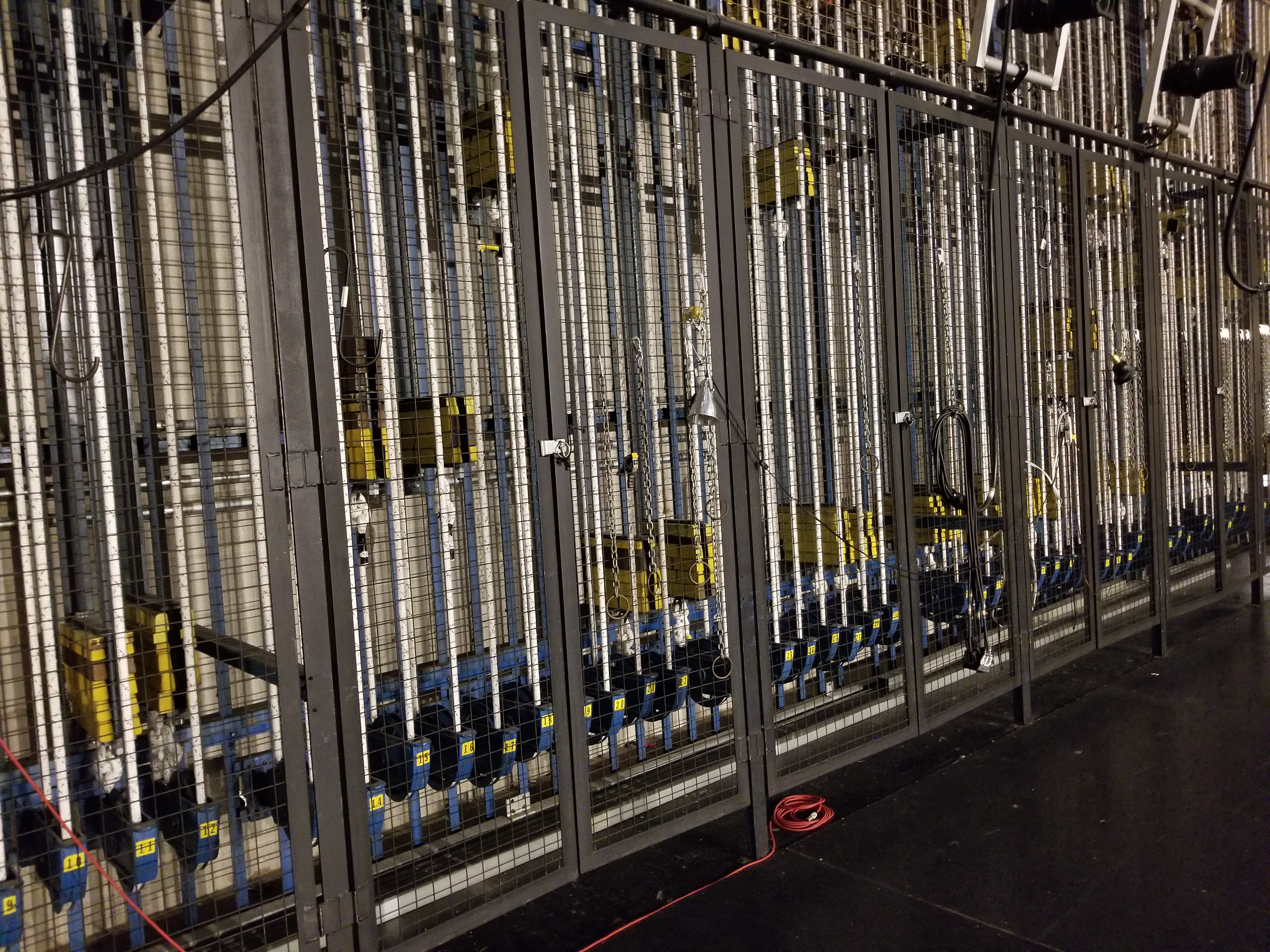
Great Hall at FirstOntario Concert Hall's Fly system

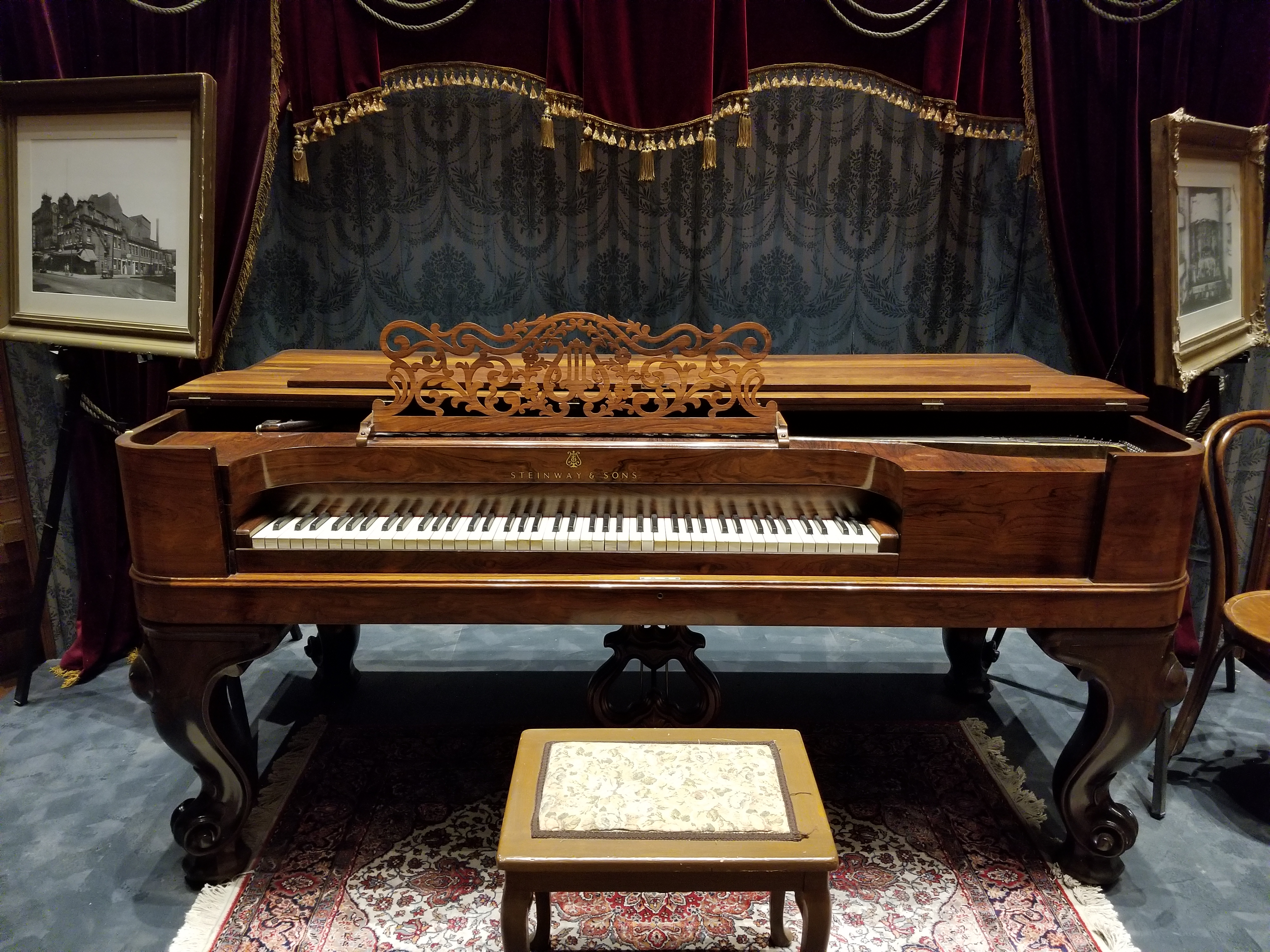
Steinway & Sons square grand piano in the Great Hall of FirstOntario Concert Hall

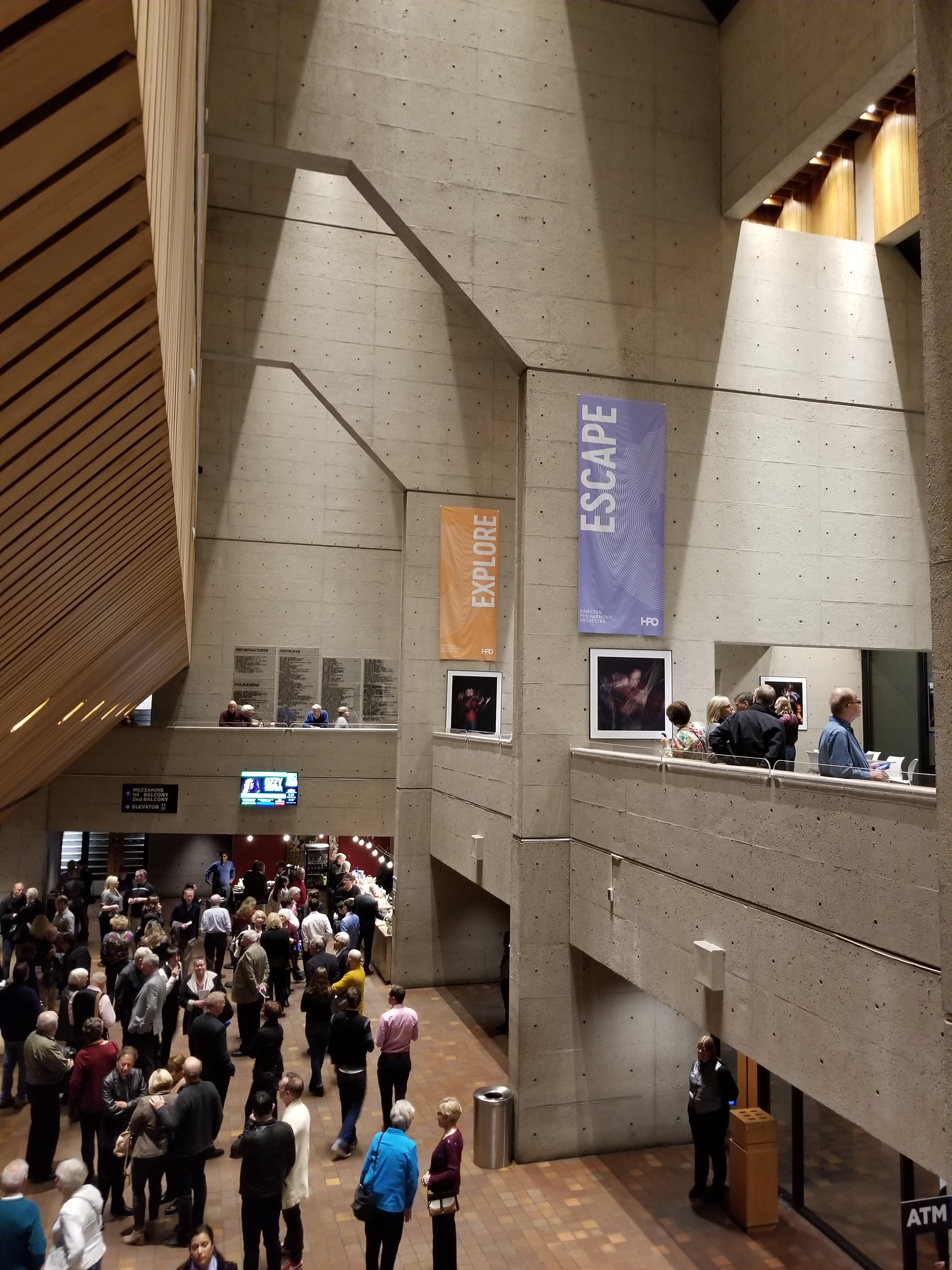
Lobby and mezzanine located within FirstOntario Concert Hall's atrium. The connection to the Hamilton Convention Centre is located in the lobby, and the exit to Commonwealth Square is located on the mezzanine level

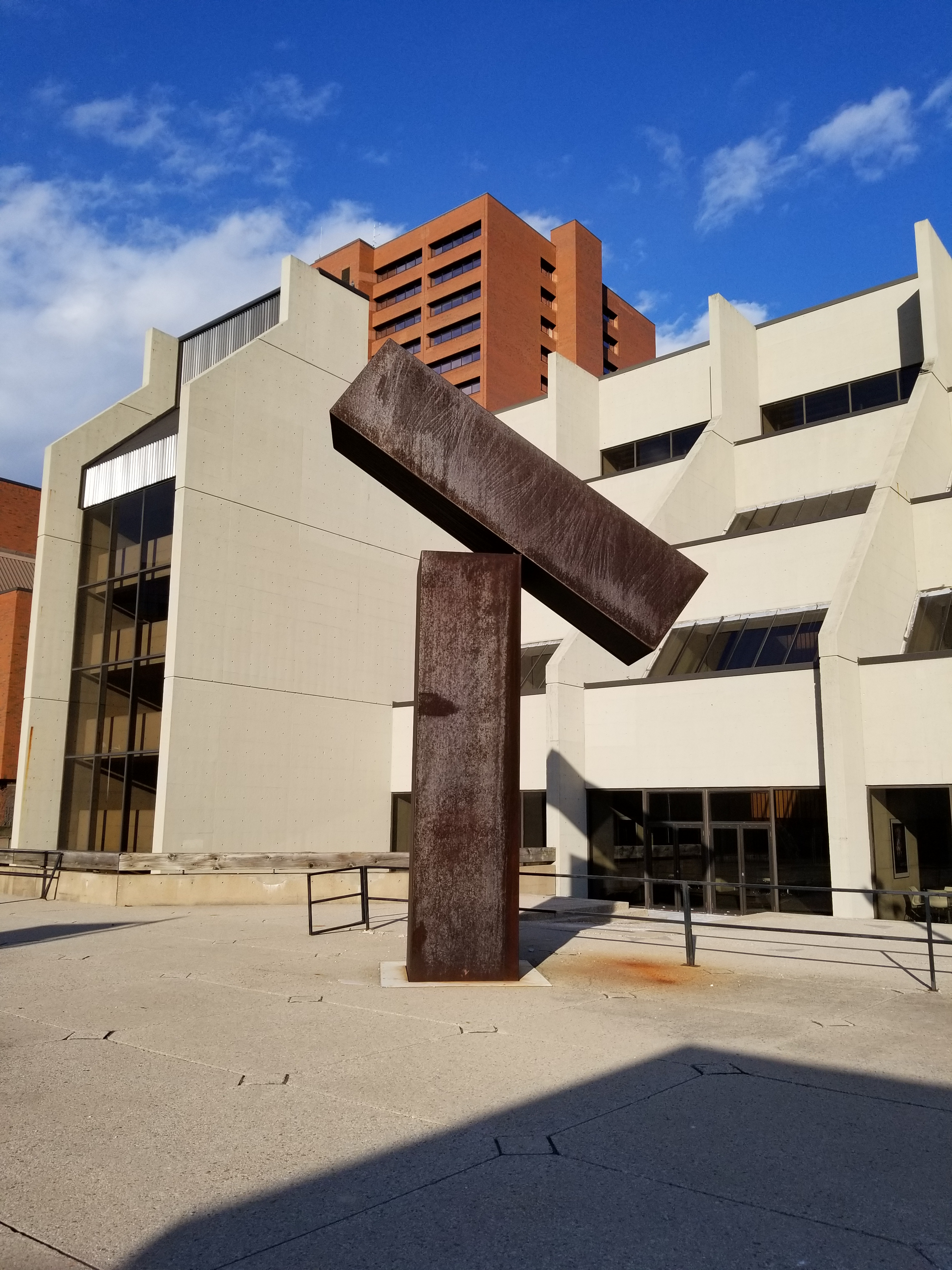
"Canadac", a Stelcoloy sculpture by Kosso Eloul located at Commonwealth Square

== See also ==
- Hamilton Convention Centre
- Ellen Fairclough Building
- Art Gallery of Hamilton
- TD Coliseum
- Sheraton Hamilton
- Lloyd D. Jackson Square
- List of tallest buildings in Hamilton, Ontario
- FirstOntario Performing Arts Centre
