= St. Catharines =

- City (lower-tier)
- City of St. Catharines
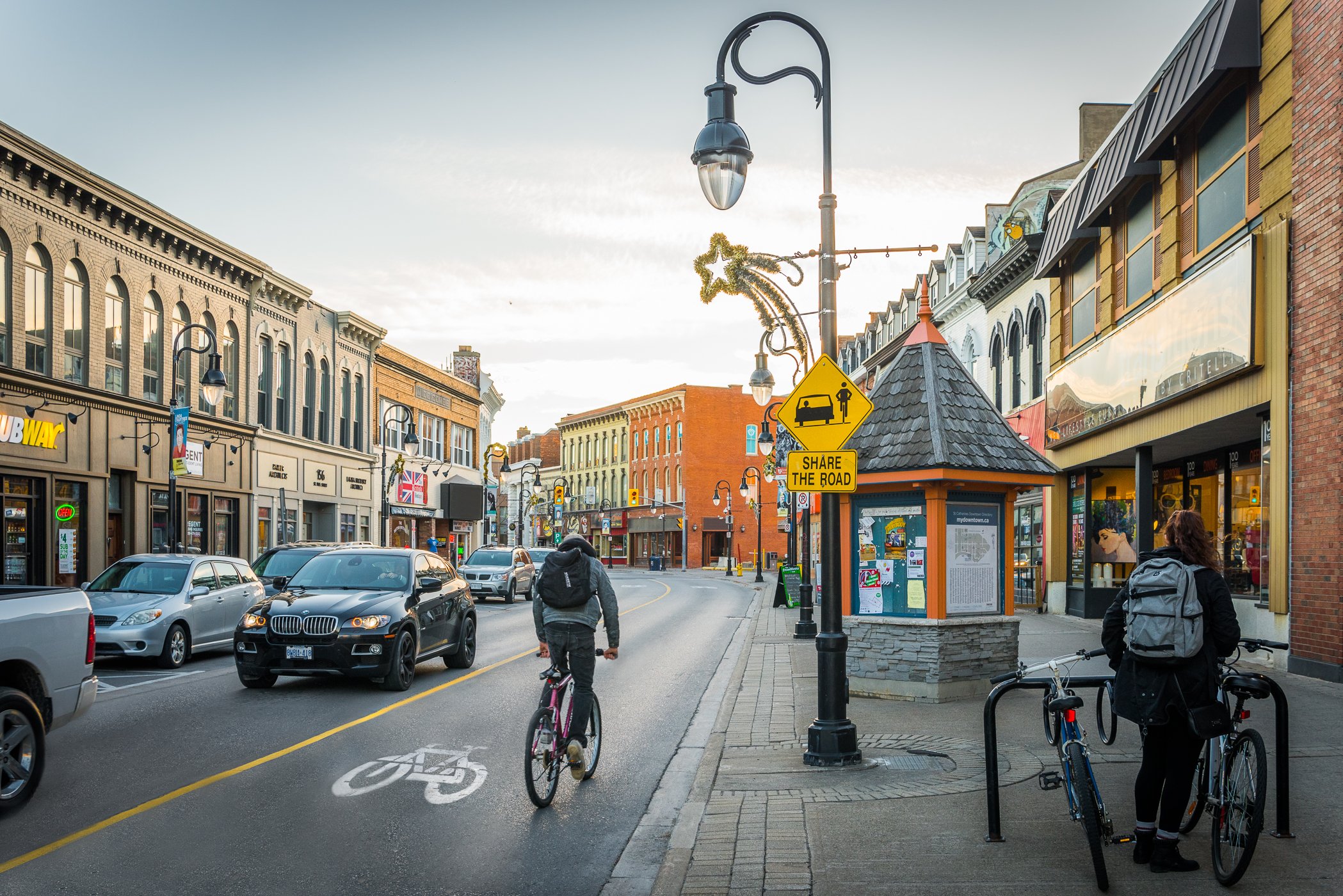
- Downtown St. Catharines

- Flag Coat of arms Logo
- Nicknames: The Garden City, St. Kitts
- Motto: Industry and Liberality
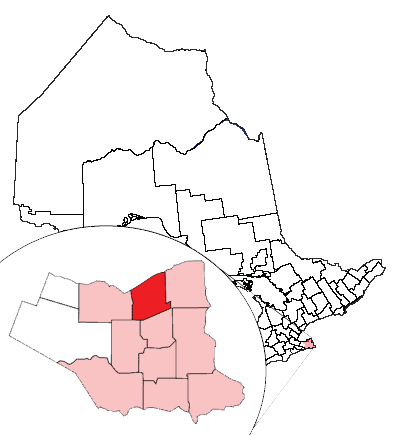
- Location of St. Catharines and its census metropolitan area in Ontario

- Location in Ontario Location in Canada
- Coordinates: 43°09′30″N 79°14′45″W
- Country: Canada
- Province: Ontario
- Region: Niagara
- Settled: 1779; 247 years ago
- Incorporated (town): 1845; 181 years ago
- Incorporated (city): 1876; 150 years ago

Government
  - Mayor: Mat Siscoe
  - Governing body: St. Catharines City Council
  - MPs, and MPPs: Chris Bittle (L); Dean Allison (C); Jeff Burch (NDP); Jennie Stevens (NDP)

Area
  - Land: 96.20 km^{2} (37.14 sq mi)
- Elevation: 97.80 m (320.9 ft)

Population (2021)
  - City (lower-tier): 136,803 (42nd)
  - Metro: 433,604 (13th)
- Time zone: UTC-5 (EST)
  - Summer (DST): UTC-4 (EDT)
- Forward Sortation Area: L2M to L2W
- Area codes: 905, 289, 365, and 742
- Highways: Queen Elizabeth Way; Highway 406; Highway 58
- GDP (St. Catharines–Niagara CMA): CA$17.4 billion (2020)
- GDP per capita (St. Catharines–Niagara CMA): CA$37,505 (2016)
- Website: stcatharines.ca

St. Catharines is the most populous city in Canada's Niagara Region and the 8th-largest urban area in the province of Ontario. As of 2021, St. Catharines has an area of 96.2 square kilometres (37.1 mi^{2}) and 136,803 residents. It lies in Southern Ontario, 51 kilometres (32 mi) south of Toronto across Lake Ontario, and 19 kilometres (12 mi) inland from the international boundary with the United States along the Niagara River. It is the northern entrance of the Welland Canal. St. Catharines carries the official nickname "The Garden City" due to its 4 square kilometres (1.5 mi^{2}) of parks, gardens, and trails.

St. Catharines is between the Greater Toronto and Hamilton Area (GTHA) and the Canada–U.S. border at Fort Erie. Manufacturing was the city's dominant industry, as noted by the heraldic motto, "Industry and Liberality". General Motors of Canada, Ltd., the Canadian subsidiary of General Motors, was the city's largest employer, a distinction now held by the District School Board of Niagara. Rhythm Automotive, formerly TRW and Thompson Products before that, operates two plants in the city, although in recent years, employment there has shifted from heavy industry and manufacturing to services.

St. Catharines lies on one of the main telecommunications backbones between Canada and the United States. As a result, a number of call centres operate in the city. It is designated an Urban Growth Centre by the Growth Plan for the Greater Golden Horseshoe, intended to achieve a minimum density target of 150 jobs and residents combined per hectare by 2032 or earlier.

St. Catharines is also home to Brock University, a campus of Trillium College, and a university prep school Ridley College.

== History ==
=== Early history ===
The Iroquoian speaking Chonnonton peoples, also known as the "people of the deer", lived in the region. The Chonnonton grew vegetables like corn, beans, and squash while living in longhouses. In 1647 the Seneca conquered Chonnonton villages from east of the Niagara River. The Haudenosaunee destroyed the villages in the 1650s. After these attacks and smallpox epidemics, the Chonnontons disappeared completely. Their the last recorded appearance was in 1671 by French explorers.

St. Catharines falls within the original territory of the Mississaugas. A treaty, signed in 1782 between the Mississaugas and the British government, ceded a large tract of land, which included the St. Catharines area, to the Crown for the purpose of European settlement. St. Catharines was settled by Loyalists in the 1780s. The Crown granted land in compensation for services and for losses in the United States. Early histories credit the Loyalists Serjeant Jacob Dittrick and Private John Hainer as among the first settlers to come to the area in 1790. They took their Crown Patents, where Dick's Creek and 12 Mile Creek merge, which is now the city centre of St. Catharines. Historians have speculated that Dick's Creek was named after Richard Pierpoint, a Black Loyalist and former American slave, from an oral history account and events that had taken place around that time that would be consistent with him being the source of the name. Secondary to water routes, indigenous trails provided transportation networks, which resulted in the nearby radial road patterns. The surrounding land was surveyed, and ownships were created between 1787 and 1789.

After the Butler's Rangers disbanded in 1784 and settled the area, Duncan Murray, a former quartermaster in the 84th Regiment of Foot (Royal Highland Emigrants), was appointed by the Crown to distribute free government supplies (victuals) for two years to the resettled Loyalists. He did this from his mill, built on the 12 Mile Creek in Power Glen. After his death in 1786, his holdings were forfeited to the merchant Robert Hamilton of Queenston, who tried to operate for profit the well-established Murray's Distribution Centre and Mill under the management of his cousin. Among other ventures, Hamilton became land wealthy by expropriating lands from subsistence Loyalist settlers who were incapable of settling their debts. Murray's distribution centre, later Hamilton's warehouse, and its location have long been a mystery. Hamilton's major profits were derived from transhipping supplies for the military and civic establishments from his Queenston enterprise, not from charitably supplying the subsistence Loyalist settlers. Hamilton lacked interest in social development and sold his business to Jesse Thompson before the turn of the 19th century.

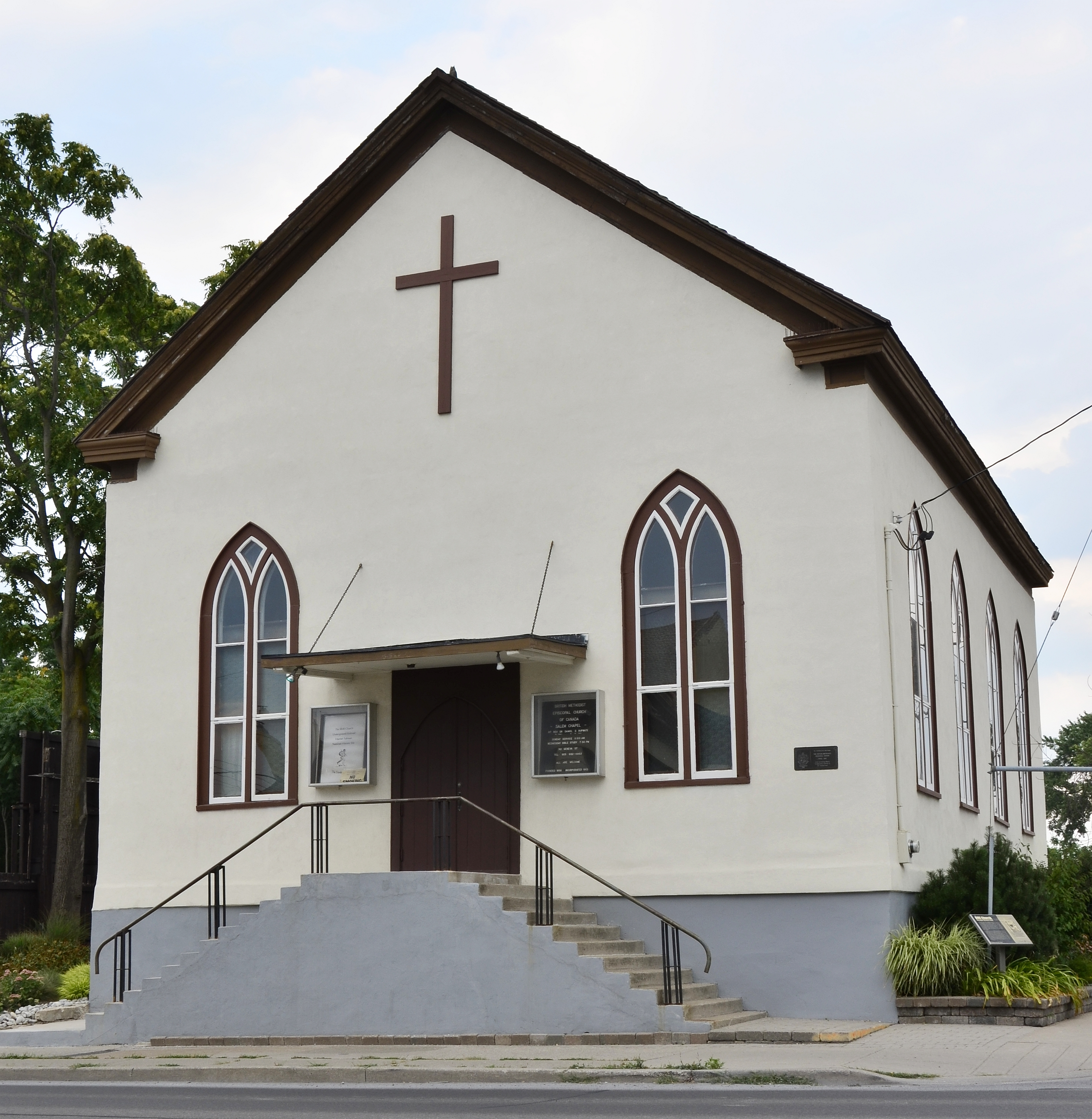
British Methodist Episcopal Church, Salem Chapel; Harriet Tubman attended this church while she lived in St. Catharines.

The Merritt family arrived after this time and was among the later Loyalists to relocate after the American Revolution. They were from the Carolinas, New York, and New Brunswick. In 1796, Thomas Merritt arrived to build on his relationship with his former Commander and Queen's Ranger, John Graves Simcoe, who was now the Lieutenant Governor of Upper Canada. The first Welland Canal was constructed from 1824 to 1833. William Hamilton Merritt worked to promote the ambitious venture by raising funds and enlisting government support. The canal established St. Catharines as the hub of commerce and industry for the Niagara Peninsula. Merritt played a role in making St. Catharines a centre of abolitionist activity. In 1855, the British Methodist Episcopal Church, Salem Chapel was established at the corner of Geneva and North Streets, on land granted to the congregation by Merritt in the early 1840s. The area became known to refugee slaves from the United States as a place of "refuge and rest." It was a destination, one of the final stops in Canada for the Underground Railroad for African-American refugees fleeing slavery. The abolitionist Harriet Tubman lived in St. Catharines. By the mid-1850s, the town's population was about 6,000, of whom 800 were of African descent. St. Catharines remains an important place in Black Canadian history.

At an unknown early date, an inn was built by Thomas Adams on the east side of what is now Ontario Street. It became a community meeting place, election centre, stagecoach stop, and mail delivery deposit. It was preceded by the church and a log school house completed before 1797, all on the east bank of the 12 Mile Creek, at the extreme west end of what was then known as Main Street. This was an extension of the old Iroquois Trail and renamed St. Paul Street by the settlers and their descendants by the mid-19th century. Later, several mills, salt works, numerous retail outlets, a ship building yard, distillery, and various other businesses were developed.

Incorporated as a village in 1845, St. Catharines had a population of about 3,500 in 1846. The primary industry was flour milling. Other industry included ship repairs, four grist mills, a brewery, three distilleries, a tannery, a foundry, a machine, and a pump factory. There were a variety of tradesmen, three bank agencies, and eight taverns. Stage coaches offered service to other towns and villages. There were already six churches or chapels, a post office that received mail daily, a grammar school, and a weekly newspaper.

St. Catharines was incorporated as a city in 1876. The city expanded when it annexed Grantham Township, Merritton, and Port Dalhousie in 1961. Further westward expansion occurred in 1970, when part of Louth Township was amalgamated into St. Catharines as part of a province-wide move to regional government, extending the city boundary to Fifteen Mile Creek, while the remainder of the township was assigned to Lincoln.

=== Origin of name ===
Before it was called St. Catharines, the settlement near Twelve Mile Creek was known by various names, including Shipman's Corners and The Twelve. The name St. Catharines was first recorded in 1796, as St. Catherines, and became a common name for the settlement by 1809, but it would often be spelled with -er- or with an apostrophe before the -s. The name and the spelling were standardized as St. Catharines when the town incorporated in 1845. The Catherine after which the city is named is unclear. Common theories include Saint Catherine of Alexandria, Catherine Butler (wife of Colonel John Butler), and Catherine Askin Hamilton (wife of Robert Hamilton). Catharine Rodman Prendergast Merritt, wife of William Hamilton Merritt, may be the source of the -ar spelling. An alternate theory to explain the spelling was that Catharine with an -ar was the typical spelling of the name for Palatine German settlers in the region.

== Geography ==
=== Climate ===
St. Catharines' climate is humid continental (Köppen borderline Dfa/Dfb). It has a unique micro-climate because of the moderating influence of Lake Ontario/Lake Erie and the sheltering effect of the Niagara Escarpment to the south. This climate allows wineries to flourish. As a result, the city records numerous frost-free days and frequent thaws in the winter, although it sometimes receives heavy lake-effect snow during certain wind conditions, and micro-cooling lakeside on some spring afternoons. The summer season is predominantly warm, sometimes hot and humid, with an average high temperature of 27 °C (81 °F) in July. Summer thunderstorms are commonplace but generally less prevalent and less severe than farther west in southern Ontario, due to the diminishing effect of the surrounding lakes.

The highest temperature ever recorded in St. Catharines was 40.0 °C (104 °F) on 10 July 1936. The coldest temperature ever recorded was −25.7 °C (−14.3 °F) on 18 February 1979.

Climate data for St. Catharines (St. Catharines Airport), 1991–2020 normals, (Note: Only temperature, rest of data is recorded from 1981–2010) extremes 1911–present (Note: Extreme high and low temperatures were recorded at St. Catharines (January 1911 to May 1971) and at St. Catharines Airport (June 1971 to present). Mean minima and maxima are calculated from extreme highs and lows of each month from 1991–2020.)
Month	Jan	Feb	Mar	Apr	May	Jun	Jul	Aug	Sep	Oct	Nov	Dec	Year
Record high humidex	20.8	20.2	29.3	34.5	43.5	44.5	46.1	49.4	42.0	39.0	27.1	25.0	49.4
Record high °C (°F)	20.0 (68.0)	19.4 (66.9)	26.7 (80.1)	32.2 (90.0)	35.0 (95.0)	36.1 (97.0)	40.0 (104.0)	38.3 (100.9)	36.7 (98.1)	31.1 (88.0)	26.8 (80.2)	21.9 (71.4)	40.0 (104.0)
Mean maximum °C (°F)	12.1 (53.8)	11.1 (52.0)	18.0 (64.4)	24.7 (76.5)	29.4 (84.9)	32.1 (89.8)	32.9 (91.2)	32.0 (89.6)	30.4 (86.7)	25.5 (77.9)	19.0 (66.2)	13.2 (55.8)	33.7 (92.7)
Mean daily maximum °C (°F)	−0.2 (31.6)	0.7 (33.3)	5.3 (41.5)	12.4 (54.3)	19.6 (67.3)	24.8 (76.6)	27.3 (81.1)	26.5 (79.7)	22.5 (72.5)	15.3 (59.5)	8.7 (47.7)	2.9 (37.2)	13.8 (56.8)
Daily mean °C (°F)	−3.4 (25.9)	−2.8 (27.0)	1.3 (34.3)	7.5 (45.5)	14.1 (57.4)	19.6 (67.3)	22.3 (72.1)	21.5 (70.7)	17.6 (63.7)	11.0 (51.8)	5.1 (41.2)	−0.1 (31.8)	9.5 (49.1)
Mean daily minimum °C (°F)	−6.6 (20.1)	−6.3 (20.7)	−2.7 (27.1)	2.5 (36.5)	8.6 (47.5)	14.4 (57.9)	17.3 (63.1)	16.5 (61.7)	12.7 (54.9)	6.7 (44.1)	1.5 (34.7)	−3 (27)	5.1 (41.2)
Mean minimum °C (°F)	−16.7 (1.9)	−15.8 (3.6)	−11.9 (10.6)	−3.8 (25.2)	1.6 (34.9)	7.4 (45.3)	11.4 (52.5)	10.4 (50.7)	4.9 (40.8)	−0.8 (30.6)	−6.0 (21.2)	−12.0 (10.4)	−18.2 (−0.8)
Record low °C (°F)	−23.8 (−10.8)	−25.7 (−14.3)	−21.1 (−6.0)	−15 (5)	−4.4 (24.1)	1.0 (33.8)	6.0 (42.8)	2.6 (36.7)	0.0 (32.0)	−7 (19)	−13.9 (7.0)	−24.4 (−11.9)	−25.7 (−14.3)
Record low wind chill	−42.0	−34.6	−28.3	−19.7	−2.9	0.0	0.0	0.0	0.0	−8.3	−18.9	−28.0	−42.0
Average precipitation mm (inches)	65.2 (2.57)	54.9 (2.16)	61.7 (2.43)	77.0 (3.03)	76.8 (3.02)	85.9 (3.38)	77.8 (3.06)	70.3 (2.77)	90.6 (3.57)	67.0 (2.64)	81.6 (3.21)	71.5 (2.81)	880.1 (34.65)
Average rainfall mm (inches)	30.8 (1.21)	28.9 (1.14)	39.3 (1.55)	71.2 (2.80)	76.3 (3.00)	86.0 (3.39)	77.8 (3.06)	70.3 (2.77)	90.6 (3.57)	67.0 (2.64)	72.1 (2.84)	44.0 (1.73)	754.2 (29.69)
Average snowfall cm (inches)	38.6 (15.2)	29.3 (11.5)	23.2 (9.1)	5.8 (2.3)	0.4 (0.2)	0.0 (0.0)	0.0 (0.0)	0.0 (0.0)	0.0 (0.0)	0.1 (0.0)	9.6 (3.8)	30.1 (11.9)	137.1 (54.0)
Average precipitation days (≥ 0.2 mm)	16.5	13.4	13.3	13.9	11.5	10.9	9.8	9.7	10.9	11.8	14.1	15.2	150.7
Average rainy days (≥ 0.2 mm)	5.8	5.8	8.4	12.4	11.5	10.9	9.8	9.7	10.9	11.8	12.1	8.1	117.0
Average snowy days (≥ 0.2 cm)	12.3	9.1	6.5	2.4	0.05	0.0	0.0	0.0	0.0	0.10	3.0	9.4	42.7
Average relative humidity (%)	73.0	67.7	62.9	57.6	55.9	58.1	57.5	59.0	60.5	64.5	69.1	71.9	63.1
Mean monthly sunshine hours	64.5	106.8	140.5	166.5	242.3	279.9	277.6	255.3	185.0	155.2	80.5	69.3	2,023.4
Percentage possible sunshine	22.2	36.2	38.1	41.5	53.3	60.9	59.6	59.1	49.2	45.2	27.5	24.7	43.1
Source 1: Environment and Climate Change Canada (precipitation/rainfall/snow/sun/relative humidity 1981–2010)
Source 2: Canada Weather Stats(for temperatures, including mean minima and maxima 1991–2020)

=== Communities ===
St. Catharines' development history has resulted in a number of unique and distinct communities within the city. The historical area of St. Catharines consisted of nothing more than what is now the downtown core, with the remaining land being part of Louth Township on the west and Grantham Township on the east. St. Catharines continued to steadily grow through the late 19th and early 20th centuries, eventually annexing land to the southwest that would become Western Hill and Old Glenridge, and to the east and north that would collectively become the central part of St. Catharines. In addition to the growth of St. Catharines, the town of Merritton and the town of Port Dalhousie existed as separate municipalities to the south and north of the city, each slowly growing their own residential base.

Along with the rest of Ontario, St. Catharines experienced explosive growth after World War II. St. Catharines continued to annex Grantham Township as development continued, including the large swaths of land to the north known now as "The North End". St. Catharines would also absorb Merritton and Port Dalhousie in 1961, making them part of the city. During this time, St. Catharines nearly tripled in population.

With the formation of the Regional Municipality of Niagara in 1970, the portion of Louth Township east of Fifteen Mile Creek was transferred to the City of St. Catharines. This included the eastern portion of the Hamlet of Rockway, as well as the Hamlet of Power Glen. The few remaining portions of Grantham Township in the Northeast corner of the area, including Port Weller, were also transferred to the city. With the new Louth Township lands belonging to the city, St. Catharines would begin two developments in the west end — Martindale Road in 1983, and Vansickle Road in 1987. These developments are nearing completion. There was also a push to continue further expansion to the west in the late 1990s, but this has since been halted by Ontario Greenbelt legislation.

The following distinct communities exist within St. Catharines:

- Carlton - Bunting
- Grantham
- Port Dalhousie
- Lakeshore
- Port Weller
- Facer
- Lancaster
- Michigan Beach
- The North End
- St. George's Point
- Kernahan
- Merritton
- Oakdale
- Secord Woods
- Queenston
- Fitzgerald
- Haig
- Orchard Park
- Downtown St. Catharines
- Barbican Heights
- Brockview
- Glenridge
- Marsdale
- Riverview
- Louth
- Martindale Heights
- Power Glen
- Vansickle
- Western Hill

==== Downtown ====
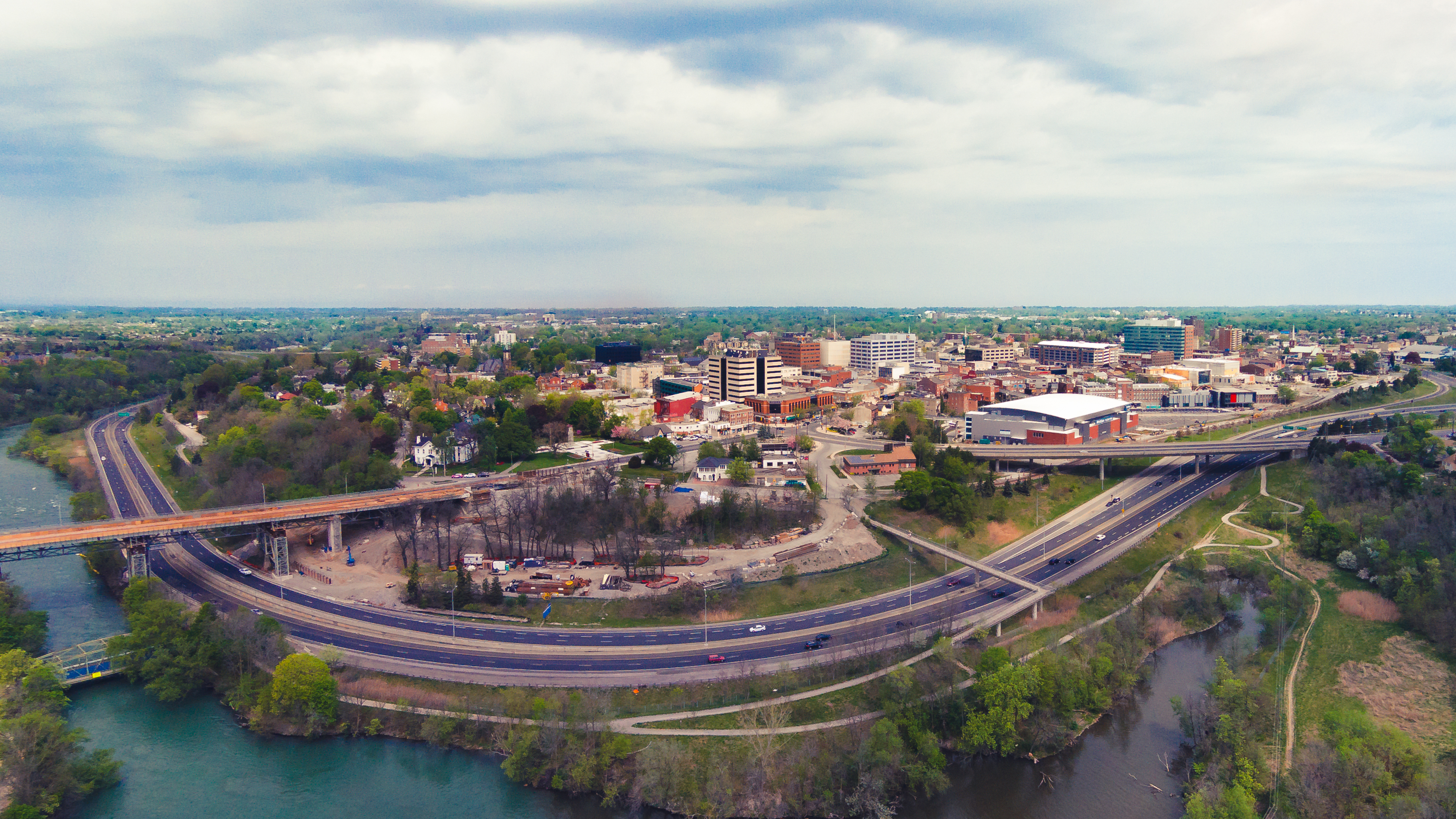
Aerial view of downtown St. Catharines

Numerous efforts have been made to improve the downtown. The restructuring of manufacturing resulted in a loss of jobs and retail businesses. In the early 21st century, city, university, and private developers undertook several initiatives to revive downtown, related to urban design, clustering activities to attract people to the area as a destination from day through evening events.

In 2006, city council approved converting one-way arteries through the city centre to allow for two-way traffic, to make it easier for people to make their way around the city to explore it. In terms of urban planning and use, two-way traffic improves circulation within the area. The city wanted to improve downtown as a destination, rather than a place to pass through. The council also wanted to have downtown St. Catharines on the Wine Route, a driving tour of Niagara wineries and an Ontario Wine Council initiative to boost the number of visitors to the region's many wineries. The Wine Route was modified to officially redirect winery goers through the downtown starting in 2012. The first phase of two-way traffic was completed in 2009, with St. Paul and King streets being converted. The cost of the conversion was $3.5 million and was shared with Niagara Region. In 2012, most observers concluded that the change had achieved its goals; it garnered national media attention.

In 2009, $54 million in joint federal, provincial and municipal funding was announced for the construction of a performing arts centre in the city's core, officially opened in September 2015 as the FirstOntario Performing Arts Centre. Complementing the centre, which features concert, dance and film venues, is Brock University's Marilyn I. Walker School of Fine and Performing Arts. The university renovated the former Canada Hair Cloth Building to use for the school. This former industrial building is behind St. Paul Street and next to the municipal performing arts centre.

In late 2011, city council approved moving forward with the construction of a new spectator facility to replace the crumbling Garden City Arena Complex, built in 1938. Council voted to build a U-shaped facility, which will be home to the Niagara IceDogs, an Ontario Hockey League team, and be able to host other events, such as concerts. It would have room for 4,500 to 5,300 spectators. The goal is to keep the cost of the facility at or below $50 million and to build it on a swath of land known locally as the lower-level parking lot, behind St. Paul Street and abutting Highway 406. Council's commitment to build the facility resulted in IceDogs' owner Bill Burke promising to sign a 20-year lease with the city after he threatened to move his team if the city chose not to build a new arena.

The city has made other infrastructure improvements to the downtown. In January 2012, a new edition of the Carlisle Street Parking Garage opened. It was built to Leadership in Energy and Environmental Design standards and was certified for its environmentally friendly features, including a green roof, preferred carpool and hybrid vehicle parking, greywater collection, permeable interlocking brick pavement, and several bike racks for users. A mixed-use development, the structure was planned for retail space at street level on Carlisle Street, in order to promote activity and business on the street. The project cost $27.9 million, with funding split three ways between the federal, provincial and municipal governments. Starting in 2019, certain streets located in downtown St. Catharines have been closed during weekends to vehicle traffic. These pedestrian zones have expanded over time. $214,500 (~$251,077 in 2025) was allocated in the city's budget in 2021 for these road closures. In 2023, this initiative was discontinued.

== Demographics ==
St. Catharines
Year	Pop.	±%
1841	3,500	—
1871	7,864	+124.7%
1881	9,631	+22.5%
1891	9,170	−4.8%
1901	9,946	+8.5%
1911	12,484	+25.5%
1921	19,881	+59.3%
1931	24,753	+24.5%
1941	30,025	+21.3%
1951	37,984	+26.5%
1961	84,472	+122.4%
1971	109,722	+29.9%
1981	124,018	+13.0%
1991	129,300	+4.3%
1996	130,926	+1.3%
2001	129,170	−1.3%
2006	131,989	+2.2%
2011	131,400	−0.4%
2016	133,113	+1.3%
2021	136,803	+2.8%

Ethnic origin 2021 (>2000 population)	Population	Percent
English	31,030	23.1%
Scottish	24,775	18.4%
Irish	22,070	16.4%
Canadian	19,025	14.2%
German	16,000	11.9%
Italian	12,515	9.3%
French	11,345	8.4%
Dutch	9,120	6.8%
Ukrainian	6,955	5.2%
Polish	6,930	5.2%
British Isles n.o.s.	6,015	4.5%
Welsh	2,600	1.9%
Russian	2,440	1.8%
Chinese	2,405	1.8%
Hungarian	2,290	1.7%
Caucasian (White), n.o.s.	2,215	1.6%
First Nations n.o.s. + North American Indigenous, n.o.s.	2,185	1.6%
French Canadian	2,130	1.6%
Indian (India)	2,110	1.6%
Filipino	2,020	1.5%

Largest ethnic origin in St. Catharines - Niagara CMA by census tract based on the 2021 census

In the 2021 Census of Population conducted by Statistics Canada, St. Catharines had a population of 136,803 living in 58,903 of its 61,977 total private dwellings, a change of 2.8% from its 2016 population of 133,113. With a land area of 96.2 km^{2} (37.1 sq mi), it had a population density of 1,422.1/km^{2} (3,683.1/sq mi) in 2021.

At the census metropolitan area (CMA) level in the 2021 census, the St. Catharines - Niagara CMA had a population of 433,604 living in 179,224 of its 190,878 total private dwellings, a change of 6.8% from its 2016 population of 406,074. With a land area of 1,397.09 km^{2} (539.42 sq mi), it had a population density of 310.4/km^{2} (803.8/sq mi) in 2021.

Since 1998, St. Catharines has had one of the highest obesity rates of any centre in Canada. A 2001 analysis by Statistics Canada showed that 57.3 percent of its residents were overweight. This caused the media, including CTV, the Canadian Broadcasting Corporation and The Globe and Mail to dub St. Catharines as Canada's "fattest" city. In 2008, new statistics were released that show that the percentage of obese or obese/overweight residents of Hamilton (74.3%), Kingston (70.1%), and St. John's, Newfoundland and Labrador (70%) is now higher than St. Catharines-Niagara (69.3%), though the obesity rate in St. Catharines was higher in 2008 than in 1998.

23% of children in St. Catharines were estimated to be living in poverty as of 2015, which was above Canada's average rate of child poverty. In 2022, the municipality itself as an employer became the largest in Ontario to offer a living wage, an action praised by the Niagara Poverty Reduction Network.

=== Ethnicity ===
As of the 2021 Census, 16.5% of residents were visible minorities, 2.5% had Indigenous identity, and the remaining 81.0% were White. The largest visible minority groups were Black (4.1%), South Asian (2.5%), Latin American (2.3%), Chinese (1.6%), Filipino (1.5%) and Arab (1.3%).

Panethnic groups in the City of St. Catharines (2001−2021)
Panethnic group	2021		2016		2011		2006		2001	
Panethnic group	Pop.	%	Pop.	%	Pop.	%	Pop.	%	Pop.	%
European (Note: Statistic includes all persons that did not make up part of a visible minority or an indigenous identity.)	108,815	81%	109,770	84.54%	113,650	88.26%	115,060	88.5%	117,020	92.23%
African	5,540	4.12%	3,715	2.86%	2,675	2.08%	2,615	2.01%	1,910	1.51%
South Asian	3,325	2.48%	1,865	1.44%	1,430	1.11%	1,690	1.3%	1,385	1.09%
Indigenous	3,305	2.46%	3,550	2.73%	2,425	1.88%	1,915	1.47%	1,480	1.17%
Southeast Asian (Note: Statistic includes total responses of "Filipino" and "Southeast Asian" under visible minority section on census.)	3,295	2.45%	2,340	1.8%	1,675	1.3%	2,175	1.67%	1,215	0.96%
East Asian (Note: Statistic includes total responses of "Chinese", "Korean", and "Japanese" under visible minority section on census.)	3,090	2.3%	3,475	2.68%	2,565	1.99%	2,100	1.62%	1,710	1.35%
Latin American	3,065	2.28%	2,175	1.68%	1,920	1.49%	2,310	1.78%	785	0.62%
Middle Eastern (Note: Statistic includes total responses of "West Asian" and "Arab" under visible minority section on census.)	2,130	1.59%	1,780	1.37%	1,630	1.27%	1,550	1.19%	870	0.69%
Other (Note: Statistic includes total responses of "Visible minority, n.i.e." and "Multiple visible minorities" under visible minority section on census.)	1,770	1.32%	1,175	0.9%	780	0.61%	595	0.46%	500	0.39%
Total responses	134,335	98.2%	129,845	97.54%	128,765	97.99%	130,005	98.5%	126,875	98.22%
Total population	136,803	100%	133,113	100%	131,400	100%	131,989	100%	129,170	100%

- Note: Totals greater than 100% due to multiple origin responses.

=== Religion ===
Largest non-Christian in St. Catharines - Niagara CMA by census tracts based on 2021 census

In 2021, 58.3% of residents were Christians, down from 71.8% in 2011. 25.8% of residents were Catholic, 17.8% were Protestant, 9.4% were Christians of unspecified denomination, 1.3% were Christian Orthodox, and 3.9 were other Christian/Christian related traditions. 35.9% of the population had were irreligious or secular, up from 24.5% in 2011. All other religions/spiritual traditions made up 5.8% of the population. The largest non-Christian religions were Islam (3.4%), Buddhism (0.6%), and Hinduism (0.6%).

== Economy ==
Tourism was considered to be an influential factor in Conference Board of Canada's projected GDP growth for St. Catharines. Its economy is affected by the millions of tonnes of cargo shipped through the Welland Canal, as well as 140 industrial buildings based in the city. In 2023, waste management company Ssonix Products had an explosion that killed an employee. A year later, firefighters began an audit of hazardous materials contained in the city's buildings.

St. Catharines was the location of a transmission plant for General Motors. The 20 hectare property where the factory once operated is now classified as a contaminated brownfield. In 2025, the Information and Privacy Commissioner of Ontario ordered the city to release reports regarding the extent of the environmental contamination on the site. Lead, trichloroethylene, benzene, and polychlorinated biphenyls were present beyond safe limits. The city previously refused freedom of information requests by residents due to concerns that the report could harm General Motor's reputation.

== Arts and culture ==
=== Theatre ===
St. Catharines is also home to a variety of theatre companies. These companies include Garden City Productions (formerly the Operatic Society of Grantham United Church 1956–1962), Carousel Players (in the Old Courthouse), Mirror Theatre, Essential Collectives Theatre, and the Empty Box Theatre Company. In 2015, the FirstOntario Performing Arts Centre opened. In 2016, the Film House launched within the space, featuring cinema screenings with themed or genre-specific nights.

=== Events ===
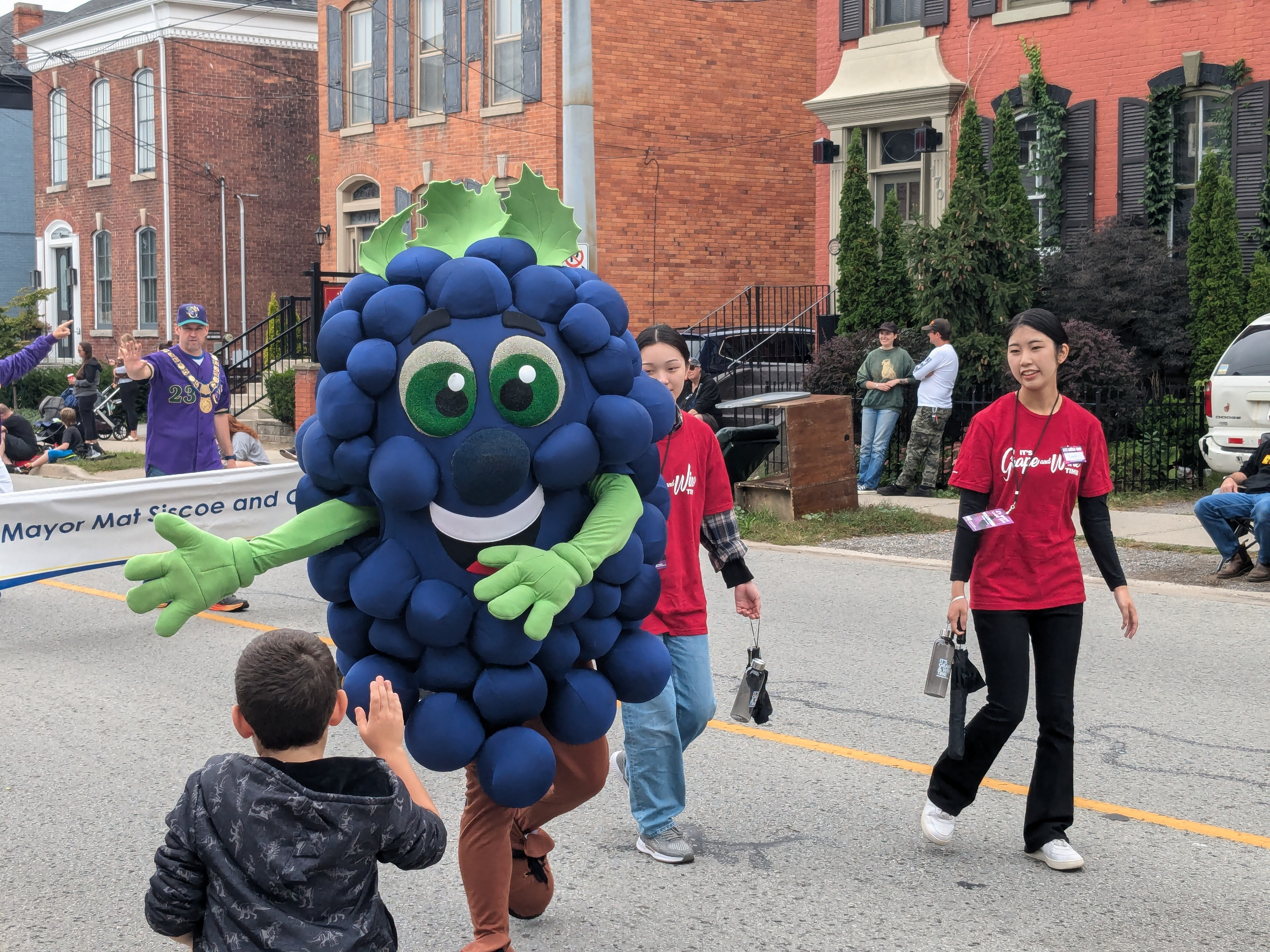
The Grape and Wine Festival Parade in 2024

The Grape and Wine Festival Parade is held annually each September. More than 100,000 people were anticipated for the 2022 event.

The International Chicken Chucking Championships takes place every January in the St. Catharines neighbourhood of Port Dalhousie and attracts hundreds of participants and observers. Chicken Chucking consists of pitching or sliding frozen chickens along the ice-covered Martindale Pond and is hosted by the Kilt and Clover. Animal rights groups such as Niagara Action for Animals have protested the event. Proceeds from the event are donated to Community Care, a local food bank.

St. Catharines was one of the cities that hosted the 2022 Canada Summer Games. More than 5,000 athletes and coaches arrived for the games, which took place from August 6 to August 21, 2022. The opening ceremony was held at the Meridian Centre. The city previously hosted the 2016 IIHF U18 Women's World Championship.

== Attractions ==
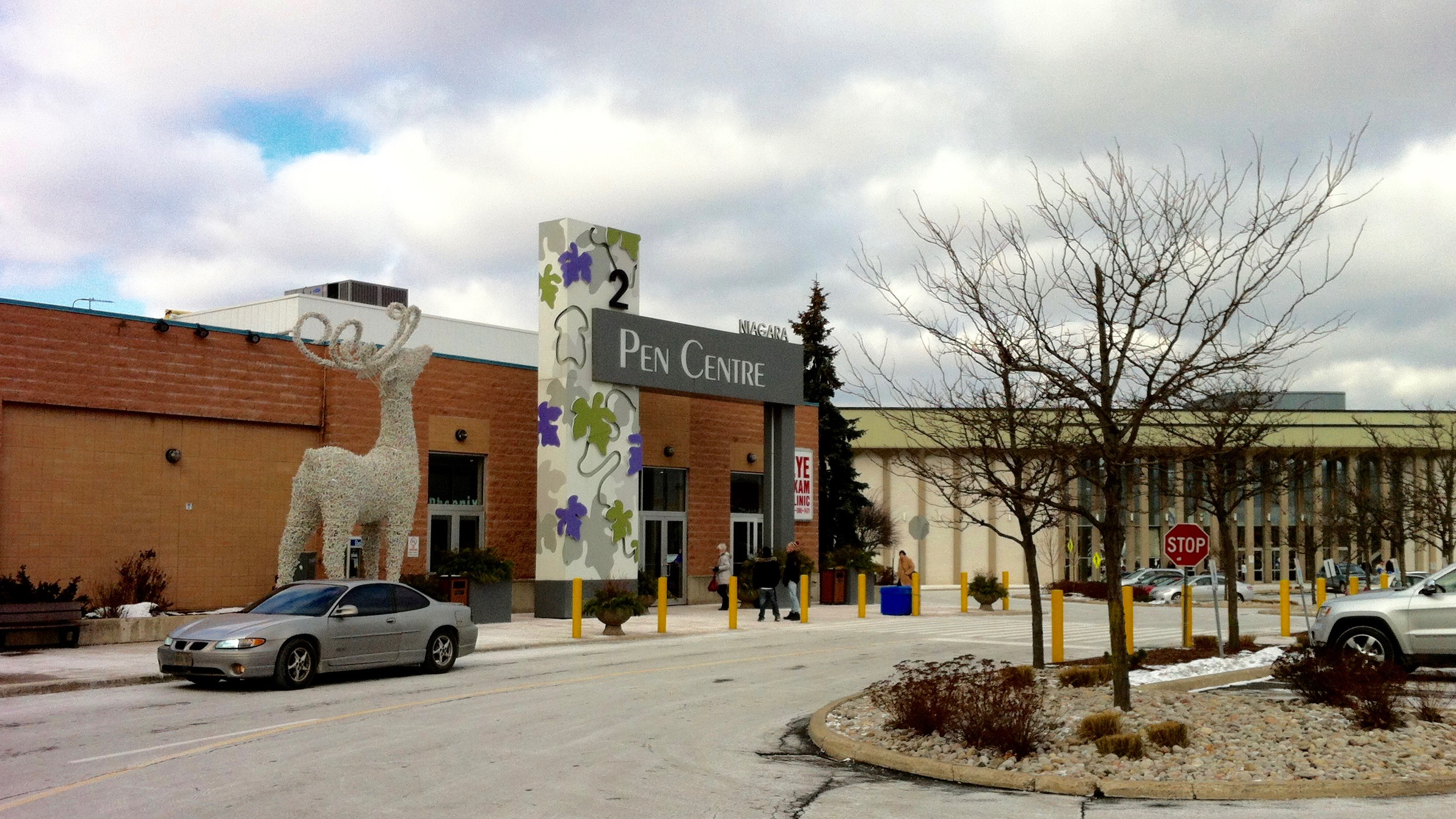
The Pen Centre, a regional shopping centre

- Lakeside Park Carousel – historic carousel located in Port Dahousie
- St. Catharines Museum – located at Lock 3 of the Welland Canal
- Morningstar Mill – heritage site and mill
- Pen Centre – a regional shopping centre
- The St. Catharines Armoury is a recognized Federal Heritage building, #1991 on the Register of the Government of Canada Heritage Buildings.

=== Parks ===
- Montebello Park: Designed by Frederick Law Olmsted in 1887, who was renowned for designing and developing New York City's Central Park in 1853. A commemorative rose garden, with over 1,300 bushes in 25 varieties, is the city's largest rose collection; it features an ornamental fountain. The focal point of the park is a band shell and pavilion built in 1888. The park is designated under the Ontario Heritage Act.
- Lakeside Park: Located in the North end, along the shores of Lake Ontario in the community known as Port Dalhousie. Hosts yearly fireworks displays on 1 July (Canada Day). Has picnic areas, a pavilion, snack bar, change rooms, washrooms, playground equipment, boardwalk, the Lakeside Park Carousel, and public docks for visiting boaters. The beach offers magnificent sunset views over Lake Ontario. Lakeside Park inspired a song by the rock band Rush which describes the park itself and drummer/lyricist Neil Peart's memories there.
- Burgoyne Woods: A 50-hectare (0.5 km^{2}) wooded area and recreational park near the Downtown core. It also contains a dog park and is the host of annual cross country races within the District School Board of Niagara (DSBN) and the Niagara Catholic District School Board (NCDSB).
- Happy Rolph's Bird Sanctuary: A 6-hectare (0.06 km^{2}) park on the shores of Lake Ontario in the community of Port Weller. It is home to hundreds of native and migratory birds and features an exotic collection of flowering rhododendrons. An onsite petting farm (containing horses, pigs, sheep, goats and llamas, as well as a donkey named 'Hoti'—'Don Quixote') is operated by the city from Victoria Day to Thanksgiving weekend. A trail running throughout the park leads to a peaceful waterfront memorial to Canadian victims of the 9/11 terrorist attacks.
- Ontario Jaycee Gardens: Overlooking the Henley Rowing Course, this is the city's largest horticultural park, with more than 8 hectares (0.08 km^{2}) of meticulously landscaped gardens and flower displays. Among the displays is a memorial site dedicated to Kristen French. The park exists on land that once featured the Third Welland Canal. The former entrance to the canal can still be seen at the north-west end of the park.
- Walker Arboretum: Located along the hillside of Rodman Hall and the Twelve Mile Creek below, the original owner of this estate was Thomas Rodman Merritt, son of William Hamilton Merritt. In the late 19th century, an English landscape designer named Samuel Richardson was hired by Merritt to tend the grounds. As a result, the arboretum is an extensive, rambling garden with rare conifers which benefit from an exceptional micro-climate. It boasts one of the largest Chinese Empress trees in Canada.
- Woodgale Park: Located along Glendale Avenue between Glenridge Avenue and the Pen Centre. Features wide open spaces, flowing fruit trees, rare birds, a soccer field and tennis courts. Also features a memorial to the original farm building on the north end of the park near Denis Morris Catholic High School. Locally known as Doug Hill Park, after a nearby resident who coached a number of baseball and tug of war teams in this area.

=== Trail system ===
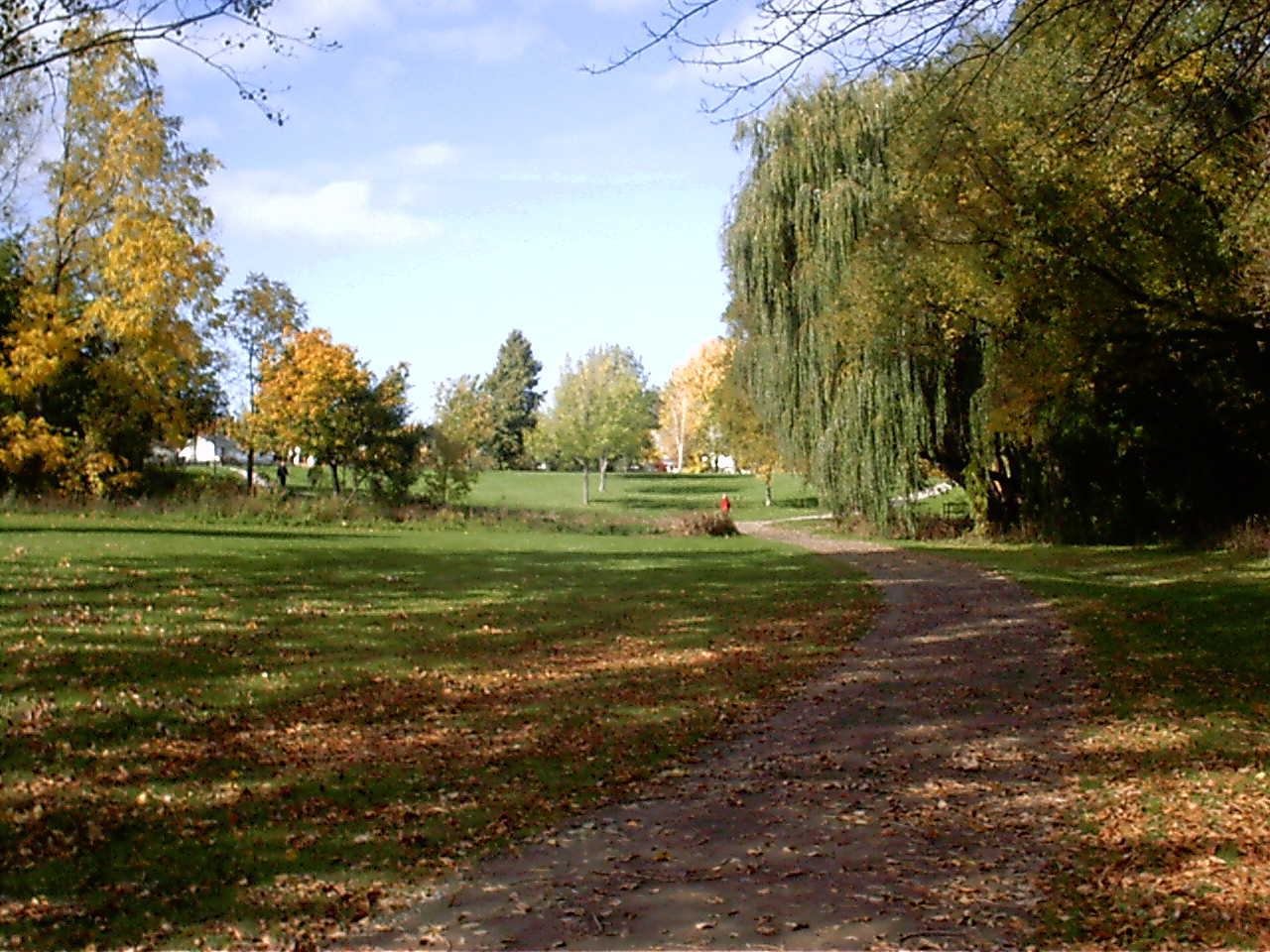
Walker's Creek, one of the paths and parks for which St. Catharines is known

The city's trail system offers over 90 kilometres (55 mi) of accessible pathways that are suitable for walking, jogging, cycling, hiking and cross-country skiing.

- Bruce Trail: Canada's oldest and longest hiking trail, following the Niagara Escarpment (designated as a UNESCO World Biosphere Reserve site) from Niagara-on-the-Lake to Tobermory. A 20-kilometre (12 mi) section with associated side trails winds through St. Catharines passing by places such as the Morningstar Mill.
- Merritt Trail: a segmented 11 km (6.8 mi) trail that passes many of the old sections of the second Welland Canal and remnants of its locks.
- Laura Secord Legacy Trail – a trail that was established to commemorate Laura Secord's 32 km walk to warn of an upcoming American attack during the War of 1812.
- Terry Fox Trail: a 1.5 km trail that runs along Carlon Street and Geneva Street. Six exercise stations are placed throughout it.
- Waterfront Trail: follows the shore of Lake Ontario, connecting communities from Niagara-on-the-Lake to Brockville. The Port Dalhousie portion of the trail is a major highlight.
- Welland Canals Parkway Trail: The trail is 45 km, stretching from St. Catharines to Port Colborne.

== Sports ==
=== Ice hockey ===
St. Catharines entered into the Ontario Hockey Association Junior 'A' Hockey in 1943 as the St. Catharines Falcons. In 1947, they became the Teepees and were affiliated with the American Hockey League's Buffalo Bisons. When the National Hockey League's (NHL) Chicago Blackhawks made the Bisons their number one farm team, they inherited the Teepees. In the 1960s, the Jr. 'A' team went deeply into debt to the Chicago Black Hawks, but continued as a successful franchise and were named the St. Catharines Black Hawks. The Hamilton Fincups moved to St. Catharines in 1976 and played here for one year before moving back to Hamilton. The AHL St. Catharines Saints played in St. Catharines between 1982 and 1986, before being forced to re-locate to Newmarket due to protests from the NHL Buffalo Sabres. The St. Catharines Saints served as the farm team for the Toronto Maple Leafs, and today are known as the Toronto Marlies.

In 2007, the OHL's Mississauga IceDogs relocated to St. Catharines and became the Niagara IceDogs. The IceDogs played out of the Jack Gatecliff Arena, which was renamed the Gatorade Garden City Complex (since renamed Garden City Arena Complex). In 2014, the IceDogs moved to the newly built Meridian Centre. Since starting out the team has won the Emms Trophy in 2010–2011 & 2018–2019. They have also won the Bobby Orr Trophy during 2011–2012 season and 2015–2016 season, qualifying for the OHL Finals. They would be beaten both times by the London Knights. The team has had numerous NHL alumni including Alex Pietrangelo, Dougie Hamilton, Vince Dunn, Ryan Strome, Akil Thomas, Jason Robertson and Alex Nedeljkovic.

The current St. Catharines Falcons team plays in the Golden Horseshoe Division of the Greater Ontario Junior Hockey League. The team has played since 1968 and plays all home games out of the Jack Gatecliff Arena. The team were runners up for the Sutherland Cup in 1979, 1990, 1994, 1997, 2000 and 2014, but won the cup in 2012.

=== Basketball ===
In 2015, the National Basketball League of Canada announced that Niagara had been awarded a new franchise to play in the Meridian Centre. The team, named the Niagara River Lions, began play in 2015 where they reached the conference quarterfinals. The team joined the Canadian Elite Basketball League after the 2017–18 season. In 2021, the River Lions had one of their best seasons, finishing 2nd with a 10–4 record. The River Lions made it through the playoffs into the finals, where they lost 65–101 to the Edmonton Stingers. In 2024, the River Lions Captured their 1st CEBL Championship with a 97-95 win over the Vancouver Bandits. The River Lions finished 14-6 led by a perfect 11-0 Home record.

=== Baseball ===
The city was the home of the New York–Penn League's St. Catharines Blue Jays, the Short-season A affiliate of the Toronto Blue Jays, from 1986 to 1999. In 1996 the team was renamed the St. Catharines Stompers, and was subsequently sold and relocated to Queens, New York City in late 1999, where they became the Queens Kings.

=== Rugby ===
St. Catharines Tigers RFC was formed in 1978. Beginning in 2015, the Tigers joined the Niagara Wasps RFC and play at their field in Thorold.

=== Soccer ===
Minor league soccer arrived to St. Catharines in 1971, when St. Catharines Heidelberg received a franchise in the National Soccer League (NSL). Heidelberg played in the league for eight seasons, leaving in 1979. The city received another team in the NSL, with St. Catharines Roma Wolves acquiring Welland Lions Croatia's franchise rights in 1977. St. Catharines Roma competed in the NSL until the 1997 season, and continued playing in the NSL's successor league, the Canadian Professional Soccer League (later renamed Canadian Soccer League) in 1998. St. Catharines' most successful era was in the 1990s, when the club won several championships, including a league double in 1995. The club found further success in the CPSL and won two championships. In 2014, the club would leave the CSL circuit.

In 2021, St. Catharines Wolves returned to the semi-professional level by joining League1 Ontario with Club Roma as their home venue.

=== Rowing ===
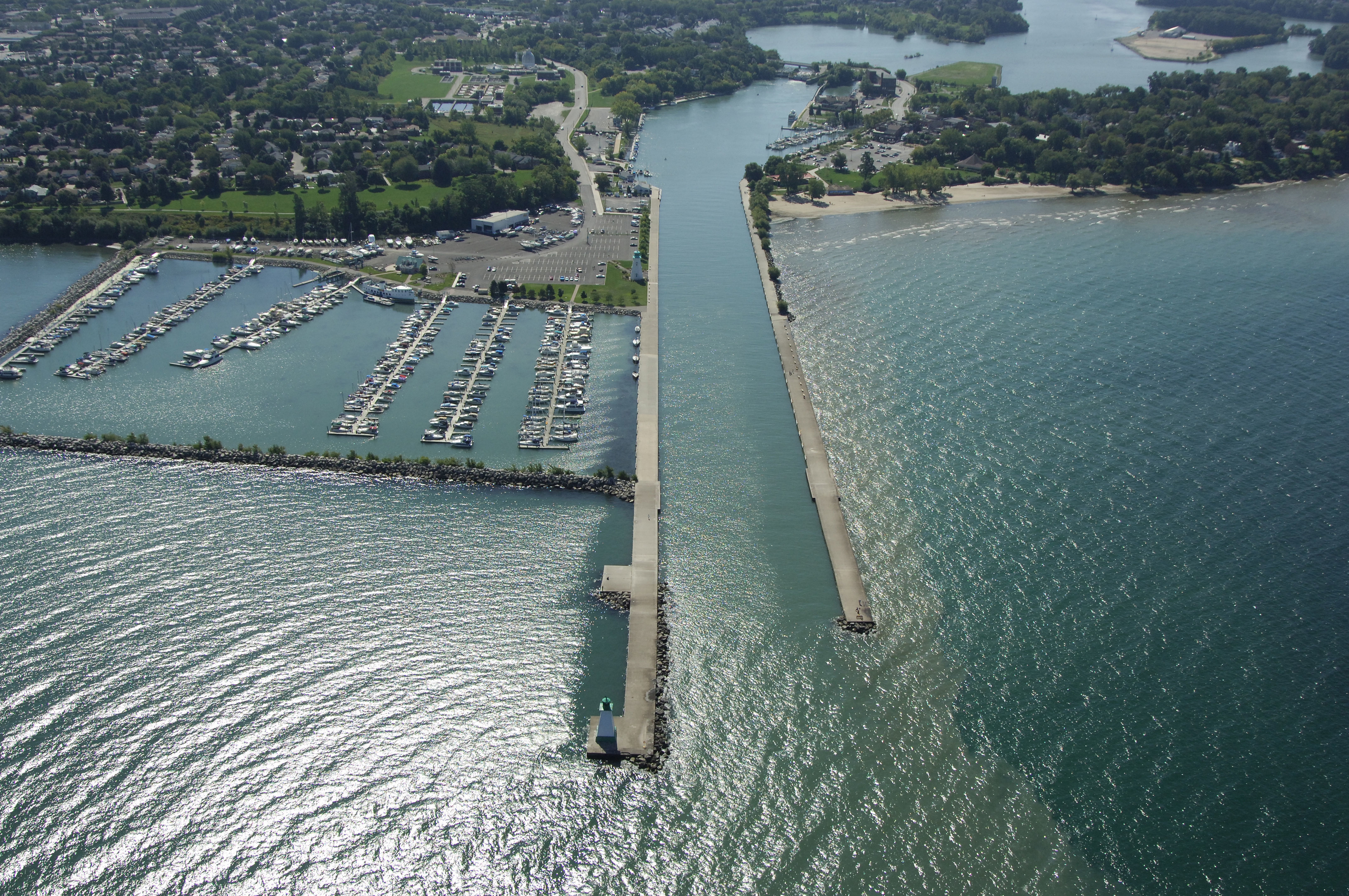
Martindale Pond next to Martindale Road in St. Catharines, Ontario

Martindale Pond in St. Catharines' Port Dalhousie is the site of the annual Royal Canadian Henley Regatta, a world-class event that brings over 3,000 athletes from various nations to the city. The site hosted the FISA World Rowing Championships in 1970 and in 1999. More recently, the World Master's Rowing Championship was held at the Martindale Pond in the summer of 2010, with $500,000 (~$719,514 in 2025) in improvements to the facility such as: a weed harvester, new docking and a new timing system. There are currently talks to bring the Canadian Rowing Hall of Fame to St. Catharines sometime in the near future. The pond is also home to the St. Catharines rowing club, Brock University rowing club, Ridley College rowing club and to the annual CSSRA Championships, which draws hundreds of high school athletes from Canada, the U.S. and Mexico. The Martindale Pond or Henley, continues to hold its world-renowned status as a major rowing venue in the world. The rowing event in the Pan American Games were held in St. Catharines in 2015. Several Olympic medallists in rowing are from St. Catharines, including Melanie Kok, Buffy Williams, and Dave Boyes. St Catharines hosted the 2024 World Rowing Championships. Makeda Harrison (5'5) is a high performance athlete from St Catharines. She won the U19 double sculls at the Royal Canadian Henley Regatta in 2022, represented Canada at the 2023 U19 World Rowing Championships, and now rows for the University of Pennsylvania.

=== Sailing ===
There are marinas at Port Dalhousie and Port Weller and a club that sails from Municipal Beach. The St. Catharines Marina is at Port Weller. The Port Dalhousie Pier Marina and the Port Dalhousie Yacht Club are at Port Dalhousie.

=== Track and Field ===
St. Catharines is well known for its strong track and field programs and large amount of local clubs. St. Catharines has four track locations at Brock University, Governor Simcoe Secondary School, Sir Winston Secondary School, and Collegiate Secondary School. The city has also produced multiple club team national champions in both the U18 division with Edge Sport winning in 2024, and the U16 division with Thorold Elite winning in 2024.

== Government ==
=== Municipal ===
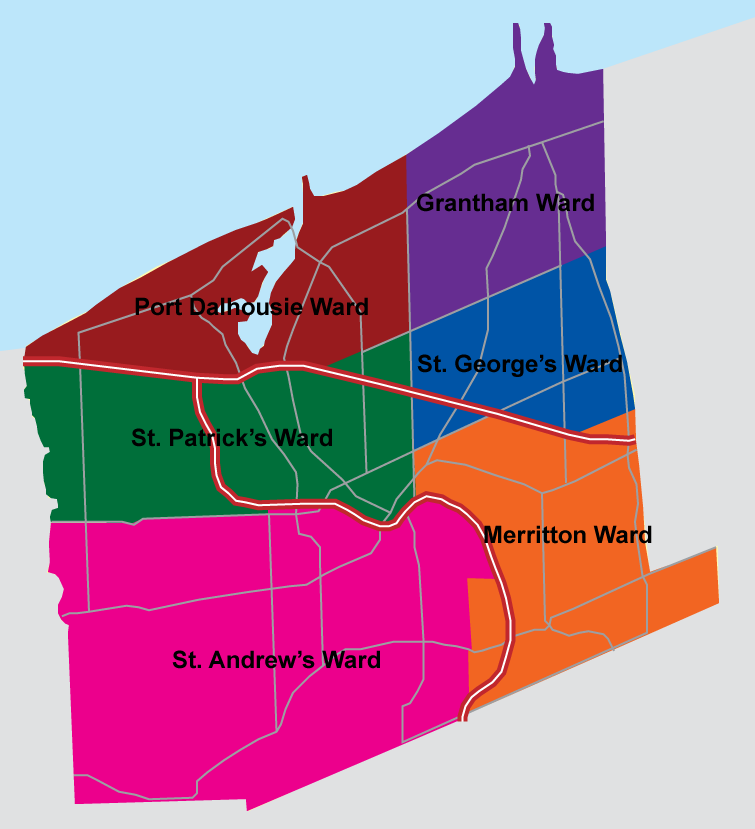
The six municipal wards of St. Catharines

St. Catharines is governed by a mayor and city council of twelve city councillors, with two councillors representing each of the six municipal wards in the city. A city councillor is also elected by the council as a whole to serve as deputy mayor, who only fills the role should the elected mayor not be available. St. Catharines City Council meets every Monday and is open to participation by the community. Matters put forward are voted on by members of city council; the mayor presides over council debate and serves very much like the speaker, and as a result only votes in the case of a tie. After 2006, municipal elections will be in November every four years rather than the previous three. Unlike most cities its size, city councillors only serve on a part-time basis and continue with their non-political careers in the community. Only the mayor is elected to a full-time position. St. Catharines City Hall is downtown on Church Street. Tim Rigby was the Mayor of St. Catharines from 1997 to 2006; Brian McMullan was elected to succeed Rigby on 13 November 2006, and was sworn in on 4 December. He was re-elected in October 2010. On 27 October 2014, Walter Sendzik was elected mayor of St. Catharines and assumed office in December 2014.

St. Catharines uses a council-manager government, and as a result a chief administrative officer (CAO) is appointed by council to oversee the day-to-day operations of the city and its departments. The CAO, in effect, is the highest ranking municipal civil servant and has authority over the spending of municipal tax dollars. The CAO advises council on policy matters and acts as liaison between the administrative staff and elected officials. Some of the CAOs duties include assisting in the creation of the municipal budget, and ensuring that municipal funds are spent in a responsible manner. Residents of St. Catharines also elect six regional councillors to the Niagara Regional Council on an at-large basis. Unlike many other regional municipalities in Ontario, regional councillors do not sit on city council and instead only represent at the regional level. Four school board trustees for the District School Board of Niagara representing St. Catharines and Niagara-on-the-Lake are elected, as well as three trustees for the Niagara Catholic District School Board, two for five of St. Catharines' wards, and one for Thorold and the Merriton Ward of St. Catharines. Regional councillors and school board trustees are elected at the same time, and on the same ballot, as the mayor and city councillors. St. Catharines has one of the lowest resident/representative ratios of any large city in Ontario. There are just under 7,000 people per elected municipal representative in St. Catharines, while Oshawa (a similar-sized city in Ontario) has one representative per 13,500 people. London, Ontario, has one representative per 30,500 people and Toronto has one representative per 111,774 people. There has been discussion regarding a modification of the city/regional council arrangement, with the possibility of reducing city council to six full-time representatives and having the six regional councillors serve on city council. While there is growing support in the business community for such an arrangement, city council has been unreceptive to such ideas.

=== Provincial ===
St. Catharines federal election results
Year	Liberal		Conservative		New Democratic		Green	
2021	38%	25,971	33%	22,587	21%	14,785	2%	1,318
2019	40%	28,141	32%	22,319	21%	14,951	6%	4,299

St. Catharines provincial election results
Year	PC		New Democratic		Liberal		Green	
2022	35%	18,062	39%	20,318	16%	8,455	4%	2,169
2018	34%	21,006	38%	23,014	23%	13,825	4%	2,321

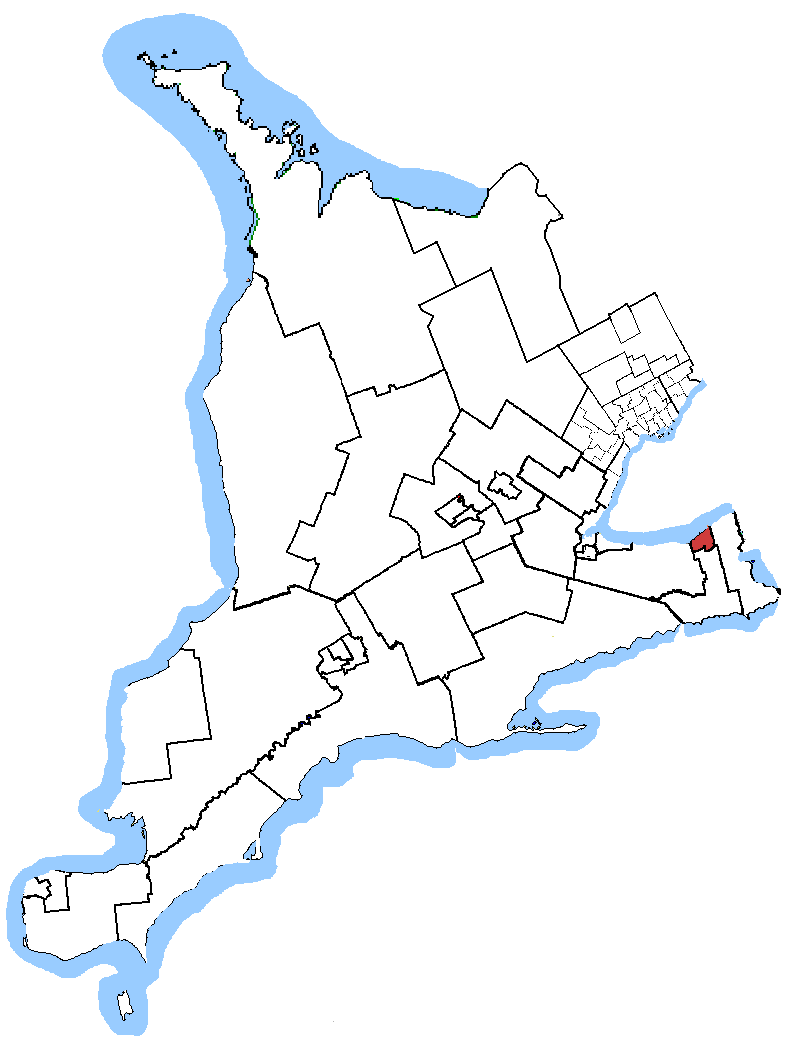
Map depicting the St. Catharines electoral district in 2005

At the provincial level, St. Catharines is well known for electing high-profile members of the Legislative Assembly of Ontario. Jim Bradley was the Member of Provincial Parliament for St. Catharines from 1977 until 2018 and was Ontario's longest serving MPP. Peter Kormos, who represented the southern portions of the city as part of the Welland riding, was a prominent Member of Provincial Parliament in the Ontario New Democratic Party caucus and served previously as Minister of Consumer and Commercial Relations in the Bob Rae government. From 1999 to 2003, during the premierships of Mike Harris and Ernie Eves, St. Catharines was the only large city in Ontario to not have at least one government member representing the city, as the Progressive Conservative-held ridings of Lincoln and St. Catharines—Brock were eliminated as a cost-saving measure. Robert Welch, a long-time Deputy Premier of Ontario, represented the now-eliminated Lincoln and St. Catharines—Brock ridings throughout the 1960s, 1970s and 1980s.

=== Federal ===
Federally, St. Catharines is one of the most bellwether of any riding in Canada, having only elected an opposition MP twice in its history. Chris Bittle is the current MP for St. Catharines and is a member of the Liberal Party of Canada, which currently forms Canada's government. Most federal representatives from St. Catharines have maintained a low profile on either the government or opposition backbenches. The exception was Gilbert Parent, who served as Speaker of the House for seven years while Jean Chrétien was Prime Minister.

=== Legal ===
St. Catharines is the judicial seat of the Niagara North Judicial District of Ontario, Central South Region, which represents the northern half of the Niagara Region equivalent to historic Lincoln County. The Superior Court of Justice is on Church Street across from City Hall. A satellite court is in Grimsby. The city forms "1 District" of the Niagara Regional Police Service. The NRPS headquarters are no longer on Church Street, having moved to Niagara Falls in a finally constructed new building with administrative offices and support services on Cushman Road.

== Transportation ==
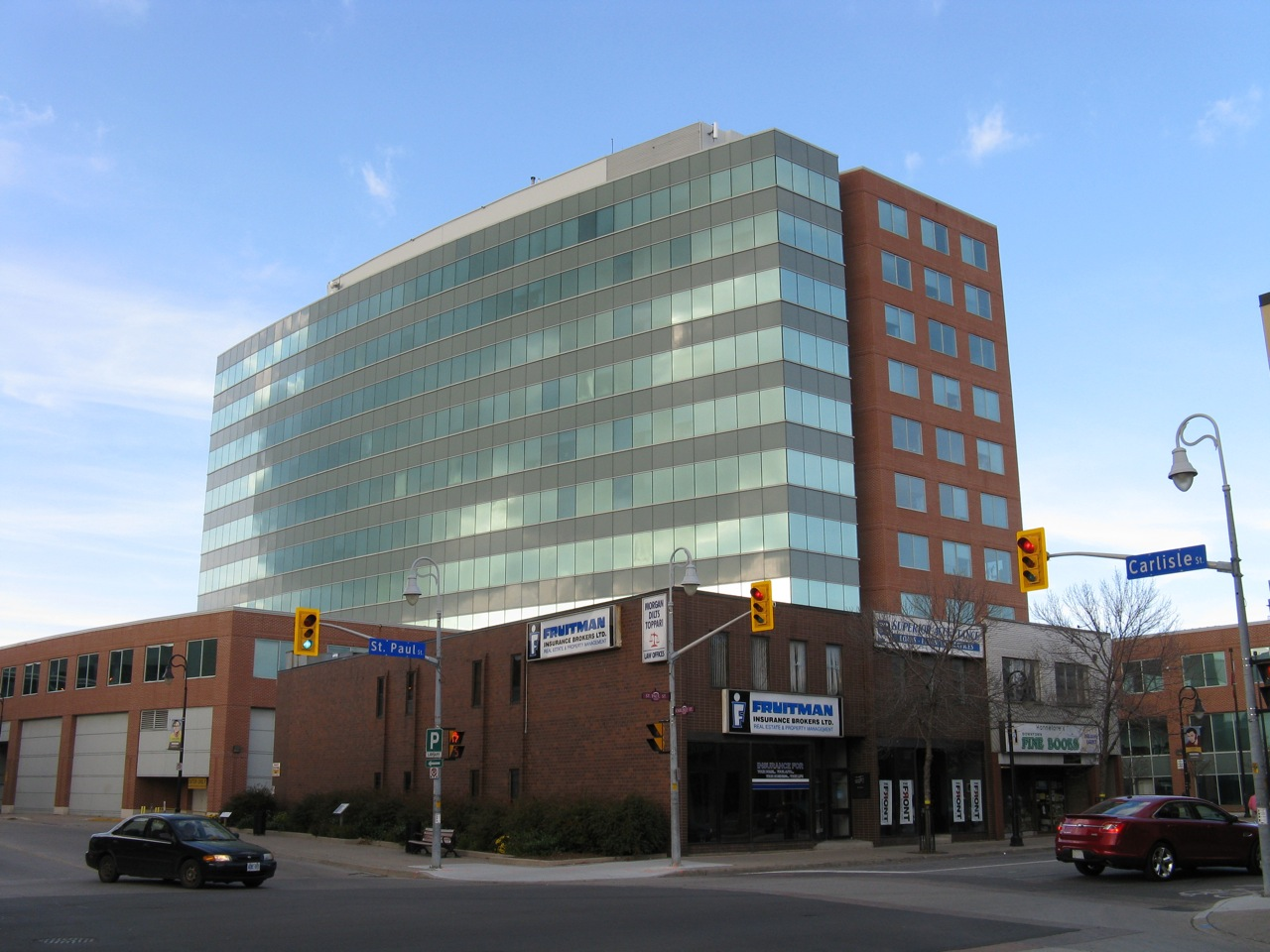
The Garden City Tower is the Ministry of Transportation headquarters, with the downtown transit terminal at ground level.

The most defining transportation icon of St. Catharines is the Welland Canal, a ship canal that runs 43.4 kilometres (27.0 mi), passing through the city. Four of its locks are within city boundaries. The canal allows shipping vessels to traverse the 99.5-metre (326.5 ft) drop in altitude from Lake Erie to Lake Ontario. The Garden City Skyway is a nearby bridge that facilitates vehicle traffic into the city.

The main access routes into and out of St. Catharines are served by two major freeways. The Queen Elizabeth Way runs east (at 15-Mile Creek) to west (at Garden City Skyway) and Highway 406 runs north (at QEW) to south (at St. David's Road). Prior to the construction of these freeways, St. Paul Street (former Highway 8, now Regional Road 81) and Hartzel Road (former Highway 58, now a city-maintained street) provided east–west and north–south access to the city.

Public transportation is served by the St. Catharines Transit Commission, which operates bus routes throughout the city and neighbouring Thorold. All major routes converge at the St. Catharines Bus Terminal, which is downtown within the headquarters of the Ontario Ministry of Transportation. The central station is also served by Coach Canada, with service to Toronto and Niagara Falls.

Though transportation by rail is becoming increasingly popular, the St. Catharines train station is largely under-utilized, with car and bus travel being the dominant forms of transportation for the city. The station is in its original building, outside the downtown core (because of issues involving the crossing of 12-Mile Creek). It is served daily by Via Rail and Amtrak trains connecting it to Toronto and New York City. The provincial and federal government recently committed $385 million each to GO Transit to aid in the development of their 10-Year Capital Expansion Plan, which includes an expansion bus line servicing the Niagara Region. Currently, regular GO Bus service exists to St. Catharines with a stop at Fairview Mall, allowing riders to travel either west toward Burlington or east toward Niagara Falls. A rail link with GO Transit operates during the summer months with plans for the city to be permanently linked via rail in the future.

St. Catharines/Niagara District Airport services general aviation as well as chartered jetliner flights. The airport is served by charter flights from FlyGTA Airlines and offers charter flights to Billy Bishop Toronto City Airport, Muskoka and Collingwood. It is near the city's east-end in neighbouring Niagara-on-the-Lake. Other airports surrounding the city include Niagara Falls/Niagara South Airport and Niagara Central Dorothy Rungeling Airport. The closest airports in proximity offering long-haul and international flights are John C. Munro Hamilton International Airport, Niagara Falls International Airport and Toronto Pearson International Airport.

St. Catharines had one of the first interurban electric streetcar routes, which ran between the city and Merritton and was eventually extended to Port Dalhousie in the north and Thorold to the south. Like most streetcar routes throughout the world, it was decommissioned in the 1960s, and the right-of-way has since been converted to parks and trails.

== Education ==
=== Secondary schools ===
The District School Board of Niagara (DSBN), the local public school board, manages 6 secondary schools within St. Catharines: DSBN Academy, Laura Secord Secondary School, Sir Winston Churchill, Governor Simcoe, St. Catharines Collegiate, and Eden. The opening of DSBN Academy was described as "Canada's most controversial pedagogical experiment in years" by the Globe and Mail, as the school was specifically geared towards low-income students. This raised fears about segregation in public education and causing low-income students to feel singled out. Proponents argued that the additional academic supports offered to disadvantaged students would raise their chances of attending post-secondary education. Governor Simcoe and Winston Churchill offer French immersion programs. Eden Secondary School, although it operates through the DSBN and receives public school funding, is also a Christian school.

The Niagara Catholic District School Board (NCDSB) manages and operates 3 Catholic secondary schools within the city: Holy Cross, Denis Morris Catholic High School, and Saint Francis.

Ridley College, near the city's downtown core in the Western Hill neighbourhood, is a private co-educational boarding and day school. It was established as a boys' school in 1889, and became co-educational in 1973.

=== Post-secondary ===
St. Catharines is home to Brock University (established 1964), a modern comprehensive university on the Niagara Escarpment. Concordia Lutheran Theological Seminary, a post graduate institution of the Lutheran Church–Canada, also operates there. A partnership between the university and the Ontario Grape and Wine Industry established the city as a centre for cool-climate grape and wine research.

The Michael G. DeGroote School of Medicine is a medical school operated by McMaster University with a campus in downtown St. Catharines. Prior to 2004, it was known as the McMaster University School of Medicine.

Although not a part of St. Catharines itself, there are nearby campuses for Niagara College in Niagara on the Lake and Welland. The college used to operate a horticulture-related campus in the city on 360 Niagara Street, across from Laura Secord Secondary School from the 1970s to 1990s.

== Media ==
=== Newspapers ===
- St. Catharines Standard (daily)
- Niagara This Week (community weekly)
- The Brock Press (student newspaper for Brock University)

=== Radio ===
- AM 610: CKTB, news /talk
- AM 1220: CFAJ, Oldies
- FM 97.7: CHTZ (HTZ FM), active rock
- FM 103.7: CFBU, Brock University campus radio
- FM 105.7: CHRE (Move), adult contemporary

=== Television ===
The Niagara region has no television service of its own. Stations broadcasting from Toronto, Hamilton and Buffalo are available over-the-air in the region, and the region has a local transmitter (CKVP-DT) rebroadcasting the Barrie CTV 2 station CKVR-DT. A local specialty news and information channel called Niagara News TV launched in February 2011, but ceased operations only 3 months later in April. In 2003, a local business consortium applied to the Canadian Radio-television and Telecommunications Commission (CRTC) for a licence to operate TV Niagara, a community television station in St. Catharines. The application was denied by the CRTC in 2005, citing concerns about the group's business plan and its dependence on gaining audience share in the Toronto market.

== Sister cities ==
- Port of Spain, Trinidad and Tobago

== See also ==
- List of cities in Ontario
- List of people from St. Catharines
- List of mayors of St. Catharines
