= Kilt and Clover =

- Kilt and Clover (December 2009)
- Interactive map of Kilt and Clover

Restaurant information
- Established: 1997 By David and Shannon Prentice
- Owner: Bryanne Connell
- Food type: Pub Grub
- Dress code: Casual
- Location: 17 Lock Street, Port Dalhousie, Ontario, L2N 5B6, Canada
- Coordinates: 43°12′09″N 79°16′01″W
- Website: kiltandclover.ca

The Kilt and Clover is a restaurant and bar located at 17 Lock Street in Port Dalhousie, Ontario, a district within the City of St. Catharines, Ontario on the shores of Lake Ontario. It is known for its annual frozen chicken chucking competition. The act of chicken chucking consists of pitching or sliding frozen chickens along the ice-covered Martindale Pond similar to curling and shuffleboard.

== Chicken chucking competition ==
A photograph of the event taken in 2008

Every January, the Kilt and Clover hosts the International Chicken Chucking Championships. The contest is a community event that fundraises for local charities including the community food bank. In 2009, the 9th annual Chicken Chucking with 38 teams raised over $2000.00 for charity. In past years, teams have come as far away as the United States and Europe. The 2010 event was followed with over $2,100.00 being raised for Hospice Niagara. That same year, the frozen chickens were used as dog food after the competition. As of 2019, the chickens were given away as tiger food.

The event has been criticized by At War For Animals, which is a local animal rights group. In 2020, phone calls and social media outreach were used by the group with the aim of preventing the event.

== Legal issues ==
In August 2006, the Kilt and Clover was charged under the Smoke Free Ontario Act when by-law officers observed four patrons smoking cigarettes on the uncovered west side of its patio. The Niagara Regional Government and the Ontario Ministry of Health argued that if a roof covers part of a patio, smoking is prohibited on the entire patio. In July 2007, a justice of the peace ruled in favour of the Kilt and Clover. The decision was appealed to the Ontario Court of Justice in February 2008. In a precedent-setting case, Justice Ann Watson ruled the pub was not breaking the law by allowing smoking on an uncovered portion of its wraparound patio.

On March 29, 2010, the Ontario Government passed Regulation 48/06, revamping the application of the Smoke Free Ontario Act to specifically address the prohibition of tobacco smoking on covered and partially covered restaurant and bar patios. This statutory change has overtaken the case law made by the Kilt and Clover.
