= Grantham Township =

Former township in Ontario, annexed by St. Catharines and Niagara on the Lake

Coordinates: 43°11′02″N 79°13′00″W

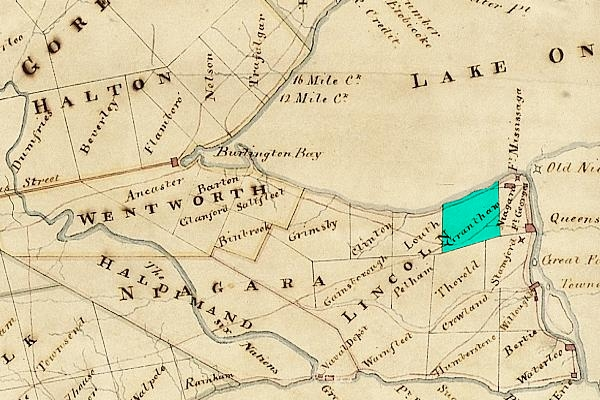
Grantham Township highlighted in green on an 1818 map.

Grantham Township is a former incorporated and now geographic township on the Niagara Peninsula in Upper Canada, later Ontario.

In 1961, part of it was amalgamated into the city of St. Catharines. In 1970, the remaining portion was amalgamated into the new Town of Niagara-on-the-Lake.

Grantham Township was originally called Township No. 3, while surveying was first taking place from 1787 until 1789. Every lot in this new township was 100 acres in size, for a total of 230 lots. The Butler's Rangers and United Empire Loyalist were some of the first residents; with both groups receiving the land for free.

== North End of St. Catharines ==
The North End of St. Catharines, Ontario, Canada is not a community per se, but rather describes the large swaths of land annexed by St. Catharines from Grantham Township. It is generally described as any area of the city north of the Queen Elizabeth Way, although areas north of the QEW but south of Welland Avenue were not part of the annex, and therefore not really part of The North End. Facer is also north of the QEW, but a distinct community of its own. The North End is home to the largest proportion of St. Catharines residents. It is primarily suburban in nature, although development ranges from high-density social housing projects to large upscale homes on the lakeshore. It was the location of explosive growth during the 1950s and 60s, which saw St. Catharines double in size in less than a 20-year period. These residents as well as visitors contribute to the use of 2 substantial marinas, 2 harbours and several launching ramps across the south shore of Lake Ontario.

== See also ==
- List of townships in Ontario
