= Coat of arms of St. Catharines =

The original coat of arms of the city of St. Catharines has become obscure with age; no information on who commissioned the arms, nor any information on who designed it, is available. Although the heraldic coat of arms is officially registered as a figure of St. Catharines, it is now rarely used as an identifying feature of the city, and has since been supplanted by the city logo. The heraldic coat of arms is, however, used on the city flag.

== Heraldic coat of arms ==
Coat of arms of St. Catharines
- Armiger: St. Catharines, Ontario
- Adopted: First known use 1851, granted 1976.
- Crest: Beehive
- Shield: Sailing Ship, Cornucopia, Millstone, Steamship with Sails
- Motto: INDUSTRY AND LIBERALITY

No record is readily available that provides a description of the present coat of arms; however, it is generally accepted that beehive alludes to industry and productivity. The motto on the scroll includes Industry, referring to all forms of economic activity and productive occupations. Liberality refers to being free and generous and without prejudice.

The sailing ship alludes to navigation. The forerunner to the first Welland Canal was the watercourse of the Twelve Mile Creek which enabled sailing ships to travel and be pulled by horses up the watercourse to the heart of the city. Subsequently, this early navigational course was developed into a canal and preceded three ship canals that followed a path through the city until the present-day fourth ship canal.

The cornucopia, commonly referred to as a "horn of plenty", pertains to the rich agriculture and fruitlands abundant in the area.

The millstone, (sometimes, and incorrectly, referred to as a grindstone) is symbolic of the grist mills and flour mills prevalent of an earlier era. These mills were built along the Twelve Mile Creek that provided an inexpensive and plentiful supply of water used to operate them.

The steamship with sails relates to the ship building in the area by Mr. Lewis Shikluna, a builder of many fine sailing vessels and credited with having helped to build a steamship that sailed the Atlantic Ocean to England. The early shipyards were located near the foot of Burgoyne Bridge; however, ship building has always been a thriving industry in the area, with shipyards at the former Port Dalhousie, on the Twelve Mile Creek, and the new modern facilities at the Port Weller Dry Docks.

When the coat of arms is used on stationery, it is a solid color of light blue on a white background. However, no authentic document is readily available that states which colors, if any, are to be used.

The earliest known record of the origin of the city of St. Catharines' coat of arms is from a by-law dated November 1851, with the coat of arms affixed thereto. It would be reasonable to assume that the coat of arms came into being about this time.

In 1976, the coat of arms was officially registered with the government of Canada, along with the city flower and city logo.

== Flag of St. Catharines ==
The current flag of St. Catharines

The flag of St. Catharines, Ontario, features the city's coat of arms on a white field, surrounded by green bars. The green colour symbolises the fruitlands and extensive gardens of the city.

== City logo ==
The St. Catharines logo (or seal) performs much the same function as a coat of arms. It is used as a means of identification or recognition, and has since supplanted the coat of arms for all official identification purposes.

The current logo of St. Catharines

In 1972, St. Catharines City Council adopted the design of the chevron as its official logo. The chevron design represents past and present characteristics of the city—the four blue lines symbolically represent the four Welland Canals; the green characterizes the valuable fruitlands. The green is especially significant since St. Catharines has long been known as "The Garden City".

In 2015, the City decided to modernize their logo with an updated Century Gothic font while still including the chevron.

== See also ==
- List of Canadian provincial and territorial symbols
- Heraldry
