= FirstOntario Performing Arts Centre =

Performing arts building in Canada

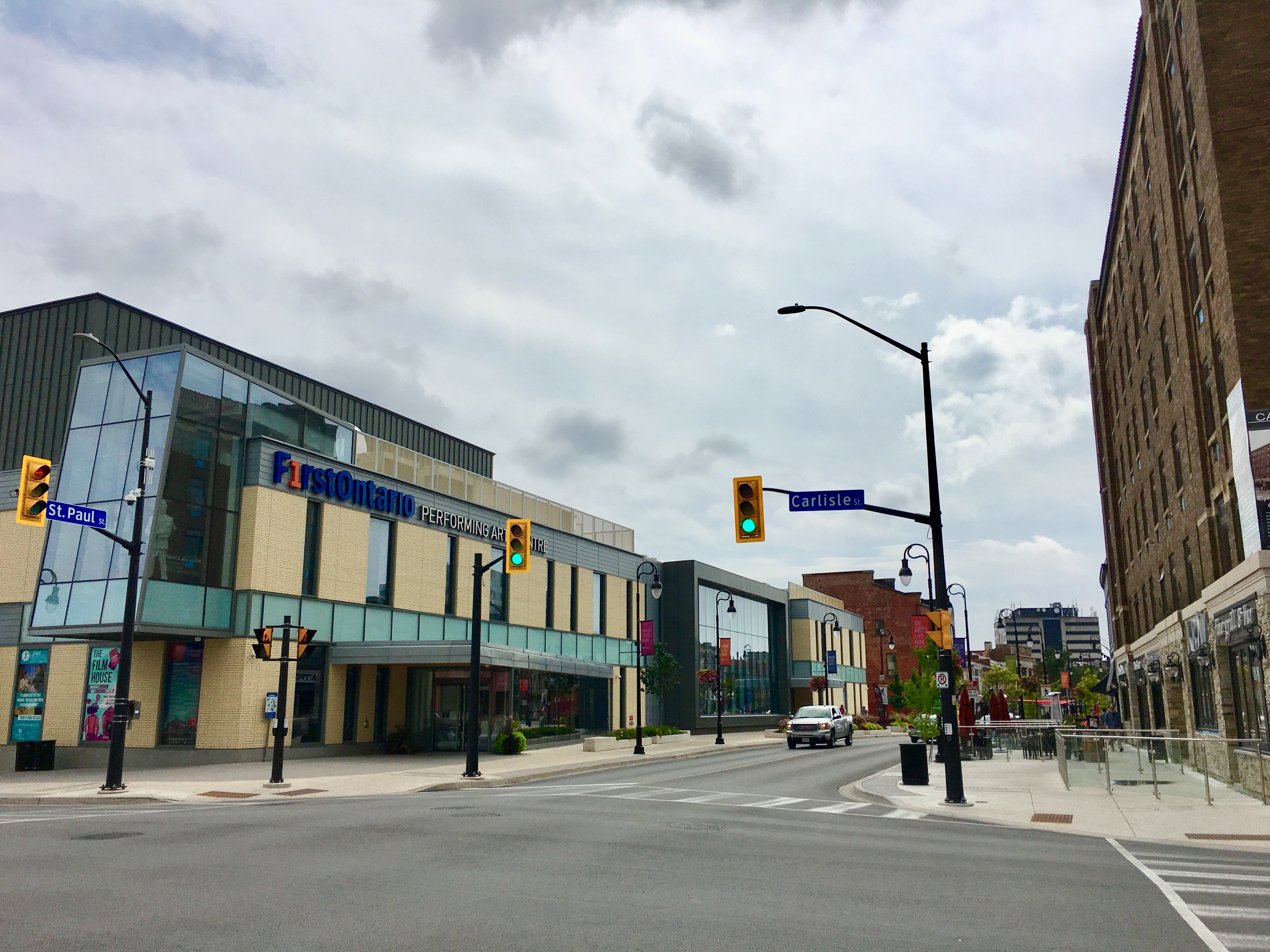
- The FirstOntario PAC, seen from St. Paul Street
- Interactive map of FirstOntario Performing Arts Centre
- Coordinates: 43.15857°N 79.24265°W

Construction
- Opened: November 15, 2015
- Architect: Diamond Schmitt Architects

Website
- www.firstontariopac.ca

The FirstOntario Performing Arts Centre is a 95,000-square-foot (8,800 m^{2}) cultural complex located in downtown St. Catharines, Ontario. It opened in 2015 as the result of a partnership between the City of St. Catharines and Brock University, which share the venue for production, performance and learning purposes. Designed by Diamond Schmitt Architects to host a variety of international and local performing artists, it comprises four separate venues: a 770-seat concert hall (Partridge Hall), 300-seat recital hall, 210-seat multi-purpose dance/theatre venue (Robertson Theatre), and the 199-seat Film House.

The creation of the centre spurred a cultural and economic renaissance in downtown St. Catharines along with its neighbouring Meridian Centre and Brock University's Marilyn I. Walker School of Fine and Performing Arts.
