= Suze Morrison =

Canadian politician

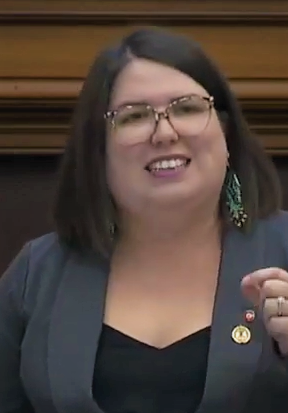

Member of the Ontario Provincial Parliament for Toronto Centre
- In office June 7, 2018 – May 3, 2022
- Preceded by: Glen Murray
- Succeeded by: Kristyn Wong-Tam

Personal details
- Born: February 4, 1988 (age 38) Parry Sound District, Ontario, Canada
- Party: New Democratic
- Education: University of Guelph-Humber
- Occupation: Communications consultant

Suze Morrison is a former Canadian politician is a former Canadian politician who served as an Ontario Member of Provincial Parliament between 2018 and 2022. A member of the Ontario New Democratic Party, she was elected to represented Toronto Centre and served in the 42nd Ontario Parliament as the Ontario New Democratic Party's Caucus Critic for Housing and Women's Issues. She declined to seek re-election in 2022 due to health reasons.

== Background ==
Of mixed European and Indigenous heritage, Morrison was born in the Parry Sound District before moving to Toronto in childhood. She took her Bachelor of Applied Arts degree in media studies from Guelph-Humber, and has worked in communications and public relations in the non-profit sector.

Morrison is a motorsports enthusiast, and competes in autocross events. She is a two-time winner of the Lorna Wilson Ladies Championship, which is awarded by the Western Ontario Sports Car Association.

In June 2021, Morrison came out as bisexual.

== Politics ==
According to Morrison, she got her first taste of political activism at the age of nine, when her single mother returned to school at the University of Toronto and got involved in campus activism. While residing in London, Ontario in the mid-2010s, Morrison served on London City Council's Diversity Inclusion and Anti-Oppression Advisory Committee from 2015 to 2017, when the committee secured a unanimous vote by the London City Council to demand London Police Services to end carding.

She returned to Toronto and moved into the Regent Park neighbourhood. She first became prominent within the local community as an advocate for community safety after witnessing the drive-by shooting of Lemard Champagnie in her neighbourhood in July 2017.

=== 2018 election campaign ===
In early 2018, she entered the contest for the Ontario NDP nomination in Toronto Centre and competed against two established NDP figures with deep roots in the riding's large LGBT community: Michael Erickson (a co-owner of the Glad Day Bookshop who stood against federal Liberal leader Michael Ignatieff in 2011 and posted the NDP's best results in the electoral district since the retirement of health minister Ruth Grier) and Kevin Beaulieu (a well known community figure as a former executive director of Pride Toronto and later became executive director of the Ontario NDP). Despite having only recently moved back to the city, Morrison leapfrogged her two rivals at the March 3rd nomination meeting held in the heart of Toronto gay village and won the nomination with party leader Andrea Horwath in attendance.

During the election campaign, she participated alongside Liberal MPP Steven Del Duca and Progressive Conservative MPP Lisa Thompson in Election Brew, a non-partisan event sponsored by Equal Voice and Labatt to increase citizen engagement in politics through a friendly competition to create craft beer brews; Morrison's beer, an India pale ale, won the competition.

Morrison was again victorious in the general election, securing 53.7% of the votes against her Liberal opponent David Morris' 27.2%. While Morrison was no doubt helped by the historic collapse of Liberal support and rode the NDP wave that swept all downtown Toronto ridings, Morrison's win in Toronto Centre was nonetheless a historically significant feat for the local NDP. Despite having much success at the municipal level and came in strong second on numerous occasions, no NDP candidate before Morrison had ever captured the seat either provincially or federally. The lasts person who represented substantial portion of the electoral district without carrying a Liberal or a Conservative banner was William Dennison, who was twice elected MPP for St. David in the 1940s to represent the area east of Shelbourne Street as candidate of the CCF, NDP's predecessor, before becoming the city's first NDP mayor. No third party candidate had ever represented the portion the electoral district that lies between Yonge Street and Shelbourne Street. In winning the downtown Toronto seat, Morrison overturned a 40-point advantage achieved by her Liberal predecessor, cabinet minister Glen Murray, when Premier Kathleen Wynne was at the height of her popularity, and secured a 34.5-point swing toward the NDP.

2018 Ontario general election: Toronto Centre
Party	Candidate	Votes	%	±%
New Democratic	Suze Morrison	23,688	53.66	+37.87
Liberal	David Morris	11,986	27.15	-31.07
Progressive Conservative	Meredith Cartwright	6,234	14.12	-4.43
Green	Adam Sommerfeld	1,377	3.12	-1.30
Libertarian	Judi Falardeau	371	0.84	-0.23
Special Needs	Dan King	117	0.27	-0.12
New People's Choice	Cameron James	110	0.25	
Stop the New Sex-Ed Agenda	Theresa Snell	102	0.23	
The People	Kevin Clarke	98	0.22	+0.06
Canadian Economic	Wanda Marie Fountain	65	0.15	
Total valid votes		44,148	100.0	
New Democratic gain from Liberal		Swing		+34.47
Source: Elections Ontario

== Member of the 42nd Ontario Parliament ==
Morrison was one of three MPPs of Indigenous heritage elected in 2018, alongside caucus colleagues Guy Bourgouin and Sol Mamakwa.

She was the second elected representative of Toronto Centre to any level of government to reside in the revitalized Regent Park neighborhood, after the late city councilor Pam McConnell. Coincidentally, the past NDP candidate that came the closest of winning the seat, Carolann Wright, was also a resident of Regent Park when she came within 75 votes of ousting Liberal Attorney General Ian Scott in 1990.

Morrison served as a member of the Standing Committee on Public Accounts, and as the official opposition critic for housing and women's issues.

=== Retirement ===
Morrison was diagnosed with endometriosis in 2019. She was however nominated in February 2021 by the NDP to contest the riding again. Citing her decision to undergo treatment, Morrison announced her decision to not seek re-election on April 4, 2022, about four weeks before the formal start of the 2022 Ontario general election campaign period. At a news conference held four days later, Morrison joined NDP leader Andrea Horwath in announcing local councilor Kristyn Wong-Tam as the new NDP candidate for Toronto Centre, bypassing a nomination contest.
