= Adam Giambrone =

Canadian politician (born 1977)

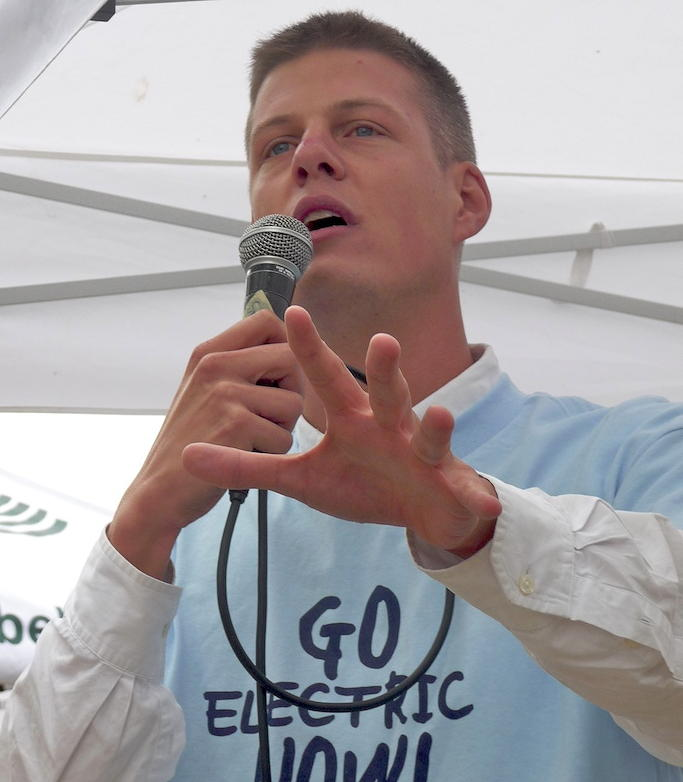
- Giambrone at the Human Train Protest, 26 September 2009

President of the New Democratic Party
- In office 2001–2006
- Preceded by: Dave MacKinnon
- Succeeded by: Anne McGrath

Toronto City Councillor for (Ward 18) Davenport
- In office December 1, 2003 – December 1, 2010
- Preceded by: Mario Silva
- Succeeded by: Ana Bailão

Chair of the Toronto Transit Commission
- In office December 1, 2006 – December 1, 2010
- Preceded by: Howard Moscoe
- Succeeded by: Karen Stintz

Personal details
- Born: March 8, 1977 (age 49) Toronto, Ontario, Canada
- Party: New Democratic Party
- Spouse: Sarah McQuarrie
- Profession: Politician, transportation analyst

Adam Giambrone (born March 8, 1977) is a Canadian transportation consultant and former politician who served on Toronto City Council from 2003 to 2010, representing Ward 18 Davenport. Giambrone served as the chair of the Toronto Transit Commission (TTC) from 2006 to 2010. Since leaving politics, Giambrone has worked in transportation consulting.

As chair of the Toronto Transit Commission, Giambrone oversaw the largest expansion of bus service in Toronto. Giambrone secured over $8 billion for the Transit City project new funding to build light rail into areas of the city currently not served by rapid transit. He was the 2008 recipient of Now Magazine's "Best City Politician" award.

== Early political career ==
At age 20, Giambrone ran for the NDP in the riding of Mount Royal in the 1997 federal election, in which he finished fifth out of six candidates.

Returning to Toronto, he took up employment at the Royal Ontario Museum. He ran for Toronto City Council in the southern Davenport ward against Mario Silva in the 2000 municipal election, losing 6,037 to 3,338.

=== Federal NDP President ===
At the federal NDP convention of 2001, Giambrone won a first two-year term as president of the party. The president of the NDP is the administrative chairperson of the party, chairing party conventions, councils and executive meetings. He became a frequent guest on television and figure in the news, and travelled the country extensively speaking to New Democrats.

At the 2003 convention at which Jack Layton was elected party leader, Giambrone won a second term against New Brunswick NDP leader Elizabeth Weir and a challenger from the NDP Socialist Caucus.

He announced in the summer of 2006 that he would not seek a third term as federal NDP president. Anne McGrath was elected to succeed him at the party convention in Quebec City.

== Toronto Councillor ==
Giambrone continued his attempts to win the south Davenport seat on Toronto city council. When Silva left city council and was elected a federal Liberal Member of Parliament in Davenport in the 2004 federal election, Giambrone ran to replace him in the 2003 municipal election. Giambrone defeated Ana Bailão, Silva's former assistant, by a 51-40 margin in a field of six candidates.

Toronto Council unanimously approved a September 2007 motion to allow the Toronto Parking Authority to proceed with a plan to expropriate the Matador, a famed Toronto music hall and cultural landmark. After considerable media attention, an organised group of citizens, including noted author Michael Ondaatje and folk singer Sylvia Tyson, lobbied Giambrone to successfully reverse the expropriation.

On May 7, 2009, Giambrone sent an email from his mobile phone, warning fellow councillor Cesar Palacio to "stop messing in my ward" or face "problems". Giambrone apologized for the "hastily composed" email when Palacio distributed copies to local media.

Shortly after taking office, he was appointed as a commissioner of the Toronto Transit Commission (TTC). He also served along with Greater Toronto Area mayors and regional chairs on the board of Metrolinx from its inception in 2006 until 2009.

During the TTC workers' wildcat strike on May 29, 2006, Giambrone was prominent in the media representing the TTC's position as commission chair Howard Moscoe was out of town. After being re-elected in the 2006 municipal election, taking almost 67 per cent of the vote in his ward, Giambrone was elected as Chair of the Toronto Transit Commission on December 6, 2006.

=== TTC Chairman ===
As chair of the TTC, Giambrone oversaw a large expansion of bus service in Toronto, which saw then-record ridership, and the launch of a new, improved TTC website electronic service advisories, as well as next vehicle arrival information systems, and an affinity discount program for the Metropass. Some of these ideas were discussed at Transit Camp, a community consultation early in his term as chair.

Giambrone also established the station modernization and station renaissance renewal programs for TTC subway stations, the latter in conjunction with the Toronto Community Foundation. Giambrone also started a program to install bicycle racks on all TTC buses. although naysayers complained that they were not worth the expense and seldom used.

Giambrone together with Mayor David Miller unveiled Transit City, a $10 billion expansion of light rail into neighborhoods and areas not served by rapid transit, and reaching into the GTA. Transit City calls for 120 kilometres of electric light rail along seven new routes. Premier Dalton McGuinty announced funding for Transit City as a component of its MoveOntario 2020 plan on June 15, 2007. Transit City was also included in Metrolinx's "Big Move" funding plan when it was released on November 27, 2008.

On April 24, 2009, Giambrone announced that the TTC had opted to replace its aging fleet of Canadian Light Rail Vehicles and Articulated Light Rail Vehicles with 204 new streetcars, procured competitively from Bombardier Transportation. New streetcars began to enter service in 2012. The deal, valued at more than $1.2 billion, called for the streetcars to be manufactured in Thunder Bay.

Giambrone announced the launch of the TTC's Transit City Bus Plan on August 21, 2009. The plan took the 'network approach' of the Transit City Light Rail Plan and applied it to buses, creating a network of 10-minute service on 21 of its 139 bus routes which began in the fall of 2010.

Giambrone appeared on CP24's monthly television show called On The Rocket in which he rides a streetcar and discusses daily transit operations, improvements, plans and concerns.

In the wake of a sex scandal (see 2010 mayoral campaign), fellow councilor Brian Ashton called for Giambrone to resign as chairman of the TTC, which had been beset by bad publicity. Ashton said "The TTC is under serious assault around issues of customer relations and performance. The union is now fragmented from the management. I think his moral authority has been totally debased and undermined," said Ashton. "I think mentally he's going to be distracted by both his mayoralty bid and this sex scandal. His ability to come to terms with the TTC issues is tremendously weakened." He did not step down, but also did not seek re-election and so his term as TTC chair ended in December, 2010.

=== 2010 mayoral campaign ===
Giambrone launched a campaign for Mayor of Toronto in the 2010 municipal election to succeed David Miller on February 1, 2010, ending it on February 10, 2010. Before Giambrone entered the race, two polls showed him in second place among declared mayoral candidates, though he also had a high unfavorability rating of 40 per cent. He remained a leading candidate until February 9, when the Toronto Star published an interview with undergraduate student Kristen Lucas, who revealed that she had a past sexual relationship with Giambrone, including acts in his city office. Giambrone apologized for an "inappropriate relationship" and admitted to intimate relationships with women other than his live-in partner, to whom he is now married. In the immediate wake of the revelations, Giambrone initially pledged to continue with his mayoral campaign, but announced his withdrawal the following day.

Giambrone did not run for re-election to his council seat, and his executive assistant Kevin Beaulieu was defeated by Ana Bailão. Giambrone claimed French lessons as a city council expense, as he was Toronto's representative to the Francophone Association of Municipalities of Ontario and does interviews with francophone media.

=== Scarborough—Guildwood provincial by-election ===
On July 5, 2013, Giambrone resigned as co-chair of the candidate search committee and announced his candidacy for the Ontario New Democratic Party's nomination for the August 1, 2013 provincial by-election in Scarborough—Guildwood; he won the nomination on July 7 over community activist Amarjeet Chhabra, reportedly by a margin of 18 to 14.

Giambrone's nomination was the subject of a threatened legal challenge by Chhabra who alleged that 12 of the 32 individuals who voted at the nomination meeting were not on party membership lists and may not have been entitled to vote according to party rules that require an individual to be a party member for 30 days and to live in the riding in order to be able to cast a ballot. Chhabra said she would not proceed with her attempt to force a new nomination meeting due to the tight time frame before the election.

Giambrone came in third place with 28 per cent of the vote, an improvement of 9 per cent from the previous NDP candidate in the 2011 provincial election.

== Transportation career ==
He has been a transit consultant for clients such as the city of Milwaukee and the Société de transport de Montréal.

In 2016, Mayor of New York City Bill de Blasio appointed Giambrone to head up the Brooklyn–Queens Connector (BQX) streetcar project.

Giambrone has since left the BQX project to head up transportation infrastructure projects in Saudi Arabia.

== Personal life ==
Giambrone has participated in excavations in Sudan, Tunisia, Libya, and Yemen.

He speaks English, French, and Arabic fluently. He is of Italian-American ancestry; his father moved to Canada to avoid the Vietnam War.

Since leaving municipal politics, Giambrone has been a commentator and panelist on the Sun News Network and was a columnist for Now, an alternative weekly newspaper.

== Election results ==
Results for the 1997 federal campaign in the riding of Mount Royal:

1997 Canadian federal election
Party	Candidate	Votes	%	±%
Liberal	Sheila Finestone	30,115	62.3%	-20.6%
Independent	Howard Galganov	10,090	20.9%	
Progressive Conservative	Carolyn Steinman	5,006	10.3%	+4.6%
Bloc Québécois	Jacques Thibaudeau	1,981	4.1%	-2.9%
New Democratic	Adam Giambrone	966	2.0%	+0.3%
Natural Law	Ena Kahn	211	0.4%	-0.2%
Total valid votes		48,369	100.0%	

Toronto municipal election results, 2000, Ward 18 - Davenport
Candidate	Votes	%
Mario Silva	6,037	61.0%
Adam Giambrone	3,338	33.7%
Janice Cudlip	319	3.2%
Richard Kankis	206	2.1%

Toronto municipal election results, 2003, Ward 18 - Davenport
Candidate	Votes	%
Adam Giambrone	5,797	51.5%
Ana Bailão	4,537	40.3%
Hortencia Fotopoulos	386	3.4%
Nha Le	234	2.1%
Cynamin Maxwell	155	1.4%
Ana Salaverry-Chuquihuara	141	1.2%

Toronto municipal election results, 2006, Ward 18 - Davenport
Candidate	Votes	%
Adam Giambrone	6,025	66.9%
Simon Wookey	2,089	23.2%
Jim McMillan	292	3.2%
Lloyd Ferguson	262	2.9%
Nha Le	251	2.8%
Jim Rawling	87	1.0%

Ontario provincial by-election, Scarborough-Guildwood: August 1, 2013 Resignation of Margarett Best
Party	Candidate	Votes	%	±%
Liberal	Mitzie Hunter	8,852	35.83	-13.10
Progressive Conservative	Ken Kirupa	7,606	30.79	+2.14
New Democratic	Adam Giambrone	7,010	28.37	+8.95
Green	Nick Leeson	532	2.15	+0.86
Independent	Jim Hamilton	195	0.79	-
Special Needs	Danish Ahmed	185	0.75	-
Libertarian	Heath Thomas	118	0.48	-0.80
Family Coalition	Raphael Rosch	104	0.42	-
Freedom	Matthew Oliver	80	0.32	-0.10
People's	Bill Rawdah	24	0.10	-
Total valid votes		24,706	100.0	
Turnout		24,706	36.19	
Liberal hold		Swing	-7.62	
