= Ontario New Democratic Party candidates in the 2003 Ontario provincial election =

The New Democratic Party of Ontario is one of three major political parties in Ontario, Canada. It governed the province from 1990 to 1995, and is currently the third-largest party in the Legislative Assembly of Ontario.

The NDP led at the time by Howard Hampton ran a full state of 103 candidates in the 2003 Ontario provincial election, seven of whom were elected. Three more candidates were elected in by-elections held in 2004, March 2006 and February 2007. Several NDP candidates have their own biography pages. Information about other candidates may be found here.

== Central Ontario ==
Riding	Candidate's Name	Notes	Residence	Occupation	Votes	%	Rank
Barrie—Simcoe—Bradford	John Thomson				5,641	9.26	3rd
Dufferin—Peel—Wellington—Grey	Mitchel Healey				3,148	6.10	4th
Durham	Teresa Williams				6,274	12.41	3rd
Haliburton—Victoria—Brock	Earl Manners				7,884	15.39	3rd
Northumberland	Murray Weppler	Member of Plainville Town Council (1997–2000)			5,210	11.51	3rd
Peterborough	Dave Nickle	ONDP candidate for Peterborough in the 1999 provincial election			9,796	17.80	3rd
Simcoe—Grey	Leo Losereit	Member of Adjala-Tosorontio Town Council (2000–2003)	Adjala-Tosorontio	Agricultural professional	5,032	9.92	3rd
Simcoe North	John Niddery				5,515	10.87	3rd

== Eastern Ontario/Ottawa ==
Riding	Candidate's Name	Notes	Residence	Occupation	Votes	%	Rank
Glengarry—Prescott—Russell	Guy Belle-Isle				2,544	5.80	3rd
Hastings—Frontenac—Lennox and Addington	Ross Sutherland			Nurse	4,286	10.32	3rd
Kingston and the Islands	Janet Collins				5,514	11.51	3rd
Lanark—Carleton	Jim Ronson				3,554	5.87	3rd
Leeds—Grenville	Steve Armstrong	President of Communications, Energy and Paperworkers Union Local 28-O	Brockville	Chemical worker	2,469	5.61	3rd
Nepean—Carleton	Liam McCarthy				3,828	6.54	3rd
Ottawa Centre	Jeff Atkinson		Ottawa	Union official (CLC)	11,362	22.98	2nd
Ottawa—Orléans	Ric Dagenais			Union official (Canadian Union of Public Employees)	2,778	5.53	3rd
Ottawa South	James MacLaren				4,306	9.03	3rd
Ottawa Vanier	Joseph Zabrowski				6,507	15.70	3rd
Ottawa West—Nepean	Marlene Rivier	President of Ontario Public Service Employees Union Local 479	Britannia, Ottawa	Psychologist / Union leader	4,099	8.34	3rd
Prince Edward—Hastings	Jodie Jenkins				3,377	8.45	3rd
Renfrew—Nipissing—Pembroke	Felicite Stairs				5,092	11.66	3rd
Stormont—Dundas—Charlottenburgh	Matt Sumegi				1,639	4.29	4th

== Greater Toronto Area ==
Riding	Candidate's Name	Notes	Residence	Occupation	Votes	%	Rank
Beaches—East York	Michael Prue	Member of Provincial Parliament for Beaches—East York (2001–2014); Member of Toronto City Council for Ward 32 Beaches—East York (1998–2001); Mayor of East York (1993–1997)		Civil servant	21,239	50.90	1st
Bramalea—Gore—Malton—Springdale	Cesar Martello		Brampton	Student (York University)	4,931	11.65	3rd
Brampton Centre	Kathy Pounder			Urban planner	4,827	12.60	3rd
Brampton West—Mississauga	Chris Moise	ONDP candidate for Oak Ridges in the 1999 provincial election			5,103	8.15	3rd
Burlington	David Laird		Burlington	Child protection worker	3,832	8.22	3rd
Davenport	Jordan Berger	Husband of Marit Stiles	Toronto	Manager	7,243	27.33	2nd
Don Valley East	Murphy Browne				3,058	8.14	3rd
Don Valley West	Ali Naqvi		Toronto	Consultant	2,540	5.69	3rd
Eglinton—Lawrence	Robin Alter				4,351	10.43	3rd
Etobicoke Centre	Margaret Anne McHugh			Healthcare manager	3,400	7.61	3rd
Etobicoke—Lakeshore	Irene Jones	Member of Toronto City Council for Ward 6 Etobicoke-Lakeshore (2000–2003); Member of Toronto City Council for Ward 2 Lakeshore Queensway (1998–2000); Member of Etobicoke City Council for Ward 1 (1988–1997)	Mimico		8,952	20.09	3rd
Etobicoke North	Kuldip Singh Sodhi				3,516	11.35	3rd
Halton	Jay Jackson	ONDP candidate for Halton in the 1999 provincial election			5,587	8.01	3rd
Markham	Janice Hagan	NDP candidate for Markham in the 2000 federal election ONDP candidate for Markham in the 1999 provincial election		Teacher	2,679	5.08	3rd
Mississauga Centre	Michael Miller				3,237	8.32	3rd
Mississauga East	Michael Hancock				2,479	7.23	3rd
Mississauga South	Ken Cole				3,606	9.18	3rd
Mississauga West	Arif Raza				4,196	7.64	3rd
Oak Ridges	Pamela Courtot		Stouffville	Small business owner	4,464	6.46	3rd
Oakville	Anwar Naqvi		Oakville	Lawyer	2,858	6.35	3rd
Oshawa	Sid Ryan	President of CUPE Ontario (1992–2009)	Whitby	Union leader	13,547	34.71	2nd
Parkdale—High Park	Margo Duncan				6,275	15.77	3rd
Pickering—Ajax—Uxbridge	Vern Edwards				3,690	6.76	3rd
St. Paul's	Julian Heller		Toronto	Lawyer	6,740	14.83	3rd
Scarborough—Agincourt	Stacy Douglas				2,209	5.86	3rd
Scarborough Centre	Michael Laxer	NDP candidate for Scarborough—Agincourt in the 2000 federal election		Small business owner	3,653	8.77	3rd
Scarborough East	Gary Dale		Toronto	Consultant	5,250	12.40	3rd
Scarborough—Rouge River	Jean-Paul Yovanoff			Marketing professional	2,246	5.98	3rd
Scarborough Southwest	Barbara Warner	Daughter of David William Warner			6,688	17.94	3rd
Thornhill	Laurie Orrett			Executive assistant	2,616	5.73	3rd
Toronto Centre—Rosedale	Gene Lara		St. James Town, Toronto	Social service agency director	9,112	20.14	3rd
Toronto—Danforth	Marilyn Churley	Member of Provincial Parliament for Toronto—Danforth (1999–2005); Member of Provincial Parliament for Riverdale (1990–1999); Member of Toronto City Council (1988–1990)	Toronto		18,253	47.14	1st
Trinity—Spadina	Rosario Marchese	Member of Provincial Parliament for Trinity—Spadina (1999–2014); Member of Provincial Parliament for Fort York (1990–1999)	Toronto	Teacher	19,268	47.51	1st
Vaughan—King—Aurora	Michael Seaward	ONDP candidate for Vaughan—King—Aurora in the 1999 provincial election			4,697	7.14	3rd
Whitby—Ajax	Dan Edwards				5,155	9.1	3rd
Willowdale	Yvonne Bob	NDP candidate for Willowdale in the 2000 federal election		Civil servant	3,084	6.64	3rd
York Centre	Matthew Norrish				3,494	11.04	3rd
York North	Sylvia Gerl		Keswick	Women's shelter worker	4,029	7.76	3rd
York South—Weston	Brian Donlevy				6,247	19.29	2nd
York West	Garth Bobb				3,954	17.02	2nd

== Hamilton/Niagara ==
Riding	Candidate's Name	Notes	Residence	Occupation	Votes	%	Rank
Ancaster—Dundas—Flamborough—Aldershot	Kelly Hayes				5,666	11.70	3rd
Brant	David Noonan				5,262	11.84	3rd
Erie—Lincoln	Julius Antal				3,950	9.41	3rd
Hamilton East	Bob Sutton				9,035	29.42	2nd
Hamilton Mountain	Chris Charlton	Candidate for Ward 7 in the 2000 Hamilton municipal election ONDP candidate for Hamilton Mountain in the 1999 provincial election NDP candidate for Hamilton Mountain in the 1997 federal election	Hamilton		12,017	26.46	2nd
Hamilton West	Roy Adams		Hamilton	Professor at McMaster University	13,468	34.50	2nd
Niagara Centre	Peter Kormos	Member of Provincial Parliament for Niagara Centre (1999–2007); Member of Provincial Parliament for Welland—Thorold (1988–1999)	Welland	Lawyer	23,289	49.64	1st
Niagara Falls	Claude Sonier				4,962	12.30	3rd
St. Catharines	John Bacher				3,944	8.95	3rd
Stoney Creek	Lorrie McKibbon				5,419	10.71	3rd

== Northern Ontario ==
Riding	Candidate's Name	Notes	Residence	Occupation	Votes	%	Rank
Algoma—Manitoulin	Peter Denley		Echo Bay	Newspaper columnist/postal worker	9,459	31.71	2nd
Kenora—Rainy River	Howard Hampton	Leader of the Ontario New Democratic Party (1996–2009); Member of Provincial Parliament for Kenora—Rainy River (1999–2011); Member of Provincial Parliament for Rainy River (1987–1999)		Lawyer	15,666	60.12	1st
Nickel Belt	Shelley Martel	Member of Provincial Parliament for Nickel Belt (1999–2007); Member of Provincial Parliament for Sudbury East (1987–1999)		Insurance professional	16,567	46.52	1st
Nipissing	Terry O'Connor		North Bay	Chaplain	2,613	7.23	3rd
Parry Sound—Muskoka	Jo-Anne Boulding		Bracebridge	Lawyer	3,838	9.92	3rd
Sault Ste. Marie	Tony Martin	Member of Provincial Parliament for Sault Ste. Marie (1990–2003)	Sault Ste. Marie		11,379	32.37	2nd
Sudbury	Harvey Wyers				4,999	14.00	3rd
Thunder Bay—Atikokan	John Rafferty		Thunder Bay	Small business owner	6,582	21.62	2nd
Thunder Bay—Superior North	Bonnie Satten				4,548	15.02	2nd
Timiskaming—Cochrane	Ben Lefebvre				5,741	18.48	3rd
Timmins—James Bay	Gilles Bisson	Member of Provincial Parliament for Timmins—James Bay (1999–2018); Member of Provincial Parliament for Cochrane South (1990–1999)		Union organizer	14,941	49.70	1st

== Southwestern Ontario ==
Riding	Candidate's Name	Notes	Residence	Occupation	Votes	%	Rank
Bruce—Grey—Owen Sound	Colleen Purdon	NDP candidate for Bruce—Grey in the 1997 federal election			4,159	9.28	3rd
Cambridge	Pam Wolf		Cambridge	Teacher	8,513	18.09	3rd
Chatham-Kent—Essex	Derry McKeever				2,893	7.45	3rd
Elgin—Middlesex—London	Bryan Bakker			Filmmaker	4,063	9.35	3rd
Essex	Pat Hayes	Mayor of Lakeshore (1997–2003); Member of Provincial Parliament for Essex—Kent (1990–1995); Member of Provincial Parliament for Essex North (1985–1987)	Lakeshore	Occupational health and safety professional	12,614	27.78	2nd
Guelph—Wellington	James Valcke				6,745	12.06	3rd
Haldimand—Norfolk—Brant	Prue Steiner				4,720	10.82	3rd
Huron—Bruce	Grant Robertson		Paisley	Ontario director of the National Farmers Union	4,973	11.46	3rd
Kitchener Centre	Ted Martin				6,781	15.80	3rd
Kitchener—Waterloo	Dan Lajoie				6,084	10.94	3rd
Lambton—Kent—Middlesex	Joyce Jolliffe		Strathroy		4,523	11.01	3rd
London—Fanshawe	Irene Mathyssen	Member of Provincial Parliament for Middlesex (1990–1995)		Teacher	12,051	31.05	2nd
London North Centre	Rebecca Coulter				11,414	24.53	3rd
London West	Patti Dalton				7,403	14.89	3rd
Oxford	Shawn Rouse				5,318	12.56	3rd
Perth—Middlesex	Jack Verhulst				4,703	11.81	3rd
Sarnia—Lambton	Glenn Sonier				6,482	16.95	3rd
Waterloo—Wellington	Richard Walsh-Bowers	NDP candidate for Kitchener—Waterloo in the 2000 federal election ONDP candidate for Waterloo—Wellington in the 1999 provincial election		Professor at Wilfrid Laurier University	3,970	8.62	3rd
Windsor—St. Clair	Madeleine Crnec				10,433	29.10	2nd
Windsor West	Yvette Blackburn				7,383	20.98	2nd

== By-elections ==
Riding	Candidate's Name	Notes	Residence	Occupation	Votes	%	Rank
Burlington	Cory Judson						
Markham	Janice Hagan						
Nepean—Carleton	Laurel Gibbons						
Toronto—Danforth	Peter Tabuns						
Whitby—Ajax	Julie Gladman						
York South—Weston	Paul Ferreira						
