= University—Rosedale (provincial electoral district) =

Provincial electoral district in Ontario, Canada

Coordinates: 43.671°N 79.394°W

Ontario electoral district
- University-Rosedale in relation to the other Toronto ridings (2015 boundaries)

Provincial electoral district
- Legislature: Legislative Assembly of Ontario
MPP
Jessica Bell
New Democratic
- District created: 2015
- First contested: 2018
- Last contested: 2025

Demographics
- Population (2016): 104,315
- Electors (2018): 88,097
- Area (km²): 14
- Pop. density (per km²): 7,451.1
- Census division: Toronto
- Census subdivision: Toronto

University—Rosedale is a provincial electoral district in Toronto, Ontario, Canada. It elects one member to the Legislative Assembly of Ontario. This riding was created in 2015. The Ontario Legislative Building is located within this district.

== Members of Provincial Parliament ==
University—Rosedale
Assembly	Years	Member	Party
Riding created from Trinity—Spadina and Toronto Centre
42nd	2018–2022	Jessica Bell	New Democratic
43rd	2022–2025	Jessica Bell	New Democratic
44th	2025–present	Jessica Bell	New Democratic

== Election results ==
=== 2025 election ===
Winning party in each polling division of University—Rosedale at the 2025 Ontario general election

2025 Ontario general election
Party	Candidate	Votes	%	±%	Expenditures
New Democratic	Jessica Bell	17,912	45.50	+7.95	$107,466
Liberal	Pam Jeffery	12,098	30.73	+3.37	$56,489
Progressive Conservative	Sydney Pothakos	7,829	19.89	+2.31	$21,046
Green	Ignacio Mongrell	1,227	3.12	–12.76	$34,382
New Blue	Dylan Harris	299	0.76	–0.50	$60
Total valid votes/expense limit		39,365	99.26	–0.23	$135,985
Total rejected, unmarked, and declined ballots		295	0.74	+0.23	
Turnout		39,660	45.37	+2.17	
Eligible voters		87,418			
New Democratic hold		Swing		+2.29	
Source: Elections Ontario

=== 2022 election ===
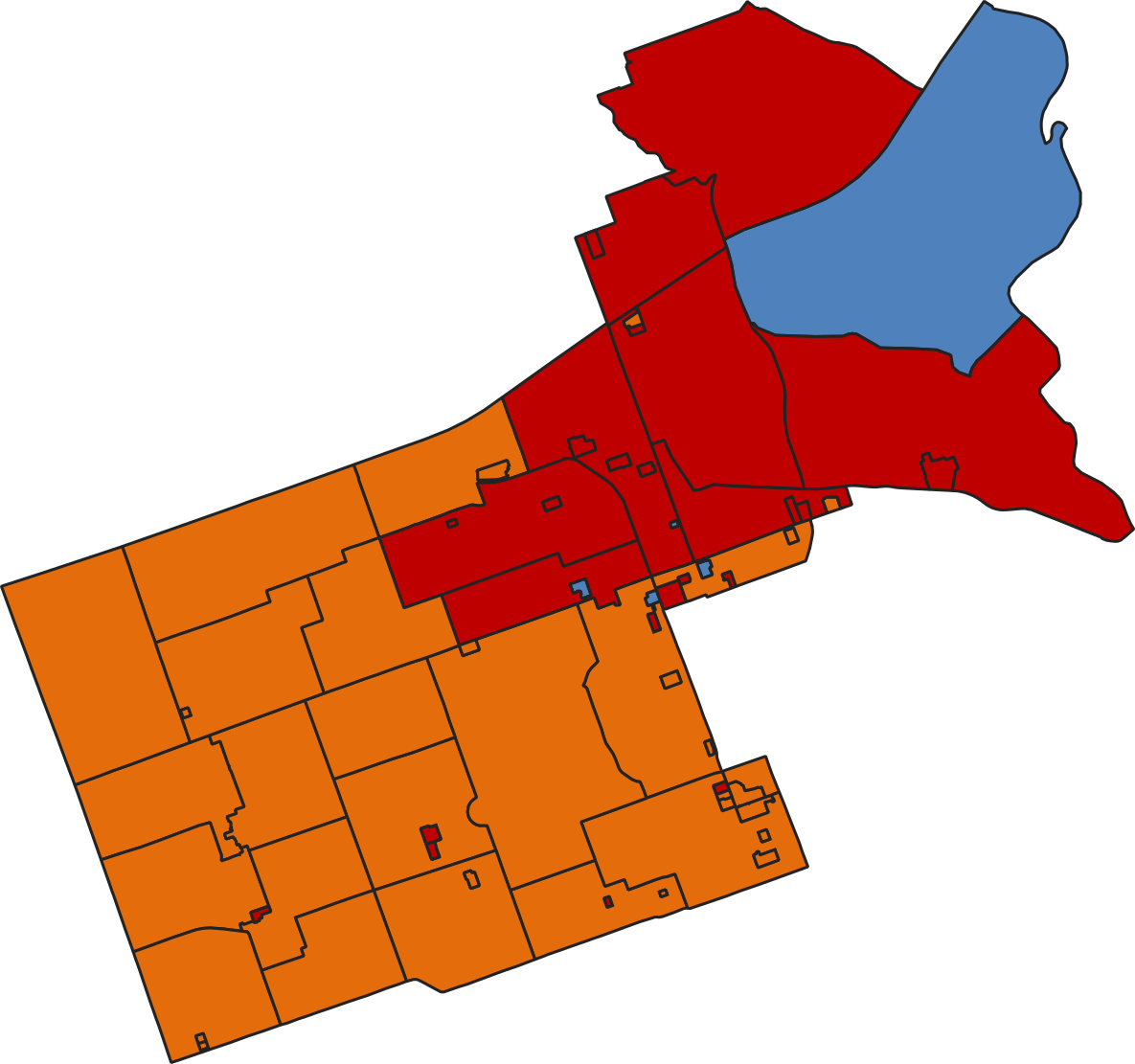
Winner in each polling division in University—Rosedale at the 2022 Ontario General Election

2022 Ontario general election
Party	Candidate	Votes	%	±%	Expenditures
New Democratic	Jessica Bell	13,961	37.55	−12.11	$96,148
Liberal	Andrea Barrack	10,172	27.36	+5.30	$120,103
Progressive Conservative	Carl Qiu	6,535	17.58	−3.53	$43,740
Green	Dianne Saxe	5,904	15.88	+10.51	$118,893
New Blue	James Leventakis	469	1.26		$47
Stop the New Sex-Ed Agenda	John Kanary	140	0.38		$0
Total valid votes/expense limit		37,181	99.49	+0.45	$121,100
Total rejected, unmarked, and declined ballots		189	0.51	−0.45	
Turnout		37,370	43.20	−13.43	
Eligible voters		86,192			
New Democratic hold		Swing		−8.71	
Source(s): "Summary of Valid Votes Cast for Each Candidate" (PDF). Elections Ontario. 2022. Archived from the original on May 18, 2023.; "Statistical Summary by Electoral District" (PDF). Elections Ontario. 2022. Archived from the original on May 21, 2023.

=== 2018 Election ===
2018 Ontario general election
Party	Candidate	Votes	%	±%
New Democratic	Jessica Bell	24,537	49.66	+25.39
Liberal	Jo-Ann Davis	10,898	22.06	-26.04
Progressive Conservative	Gillian Smith	10,431	21.11	+2.98
Green	Tim Grant	2,652	5.37	-1.69
New People's Choice	Daryl Christoff	284	0.57	
Independent	Doug MacLeod	220	0.45	
Libertarian	Ryan Swim	206	0.42	
Go Vegan	Paulo Figueiras	106	0.21	
Special Needs	Hilton Milan	78	0.16	
Total valid votes		49,412	99.04	
Total rejected, unmarked and declined ballots		480	0.96	
Turnout		49,892	56.63	
Eligible voters		88,097		
New Democratic pickup new district.				
Source: Elections Ontario

== See also ==
- List of Ontario provincial electoral districts
- Canadian provincial electoral districts
