= Jessica Bell (politician) =

Canadian politician

Jessica Bell MPP
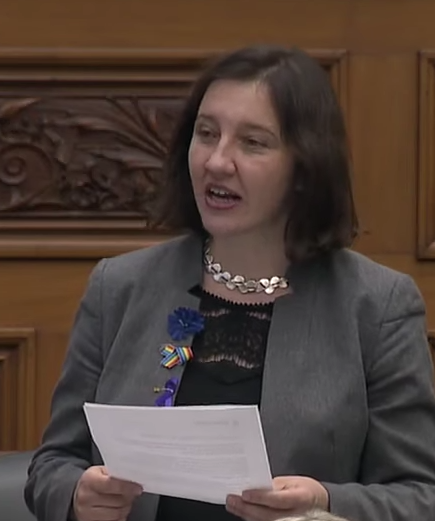

Member of the Ontario Provincial Parliament for University—Rosedale
- Incumbent
- Assumed office June 7, 2018
- Preceded by: Constituency established

Shadow Cabinet Positions
- 2025–Present: Finance and Treasury Board
- 2022–2025: Housing
- 2018–2022: Transit

Personal details
- Citizenship: Canada; United States
- Party: Ontario New Democratic
- Occupation: Politician; community organizer

Jessica Bell is a Canadian politician who is the member of Provincial Parliament (MPP) for University—Rosedale. Bell was elected to the Legislative Assembly of Ontario in 2018 as a member of the Ontario New Democratic Party (NDP). She is currently the Official Opposition critic for finance and Treasury Board.

== Advocacy ==
Bell was a community organizer and was involved with advocacy groups across North America. She was a member of the Rainforest Action Network, where in 2004, she and a group of nine demonstrators were arrested after climbing a crane in Seattle and displaying a banner against old-growth logging. Her trespassing charge was later withdrawn. Bell has also been arrested as part of a protest over mercury contamination in the Grassy Narrows First Nation.

Bell founded TTCriders, an advocacy group campaigning for improving the Toronto Transit Commission (TTC). She was the group's first executive director. Bell has also been the director of the California Food and Justice Coalition, and was a lecturer at Toronto Metropolitan University.

== Political career ==
Bell was elected to the Legislative Assembly of Ontario in the 2018 provincial election. Bell was named the Opposition critic for transit.

Bell introduced a private member's bill, Bill 62, Protecting Vulnerable Road Users Act. The bill proposed increased penalties for vehicle drivers who injure or kill pedestrians, cyclists, or first responders. Bill 62 was not voted on by the Legislative Assembly of Ontario before it was dissolved for the 2022 Ontario general election. Bell proposed two further related bills in 2019 and 2020; one which required the reporting of dooring accidents and another which would have established a Vision Zero strategy in Ontario, respectively. Neither bill was considered by the Legislature.

In 2021, she became the Opposition critic for housing issues. Bell has criticized the Progressive Conservative government for ordering the demolition of bike lanes in Toronto and removing legal protections for injured cyclists.

Bell was re-elected in the 2022 provincial election, remaining as Opposition housing critic.

She was re-elected in the 2025 provincial election, later becoming the Opposition critic for finance and Treasury Board.

Bell endorsed Avi Lewis in the 2026 New Democratic Party leadership election.

== Personal life ==
Bell is a dual citizen of Canada and the United States.

She voted for Kamala Harris in the 2024 United States presidential election.

== Electoral record ==
2025 Ontario general election: University—Rosedale
Party	Candidate	Votes	%	±%	Expenditures
New Democratic	Jessica Bell	17,912	45.50	+7.95	$107,466
Liberal	Pam Jeffery	12,098	30.73	+3.37	$56,489
Progressive Conservative	Sydney Pothakos	7,829	19.89	+2.31	$21,046
Green	Ignacio Mongrell	1,227	3.12	–12.76	$34,382
New Blue	Dylan Harris	299	0.76	–0.50	$60
Total valid votes/expense limit		39,365	99.26	–0.23	$135,985
Total rejected, unmarked, and declined ballots		295	0.74	+0.23	
Turnout		39,660	45.37	+2.17	
Eligible voters		87,418			
New Democratic hold		Swing		+2.29	
Source: Elections Ontario

2022 Ontario general election: University—Rosedale
Party	Candidate	Votes	%	±%	Expenditures
New Democratic	Jessica Bell	13,961	37.55	−12.11	$96,148
Liberal	Andrea Barrack	10,172	27.36	+5.30	$120,103
Progressive Conservative	Carl Qiu	6,535	17.58	−3.53	$43,740
Green	Dianne Saxe	5,904	15.88	+10.51	$118,893
New Blue	James Leventakis	469	1.26		$47
Stop the New Sex-Ed Agenda	John Kanary	140	0.38		$0
Total valid votes/expense limit		37,181	99.49	+0.45	$121,100
Total rejected, unmarked, and declined ballots		189	0.51	−0.45	
Turnout		37,370	43.20	−13.43	
Eligible voters		86,192			
New Democratic hold		Swing		−8.71	
Source(s): "Summary of Valid Votes Cast for Each Candidate" (PDF). Elections Ontario. 2022. Archived from the original on 18 May 2023.; "Statistical Summary by Electoral District" (PDF). Elections Ontario. 2022. Archived from the original on 21 May 2023.

2018 Ontario general election: University—Rosedale
Party	Candidate	Votes	%	±%
New Democratic	Jessica Bell	24,537	49.66	+25.39
Liberal	Jo-Ann Davis	10,898	22.06	-26.04
Progressive Conservative	Gillian Smith	10,431	21.11	+2.98
Green	Tim Grant	2,652	5.37	-1.69
New People's Choice	Daryl Christoff	284	0.57	
Independent	Doug MacLeod	220	0.45	
Libertarian	Ryan Swim	206	0.42	
Go Vegan	Paulo Figueiras	106	0.21	
Special Needs	Hilton Milan	78	0.16	
Total valid votes		49,412	99.04	
Total rejected, unmarked and declined ballots		480	0.96	
Turnout		49,892	56.63	
Eligible voters		88,097		
New Democratic pickup new district.				
Source: Elections Ontario
