= Kevin Clarke (politician) =

Canadian perennial candidate (born 1964)

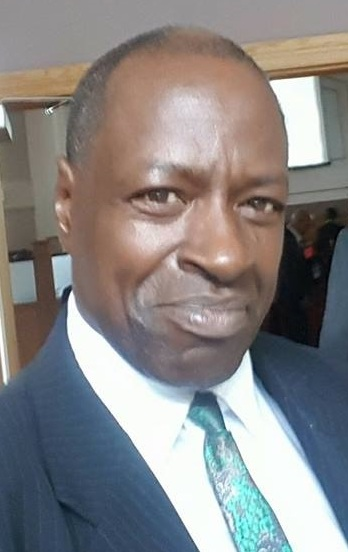

President of The People's Political Party
- In office 2021–2023
- Preceded by: Office established
- Succeeded by: Office distablished

Leader of The People's Political Party
- In office September 3, 2011 – 2021
- Preceded by: Position established
- Succeeded by: Troy Young

Personal details
- Born: Kevin Mark Clarke; March 21, 1964 (age 62) St. Ann's Bay, Jamaica
- Party: The People's Political Party

Kevin Mark Clarke (born March 21, 1964) is a Canadian activist, perennial candidate, and former educator, who is the founder and former leader of The People's Political Party. He is considered one of the most recognizable homeless persons in the city of Toronto, campaigning on "the people's rights."

Clarke advocates for criminal justice reform, and has proposed 'The Inmate Monitored Education System' (TIME), a program to reduce recidivism among first-time offenders. He also campaigns on the issues of poverty and homelessness.

== Biography ==
In the 1980s, Clarke worked as a Grade 5 teacher at Chester Le Junior Public School in Scarborough.

He worked in the automobile business during the early 1990s. He sought election as Mayor of East York in the 1994 municipal election, describing himself as an "advertising consultant, political rebel and welfare recipient". He promised to resign after three months if elected, and to form a provincial party for ordinary people.

Clarke first campaigned for the Legislative Assembly of Ontario in the 1995 general election, challenging New Democratic Party Premier Bob Rae in York South. He received 170 votes, finishing seventh in a field of nine candidates. During this election, Clarke vowed to oppose the "pimps" of government who "live off the avails of the people".

Clarke campaigned for York South again in 1996 after Rae retired from the legislature, and finished last in a field of six candidates with 70 votes. The winner was Gerard Kennedy of the Ontario Liberal Party.

He sought election to the House of Commons of Canada in the 1997 federal election, and finished sixth out of eight candidates in Broadview—Greenwood with 211 votes. The winner was Dennis Mills of the Liberal Party of Canada. During this election, Clarke described himself as a salesman and a businessman.

He became homeless in 1998 after his auto business failed. For the next seven years, he frequently sang and preached on the streets of Toronto. He was also actively involved in public affairs and was a member of the Toronto Disaster Relief Committee.

Clarke ran for the Ontario legislature a third time in a by-election for Beaches—East York on September 20, 2001. He finished sixth out of eight candidates with 94 votes. The winner was Michael Prue of the New Democratic Party.

Clarke campaigned for Mayor of Toronto in the 2000, 2003 and 2006 municipal elections, and ran for Toronto City Council in by-elections held in 1998 and 2001. His primary issues were street and water safety, though he also emphasized anti-drug policies. He ran his 2001 campaign out of a homeless shelter which he used every night. In the 1998 campaign, his age was listed as thirty-four.

He took part in an unusual protest during the 2003 campaign, by tearing up pieces of a telephone book and scattering them to the wind during lunch hour at a busy Toronto intersection. "You care if there's paper on the street," he said to passers-by, "but you don't care if there's people on the street". He also described himself as an "ex-con, ex-drug dealer and ex-teacher".

Clarke found housing again in 2005, and worked as an actor during this period.

He was a candidate running for the 2010 Toronto mayoral election. Clarke has been known to employ eccentric tactics to reach the public during his campaign, including speeches while aboard the TTC and rollerblading whilst shouting campaign slogans on the road in Kingston Road and Lawrence Avenue East area.

In the 2011 Ontario election he ran as leader of the People's Political Party.

Clarke ran for mayor in the 2018 election, where he finished with 3,853 votes.

Clarke is known for attending debates and causing a commotion. He was not invited to a debate Toronto Centre By-election in 2013; however, he showed up and began yelling at the Liberal Party candidate Chrystia Freeland and New Democratic Candidate Linda McQuaig. He was subsequently arrested, and the debate was cancelled. Additionally in 2019, he attended a debate on the environment and climate change ahead of the 2019 federal election in Scarborough-Guildwood, where only members of the major political parties were invited. He entered holding a large hand-painted "Vote Kevin Clarke" sign and immediately began yelling and criticizing the debate organizers as well as Liberal Party incumbent candidate John McKay. Upon discussion between the organizers and invited candidates, he was eventually allowed to participate in the debate on the condition he remained orderly.

Clarke ran in the 2020 Toronto Centre federal by-election.

Clarke unsuccessfully ran for Toronto mayor in the 2022 mayoral election and the 2023 mayoral by-election.

He was a candidate in the 2023 Scarborough—Guildwood provincial by-election.

Clarke found himself homeless again on March 30, 2025, due to a fire in his apartment. Clarke was charged with arson, which he disputed, and instead blamed faulty electrical work by Toronto Community Housing, and the homeless roommate he was temporarily housing, of whom left the room minutes before the fire was discovered by Clarke. His charges were withdrawn on November 28th 2025. On December 5th 2025, Clarke returned to his apartment after its repairs were completed.

Clarke does not identify as black, and instead identifies himself as a person to be judged by the content of his character.

== Electoral record ==
Toronto mayoral elections
Year	Votes	Vote %	Place
2000	4,147	0.68	7th
2003	804	0.12	12th
2006	2,081	0.36	12th
2010	1,411	0.173	14th
2014	547	0.06	18th
2018	3,853	0.51	7th
2022	4,333	0.79	9th
2023	265	0.04	34th

Ontario provincial by-election, July 27, 2023: Scarborough—Guildwood Resignation of Mitzie Hunter
Party	Candidate	Votes	%	±%	Expenditures
Liberal	Andrea Hazell	5,640	36.55	–9.75	$85,245
Progressive Conservative	Gary Crawford	4,562	29.57	–1.95	$57,878
New Democratic	Thadsha Navaneethan	4,041	26.19	+9.53	$80,598
Stop the New Sex-Ed Agenda	Tony Walton	508	3.29	–	$26,608
New Blue	Danielle Height	151	0.98	–0.29	$10,691
Green	Tara McMahon	146	0.95	–1.88	$0
No Affiliation	Reginald Tull	139	0.90	–	$8,266
Canadians' Choice	Paul Fromm	66	0.43	–	$0
Independent	Kevin Clarke	57	0.37	–0.14	$7,002
Independent	Habiba Desai	52	0.34	–	$0
Independent	Abu Alam	48	0.31	–	$395
Independent	John Turmel	20	0.13	–	$0
Total valid votes		15,430	99.49		
Total rejected, unmarked and declined ballots		79	0.51	–0.37	
Turnout		15,509	21.88	–19.75	
Eligible voters		70,893			
Liberal hold		Swing		–3.90	
Source: Elections Ontario

2022 Ontario general election: Scarborough—Guildwood
Party	Candidate	Votes	%	±%	Expenditures
Liberal	Mitzie Hunter	13,405	46.31	+12.96	$87,259
Progressive Conservative	Alicia Vianga	9,123	31.51	−1.62	$78,144
New Democratic	Veronica Javier	4,824	16.66	−10.96	$42,008
Green	Dean Boulding	818	2.83	+0.38	$381
New Blue	Opa Hope Day	366	1.26		$1,980
Ontario Party	William Moore	265	0.92		$0
People's Political Party	Kevin Clarke	148	0.51	+0.09	$0
Total valid votes/expense limit		28,949	99.12	+0.32	$98,214
Total rejected, unmarked, and declined ballots		256	0.88	-0.32	
Turnout		29,205	41.63	-11.55	
Eligible voters		69,754			
Liberal hold		Swing		+7.29	
Source(s): "Summary of Valid Votes Cast for Each Candidate" (PDF). Elections Ontario. 2022. Archived from the original on 2023-05-18.; "Statistical Summary by Electoral District" (PDF). Elections Ontario. 2022. Archived from the original on 2023-05-21.

2021 Canadian federal election: Scarborough—Guildwood
Party	Candidate	Votes	%	±%
Liberal	John McKay	22,944	61.1	±0.0
Conservative	Carmen Wilson	7,998	21.3	-1.1
New Democratic	Michelle Spencer	5,091	13.6	+2.4
People's	James Bountrogiannis	1,096	2.9	+1.4
Independent	Kevin Clarke	155	0.4	+0.1
Centrist	Aslam Khan	129	0.3	N/A
Independent	Opa Day	85	0.2	N/A
Canadian Nationalist	Gus Stefanis	52	0.1	-0.1
Total valid votes		37,550	98.6	
Total rejected ballots		548	1.4	
Turnout		38,098	58.0	
Eligible voters		65,711		
Liberal hold		Swing		+0.6
Source: Elections Canada

Canadian federal by-election, October 26, 2020: Toronto Centre Resignation of Bill Morneau
Party	Candidate	Votes	%	±%	Expenditures
Liberal	Marci Ien	10,581	42.0	-15.4	$116,839
Green	Annamie Paul	8,250	32.7	+25.6	$100,008
New Democratic	Brian Chang	4,280	17.0	-5.3	$71,222
Conservative	Benjamin Gauri Sharma	1,435	5.7	-6.4	$0
People's	Baljit Bawa	269	1.1	–	$22,752
Libertarian	Keith Komar	135	0.5	–	
Independent	Kevin Clarke	123	0.5	–	
Free	Dwayne Cappelletti	76	0.3	–	$1,570
No affiliation	Above Znoneofthe	56	0.2	–	$0
Total valid votes		25,205	100.0	–	
Total rejected ballots		118	0.5	-0.2	
Turnout		25,323	30.9	-35.2	
Electors on lists		81,861			
Liberal hold		Swing		-20.5	
Elections Canada

2019 Canadian federal election: Scarborough—Guildwood
Party	Candidate	Votes	%	±%	Expenditures
Liberal	John McKay	26,123	61.12	+1.08	$79,793.87
Conservative	Quintus Thuraisingham	9,553	22.35	-4.15	$57,402.46
New Democratic	Michelle Spencer	4,806	11.24	-0.02	none listed
Green	Tara McMahon	1,220	2.85	+1.41	none listed
People's	Jigna Jani	648	1.52	-	none listed
Independent	Kevin Clarke	112	0.26	-0.16	none listed
Canadian Nationalist	Gus Stefanis	85	0.20	–	none listed
Independent	Stephen Abara	70	0.16	-	none listed
Independent	Kathleen Marie Holding	70	0.16	-	none listed
Canada's Fourth Front	Farhan Alvi	55	0.13	-	$791.00
Total valid votes/expense limit		42,742	98.66		
Total rejected ballots		580	1.34	+0.87	
Turnout		43,322	62.89	-1.69	
Eligible voters		68,886			
Liberal hold		Swing		+2.61	
Source: Elections Canada

2018 Ontario general election: Toronto Centre
Party	Candidate	Votes	%	±%
New Democratic	Suze Morrison	23,688	53.66	+37.87
Liberal	David Morris	11,986	27.15	-31.07
Progressive Conservative	Meredith Cartwright	6,234	14.12	-4.43
Green	Adam Sommerfeld	1,377	3.12	-1.30
Libertarian	Judi Falardeau	371	0.84	-0.23
Special Needs	Dan King	117	0.27	-0.12
New People's Choice	Cameron James	110	0.25	
Stop the New Sex-Ed Agenda	Theresa Snell	102	0.23	
The People	Kevin Clarke	98	0.22	+0.06
Canadian Economic	Wanda Marie Fountain	65	0.15	
Total valid votes		44,148	100.0	
Total rejected, unmarked and declined ballots		404	0.92	
Turnout		44,552	54.30	
Eligible voters		82,044		
New Democratic gain from Liberal		Swing		+34.47
Source: Elections Ontario

2015 Canadian federal election: Scarborough—Guildwood
Party	Candidate	Votes	%	±%	Expenditures
Liberal	John McKay	25,167	60.04	+24.25	$77,572.69
Conservative	Chuck Konkel	11,108	26.50	-8.19	$80,342.41
New Democratic	Laura Casselman	4,720	11.26	-15.44	$14,956.71
Green	Kathleen Holding	606	1.45	-0.78	–
Independent	Kevin Clarke	175	0.42	–	–
Marijuana	Paul Coulbeck	141	0.34	-0.26	–
Total valid votes/Expense limit		41,917	99.53		$198,726.79
Total rejected ballots		198	0.47		
Turnout		42,115	64.58		
Eligible voters		65,217			
Liberal hold		Swing		+16.22	
Source: Elections Canada

2014 Ontario general election: Scarborough—Agincourt
Party	Candidate	Votes	%	±%
Liberal	Soo Wong	17,332	49.84	+2.82
Progressive Conservative	Liang Chen	12,041	34.63	+2.64
New Democratic	Alex Wilson	4,105	11.81	-3.94
Green	Pauline Thompson	907	2.61	+0.34
The People	Kevin Clarke	387	1.11	
Total valid votes		34,772	100.0	
Liberal hold		Swing		+0.09
Source: Elections Ontario

Ontario provincial by-election, February 13, 2014: Thornhill Resignation of Peter Shurman
Party	Candidate	Votes	%	±%
Progressive Conservative	Gila Martow	13,438	47.89	+1.18
Liberal	Sandra Yeung Racco	11,671	41.60	+0.68
New Democratic	Cindy Hackelberg	1,905	6.79	-2.17
Green	Teresa Pun	404	1.44	-0.24
Libertarian	Gene Balfour	296	1.05	-0.34
Freedom	Erin Goodwin	153	0.55	+0.22
People's Political Party	Kevin Clarke	144	0.51	
Pauper	John Turmel	47	0.17	
Total valid votes		28,058	100.00	
Total rejected, unmarked and declined ballots		126	0.45	
Turnout		28,184	27.36	
Eligible voters		103,021		
Progressive Conservative hold		Swing		+0.25
Source: Elections Ontario

Canadian federal by-election, November 25, 2013: Toronto Centre (federal electoral district) Resignation of Bob Rae (July 31, 2013)
Party	Candidate	Votes	%	±%	Expenditures
Liberal	Chrystia Freeland	17,194	49.38	+8.37	$ 97,609.64
New Democratic	Linda McQuaig	12,640	36.30	+6.09	99,230.30
Conservative	Geoff Pollock	3,004	8.63	−14.01	75,557.39
Green	John Deverell	1,034	2.97	−2.05	21,521.10
Progressive Canadian	Dorian Baxter	453	1.30		–
Libertarian	Judi Falardeau	236	0.68	+0.18	–
Independent	Kevin Clarke	84	0.24		560.00
Independent	John "The Engineer" Turmel	56	0.16		–
Independent	Leslie Bory	51	0.15		633.30
Online	Michael Nicula	43	0.12		200.00
Independent	Bahman Yazdanfar	26	0.07	−0.12	1,134.60
Total valid votes/expense limit		34,821	99.49	–	$ 101,793.06
Total rejected ballots		177	0.51	+0.12	
Turnout		34,998	37.72	−25.21	
Eligible voters		92,780			
Liberal hold		Swing		+1.14	
Source(s) "November 25, 2013 By-elections Poll-by-poll results". Elections Canada. "November 25, 2013 By-election – Financial Reports".

Ontario provincial by-election, September 6, 2012: Kitchener—Waterloo Resignation of Elizabeth Witmer
Party	Candidate	Votes	%	±%
New Democratic	Catherine Fife	18,599	39.87	+23.20
Progressive Conservative	Tracey Weiler	14,851	31.83	–11.94
Liberal	Eric Davis	11,194	23.99	–12.04
Green	Stacey Danckert	1,525	3.27	+0.63
Libertarian	Allan Dettweiler	156	0.33	–
Freedom	David Driver	95	0.20	–0.04
Communist	Elizabeth Rowley	85	0.18	–
Independent	Garnet Bruce	77	0.17	–
People's Political Party	Kevin Clarke	48	0.10	–
Pauper	John Turmel	23	0.05	–
Total valid votes		46,653	99.73	
Total rejected, unmarked and declined ballots		128	0.27	–0.06
Turnout		46,781	47.00	–3.55
Eligible voters		99,544		
New Democratic gain from Progressive Conservative		Swing		+17.62
Source: Elections Ontario

2011 Ontario general election: Toronto—Danforth
Party	Candidate	Votes	%	±%
New Democratic	Peter Tabuns	20,062	54.01	+8.16
Liberal	Marisa Sterling	11,369	30.60	+1.40
Progressive Conservative	Rita Jethi	3,488	9.39	-1.89
Green	Tim Whalley	1,354	3.64	-7.51
Libertarian	John Recker	440	1.18	+0.01
People's Political Party	Kevin Clarke	143	0.38	
Independent	Neil Mercer	110	0.30	
Freedom	Stéphane Vera	107	0.29	
Independent	John Richardson	75	0.20	
Total valid votes		37,148	100.00	
Rejected		157	0.42	
Unmarked		45	0.12	
Declined		24	0.06	
Turnout		37,374	49.30	
Eligible voters		75,815		
New Democratic hold		Swing		+3.38
Source: Elections Ontario

Ontario provincial by-election, September 20, 2001: Beaches—East York
Party	Candidate	Votes	%	±%
New Democratic	Michael Prue	14,024	49.83	+4.26
Liberal	Robert Hunter	10,289	36.56	+14.98
Progressive Conservative	Mac Penney	2,821	10.02	-19.53
Green	Peter Elgie	694	2.47	+1.47
Family Coalition	Ray Scott	206	0.73	+0.12
Independent	Kevin Clarke	94	0.35	–
Independent	Vince Corriere	59	0.21	–
Independent	Don King	51	0.18	–
Total valid votes		28,144	100.0	–
Elections Ontario:

1997 Canadian federal election: Broadview—Greenwood
Party	Candidate	Votes	%	±%
Liberal	Dennis Mills	21,108	49.76	-11.31
New Democratic	Jack Layton	13,903	32.77	+18.82
Reform	Brian Higgins	3,247	7.65	-3.64
Progressive Conservative	Dianne Garrels	3,238	7.63	-1.71
Green	Karen McCarthy	426	1.00	–
Independent	Kevin Clarke	211	0.50	–
Natural Law	Bob Hyman	205	0.48	-0.53
Marxist–Leninist	Gurdev Singh	85	0.20	-0.04
Total valid votes		42,423	100.00	–

Ontario provincial by-election, May 23, 1996: York South
Party	Candidate	Votes	%
Liberal	Gerard Kennedy	7,774	39.22
New Democratic	David Miller	6,656	33.58
Progressive Conservative	Rob Davis	5,093	25.69
Independent	David Milne	151	0.76
Libertarian	George Dance	77	0.39
Independent	Kevin Clarke	70	0.35
Total valid votes		19,821	100.00
Rejected, unmarked and declined ballots		264	
Turnout		20,085	51.38
Electors on the lists		39,092	
Source: Elections Ontario

1995 Ontario general election: York South
Party	Candidate	Votes	%	Expenditures
New Democratic	Bob Rae	10,442	41.24	$39,100.07
Progressive Conservative	Larry Edwards	7,726	30.51	$28,482.21
Liberal	Hagood Hardy	6,025	23.79	$42,578.22
Family Coalition	Don Pennell	305	1.20	$4,210.68
Green	David James Cooper	219	0.86	$1,046.57
Natural Law	Bob Hyman	176	0.70	$0.00
Independent	Kevin Clarke	170	0.67	$1,164.66
Libertarian	Roma Kelembet	153	0.60	$819.58
Communist	Darrell Rankin	105	0.41	$59.00
Total valid votes		25,321	100.00	
Rejected, unmarked and declined ballots		388		
Turnout		25,709	69.13	
Electors on the lists		37,192		

1994 East York municipal election — Mayor
Candidate	Votes	%
Michael Prue	15,620	63.10
Bob Willis	6,295	25.43
Anne Sinclair	1,403	5.67
Kevin Clarke	788	3.18
June French	648	2.62
Total valid votes	24,754	100%
