= Kelly Hayes =

Kelly Hayes may refer to:

- Kelly Hayes, Canadian politician (see New Democratic Party candidates, 2003 Ontario provincial election)
- Kelly Hayes, the former lead guitarist in the hard rock band Cold
