= Go Vegan (political party) =

Provincial political party in Ontario, Canada

- Former provincial party
- Leader: Paulo Figueiras
- Founded: 2011
- Headquarters: P.O. Box 67679, Toronto, ON M5T 3M1
- Ideology: Animal rights Environmentalism; Secularism
- Political position: Left-wing
- Seats in Legislature: 0 / 107

Go Vegan (formerly the Vegan Environmental Party) is a former minor animal rights and environmentalist provincial political party in Ontario, Canada.

== History ==
Go Vegan was founded as the Vegan Environmental Party in preparation for the 2011 Ontario general election.

The party de-registered before the 2022 election.

== Ideology ==
The party stands for the protection of both animals and people, calling for:

1. An end to animal agriculture in Ontario
2. No new nuclear power plants in Ontario, and a decommissioning of those still in operation
3. Focusing more on renewable energy sources
4. Overhauling the Ministry of Natural Resources so that it represents the needs of all Ontarians (humans and nonhuman animals alike) rather than the needs of hunters.

Policy positions unrelated to the environment taken by the party would arguably place it on the left wing in Ontario politics. The party calls for increased welfare and disability funding to reflect the actual cost of living in Ontario, eliminating tuition fees at Ontario universities, raising the minimum wage in Ontario to reflect cost of living in Ontario, subsidizing affordable housing, increasing funding for public transportation, and eliminating public funding for religious schools. Like many minor political parties, Go Vegan calls for a change in the electoral system from a first-past-the-post to a system involving Proportional representation.

== Electoral results ==
In the 2011 Ontario general election, the Vegan Environmental Party nominated three candidates for the Legislative Assembly of Ontario:

2011 Ontario general election results
Riding	Candidate's Name	Notes	Votes	%	Rank
Don Valley West	Rosemary Waigh		108	0.26%	6/7
Toronto Centre	Harvey Rotenberg		62	0.14%	7/10
Mississauga South	Paulo Figueiras	Party Leader	165	0.41%	6/6

In the 2014 election:

2014 Ontario general election results
Riding	Candidate's name	Notes	Votes	%	Rank
Don Valley West	Rosemary Waigh		116	0.25%	8/9
Toronto Centre	Harvey Rotenberg		187	0.37%	8/11
Trinity—Spadina	Paulo Figueiras	Party Leader	308	0.53%	6/7
Toronto—Danforth	Simon Luisi		149	0.35%	8/10
Etobicoke Centre	Felicia Trigiani		142	0.30%	8/8

In the 2018 election, the party ran two candidates:

2018 Ontario general election results
Riding	Candidate's name	Notes	Votes	%	Rank
Mississauga—Lakeshore	Felicia Trigiani		150	0.28%	7/7
University—Rosedale	Paulo Figueiras	Party Leader	106	0.21%	8/9

== See also ==
- Animal Protection Party of Canada, a similar but unaffiliated party at the federal level
