= Scarborough—Guildwood (provincial electoral district) =

Provincial electoral district in Ontario, Canada

Ontario electoral district
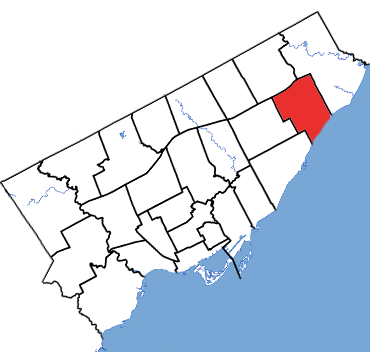
- Scarborough—Guildwood in relation to the other Toronto ridings
- Coordinates: 43.763°N 79.207°W

Provincial electoral district
- Legislature: Legislative Assembly of Ontario
MPP
Andrea Hazell
Liberal
- District created: 2006
- First contested: 2007
- Last contested: 2025

Demographics
- Population (2016): 102,390
- Electors (2018): 68,662
- Area (km²): 27
- Pop. density (per km²): 3,792.2
- Census division: Toronto
- Census subdivision: Toronto

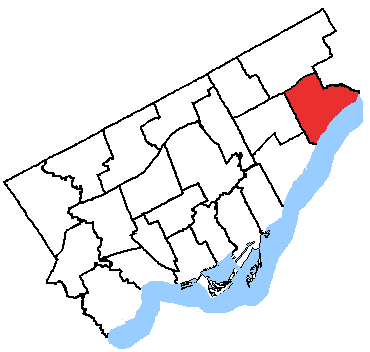
Scarborough—Guildwood from 2003 to 2018

Scarborough—Guildwood is a provincial electoral district in the Scarborough section of Toronto, Ontario, Canada, that has been represented in Legislative Assembly of Ontario since the 2007 provincial election.

It was created in 2003 from parts of Scarborough East, Scarborough Southwest and Scarborough Centre.

== Boundaries ==
On August 14, 2018, the province redrew municipal boundaries via the Better Local Government Act, 2018, S.O. 2018, c. 11 - Bill 5. This means that the 25 Provincial districts and the 25 municipal wards in Toronto currently share the same geographic borders.

Defined in legislation as: "Consisting of that part of the City of Toronto described as follows: commencing at the intersection of Highway No. 401 with Morningside Avenue; thence southerly along said avenue and its production to the southerly limit of said city; thence southwesterly along said limit to the southerly production of Markham Road; thence northerly along said production and Markham Road to Eglinton Avenue East; thence westerly along said avenue to the southerly production of Bellamy Road North; thence generally northerly along said production and Bellamy Road North to Lawrence Avenue East; thence westerly along said avenue to McCowan Road; thence northerly along said road to Highway No. 401; thence easterly along said highway to the point of commencement."

== Geography ==
The riding consists of the part of the City of Toronto bounded by a line drawn from Lake Ontario north along Markham Road, west along Eglinton Avenue, north along Bellamy Road South, west along Lawrence Avenue, north along McCowan Road, east along Highway 401, south along Morningside Avenue back to Lake Ontario.

The riding contains most of its namesake neighbourhood of Guildwood (west of Morningside), as well as the neighbourhoods of Bendale (east of McCowan), Curran Hall, Golfdale Gardens, Morningside (Seven Oaks), Scarborough City Centre (east of McCowan), Scarborough Village (east of Markham Rd and north of Eglinton), South Cedarbrae (east of Bellamy), West Hill (west of Morningside as well) and Woburn, plus Centennial College.

== Members of Provincial Parliament ==
Assembly	Years	Member	Party
Scarborough—Guildwood; Riding created from Scarborough East, Scarborough Southwest and Scarborough Centre
39th	2007–2011	Margarett Best	Liberal
40th	2011–2013	Margarett Best	Liberal
40th	2013–2014	Mitzie Hunter	Liberal
41st	2014–2018	Mitzie Hunter	Liberal
42nd	2018–2022	Mitzie Hunter	Liberal
43rd	2022–2023	Mitzie Hunter	Liberal
43rd	2023–2025	Andrea Hazell	Liberal
44th	2025–present	Andrea Hazell	Liberal
Sourced from the Ontario Legislative Assembly

== Election results ==
Winning party in each polling division of Scarborough—Guildwood at the 2025 Ontario general election

2025 Ontario general election
Party	Candidate	Votes	%	±%
Liberal	Andrea Hazell	13,813	51.02	+14.47
Progressive Conservative	Jude Aloysius	10,224	37.76	+8.20
New Democratic	Christian Keay	1,811	6.69	–19.50
Green	Tara McMahon	661	2.44	+1.50
New Blue	Anthony Internicola	298	1.10	+0.12
Independent	Kevin Clarke	169	0.62	+0.25
Independent	Kingsley Cato	98	0.36	–
Total valid votes		27,074	99.13	
Total rejected, unmarked and declined ballots		237	0.87	+0.36
Turnout		27,311	38.63	+16.75
Eligible voters		70,700		
Liberal hold		Swing		+3.13
Source: Elections Ontario

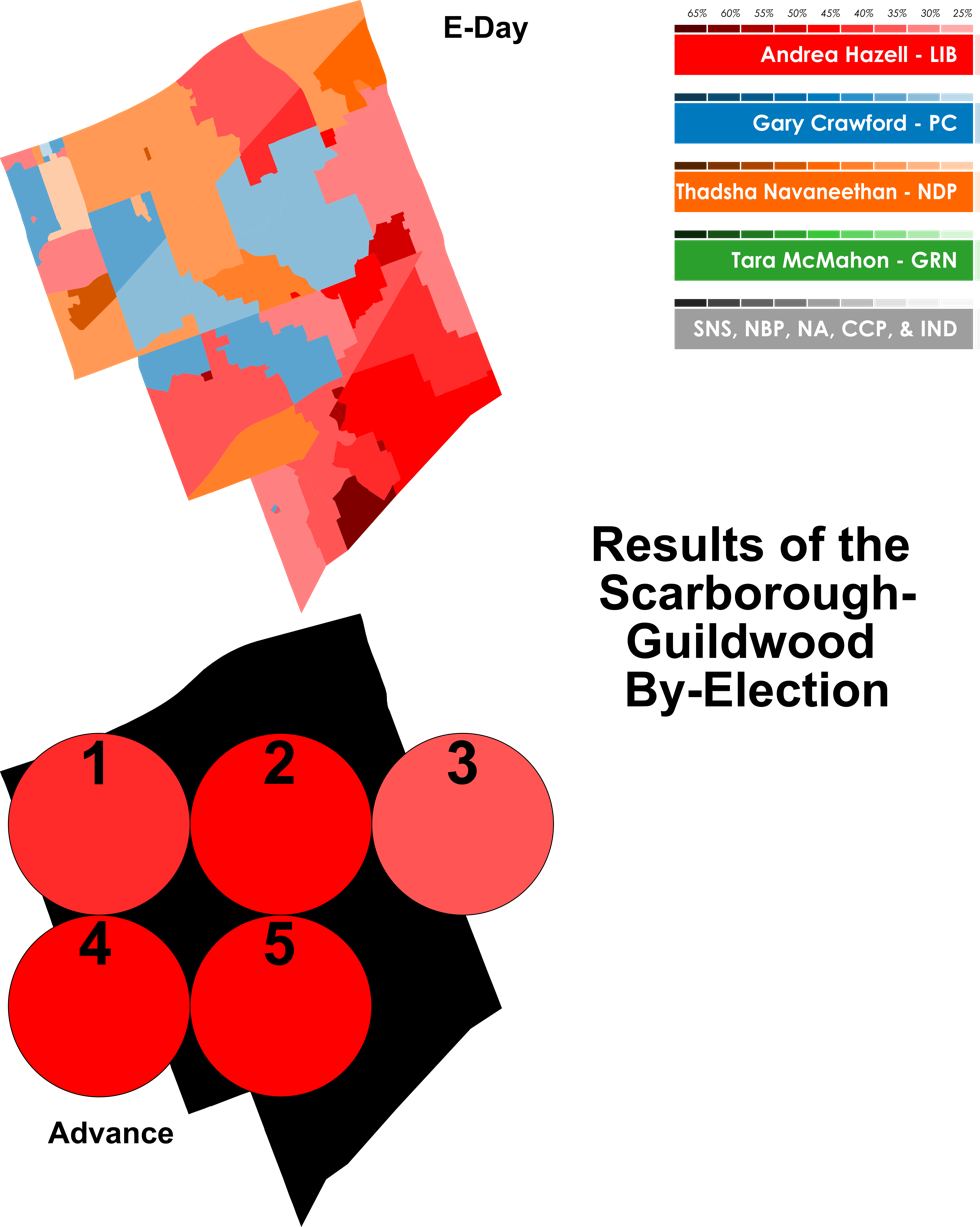

Ontario provincial by-election, July 27, 2023 Resignation of Mitzie Hunter
Party	Candidate	Votes	%	±%	Expenditures
Liberal	Andrea Hazell	5,640	36.55	–9.75	$85,245
Progressive Conservative	Gary Crawford	4,562	29.57	–1.95	$57,878
New Democratic	Thadsha Navaneethan	4,041	26.19	+9.53	$80,598
Stop the New Sex-Ed Agenda	Tony Walton	508	3.29	–	$26,608
New Blue	Danielle Height	151	0.98	–0.29	$10,691
Green	Tara McMahon	146	0.95	–1.88	$0
No Affiliation	Reginald Tull	139	0.90	–	$8,266
Canadians' Choice	Paul Fromm	66	0.43	–	$0
Independent	Kevin Clarke	57	0.37	–0.14	$7,002
Independent	Habiba Desai	52	0.34	–	$0
Independent	Abu Alam	48	0.31	–	$395
Independent	John Turmel	20	0.13	–	$0
Total valid votes		15,430	99.49		
Total rejected, unmarked and declined ballots		79	0.51	–0.37	
Turnout		15,509	21.88	–19.75	
Eligible voters		70,893			
Liberal hold		Swing		–3.90	
Source: Elections Ontario

Winning party in each polling division of Scarborough—Guildwood at the 2022 Ontario general election

2022 Ontario general election
Party	Candidate	Votes	%	±%	Expenditures
Liberal	Mitzie Hunter	13,405	46.31	+12.96	$87,259
Progressive Conservative	Alicia Vianga	9,123	31.51	–1.62	$78,144
New Democratic	Veronica Javier	4,824	16.66	–10.96	$42,008
Green	Dean Boulding	818	2.83	+0.38	$381
New Blue	Opa Hope Day	366	1.26	–	$1,980
Ontario Party	William Moore	265	0.92	–	$0
People's Political Party	Kevin Clarke	148	0.51	+0.09	$0
Total valid votes/expense limit		28,949	99.12	–	$98,214
Total rejected, unmarked and declined ballots		256	0.88	–0.33	
Turnout		29,205	41.63	–11.30	
Eligible voters		70,153			
Liberal hold		Swing		+7.29	
Source: Elections Ontario

2018 Ontario general election
Party	Candidate	Votes	%	±%
Liberal	Mitzie Hunter	11,972	33.34	–17.01
Progressive Conservative	Roshan Nallaratnam	11,898	33.14	+5.20
New Democratic	Tom Packwood	9,917	27.62	+10.64
Green	Linda Rice	878	2.45	–0.37
Libertarian	Hamid-Reza Dehnad-Tabatabaei	445	1.24	–
Trillium	George Marcos Garvida	419	1.17	–
Special Needs	Wanda Ryan	159	0.44	–
People's Political Party	Heather Dunbar	151	0.42	–
No Affiliation	Benjamin Mbaegbu	66	0.18	–
Total valid votes		35,905	98.80	
Total rejected, unmarked and declined ballots		437	1.20	
Turnout		36,342	52.93	
Eligible voters		68,662		
Liberal notional hold		Swing		–11.10
Source: Elections Ontario

^ Results are compared to redistributed results

2014 general election redistributed results
Party	Vote	%
Liberal	16,154	50.35
Progressive Conservative	8,964	27.94
New Democratic	5,448	16.98
Green	902	2.81
Others	614	1.91

2014 Ontario general election
Party	Candidate	Votes	%	±%
Liberal	Mitzie Hunter	17,318	49.89	+14.04
Progressive Conservative	Ken Kirupa	9,721	28.01	–2.79
New Democratic	Shuja Syed	5,894	16.98	–11.37
Green	Jeffrey W. R. Bustard	1,034	2.98	+0.82
Libertarian	Richard Kerr	476	1.37	+0.89
Freedom	Khalid Mokhtarzada	148	0.43	+0.10
Canadians' Choice	John Sawdon	120	0.35	–
Total valid votes		34,711	98.86	
Total rejected, unmarked and declined ballots		399	1.14	+0.41
Turnout		35,110	49.24	+13.41
Eligible voters		71,311		
Liberal hold		Swing		+8.42
Source: Elections Ontario

Ontario provincial by-election, August 1, 2013 Resignation of Margarett Best
Party	Candidate	Votes	%	±%
Liberal	Mitzie Hunter	8,852	35.85	–13.09
Progressive Conservative	Ken Kirupa	7,605	30.80	+2.15
New Democratic	Adam Giambrone	7,000	28.35	+8.93
Green	Nick Leeson	532	2.15	+0.86
Independent	Jim Hamilton	195	0.79	–
Special Needs	Danish Ahmed	183	0.74	–
Libertarian	Heath Thomas	120	0.49	–0.79
Family Coalition	Raphael Rosch	104	0.42	–
Freedom	Matthew Oliver	80	0.32	–0.10
People's Political Party	Bill Rawdah	22	0.09	–
Total valid votes		24,693	99.28	
Total rejected, unmarked and declined ballots		180	0.72	+0.03
Turnout		24,873	35.83	–11.82
Eligible voters		69,425		
Liberal hold		Swing		–7.62
Source: Elections Ontario

2011 Ontario general election
Party	Candidate	Votes	%	±%
Liberal	Margarett Best	15,607	48.93	+6.41
Progressive Conservative	Gary Ellis	9,137	28.65	+0.65
New Democratic	Lorri Urban	6,194	19.42	–2.51
Green	Naoshad Pochkhanawala	413	1.29	–4.04
Libertarian	Sam Apelbaum	407	1.28	–0.15
Freedom	Matthew Oliver	136	0.43	–
Total valid votes		31,894	99.31	
Total rejected, unmarked and declined ballots		223	0.69	–0.40
Turnout		32,117	47.65	–3.64
Eligible voters		67,408		
Liberal hold		Swing		+2.88
Source: Elections Ontario

2007 Ontario general election
Party	Candidate	Votes	%	±%
Liberal	Margarett Best	14,430	42.52	–10.04
Progressive Conservative	Gary Grant	9,503	28.00	–2.00
New Democratic	Neethan Shan	7,441	21.93	+9.22
Green	Glenn Kitchen	1,811	5.34	–
Libertarian	Sam Apelbaum	484	1.43	–
Family Coalition	Daniel Carvalho	267	0.79	–
Total valid votes		33,936	98.90	
Total rejected, unmarked and declined ballots		376	1.10	
Turnout		34,312	51.28	
Eligible voters		66,909		
Liberal notional hold		Swing		–4.02
Source: Elections Ontario

2003 general election redistributed results
Party	Vote	%
Liberal	16,991	52.56
Progressive Conservative	9,698	30.00
New Democratic	4,109	12.71
Others	1,531	4.74

== 2007 electoral reform referendum ==
2007 Ontario electoral reform referendum
Side	Votes	%
First Past the Post	19,514	59.98
Mixed member proportional	13,020	40.02
Total valid votes	32,534	100.00
Sourced from Elections Ontario.

== See also ==
- List of Ontario provincial electoral districts
- Canadian provincial electoral districts
