= David Noonan =

David Noonan may refer to:

- David Noonan (artist) (born 1969), London artist
- David Noonan (cricketer) (1876–1929), Australian cricketer
- David Noonan (game designer), designer for the Dungeons & Dragons game
- David Noonan (environmentalist), Australian anti-nuclear activist and climate campaigner
- David Noonan, New Democratic Party candidate at the 2003 Ontario provincial election
