= 2023 Scarborough—Guildwood provincial by-election =

Provincial by-election in Ontario, Canada

- July 27, 2023

Riding of Scarborough—Guildwood
- Turnout: 21.84%
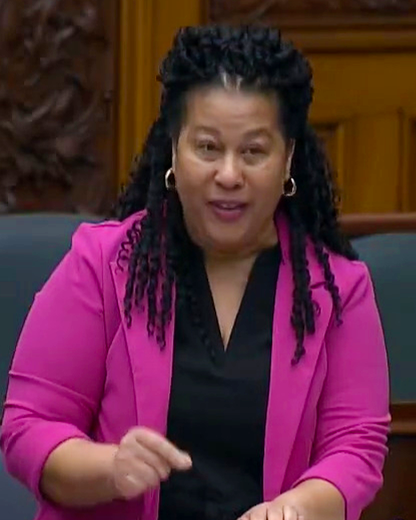

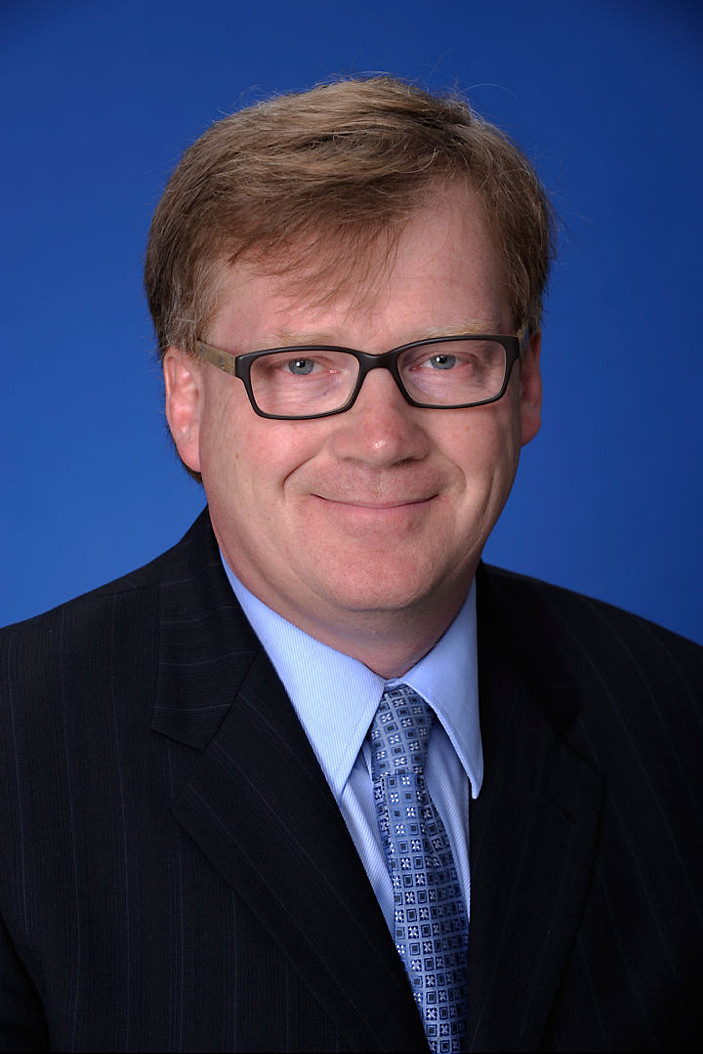
	First party	Second party	Third party
			NDP
Candidate	Andrea Hazell	Gary Crawford	Thadsha Navaneethan
Party	Liberal	Progressive Conservative	New Democratic
Last election	46.31%	31.51%	16.66%
Popular vote	5,640	4,562	4,041
Percentage	36.55%	29.57%	26.19%
Swing	▼9.75%	▼1.95%	▲9.53%
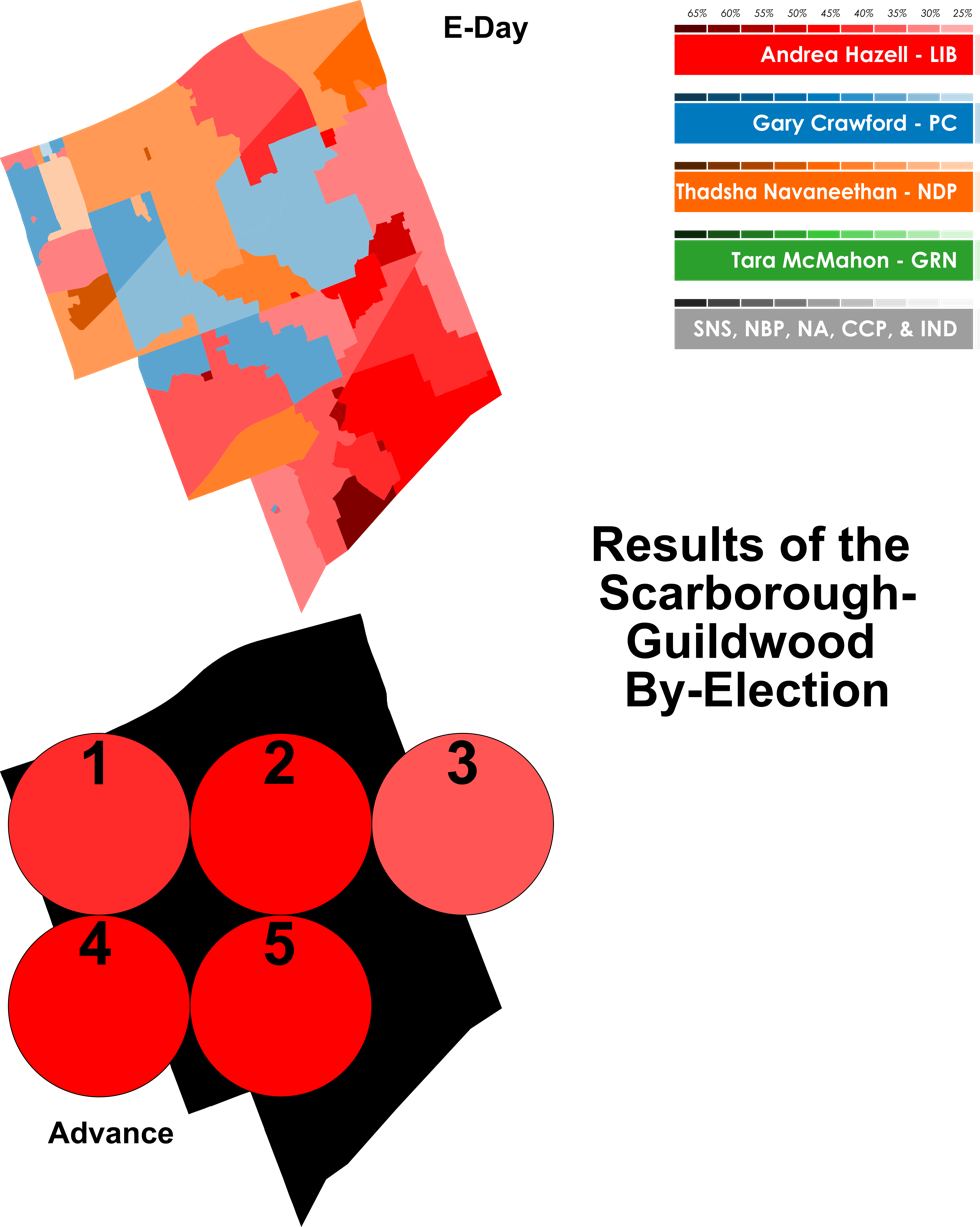
MPP before election
Mitzie Hunter
Liberal
Elected MPP
Andrea Hazell
Liberal

A by-election was held in the provincial riding of Scarborough—Guildwood in Ontario on July 27, 2023, to elect a new member of the Legislative Assembly of Ontario following the resignation of Liberal MPP Mitzie Hunter to run in the 2023 Toronto mayoral by-election. She came in sixth place. Andrea Hazell retained the seat for the Ontario Liberals.

The election was held on the same day as another in Kanata—Carleton.

== Background ==
Scarborough—Guildwood is a riding centred on the Guildwood neighbourhood.

== Candidates ==
Councillor Gary Crawford was selected as the PC candidate.

== Results ==
Ontario provincial by-election, July 27, 2023: Scarborough—Guildwood Resignation of Mitzie Hunter
Party	Candidate	Votes	%	±%	Expenditures
Liberal	Andrea Hazell	5,640	36.55	–9.75	$85,245
Progressive Conservative	Gary Crawford	4,562	29.57	–1.95	$57,878
New Democratic	Thadsha Navaneethan	4,041	26.19	+9.53	$80,598
Stop the New Sex-Ed Agenda	Tony Walton	508	3.29	–	$26,608
New Blue	Danielle Height	151	0.98	–0.29	$10,691
Green	Tara McMahon	146	0.95	–1.88	$0
No Affiliation	Reginald Tull	139	0.90	–	$8,266
Canadians' Choice	Paul Fromm	66	0.43	–	$0
Independent	Kevin Clarke	57	0.37	–0.14	$7,002
Independent	Habiba Desai	52	0.34	–	$0
Independent	Abu Alam	48	0.31	–	$395
Independent	John Turmel	20	0.13	–	$0
Total valid votes		15,430	99.49		
Total rejected, unmarked and declined ballots		79	0.51	–0.37	
Turnout		15,509	21.88	–19.75	
Eligible voters		70,893			
Liberal hold		Swing		–3.90	
Source: Elections Ontario

== See also ==
- List of Ontario by-elections
