= On the Rocket =

- Genre: Transit News in Toronto
- Starring: Adam Giambrone
- Country of origin: Canada
- Original language: English

Production
- Production locations: Toronto, Ontario, Canada

Original release
- Network: CablePulse 24
- Release: November 5, 2009

On The Rocket is a monthly television talk show that is aired on CP24 in Toronto, Ontario, Canada. It broadcasts live on a chartered TTC streetcar. The program was first hosted by Toronto Transit Commission (TTC) chair and Toronto City Councillor Adam Giambrone. During the January 21, 2010 broadcast Giambrone revealed that he would no longer be the host due to the upcoming municipal election. At the time of that broadcast a new host had not been named, and the future of the program is unknown. In March 2010, Giambrone remained the host of On The Rocket and it continues to air on CP24.

The route the streetcar takes varies and viewers are invited to get on and off for a free ride and to participate in the live broadcast. The streetcar departs from the McCaul loop on McCaul Street, north of Queen Street (near CP24's headquarters at 299 Queen Street West) at 8 p.m. EST on the night of the broadcast. The program first aired on November 5, 2009.
