= Bob Wong =

Canadian politician (1941–2025)

The Honourable Bob Wong ECO

Ontario MPP
- In office 1987–1990
- Preceded by: Riding established
- Succeeded by: Rosario Marchese
- Constituency: Fort York

Personal details
- Born: Robert Charles Wong; April 27, 1941 Fort Erie, Ontario, Canada
- Died: December 16, 2025 (aged 84)
- Party: Liberal
- Education: Victoria University, Toronto; Schulich School of Business; Harvard University
- Occupation: Former politician, Businessman, Private Wealth Management Advisor and Portfolio Manager

Robert Charles Wong ECO (Chinese: 黃景培; April 27, 1941 – December 16, 2025) was a Canadian politician in Ontario. He was the first Canadian of Chinese descent to be elected to the Legislative Assembly of Ontario, represented the downtown Toronto riding of Fort York from 1987 and 1999 as a Liberal. He served as a cabinet minister in the provincial government of David Peterson, making him the first Canadian of Chinese descent to serve in a provincial cabinet.

== Background ==
Wong was educated at the University of Toronto, York University, Harvard University, and the University of Waterloo, earning Bachelor of Science and M.B.A. degrees. He was a special assistant of the minister of national health and welfare, John Munro, from 1968 to 1970. He also served as special advisor to Stanley Haidasz, Canada's first minister of state for multiculturalism in 1972. Wong later served as president of the Toronto District Liberal Association from 1974 to 1976, and of the Ontario Chinese Liberal Association in 1986. He also chaired the Toronto Ontario Olympic Committee, and was a member of the Multicultural Advisory Council.

In private life, Wong served as chair of Goulding, Rose & Turner Ltd., and was a director of May Mikkila Inc., Abico Management Ltd., Multilingual Television Ltd., Channel 47 Toronto (Canada's first multilingual television station) and Sky Continental Management Inc. He established the first brokerage office in Toronto's Chinatown, and was named analyst of the year for 1980 by Financial Times of Canada. He also is the author of "Computing: An Introduction" and the co-author of "Algorithms", both published in 1967.

== Politics ==
Wong was elected to the Ontario legislature in the 1987 provincial election, defeating Joe Pantalone of the New Democratic Party (NDP) by 137 votes in the downtown Toronto riding of Fort York. His election made him the first Canadian of Chinese descent elected to Queen's Park, and the fifth Chinese Canadian to hold elected office at the federal (after Douglas Jung and Art Lee, elected from Vancouver in 1957 and 1974 respectively) or provincial levels (after George Ho Lem and Henry Woo, both elected to the Legislative Assembly of Alberta in the 1970s).

He was appointed to cabinet on September 29, 1987 as minister of energy. On August 2, 1989, he was named minister of citizenship responsible for race relations, multiculturalism and the Ontario Human Rights Commission. He is the second visible minority person to serve in the Ontario provincial cabinet, and the first Chinese Canadian cabinet minister in Canada.

The Liberals were defeated by the NDP in the 1990 provincial election, and Wong lost the Fort York riding by about 1,500 votes to Rosario Marchese. He sought to return to the legislature in the 1995 election, but lost again to Marchese by over 2,000 votes.

Wong supported Gerard Kennedy for the leadership of the Ontario Liberal Party in 1996.

=== Cabinet positions ===
Peterson ministry, Province of Ontario (1985–1990)
Cabinet posts (2)
Predecessor	Office	Successor
Gerry Phillips	Minister of citizenship 1989–1990 also Responsible for Race Relations and Ontario Human Rights Commission	Elaine Ziemba
Vince Kerrio	Minister of energy 1987–1989	Lyn McLeod

== Later life and death ==
Wong was later appointed chair of the Canadian Automobile Association (CAA) Ontario's Government and Public Affairs Committee. He was later vice-chairman and portfolio manager with Leon Frazer & Associates, and was a board member of the Royal Ontario Museum.

Wong died on December 16, 2025, at the age of 84.

== See also ==
- List of University of Waterloo people
