= Andrea Hazell =

Canadian politician

Andrea Hazell MPP
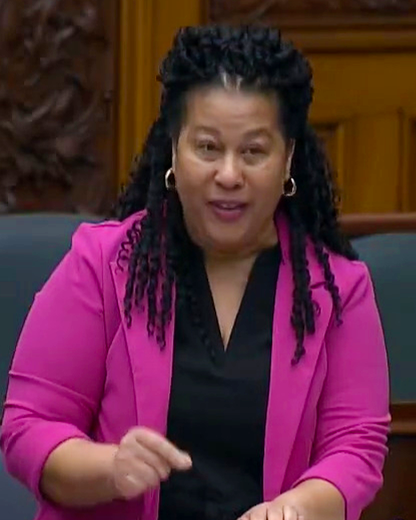
- Hazell in 2024

Member of the Ontario Provincial Parliament for Scarborough—Guildwood
- Incumbent
- Assumed office July 27, 2023
- Preceded by: Mitzie Hunter

Personal details
- Party: Ontario Liberal
- Occupation: financial management

Andrea Hazell is a Canadian politician, who was elected to the Legislative Assembly of Ontario in the 2023 Scarborough—Guildwood provincial by-election. She represents the electoral district of Scarborough—Guildwood as a member of the Ontario Liberal Party.

== Career ==
Before politics Hazell managed her own financial management firm. She is president and chair of the Scarborough Business Association and chair of the Caribbean Philanthropic Council.

As of July 7, 2024, she serves as the Liberal Party critic for Transportation, for Multiculturalism, and for Women's Issues.

== Electoral record ==
2025 Ontario general election: Scarborough—Guildwood
Party	Candidate	Votes	%	±%
Liberal	Andrea Hazell	13,813	51.02	+14.47
Progressive Conservative	Jude Aloysius	10,224	37.76	+8.20
New Democratic	Christian Keay	1,811	6.69	–19.50
Green	Tara McMahon	661	2.44	+1.50
New Blue	Anthony Internicola	298	1.10	+0.12
Independent	Kevin Clarke	169	0.62	+0.25
Independent	Kingsley Cato	98	0.36	–
Total valid votes		27,074	99.13	
Total rejected, unmarked and declined ballots		237	0.87	+0.36
Turnout		27,311	38.63	+16.75
Eligible voters		70,700		
Liberal hold		Swing		+3.13
Source: Elections Ontario

Ontario provincial by-election, July 27, 2023: Scarborough—Guildwood Resignation of Mitzie Hunter
Party	Candidate	Votes	%	±%	Expenditures
Liberal	Andrea Hazell	5,640	36.55	–9.75	$85,245
Progressive Conservative	Gary Crawford	4,562	29.57	–1.95	$57,878
New Democratic	Thadsha Navaneethan	4,041	26.19	+9.53	$80,598
Stop the New Sex-Ed Agenda	Tony Walton	508	3.29	–	$26,608
New Blue	Danielle Height	151	0.98	–0.29	$10,691
Green	Tara McMahon	146	0.95	–1.88	$0
No Affiliation	Reginald Tull	139	0.90	–	$8,266
Canadians' Choice	Paul Fromm	66	0.43	–	$0
Independent	Kevin Clarke	57	0.37	–0.14	$7,002
Independent	Habiba Desai	52	0.34	–	$0
Independent	Abu Alam	48	0.31	–	$395
Independent	John Turmel	20	0.13	–	$0
Total valid votes		15,430	99.49		
Total rejected, unmarked and declined ballots		79	0.51	–0.37	
Turnout		15,509	21.88	–19.75	
Eligible voters		70,893			
Liberal hold		Swing		–3.90	
Source: Elections Ontario
