= Trinity—Spadina (provincial electoral district) =

Former provincial electoral district in Ontario, Canada

Coordinates: 43.652°N 79.406°W

Ontario electoral district
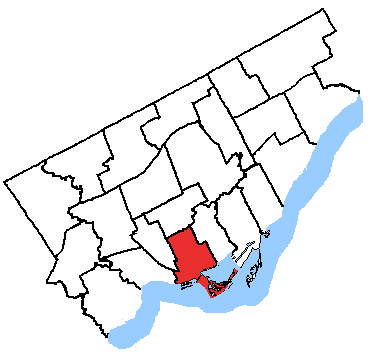
- Trinity—Spadina in relation to the other Toronto ridings

Defunct provincial electoral district
- Legislature: Legislative Assembly of Ontario
- District created: 1999
- First contested: 1999
- Last contested: 2014

Demographics
- Population (2011): 144,733
- Electors (2011): 96,793
- Area (km²): 18.55
- Census division: Toronto
- Census subdivision: Toronto

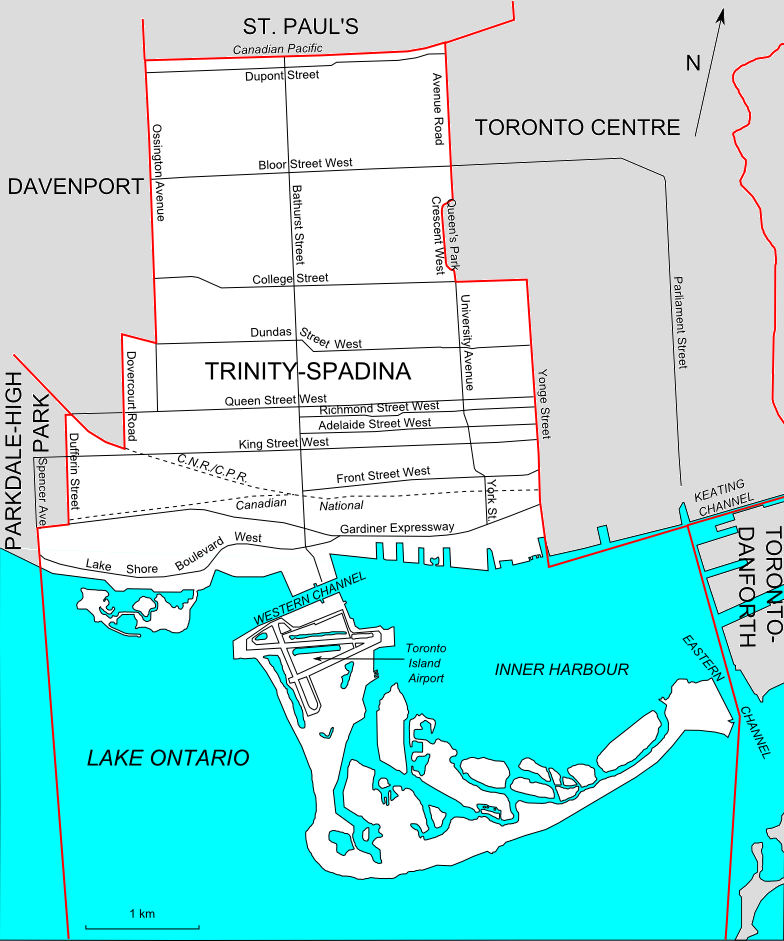
Map of Trinity-Spadina

Trinity—Spadina was a provincial electoral district in Ontario, Canada, that was represented in the Legislative Assembly of Ontario since 1999.

The electoral district was created in 1999 when provincial ridings were defined to have the same borders as federal ridings. It generally encompasses the western portion of Downtown Toronto. In the 2001 Canadian census, the riding had 106,094 people of which 74,409 were eligible to vote.

Its Member of Provincial Parliament (MPP) elect is Chris Glover of the Ontario New Democratic Party, who unseated short lived MPP Han Dong in the 2018 general election.

Major landmarks within the riding include the western portion of the University of Toronto, the CN Tower, Rogers Centre (formerly Skydome), Air Canada Centre, the Canadian Broadcasting Centre, 299 Queen Street West, the Toronto Eaton Centre, the Metro Toronto Convention Centre, Toronto City Hall, Kensington Market, Chinatown, Christie Pits, Trinity Bellwoods Park and Palmerston Boulevard.

The riding is one of the most ethnically diverse in Canada containing the heart of Toronto's Chinatown, Koreatown, Little Italy and Little Portugal. The northern section of the riding is the trendy Annex district, while the eastern edge contains part of the University of Toronto and thousands of students. The riding has been the most left-leaning in Toronto and has voted NDP provincially for a number of years.

In 2018, the district was dissolved into Spadina—Fort York, University—Rosedale and Toronto Centre.

== Demographics ==
Average family income: $81,415
Median family income: $50,047
Unemployment: 6.7%
Language (mother tongue): English - 51%, French - 2%, Other - 45%, Multiple (Incl. English and/or French) - 2%
Language (knowledge): English only - 75.3%, French only - < 0.1%, English and French - 15.4%, Neither English nor French - 9.1%
Religion: Catholic - 32.1%, Protestant - 15%, other Christian (Incl. Orthodox) - 5.3%, Buddhist - 5.2%, Jewish - 4.2%, Muslim - 2.8%, No religious affiliation - 32.9%, Other - 2.4%
Visible Minority: Chinese - 18.2%, Black - 4%, South Asian - 3.5%, Southeast Asian - 1.8%, Filipino - 1.7%, Korean - 1.5%, Latin American - 1.5%, Others - 3.3%
Immigrant Status: Non-immigrant - 52%, Immigrant - 45%, Non-permanent resident - 3%

== Geography ==
It consists of the Toronto Islands and the part of the City of Toronto bounded on the south by Toronto Harbour, and on the west, north and east by a line drawn from the harbour north on Spencer Avenue, east along the Gardiner Expressway, north on Dufferin, east on Queen Street West, southeast along the Canadian Pacific Railway line, north along Dovercourt Road, east along Dundas Street West, north along Ossington Avenue, east along the Canadian Pacific Railway situated north of Dupont Street, south along Avenue Road and Queens Park Crescent West, east along College Street and south along Yonge Street to the harbour.

These borders were changed in the 2004 redistribution. The northwestern corner, a generally pro-NDP area was lost to Davenport. A large, but mostly business area of Toronto Centre—Rosedale between University Avenue and Yonge St. was added to the riding. This region tends to support the Liberals. The Toronto Islands were also added to the riding from Toronto Centre—Rosedale. This area is very strongly NDP and while it has a small population it is a highly activist one that provides many campaign workers for the New Democrats.

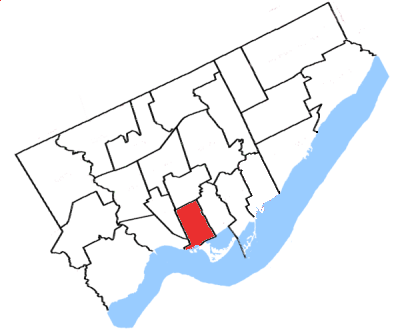
The boundaries in place from 1999 to 2003

== Members of Provincial Parliament ==
Trinity—Spadina
Assembly	Years	Member	Party
Riding created from Fort York, St. Andrew—St. Patrick and Dovercourt
37th	1999–2003	Rosario Marchese	New Democratic
38th	2003–2007	Rosario Marchese	New Democratic
39th	2007–2011	Rosario Marchese	New Democratic
40th	2011–2014	Rosario Marchese	New Democratic
41st	2014–2018	Han Dong	Liberal
Riding dissolved into Spadina—Fort York, University—Rosedale and Toronto Centre
Sourced from the Ontario Legislative Assembly

== Election results ==
2014 Ontario general election
Party	Candidate	Votes	%	±%
Liberal	Han Dong	26,935	46.28	+6.35
New Democratic	Rosario Marchese	17,759	30.51	-11.85
Progressive Conservative	Roberta Scott	8,094	13.91	+2.35
Green	Tim Grant	4,111	7.06	+1.91
Libertarian	Andrew Echevarria	729	1.25	
Vegan Environmental	Paul Figueiras	308	0.53	
Special Needs	Dan King	265	0.46	+0.16
Total valid votes		58,200	100.0	
Liberal gain from New Democratic		Swing		9.10
Source: Elections Ontario

2011 Ontario general election
Party	Candidate	Votes	%	±%
New Democratic	Rosario Marchese	19,870	42.36	+1.21
Liberal	Sarah Thomson	18,731	39.93	+8.40
Progressive Conservative	Mike Yen	5,420	11.56	-2.30
Green	Tim Grant	2,415	5.15	-6.31
Special Needs	Danish Ahmed	139	0.30	-0.24
Freedom	Silvio Ursomarzo	126	0.27	-0.06
Socialist	Guy Fogel	117	0.25	
Human Rights	Abara Ocran-Caesar	88	0.19	
Total valid votes		46,906	100.00	
Total rejected, unmarked and declined ballots		205	0.44	
Turnout		47,111	43.00	
Eligible voters		109,565		
New Democratic hold		Swing		-3.60
Source: Elections Ontario

2007 Ontario general election
Party	Candidate	Votes	%	±%
New Democratic	Rosario Marchese	18,508	41.15	-6.36
Liberal	Kathryn Holloway	14,180	31.53	-0.35
Progressive Conservative	Tyler Currie	6,235	13.86	+1.57
Green	Dan King	5,156	11.46	+5.64
Independent	George Sawinson	350	0.78	
Special Needs	John Rubino	243	0.54	
Independent	Charlene Cottle	154	0.34	
Freedom	Silvio Ursomarzo	147	0.33	
Total valid votes			100.00	

2003 Ontario general election
Party	Candidate	Votes	%	±%
New Democratic	Rosario Marchese	19,268	47.51	-0.38
Liberal	Nellie Pedro	12,927	31.88	+4.4
Progressive Conservative	Helena Guergis	4,985	12.29	-8.21
Green	Greg Laxton	2,362	5.82	+4.11
Libertarian	Judson Glober	756	1.86	
Independent	Nick Lin	256	0.63	
Total valid votes		40,554	100.0	

1999 Ontario general election
Party	Candidate	Votes	%
New Democratic	Rosario Marchese	17,110	47.89
Liberal	Albert Koehl	9,817	27.48
Progressive Conservative	Chris Loreto	7,323	20.50
Green	Sat K. S. Khalsa	612	1.71
Natural Law	Ron Robins	274	0.77
Independent	Roberto Verdecchia	258	0.72
Freedom	Silvio Ursomarzo	182	0.51
Independent	Raymond Samuels	154	0.43
Total valid votes		35,730	100.0

== 2007 electoral reform referendum ==
2007 Ontario electoral reform referendum
Side	Votes	%
First Past the Post	17,787	40.8
Mixed member proportional	25,757	59.2
Total valid votes	43,544	100.0

- This riding was one of five ridings where a majority of voters supported MMP.

== City Councillors ==
Municipally, Trinity—Spadina is divided into two wards; the western half, Ward 19, is represented by Mike Layton (son of the late and former Canadian federal New Democratic leader Jack Layton), and the eastern half, Ward 20, is represented by Ceta Ramkhalawansingh. In Toronto's 2010 municipal elections, Adam Vaughan was re-elected for a second four-year term; the previous Ward 19 Councillor, Joe Pantalone, stood (unsuccessfully) for mayor. Ramkhalawansingh was appointed by Council after Vaughan ran successfully in the 2014 Ontario election.

Metro Ward 20

- Joe Pantalone 1980–January 1, 1998

Metro Ward 24

- Olivia Chow - 1991–January 1, 1998

Toronto Ward 24

- Olivia Chow - 1998–2000

Toronto Ward 19

- Joe Pantalone January 1, 1998 – 2010
- Mike Layton 2010-

Toronto Ward 20

- Olivia Chow - 2000–2006; 2006
- Martin Silva 2006
- Adam Vaughan 2006–2014
- Ceta Ramkhalawansingh 2014–present

Toronto Ward 4

- Martin Silva 1988–January 1, 1998
- William Peyton Hubbard 1894–1915

Toronto Ward 5

- Dan Leckie January 1, 1994 – January 1, 1998

== Sources ==
- Elections Ontario Past Election Results
