= Fort York (provincial electoral district) =

Former provincial electoral district in Ontario, Canada

Ontario electoral district

Defunct provincial electoral district
- Legislature: Legislative Assembly of Ontario
- District created: 1987
- District abolished: 1999
- First contested: 1987
- Last contested: 1995

Demographics
- Census division: Toronto
- Census subdivision: Toronto

Fort York was a provincial electoral district in Toronto, Ontario, Canada. It was created in 1987 and was subsequently abolished in 1999 when the ridings were redistributed to match their federal counterparts. The riding had only two representatives, Bob Wong, who was elected in the 1987 provincial election, and Rosario Marchese, who defeated Mr Wong in the 1990 provincial election. Marchese was subsequently re-elected when the riding was redistributed and renamed Trinity-Spadina prior to the 1999 provincial election.

== Boundaries ==
The riding occupied the central downtown area of Toronto. The western border zigzagged from the Lake along Atlantic Avenue, Dovercourt Road and Ossington Avenue to Bloor Street. It then followed Bloor east to Bathurst Street, then south on Bathurst to College Street, then east on College and then on Carlton Street past Yonge Street to Sherbourne Street. It then went south on Sherbourne to the lake. It then followed the lakeshore west back to Atlantic. The riding also included the Toronto Islands.

== Members of Provincial Parliament ==
Fort York
Assembly	Years	Member	Party
Created from parts of St. Andrew—St. Patrick, Dovercourt, Bellwoods, and St. George in 1987
34th	1987–1990	Bob Wong	Liberal
35th	1990–1995	Rosario Marchese	New Democratic
36th	1995–1999	Rosario Marchese	New Democratic
Sourced from the Ontario Legislative Assembly
Merged into Trinity—Spadina and Toronto Centre after 1996

== Electoral results ==
1995 Ontario general election
Party	Candidate	Votes	%	±%
New Democratic	Rosario Marchese	10,762	41.02	–5.29
Liberal	Bob Wong	8,482	32.33	–8.23
Progressive Conservative	Jacob Joel Ginsberg	6,025	22.96	+13.48
Green	Kevin Ells	300	1.14	–
Libertarian	Paul N. G. Barker	266	1.01	–1.25
Independent	Matthew Shepherd	140	0.53	–
Natural Law	Maurice F. Seguin	133	0.51	–
Independent	John Brian Steele	129	0.49	–
Total valid votes		26,237	98.31	
Total rejected, unmarked and declined ballots		452	1.69	+0.07
Turnout		26,689	64.86	+1.38
Eligible voters		41,147		
New Democratic hold		Swing		+1.47
Source: Elections Ontario

1990 Ontario general election
Party	Candidate	Votes	%	±%
New Democratic	Rosario Marchese	11,023	46.30	+3.95
Liberal	Bob Wong	9,656	40.56	–2.41
Progressive Conservative	John Pepall	2,258	9.49	+0.15
Libertarian	Paul N. G. Barker	539	2.26	+0.35
Independent	Ronald G. Rodgers	330	1.39	+0.70
Total valid votes		23,806	98.38	
Total rejected, unmarked and declined ballots		392	1.62	+0.46
Turnout		24,198	63.48	+5.25
Eligible voters		38,117		
New Democratic gain from Liberal		Swing		+3.18
Source: Elections Ontario

1987 Ontario general election
Party	Candidate	Votes	%
Liberal	Bob Wong	9,593	42.97
New Democratic	Joe Pantalone	9,456	42.36
Progressive Conservative	Tom Pang	2,084	9.34
Libertarian	Paul N. G. Barker	427	1.91
Green	Andrew Scorer	243	1.09
Freedom	Glen J. Magder	186	0.83
Independent	Bill J. Whelan	181	0.81
Independent	Ronald G. Rodgers	154	0.69
Total valid votes		22,324	98.84
Total rejected ballots		261	1.16
Turnout		22,585	58.24
Eligible voters		38,782	
Liberal pickup new district.			
Source: Elections Ontario

== See also ==
- List of Ontario provincial electoral districts
- Canadian provincial electoral districts
