= Rosario Marchese =

Canadian politician

The Honourable Rosario Marchese ECO
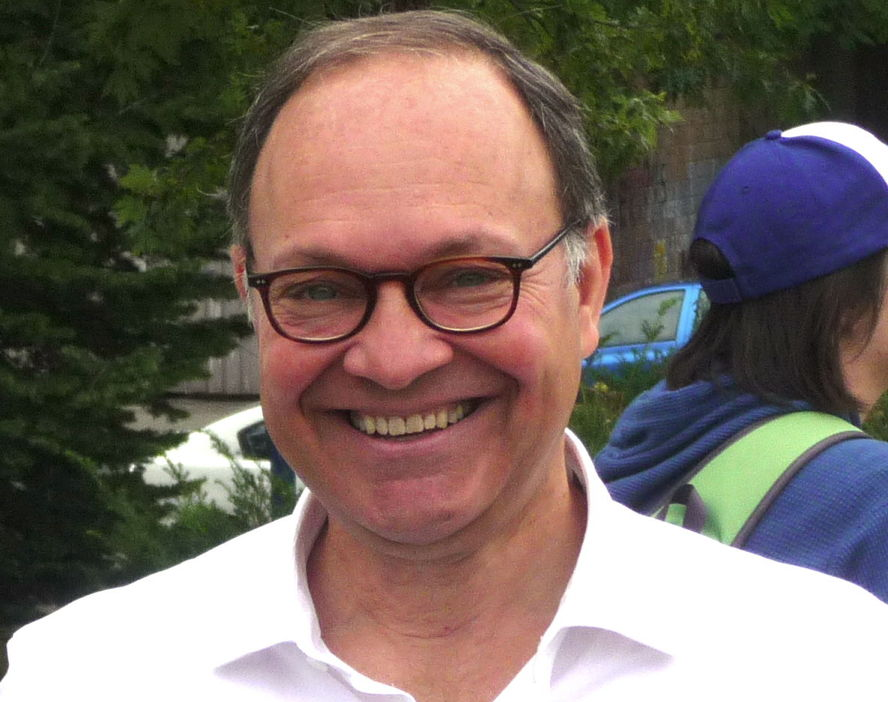
- Rosario Marchese in 2009

Member of the Ontario Provincial Parliament for Trinity—Spadina Fort York (1990-1999)
- In office September 6, 1990 – May 2, 2014
- Preceded by: Bob Wong
- Succeeded by: Han Dong

Toronto School Trustee for Ward 4
- In office 1982–1990

Personal details
- Born: January 1, 1952 (age 74) San Nicola da Crissa, Italy
- Party: New Democrat
- Spouse: Marija (sep.)
- Children: 3
- Occupation: Teacher

Rosario Marchese (born January 1, 1952) is a former Canadian politician in Ontario, Canada. He was a New Democratic member of the Legislative Assembly of Ontario from 1990 to 2014, representing the downtown Toronto riding of Trinity-Spadina and before that the old riding of Fort York.

== Background ==
Born in San Nicola da Crissa, Calabria, Marchese arrived in Canada with his family in 1961. He received a Bachelor of Arts degree in English, French and Philosophy from the University of Toronto in 1978, and later received a Bachelor of Education degree. He taught English and French in Toronto and Mississauga. He is also fluent in Italian. As well, he served as Vice-President of the National Congress of Italian Canadians (Toronto), Toronto Public Library Board trustee, and Multilingual Literacy Centre Chair.

== Political life ==
In 1980, he ran for school trustee in Ward 4 but finished third behind incumbents Patrick Case and Peter Davis. (Note: In this election two trustees were elected to each ward.) In 1982 he ran again this time being elected. He ran as a New Democrat aligned trustee. (Note: School trustee elections don't run on a party system but individual trustees could run claiming alignment with a particular party.)

He served on the Toronto school board from 1982 to 1990. During this period, he was an advocate of lingual and racial rights, worked to establish international language programs, alternative schools and school childcare, and helped to end the practice of streaming students into narrow learning programs.

In 1985 and again in 1988, Marchese voted with other trustees to raise their salaries 35% and 86% respectively. By the end of 1988 salaries had increased from about $18,000 to $44,000. Trustees who supported the increase argued that the salary was too low to attract good candidates. Sheila Cary-Meagher, said, "You have to stop and think... about the people who want to run for the job and who, if we keep it a rich person's ghetto, can't do it," she said. In both years trustees rejected citizen recommendations for lower increases.

=== Provincial politics ===
In 1990, Marchese was elected to the Ontario parliament in the provincial election of 1990, defeating incumbent Liberal Bob Wong by about 1500 votes in the riding of Fort York.

The NDP won a majority government and Marchese was appointed as the Minister of Culture and Communications on October 1, 1990. One of his first acts as minister was to announce the withdrawal of provincial funds for a proposed opera house in Toronto. Even though the province gave the land to the city for the opera house it was never built. He presided over a significant increase in funding to the Ontario Arts Council and the provincial film industry, but was dropped from cabinet on July 31, 1991. Critics argued that he was dropped from cabinet because he promoted multiculturalism at the expense of some mainstream arts groups.

As a replacement for his cabinet position, Marchese was appointed as parliamentary assistant to Premier Bob Rae focusing on constitutional affairs. In this position he was a proponent of adding a 'social charter' to the Canadian constitution. This would have promoted equal opportunities, reduce disparities and maintain equalization payments.

In June 1994, he introduced a private member's bill to give Toronto the ability to regulate after hours clubs. The party decided to take over the bill and expanded it to encompass the entire province. It was passed on November 24, 1994.

=== Cabinet positions ===
Rae ministry, Province of Ontario (1990–1995)
Cabinet post (1)
| Predecessor | Office | Successor |
| Hugh O'Neil | Minister of Culture and Communications; 1990–1991 | Karen Haslam |

=== In opposition ===
The NDP were defeated in the 1995 election, although Marchese managed to increase his margin of victory against Wong who ran again for the Liberals. In opposition, he managed to distinguish himself as one of the most spirited debaters in the reduced NDP caucus. In the 1999 provincial election he ran in the new riding of Trinity—Spadina and easily won. He was re-elected in 2003, 2007 and 2011. During his tenure in opposition he served as critic for several portfolios and was NDP caucus chair from 2007 to 2014.

In the 2014 provincial election, he was defeated by Liberal candidate Han Dong by 9,175 votes.
