= The Peoples Political Party =

Provincial political party in Ontario

- Leader: Troy Young
- President: Kevin Clarke
- Deputy Leader: Karen Lee Wilde
- Founder: Kevin Clarke
- Founded: September 13, 2011
- Dissolved: 2023
- Headquarters: 907-4301 Kingston Rd, Scarborough, Ontario, M1E 2N1
- Colours: Dark cyan
- Seats in Legislature: 0 / 125

Website
- www.thepeopleofontario.ca

The Peoples Political Party, abbreviated as The People, was a minor political party in the Canadian province of Ontario founded in 2011 by perennial candidate Kevin Clarke. It was deregistered in early 2023.

== Platform ==
Third election in one year, and until now, what [sic] heard from the politicians amount [sic] to just political bullshit. This time, "the people" have a voice.

— Kevin Clarke, Peoples Political Party Website

The party accuses the three major parties of having economic policies that benefit themselves and an elite minority rather than the province as a whole. The main goal of the party is to ensure that "the day to day needs of all in this city and province" are accommodated. The party suggests that it "will focus on the service of government with people-oriented processes, supporting the needs of humanity", and it supports youth initiatives and employment in addition to increased investment in culture, including the arts, sports, and tourism.

== Name dispute with the People's Party of Canada ==
In 2021, there were attempts by the federal People's Party of Canada (PPC) to register the name "People's Party of Ontario" with Elections Ontario. The elections agency rejected the name five times due to its similarity to the existing Peoples Political Party. In March 2021, the PPC and Clarke discussed Clarke relinquishing his rights to the name in exchange for running under the PPC banner. The discussions, while initially productive, later broke down after Clarke posted about the matter on social media and added other people to his email conversations with the PPC, with the PPC asking for the posts to be deleted; Clarke questioned the motives of the PPC, saying "Hold it, you're supposed to be the People’s Party, and you want to keep things away from the people?" in an interview with the Toronto Star.

== Election results ==
The party failed to win any seats in the 2022 Ontario general election.

Election results by year
Election	Leader	Seats contested	Seats won	+/-	Votes	%	Rank	Status/Gov.
2011	Kevin Clarke	4 / 107	0 / 107	Steady	386	<0.01%	15th	Extra-parliamentary
2014	Kevin Clarke	5 / 107	0 / 107	Steady	▲894	▲0.02%	▲12th	Extra-parliamentary
2018	Kevin Clarke	6 / 124	0 / 124	Steady	▼628	▼0.01%	▼19th	Extra-parliamentary

In the 2011 Ontario general election, the Peoples Political Party nominated four candidates for the Legislative Assembly of Ontario:

2011 Ontario general election
Riding	Candidate's Name	Notes	Votes	%	Rank
Toronto Centre	Phil Sarazen		29	0.06%	10/10
Niagara West—Glanbrook	Marty Poos		158	0.32%	7/9
Parkdale—High Park	Thomas Zaugg		55	0.14%	9/10
Toronto—Danforth	Kevin Clarke	Party Leader	143	0.38%	6/9

The party nominated candidates in the 6 September 2012 by-elections in Vaughan and Kitchener—Waterloo for the Legislative Assembly of Ontario.

2012 Ontario by-elections
Riding	Candidate's name	Notes	Votes	%	Rank
Vaughan	Phil Sarazen		77	0.24	9/9
Kitchener—Waterloo	Kevin Clarke		48	0.1	9/10

The party nominated candidates in the 13 February 2014 by-elections in Niagara Falls and Thornhill for the Legislative Assembly of Ontario.

2014 Ontario by-elections
Riding	Candidate's name	Notes	Votes	%	Rank
Niagara Falls	Troy Young		107	0.29	7/8
Thornhill	Kevin Clarke		144	0.52	7/8

The Peoples Political Party nominated several candidates in the 2018 Ontario general election for the Legislative Assembly of Ontario.

2018 Ontario general election
Riding	Candidate's name	Notes	Votes	%	Rank
Scarborough—Guildwood	Heather Dunbar		150	0.42	8/9
Beaches—East York	Tony Chipman		58	0.12	11/11
Davenport	Troy J. Young		96	0.21	8/9
Niagara Centre	Dario Smagata-Bryan		133	0.27	8/8
Scarborough—Agincourt	Badih (Bill) Rawdah		92	0.25	9/9
Toronto Centre	Kevin Clarke		97	0.22	9/10
