= Toronto Centre (provincial electoral district) =

Provincial electoral district in Ontario, Canada

Coordinates: 43.661°N 79.369°W

Ontario electoral district
- Location in Toronto

Provincial electoral district
- Legislature: Legislative Assembly of Ontario
MPP
Kristyn Wong-Tam
New Democratic
- District created: 1996
- First contested: 1999
- Last contested: 2025

Demographics
- Population (2021): 119,901
- Electors (2018): 82,044
- Area (km²): 6
- Pop. density (per km²): 19,983.5
- Census division: Toronto
- Census subdivision: Toronto

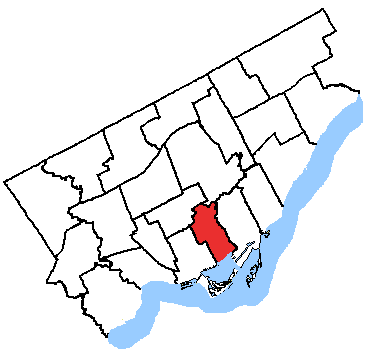
Toronto Centre from 2003 to 2018

Toronto Centre is a provincial electoral district in Toronto, Ontario, Canada. Since 1999, it has elected one member to the Legislative Assembly of Ontario.

It was created in 1999 as Toronto Centre—Rosedale from most of St. George—St. David and parts of St. Andrew—St. Patrick, Fort York, when ridings were redistributed to match their federal counterparts.

From 1999 to 2007, the riding included the area of Toronto from Avenue Road / University Avenue in the west to the Don River and the city limits in the east and the Mount Pleasant Cemetery and the CPR in the north.

In 2007, the riding was abolished and redistributed mostly into Toronto Centre. It lost the area west of Yonge Street and south of College Street plus Toronto Island to Trinity—Spadina. It also gained some parts of Toronto—Danforth as the riding's east border was altered to continue along the Don River past the former city limits to Pottery Road to Bayview Avenue to the CPR. Another boundary change altered the borders around the Rosehill Reservoir.

The Ontario Legislative Building was located within this district until the 2015 electoral redistribution.

== Members of Provincial Parliament ==
Assembly	Years	Member	Party
Toronto Centre—Rosedale; Riding created from St. Andrew—St. Patrick, St. George—St. David and Fort York
37th	1999–2003	George Smitherman	Liberal
38th	2003–2007	George Smitherman	Liberal
Toronto Centre
39th	2007–2010	George Smitherman	Liberal
39th	2010–2011	Glen Murray	Liberal
40th	2011–2014	Glen Murray	Liberal
41st	2014–2017	Glen Murray	Liberal
42nd	2018–2022	Suze Morrison	New Democratic
43rd	2022–2025	Kristyn Wong-Tam	New Democratic
44th	2025–present	Kristyn Wong-Tam	New Democratic
Sourced from the Ontario Legislative Assembly

== Election results ==
=== 2025 ===
Winning party in each polling division of Toronto Centre riding at the 2025 Ontario general election

2025 Ontario general election
Party	Candidate	Votes	%	±%	Expenditures
New Democratic	Kristyn Wong-Tam	17,415	44.50	+0.73	$121,768
Liberal	Holly Rasky	14,152	36.16	–0.55	$40,537
Progressive Conservative	Ruth Farkas	5,692	14.54	+2.38	$953
Green	Andrew Massey	1,054	2.69	–2.42	$1,543
Progress	Sana Ahmad	381	0.97	N/A	$0
New Blue	Steve Hoehlmann	290	0.74	–0.36	$0
Independent	Cory Deville	151	0.39	N/A	$0
Total valid votes/expense limit		39,137	99.22	–0.14	$149,118
Total rejected, unmarked, and declined ballots		309	0.78	+0.14	
Turnout		39,446	43.61	+3.79	
Eligible voters		90,454			
New Democratic hold		Swing		+0.64	
Source: Elections Ontario

=== 2022 ===
Winning party in each polling division of Toronto Centre riding at the 2022 Ontario general election

2022 Ontario general election
Party	Candidate	Votes	%	±%	Expenditures
New Democratic	Kristyn Wong-Tam	15,285	43.77	−9.89	$117,371
Liberal	David Morris	12,820	36.71	+9.56	$86,950
Progressive Conservative	Jess Goddard	4,245	12.16	−1.96	$25,855
Green	Nicki Ward	1,784	5.11	+1.99	$13,592
New Blue	Steve Hoehlmann	385	1.10		$0
Communist	Ivan Byard	166	0.48		$0
None of the Above	Ron Shaw	131	0.38		$326
Stop the New Sex-Ed Agenda	Jennifer Snell	105	0.30	+0.07	$0
Total valid votes/expense limit		34,921	99.36	+0.27	$123,610
Total rejected, unmarked, and declined ballots		224	0.64	−0.27	
Turnout		35,145	39.82	−14.48	
Eligible voters		88,307			
New Democratic hold		Swing		−9.72	
Source(s): "Summary of Valid Votes Cast for Each Candidate" (PDF). Elections Ontario. 2022. Archived from the original on May 18, 2023.; "Statistical Summary by Electoral District" (PDF). Elections Ontario. 2022. Archived from the original on May 21, 2023.

=== 2018 ===
The Liberal incumbent Glen Murray resigned his seat effective September 1, 2017 to accept a position with the Pembina Institute, and the seat remained vacant until this election. In April 2018, PC candidate Meredith Cartwright hired actors to pretend to be Doug Ford supporters at the first provincial leader's debate.

2018 Ontario general election
Party	Candidate	Votes	%	±%
New Democratic	Suze Morrison	23,688	53.66	+34.35
Liberal	David Morris	11,986	27.15	–33.23
Progressive Conservative	Meredith Cartwright	6,234	14.12	+1.99
Green	Adam Sommerfeld	1,377	3.12	-1.60
Libertarian	Judi Falardeau	371	0.84	N/A
Special Needs	Dan King	117	0.27	N/A
New People's Choice	Cameron James	110	0.25	N/A
Stop the New Sex-Ed Agenda	Theresa Snell	102	0.23	N/A
People's Political Party	Kevin Clarke	98	0.22	N/A
Canadian Economic	Wanda Marie Fountain	65	0.15	N/A
Total valid votes		44,148	99.09	
Total rejected, unmarked and declined ballots		404	0.91	
Turnout		44,552	54.30	
Eligible voters		82,044		
New Democratic notional gain from Liberal		Swing		+33.79
Source: Elections Ontario

=== 2014 ===
2014 general election redistributed results
Party	Vote	%
Liberal	20,733	60.48
New Democratic	6,685	19.50
Progressive Conservative	4,177	12.18
Green	1,623	4.73
Others	1,065	3.11

2014 Ontario general election
Party	Candidate	Votes	%	±%
Liberal	Glen Murray	29,935	58.47	+3.23
Progressive Conservative	Martin Abell	9,498	18.55	+2.91
New Democratic	Kate Sellar	8,140	15.90	-9.40
Green	Mark Daye	2,265	4.42	+1.98
Libertarian	Judi Falardeau	551	1.08	+0.11
Special Needs	Lada Alekseychuk	200	0.39	
Communist	Drew Garvie	163	0.32	+0.04
Vegan Environmental	Harvey Rotenburg	152	0.30	+0.17
Freedom	Chris Goodwin	137	0.27	+0.32
Canadians' Choice	Bahman Yazdanfar	78	0.15	+0.11
People's Political Party	Robin Nurse	76	0.15	+0.10
Total valid votes		51,195	100.0	
Total rejected, unmarked and declined ballots		546	1.07	
Turnout		51,741	50.86	
Eligible voters		101,741		
Liberal hold		Swing		+0.16
Source: Elections Ontario

=== 2011 ===
2011 Ontario general election
Party	Candidate	Votes	%	±%
Liberal	Glen Murray	25,236	54.94	+7.77
New Democratic	Cathy Crowe	11,571	25.19	-8.22
Progressive Conservative	Martin Abell	7,186	15.64	+0.34
Green	Mark Daye	1,123	2.44	-0.57
Libertarian	Judi Falardeau	441	0.96	+0.57
Communist	Cathy Holliday	146	0.32	
Independent	Harvey Rotenberg	93	0.20	
Freedom	Christopher Goodwin	92	0.20	-0.03
People's Political Party	Phil Sarazen	29	0.06	
Independent	Bahman Yazdanfar	19	0.04	
Independent	Anne Abbott	withdrawn		
Total valid votes		45,936	100.00	
Total rejected, unmarked and declined ballots		286	0.62	
Turnout		46,222	48.42	
Eligible voters		95,466		
Liberal hold		Swing		+8.00
Source: Elections Ontario

=== 2010 by-election ===
On January 6, 2010, a provincial by-election was called in Toronto Centre to replace George Smitherman, who had resigned as MPP to run for mayor of Toronto. The by-election took place on February 4, 2010.

Ontario provincial by-election, February 4, 2010 (Resignation of George Smitherman) Resignation of George Smitherman
Party	Candidate	Votes	%	±%
Liberal	Glen Murray	12,289	47.17	-0.58
New Democratic	Cathy Crowe	8,705	33.41	+14.55
Progressive Conservative	Pamela Taylor	3,985	15.30	-5.11
Green	Stefan Premdas	783	3.01	-6.65
Libertarian	Heath Thomas	101	0.39	-1.10
Independent	John Turmel	66	0.25	
Independent	Raj Rama	63	0.24	
Freedom	Wayne Simmons	61	0.23	
Total valid votes		26,204	100.00	

=== 2007 ===
2007 Ontario general election
Party	Candidate	Votes	%	±%
Liberal	George Smitherman	21,522	47.85	−5.03
Progressive Conservative	Pamela Taylor	9,084	20.20	−1.63
New Democratic	Sandra Gonzalez	8,464	18.82	−1.28
Green	Mike McLean	4,412	9.81	5.82
Libertarian	Michael Green	686	1.53	
Special Needs	Danish Ahmed	259	0.58	
Communist	Johan Boyden	196	0.44	
Independent	Philip Fernandez	191	0.42	−0.37
Independent	Gary Leroux	167	0.37	
Total valid votes		44,981	100.00	
Total rejected, unmarked and declined ballots		457	1.02	
Turnout		45,438	49.90	
Eligible voters		91,050		

=== 2003 ===
2003 Ontario general election
Party	Candidate	Votes	%	±%
Liberal	George Smitherman	23,872	52.78	+13.88
Progressive Conservative	John Adams	9,968	22.04	-7.84
New Democratic	Gene Lara	9,112	20.14	+11.34
Green	Gabriel Draven	1,739	3.84	+2.98
Independent	Philip Fernandez	324	0.72	
Freedom	Silvio Ursomarzo	218	0.48	-0.27
Total valid votes		45,233	100.00	

=== 1999 ===
1999 Ontario general election
Party	Candidate	Votes	%
Liberal	George Smitherman	17,756	38.90
Progressive Conservative	Durhane Wong-Rieger	13,640	29.88
Independent	John Sewell	8,822	19.33
New Democratic	Helen Breslauer	4,019	8.80
Green	Joseph Cohen	392	0.86
Freedom	Paul McKeever	344	0.75
Independent	Mike Ryner	236	0.52
Family Coalition	Bill Whatcott	232	0.51
Natural Law	Ron Parker	205	0.45
Total valid votes		45,646	100.00

== Referendum results ==
=== 2007 ===
2007 Ontario electoral reform referendum
Side	Votes	%
First Past the Post	22,204	50.2
Mixed member proportional	22,070	49.8
Total valid votes	44,274	100.0

== See also ==
- List of Ontario provincial electoral districts
- Canadian provincial electoral districts

== Sources ==
- Elections Ontario Past Election Results
- Map of riding for 2018 election
