= Party for People with Special Needs =

Provincial political party in Canada

Party for People with Special Needs Parti pour les gens qui ont des besoins spéciaux
- Active provincial party
- Leader: Lionel Wayne Poizner
- President: Lionel Wayne Poizner
- Founded: 2007
- Headquarters: 94 Armour Blvd Toronto ON M3H 1L7
- Ideology: Recognition of people with disabilities as people with special needs
- Seats in Legislature: 0 / 107

Website
- partyforpeoplewithspecialneeds.ca

The Party for People with Special Needs (French: Parti pour les gens qui ont des besoins spéciaux) is a minor political party in Ontario, Canada, founded in 2007 and having contested the 2007 provincial election. The party ran two candidates, leader Danish Ahmed in Toronto Centre and John Rubino in Trinity—Spadina, neither of whom won.

PPSN was founded following a rule change regarding official party recognition; parties were required to only field two candidates to be registered, as opposed to the previous requirement of running candidates in half of all electoral districts. The party's mandate was to focus on the needs of people with disabilities. The party failed to win any seats in the 2022 Ontario general election.

== Election results ==
Election year	No. of overall votes	% of overall total	No. of candidates run	No. of seats won	+/−	Government
2007	502	0.01	2	0 / 107	New Party	Extra-parliamentary
2011	667	0.02	4	0 / 107	=	Extra-parliamentary
2014	709	0.01	3	0 / 107	=	Extra-parliamentary
2018	631	0.01	5	0 / 124	=	Extra-parliamentary
2022	290	0.01	2	0 / 124	=	Extra-parliamentary
2025	397	0.01	2	0 / 124	=	Extra-parliamentary
