= 43rd Parliament of Ontario =

←	42nd	44th	→
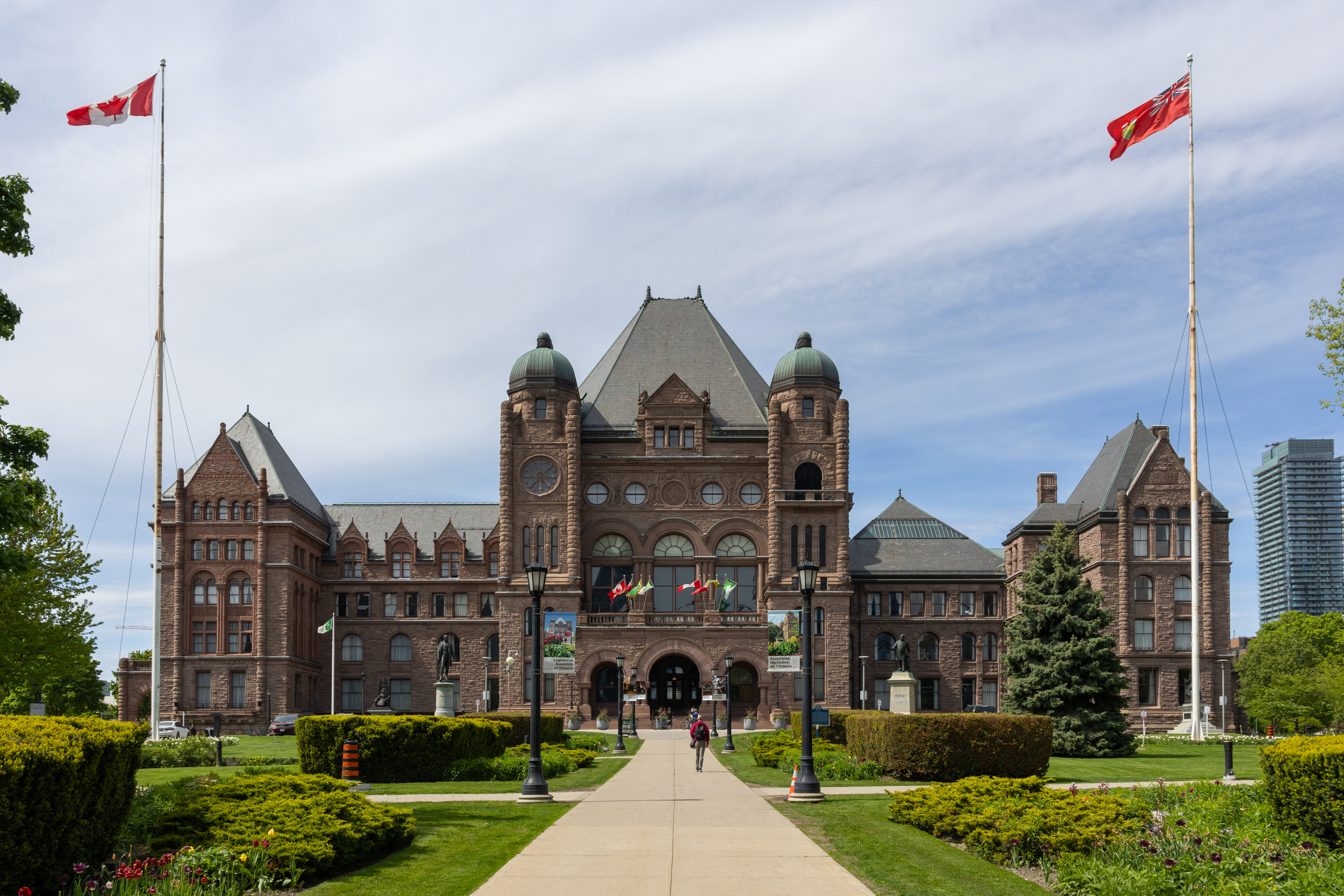
- Ontario Legislative Building

Overview
- Legislative body: Legislative Assembly
- Jurisdiction: Ontario, Canada
- Meeting place: Ontario Legislative Building
- Term: June 2, 2022 – January 28, 2025
- Election: 2022 Election
- Government: Ford ministry (Progressive Conservative)
- Members: 124
- Speaker: Ted Arnott
- Premier: Doug Ford (PC)
- Leader of the Opposition: Peter Tabuns (NDP) (2022–23); Marit Stiles (NDP) (from 2023)
- Party control: 83 / 124(67%)

Sessions
- 1st: August 8, 2022 – January 28, 2025

The 43rd Parliament of Ontario (or the 43rd Ontario Legislature) was the provincial legislature of Ontario that was in office between June 2022 and January 2025. Its composition was initially determined by the Ontario general election held on June 2, 2022. The incumbent governing party from the 42nd Parliament, the Progressive Conservative Party of Ontario led by Premier Doug Ford, claimed eighty-three seats, seven more than the previous election and just over two-third of the 124 seats available, securing a second majority mandate for the Ford ministry to continue in office through the duration of the 43rd Parliament.

In opposition to the government was the Ontario New Democratic Party (NDP) with its ranks reduced by a quarter to thirty-one seats. The Liberals made substantial gain in popular vote, surpassing the NDP, but only gained one seat and thus remain unrecognized. The party leaders of both parties resigned in the early days of the 43rd Parliament.

Despite the large majority mandate, the 43rd parliament lasted only two and a half years. Citing the need for a renewed mandate to steer through economic havoc expected from the re-election of President Donald Trump in the United States, Premier Ford sought and was granted dissolution in January, 2025.

The Speaker of the 43rd Parliament was Ted Arnott, who was also the dean of the legislature as the only members first elected in the 1990 election.

== Party standings ==
Affiliation	Party leader	Status	Seats				
Affiliation	Party leader	Status	2022 elxn	Aug 2022 Conv	June 2023 adj	June 2024 adj	Jan. 2025 diss.
Progressive Conservative	Doug Ford	Government	83	83	81	80	79
New Democratic	Peter Tabuns (interim to Feb. 2023); Marit Stiles (from Feb. 2023)	Official Opposition	31	30	30	28	28
Liberal	John Fraser (parliamentary) (Note: also interim party leader until December 2023) (Note: Fraser was parliamentary leader for the entire duration of the 43rd Parliament as neither Steven Del Duca (party leader until August 2022) nor Bonnie Crombie (party leader from December 2023) were elected member of the 43rd Parliament)	(Not recgonized)	8	8	7	9	9
Green	Mike Schreiner	(Not recgonized)	1	1	1	2	2
Independent (Note: inclusive of members excluded from caucus)			1	1	3	5	6
Total			124	123	122	124	124
Vacant			–	1	2	–	–
Government Majority			42	43	40	36	34

== Parliamentary session ==
The 43rd Parliament sat through its entire lifespan of two-and-a-half years as one single parliamentary session, a new precedent for the Legislative Assembly of Ontario. The practice however was not entirely without precedent. The 42nd Canadian Parliament elected in 2015 sat through its four-year timespan as a single session, as did the 44th Canadian Parliament (elected in September 2021 and dissolved in March 2025) that sat concurrently as the 43rd Ontario Parliament.

While the 43rd Parliament only had one session, it adjourned for extended period at various point. It was convened on August 8, 2022 with the re-election of Speaker Ted Arnott, and sat until September 8 when it was informed of the demise of Her Majesty. It held one sitting on September 13 to pay tribute to the late Queen, and then stood adjourned until October 25, and sat again from October 25 until December 8. In both the years 2023 and 2024, it sat for two periods that would constitute the typical spring and fall sessions in the past.

43rd Ontario Parliament sittings
Session	Year	Convened	Adjourned	Days Sat
1st	2022	Election: June 2		
1st	2022	August 8	September 14	18
1st	2022	October 25	December 8	23
1st	2023	February 21	June 8	47
1st	2023	September 25	December 6	33
1st	2024	February 20	June 6	47
1st	2024	October 21	December 12	28
1st	2025	Dissolution: January 28, for election on February 27		

On January 28, 2025, the 43rd Parliament was dissolved only two-and-a-half year into its term on the advice of the Ford Ministry.

== Presiding officers and party leaders ==
Government	Opposition
Elizabeth II, Queen of Canada (d. September 8, 2022) Charles III, King of Canada (from September 8, 2022) Elizabeth Dowdeswell (until November 14, 2023); Edith Dumont (from November 14, 2023); Lieutenant Governor	
Ted Arnott; Wellington—Halton Hills; Speaker	
Donna Skelly; Flamborough—Glanbrook; Deputy Speaker & Chair, CoW	Bhutila Karpoche; Parkdale—High Park; First Deputy Chair, CoW
Patrice Barnes; Ajax; Second Deputy Chair,CoW	Lucille Collard; Ottawa—Vanier; Third Deputy Chair, CoW
Doug Ford; Etobicoke North; Premier; PC Leader	Marit Stiles; Davenport; Leader of the Opposition; NDP Leader
Sylvia Jones; Dufferin—Caledon; Deputy Premier	Doly Begum; Scarborough Southwest; Deputy Leader, NDP
Paul Calandra; Markham—Stouffville; Government House Leader	Sol Mamakwa; Kiiwetinoong; Deputy Leader, NDP
Ross Romano; Sault Ste. Marie; Chief Government Whip	John Vanthof, Timiskaming—Cochrane; Opposition House Leader (2023-25); Chief Whip (2022-23)
Andrea Khanjin, Barrie—Innisfil; Deputy Government House Leader (2022– 24); Deputy Government Whip (2022–23)	Peggy Sattler; London West; Opposition House Leader (2022-23); Chief Whip (2023-25)
Trevor Jones; Chatham-Kent—Leamington; Deputy Government House Leader (2023–24)	Terence Kernaghan; London North Centre; Deputy Opposition House Leader (2023–25)
Anthony Leardi, Essex; Deputy Government House Leader (2024–25); Deputy Government Whip (2023–24)	Unrecognized parties
Todd McCarthy; Durham; Deputy Government Whip (2022–23)	John Fraser; Ottawa South; Liberal Parliamentary Leader
Natalie Pierre; Burlington; Deputy Government Whip (2024–25)	Lucille Collard; Ottawa—VanierLiberal House Leader
	Mike Schreiner; Guelph; Green Party Leader

== List of members ==
Name	Party	Electoral district	First elected / Previously elected	No. of terms	Note
Patrice Barnes	Progressive Conservative	Ajax	2022	1st term	
Michael Mantha	New Democratic	Algoma—Manitoulin	2011	4th term	
Michael Mantha	Independent (Note: New Democratic until March 31, 2023.)	Algoma—Manitoulin	2011	4th term	
Michael Parsa	Progressive Conservative	Aurora—Oak Ridges—Richmond Hill	2018	2nd term	
Andrea Khanjin	Progressive Conservative	Barrie—Innisfil	2018	2nd term	
Doug Downey	Progressive Conservative	Barrie—Springwater—Oro-Medonte	2018	2nd term	
Todd Smith (until August 16, 2024)	Progressive Conservative	Bay of Quinte	2011	4th term	Resignation: August 16, 2024
Tyler Allsopp (from September 19, 2024)	Progressive Conservative	Bay of Quinte	2024	1st term	By-election: September 19, 2024
Mary-Margaret McMahon	Liberal	Beaches—East York	2022	1st term	
Charmaine Williams	Progressive Conservative	Brampton Centre	2022	1st term	
Hardeep Grewal	Progressive Conservative	Brampton East	2022	1st term	
Graham McGregor	Progressive Conservative	Brampton North	2022	1st term	
Prabmeet Sarkaria	Progressive Conservative	Brampton South	2018	2nd term	
Amarjot Sandhu	Progressive Conservative	Brampton West	2018	2nd term	
Will Bouma	Progressive Conservative	Brantford—Brant	2018	2nd term	
Rick Byers	Progressive Conservative	Bruce—Grey—Owen Sound	2022	1st term	
Natalie Pierre	Progressive Conservative	Burlington	2022	1st term	
Brian Riddell	Progressive Conservative	Cambridge	2022	1st term	
Goldie Ghamari	Progressive Conservative	Carleton	2018	2nd term	
Goldie Ghamari	Independent (Note: Progressive Conservative until June 28, 2024.)	Carleton	2018	2nd term	
Trevor Jones	Progressive Conservative	Chatham-Kent—Leamington	2022	1st term	
Marit Stiles	New Democratic	Davenport	2018	2nd term	
Adil Shamji	Liberal	Don Valley East	2022	1st term	
Vincent Ke	Progressive Conservative	Don Valley North	2018	2nd term	
Vincent Ke	Independent (Note: Progressive Conservative until March 10, 2023.)	Don Valley North	2018	2nd term	
Stephanie Bowman	Liberal	Don Valley West	2022	1st term	
Sylvia Jones	Progressive Conservative	Dufferin—Caledon	2007	5th term	
Todd McCarthy	Progressive Conservative	Durham	2022	1st term	
Robin Martin	Progressive Conservative	Eglinton—Lawrence	2018	2nd term	
Rob Flack	Progressive Conservative	Elgin—Middlesex—London	2022	1st term	
Anthony Leardi	Progressive Conservative	Essex	2022	1st term	
Kinga Surma	Progressive Conservative	Etobicoke Centre	2018	2nd term	
Christine Hogarth	Progressive Conservative	Etobicoke—Lakeshore	2018	2nd term	
Doug Ford	Progressive Conservative	Etobicoke North	2018	2nd term	
Donna Skelly	Progressive Conservative	Flamborough—Glanbrook	2018	2nd term	
Stéphane Sarrazin	Progressive Conservative	Glengarry—Prescott—Russell	2022	1st term	
Mike Schreiner	Green	Guelph	2018	2nd term	
Bobbi Ann Brady	Independent	Haldimand—Norfolk	2022	1st term	
Laurie Scott	Progressive Conservative	Haliburton—Kawartha Lakes—Brock	2003, 2011	6th term*	
Andrea Horwath (until August 15, 2022) (Note: Leader of the New Democratic Party and Leader of the Opposition until June 28, 2022.)	New Democratic	Hamilton Centre	2004	6th term	Resignation: August 15, 2022
Sarah Jama (from March 16, 2023)	New Democratic	Hamilton Centre	2023	1st term	
Sarah Jama (from March 16, 2023)	Independent (Note: New Democratic until October 23, 2023.)	Hamilton Centre	2023	1st term	By-election: March 16, 2023
Neil Lumsden	Progressive Conservative	Hamilton East—Stoney Creek	2022	1st term	
Monique Taylor	New Democratic	Hamilton Mountain	2011	4th term	
Sandy Shaw	New Democratic	Hamilton West—Ancaster—Dundas	2018	2nd term	
Ric Bresee	Progressive Conservative	Hastings—Lennox and Addington	2022	1st term	
Tom Rakocevic	New Democratic	Humber River—Black Creek	2018	2nd term	
Lisa Thompson	Progressive Conservative	Huron—Bruce	2011	4th term	
Merrilee Fullerton (until March 27, 2023)	Progressive Conservative	Kanata—Carleton	2018	2nd term	Resignation: March 27, 2023
Karen McCrimmon (from July 27, 2023)	Liberal	Kanata—Carleton	2023	1st term	By-election: July 27, 2023
Greg Rickford	Progressive Conservative	Kenora—Rainy River	2018	2nd term	
Sol Mamakwa	New Democratic	Kiiwetinoong	2018	2nd term	
Stephen Lecce	Progressive Conservative	King—Vaughan	2018	2nd term	
Ted Hsu	Liberal	Kingston and the Islands	2022	1st term	
Laura Mae Lindo (until July 13, 2023)	New Democratic	Kitchener Centre	2018	2nd term	Resignation: July 13, 2023
Aislinn Clancy (from November 30, 2023)	Green	Kitchener Centre	2023	1st term	Byelection: November 30, 2023
Mike Harris Jr.	Progressive Conservative	Kitchener—Conestoga	2018	2nd term	
Jess Dixon	Progressive Conservative	Kitchener South—Hespeler	2022	1st term	
Monte McNaughton (until October 6, 2023)	Progressive Conservative	Lambton—Kent—Middlesex	2011	4th term	Resignation: October 6, 2023
Steve Pinsonneault (from May 2, 2024)	Progressive Conservative	Lambton—Kent—Middlesex	2024	1st term	Byelection: May 2, 2024
John Jordan	Progressive Conservative	Lanark—Frontenac—Kingston	2022	1st term	
Steve Clark	Progressive Conservative	Leeds—Grenville—Thousand Islands and Rideau Lakes	2010	5th term	
Teresa Armstrong	New Democratic	London—Fanshawe	2011	4th term	
Terence Kernaghan	New Democratic	London North Centre	2018	2nd term	
Peggy Sattler	New Democratic	London West	2013	4th term	
Paul Calandra	Progressive Conservative	Markham—Stouffville	2018	2nd term	
Logan Kanapathi	Progressive Conservative	Markham—Thornhill	2018	2nd term	
Billy Pang	Progressive Conservative	Markham—Unionville	2018	2nd term	
Parm Gill (until January 25, 2024)	Progressive Conservative	Milton	2018	2nd term	Resignation: January 25, 2024
Zee Hamid (from May 2, 2024)	Progressive Conservative	Milton	2024	1st term	Byelection: May 2, 2024
Natalia Kusendova-Bashta	Progressive Conservative	Mississauga Centre	2018	2nd term	
Kaleed Rasheed	Progressive Conservative	Mississauga East—Cooksville	2018	2nd term	
Kaleed Rasheed	Independent (Note: Progressive Conservative until September 20, 2023.)	Mississauga East—Cooksville	2018	2nd term	
Sheref Sabawy	Progressive Conservative	Mississauga—Erin Mills	2018	2nd term	
Rudy Cuzzetto	Progressive Conservative	Mississauga—Lakeshore	2018	2nd term	
Deepak Anand	Progressive Conservative	Mississauga—Malton	2018	2nd term	
Nina Tangri	Progressive Conservative	Mississauga—Streetsville	2018	2nd term	
Guy Bourgouin	New Democratic	Mushkegowuk—James Bay	2018	2nd term	
Lisa MacLeod	Progressive Conservative	Nepean	2006	6th term	
Dawn Gallagher Murphy	Progressive Conservative	Newmarket—Aurora	2022	1st term	
Jeff Burch	New Democratic	Niagara Centre	2018	2nd term	
Wayne Gates	New Democratic	Niagara Falls	2014	4th term	
Sam Oosterhoff	Progressive Conservative	Niagara West	2016	3rd term	
France Gélinas	New Democratic	Nickel Belt	2007	5th term	
Vic Fedeli	Progressive Conservative	Nipissing	2011	4th term	
David Piccini	Progressive Conservative	Northumberland—Peterborough South	2018	2nd term	
Stephen Crawford	Progressive Conservative	Oakville	2018	2nd term	
Effie Triantafilopoulos	Progressive Conservative	Oakville North—Burlington	2018	2nd term	
Stephen Blais	Liberal	Orléans	2020	2nd term	
Jennifer French	New Democratic	Oshawa	2014	3rd term	
Joel Harden	New Democratic	Ottawa Centre	2018	2nd term	
John Fraser	Liberal	Ottawa South	2013	4th term	
Lucille Collard	Liberal	Ottawa—Vanier	2020	2nd term	
Chandra Pasma	New Democratic	Ottawa West—Nepean	2022	1st term	
Ernie Hardeman	Progressive Conservative	Oxford	1995	8th term	
Bhutila Karpoche	New Democratic	Parkdale—High Park	2018	2nd term	
Graydon Smith	Progressive Conservative	Parry Sound—Muskoka	2022	1st term	
Matthew Rae	Progressive Conservative	Perth—Wellington	2022	1st term	
Dave Smith	Progressive Conservative	Peterborough—Kawartha	2018	2nd term	
Peter Bethlenfalvy	Progressive Conservative	Pickering—Uxbridge	2018	2nd term	
John Yakabuski	Progressive Conservative	Renfrew—Nipissing—Pembroke	2003	6th term	
Daisy Wai	Progressive Conservative	Richmond Hill	2018	2nd term	
Jennie Stevens	New Democratic	St. Catharines	2018	2nd term	
Bob Bailey	Progressive Conservative	Sarnia—Lambton	2007	5th term	
Ross Romano	Progressive Conservative	Sault Ste. Marie	2017	3rd term	
Aris Babikian	Progressive Conservative	Scarborough—Agincourt	2018	2nd term	
David Smith	Progressive Conservative	Scarborough Centre	2022	1st term	
Mitzie Hunter (until May 10, 2023)	Liberal	Scarborough—Guildwood	2013	4th term	Resignation: May 10, 2023
Andrea Hazell (from July 27, 2023)	Liberal	Scarborough—Guildwood	2023	1st term	Byelection: July 27, 2023
Raymond Cho	Progressive Conservative	Scarborough North	2016	3rd term	
Vijay Thanigasalam	Progressive Conservative	Scarborough—Rouge Park	2018	2nd term	
Doly Begum	New Democratic	Scarborough Southwest	2018	2nd term	
Brian Saunderson	Progressive Conservative	Simcoe—Grey	2022	1st term	
Jill Dunlop	Progressive Conservative	Simcoe North	2018	2nd term	
Chris Glover	New Democratic	Spadina—Fort York	2018	2nd term	
Nolan Quinn	Progressive Conservative	Stormont—Dundas—South Glengarry	2022	1st term	
Jamie West	New Democratic	Sudbury	2018	2nd term	
Laura Smith	Progressive Conservative	Thornhill	2022	1st term	
Kevin Holland	Progressive Conservative	Thunder Bay—Atikokan	2022	1st term	
Lise Vaugeois	New Democratic	Thunder Bay—Superior North	2022	1st term	
John Vanthof	New Democratic	Timiskaming—Cochrane	2011	4th term	
George Pirie	Progressive Conservative	Timmins	2022	1st term	
Kristyn Wong-Tam	New Democratic	Toronto Centre	2022	1st term	
Peter Tabuns (Note: Interim Leader of the New Democratic Party and Leader of the Opposition from June 28, 2022 to February 4, 2023.)	New Democratic	Toronto—Danforth	2006	6th term	
Jill Andrew	New Democratic	Toronto—St. Paul's	2018	2nd term	
Jessica Bell	New Democratic	University—Rosedale	2018	2nd term	
Michael Tibollo	Progressive Conservative	Vaughan—Woodbridge	2018	2nd term	
Catherine Fife	New Democratic	Waterloo	2012	4th term	
Ted Arnott	Progressive Conservative	Wellington—Halton Hills	1990	9th term	
Lorne Coe	Progressive Conservative	Whitby	2016	3rd term	
Stan Cho	Progressive Conservative	Willowdale	2018	2nd term	
Andrew Dowie	Progressive Conservative	Windsor—Tecumseh	2022	1st term	
Lisa Gretzky	New Democratic	Windsor West	2014	3rd term	
Michael Kerzner	Progressive Conservative	York Centre	2022	1st term	
Caroline Mulroney	Progressive Conservative	York—Simcoe	2018	2nd term	
Michael Ford	Progressive Conservative	York South—Weston	2022	1st term	

== Timeline ==
=== Changes in MPPs ===
seat changed hand after by-election
involuntary departure

Progressive Conservative
Liberal Green

New Democratic
Independent

43rd Ontario Parliament (2022–25) - Membership and party affiliation changes
Electoral District	Before			Change	
Electoral District	Date	Reason	Member exited	New member	Date
Hamilton Centre	August 15, 2022	Resignation (Note: to contest Mayoralty of Hamilton)	Andrea Horwath	Sarah Jama	March 16, 2023
Don Valley North	March 10, 2023	Left caucus (Note: over allegations of involvement with Chinese government election interference)	Vincent Ke		(Note: sought re-election as an independent)
Kanata—Carleton	March 27, 2023	Resignation (Note: following public outcry over handling of long-term care home during COVID pandemic)	Merrilee Fullerton	Karen McCrimmon	July 27, 2023
Algoma—Manitoulin	March 31, 2023	Removal from caucus (Note: over to allegations involving workplace misconduct)	Michael Mantha		
Scarborough—Guildwood	May 10, 2023	Resignation (Note: to contest the 2023 Toronto mayoral by-election)	Mitzie Hunter	Andrea Hazell	July 27, 2023
Kitchener Centre	July 13, 2023	Resignation (Note: to accept a teaching position at the University of Waterloo)	Laura Mae Lindo	Aislinn Clancy	Nov 30, 2023
Mississauga East—Cooksville	Sep 20, 2023	Left caucus/cabinet (Note: due to contradictory claims regarding a Las Vegas business trip)	Kaleed Rasheed		
Lambton—Kent—Middlesex	Oct 6, 2023	Resignation (Note: to return to private sector)	Monte McNaughton	Steve Pinsonneault	May 2, 2024
Hamilton Centre	October 23, 2023	Removal from caucus (Note: over controversial statements made regarding the Gaza war)	Sarah Jama		
Milton	January 25, 2024	Resignation (Note: to contest subsequent federal election)	Parm Gill	Zee Hamid	May 2, 2024
Carleton	June 28, 2024	Removal from caucus (Note: for meeting with far-right activist Tommy Robinson)	Goldie Ghamari		
Bay of Quinte	August 16, 2024	Resignation	Todd Smith	Tyler Allsopp	Sep 19, 2024

=== Membership changes ===
Party	2022		2023											2024				
Party	Jun	Aug	March				May	July		Sep	Oct		Nov	Jan	May	Jun	Aug	Sep
Party	02	15	10	16	24	31	10	13	27	20	06	23	30	25	02	28	16	19
Progressive Conservative	83		82		81					80	79			78	80	79	78	79
New Democratic	31	30		31		30		29				28						
Liberal	8						7		9									
Green	1												2					
Independent	1		2			3				4		5				6		
Total members	124	123		124	123		122	121	123		122		123	122	124		123	124
Vacant	0	1		0	1		2	3	1		2		1	2	0		1	0
