= Leona Dombrowsky =

Canadian politician

The Honourable Leona Dombrowsky ECO

Ontario MPP
- In office 2007–2011
- Preceded by: Ernie Parsons
- Succeeded by: Todd Smith
- Constituency: Prince Edward—Hastings
- In office 1999–2007
- Preceded by: Harry Danford
- Succeeded by: Riding abolished
- Constituency: Hastings—Frontenac—Lennox and Addington

Personal details
- Born: April 29, 1957 (age 69) Belleville, Ontario, Canada
- Party: Liberal

Leona Dombrowsky (born April 29, 1957) is a former Canadian politician in Ontario, Canada. She was a Liberal member of the Legislative Assembly of Ontario from 1999 to 2011 who represented the ridings of Hastings—Frontenac—Lennox and Addington and Prince Edward—Hastings. She served as a cabinet minister in the government of Premier Dalton McGuinty.

== Background ==
Dombrowsky was born in Belleville, Ontario and received a Bachelor of Arts degree from the University of Toronto in 1979. She was elected as a Catholic School trustee on the Hastings-Prince Edward Separate School Board in 1985, and served as its Chair from 1991 to 1996. In 1998, she was elected to the amalgamated Algonquin-Lakeshore Catholic District School Board. She was also a Director of the Ontario Catholic Trustees Association during this period, and served on the Tweed Parks & Recreation Committee from 1991 to 1997. As of 2012, she served as a justice of the peace.

== Politics ==
Dombrowsky was elected to the Ontario legislature in the provincial election of 1999, as a Liberal in the rural riding of Hastings—Frontenac—Lennox and Addington (which surrounds the city of Kingston, Ontario) defeating incumbent Progressive Conservative Harry Danford by about 2,000 votes. The election was won by the Progressive Conservatives; despite her lack of experience, Dombrowsky soon emerged as a prominent voice in the opposition benches, serving as Official Opposition Critic for Community, Family and Children's Services and Deputy House Leader.

The Liberals won the provincial election of 2003, and Dombrowsky was re-elected by about 8,000 votes over her Progressive Conservative opponent. On October 23, 2003, she was appointed Minister of the Environment. In this capacity, she was responsible for overseeing changes to the province's water supply system (the safety of which was called into question after a tragic outbreak of e-coli in Walkerton, Ontario). Dombrowsky's ministry hired more full-time water inspectors and also called for the phasing out of coal-fired electrical generating plants.

On June 29, 2005 Dombrowsky became Minister of Agriculture, Food and Rural Affairs. On January 18, 2010, Dombrowsky was named Minister of Education.

In the 2011 election, she lost her seat to Progressive Conservative Todd Smith.

=== Cabinet positions ===
McGuinty ministry, Province of Ontario (2003–2013)
Cabinet posts (3)
Predecessor	Office	Successor
Kathleen Wynne	Minister of Education; 2010–2011	Laurel Broten
Steve Peters	Minister of Agriculture, Food and Rural Affairs; 2005–2010	Carol Mitchell
Jim Wilson	Minister of the Environment; 2003–2005	Laurel Broten

== Electoral record ==
2011 Ontario general election: Prince Edward—Hastings
Party	Candidate	Votes	%	±%
Progressive Conservative	Todd Smith	18,816	42.28	+9.46
Liberal	Leona Dombrowsky	15,686	35.25	-11.11
New Democratic	Sherry Hayes	7,379	16.58	+2.68
Green	Treat Hull	2,049	4.60	-1.29
Family Coalition	Neal Ford	257	0.58	-0.08
Libertarian	Andrew Skinner	201	0.45	
Republican	Trueman Tuck	115	0.26	-0.11
Total valid votes		44,503	99.66	
Total rejected, unmarked and declined ballots		152	0.34	-0.23
Turnout		44,655	51.74	-2.42
Eligible voters		86,304		
Progressive Conservative gain from Liberal		Swing		+10.29
Source: Elections Ontario

2007 Ontario general election: Prince Edward—Hastings
Party	Candidate	Votes	%	±%
Liberal	Leona Dombrowsky	20,963	46.36	-8.80
Progressive Conservative	Eric DenOuden	14,840	32.82	+1.79
New Democratic	Jodie Jenkins	6,287	13.90	+3.55
Green	Jim Arkilander	2,663	5.89	
Family Coalition	Vito Luceno	297	0.66	
Republican	Trueman Tuck	166	0.37	
Total valid votes		45,216	99.43	
Total rejected ballots		259	0.57	
Turnout		45,475	54.16	
Eligible voters		83,963		
Liberal hold		Swing		-5.30
Note: Change in percentage of vote calculated on results redistributed from predecessor ridings.

2003 Ontario general election
Party	Candidate	Votes	%	±%
Liberal	Leona Dombrowsky	21,548	51.89	+5.15
Progressive Conservative	Barry F. Gordon	13,709	33.01	-9.51
New Democratic	Ross Sutherland	4,286	10.32	+3.43
Green	Adam Scott	1,311	3.16	+1.84
Family Coalition	John-Henry Westen	673	1.62	+0.42

1999 Ontario general election
Party	Candidate	Votes	%	±%
Liberal	Leona Dombrowsky	20,395	46.74	
Progressive Conservative	Harry Danford	18,553	42.52	
New Democratic	Allan Mcphail	3,008	6.89	
Green	Cathy Vakil	576	1.32	
Family Coalition	John-henry Westen	524	1.2	
Natural Law	Peter Leggat	382	0.88	
Independent	Karl Walker	200	0.46	
