= Ontario Teacher Candidates' Council v. Ontario (Education) =

Ontario Teacher Candidates’ Council v. Ontario (Education), 2023 ONCA 788 is a Canadian constitutional law decision concerning s. 15(1) of the Canadian Charter of Rights and Freedoms, being Part I of the Constitution Act, 1982. It concerned the constitutionality of Ontario's requirement that teachers pass a proficiency test in mathematics.

== Background ==
In 2021, the government of Ontario introduced a requirement that all new teachers in the province have to pass a mathematics proficiency test by scoring at least 70%. The test included 75 multiple choice questions based on elementary and secondary school mathematics. The Ontario Teacher Candidates’ Council alleged the test requirement was unconstitutional because the test disproportionately impacted ethnic minority teachers.

== Divisional Court ==
Backhouse and Nishikawa JJ. (Tzimas J. with them) found that the test requirement was unconstitutional because it disfavoured ethnic minority teachers. The Court held that "Racialized students benefit from being taught by racialized teachers" and that "the deleterious effects of the MPT on racialized teacher candidates who have been unsuccessful in the test outweighs its benefits."

== Court of Appeal ==
In the Court of Appeal, Doherty, Nordheimer and Monahan JJ.A. held that the test requirement was not unconstitutional.

== Reactions ==
The Ontario Teacher Candidates’ Council expressed its disappointment at the decision, while education minister Stephen Lecce welcomed it.

After the Divisional Court decision, some commentators suggested that the Ontario government should invoke the notwithstanding clause.
