= Paul Johnson (Canadian politician) =

Canadian politician (born 1952)

Ontario MPP
- In office 1990–1995
- Preceded by: New riding
- Succeeded by: Gary Fox
- Constituency: Prince Edward—Lennox—South Hastings

Personal details
- Born: January 3, 1952 (age 74) Toronto, Ontario
- Party: New Democrat
- Occupation: Lawyer

Paul R. Johnson (born January 3, 1952) is a former politician in Ontario, Canada. He was a New Democratic Party member of the Legislative Assembly of Ontario from 1990 to 1995.

== Background ==
Johnson was educated at Loyalist College and the Labour College of Canada, receiving an Instructor's Certificate from the latter institution. He served as president of the Ontario Public Service Employees Union Local 448 from 1986 to 1989, and was first vice-president of the Quinte Labour Council in 1988-89. He also co-chaired the Quinte Environmental Resources Alliance, and was president of the Big Brothers/Big Sisters of Prince Edward, Ontario.

== Politics ==
Johnson ran for the Ontario legislature in the 1987 provincial election, finishing third in Prince Edward—Lennox against Liberal Keith MacDonald. The following year, in the 1988 federal election, he served as campaign manager for local New Democratic Party candidate Don Wilson. He was also elected president of the federal NDP riding association in Prince Edward—Hastings, and was elected to the Athol Township municipal council in November 1988.

The NDP won a majority government in the 1990 provincial election, and Johnson was elected over Progressive Conservative candidate Don Bonter by about 1,000 votes in the renamed riding of Prince Edward—Lennox—South Hastings (MacDonald finished third). Johnson served as parliamentary assistant to a variety of cabinet ministers in the parliament which followed.

The NDP were defeated in the 1995 provincial election, and Johnson finished third against Progressive Conservative candidate Gary Fox in his bid for re-election. He was later elected as a councillor in Prince Edward County, and served until an unsuccessful bid for mayor of the county in 2003.

Johnson remains active in the NDP, and helped with the party's Prince Edward—Hastings campaign in the 2004 federal election.
