= 2024 Bay of Quinte provincial by-election =

Provincial by-election in Ontario, Canada

- September 19, 2024

Riding of Bay of Quinte
- Turnout: 38.45% (▼7.46)
	First party	Second party	Third party
	PC	LIB	NDP
Candidate	Tyler Allsopp	Sean Kelly	Amanda Robertson
Party	Progressive Conservative	Liberal	New Democratic
Last election	49.30%	18.45%	20.92%
Popular vote	14,430	12,428	8,607
Percentage	38.69%	33.32%	23.08%
Swing	▼10.61 pp	▲14.87 pp	▲2.16 pp
MPP before election
Todd Smith
PC
Elected MPP
Tyler Allsopp
PC

A by-election was held in the provincial riding of Bay of Quinte on September 19, 2024, to elect a new member of the Legislative Assembly of Ontario following the resignation of Progressive Conservative MPP and cabinet minister Todd Smith for a new job in the private sector. It resulted in the victory of PC candidate Tyler Allsopp, though by a reduced margin compared to his predecessor.

== Opinion polls ==
Polling Firm	Last Date of Polling	Link	PC	OLP	ONDP	Green	Other	Margin of Error	Sample Size	Polling Method
By-election 2024	September 19, 2024		38.69	33.32	23.08	3.17	1.74			
Liaison Strategies	September 9, 2024		35	36	18	5	6	±4.21 pp	541	IVR
Election 2022	June 2, 2022		49.30	18.45	20.92	6.27	5.06			

== Results ==
Ontario provincial by-election, September 19, 2024: Bay of Quinte Resignation of Todd Smith
Party	Candidate	Votes	%	±%	Expenditures
Progressive Conservative	Tyler Allsopp	14,430	38.69	–10.61	$140,699
Liberal	Sean Kelly	12,428	33.32	+14.87	$105,603
New Democratic	Amanda Robertson	8,606	23.07	+2.15	$106,045
Green	Lori Borthwick	1,186	3.18	–3.09	$15,616
New Blue	Margaret Schuler	369	0.99	–1.61	$0
Independent	John Turmel	149	0.40	–	$0
Libertarian	Mark Snow	129	0.35	–	$0
Total valid votes/expense limit		37,297	99.49	–	$156,936
Total rejected, unmarked and declined ballots		190	0.51	+0.10	
Turnout		37,487	38.02	–7.89	
Eligible voters		98,590			
Progressive Conservative hold		Swing		–12.74	
Source: Elections Ontario

== See also ==
- List of Ontario by-elections
