= Thomas Gilmore Bowerman =

Canadian politician from Ontario

Member of the Ontario Provincial Parliament for Prince Edward—Lennox
- In office June 19, 1934 – August 25, 1937
- Preceded by: constituency established
- Succeeded by: James de Congalton Hepburn

Personal details
- Party: Liberal

Thomas Gilmore Bowerman was a Canadian politician who was Liberal MPP for Prince Edward—Lennox from 1934 to 1937.

== See also ==
- 19th Parliament of Ontario
