= Ernie Parsons =

Canadian politician

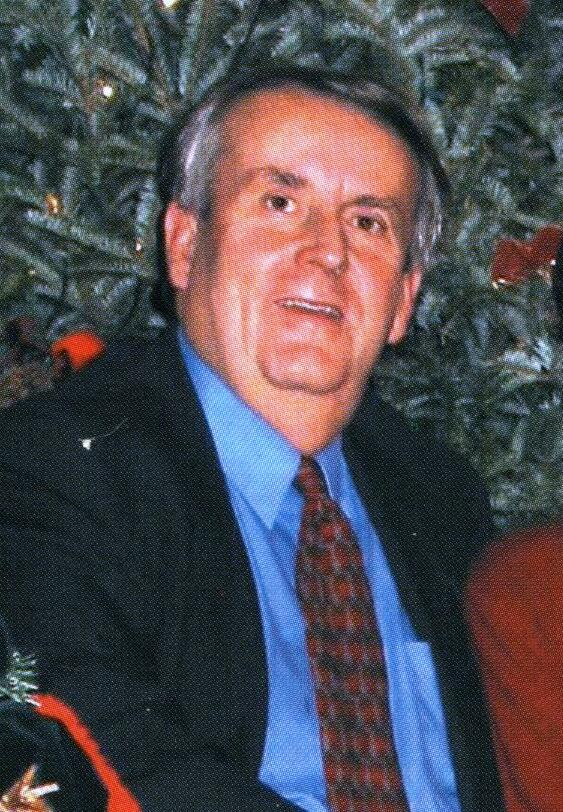
- Parsons, 2003

Ontario MPP
- In office 1999–2007
- Preceded by: New riding
- Succeeded by: Leona Dombrowsky
- Constituency: Prince Edward—Hastings

Personal details
- Born: June 5, 1946 (age 79) Belleville, Ontario, Canada
- Party: Liberal
- Spouse: Linda
- Occupation: Civil engineer

Ernie Parsons (born June 5, 1946) is a former politician in Ontario, Canada. He was a member of the Legislative Assembly of Ontario, representing the riding of Prince Edward—Hastings for the Ontario Liberal Party from 1999 to 2007. In 2007 he was appointed as a Justice of the Peace.

== Background ==
Parsons received a Civil Engineering degree from Carleton University in 1969, and was employed by the Ministry of Transportation from 1969 to 1974, and taught Technology courses at Loyalist College from 1974 to 1999. He also worked as a farmer, and was a board member of the Hastings County Children's Aid Society for twenty-five years and its chair for three. Parsons was a founding member of the Hastings County Museum of Agricultural Heritage, and sat on advisory committees to the Kingston Hotel Dieu, the Kingston General Hospital and the Queen's University Faculty of Medicine. Parsons served on the school board of the Hastings—Prince Edward district from 1982 to 1999.

== Politics ==
In the 1999 provincial election he defeated Progressive Conservative incumbent Gary Fox by 56 votes in Prince Edward—Hastings. The Progressive Conservatives won the election, and Parsons spent the next four years in opposition.

The Liberals won the 2003 provincial election, and Parsons was re-elected in Prince Edward—Hastings by over 10,000 votes over Tory John Williams. He was named parliamentary assistant to Ontario Minister of Transportation Harinder Takhar on October 23, 2003, and parliamentary assistant to Sandra Pupatello, the Ontario Minister of Community and Social Services on September 27, 2004. He shared the latter position with Deb Matthews.

Following the death of his adopted son, Sandy, in 2004, Parsons introduced a Private Members Bill, that became known as Sandy's Law. The law requires establishments to display a sign warning of the dangers of consuming alcohol while pregnant.

Although Private member's bills rarely pass into law, Sandy's law received unanimous support and was passed into law later in the year.

On June 30, 2007, Parsons was appointed a Justice of the Peace effective July 12. The appointment has garnered accusations of patronage from the opposition parties. As the appointment occurred within six months of the 2007 provincial election, scheduled for October, there was no by-election to fill the vacancy. Parsons had already announced in late 2006 that he would not run in the 2007 election.
