= King—Vaughan (provincial electoral district) =

Provincial electoral district in Ontario, Canada

Coordinates: 43.867°N 79.570°W

Ontario electoral district
- King—Vaughan in relation to other Greater Toronto Area districts

Provincial electoral district
- Legislature: Legislative Assembly of Ontario
MPP
Stephen Lecce
Progressive Conservative
- District created: 2015
- First contested: 2018
- Last contested: 2025

Demographics
- Population (2021): 147,695
- Electors (2025): 111,214
- Area (km²): 430
- Pop. density (per km²): 343.5
- Census division: York
- Census subdivision(s): King, Vaughan

King—Vaughan is a provincial electoral district in Ontario, Canada. It elects one member to the Legislative Assembly of Ontario. This riding was created in 2015.

== Members of Provincial Parliament ==
King—Vaughan
Assembly	Years	Member	Party
Riding created from Oak Ridges—Markham and Vaughan
42nd	2018–2022	Stephen Lecce	Progressive Conservative
43rd	2022–2025	Stephen Lecce	Progressive Conservative
44th	2025–present	Stephen Lecce	Progressive Conservative

== Election results ==
Winning party in each polling division of King—Vaughan at the 2025 Ontario general election

2025 Ontario general election
Party	Candidate	Votes	%	±%
Progressive Conservative	Stephen Lecce	28,527	64.17	+6.86
Liberal	Gillian Vivona	12,453	28.01	–0.49
New Democratic	Rick Morelli	1,714	3.86	–3.09
Green	Ann Raney	934	2.10	–0.60
New Blue	Christopher Bressi	569	1.28	–2.14
Ontario Party	Maria Morgis	256	0.58	–0.18
Total valid votes		44,453	99.39	
Total rejected, unmarked and declined ballots		274	0.61	+0.06
Turnout		44,727	39.89	+0.09
Eligible voters		112,129		
Progressive Conservative hold		Swing		▲3.68
Source: Elections Ontario

Winning party in each polling division of King—Vaughan at the 2022 Ontario general election

2022 Ontario general election
Party	Candidate	Votes	%	±%
Progressive Conservative	Stephen Lecce	23,439	57.31	+0.69
Liberal	Gillian Vivona	11,658	28.51	+5.16
New Democratic	Samantha Sanchez	2,840	6.94	–8.45
New Blue	Michael Di Mascolo	1,400	3.42	–
Green	Ren Guidolin	1,104	2.70	–0.71
Ontario Party	Neil Killips	309	0.76	–
Moderate	Tatiana Babitch	147	0.36	+0.07
Total valid votes		40,897	99.45	
Total rejected, unmarked and declined ballots		228	0.55	–0.32
Turnout		41,125	39.79	–15.73
Eligible voters		103,344		
Progressive Conservative hold		Swing		▼2.23
Source: Elections Ontario

2018 Ontario general election
Party	Candidate	Votes	%
Progressive Conservative	Stephen Lecce	29,136	56.62
Liberal	Marilyn Iafrate	12,012	23.34
New Democratic	Andrea Beal	7,921	15.39
Green	Greg Locke	1,754	3.41
Trillium	Roman Evtukh	252	0.49
Libertarian	Yan Simkin	235	0.46
Moderate	Tatiana Babitch	151	0.29
Total valid votes		51,461	99.13
Total rejected, unmarked and declined ballots		454	0.87
Turnout		51,915	55.52
Eligible voters		93,503	
Progressive Conservative pickup new district.			
Source: Elections Ontario

2014 general election redistributed results
Party	Vote	%
Liberal	17,618	51.31
Progressive Conservative	11,084	32.28
New Democratic	3,986	11.61
Green	1,022	2.98
Others	627	1.83

== See also ==
- List of Ontario provincial electoral districts
- Canadian provincial electoral districts
