= Stephen Lecce =

Canadian politician (born 1986)

The Honourable Stephen Lecce ECO MPP
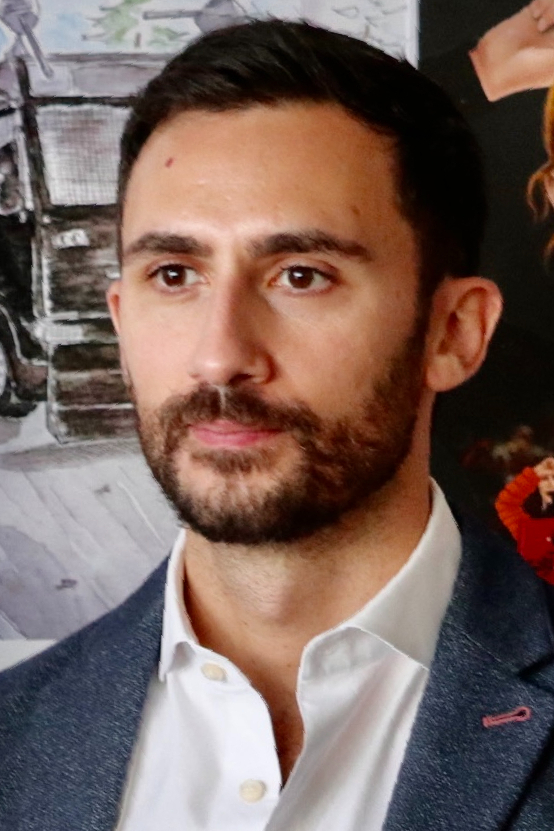
- Lecce in 2022

Minister of Energy and Mines
- Incumbent
- Assumed office June 6, 2024
- Premier: Doug Ford
- Preceded by: Todd Smith

Minister of Education
- In office June 20, 2019 – June 6, 2024
- Premier: Doug Ford
- Preceded by: Lisa Thompson
- Succeeded by: Todd Smith

Parliamentary Assistant to the Minister of Infrastructure
- In office June 29, 2018 – June 20, 2019
- Premier: Doug Ford
- Succeeded by: Stephen Crawford

Deputy Government House Leader
- In office July 23, 2018 – June 20, 2019
- Premier: Doug Ford
- Succeeded by: Amy Fee

Parliamentary Assistant to the Premier
- In office July 31, 2018 – June 20, 2019
- Premier: Doug Ford
- Succeeded by: Will Bouma

Member of the Ontario Provincial Parliament for King—Vaughan
- Incumbent
- Assumed office June 7, 2018
- Preceded by: Riding established

Personal details
- Born: Stephen Francis Lecce; November 26, 1986 (age 39) Vaughan, Ontario, Canada
- Party: Progressive Conservative
- Education: University of Western Ontario
- Occupation: Politician; consultant
- Website: Campaign website Constituency website

Stephen Francis Lecce (Italian: [ˈlettʃe]; born November 26, 1986) is a Canadian politician and Ontario's minister of Energy and Mines. Lecce was the Ontario Minister of Education from 2019 to 2024. A member of the Progressive Conservative (PC) Party, Lecce is the member of Provincial Parliament (MPP) for King—Vaughan, representing the riding in the Legislative Assembly of Ontario since his election in 2018. Before running for office, Lecce worked in the Prime Minister's Office (PMO) as the director of media relations during Stephen Harper's tenure.

== Early life ==
Lecce was born in Vaughan, Ontario, the son of Italian immigrants who came to Canada in the late 1950s. At age 13, he worked for then-PC MPP Al Palladini's successful re-election campaign in 1999.

== Education and early career ==
Lecce attended St. Margaret Mary Catholic Elementary School in Woodbridge, St. Michael's College School in Toronto, and later the University of Western Ontario (UWO), completing a Bachelor of Arts in political science. There, he was elected and served as president of UWO's University Students' Council. While studying at UWO, he was initiated into the Sigma Chi fraternity, eventually serving as the UWO chapter's president.

After graduation, Lecce joined the Prime Minister's Office (PMO) under Stephen Harper. Lecce was hired following a personal interaction with Harper in his capacity as president of UWO's Students' Council. At the PMO, Lecce served as deputy director of communications before being promoted to director of media relations.

Lecce owns a public relations consultancy firm.

== Political career ==
Lecce ran as a Progressive Conservative in King—Vaughan and won with 29,136 votes (56.62%). On June 29, 2018, Lecce became the parliamentary assistant to Monte McNaughton, the minister of infrastructure. On July 31, Lecce became parliamentary assistant to the premier.

=== Minister of Education ===
On June 20, 2019, he was sworn in as Ontario's minister of education. Beginning in October 2019, labour disputes between the provincial government and Ontario's four largest teachers' unions (ETFO, OSSTF, OECTA, and AEFO), have caused rotating strike action. A joint strike by all four unions on February 21, 2020, marked the first province-wide closure of schools since 1997 strikes against the Harris government. Earlier that month, on February 4, New Democratic Party leader Andrea Horwath called for Doug Ford to fire Lecce as education minister; however, Ford assured that Lecce would remain in office. On February 12, Lecce called the decision for the four largest teachers' unions to hold the joint strike an "irresponsible choice".

On March 12, 2020, Lecce announced that all publicly funded schools in Ontario would be closed for two weeks after March break due to the COVID-19 pandemic in Ontario, however, the schools did not reopen as planned. On May 19, Lecce announced that schools would not reopen until the following school year in September. On July 30, Lecce announced a $309 million plan for the resumption of public education in September.

Lecce introduced Bill 28, known as the Keeping Students in Class Act, which was passed by the Legislative Assembly of Ontario on November 3, 2022, amid ongoing labour negotiations with the Canadian Union of Public Employees (CUPE). CUPE had given notice of job action on October 30 after negotiations broke down with the Ministry of Education and would have been in a legal strike position on November 4. Bill 28 imposes a contract on CUPE, and makes it illegal to strike, setting fines of $4,000 for workers.

The bill invokes the notwithstanding clause, shielding it from being struck down by the courts by allowing the bill to operate despite the right to collective bargaining granted by the Canadian Charter of Rights and Freedoms. The legislation was widely condemned, including by opposition parties, the Canadian Civil Liberties Association, Prime Minister Justin Trudeau, Minister of Justice and Attorney General of Canada David Lametti, the Ontario Bar Association, and other unions including those which had previously endorsed the PC Party.

Despite Lecce's bill, CUPE went on strike anyway, resulting in province-wide protests in support of education workers against the government, and the government challenging CUPE at the Ontario Labour Relations Board. On November 7, 2022, Premier Doug Ford announced that the PCs would rescind Bill 28. It was announced that a tentative deal with CUPE was reached on December 11, 2022.

=== Minister of Energy and Electrification ===
On June 6, 2024, Lecce was appointed Minister of Energy and Electrification by Premier Doug Ford. Lecce was Ontario's longest-serving Minister of Education since Bette Stephenson.

Lecce completed trade missions to Romania, the UK, the U.S., Estonia, and Poland, securing $400 million in agreements to export nuclear technology, creating jobs and strengthening Ontario’s global energy partnerships. Lecce also hosted over 60 U.S. Congressional and State leaders to promote Ontario’s energy export strategy and deepen cross-border collaboration.

In August 2024, he launched Canada’s largest competitive energy procurement in history only to increase the procurement by 50% some months later.

In October 2024, Lecce introduced the Affordable Energy Act, which established Ontario’s first long-term Integrated Energy Plan to secure power for the next 25 years, following the Independent Electricity System Operator releasing a revised demand forecast that saw Ontario's energy demand increase by 75 per cent.

Stephen announced a plan to develop up to 10,000 megawatts of new nuclear energy at Wesleyville in Port Hope that will see over 10,500 jobs created. The project—New Nuclear at Wesleyville— will contribute $235 billion to Ontario’s GDP over 95 years.

During his tenure, the Ontario government also announced the Home Renovation Savings Program as part of Canada’s largest energy efficiency initiative, a $10.9 billion investment over 12 years as well as plans to refurbish the Pickering Nuclear Generating Station, extending its operational life to ensure a stable supply of clean energy for decades to come. Separately, Lecce publicized the refurbishment of Unit 1 at Darlington was completed 140 days ahead of schedule, highlighting the efficiency and expertise of Ontario’s energy workforce.

=== Minister of Energy and Mines ===
On March 19, 2025, Lecce was sworn into 44th Parliament of Ontario and was reappointed to cabinet with new responsibilities as Ontario's Minister of Energy and Mines.

== Advocacy ==
In November 2026, Lecce signed a released statement condemning antisemitism with other Italian Canadian business and community leaders, including Steven Del Duca, Mayor of Vaughan, Frank Scarpitti, Mayor of Markham, and Steve Pellegrini, Mayor of King, referencing the Christie Pits riot of 1933.

== Electoral record ==
2025 Ontario general election
Party	Candidate	Votes	%	±%
Progressive Conservative	Stephen Lecce	28,527	64.17	+6.86
Liberal	Gillian Vivona	12,453	28.01	–0.50
New Democratic	Rick Morelli	1,714	3.86	–3.08
Green	Ann Raney	934	2.10	–0.60
New Blue	Christopher Bressi	569	1.28	–2.14
Ontario Party	Maria Morgis	256	0.58	–0.18
Total valid votes		44,453	99.39	–0.06
Total rejected, unmarked and declined ballots		274	0.61	+0.06
Turnout		44,727	40.22	+0.43
Eligible voters		111,214		
Progressive Conservative hold		Swing		+3.68
Source: Elections Ontario

2022 Ontario general election: King—Vaughan
Party	Candidate	Votes	%	±%
Progressive Conservative	Stephen Lecce	23,439	57.31	+0.69
Liberal	Gillian Vivona	11,658	28.51	+5.16
New Democratic	Samantha Sanchez	2,840	6.94	–8.45
New Blue	Michael Di Mascolo	1,400	3.42	–
Green	Ren Guidolin	1,104	2.70	–0.71
Ontario Party	Neil Killips	309	0.76	–
Moderate	Tatiana Babitch	147	0.36	+0.07
Total valid votes		40,897	99.45	
Total rejected, unmarked and declined ballots		228	0.55	–0.32
Turnout		41,125	39.79	–15.73
Eligible voters		103,344		
Progressive Conservative hold		Swing		▼2.23
Source: Elections Ontario

2018 Ontario general election
Party	Candidate	Votes	%	±%
Progressive Conservative	Stephen Lecce	29,136	56.62	+24.34
Liberal	Marilyn Iafrate	12,012	23.34	-27.97
New Democratic	Andrea Beal	7,921	15.39	+3.70
Green	Greg Locke	1,754	3.41	+0.43
Trillium	Roman Evtukh	252	0.49	
Libertarian	Yan Simkin	235	0.46	
Moderate	Tatiana Babitch	151	0.29	
Total valid votes			100.0	
Source: Elections Ontario

Ford ministry, Province of Ontario (2018–present)
Cabinet post (1)
Predecessor	Office	Successor
Lisa Thompson	Minister of Education; June 20, 2019 - June 6, 2024	Todd Smith
