= Gary Fox =

Canadian politician (1943–2022)

Ontario MPP
- In office 1995–1999
- Preceded by: Paul Johnson
- Succeeded by: Riding abolished
- Constituency: Prince Edward—Lennox—South Hastings

Personal details
- Born: December 23, 1943 Picton, Ontario, Canada
- Died: December 8, 2022 (aged 78)
- Party: Progressive Conservative
- Occupation: Sheep Farmer

Gary John Fox (December 23, 1943 – December 8, 2022) was a Canadian politician in Ontario. He was a Progressive Conservative member of the Legislative Assembly of Ontario from 1995 to 1999.

== Background ==
Fox was educated at the University of Guelph, and graduated from their Advanced Agriculture Leadership Program. He worked as a farmer after graduation, and became a senior partner in Fox Farms of Bloomfield, Ontario.

== Politics ==
Fox served as a councillor on the Sophiasburgh township council and the Prince Edward County Regional Council, and was a reeve of Sophiasburgh.

He was elected to the Ontario legislature in the 1995 provincial election, defeating Liberal candidate Robert Gentile and incumbent New Democrat Paul Johnson by over 6,000 votes in the riding of Prince Edward—Lennox-South Hastings. He served as a backbench supporter of Mike Harris's government for the next four years, and was chair of the PC Rural Caucus Advisory Committee.

Fox was upset by Liberal Ernie Parsons in the 1999 provincial election, losing by only 56 votes in the redistributed riding of Prince Edward—Hastings. He sought the federal Conservative Party of Canada nomination in Prince Edward—Hastings for the 2004 federal election, but lost to Daryl Kramp.

== Later life and death ==
Fox thereafter continued to be a leading farmer in Prince Edward County, where he was considered to be a skilled sheepbreeder, and an expert evaluator of sale cattle.

Fox died on December 8, 2022, at the age of 79.
