= James de Congalton Hepburn =

Canadian politician (1878–1955)

James Hepburn

Ontario MPP
- In office 1937–1948
- Preceded by: Thomas Gilmore Bowerman
- Succeeded by: John Donald Baxter
- Constituency: Prince Edward—Lennox

Personal details
- Born: April 23, 1878 Picton, Ontario
- Died: December 24, 1955 (aged 77) Picton, Ontario
- Party: Progressive Conservative
- Occupation: Businessman

James de Congalton Hepburn (April 23, 1878 – December 24, 1955) was a politician in Ontario, Canada. He represented Prince Edward—Lennox in the Legislative Assembly of Ontario from 1937 to 1948 as a Conservative (1937–1943) and Progressive Conservative (1943–1948).

He was born in Picton, Ontario, the son of Arthur W. Hepburn who operated a fleet of steamships. Hepburn was educated at Trinity College School in Port Hope and entered his father's business after completing his schooling. He also served three years as reeve of Picton.

Hepburn became speaker following the resignation of William James Stewart. He served as speaker of the Legislature of Ontario from March 24, 1947, to April 16, 1948. He was defeated when he ran for reelection in 1948.

He died at home in Picton at the age of 77.
