= James A. Taylor =

Canadian lawyer and politician (1928–2020)

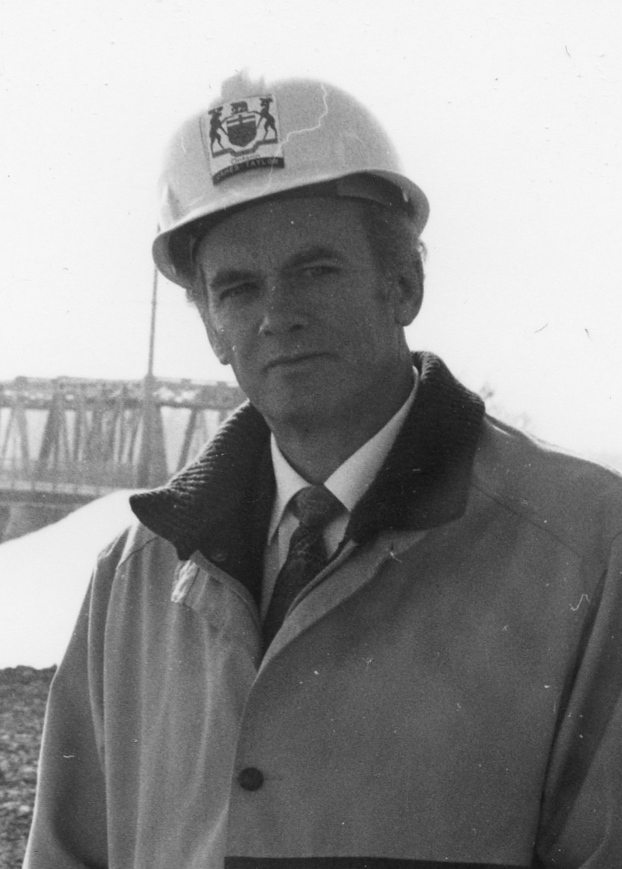
- Taylor in 1979

Ontario MPP
- In office 1971–1987
- Preceded by: Norris Whitney
- Succeeded by: Keith MacDonald
- Constituency: Prince Edward—Lennox

Personal details
- Born: James Allan Taylor; May 2, 1928 Timmins, Ontario, Canada
- Died: September 1, 2020 (aged 92) Belleville, Ontario, Canada
- Party: Progressive Conservative
- Spouse: Mary Marguerite Robinson (m. 1950)
- Education: University of Toronto, Osgoode Hall Law School
- Occupation: Lawyer

James Allan Taylor (May 2, 1928 – September 1, 2020) was a lawyer and politician in Ontario, Canada. He served in the Legislative Assembly of Ontario from 1971 to 1987 and was a cabinet minister in the government of Bill Davis. Taylor was a member of the Progressive Conservative Party.

== Politics ==
Taylor campaigned for the House of Commons of Canada in the 1968 federal election, as a candidate of the federal Progressive Conservative Party. He finished third in Scarborough East, against Liberal candidate Martin Patrick O'Connell.

He was elected to the Ontario legislature in the 1971 provincial election, defeating Liberal candidate Barry Young by 3,404 votes in Prince Edward—Lennox. He served as a backbench supporter of Bill Davis's government for the next four years, and was re-elected with a reduced majority in the 1975 election. On October 7, 1975, Taylor was appointed to Davis's cabinet as Minister of Community and Social Services.

Taylor was named as Davis's Minister of Energy on February 3, 1977, and was re-elected with a greatly increased majority in the 1977 election. He was dropped from cabinet on January 21, 1978, and again served as a government backbencher. He was re-elected in the elections of 1981 and 1985.

After serving in government for forty-two years, the Progressive Conservatives were reduced to a tenuous minority government in the 1985 election, and were subsequently defeated in the legislature on a motion of non-confidence. Taylor served in opposition as his party's Energy Critic, and did not run for re-election in 1987.

Taylor served as the first mayor of the amalgamated Prince Edward County from 1997 to 2003. Taylor died on September 1, 2020, aged 92.

=== Cabinet positions ===
Davis ministry, Province of Ontario (1971–1985)
Cabinet posts (2)
Predecessor	Office	Successor
Dennis Timbrell	Minister of Energy; 1977–1978	Reuben Baetz
Rene Brunelle	Minister of Community and Social Services; 1975–1977	Keith Norton
