= Todd Smith (Canadian politician) =

Canadian politician (born 1970)

The Honourable Todd Smith ECO
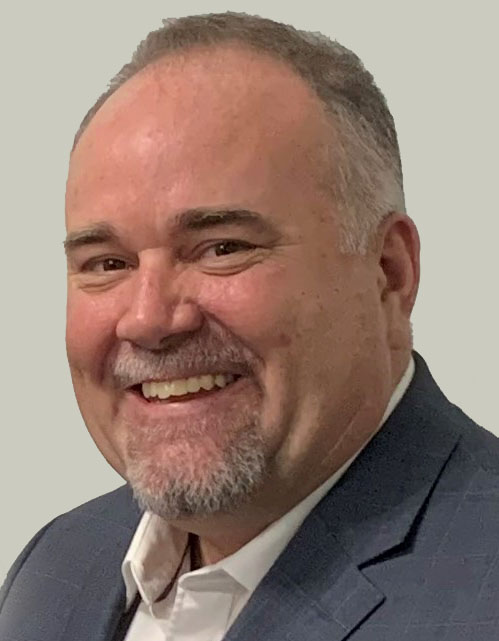
- Smith in 2020

Minister of Education
- In office June 6, 2024 – August 16, 2024
- Premier: Doug Ford
- Preceded by: Stephen Lecce
- Succeeded by: Jill Dunlop

Minister of Energy
- In office June 20, 2021 – June 6, 2024
- Premier: Doug Ford
- Preceded by: Greg Rickford
- Succeeded by: Stephen Lecce

Minister of Children, Community and Social Services
- In office June 20, 2019 – June 18, 2021
- Preceded by: Lisa MacLeod
- Succeeded by: Merrilee Fullerton

Government House Leader
- In office June 29, 2018 – June 20, 2019
- Premier: Doug Ford
- Preceded by: Yasir Naqvi
- Succeeded by: Paul Calandra

Minister of Government and Consumer Services
- In office June 29, 2018 – November 5, 2018
- Premier: Doug Ford
- Preceded by: Tracy MacCharles
- Succeeded by: Bill Walker

Minister of Economic Development, Job Creation and Trade
- In office November 2, 2018 – June 20, 2019
- Premier: Doug Ford
- Preceded by: Jim Wilson
- Succeeded by: Vic Fedeli

Member of the Ontario Provincial Parliament for Bay of Quinte Prince Edward—Hastings (2011–2018)
- In office October 6, 2011 – August 16, 2024
- Preceded by: Leona Dombrowsky
- Succeeded by: Tyler Allsopp

Personal details
- Born: Todd Andrew Smith; October 7, 1970 (age 55) Riverview, New Brunswick, Canada
- Party: Progressive Conservative
- Occupation: Politician, radio broadcaster

Todd Andrew Smith ECO (born October 7, 1970) is a former Canadian politician and Ontario cabinet minister. He was the member of Provincial Parliament (MPP) for Bay of Quinte from 2018 until 2024, and previously represented Prince Edward—Hastings from 2011 to 2018. Smith is a member of the Progressive Conservative party and has held a number of cabinet positions under Doug Ford, including Minister of Government and Consumer Services from June to November 2018; Minister of Economic Development, Job Creation and Trade from November 2018 to June 2019; Ontario Government House Leader from June 2018 to June 2019; and Minister of Children, Community and Social Services from June 2019 to June 2021; and Minister of Energy from June 2021 to June 2024, and Minister of Education from June to August 2024. On August 16, 2024, Smith announced that he was resigning from cabinet and as an MPP effective immediately to take up a private sector position with Candu Energy as Vice-President of Marketing and Business Development.

== Background ==
Smith was born and raised in Riverview, New Brunswick. A graduate of Loyalist College, he worked for more than 16 years on the radio with Quinte Broadcasting's CJBQ, Mix 97 and Rock 107, eventually becoming the news director for Quinte Broadcasting.

== Politics ==
Smith ran in the 2011 provincial election as the Progressive Conservative candidate in the riding of Prince Edward—Hastings. He defeated Liberal incumbent Leona Dombrowsky by 3,130 votes. He was re-elected in the 2014 provincial election defeating Liberal candidate Georgina Thompson by 4,107 votes. He was again re-elected in the 2018 provincial election with 48 per cent of the vote, 8,161 votes ahead of runner-up Joanne Belanger of the NDP.

=== Service in the Official Opposition ===
During his time in opposition, Smith introduced several private member's bills.

In November 2011, he proposed the Local Municipality Democracy Act which would have restored municipal zoning authority over green energy projects in Ontario. The bill was defeated after its first reading. Once elected in 2018 the Progressive Conservative Government restored municipal rights to oppose renewable energy projects with the Green Energy Repeal Act, 2018, in line with the intent of Smith’s bill.

In May 2012, he introduced the Electronic Commerce Amendment Act with Liberal MPP Yasir Naqvi. It would have allowed for the use of electronic signatures on real estate transactions. When the legislature was prorogued on October 15, the bill was removed from the order paper along with all other business. It was reintroduced on March 6, 2013, and it passed its second reading on March 21 before being adopted by the government as a part of the 2013 budget.

In February 2014, he introduced the Tamil Heritage Month Act in order to proclaim January as Tamil Heritage Month. This bill passed its third reading on March 17, 2014, and received royal assent on March 25, 2014. The Tamil Heritage Month Act “recognizes the valuable contributions that Tamil Canadians have made to Ontario’s social, economic political and cultural fabric.”

In February 2015, he introduced the Raise a Glass to Ontario Act to reduce restrictions on Ontario craft breweries, wineries and distillers by allowing them to sell each others’ products. This bill won the support of groups including Ontario Craft Brewers and the Wine Council of Ontario, but ultimately was not passed by the Liberal majority government.

While serving as an Opposition MPP in the Ontario Legislature, Smith spent time as his party's critic for the small businesses and red tape reduction, the Pan American and Parapan American Games, citizenship and immigration, the Hydro One Sale, natural resources and forestry, and energy.

In 2018, Smith briefly considered running to succeed Patrick Brown as leader of the Ontario Progressive Conservative Party. Citing family and financial reasons, he decided not to seek the position.

=== Minister of Government and Consumer Services ===
The Progressive Conservatives formed government following the 2018 Ontario election and, on June 29, 2018, Premier Doug Ford appointed Smith to cabinet as Minister of Government and Consumer Services while serving concurrently as the Government House Leader.

=== Minister of Economic Development, Job Creation and Trade ===
On November 2, 2018, Smith was appointed Minister of Economic Development, Job Creation and Trade while maintaining his role as Government House Leader.

On February 14, 2019, Smith launched the government’s Driving Prosperity auto plan that set out a 10-year vision for how industry, the research and education sectors and government could work together to strengthen the auto sector’s competitiveness. The plan included action items that focused on creating a competitive business climate, supporting innovation, and creating talent.

During his tenure as Minister of Economic Development, Job Creation and Trade, Smith introduced Bill 66, the Restoring Ontario’s Competitiveness Act in the Legislative Assembly of Ontario. This legislative package included more than 30 actions to reduce the burden on job creators by cutting business costs, harmonizing regulatory requirements with other jurisdictions, and reducing barriers to investment. Bill 66 passed third reading on April 2, 2019 and received royal assent on April 3, 2019.

=== Minister of Children, Community and Social Services ===
On June 20, 2019, Smith was appointed Minister of Children, Community and Social Services.

In response to the COVID-19 pandemic, Smith led the development of the COVID-19 Action Plan for Vulnerable People to better protect vulnerable populations in high risk settings including homes serving those with developmental disabilities, shelters for survivors of gender-based violence and human trafficking, children’s residential settings and those residential settings supporting vulnerable indigenous individuals and families both on and off reserve. Smith also played a critical role in other COVID-19 pandemic programs including the rollout of Temporary Pandemic Pay and the Temporary Wage Enhancement which supported more than 47,000 eligible workers in children, community and social services sectors.

On September 16, 2020, Smith introduced Bill 202, the Soldiers' Aid Commission Act. This bill expanded access to financial assistance from the Ontario Soldiers’ Aid Commission to all veterans and their families regardless of where and when they served. Under previous legislation, support was limited to those who served in the First and Second World War and the Korean War. Bill 202 was passed at its third reading in the Legislative Assembly of Ontario on November 3, 2020, and received royal assent on November 12, 2020.

In 2021, Smith introduced Ontario’s Vision for Social Assistance Transformation focussed on helping more people move towards employment and independence. Smith also introduced a long-term vision for developmental services, Journey to Belonging: Choice and Inclusion. This plan outlined the ministry’s vision for how people with developmental disabilities, government and service providers can work together to ensure people are supported to participate in their communities and live fulfilling lives.

=== Minister of Energy ===
On June 18, 2021, Smith was appointed Minister of Energy. Smith is familiar with this file having previously served as the Official Opposition’s energy critic from 2015 to 2018 before the election of the Doug Ford government.

As Minister of Energy, Smith oversaw programs to respond to the COVID-19 pandemic including the announcement of the Ontario Business Costs Rebate Program which would offset energy costs for businesses impacted by public health measures. Smith also announced Canada’s first grid-scale small modular reactor, the introduction of a new Green Button standard to provide more transparency for energy users and provided direction to the Independent Electricity System Operator on future procurement of electricity to ensure resource adequacy.

=== Minister of Education ===
On June 6, 2024, Smith was appointed Minister of Education, succeeding Stephen Lecce. On August 16, 2024, Smith announced his resignation from cabinet and as an MPP to take up a private sector position. The September 19, 2024 provincial by-election elected Tyler Allsopp to replace Smith.

=== Cabinet positions ===
Ford ministry, Province of Ontario (2018–present)
Cabinet posts (5)
| Predecessor | Office | Successor |
|---|---|---|
| Stephen Lecce | Ontario Minister of Education; June 6, 2024 – August 16, 2024 | Jill Dunlop |
| Greg Rickford | Ontario Minister of Energy; June 18, 2021 – June 6, 2024 | Stephen Lecce |
| Lisa MacLeod | Ontario Minister of Children, Community and Social Services; June 20, 2019 – June 18, 2021 | Merrilee Fullerton |
| Jim Wilson | Minister of Economic Development, Job Creation and Trade; November 2, 2018 – June 20, 2019; Was officially sworn in as the Minister on November 5, 2018 | Vic Fedeli |
| Tracy MacCharles | Minister of Government and Consumer Services; June 29, 2018 – November 5, 2018 | Bill Walker |
Special Parliamentary Responsibilities
| Predecessor | Title | Successor |
| Yasir Naqvi | Government House Leader; June 29, 2018 – June 20, 2019 | Paul Calandra |

== Post-political career ==
On August 30, 2024, Candu Energy issued a statement that Smith would be joining as their Vice-President of Marketing and Business Development.

== Election results ==
2022 Ontario general election: Bay of Quinte
| Party | Candidate | Votes | % | ±% | Expenditures |
|---|---|---|---|---|---|
| Progressive Conservative | Todd Smith | 21,381 | 49.30 | +1.28 | $76,706 |
| New Democratic | Alison Kelly | 9,073 | 20.92 | −10.92 | $55,474 |
| Liberal | Emilie Leneveu | 8,003 | 18.45 | +3.56 | $31,230 |
| Green | Erica Charlton | 2,719 | 6.27 | +2.84 | $0 |
| New Blue | Rob Collins | 1,128 | 2.60 | | $5,066 |
| Ontario Party | Noah Wales | 1,062 | 2.45 | | $3,779 |
| Total valid votes/expense limit | | 43,366 | 99.59 | | $133,230 |
| Total rejected, unmarked, and declined ballots | | 179 | 0.41 | -0.68 | |
| Turnout | | 43,545 | 45.91 | -10.55 | |
| Eligible voters | | 94,852 | | | |
| Progressive Conservative hold | | Swing | | +6.10 | |
Source(s): "Summary of Valid Votes Cast for Each Candidate" (PDF). Elections Ontario. Archived from the original on May 18, 2023.; "Statistical Summary by Electoral District" (PDF). Elections Ontario. Archived from the original on May 21, 2023.

2014 Ontario general election: Prince Edward—Hastings
| Party | Candidate | Votes | % | ±% |
|---|---|---|---|---|
| Progressive Conservative | Todd Smith | 19,281 | 41.72 | -0.56 |
| Liberal | Georgina Thompson | 15,105 | 32.68 | -2.56 |
| New Democratic | Merrill Stewart | 8,829 | 19.10 | +2.52 |
| Green | Anita Payne | 2,448 | 5.30 | +0.69 |
| Libertarian | Lindsay Forbes | 555 | 1.20 | +0.75 |
| Total valid votes | | 46,218 | 98.68 | |
| Total rejected, unmarked, and declined ballots | | 620 | 1.32 | +0.98 |
| Turnout | | 46,838 | 51.61 | -0.14 |
| Eligible voters | | 90,761 | | |
| Progressive Conservative hold | | Swing | | +1.00 |
Source: Elections Ontario

2011 Ontario general election: Prince Edward—Hastings
| Party | Candidate | Votes | % | ±% |
|---|---|---|---|---|
| Progressive Conservative | Todd Smith | 18,816 | 42.28 | +9.46 |
| Liberal | Leona Dombrowsky | 15,686 | 35.25 | -11.11 |
| New Democratic | Sherry Hayes | 7,379 | 16.58 | +2.68 |
| Green | Treat Hull | 2,049 | 4.60 | -1.29 |
| Family Coalition | Neal Ford | 257 | 0.58 | -0.08 |
| Libertarian | Andrew Skinner | 201 | 0.45 | |
| Republican | Trueman Tuck | 115 | 0.26 | -0.11 |
| Total valid votes | | 44,503 | 99.66 | |
| Total rejected, unmarked and declined ballots | | 152 | 0.34 | -0.23 |
| Turnout | | 44,655 | 51.74 | -2.42 |
| Eligible voters | | 86,304 | | |
| Progressive Conservative gain from Liberal | | Swing | | +10.29 |
Source: Elections Ontario
