= John Donald Baxter =

Canadian politician from Ontario

Member of the Ontario Provincial Parliament for Prince Edward—Lennox
- In office June 7, 1948 – October 6, 1951
- Preceded by: James de Congalton Hepburn
- Succeeded by: Norris Whitney

Personal details
- Party: Liberal

John Donald Baxter was a Canadian politician who was Liberal MPP for the eastern Ontario riding of Prince Edward—Lennox from 1948 to 1951.

== See also ==
- 23rd Parliament of Ontario
