= Norris Whitney =

Canadian politician

Ontario MPP
- In office 1951–1971
- Preceded by: John Donald Baxter
- Succeeded by: James Taylor
- Constituency: Prince Edward—Lennox

Personal details
- Born: March 28, 1908; Prince Edward County, Ontario
- Died: January 11, 1980 (aged 71); Prince Edward County
- Political party: Progressive Conservative
- Occupation: Farmer

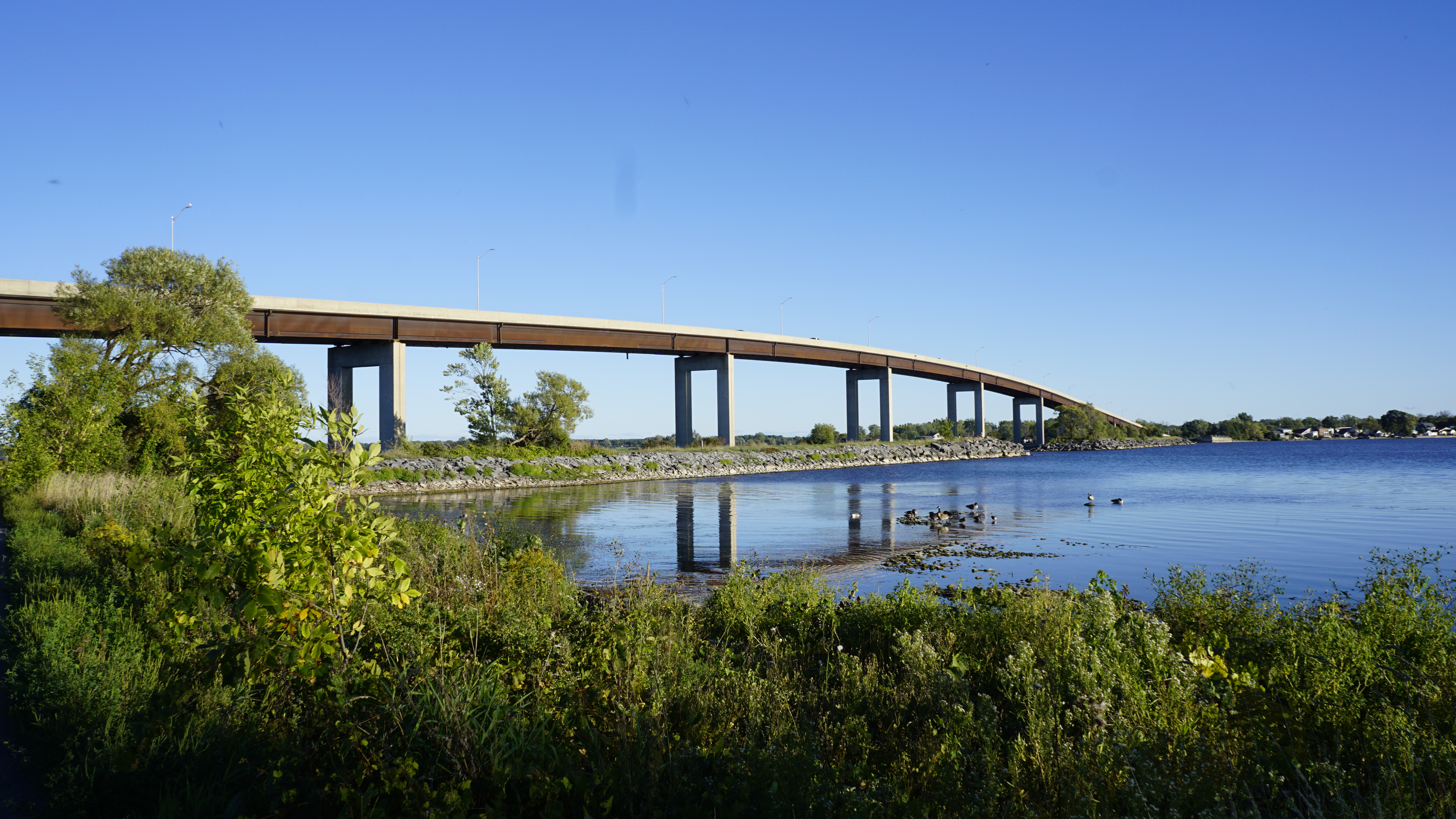
The Norris Whitney Bridge

Norris Eldon Howe Whitney (March 28, 1908 – January 11, 1980) was a Canadian politician, who represented Prince Edward—Lennox in the Legislative Assembly of Ontario from 1951 to 1971 as a Progressive Conservative member.

Whitney was born in Prince Edward County, Ontario, the son of David Henry Whitney and Ida May Wycott.

Originally elected in the general election in 1951, he was re-elected in the general elections in 1955, 1959, 1963 and 1967, becoming the longest-serving MPP in that riding. During his four terms in office, Whitney was never appointed to Cabinet, but did sit on an average of ten Standing Committees during each term. Prior to being elected, Whitney was a sheep farmer in Prince Edward County. In 1980, Whitney died in a fire which destroyed his farm operation. In 1982, a new arch bridge constructed to connect the east end of Prince Edward County to Belleville (provincial Highway 62) was named the Norris Whitney Bridge, in tribute to his lengthy public service.

Whitney is buried at the Albury Church Cemetery, Prince Edward County, Ontario.
