= Loyalist College =

Public college in Ontario, Canada

Coordinates: 44°9′14.81″N 77°25′50.00″W

- Type: Public
- Established: 1967
- Affiliations: CCAA, ACCC, AUCC, CBIE
- President: Mark Kirkpatrick
- Students: 2025: 2,233 FTEs
- Location: Belleville, Ontario, Canada
- Campus: Belleville, Bancroft, Port Hope
- Sports teams: Lancers & Lady Lancers
- Colours: Red and blue
- Website: www.loyalistcollege.com

Loyalist College (formally Loyalist College of Applied Arts and Technology) is an English-language college in Belleville, Ontario, Canada that is partnered with private Toronto Business College and has campuses in Bancroft and Port Hope.

== History ==
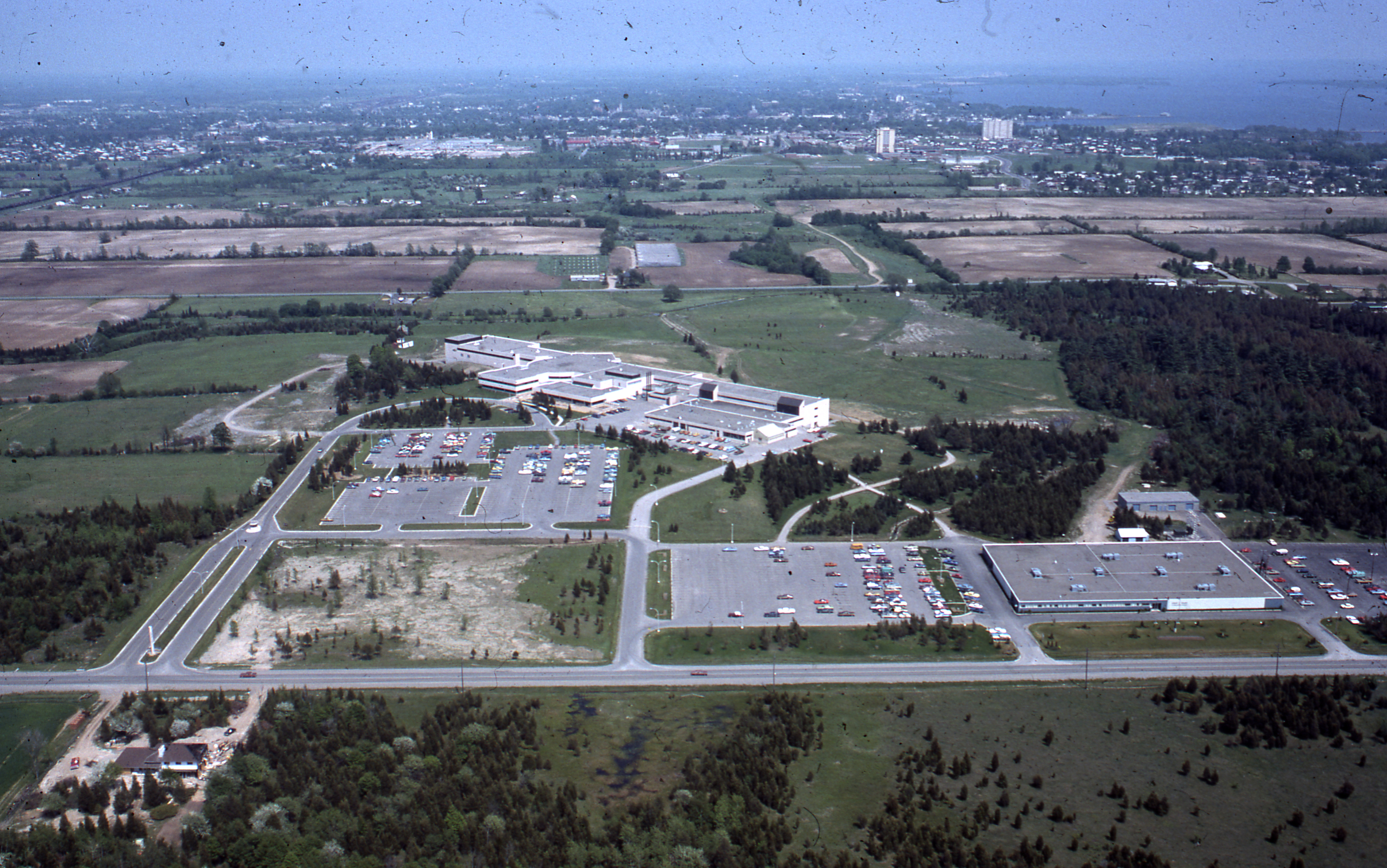
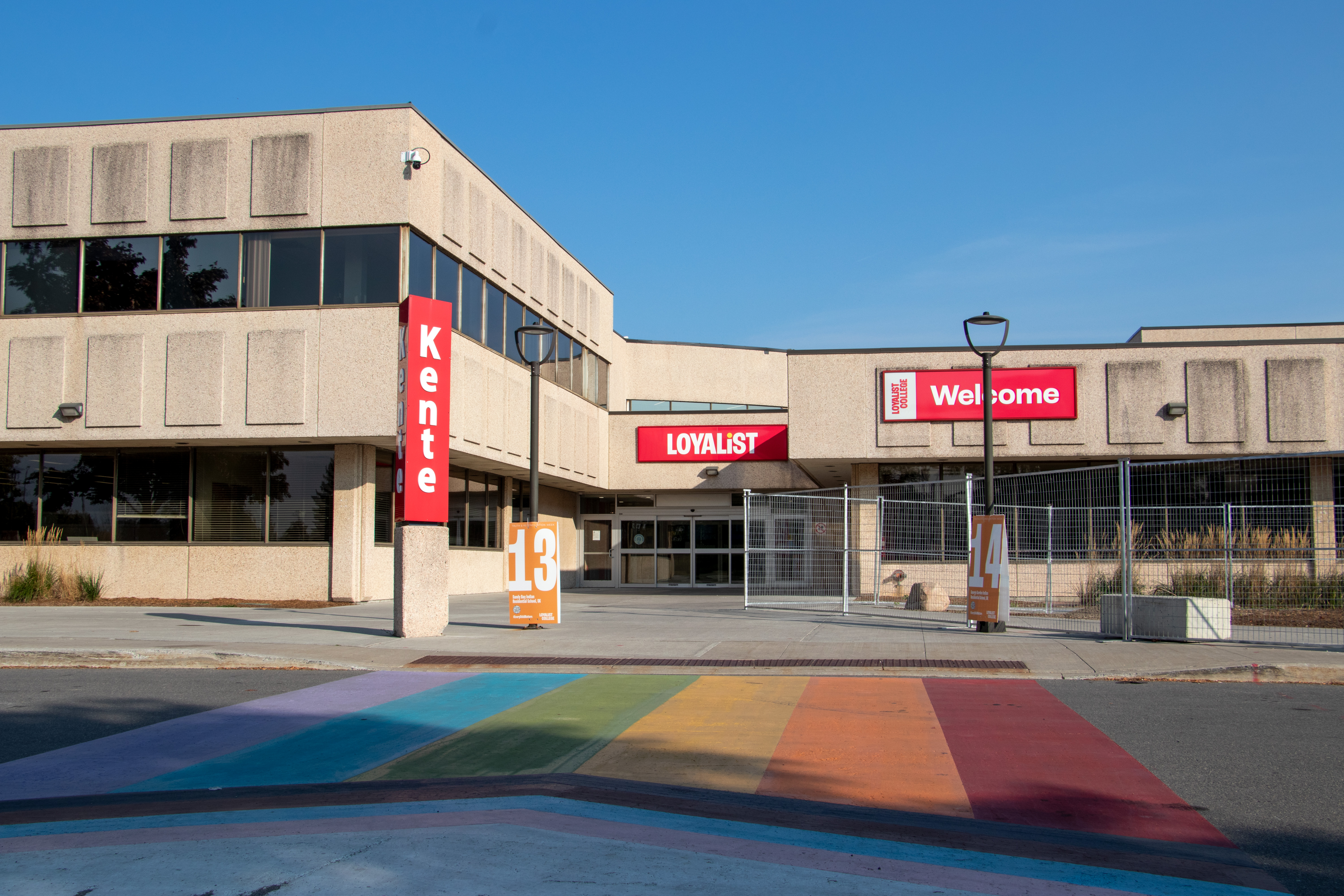
Aerial photo of Loyalist College, 1975 (left), Main entrance of the Kente Building, 2023 (right).

Prior to the 1960s, only trade schools co-existed with universities in the province of Ontario at the post-secondary level, most of which had been established primarily to help veterans reintegrate into society in the post-war years. Loyalist College was founded in 1967 as part of a provincial initiative to create many such institutions to provide career-oriented diploma and certificate courses, as well as continuing education programs to Ontario communities. The name of the college reflects the area's original settlement by United Empire Loyalists.

Originally operated out of a local high school, Loyalist College moved to its present 200-acre (81 ha) campus on Wallbridge-Loyalist Road in 1968. The college operates a satellite campus in Bancroft, Ontario and is associated with First Nations Technical Institute in the Tyendinaga Mohawk Territory reserve.

The college provides education to local Canadians that are native to Belleville or neighboring towns, but many of the students at Loyalist College also come from South Asian countries as immigrants on international visas. Beginning in 2018 the college say double digit expansion from international students while Canadian enrollment remained flat. In 2021 the college had reached an unprecedented level of new international study permits with nearly 5000 being approved. The following year saw more than 4000 more approved.

Following the unprecedented growth in international enrollment in 2021 and 2022 the mayor of Belleville launched a probe into overcrowded student housing, telling “people who are overcrowding housing, we’re coming for you.” In 2023 an Indian student who was part of a group of illegal migrants who froze to death near the United States border was accused of using forged documents to apply to Loyalist, later that year students with fake acceptance letters from Loyalist faced being deported.

In March of 2025 Loyalist suspended 24 programs and reduced staff by 20%. In the August a further 36 faculty were laid off. The faculty association went on strike in September.

== Athletics ==
Loyalist's intercollegiate sports teams use the name "Lancers". The school colours are royal blue and scarlet.

=== Current athletic teams ===
- Men's Volleyball
- Women's Volleyball
- Men's Basketball
- Women's Basketball
- Men's Rugby
- Women’s Rugby 7s
- Women's Soccer
- Cross-country

== Residence ==
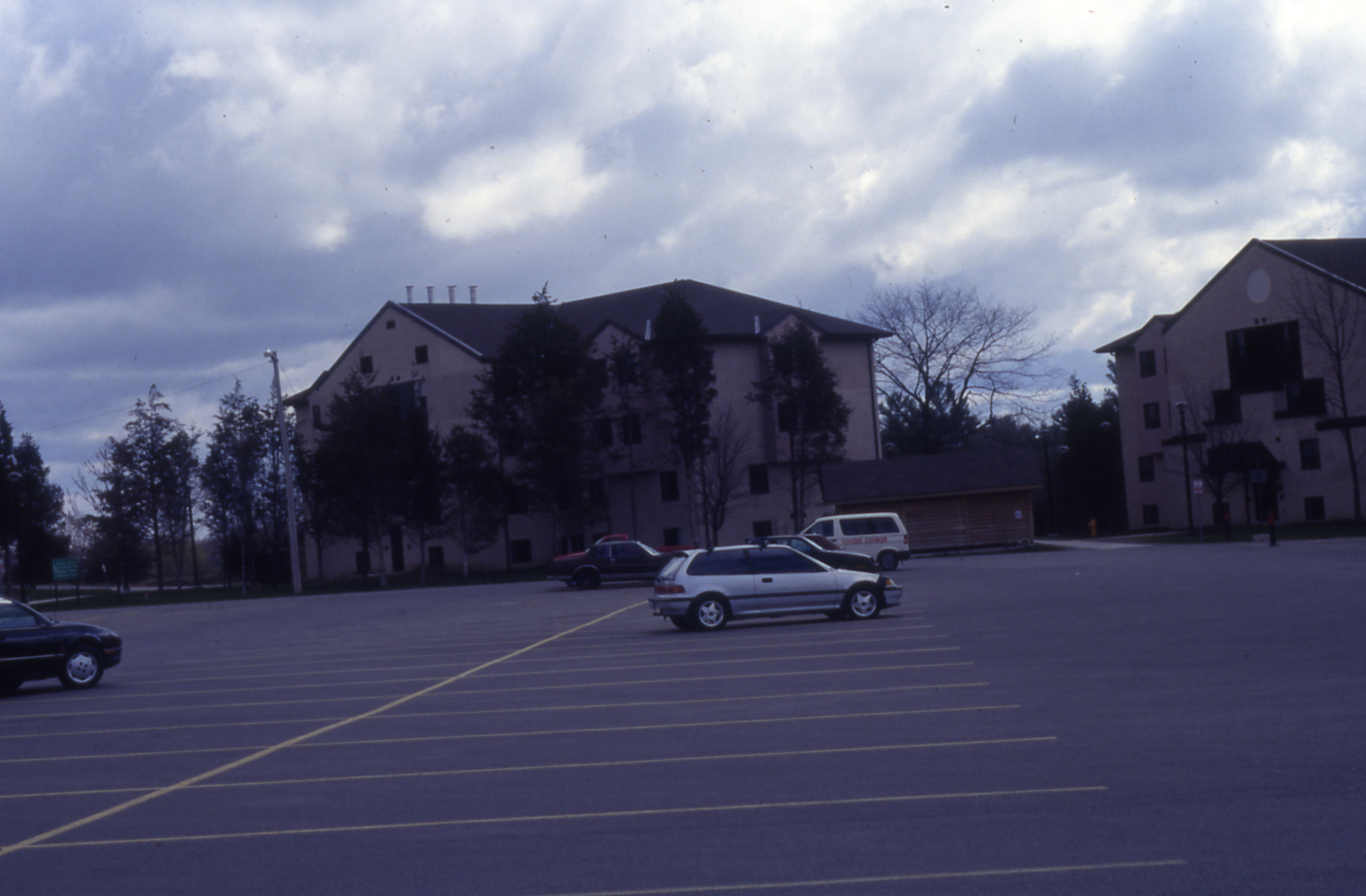
Student residences at Loyalist College, 1994.

Loyalist College houses some of its students in the Loyalist College Residence located on the college campus. The residence contains five buildings and holds approximately 474 students. There are also 4 townhouse blocks housing 112 students. Located on the residence grounds is Residence Commons. This building contains laundry facilities, computer access, security office, food station and entertainment area. The entertainment area includes pool tables, ping-pong and television for student use.

== Scholarships ==
The College joined Project Hero, a scholarship program cofounded by General (Ret'd) Rick Hillier for the families of fallen Canadian Forces members.

== Notable students, alumni and faculty ==
Older logo in use prior to 2021.

- Henry Joseph Maloney, first chairman of the board
- Former CHFI-FM Morning Host Erin Davis
- Ernie Parsons Former MPP for Prince Edward—Hastings (Former Faculty)
- Jamie Schmale MP for Haliburton-Kawartha Lakes-Brock
- Todd Smith Ontario Minister of Energy and MPP for Bay of Quinte
- Laurie Scott MPP for Haliburton—Kawartha Lakes—Brock
- The Honourable Chris d'Entremont MP for West Nova and former MLA for Argyle-Barrington
- David Williams – former professional cyclist
- The Honourable Scott Simms - former Weather Network personality and Member of Parliament for Coast of Bays

== See also ==
- Canadian government scientific research organizations
- Canadian industrial research and development organizations
- Canadian Interuniversity Sport
- Canadian university scientific research organizations
- Higher education in Ontario
- List of colleges in Ontario
