= Keith MacDonald =

Canadian politician (1927–2021)

Ontario MPP
- In office 1987–1990
- Preceded by: James A. Taylor
- Succeeded by: Riding abolished
- Constituency: Prince Edward—Lennox

Personal details
- Born: July 18, 1927 Picton, Ontario, Canada
- Died: March 27, 2021 (aged 93) Picton, Ontario, Canada
- Party: Liberal
- Occupation: Businessman

Keith Ostrander MacDonald (July 18, 1927 – March 27, 2021) was a politician in Ontario, Canada.

MacDonald was educated at Albert College in Belleville, Ontario, and worked as a businessman, farmer and tourist operator. He was a member of the Belleville McFarlands, World Hockey Champions in 1959. He served in the Legislative Assembly of Ontario as a Liberal from 1987 to 1990.

He first ran for the Ontario legislature in the 1975 provincial election, but lost to Progressive Conservative James Taylor by 732 votes in the riding of Prince Edward—Lennox. He ran again in the 1987 election, and defeated Progressive Conservative candidate Dennis Tompkins by 2,079 votes. For the next three years, MacDonald served as a backbench supporter of David Peterson's government.

The Liberals were defeated by the New Democratic Party in the 1990 provincial election. MacDonald finished third in his bid for re-election, finishing 1,016 votes behind Paul Johnson of the NDP.

MacDonald was involved with the Prince Edward Federation of Agriculture. He died on March 27, 2021, at the Hospice Prince Edward in Picton, Ontario.
