= Prince Edward—Lennox (provincial electoral district) =

Ontario electoral district

Defunct provincial electoral district
- Legislature: Legislative Assembly of Ontario
- District created: 1933
- District abolished: 1996
- First contested: 1934
- Last contested: 1995

Prince Edward—Lennox was an electoral riding in Ontario, Canada. It was created in 1933 before the 1934 election. In 1990 it was renamed and redistributed as Prince Edward—Lennox—South Hastings. In 1996 it was redistributed and merged into the riding of Prince Edward—Hastings before the 1999 election.

== Members of Provincial Parliament ==
Prince Edward—Lennox
Assembly	Years	Member	Party
Created from Prince Edward and Lennox ridings before the 1934 election
19th	1934–1937	Thomas Gilmore Bowerman	Liberal
20th	1937–1943	James de Congalton Hepburn	Conservative
21st	1943–1945	James de Congalton Hepburn	Progressive Conservative
22nd	1945–1948	James de Congalton Hepburn	Progressive Conservative
23rd	1948–1951	John Donald Baxter	Liberal
24th	1951–1955	Norris Whitney	Progressive Conservative
25th	1955–1959	Norris Whitney	Progressive Conservative
26th	1959–1963	Norris Whitney	Progressive Conservative
27th	1963–1967	Norris Whitney	Progressive Conservative
28th	1967–1971	Norris Whitney	Progressive Conservative
29th	1971–1975	James A. Taylor	Progressive Conservative
30th	1975–1977	James A. Taylor	Progressive Conservative
31st	1977–1981	James A. Taylor	Progressive Conservative
32nd	1981–1985	James A. Taylor	Progressive Conservative
33rd	1985–1987	James A. Taylor	Progressive Conservative
34th	1987–1990	Keith MacDonald	Liberal
Prince Edward—Lennox—South Hastings
35th	1990–1995	Paul Johnston	New Democratic
36th	1995–1999	Gary Fox	Progressive Conservative
Sourced from the Ontario Legislative Assembly
Merged into Prince Edward—Hastings before the 1999 election

== Election results ==
1995 Ontario general election: Prince Edward—Lennox—South Hastings
Party	Candidate	Votes	%	±%
Progressive Conservative	Gary Fox	14,144	49.61	+19.71
Liberal	Robert Gentile	7,798	27.35	–2.15
New Democratic	Paul Johnson	5,996	21.03	–12.13
Confederation of Regions	Kenn Hineman	571	2.00	–5.42
Total valid votes		28,509	99.14	
Total rejected, unmarked and declined ballots		246	0.86	+0.02
Turnout		28,755	60.04	–1.41
Eligible voters		47,891		
Progressive Conservative gain from New Democratic		Swing		+15.92
Source: Elections Ontario

1990 Ontario general election: Prince Edward—Lennox—South Hastings
Party	Candidate	Votes	%	±%
New Democratic	Paul Johnson	9,204	33.17	+15.39
Progressive Conservative	Don Bonter	8,299	29.90	–7.30
Liberal	Keith MacDonald	8,188	29.50	–15.52
Confederation of Regions	Kenn Hineman	2,061	7.43	–
Total valid votes		27,752	99.16	
Total rejected, unmarked and declined ballots		234	0.84	
Turnout		27,986	61.45	
Eligible voters		45,542		
New Democratic gain from Liberal		Swing		+15.46
Source: Elections Ontario

1987 Ontario general election
Party	Candidate	Votes	%	±%
Liberal	Keith MacDonald	11,961	45.02	+9.35
Progressive Conservative	Dennis Tompkins	9,882	37.20	–15.24
New Democratic	Paul Johnson	4,724	17.78	+5.89
Total valid votes		26,567	99.54	
Total rejected ballots		122	0.46	–0.10
Turnout		26,689	61.11	+3.67
Eligible voters		43,673		
Liberal gain from Progressive Conservative		Swing		+12.30
Source: Elections Ontario

1985 Ontario general election
Party	Candidate	Votes	%	±%
Progressive Conservative	James A. Taylor	10,170	52.44	–5.09
Liberal	Gordon Mylks	6,918	35.67	+0.55
New Democratic	Harry Plummer	2,307	11.89	+4.54
Total valid votes		19,395	99.44	
Total rejected ballots		109	0.56	+0.14
Turnout		19,504	57.44	–3.65
Eligible voters		33,953		
Progressive Conservative hold		Swing		–2.82
Source: Elections Ontario

1981 Ontario general election
Party	Candidate	Votes	%	±%
Progressive Conservative	James A. Taylor	11,135	57.53	+2.31
Liberal	Dan Brady	6,797	35.12	+7.25
New Democratic	Bob King	1,423	7.35	–9.56
Total valid votes		19,355	99.58	
Total rejected ballots		81	0.42	+0.11
Turnout		19,436	61.10	–6.81
Eligible voters		31,812		
Progressive Conservative hold		Swing		–2.47
Source: Elections Ontario

1977 Ontario general election
Party	Candidate	Votes	%	±%
Progressive Conservative	James A. Taylor	11,411	55.22	+10.90
Liberal	Mary Kaiser	5,759	27.87	–13.08
New Democratic	Jan Nicol	3,494	16.91	+2.18
Total valid votes		20,664	99.69	
Total rejected ballots		64	0.31	–0.01
Turnout		20,728	67.91	–6.41
Eligible voters		30,525		
Progressive Conservative hold		Swing		+11.99
Source: Elections Ontario

1975 Ontario general election
Party	Candidate	Votes	%	±%
Progressive Conservative	James A. Taylor	9,628	44.32	–8.46
Liberal	Keith MacDonald	8,895	40.95	+6.14
New Democratic	Jan Nicol	3,200	14.73	+2.32
Total valid votes		21,723	99.68	
Total rejected ballots		69	0.32	–0.16
Turnout		21,792	74.32	+0.23
Eligible voters		29,322		
Progressive Conservative hold		Swing		–7.30
Source: Elections Ontario

1971 Ontario general election
Party	Candidate	Votes	%	±%
Progressive Conservative	James A. Taylor	9,995	52.78	–4.98
Liberal	Barry Young	6,591	34.81	+3.11
New Democratic	Bryan Beazer	2,350	12.41	+1.87
Total valid votes		18,936	99.53	
Total rejected ballots		90	0.47	–0.29
Turnout		19,026	74.09	+13.54
Eligible voters		25,680		
Progressive Conservative hold		Swing		–4.04
Source: Elections Ontario

1967 Ontario general election
Party	Candidate	Votes	%	±%
Progressive Conservative	Norris Whitney	7,471	57.76	–4.20
Liberal	Fred Evans	4,100	31.70	+1.21
New Democratic	James Flint	1,363	10.54	+2.99
Total valid votes		12,934	99.23	
Total rejected ballots		100	0.77	+0.04
Turnout		13,034	60.54	+0.90
Eligible voters		21,528		
Progressive Conservative hold		Swing		–2.70
Source: Elections Ontario

1963 Ontario general election
Party	Candidate	Votes	%	±%
Progressive Conservative	Norris Whitney	7,645	61.96	+0.22
Liberal	Alex L. Williams	3,762	30.49	–7.76
New Democratic	Rod MacDonald	931	7.55	–
Total valid votes		12,338	99.27	
Total rejected ballots		91	0.73	–0.24
Turnout		12,429	59.64	+1.56
Eligible voters		20,839		
Progressive Conservative hold		Swing		+3.99
Source: Elections Ontario

1959 Ontario general election
Party	Candidate	Votes	%	±%
Progressive Conservative	Norris Whitney	7,249	61.75	+1.46
Liberal	Patrick Beavers	4,491	38.25	–1.46
Total valid votes		11,740	99.03	
Total rejected ballots		115	0.97	+0.23
Turnout		11,855	58.08	–1.07
Eligible voters		20,411		
Progressive Conservative hold		Swing		+1.46
Source: Elections Ontario

1955 Ontario general election
Party	Candidate	Votes	%	±%
Progressive Conservative	Norris Whitney	7,003	60.29	+5.99
Liberal	Percy Mellot	4,613	39.71	–5.99
Total valid votes		11,616	99.26	
Total rejected ballots		87	0.74	+0.00
Turnout		11,703	59.15	–41.24
Eligible voters		19,785		
Progressive Conservative hold		Swing		+5.99
Source: Elections Ontario

1951 Ontario general election
Party	Candidate	Votes	%	±%
Progressive Conservative	Norris Whitney	7,565	54.30	+8.26
Liberal	John Donald Baxter	6,368	45.70	–0.75
Total valid votes		13,933	99.26	
Total rejected ballots		104	0.74	+0.06
Turnout		14,037	100.39	+30.23
Eligible voters		13,982		
Progressive Conservative gain from Liberal		Swing		+4.50
Source: Elections Ontario

1948 Ontario general election
Party	Candidate	Votes	%	±%
Liberal	John Donald Baxter	6,202	46.45	+10.80
Progressive Conservative	James de Congalton Hepburn	6,147	46.04	–11.42
Independent PC	Thomas D. Creighton	1,003	7.51	–
Total valid votes		13,352	99.32	
Total rejected ballots		92	0.68	–0.22
Turnout		13,444	70.16	–0.85
Eligible voters		19,162		
Liberal gain from Progressive Conservative		Swing		+11.11
Source: Elections Ontario

1945 Ontario general election
Party	Candidate	Votes	%	±%
Progressive Conservative	James de Congalton Hepburn	7,583	57.46	+4.82
Liberal	Burton Pearsall	4,705	35.65	–5.26
Co-operative Commonwealth	George N. McKibbon	909	6.89	+0.44
Total valid votes		13,197	99.10	
Total rejected ballots		120	0.90	+0.29
Turnout		13,317	71.01	+11.13
Eligible voters		18,755		
Progressive Conservative hold		Swing		+5.04
Source: Elections Ontario

1943 Ontario general election
Party	Candidate	Votes	%	±%
Progressive Conservative	James de Congalton Hepburn	5,863	52.64	+1.96
Liberal	Burton Pearsall	4,556	40.91	–8.41
Co-operative Commonwealth	Charlotte Brown	718	6.45	–
Total valid votes		11,137	99.39	
Total rejected ballots		68	0.61	–0.14
Turnout		11,205	59.88	–17.93
Eligible voters		18,714		
Progressive Conservative hold		Swing		+5.18
Source: Elections Ontario

1937 Ontario general election
Party	Candidate	Votes	%	±%
Conservative	James de Congalton Hepburn	7,470	50.69	+2.84
Liberal	Thomas Gilmore Bowerman	7,268	49.31	–2.84
Total valid votes		14,738	99.25	
Total rejected ballots		111	0.75	+0.09
Turnout		14,849	77.80	+2.85
Eligible voters		19,086		
Conservative gain from Liberal		Swing		+2.84
Source: Elections Ontario

1934 Ontario general election
Party	Candidate	Votes	%
Liberal	Thomas Gilmore Bowerman	7,866	52.15
Conservative	Horace Stanley Colliver	7,216	47.85
Total valid votes		15,082	99.34
Total rejected ballots		100	0.66
Turnout		15,182	74.95
Eligible voters		20,255	
Liberal pickup new district.			
Source: Elections Ontario
