= Tyler Allsopp =

Canadian politician

Tyler Allsopp MPP
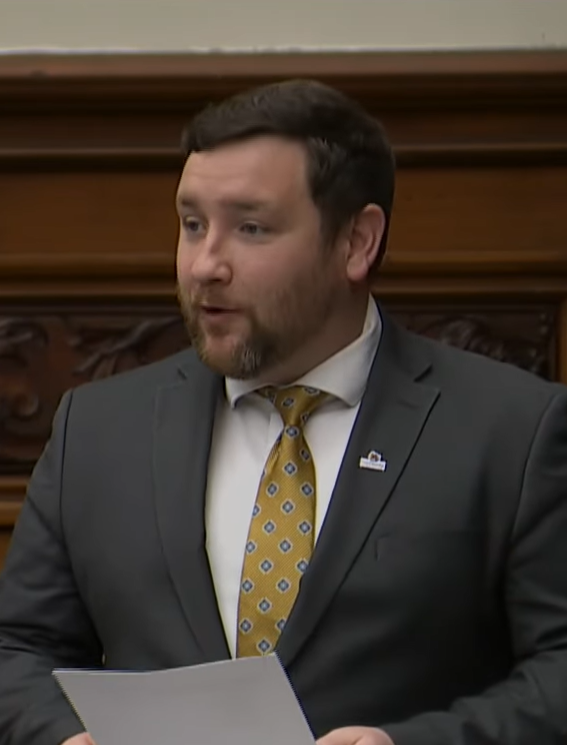
- Allsopp in 2025

Member of the Ontario Provincial Parliament for Bay of Quinte
- Incumbent
- Assumed office September 19, 2024
- Preceded by: Todd Smith

Personal details
- Born: 1992 or 1993 (age 33–34)
- Party: Progressive Conservative
- Website: https://tylerallsoppmpp.ca/

Tyler Allsopp MPP (born 1992 or 1993) is a Canadian politician and Progressive Conservative member of Provincial Parliament (MPP) for Bay of Quinte. He previously served as a member of city council in Belleville as a Ward 1 councillor from 2021 to 2024, and owned a bicycle shop.

== Background ==
Allsopp was raised in Belleville, Ontario. A graduate of St. Lawrence College in Business and Marketing, he worked as a bike mechanic at Doug's Bicycle, owned by Mayor Neil Ellis, before taking the store over in 2013. Allsopp sold his interest in the business in 2024.

He was first elected to the Legislative Assembly of Ontario in a by-election on September 19, 2024, caused by the resignation of Todd Smith. At the time of his election Allsopp had been a member of Belleville city council since 2021. He was appointed to city council in January 2021 following the death of Councillor Pat Culhane, having had the highest votes of the defeated candidates in the 2018 municipal election. Allsopp retained his council seat in the 2022 municipal election.

=== Personal life ===
Allsopp has three daughters.

== Election results ==
2025 Ontario general election: Bay of Quinte
| Party | Candidate | Votes | % | ±% | Expenditures |
|---|---|---|---|---|---|
| Progressive Conservative | Tyler Allsopp | 20,606 | 44.14 | +5.45 | $128,500 |
| Liberal | David O'Neill | 14,652 | 31.38 | –1.94 | $31,613 |
| New Democratic | Amanda Robertson | 8,793 | 18.83 | –4.24 | $41,013 |
| Green | Lori Borthwick | 1,618 | 3.47 | +0.29 | $13,921 |
| New Blue | Anthony Zambito | 518 | 1.11 | +0.12 | $0 |
| Ontario Party | Nick Maddison | 501 | 1.07 | – | – |
| Total valid votes/expense limit | | 46,688 | 99.27 | – | $156,936 |
| Total rejected, unmarked and declined ballots | | 342 | 0.73 | +0.22 | |
| Turnout | | 47,030 | 48.25 | +10.22 | |
| Eligible voters | | 97,476 | | | |
| Progressive Conservative hold | | Swing | | +3.69 | |
Source: Elections Ontario

Ontario provincial by-election, September 19, 2024: Bay of Quinte Resignation of Todd Smith
| Party | Candidate | Votes | % | ±% | Expenditures |
|---|---|---|---|---|---|
| Progressive Conservative | Tyler Allsopp | 14,430 | 38.69 | –10.61 | $140,699 |
| Liberal | Sean Kelly | 12,428 | 33.32 | +14.87 | $105,603 |
| New Democratic | Amanda Robertson | 8,606 | 23.07 | +2.15 | $106,045 |
| Green | Lori Borthwick | 1,186 | 3.18 | –3.09 | $15,616 |
| New Blue | Margaret Schuler | 369 | 0.99 | –1.61 | $0 |
| Independent | John Turmel | 149 | 0.40 | – | $0 |
| Libertarian | Mark Snow | 129 | 0.35 | – | $0 |
| Total valid votes/expense limit | | 37,297 | 99.49 | – | $156,936 |
| Total rejected, unmarked and declined ballots | | 190 | 0.51 | +0.10 | |
| Turnout | | 37,487 | 38.02 | –7.89 | |
| Eligible voters | | 98,590 | | | |
| Progressive Conservative hold | | Swing | | –12.74 | |
Source: Elections Ontario
