= Prince Edward—Hastings (provincial electoral district) =

Coordinates: 44.53°N 77.73°W

Ontario electoral district
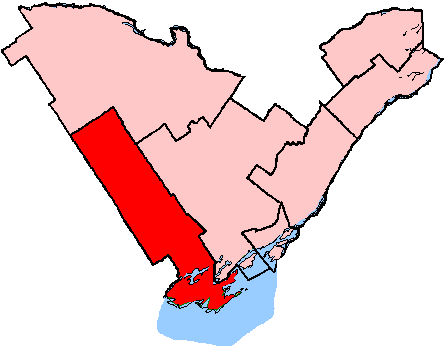
- Prince Edward—Hastings shown within the Eastern Ontario region

Defunct provincial electoral district
- Legislature: Legislative Assembly of Ontario
- District created: 1999
- District abolished: 2018
- First contested: 1999
- Last contested: 2014

Demographics
- Population (2006): 113,227
- Electors (2011): 88,198
- Area (km²): 7,395
- Census division(s): Hastings, Prince Edward
- Census subdivision(s): Bancroft, Belleville, Carlow/Mayo, Centre Hastings, Deseronto, Faraday, Hastings Highlands, Limerick, Madoc, Marmora and Lake, Prince Edward, Stirling-Rawdon, Tudor and Cashel, Tweed, Tyendinaga, Tyendinaga Mohawk Territory, Wollaston

Prince Edward—Hastings was a provincial electoral district in Ontario, Canada, that was represented in the Legislative Assembly of Ontario from 1999 to 2018. Its population in 2006 was 113,227.

== History ==
The provincial electoral district was created in 1999 when provincial ridings were defined to have the same borders as federal ridings. It initially consisted of the County of Prince Edward, and the part of the County of Hastings lying south of and including the townships of Hungerford, Huntingdon and Rawdon, south of but excluding the Village of Stirling, and excluding the City of Trenton.

In 2003, it was redefined to consist of the County of Prince Edward and the County of Hastings (except the City of Quinte West).

For the 2018 election, the district was dissolved into Bay of Quinte and Hastings—Lennox and Addington.

== Members of Provincial Parliament ==
Prince Edward—Hastings
Assembly	Years	Member	Party
Riding created from Quinte and Prince Edward-Lennox-South Hastings
37th	1999–2003	Ernie Parsons	Liberal
38th	2003–2007	Ernie Parsons	Liberal
39th	2007–2011	Leona Dombrowsky	Liberal
40th	2011–2014	Todd Smith	Progressive Conservative
41st	2014–2018	Todd Smith	Progressive Conservative
Riding dissolved into Bay of Quinte and Hastings—Lennox and Addington

== Election results ==
2014 Ontario general election
Party	Candidate	Votes	%	±%
Progressive Conservative	Todd Smith	19,281	41.72	–0.56
Liberal	Georgina Thompson	15,105	32.68	–2.56
New Democratic	Merrill Stewart	8,829	19.10	+2.52
Green	Anita Payne	2,448	5.30	+0.69
Libertarian	Lindsay Forbes	555	1.20	+0.75
Total valid votes		46,218	98.68	
Total rejected, unmarked and declined ballots		620	1.32	+0.98
Turnout		46,838	51.61	–0.14
Eligible voters		90,761		
Progressive Conservative hold		Swing		+1.00
Source: Elections Ontario

2011 Ontario general election
Party	Candidate	Votes	%	±%
Progressive Conservative	Todd Smith	18,816	42.28	+9.46
Liberal	Leona Dombrowsky	15,686	35.25	–11.11
New Democratic	Sherry Hayes	7,379	16.58	+2.68
Green	Treat Hull	2,049	4.60	–1.29
Family Coalition	Neal Ford	257	0.58	–0.08
Libertarian	Andrew Skinner	201	0.45	–
Republican	Trueman Tuck	115	0.26	–0.11
Total valid votes		44,503	99.66	
Total rejected, unmarked and declined ballots		152	0.34	–0.23
Turnout		44,655	51.74	–2.42
Eligible voters		86,304		
Progressive Conservative gain from Liberal		Swing		+10.29
Source: Elections Ontario

2007 Ontario general election
Party	Candidate	Votes	%	±%
Liberal	Leona Dombrowsky	20,963	46.36	–8.80
Progressive Conservative	Eric DenOuden	14,840	32.82	+1.79
New Democratic	Jodie Jenkins	6,287	13.90	+3.55
Green	Jim Arkilander	2,663	5.89	–
Family Coalition	Vito Luceno	297	0.66	–
Republican	Trueman Tuck	166	0.37	–
Total valid votes		45,216	99.43	
Total rejected, unmarked and declined ballots		259	0.57	+0.05
Turnout		45,475	54.16	–3.04
Eligible voters		83,963		
Liberal notional hold		Swing		–5.30
Source: Elections Ontario Note: Change in percentage of vote calculated on results redistributed from predecessor ridings.

2003 general election redistributed results
Party	Vote	%
Liberal	24,447	55.16
Progressive Conservative	13,750	31.03
New Democratic	4,588	10.35
Others	1,532	3.46

2003 Ontario general election
Party	Candidate	Votes	%	±%
Liberal	Ernie Parsons	22,937	57.38	+12.27
Progressive Conservative	John Williams	12,800	32.02	–12.95
New Democratic	Jodie Jenkins	3,377	8.45	+1.23
Green	Joe Ross	628	1.57	+0.47
Freedom	Trueman Tuck	229	0.57	+0.24
Total valid votes		39,971	99.48	
Total rejected, unmarked and declined ballots		208	0.52	–0.21
Turnout		40,179	57.20	+0.21
Eligible voters		70,244		
Liberal hold		Swing		+12.61
Source: Elections Ontario

1999 Ontario general election
Party	Candidate	Votes	%
Liberal	Ernie Parsons	17,987	45.11
Progressive Conservative	Gary Fox	17,931	44.97
New Democratic	Bev Campbell	2,877	7.22
Green	Shawn Talbot	441	1.11
Confederation of Regions	Marie Hineman	203	0.51
Independent	Kevin Rivers	188	0.47
Independent	Trueman Tuck	133	0.33
Natural Law	Sylvie Poirier	111	0.28
Total valid votes		39,871	99.27
Total rejected, unmarked and declined ballots		294	0.73
Turnout		40,165	56.98
Eligible voters		70,484	
Liberal pickup new district.			
Source: Elections Ontario

== 2007 electoral reform referendum ==
2007 Ontario electoral reform referendum
Side	Votes	%
First Past the Post	29,063	66.1
Mixed member proportional	14,274	33.9
Total valid votes	43,337	100.0

== Sources ==
- Elections Ontario Past Election Results
