= New Nuclear at Wesleyville =

Proposed nuclear power station in Ontario, Canada

- Abandoned oil-fired power plant where New Nuclear at Wesleyville will be built
- Country: Canada
- Location: Wesleyville, Ontario
- Coordinates: 43°55′28.58″N 78°23′46.34″W
- Status: Proposed
- Owner: Ontario Power Generation

New Nuclear at Wesleyville is a proposed nuclear power plant on the north shore of Lake Ontario in Wesleyville, Ontario, Canada.

Operated by Ontario Power Generation (OPG), the plant is expected to be the world's largest nuclear power plant, producing 10,000 megawatts of electricity.

== Site selection ==
Following World War II, the hamlet of Wesleyville was identified as a location to build a 1,200-acre (490 ha) multi-million-dollar oil-fired power plant. Throughout the 1960s, Ontario Hydro (now OPG) purchased and demolished most of the homes in the settlement. At the onset of the 1979 oil crisis—when oil supplies decreased and prices increased—construction on the plant was permanently halted. OPG has continued to maintain the property, on which New Nuclear at Wesleyville will be built.

This site was selected because it is located near roads, railways, existing transmission lines, and is already zoned for new electricity generation. Cooling water can be extracted from Lake Ontario, and the site is adjacent to what OPG calls a "clean energy corridor," which includes Pickering Nuclear Generating Station and Darlington Nuclear Generating Station.

== Operation ==
Site preparation is expected to begin by 2030, and the plant is scheduled to be commissioned for operation in 2040. Decommissioning is expected to begin in 2110, with the lifespan of the plant estimated at 78 years.

The plant is expected to create 1,700 jobs.
