= Green Party of Ontario candidates in the 2011 Ontario provincial election =

The Green Party of Ontario is a political party in Ontario, Canada that ran a full slate of candidates in the 2011 Ontario provincial election. This was the second time the party ran a full slate of candidates, after 2007. The party received eight per cent of the popular vote in the 2007 election and three percent in the 2011 election.

Riding	Candidate's Name	Notes	Residence	Occupation	Votes	%	Rank
Ajax—Pickering	Steven Toman				843		
Algoma—Manitoulin	Justin Tilson				684		
Ancaster—Dundas—Flamborough—Westdale	Erik Coverdale				1,477		
Barrie	Andrew Miller				1,909		
Beaches—East York	Shawn Ali				1,025		
Bramalea—Gore—Malton	Pauline Thornham				1,091		
Brampton—Springdale	James Duncan				900		
Brampton West	Patti Chmelyk				1,432		
Brant	Ken Burns				957		
Bruce—Grey—Owen Sound	Don Marshall				2,654		
Burlington	Alex Brown				1,129		
Cambridge	Jacques Malette				1,056		
Carleton—Mississippi Mills	Scott Simser				1,857		
Chatham-Kent—Essex	Holly Sullivan				1,027		
Davenport	Frank de Jong	Former party leader to 2009.		Teacher	855		
Don Valley East	Aren Bedrosyan				702		
Don Valley West	Louis Fliss				718		
Dufferin—Caledon	Rob Strang	Deputy Leader. Shadow Cabinet Critic - Economic Development and Trade, Finance and Revenue.			5,540		
Durham	Edward Yaghledjian				1,221		
Eglinton—Lawrence	Josh Rachlis	Shadow Cabinet Critic - Consumer Services			575		
Elgin—Middlesex—London	Eric Loewen				981		
Essex	Jason Matyi	Shadow Cabinet Critic - Community Safety and Correctional Services			860		
Etobicoke Centre	Cheryll San Juan				837		
Etobicoke—Lakeshore	Angela Salewsky	Shadow Cabinet Critic - Intergovernmental Affairs			1,164		
Etobicoke North	Gurleen Gill	Shadow Cabinet Critic - Seniors Secretariat			541		
Glengarry—Prescott—Russell	Taylor Howarth	Shadow Cabinet Critic - Environment			770		
Guelph	Steven Dyck	Shadow Cabinet Critic - Energy			3,234		
Haldimand—Norfolk	Justin Blake				868		
Haliburton—Kawartha Lakes—Brock	Anita Payne				1,562		
Halton	Karen Fraser				1,286		
Hamilton Centre	Peter Ormond				1,249		
Hamilton East—Stoney Creek	Peter Randall				692		
Hamilton Mountain	Tony Morris				748		
Huron—Bruce	Patrick Main				772		
Kenora—Rainy River	JoJo Holiday				391		
Kingston and the Islands	Robert Kiley				1,594		
Kitchener Centre	Mark Vercouteren				938		
Kitchener—Conestoga	Robert Rose				1,121		
Kitchener—Waterloo	J.D. McGuire				1,308		
Lambton—Kent—Middlesex	James Armstrong				987		
Lanark—Frontenac—Lennox and Addington	Nancy Matte	Shadow Cabinet Critic - Francophone Affairs			1,754		
Leeds—Grenville	Charlie Taylor				1,319		
London—Fanshawe	Bassam Lazar				852		
London North Centre	Kevin Labonte	Shadow Cabinet Critic - Labour			1,451		
London West	Gary Brown				1,194		
Markham—Unionville	Myles O'Brien				1,104		
Mississauga—Brampton South	Keith Foster				1,247		
Mississauga East—Cooksville	Lloyd Jones				934		
Mississauga—Erindale	Otto Casanova				853		
Mississauga South	Cory Mogk				860		
Mississauga—Streetsville	Scott Warner				1,329		
Nepean—Carleton	Gordon Kubanek				1,641		
Newmarket—Aurora	Kristopher Kuysten				1,256		
Niagara Falls	Byrne Smith				759		
Niagara West—Glanbrook	Meredith Cross				1,372		
Nickel Belt	Stephanie-Lynn Russell				810		
Nipissing	Scott Haig				971		
Northumberland—Quinte West	Judy Smith Torrie	Deputy Leader. Shadow Cabinet Critic - Environment, Health and Long-Term Care and Health Promotion and Sport.			1,483		
Oak Ridges—Markham	Trifon Haitas				1,569		
Oakville	Andrew Chlobowski				878		
Oshawa	Stacey Leadbetter				1,035		
Ottawa Centre	Kevin O'Donnell	Shadow Cabinet Critic - Infrastructure and Municipal Affairs.			2,184		
Ottawa—Orléans	Tanya Gutmanis				886		
Ottawa South	James Mihaychuk				1,442		
Ottawa Vanier	Dave Bagler	Shadow Cabinet Critic - Community and Social Services and Training, Colleges and Universities.			1,719		
Ottawa West—Nepean	Alex Hill				1,485		
Oxford	Catherine Stewart Mott				1,336		
Parkdale—High Park	Justin Trottier				1,325		
Parry Sound—Muskoka	Matt Richter	Shadow Cabinet Critic - Education, Tourism & Culture,			3,251		
Perth—Wellington	Chris Desjardins				918		
Peterborough	Gary Beamish				1,235		
Pickering—Scarborough East	Kevin Smith				1,096		
Prince Edward—Hastings	Treat Hull	Shadow Cabinet Critic - Energy, Research and Innovation.			2,049		
Renfrew—Nipissing—Pembroke	Kyle Jones				574		
Richmond Hill	Brian Chamberlain				1,268		
St. Catharines	Jennifer Mooradian	Shadow Cabinet Critic - Children and Youth Services			1,066		
St. Paul's	Judith Van Veldhuysen	Shadow Cabinet Critic - Infrastructure and Women's Directorate			1,180		
Sarnia—Lambton	Jason Vermette				567		
Sault Ste. Marie	Luke Macmichael				519		
Scarborough—Agincourt	Pauline Thompson	Shadow Cabinet Critic – Government Services			722		
Scarborough Centre	Jeff Mole				558		
Scarborough—Guildwood	Naoshad Pochkhanawala				413		
Scarborough—Rouge River	George Singh				455		
Scarborough Southwest	Robin McKim				777		
Simcoe—Grey	Mike Schreiner	Party leader since 2009. Shadow Cabinet Critic - Premier’s Office and the Ministry of Agriculture, Food and Rural Affairs.			4,057		
Simcoe North	Peter Stubbins				2,488		
Stormont—Dundas—South Glengarry	Justin Reist				551		
Sudbury	Pat Rogerson	Shadow Cabinet Critic - Northern Development and Mines			870		
Thornhill	Stephanie Duncan Sonetta Duncan		Aurora, Ontario	filmmaker	756		
Thunder Bay—Atikokan	Jonathan Milnes				379		
Thunder Bay—Superior North	Scot Kyle				555		
Timiskaming—Cochrane	Tina Danese				312		
Timmins—James Bay	Angela Plant				233		
Toronto Centre	Mark Daye	Shadow Cabinet Critic – Community and Social Services; blogger	Toronto	Environmental activist	1,123		
Toronto—Danforth	Tim Whalley				1,354		
Trinity—Spadina	Tim Grant	Shadow Cabinet Critic - Transportation			2,415		
Vaughan	Brendan Frye				694		
Welland	Donna Cridland				1,005		
Wellington—Halton Hills	Raymond Dartsch				1,309		
Whitby—Oshawa	Bradley Gibson				1,139		
Willowdale	Michael Vettese				874		
Windsor—Tecumseh	Justin Levesque				830		
Windsor West	Chad Durocher				1,051		
York Centre	Yuriy Shevyryov				535		
York—Simcoe	Meade Helman	Shadow Cabinet Critic - Agriculture, Food and Rural Affairs			1,479		
York South—Weston	Keith Jarrett				474		
York West	Joseph Rini				287		
