= Bay of Quinte (provincial electoral district) =

Provincial electoral district in Ontario, Canada

Coordinates: 44.079°N 77.295°W

Ontario electoral district
- Bay of Quinte in relation to other electoral districts in Southern Ontario

Provincial electoral district
- Legislature: Legislative Assembly of Ontario
MPP
Tyler Allsopp
Progressive Conservative
- District created: 2015
- First contested: 2018
- Last contested: 2025

Demographics
- Population (2021): 116,016
- Electors (2018): 90,324
- Area (km²): 3,007
- Pop. density (per km²): 38.6
- Census division(s): Hastings, Prince Edward
- Census subdivision(s): Belleville, Prince Edward, Quinte West

Bay of Quinte is a provincial electoral district in Ontario, Canada, centred on the Bay of Quinte area. It elects one member to the Legislative Assembly of Ontario. This riding was created in 2015.

== Members of Provincial Parliament ==
Bay of Quinte
Assembly	Years	Member	Party
Riding created from Northumberland—Quinte West and Prince Edward—Hastings
42nd	2018–2022	Todd Smith	Progressive Conservative
43rd	2022–2024	Todd Smith	Progressive Conservative
43rd	2024–2025	Tyler Allsopp	Progressive Conservative
44th	2025–present	Tyler Allsopp	Progressive Conservative

== Election results ==
Winning party in each polling division of Bay of Quinte at the 2025 Ontario general election

2025 Ontario general election
Party	Candidate	Votes	%	±%	Expenditures
Progressive Conservative	Tyler Allsopp	20,606	44.14	+5.45	$128,500
Liberal	David O'Neill	14,652	31.38	–1.94	$31,613
New Democratic	Amanda Robertson	8,793	18.83	–4.24	$41,013
Green	Lori Borthwick	1,618	3.47	+0.29	$13,921
New Blue	Anthony Zambito	518	1.11	+0.12	$0
Ontario Party	Nick Maddison	501	1.07	–	–
Total valid votes/expense limit		46,688	99.27	–	$156,936
Total rejected, unmarked and declined ballots		342	0.73	+0.22	
Turnout		47,030	48.25	+10.22	
Eligible voters		97,476			
Progressive Conservative hold		Swing		▲3.69	
Source: Elections Ontario

Ontario provincial by-election, September 19, 2024 Resignation of Todd Smith
Party	Candidate	Votes	%	±%	Expenditures
Progressive Conservative	Tyler Allsopp	14,430	38.69	–10.61	$140,699
Liberal	Sean Kelly	12,428	33.32	+14.87	$105,603
New Democratic	Amanda Robertson	8,606	23.07	+2.15	$106,045
Green	Lori Borthwick	1,186	3.18	–3.09	$15,616
New Blue	Margaret Schuler	369	0.99	–1.61	$0
Independent	John Turmel	149	0.40	–	$0
Libertarian	Mark Snow	129	0.35	–	$0
Total valid votes/expense limit		37,297	99.49	–	$156,936
Total rejected, unmarked and declined ballots		190	0.51	+0.10	
Turnout		37,487	38.02	–7.89	
Eligible voters		98,590			
Progressive Conservative hold		Swing		–12.74	
Source: Elections Ontario

Winning party in each polling division of Bay of Quinte at the 2022 Ontario general election

2022 Ontario general election
Party	Candidate	Votes	%	±%	Expenditures
Progressive Conservative	Todd Smith	21,381	49.30	+1.28	$76,706
New Democratic	Alison Kelly	9,073	20.92	–10.92	$55,474
Liberal	Emilie Leneveu	8,003	18.45	+3.56	$31,230
Green	Erica Charlton	2,719	6.27	+2.84	$0
New Blue	Rob Collins	1,128	2.60	–	$5,066
Ontario Party	Noah Wales	1,062	2.45	–	$3,779
Total valid votes/expense limit		43,366	99.59	–	$133,230
Total rejected, unmarked and declined ballots		179	0.41	–0.68	
Turnout		43,545	45.91	–10.55	
Eligible voters		94,852			
Progressive Conservative hold		Swing		▲6.10	
Source: Elections Ontario

2018 Ontario general election
Party	Candidate	Votes	%
Progressive Conservative	Todd Smith	24,224	48.02
New Democratic	Joanne Belanger	16,063	31.84
Liberal	Robert Quaiff	7,511	14.89
Green	Mark Daye	1,730	3.43
Libertarian	Cindy Davidson	396	0.79
Independent	Paul Bordonaro	379	0.75
Trillium	James Engelsman	139	0.28
Total valid votes		50,442	98.91
Total rejected, unmarked and declined ballots		554	1.09
Turnout		50,996	56.46
Eligible voters		90,324	
Progressive Conservative pickup new district.			
Source: Elections Ontario

^ Results are compared to redistributed results

2014 general election redistributed results
Party	Vote	%
Progressive Conservative	16,828	39.00
Liberal	16,481	38.20
New Democratic	7,359	17.06
Green	2,126	4.93
Libertarian	354	0.82

== See also ==
- List of Ontario provincial electoral districts
- Canadian provincial electoral districts
