= Wesleyville, Ontario =

Wesleyville
- Dispersed rural community
- Wesleyville United Church Lakeshore Road in Wesleyville

- Location within Southern Ontario
- Coordinates: 43°55′29″N 78°25′06″W
- Country: Canada
- Province: Ontario
- County: Northumberland
- Municipality: Port Hope
- Named for: John Wesley
- Time zone: UTC-5 (Eastern (EST))
  - Summer (DST): UTC-4 (EDT)
- GNBC Code: FDCCS

Wesleyville is a dispersed rural community in Port Hope, Northumberland County, Ontario, Canada.

== History ==
The Wesleyville area became accessible in the early 1800s when a road was built between Toronto and nearby Port Hope.

The area was used for farming until 1847, when John Barrowcloughs built the first home.

By 1845, a Methodist church had been built, and both the church—Wesley Church—and the settlement were named for John Wesley.

A log school had been built by 1845, and a new school was built in 1866. The school was destroyed by fire, and was replaced by a brick school that served the community until 1967.

In the early 1860s, Wesleyville contained a post office, machine shop, cobbler, barrel manufacturer, and blacksmith. The settlement also had a tavern operated by Tom Clark from 1861 until 1864, when Clark "got religion and dumped his liquor on the road".

Following World War II, Wesleyville was identified as a potential location for a 1,200-acre (490 ha) oil-fired power plant, and by the 1960s, Ontario Hydro was purchasing and demolishing homes in Wesleyville. By the end of the 1960s, Wesleyville was nearly abandoned, and with the onset of the 1979 oil crisis, construction on the power plant was permanently halted.

In 2010, a 20-year contract was negotiated between the Friends of Wesleyville Village and the United Church of Canada, in order to restore the 1860 Wesleyville United Church and cemetery, one of the few extant structures in the settlement.

In 2026, Ontario Power Generation announced plans to build a 10,000 megawatt nuclear generating station—the world’s largest nuclear power plant—on the site of the abandoned oil-fired plant in Wesleyville. Construction is scheduled to begin in 2033, and the plant—New Nuclear at Wesleyville—should be operational by 2040.
