= Progressive Conservative Party of Ontario candidates in the 2011 Ontario provincial election =

The Progressive Conservative Party of Ontario is a political party in Ontario, Canada which ran a full slate of candidates in the 2011 Ontario provincial election.

Riding	Candidate's Name	Notes	Residence	Occupation	Votes	%	Rank
Ajax—Pickering	Todd McCarthy				14,718	35.39	2
Algoma—Manitoulin	Joe Chapman				6,141	23.48	3
Ancaster—Dundas—Flamborough—Westdale	Donna Skelly			Journalist for CHCH-TV.	17,132	34.45	2
Barrie	Rod Jackson				17,527	40.49	1
Beaches—East York	Chris Menary				5,333	13.87	3
Bramalea—Gore—Malton	Sanjeev Maingi				9,896	22.55	3
Brampton—Springdale	Pam Hundal				12,754	35.93	3
Brampton West	Ben Shenouda				14,434	32.66	2
Brant	Michael St. Amant				15,761	34.5	2
Bruce—Grey—Owen Sound	Bill Walker				19,567	47.18	1
Burlington	Jane McKenna			20,061	40.22	1	
Cambridge	Rob Leone				15,947	37.53	1
Carleton—Mississippi Mills	Jack MacLaren			28,246	50.29	1	
Chatham-Kent—Essex	Rick Nicholls				15,121	41.51	1
Davenport	Kirk Russell				2,480	7.88	3
Don Valley East	Michael Lende				8,705	27.05	2
Don Valley West	Andrea Mandel-Campbell				12,827	30.52	2
Dufferin—Caledon	Sylvia Jones	Incumbent MPP.			17,833	46.74	1
Durham	John O'Toole	Incumbent MPP.			22,393	48.89	1
Eglinton—Lawrence	Rocco Rossi				12,857	33.49	2
Elgin—Middlesex—London	Jeff Yurek				19,771	47.68	1
Essex	Dave Brister				16,049	34.88	2
Etobicoke Centre	Mary Anne De Monte-Whalen				13,956	32.58	2
Etobicoke—Lakeshore	Simon Nyilassi				12,705	29.07	2
Etobicoke North	Karm Singh				6,072	24.21	2
Glengarry—Prescott—Russell	Marilissa Gosselin				15,973	39.5	2
Guelph	Greg Schirk				11,954	25.49	
Haldimand—Norfolk	Toby Barrett	Incumbent MPP.			25,203	60.59	1
Haliburton—Kawartha Lakes—Brock	Laurie Scott	Former MPP.		22,352	45.26	1	
Halton	Ted Chudleigh	Incumbent MPP.			26,228	44.33	1
Hamilton Centre	Don Sheppard				4,421	13.1	3
Hamilton East—Stoney Creek	Nancy Fiorentino				7,395	18.61	3
Hamilton Mountain	Geordie Elms				8,641	18.96	3
Huron—Bruce	Lisa Thompson				19,138	42.6	1
Kenora—Rainy River	Rod McKay				8,307	37.54	2
Kingston and the Islands	Rodger James				9,610	22.24	3
Kitchener Centre	Dave MacDonald				15,069	38.24	2
Kitchener—Conestoga	Michael Harris				18,017	43.92	1
Kitchener—Waterloo	Elizabeth Witmer	Resigned April 27, 2012.			21,665	43.62	1
Lambton—Kent—Middlesex	Monte McNaughton				19,379	45.55	1
Lanark—Frontenac—Lennox and Addington	Randy Hillier	Incumbent MPP.			22,457	49.95	1
Leeds—Grenville	Steve Clark	Incumbent MPP.			24,314	63.34	1
London—Fanshawe	Cheryl Miller				9,075	26.35	3
London North Centre	Nancy Branscombe				12,628	28.79	2
London West	Ali Chahbar				14,603	29.35	2
Markham—Unionville	Shan Thayaparan						
Mississauga—Brampton South	Amarjeet Gill						
Mississauga East—Cooksville	Zoran Churchin						
Mississauga—Erindale	David Brown						
Mississauga South	Geoff Janoscik						
Mississauga—Streetsville	Wafik Sunbaty						
Nepean—Carleton	Lisa MacLeod	Incumbent MPP.					
Newmarket—Aurora	Frank Klees	Incumbent MPP.					
Niagara Falls	George Lepp						
Niagara West—Glanbrook	Tim Hudak	Incumbent MPP; party leader.					
Nickel Belt	Paula Peroni						
Nipissing	Vic Fedeli	Former mayor of North Bay.					
Northumberland—Quinte West	Rob Milligan						
Oak Ridges—Markham	Farid Wassef						
Oakville	Larry Scott						
Oshawa	Jerry Ouellette	Incumbent MPP.					
Ottawa Centre	Rob Dekker						
Ottawa—Orléans	Andrew Lister						
Ottawa South	Jason MacDonald						
Ottawa Vanier	Fred Sherman						
Ottawa West—Nepean	Randall Denley			Columnist for the Ottawa Citizen.			
Oxford	Ernie Hardeman	Incumbent MPP.					
Parkdale—High Park	Joe Ganetakos						
Parry Sound—Muskoka	Norm Miller	Incumbent MPP.					
Perth—Wellington	Randy Pettapiece						
Peterborough	Alan Wilson						
Pickering—Scarborough East	Kevin Gaudet						
Prince Edward—Hastings	Todd Smith						
Renfrew—Nipissing—Pembroke	John Yakabuski	Incumbent MPP.					
Richmond Hill	Vic Gupta						
St. Catharines	Sandie Bellows						
St. Paul's	Christine McGirr						
Sarnia—Lambton	Bob Bailey						
Sault Ste. Marie	Jib Turner						
Scarborough—Agincourt	Liang Chen						
Scarborough Centre	Carol Williams						
Scarborough—Guildwood	Gary Ellis						
Scarborough—Rouge River	Ken Kim						
Scarborough Southwest	Mike Chopowick						
Simcoe—Grey	Jim Wilson	Incumbent MPP.					
Simcoe North	Garfield Dunlop	Incumbent MPP.					
Stormont—Dundas—South Glengarry	Jim McDonell						
Sudbury	Gerry Labelle						
Thornhill	Peter Shurman	Incumbent MPP.					
Thunder Bay—Atikokan	Fred Gilbert						
Thunder Bay—Superior North	Anthony LeBlanc						
Timiskaming—Cochrane	Randy Aulbrook						
Timmins—James Bay	Alan Spacek	Mayor of Kapuskasing.					
Toronto Centre	Martin Abell						
Toronto—Danforth	Rita Jethi						
Trinity—Spadina	Mike Yen						
Vaughan	Tony Genco						
Welland	Domenic Ursini						
Wellington—Halton Hills	Ted Arnott	Incumbent MPP.					
Whitby—Oshawa	Christine Elliott	Incumbent MPP.					
Willowdale	Vince Agovino						
Windsor—Tecumseh	Robert de Verteuil						
Windsor West	Todd Branch						
York Centre	Michael Mostyn						
York—Simcoe	Julia Munro	Incumbent MPP.					
York South—Weston	Lan Daniel						
York West	Karlene Nation			Journalist for CFTO-TV.			

== By-elections ==
Riding	Candidate's Name	Notes	Residence	Occupation	Votes	%	Rank
Vaughan	Tony Genco	By-election on September 6, 2012, due to the resignation of Greg Sorbara.			10,674	33.29	2
Kitchener—Waterloo	Tracey Weiler	By-election on September 6, 2012, due to the resignation of Elizabeth Witmer.		Business consultant, Wilfrid Laurier University instructor	14,851	31.83	2
London West	Ali Chahbar	By-election on August 1, 2013, due to the resignation of Chris Bentley.			12,122	32.74	2
Windsor—Tecumseh	Robert de Verteuil	By-election on August 1, 2013, due to the resignation of Dwight Duncan.			5,149	20.12	2
Ottawa South	Matt Young	By-election on August 1, 2013, due to the resignation of Dalton McGuinty.			13,631	38.67	2
Etobicoke—Lakeshore	Doug Holyday	By-election on August 1, 2013, due to the resignation of Laurel Broten.		Toronto City Councillor	16,130	46.64	1
Scarborough—Guildwood	Ken Kirupa	By-election on August 1, 2013, due to the resignation of Margarett Best.			7,606	30.79	2
Niagara Falls	Bart Maves	By-election on February 13, 2014, due to the resignation of Kim Craitor.		Niagara Region councillor, former MPP.	13,564	36.83	2
Thornhill	Gila Martow	By-election on February 13, 2014, due to the resignation of Peter Shurman.		optometrist	13,397	47.96	1
