= Ontario New Democratic Party candidates in the 2011 Ontario provincial election =

This is a list of candidates for the Ontario New Democratic Party in the 2011 Ontario general election. The ONDP nominated candidates in all of Ontario's 107 ridings, 17 of whom were elected. Following the election, the ONDP remained the third largest party in the Legislative Assembly of Ontario.

== Central Ontario ==
Riding	Candidate's Name	Notes	Residence	Occupation	Votes	%	Rank
Barrie	Myrna Clark		Barrie		8,168	18.96	3rd
Dufferin—Caledon	Karen Gventer		Hepworth		4,200	11.06	4th
Durham	James Terry		Courtice	Factory worker	8,027	17.59	3rd
Haliburton—Kawartha Lakes—Brock	Donald Abel	Member of Provincial Parliament for Wentworth North (1990–1995)	Kawartha Lakes	Civil servant	8,517	17.31	3rd
Newmarket—Aurora	Robin Wardlaw		Newmarket	United Church minister	6,514	14.36	3rd
Northumberland—Quinte West	Kira Mees		Hastings	Disability support worker	8,589	17.73	3rd
Peterborough	Dave Nickle	ONDP candidate for Peterborough in the 2007, 2003, and 1999 provincial elections			12,460	25.61	3rd
Simcoe—Grey	David Matthews				6,839	14.66	3rd
Simcoe North	Doris Middleton				7,710	16.96	3rd
York—Simcoe	Megan Tay		Bond Head		6,607	17.07	3rd

== Eastern Ontario/Ottawa ==
Riding	Candidate's Name	Notes	Residence	Occupation	Votes	%	Rank
Carleton—Mississippi Mills	Liam Duff			University student	6,371	11.31	3rd
Glengarry—Prescott—Russell	Bonnie Jean-Louis	Green Party candidate for Glengarry—Prescott—Russell in the 2006 federal election	Hawkesbury		5,721	14.24	3rd
Kingston and the Islands	Mary Rita Holland				10,241	23.79	2nd
Lanark—Frontenac—Lennox and Addington	Dave Parkhill		Kingston	Paramedic	8,104	18.09	3rd
Leeds—Grenville	David Lundy		Merrickville	Union leader (OPSEU)	5,822	15.23	3rd
Nepean—Carleton	Ric Dagenais	ONDP candidate for Ottawa–Vanier in the 2007 provincial election		Union official (CUPE)	8,127	14.77	3rd
Ottawa Centre	Anil Naidoo		Ottawa	Human rights consultant	14,715	29.13	2nd
Ottawa—Orléans	Doug McKercher		Ottawa	Civil servant/Teacher	4,979	10.58	3rd
Ottawa South	Wali Farah		Ottawa	Immigrant support services director	5,988	13.39	3rd
Ottawa Vanier	Paul Étienne Laliberté-Tipple			Professor	7,466	19.60	3rd
Ottawa West—Nepean	Wendy Byrne	Ottawa-Carleton Regional Councillor for Bay Ward (1998–2001)		Lawyer	6,576	14.80	3rd
Prince Edward—Hastings	Sherry Hayes		MacArthur's Mills	Non-profit executive	7,379	16.58	3rd
Renfrew—Nipissing—Pembroke	Brian Dougherty		Arnprior	Plumber	4,277	10.97	3rd
Stormont—Dundas—South Glengarry	Elaine MacDonald	Member of Cornwall City Council (2010–present)	Cornwall	Teacher	8,021	20.65	3rd

== Greater Toronto Area ==
Riding	Candidate's Name	Notes	Residence	Occupation	Votes	%	Rank
Ajax—Pickering	Evan Wiseman				5,951	14.37	3rd
Beaches—East York	Michael Prue	Member of Provincial Parliament for Beaches—East York (2001–2014); Candidate in the 2009 Ontario NDP leadership election Member of Toronto City Council for Ward 32 (Beaches—East York) (1998–2001); Mayor of East York (1993–1997)		Civil servant	17,807	46.61	1st
Bramalea—Gore—Malton	Jagmeet Singh	NDP candidate for Bramalea—Gore—Malton in the 2011 federal election		Lawyer	16,318	37.64	1st
Brampton—Springdale	Mani Singh	ONDP candidate for Brampton—Springdale in the 2007 provincial election			5,378	15.25	3rd
Brampton West	Dalbir Kathuria		Brampton	Small business owner	8,337	18.97	3rd
Burlington	Peggy Russell	Halton District School Board Trustee (2000–2010)	Burlington		9,370	18.87	3rd
Davenport	Jonah Schein	Candidate for Ward 17 - Davenport in the 2010 Toronto municipal election	Davenport	Social worker	14,367	45.93	1st
Don Valley East	Bob Hilliard	Former President of the Canadian Paediatric Society	Toronto	Paediatrician/professor at the University of Toronto	5,953	18.61	3rd
Don Valley West	Khalid Ahmed			Social worker	3,621	8.64	3rd
Eglinton—Lawrence	Gerti Dervishi				3,763	9.82	3rd
Etobicoke Centre	Ana Maria Rivero	NDP candidate for Etobicoke Centre in the 2011 federal election NDP candidate for Etobicoke North in the 2000 federal election	Etobicoke		5,099	11.98	3rd
Etobicoke—Lakeshore	Dionne Coley			Lawyer/professor at Humber College and Seneca College	6,713	15.45	3rd
Etobicoke North	Vrind Sharma			Charity coordinator	5,426	21.76	3rd
Halton	Nik Spohr			University student	7,757	13.15	3rd
Markham—Unionville	P.C. Choo				4,575	12.29	3rd
Mississauga—Brampton South	Karanjit Pandher	ONDP candidate for Mississauga—Brampton South in the 2007 provincial election			5,420	16.02	3rd
Mississauga East—Cooksville	Waseem Ahmed	NDP candidate for Mississauga East—Cooksville in the 2011 federal election	Mississauga	Small business owner	5,704	16.79	3rd
Mississauga—Erindale	Michelle Bilek				7,768	17.02	3rd
Mississauga South	Anju Sikka				4,044	10.06	3rd
Mississauga—Streetsville	Raed Ayad				5,494	15.23	3rd
Oak Ridges—Markham	Joe Whitfield				8,548	13.26	3rd
Oakville	Lesley Sprague				4,625	10.24	3rd
Oshawa	Mike Shields				14,316	36.18	2nd
Parkdale—High Park	Cheri DiNovo	Member of Provincial Parliament for Parkdale—High Park (2006–2017)	Toronto	United Church minister	18,365	46.20	1st
Pickering—Scarborough East	Nerissa Cariño				6,424	16.47	3rd
Richmond Hill	Adam De Vita				4,987	12.97	3rd
St. Paul's	David Hynes				7,124	16.61	3rd
Scarborough—Agincourt	Paul Choi				5,017	15.77	3rd
Scarborough Centre	Kathleen Mathurin	ONDP candidate for Scarborough Centre in the 2007 provincial election			6,876	22.01	3rd
Scarborough—Guildwood	Lorri Urban				6,194	19.42	3rd
Scarborough—Rouge River	Neethan Shan	York Region District School Board Trustee for Wards 7 and 8 (2006–2010)	Scarborough	Social worker	13,088	35.97	2nd
Scarborough Southwest	Bruce Budd				10,404	31.45	2nd
Thornhill	Cindy Hackelberg				4,024	8.96	3rd
Toronto Centre	Cathy Crowe			Nurse	11,571	25.19	2nd
Toronto—Danforth	Peter Tabuns	Member of Provincial Parliament for Toronto—Danforth (2006–present)			20,062	54.01	1st
Trinity—Spadina	Rosario Marchese	Member of Provincial Parliament for Trinity—Spadina (1999–2014); Member of Provincial Parliament for Fort York (1990–1999)			19,870	42.36	1st
Vaughan	Paul Donofrio				5,594	11.33	3rd
Whitby—Oshawa	Maret Sadem-Thompson				7,865	15.46	3rd
Willowdale	Alexander Brown				5,556	12.85	3rd
York Centre	John Fagan				4,579	14.13	3rd
York South—Weston	Paul Ferreira	Member of Provincial Parliament for York South—Weston (2007)			13,071	42.18	2nd
York West	Tom Rakocevic			Executive assistant	7,901	34.82	2nd

== Hamilton/Niagara ==
Riding	Candidate's Name	Notes	Residence	Occupation	Votes	%	Rank
Ancaster—Dundas—Flamborough—Westdale	Trevor Westerhoff			Small business owner	8,154	17.20	3rd
Hamilton Centre	Andrea Horwath	Leader of the Ontario New Democratic Party (2009–2022); Member of Provincial Parliament for Hamilton Centre (2007–2022); Member of Provincial Parliament for Hamilton East (2004–2007); Member of Hamilton City Council for Ward 2 (1997–2004)	Hamilton		20,586	61.33	1st
Hamilton East—Stoney Creek	Paul Miller	Member of Provincial Parliament for Hamilton East—Stoney Creek (2007–2022); Member of Stoney Creek City Council (1994–2000)	Stoney Creek		20,442	51.72	1st
Hamilton Mountain	Monique Taylor		Hamilton	Executive assistant	20,492	45.16	1st
Niagara Falls	Wayne Redekop	Mayor of Fort Erie (1997–2006)	Fort Erie		12,304	26.30	3rd
Niagara West—Glanbrook	Anthony Marco			Teacher	9,070	18.55	3rd
St. Catharines	Irene Lowell		St. Catharines	Factory worker	8,624	20.20	3rd
Welland	Cindy Forster	Mayor of Welland (2000–2003)	Welland	Nurse	19,527	44.66	1st

== Northern Ontario ==
Riding	Candidate's Name	Notes	Residence	Occupation	Votes	%	Rank
Algoma—Manitoulin	Michael Mantha		Elliot Lake	Executive assistant	11,560	44.45	1st
Kenora—Rainy River	Sarah Campbell		Vermilion Bay	Executive assistant	10,752	49.62	1st
Nickel Belt	France Gélinas	Member of Provincial Parliament for Nickel Belt (2007–present)	Naughton		16,876	54.89	1st
Nipissing	Henri Giroux	ONDP candidate for Nipissing in the 2007 provincial election		Chef	5,567	18.14	3rd
Parry Sound—Muskoka	Alex Zyganiuk				6,526	18.18	3rd
Sault Ste. Marie	Celia Ross	President of Algoma University (1998–2010)	Sault Ste. Marie	University professor	9,047	30.87	2nd
Sudbury	Paul Loewenberg		Sudbury	Arts promoter	13,251	40.72	2nd
Thunder Bay—Atikokan	Mary Kozorys				9,874	37.29	2nd
Thunder Bay—Superior North	Steve Mantis		Thunder Bay		9,111	34.85	2nd
Timiskaming—Cochrane	John Vanthof	ONDP candidate for Timiskaming—Cochrane in the 2011 provincial election	Earlton	Farmer	9,735	42.74	1st
Timmins—James Bay	Gilles Bisson	Member of Provincial Parliament for Timmins—James Bay (1999–2018); Member of Provincial Parliament for Cochrane South (1990–1999)	Timmins	Union leader	11,479	49.47	1st

== Southwestern Ontario ==
Riding	Candidate's Name	Notes	Residence	Occupation	Votes	%	Rank
Brant	Brian Van Tilborg	ONDP candidate for Brant in the 2007 provincial election			11,006	24.20	3rd
Bruce—Grey—Owen Sound	Paul Johnstone	ONDP candidate for Bruce—Grey—Owen Sound in the 2007 provincial election			6,133	14.85	3rd
Cambridge	Atinuke Bankole		Cambridge	Teacher	10,414	24.61	3rd
Elgin—Middlesex—London	Kathy Cornish			Union official (SEIU)	9,201	22.27	3rd
Essex	Taras Natyshak		Belle River	Union official (LIUNA)	17,417	37.99	1st
Guelph	James Gordon		Guelph	Musician	11,150	23.88	3rd
Haldimand—Norfolk	Ian Nichols				8,048	19.42	2nd
Huron—Bruce	Grant Robertson				9,329	20.85	3rd
Kitchener Centre	Cameron Dearlove				7,385	18.82	3rd
Kitchener—Conestoga	Mark Cairns	ONDP candidate for Kitchener—Conestoga in the 2007 provincial election			7,165	17.57	3rd
Kitchener—Waterloo	Isabel Cisterna				8,250	16.67	3rd
Lambton—Kent—Middlesex	Joe Hill				8,882	20.96	3rd
London—Fanshawe	Teresa Armstrong		London	Insurance professional	13,953	40.77	1st
London North Centre	Steve Holmes	ONDP candidate for London North Centre in the 2007 provincial election			9,914	22.71	3rd
London West	Jeff Buchanan				10,757	21.72	3rd
Oxford	Dorothy Marie Eisen				5,885	15.63	3rd
Perth—Wellington	Ellen Papenburg		Drayton	Small business owner	5,836	15.76	3rd
Sarnia—Lambton	Brian White				10,307	25.45	2nd
Wellington—Halton Hills	Dale Hamilton	Former Member of Eramosa Town Council	Eramosa		6,106	14.45	3rd
Windsor—Tecumseh	Andrew McAvoy	Green Party of Ontario candidate for Windsor—Tecumseh in the 2007 provincial election			12,228	32.84	2nd
Windsor West	Helmi Charif	ONDP candidate for Windsor—Tecumseh in the 2007 provincial election	Windsor		10,544	30.83	2nd

== By-elections ==
Riding	Candidate's Name	Notes	Residence	Occupation	Votes	%	Rank
Vaughan	Paul Donofrio	By-election on September 6, 2012, due to the resignation of Greg Sorbara.			3,647	11.38	3
Kitchener—Waterloo	Catherine Fife	By-election on September 6, 2012, due to the resignation of Elizabeth Witmer.			18,599	39.87	1
London West	Peggy Sattler	By-election on August 1, 2013, due to the resignation of Chris Bentley.			15,503	41.88	1
Windsor—Tecumseh	Percy Hatfield	By-election on August 1, 2013, due to the resignation of Dwight Duncan.			15,693	61.31	1
Ottawa South	Bronwyn Funiciello	By-election on August 1, 2013, due to the resignation of Dalton McGuinty.			5,030	14.27	3
Etobicoke—Lakeshore	P.C. Choo	By-election on August 1, 2013, due to the resignation of Laurel Broten.			2,705	7.82	3
Scarborough—Guildwood	Adam Giambrone	By-election on August 1, 2013, due to the resignation of Margarett Best.			7,010	28.37	3
Niagara Falls	Wayne Gates	By-election on February 13, 2014, due to the resignation of Kim Craitor.		Niagara Falls City Councillor	14,526	39.44	1
Thornhill	Cindy Hackelberg	By-election on February 13, 2014, due to the resignation of Peter Shurman.			1,896	6.79	3
