= 40th Parliament of Ontario =

Parliamentary session of the Ontario Provincial Parliament

- Minority parliament
- Nov. 21, 2011 – May. 2, 2014

Parliament leaders
- Premier: Hon. Dalton McGuinty; October 23, 2003 - February 11, 2013
- Hon. Kathleen Wynne; February 11, 2013 - June 29, 2018
- Cabinet: McGuinty ministry
- Leader of the Opposition: Tim Hudak; July 1, 2009 - July 2, 2014

Party caucuses
- Government: Liberal Party
- Opposition: Progressive Conservative Party
- Recognized: New Democratic Party

Legislative Assembly
- Speaker of the Assembly: Hon. Dave Levac; November 21, 2011 - 2014
- Government House leader: Hon. John Milloy; October 20, 2011 - June 12, 2014
- Opposition House leader: Jim Wilson; October 20, 2011 - July 2, 2014
- Members: 107 MPP seats

Sovereign
- Monarch: Elizabeth II; 6 February 1952 – present

Sessions
- 1st session November 21, 2011 – October 15, 2012
- 2nd session February 19, 2013 – May 2, 2014
← 39th	→ 41st

The 40th Legislative Assembly of Ontario was a legislature of the government of the province of Ontario, Canada. The membership was set by the 2011 Ontario general election.

It was controlled by a Liberal Party minority. The government was led by Premier Dalton McGuinty until his resignation resulted in the 2013 leadership election, which selected Kathleen Wynne as his successor. Wynne is the first woman ever to serve as Premier of Ontario.

The Official Opposition was the Progressive Conservative Party, led by Tim Hudak, and the third party was the New Democrats, led by Andrea Horwath.

On May 2, 2014, Premier of Ontario Kathleen Wynne announced that she had formally requested that Lieutenant Governor of Ontario David Onley dissolve the 40th Legislative Assembly of Ontario and call a provincial general election to occur on June 12, 2014.

== Standing ==
=== Summary of 2011 election results ===
Party	Party leader	Seats				Popular vote		
Party	Party leader	2007	dis.	2011	minus	Votes	%	minus
Liberal	Dalton McGuinty	71	70	53	18▼	1,625,102	37.65%	4.7%▼
Progressive Conservative	Tim Hudak	26	25	37	11▲	1,530,076	35.45%	3.8%▲
New Democratic	Andrea Horwath	10	10	17	7▲	981,508	22.74%	5.9%▲
Vacant			2					
Total		107	107	107		4,316,382	100%	-2.43%

=== Summary of changes in party standing ===
Summary of changes in party standing
Party	2011	Decreases ▼			Increases ▲		2014
Party	Elxn	Rsg	death	Cross	Held	Gain	diss.
Liberal	53	(8)			3		48
Progressive Conservative	37	(2)			1	1	37
New Democratic	17					4	21
Vacant	–	10			(4)	(5)	1
Total	107						107

== Events of the 40th Parliament of Ontario ==
=== Sessions ===
There were two sessions of the 40th Legislature.

Session	Start	End
1st	November 22, 2011	October 15, 2012
2nd	February 19, 2013	May 2, 2014

=== Timeline ===
- November 21, 2011 – Dave Levac (Liberal, Brant) is elected Speaker on the second ballot defeating three other candidates.
- November 22, 2011 – Speech from the Throne is delivered.
- March 29, 2012: Finance Minister Dwight Duncan delivers the provincial budget.
- April 23, 2012: After negotiations between the Liberals and the NDP, the minority government agrees to amend the budget by adding $242 million to child care funding, $20 million for northern and rural hospitals, increase welfare and disability benefits by 1 per cent at a cost of $55 million, and add a 2% surtax on the portion of individual income that exceeds $500,000 a year.
- April 24, 2012: Budget approved 52–37 with NDP MPPs abstaining.
- April 27, 2012: Progressive Conservative MPP Elizabeth Witmer (Kitchener—Waterloo) resigns her seat upon accepting a government appointment as chair of the Workplace Safety & Insurance Board. The vacancy results in the government and Opposition being tied in seats, however, as Speaker David Levac is a Liberal, the Opposition continues to have a one-seat advantage. A Liberal victory in this pending by-election and in the pending Vaughan by-election would give it a majority in the legislature.
- August 1, 2012: Liberal MPP Greg Sorbara (Vaughan) resigns his seat.
- September 6, 2012: By-elections held in the ridings of Kitchener—Waterloo and Vaughan. Catherine Fife (NDP) elected as MPP for Kitchener—Waterloo. Steven Del Duca (Liberal) elected as MPP for Vaughan. The NDP gains one seat in the Ontario Legislature while the Liberals retain their 53-seat minority.
- October 15, 2012: Premier McGuinty prorogues the legislature and announces his resignation as Liberal Party leader pending a leadership convention.
- February 11, 2013: Kathleen Wynne is sworn in as Premier, and a new cabinet in sworn in.
- February 14, 2013: Chris Bentley and Dwight Duncan, Liberal MPPs for London West and Windsor—Tecumseh, resign.
- June 11, 2013: Passage of the Wynne government's first budget, with the support of the NDP; legislature recesses for the summer.
- June 12, 2013: Former Premier Dalton McGuinty resigns his Ottawa South seat.
- June 27, 2013: Liberal MPP Margarett Best (Scarborough—Guildwood) resigns her seat.
- July 2, 2013: Minister of Intergovernmental Affairs Laurel Broten (Etobicoke—Lakeshore) resigns from Cabinet and her seat.
- August 1, 2013: Five by-elections held to replace retiring Liberals. Results were two Liberals, two NDP, one Conservative.
- September 24, 2013: Kim Craitor, Liberal MPP for Niagara Falls, resigns his seat.
- December 31, 2013: Peter Shurman, Progressive Conservative MPP for Thornhill, resigns his seat.
- February 13, 2014: Two by-elections held to replace vacant Niagara Falls and Thornhill seats. Result is a Progressive Conservative hold in Thornhill and an NDP gain in Niagara Falls.
- March 25, 2014: Resignation of cabinet member Linda Jeffrey to run for mayor of Brampton causes a cabinet shuffle.
- May 2, 2014: The 40th Parliament of Ontario was dissolved as Wynne calls an election, to be held June 12, 2014.

== Seating Plan ==
						Martow	MacLaren	Milligan	Pettapiece	Hillier		Hatfield	Sattler	Gates
	Nicholls	Jackson	Smith	Harris	Thompson	Yurek	Scott	McKenna	Walker	Leone	McDonell	Campbell	Vanthof	Schein	Armstrong	Mantha	P. Miller
	Bailey	Ouellette	O'Toole	Clark	Chudleigh	Munro	Jones	Holyday	Dunlop	McNaughton	Barrett	Forster	Fife	Singh	Tabuns	Natyshak	Taylor
		Wilson	Arnott	Hardeman	Fedeli	Elliott	Hudak	Yakabuski	MacLeod	N. Miller	Klees	Bisson	Horwath	DiNovo	Marchese	Gélinas	Prue
Levac
		Milloy	Bradley	Chiarelli	Meilleur	Sousa	Wynne	Matthews	Naqvi	Sandals	Hoskins	MacCharles	Kwinter	Bartolucci	Takhar
		Delaney	Gerretsen	Leal	Mauro	Murray	Piruzza	Chan	McMeekin	Gravelle	Duguid	Dhillon	Cansfield	Colle	Berardinetti
		McNeely	Qaadri	Albanese	Moridi	Orazietti	Coteau	Sergio	Flynn	Zimmer	Balkissoon	Dickson	Jaczek	Mangat
				Crack	Damerla	Wong	Del Duca	Fraser	Hunter							Levac

== List of members ==
Name	Party	Riding	First elected / previously elected	No. of terms	Notes
Joe Dickson	Liberal	Ajax—Pickering	2007	2nd term	
Michael Mantha	New Democrat	Algoma—Manitoulin	2011	1st term	
Ted McMeekin	Liberal	Ancaster—Dundas—Flamborough—Westdale	2000	4th term	
Rod Jackson	Progressive Conservative	Barrie	2011	1st term	
Michael Prue	New Democrat	Beaches—East York	2001	4th term	
Jagmeet Singh	New Democrat	Bramalea—Gore—Malton	2011	1st term	
Linda Jeffrey	Liberal	Brampton—Springdale	2003	3rd term	Resigned on March 25, 2014
Vacant		Brampton—Springdale	2003	3rd term	
Vic Dhillon	Liberal	Brampton West	2003	3rd term	
Dave Levac	Liberal	Brant	1999	4th term	
Bill Walker	Progressive Conservative	Bruce—Grey—Owen Sound	2011	1st term	
Jane McKenna	Progressive Conservative	Burlington	2011	1st term	
Rob Leone	Progressive Conservative	Cambridge	2011	1st term	
Jack MacLaren	Progressive Conservative	Carleton—Mississippi Mills	2011	1st term	
Rick Nicholls	Progressive Conservative	Chatham-Kent—Essex	2011	1st term	
Jonah Schein	New Democrat	Davenport	2011	1st term	
Michael Coteau	Liberal	Don Valley East	2011	1st term	
Kathleen Wynne	Liberal	Don Valley West	2003	3rd term	Premier since February 11, 2013
Sylvia Jones	Progressive Conservative	Dufferin—Caledon	2007	2nd term	
John O'Toole	Progressive Conservative	Durham	1995	5th term	
Mike Colle	Liberal	Eglinton—Lawrence	1995	5th term	
Jeff Yurek	Progressive Conservative	Elgin—Middlesex—London	2011	1st term	
Taras Natyshak	New Democrat	Essex	2011	1st term	
Donna Cansfield	Liberal	Etobicoke Centre	2003	3rd term	
Laurel Broten	Liberal	Etobicoke—Lakeshore	2003	3rd term	Resigned on July 2, 2013
Doug Holyday	Progressive Conservative	Etobicoke—Lakeshore	2013	1st term	Elected in a by-election on August 1, 2013
Shafiq Qaadri	Liberal	Etobicoke North	2003	3rd term	
Grant Crack	Liberal	Glengarry—Prescott—Russell	2011	1st term	
Liz Sandals	Liberal	Guelph	2003	3rd term	
Toby Barrett	Progressive Conservative	Haldimand—Norfolk	1995	5th term	
Laurie Scott	Progressive Conservative	Haliburton—Kawartha Lakes—Brock	2003, 2011	3rd term*	
Ted Chudleigh	Progressive Conservative	Halton	1995	5th term	
Andrea Horwath	New Democrat	Hamilton Centre	2004	3rd term	
Paul Miller	New Democrat	Hamilton East—Stoney Creek	2007	2nd term	
Monique Taylor	New Democrat	Hamilton Mountain	2011	1st term	
Lisa Thompson	Progressive Conservative	Huron—Bruce	2011	1st term	
Sarah Campbell	New Democrat	Kenora—Rainy River	2011	1st term	
John Gerretsen	Liberal	Kingston and the Islands	1995	5th term	
John Milloy	Liberal	Kitchener Centre	2003	3rd term	
Michael Harris	Progressive Conservative	Kitchener—Conestoga	2011	1st term	
Elizabeth Witmer	Progressive Conservative	Kitchener—Waterloo	1990	6th term	Resigned on April 27, 2012
Catherine Fife	New Democrat	Kitchener—Waterloo	2012	1st term	Elected in a by-election on September 6, 2012
Monte McNaughton	Progressive Conservative	Lambton—Kent—Middlesex	2011	1st term	
Randy Hillier	Progressive Conservative	Lanark—Frontenac—Lennox and Addington	2007	2nd term	
Steve Clark	Progressive Conservative	Leeds—Grenville	2010	2nd term	
Teresa Armstrong	New Democrat	London—Fanshawe	2011	1st term	
Deb Matthews	Liberal	London North Centre	2003	3rd term	
Chris Bentley	Liberal	London West	2003	3rd term	Resigned on February 14, 2013
Peggy Sattler	New Democrat	London West	2013	1st term	Elected in a by-election on August 1, 2013
Michael Chan	Liberal	Markham—Unionville	2007	3rd term	
Amrit Mangat	Liberal	Mississauga—Brampton South	2007	2nd term	
Dipika Damerla	Liberal	Mississauga East—Cooksville	2011	1st term	
Harinder Takhar	Liberal	Mississauga—Erindale	2003	3rd term	
Charles Sousa	Liberal	Mississauga South	2007	2nd term	
Bob Delaney	Liberal	Mississauga—Streetsville	2003	3rd term	
Lisa MacLeod	Progressive Conservative	Nepean—Carleton	2006	3rd term	
Frank Klees	Progressive Conservative	Newmarket—Aurora	1995	5th term	
Kim Craitor	Liberal	Niagara Falls	2003	3rd term	Resigned on September 24, 2013
Wayne Gates	New Democrat	Niagara Falls	2014	1st term	Elected in a by-election on February 13, 2014
Tim Hudak	Progressive Conservative	Niagara West—Glanbrook	1995	5th term	
France Gélinas	New Democrat	Nickel Belt	2007	2nd term	
Vic Fedeli	Progressive Conservative	Nipissing	2011	1st term	
Rob Milligan	Progressive Conservative	Northumberland—Quinte West	2011	1st term	
Helena Jaczek	Liberal	Oak Ridges—Markham	2007	2nd term	
Kevin Flynn	Liberal	Oakville	2003	3rd term	
Jerry Ouellette	Progressive Conservative	Oshawa	1995	5th term	
Yasir Naqvi	Liberal	Ottawa Centre	2007	2nd term	
Phil McNeely	Liberal	Ottawa—Orléans	2003	3rd term	
Dalton McGuinty	Liberal	Ottawa South	1990	6th term	Premier until February 11, 2013; resigned on June 12, 2013.
John Fraser	Liberal	Ottawa South	2013	1st term	Elected in a by-election on August 1, 2013
Madeleine Meilleur	Liberal	Ottawa—Vanier	2003	3rd term	
Bob Chiarelli	Liberal	Ottawa West—Nepean	1987, 2010	5th term*	
Ernie Hardeman	Progressive Conservative	Oxford	1995	5th term	
Cheri DiNovo	New Democrat	Parkdale—High Park	2006	3rd term	
Norm Miller	Progressive Conservative	Parry Sound—Muskoka	2001	4th term	
Randy Pettapiece	Progressive Conservative	Perth—Wellington	2011	1st term	
Jeff Leal	Liberal	Peterborough	2003	3rd term	
Tracy MacCharles	Liberal	Pickering—Scarborough East	2011	1st term	
Todd Smith	Progressive Conservative	Prince Edward—Hastings	2011	1st term	
John Yakabuski	Progressive Conservative	Renfrew—Nipissing—Pembroke	2003	3rd term	
Reza Moridi	Liberal	Richmond Hill	2007	2nd term	
Jim Bradley	Liberal	St. Catharines	1977	10th term	
Eric Hoskins	Liberal	St. Paul's	2009	2nd term	
Bob Bailey	Progressive Conservative	Sarnia—Lambton	2007	2nd term	
David Orazietti	Liberal	Sault Ste. Marie	2003	3rd term	
Soo Wong	Liberal	Scarborough—Agincourt	2011	1st term	
Brad Duguid	Liberal	Scarborough Centre	2003	3rd term	
Margarett Best	Liberal	Scarborough—Guildwood	2007	2nd term	Resigned on June 27, 2013
Mitzie Hunter	Liberal	Scarborough—Guildwood	2013	1st term	Elected in a by-election on August 1, 2013
Bas Balkissoon	Liberal	Scarborough—Rouge River	2005	3rd term	
Lorenzo Berardinetti	Liberal	Scarborough Southwest	2003	3rd term	
Jim Wilson	Progressive Conservative	Simcoe—Grey	1990	6th term	
Garfield Dunlop	Progressive Conservative	Simcoe North	1999	4th term	
Jim McDonell	Progressive Conservative	Stormont—Dundas—South Glengarry	2011	1st term	
Rick Bartolucci	Liberal	Sudbury	1995	5th term	
Peter Shurman	Progressive Conservative	Thornhill	2007	2nd term	Resigned on December 31, 2013
Gila Martow	Progressive Conservative	Thornhill	2014	1st term	Elected in a by-election on February 13, 2014
Bill Mauro	Liberal	Thunder Bay—Atikokan	2003	3rd term	
Michael Gravelle	Liberal	Thunder Bay—Superior North	1995	5th term	
John Vanthof	New Democrat	Timiskaming—Cochrane	2011	1st term	
Gilles Bisson	New Democrat	Timmins—James Bay	1990	6th term	
Glen Murray	Liberal	Toronto Centre	2010	2nd term	
Peter Tabuns	New Democrat	Toronto—Danforth	2006	3rd term	
Rosario Marchese	New Democrat	Trinity—Spadina	1990	6th term	
Greg Sorbara	Liberal	Vaughan	1985, (Note: York North/York Centre) 2002	7th term*	Resigned on August 1, 2012
Steven Del Duca	Liberal	Vaughan	2012	1st term	Elected in a by-election on September 6, 2012
Cindy Forster	New Democrat	Welland	2011	1st term	
Ted Arnott	Progressive Conservative	Wellington—Halton Hills	1990	6th term	
Christine Elliott	Progressive Conservative	Whitby—Oshawa	2006	3rd term	
David Zimmer	Liberal	Willowdale	2003	3rd term	
Dwight Duncan	Liberal	Windsor—Tecumseh	1995	5th term	Resigned on February 14, 2013
Percy Hatfield	New Democrat	Windsor—Tecumseh	2013	1st term	Elected in a by-election on August 1, 2013
Teresa Piruzza	Liberal	Windsor West	2011	1st term	
Monte Kwinter	Liberal	York Centre	1985	8th term	
Julia Munro	Progressive Conservative	York—Simcoe	1995	5th term	
Laura Albanese	Liberal	York South—Weston	2007	2nd term	
Mario Sergio	Liberal	York West	1995	5th term	

== Membership changes ==
=== Change in composition ===
Number of members per party by date	2011	2012			2013							2014	
Number of members per party by date	Oct 6	Apr 27	Aug 1	Sep 6	Feb 14	Jun 12	Jun 28	Jul 2	Aug 1	Sep 24	Dec 31	Feb 13	Mar 25
Liberal	53		52	53	51	50	49	48	50	49			48
Progressive Conservative	37	36							37		36	37	
New Democratic	17			18					20			21	
Total members	107	106	105	107	105	104	103	102	107	106	105	107	106
Vacant	0	1	2	0	2	3	4	5	0	1	2	0	1
Government majority	−1	0	−1		−3	−4	−5	−6	−7	−8	−7	−9	−10

=== Changes of membership or partisan affiliations ===
Electoral district	Before			After seat changed hands			
Electoral district	Date	Reason	Member exited	New Member	Date	Event	Note
Kitchener—Waterloo	April 27, 2012	Resignation (Note: Upon appointed chair of the Workplace Safety & Insurance Board)	Elizabeth Witmer	Catherine Fife	Sep 6, 2012	byelection	minus
Vaughan	August 1, 2012	Resignation (Note: Retirement from politics)	Greg Sorbara	Steven Del Duca	Sep 6, 2012	byelection	
London West	Feb 14, 2013	Resignation (Note: retirement from politics upon resignation of the McGuinty ministry)	Chris Bentley	Peggy Sattler	August 1, 2013	byelection	minus
Windsor—Tecumseh	Feb 14, 2013	Resignation	Dwight Duncan	Percy Hatfield	August 1, 2013	byelection	minus
Ottawa South	June 12, 2013	Resignation	Dalton McGuinty	John Fraser	August 1, 2013	byelection	
Scarborough—Guildwood	June 27, 2013	Resignation	Margarett Best	Mitzie Hunter	August 1, 2013	byelection	
Etobicoke—Lakeshore	July 2, 2013	Resignation (Note: Family moved to Nova Scotia)	Laurel Broten	Doug Holyday	August 1, 2013	byelection	minus
Niagara Falls	Sep 24, 2013	Resignation	Kim Craitor	Wayne Gates	Feb 13, 2014	byelection	minus
Thornhill	Dec 31, 2013	Resignation	Peter Shurman	Gila Martow	Feb 13, 2014	byelection	
Brampton—Springdale	March 25, 2014	Resignation (Note: Resigned to seek election as Mayor of Brampton)	Linda Jeffrey	Vacant at dissolution		n/a	
