= Thornhill, Ontario =

Thornhill
- Suburban district
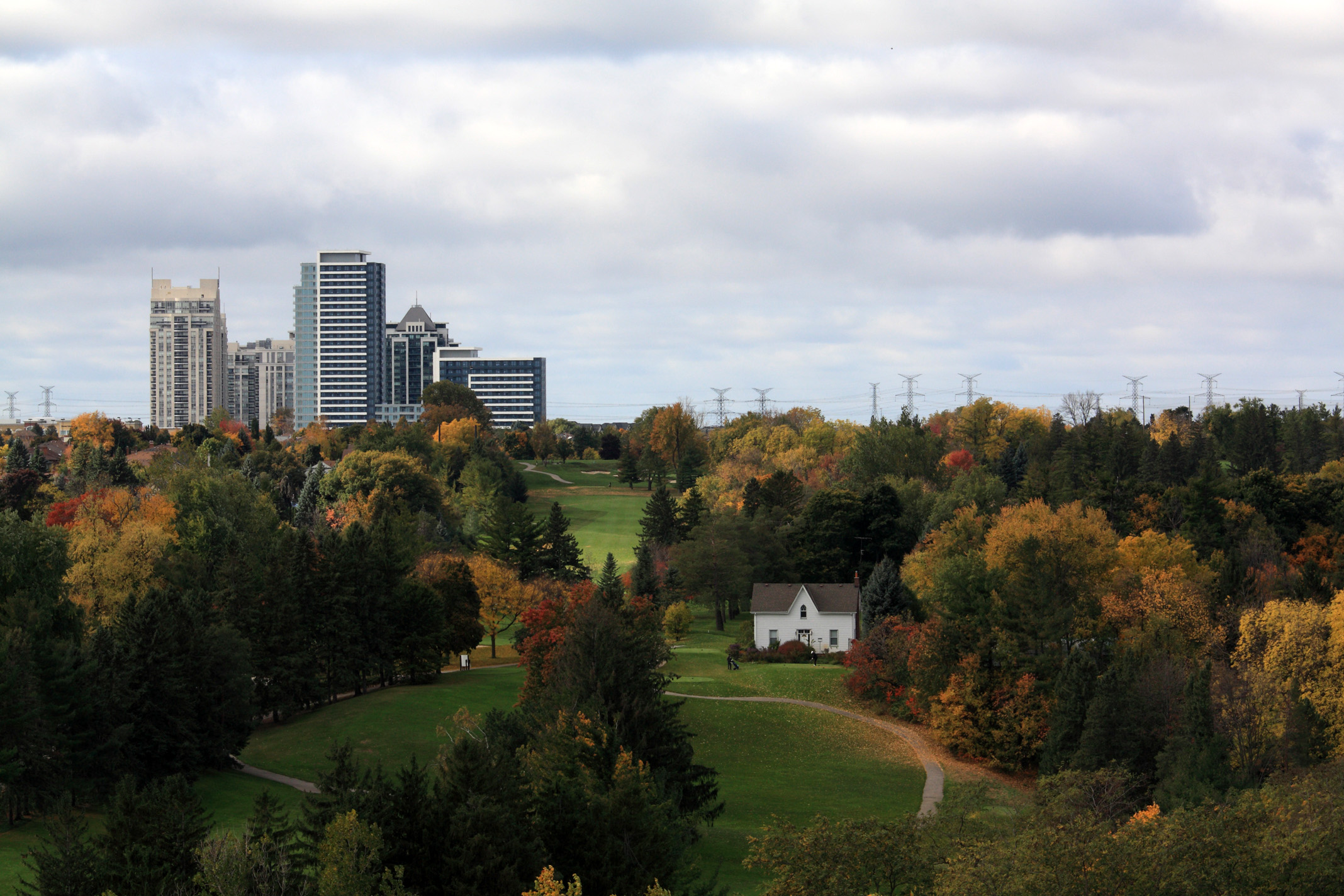
- Skyline of Thornhill

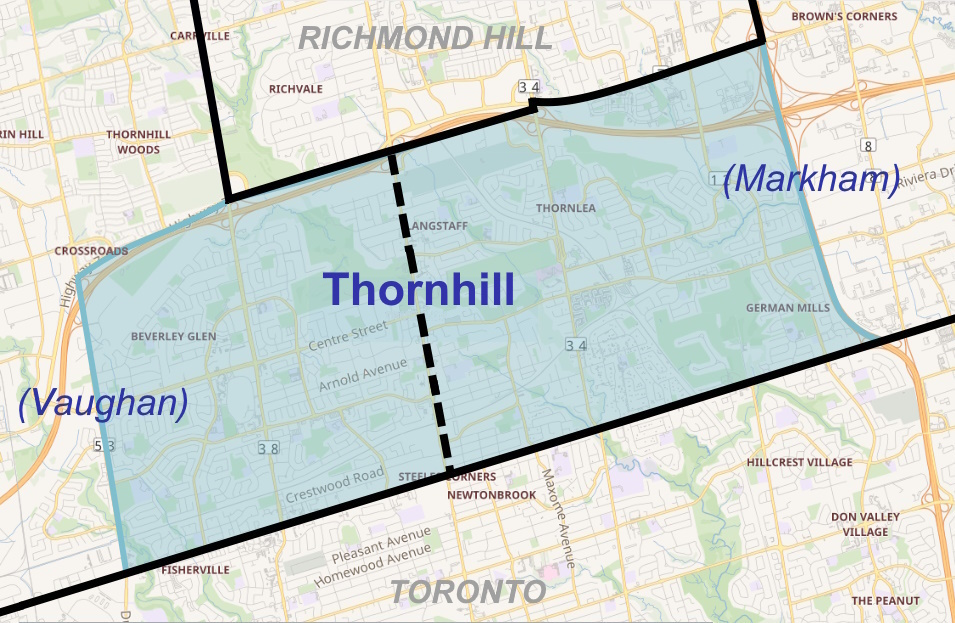
- Thornhill within Vaughan and Markham
- Coordinates: 43°48′58″N 79°25′28″W
- Country: Canada
- Province: Ontario
- Regional Municipality: York
- Cities: Vaughan and Markham
- Settled: 1794
- Incorporated: 1931 (Police village)
- Changed division: 1971 York Region from York County
- Amalgamated: 1971 into Vaughan and Markham (as Towns) 1990 (as City of Vaughan) and 2012 (as City of Markham)

Government
  - MPs: Melissa Lantsman (Thornhill); Tim Hodgson (Markham—Thornhill)
  - MPPs: Laura Smith (Thornhill); Logan Kanapathi (Markham—Thornhill)
  - Councillors: Vaughan: Chris Ainsworth (Ward 4); Gila Martow (Ward 5); Markham: Keith Irish (Ward 1)

Area
  - Total: 62.90 km^{2} (24.29 sq mi)

Population (2016)
  - Total: 112,719
  - Density: 1,791.9/km^{2} (4,641/sq mi)
- Postal codes: L3T and L4J

Thornhill is a suburban district in the Regional Municipality of York in Ontario, Canada. The western portion of Thornhill is within the City of Vaughan and its eastern portion is within the City of Markham, with Yonge Street forming the boundary between Vaughan and Markham. Thornhill is situated along the northern border of Toronto, centred on Yonge, and is also immediately south of the City of Richmond Hill. Once a police village, Thornhill is still a postal designation. As of 2016, its total population, including both its Vaughan and Markham sections, was 112,719.

== History ==
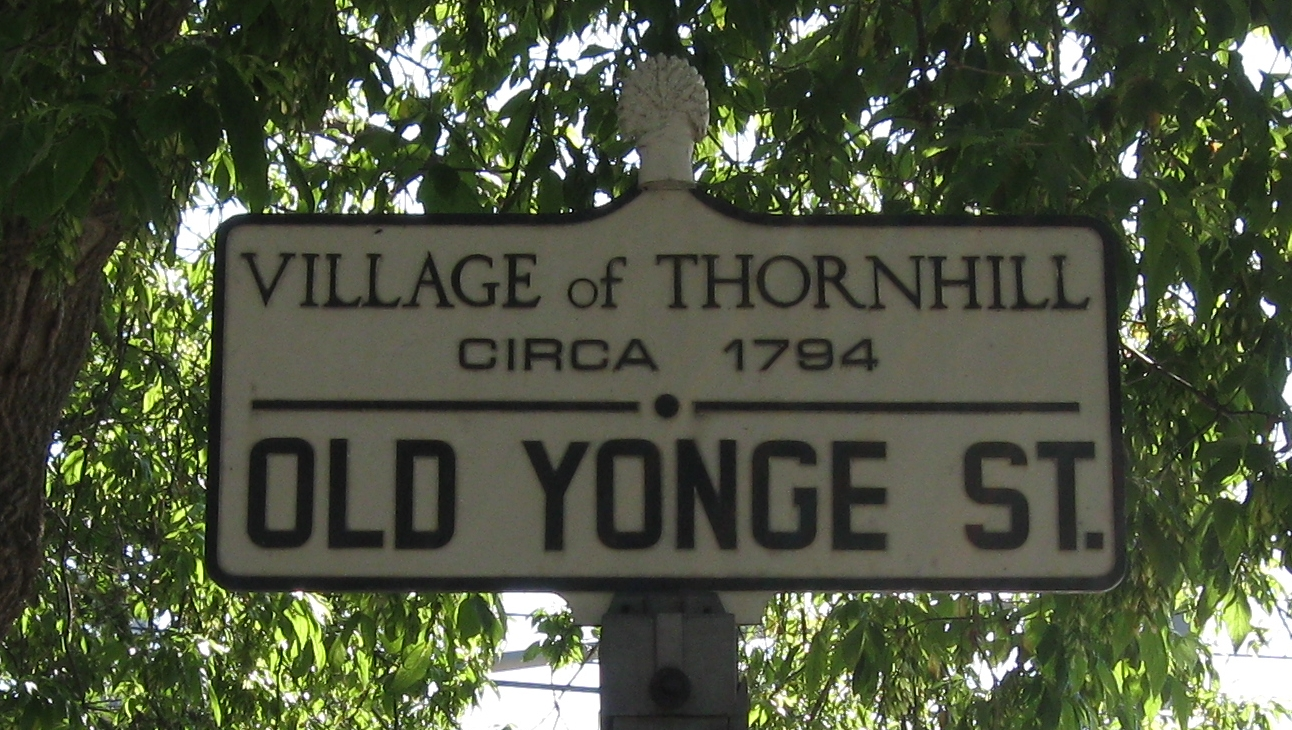
The corner of Old Yonge Street and Centre Street

=== Early history ===
Thornhill was founded in 1794. The original boundaries were the northern bounds of the Ladies Golf Club on the east side of Yonge and further north on the west side of Yonge; southern end between John Street and Arnold Avenue/Elgin Street. Its first settlers on Yonge Street in Thornhill were Asa Johnson (who settled on the Vaughan side) and Nicholas Miller (c. 1760–1810; who settled on the Markham side). Of particular importance was the arrival of Benjamin Thorne (January 4, 1794 – July 2, 1848) in 1820 from Dorset, England, who was operating a gristmill, a sawmill, and a tannery in the community. The settlement came to be known as Thorne's Mills, and later, Thorne's Hill, from which its current name is derived. (Thorne committed suicide in 1848, after a serious wheat market crash.)

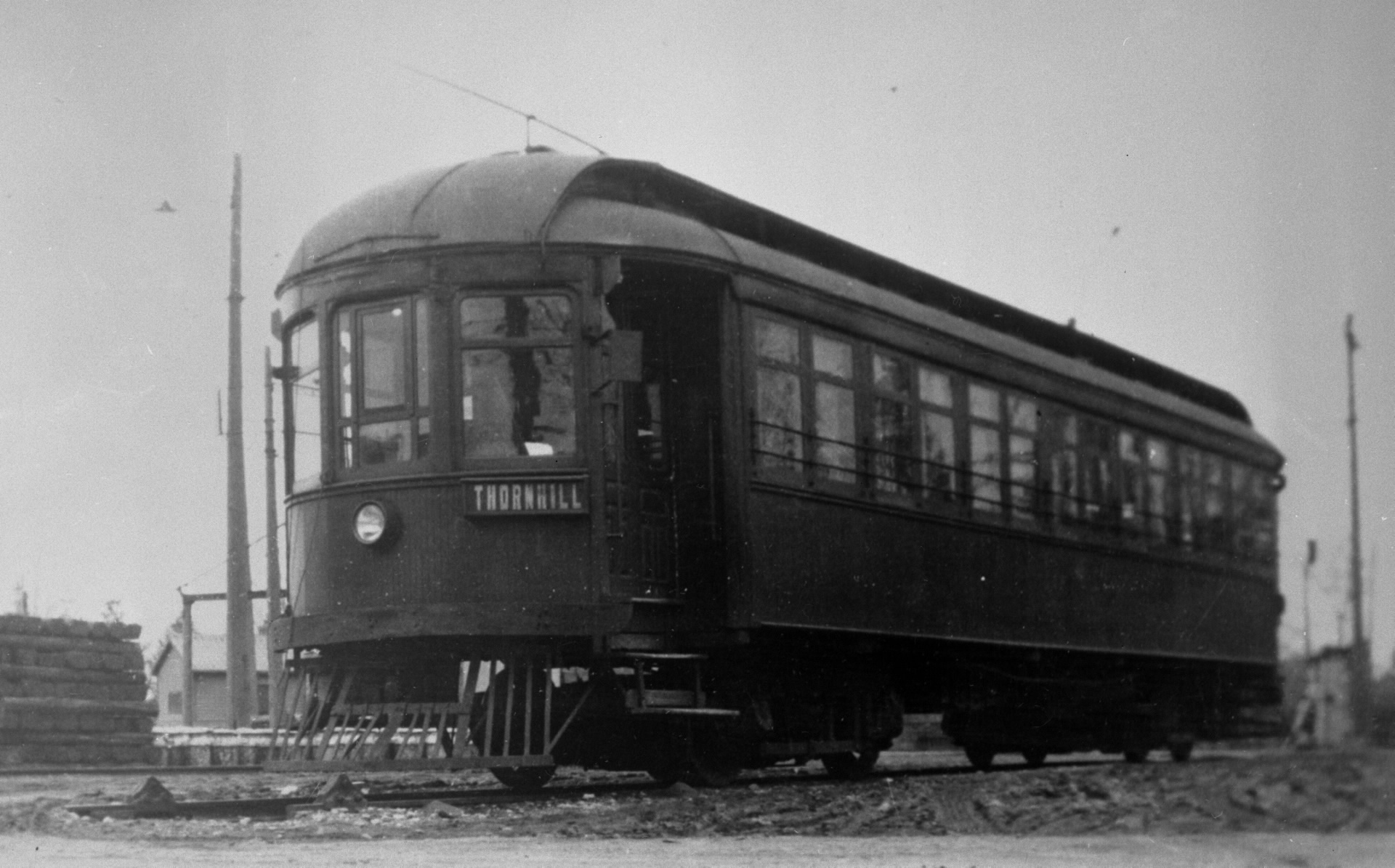
Radial car to Thornhill on the Metropolitan line

Between 1830 and 1848, Thornhill experienced a period of continued growth and prosperity. The business district of Thornhill developed on its portion of Yonge Street, between Centre Street and John Street. Stagecoaches travelled between Holland Landing (Lake Simcoe) and York (Toronto) as Yonge Street's road conditions improved with new stonework. During this prosperous period, several churches, many of which are still standing today, were constructed.

Thornhill's location along Yonge Street, a major transportation route, proved beneficial to the community's growth throughout much of the twentieth century. The implementation of the electric radial Metropolitan line along Yonge Street in 1898 running north to Sutton and south to Toronto meant that, for the first time, people could reside in Thornhill and work in Toronto. By the 1920s, automobiles also facilitated travel along Yonge Street.

=== 20th and 21st centuries ===
In 1931, Thornhill became a "Police Village"; before that time, Thornhill had no independent status and was split between the townships of Vaughan and Markham along Yonge Street, since the creation of municipal government in 1850. Before 1931, each township administered its half of the village. The creation of the Police Village gave Thornhill its own political boundaries. The village was headed by a reeve.

In 1971, York Region was created, part of a wave of municipal re-organization which converted many townships into towns and eliminated many of the municipal forms of organization which had existed within those townships. The establishment of a regional administration effectively eliminated the Police Village of Thornhill. Thornhill's administration reverted to Markham and Vaughan, which were enlarged in territory and upgraded to Town status at this time.

However, many social institutions remained organized around the former municipal entities eliminated in 1971. Like neighbouring communities such as Woodbridge, Maple, and Unionville – and more so than was the case for historic suburban communities within the City of Toronto – community organizations such as local newspapers, and sports teams continued to operate under a Thornhill administrative structure. As an example, until the mid-1990s residents of Thornhill who wanted to play high-level hockey were required to play for a Thornhill team.

While the old village of Thornhill revolved around Yonge Street between Centre and John Streets, the neighbourhood is typically thought to be between Dufferin Street to the west, Highway 7 to the north, Steeles Avenue to the south, and Highway 404 to the east.

==== Suburbanization ====
Thornhill's growth since the 1960s and 1970s has been largely connected to its location bordering what is now the City of Toronto.

Growth has continued apace. Developments have sprung up across various areas of Thornhill in each of the municipal districts which encompass Thornhill, following the development patterns of the Greater Toronto Area.

==== Coyote problem ====
In the summer of 2020, after the emergence of the COVID-19 pandemic, the area around Hefhill Park, near Bathurst and Centre Streets, began experiencing a problem with its coyote population. As reported by the Toronto Star, Thornhill residents' "daily routines have been completely altered after a pack of coyotes living nearby appears to have lost its fear of humans". The issue exacerbated when dogs began mysteriously disappearing and a 14-year-old girl was chased by one of the coyotes.

As stated by the Toronto Star "the coyotes' behaviour has changed [in 2020]. Before 2020 the animals were not aggressive and usually only seen by those living directly next to them. Now they are frequently spotted in people's yards, residential streets and on major intersections, the residents said". Residents of Thornhill continue to report sightings and attacks by coyotes to their local and regional governments as the issue remains unresolved.

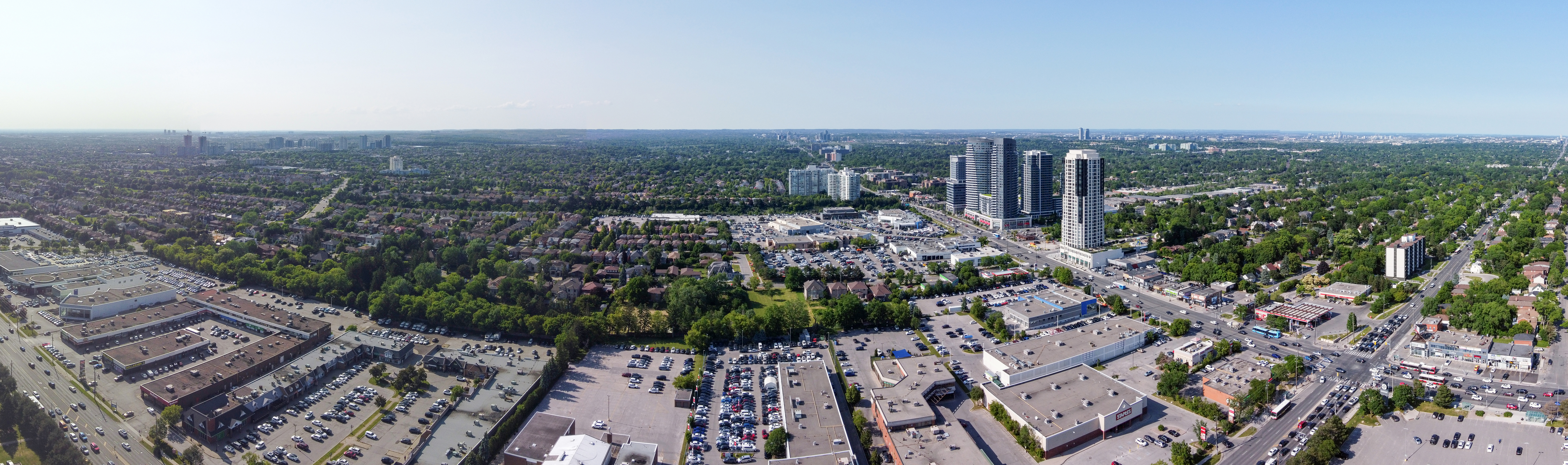
Thornhill, 2023

== Demographics ==
=== Ethnicity ===
Thornhill has a very ethnically diverse population. It is home to a significant number of Jewish, Chinese, Korean, Iranian, Indian, and Italian people. According to 2001 Federal Census data, the electoral district of Thornhill (which is not entirely congruent with the neighbourhood) consists of Chinese, the largest visible minority, accounting for almost 11% of total residents (12,610), followed by South Asian (6,595), Black (2,665), Korean (2,660), Filipino (2,535), and West Asian (2,355).

According to the 2009 Report of Canada's Demographic Task Force, Thornhill-Vaughan was in 2001 home to more than 33,000 members of the Jewish community out of 55,000 in this area.

== Government ==
Thornhill is split into Wards 4 and 5 in the City of Vaughan and Ward 1 in the City of Markham. It is represented by Chris Ainsworth (Vaughan Ward 4), Gila Martow (Vaughan Ward 5), and Keith Irish (Markham Ward 1).

Thornhill is also a federal and provincial riding. The Member of Parliament for Thornhill is Melissa Lantsman (Conservative), and the Member of Provincial Parliament is Laura Smith (Progressive Conservative).

== Infrastructure ==
=== Healthcare ===
There are no general hospitals in Thornhill, but a private hospital, Shouldice Hernia Centre, is located there.

=== Thornhill Community Centre ===
Located at Bayview and John Street (on the Markham side), the community centre features a double arena (home to the Thornhill Skating Club, Markham Majors and Islanders hockey clubs (with an east rink named for Bib Sherwood in 1999), therapy pool, gym room, running track, multi-purpose rooms and Markham Public Library branch. The complex was opened in 1975.

Thornhill Community Centre is home to the Markham Cat Adoption Centre & Education Centre, which was launched in 2016 and is partnered with the Ontario SPCA. It was the first cat adoption and education centre in the Greater Toronto Area, and the first cat adoption centre to be municipally funded in Ontario. The centre has housing for 18 cats and provides an accessible space for education in the area.

The Thornhill Seniors Club, also located in the community centre, was established in 2004 following expansions to the centre that began in 2003. It features a variety of activities for seniors in a space that boasts a TV lounge with a fireplace, full kitchen, activity rooms, and more.

The community centre hosted the Markham Thunder of the Canadian Women's Hockey League from 2017 to 2019.

Thornlea Pool is a public swimming pool located further north of the community centre near Thornlea Secondary School.

=== Parks ===
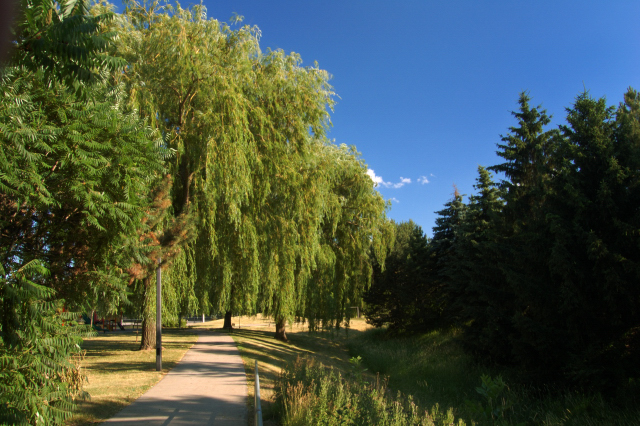
Conley Park

- Annswell Park
- Baker's Woods
- Bercy (Wycliffe) Park
- Don Valley Park
- Downham Green Park
- Edmund Seager Parkette
- Gallanough Park
- German Mills Settlers Park
- Gilmore Park
- Grandview Park
- Hefhill Park
- Oakbank Pond Park
- Paddock Park
- Pioneer Park
- Pomona Mills Park located near old grist mill and on old Brunshill Estate
- Rosedale North Park
- Royal Orchard Park
- Simonston Park
- Thornhill Park
- Vaughan Crest Park
- Wade Gate Park
- Winding Lane Park
- Woodland Park
- York Hill District Park
- Rowley Hill Park

=== Golf Courses ===
Thornhill is home to three courses:

The Thornhill Club (also as Thornhill Golf Club) opened in 1922 and designed by Stanley Thompson is a 18-hole course located on the west side of Yonge Street with Uplands Golf Course located on the northside and Ladies Golf Club of Toronto on the opposite side of Yonge. It hosted the 1945 Canadian Open.

Uplands Golf Course opened in 1922 and also designed by Stanley Thompson as a 18-hole course. In the 1980s it lost half to development, the land is now owned by city but lease to the club. Uplands Ski Centre was opened in 1989 from part of the former course not used for housing.

Ladies Golf Club of Toronto opened in 1924 is also a Stanley Thompson designed course.

== Education ==
=== Public schools ===
Secondary schools

- Thornhill Secondary School, established in 1955
- Thornlea Secondary School, established in 1969
- Hodan Nalayeh Secondary School, established in 1989 (as Vaughan Secondary School until 2021)
- Westmount Collegiate Institute, established in 1996

Elementary schools

- Bakersfield Public School, established in 2003
- Baythorn Public School
- Bayview Glen Public School
- Bayview Fairways Public School
- Brownridge Public School
- Charlton Public School
- Doncrest Public School
- E.J. Sand Public School
- German Mills Public School
- Henderson Avenue Public School
- Herbert H. Carnegie Public School
- Johnsview Village Public School
- Julliard Public School
- Louis Honoré Fréchette Public School
- Roberta Bondar Public School
- Royal Orchard Public School
- Rosedale Heights Public School
- Stornoway Crescent Public School
- Thornhill Public School
- Ventura Park Public School
- Westminster Public School
- Willowbrook Public School
- Wilshire Elementary School
- Woodland Public School
- Yorkhill Elementary School

Catholic schools

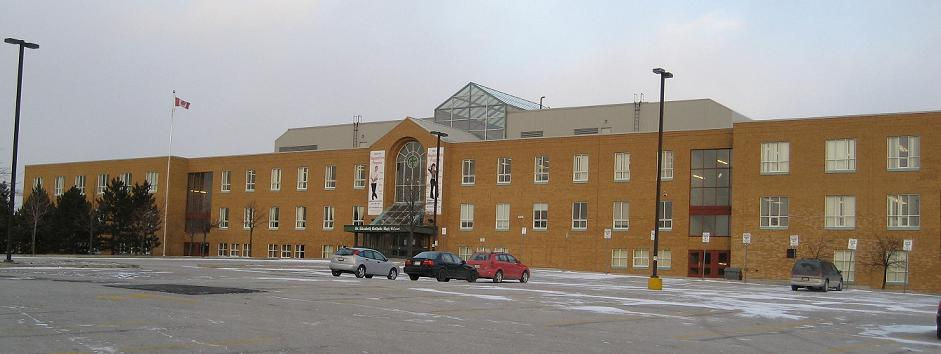
St. Elizabeth Catholic High School

- Blessed Bishop Scalabrini Catholic Elementary School
- Holy Family Catholic Elementary School, closed, currently rented to E.J. Sand Public School
- St. Elizabeth Catholic High School, established in 1987
- St. Joseph the Worker
- St. Robert Catholic High School
- St. Anthony Catholic Elementary School
- St. Michael Catholic Academy
- St. Luke Catholic Elementary School

=== Private schools ===
Jewish schools

Secondary:

- Ner Israel Yeshiva College

Primary:

- Bialik Hebrew Day School
- Cheder Chabad
- Eitz Chaim Day Schools
- Netivot HaTorah Day School
- Tamim Academy of York Region

== Media ==
- Salam Toronto – Bilingual Persian–English weekly paper

== Farmer's market ==
York Farmers Market has existed on Yonge Street since 1953. Unlike many of York Region's farmers markets that are outdoor, it is housed in a permanent building structure.

== Notable people ==
=== Arts ===
==== Film and broadcasting ====
- Hayden Christensen – Actor, most notable for playing Anakin Skywalker in the Star Wars prequel trilogy
- Sidney M. Cohen – TV Director and Producer The Mad Dash and Thrill of a Lifetime & "Accessibility in Action"
- Lauren Collins – Actress, notable role of Paige on Degrassi: The Next Generation
- Daniel Dale – Reporter and fact-checker for CNN
- Jian Ghomeshi – musician and ex. CBC radio personality
- Corey Haim – Actor, best known for roles in movies, such as Lucas, and The Lost Boys
- Tajja Isen – Voice actress
- Simcha Jacobovici – Known as "The Naked Archaeologist"
- Hadley Kay – Voice actor
- Paul McGuire – Host on CMT (Canada)
- Dan Shulman – Sports broadcaster who works for ESPN and Sportsnet
- Stu Stone – Actor and voiceover performer
- Daniel Magder – Actor

==== Literature ====
- Gordon Korman – Author, especially of children's and young adult books

==== Music ====
- Adam "Frank Dukes" Feeney – Grammy Award-winning music producer
- By Divine Right – indie rock band
- Gerald Eaton – R&B singer-songwriter, producer and lead singer of The Philosopher Kings
- Moxy Früvous – Musical group of the 1990s whose songs featured satirical themes (included CBC personality Jian Ghomeshi)
- Hayden – Folk rock musician and songwriter
- hHead – alternative rock band of the 1990s
- Judy & David – children's recording artists, composers, television personalities, and live concert artists
- Ryan and Dan Kowarsky – Singers, members of the music group b4-4
- Jon Levine – Musician, Producer – The Philosopher Kings
- Anne Murray – singer – lived in one of Thornhill's oldest districts near the pond for several years
- Matthew Tishler - Songwriter, Music Producer
- The Philosopher Kings – R&B band
- Jackie Richardson – Gospel, blues and jazz singer

==== Visual arts ====
- Fred S. Haines – Painter (1879–1960)
- J. E. H. MacDonald – Group of Seven painter
- Thoreau MacDonald – illustrator, designer and calligrapher

=== Sports ===
- Bianca Andreescu, professional tennis player; 2019 US Open singles champion
- Alon Badat (born 1989) - Israeli soccer player
- Adrian Cann (born 1980) – Professional soccer player
- Tomer Chencinski (born 1984) – Israeli-Canadian soccer player
- Gillian Ferrari – Women's ice hockey player; won gold medal for Canadian women's hockey team in 2006 Winter Olympics
- Alison Goring – Women's curling champion
- Adam Henrich (born 1984) – Professional ice hockey player for Coventry Blaze of the Elite Ice Hockey League
- Michael Henrich (born 1980) – Professional ice hockey player for Dornbirner EC in Austria
- Eric Himelfarb (born 1983) – Professional ice hockey player for Linköpings HC in the Swedish Elitserien (SEL)
- Joshua Ho-Sang (born 1996) – Professional ice hockey player in the St. Louis Blues organization
- Mitch Marner – Professional hockey player for the Vegas Golden Knights
- Dominic Moore – Professional ice hockey player with the Toronto Maple Leafs
- Steve Moore – Professional ice hockey player with the Colorado Avalanche until a career-ending injury
- Milos Raonic (born 1990) – Professional tennis player
- Paul Rosen (born 1960) – Paralympic ice hockey player; won gold medal for Canadian men's paralympic hockey team in 2006 Winter Olympics
- Ben Silverman (born 1987) – Professional golfer
- Andrew Wiggins (born 1995) – Professional basketball player for the Golden State Warriors of the NBA

=== Other personalities ===
- Craig Kielburger – Canadian author, social entrepreneur, Creator and founder of Free the Children, child-run campaign against child labour and injustice
- Marc Kielburger – Canadian author, social entrepreneur, Co Founder of WE Charity, CEO of ME to WE
- Robert McGhee – Archaeologist and author specializing in the archaeology of the Arctic
- Sue Rodriguez – Advocate of the right to die with dignity. Her story was the topic of the 1998 feature film At the End of the Day: The Sue Rodriguez Story
- The Bee Family – internet personalities

== See also ==
- List of unincorporated communities in Ontario
