= Bernie Farber =

Canadian journalist and activist (born 1951)

Bernie M. Farber
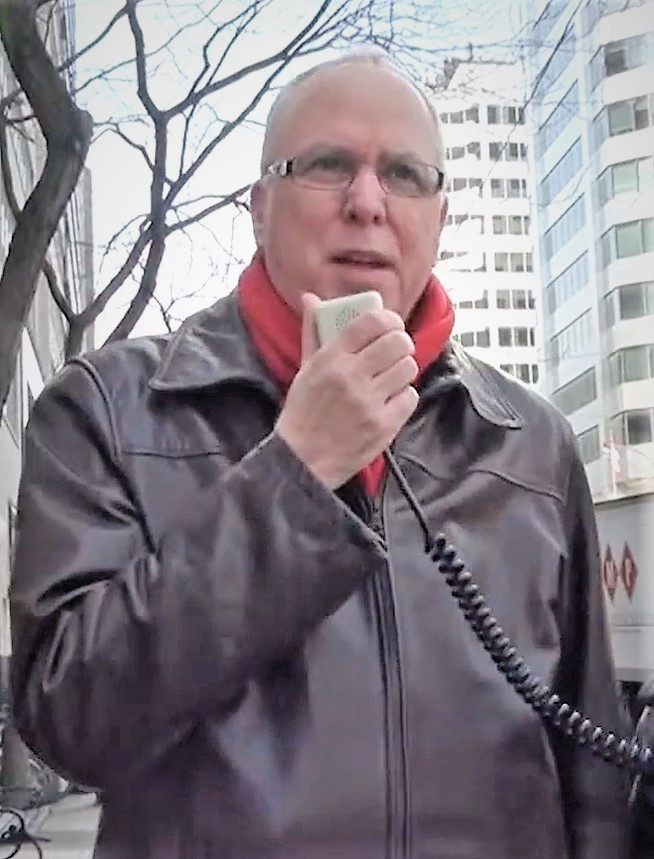
- Farber at a Roma Community Centre rally in Toronto in 2013
- Organization: Canadian Jewish Congress

Bernie M. Farber (born 1951) is a Canadian writer, commentator, and the former chief executive officer of the Canadian Jewish Congress and a social activist. He has testified before the Canadian courts as an expert witness on hate crime.

He was appointed CEO of the Mosaic Institute, a Canadian NGO that promotes pluralism, peace and conflict resolution internationally, in August 2015 and retired on October 1, 2017, though he remained on the NGO's advisory board. Farber was previously CEO of the Paloma Foundation, an NGO which works with homeless youth shelters until his appointment with the Mosaic Institute. He also writes on human and civil rights issues for the Huffington Post and NOW Magazine, as well as various newspapers across Canada, and is frequently interviewed on these topics by the media. He was a weekly columnist for the Canadian Jewish News from 2013 until the paper's demise in 2020.

He also served as the chair of the Canadian Anti-Hate Network from 2018 until 2023 and now serves as founding chair emeritus.

== Early life and education ==
Farber was born in Ottawa, Ontario. His father was a Polish Jew who lost his first wife, two children and other family members in the Holocaust. Farber cites his father's experience as a major motivation in his life, saying, "the pain my father endured during the war is what drove me to fight for social justice today."

Farber received a Bachelor of Arts degree from Carleton University in Ottawa where he was involved in many social causes. He was a student leader with Ottawa's Jewish community and was also involved in the campaign to pressure the Soviet Union to allow Soviet Jews to emigrate. As the director of Ottawa's Jewish Community Centre, Farber also directed its day camp in the mid-1970s.

== Social work ==
He graduated in 1975 and found a job with the Children's Aid Society (CAS) and the Youth Services Bureau of Ottawa-Carleton. While working for the Children's Aid Society in the early 1980s, Farber served as president of Ontario Public Service Employees Union Local 454, representing over 300 social and child-care workers. Farber currently runs the Canadian Anti-Hate Network with Evan Balgord, a non-profit organization which as its mission statement claims that it: "monitors, researches, and counters hate groups by providing education and information on hate groups to the public, media, researchers, courts, law enforcement, and community groups."

== Canadian Jewish Congress ==
Farber was employed by the Canadian Jewish Congress (CJC) from 1984 until 2011. He was appointed chief executive officer in 2005 and had previously been executive director of the CJC's Ontario section and CJC's National Community Relations Director. The Centre for Israel and Jewish Affairs absorbed the CJC on July 1, 2011.

Farber was appointed by the Ontario government to serve as a member of the Hate Crimes Community Working Group. He also serves on the city of Vaughan, Ontario's Mayor's Task Force on Community Safety & Security. Farber is also an associate member of the Ontario Association of Chiefs of Police.

Farber has contributed articles on the Jewish political scene, human rights issues, the Holocaust, hate crime and white supremacy to newspapers including The Globe and Mail, the National Post, the Toronto Star, and others. He has expressed his own or the CJC's views in newspapers such as The Washington Post and The New York Times. In 1997, Farber was the editor of and wrote portions of From Marches to Modems: A Report on Organized Hate in Metropolitan Toronto, commissioned by the Access and Equity Centre of the municipality of metro Toronto.

Farber appears in the 1994 educational video Who is Peter Iswolsky?, conducting an anti-racism workshop for high school students. The film was co-sponsored by the CJC and the National Congress of Italian Canadians.

Regarding the proposed beatification of Pope Pius XII, Farber has said it is improper to move the process forward until the Holy See's archives from the Second World War are fully released.

Mr. Farber advocates the abolition of all public recognition accorded to Canada's first Prime Minister, Sir John A. Macdonald. He believes that Macdonald's legacy is one of "cruelty, barbarism and even genocide."

=== Alleged Heritage Front plot ===
In December 1994, Canada's Security Intelligence Review Committee reported that the white supremacist group Heritage Front had developed a "hit list" targeting 22 Canadians for murder, most of them Metropolitan Toronto Jews. One member had allegedly planned an attack on the CJC offices to "take some people out", with Farber believed to be the primary target.

Over the preceding years, Heritage Front had been infiltrated by, and become largely directed by, Grant Bristow, an undercover agent of the Canadian Security Intelligence Service (CSIS). In August 1994, a report by the Toronto Sun exposed CSIS domestic spying including Bristow's undercover role in Heritage Front, effectively putting an end to any plot.

=== Pride controversy ===
Farber, who is not gay, was mocked by columnist Antonia Zerbisias in 2009 for wearing a "Nobody knows I'm gay" T-shirt (From Don't Panic!, an LGBTQ clothing company) while marching in Toronto's Pride parade as a protest against the inclusion of Queers Against Israeli Apartheid in the march. The Canadian Jewish Congress filed a complaint with the Toronto Star against Zerbisias "outing" Farber. The newspaper's public editor ruled that Zerbisias' comments "fell short of the Star's standards of fairness, accuracy and civility," but subsequently modified her assessment and criticized Farber and the CJC since, in their complaint, they did not "think to tell me that [Farber], along with dozens of others who marched with the Kulanu group, had worn a T-shirt that made its own ironic quip. That's context I sure wish I had known" and conceded that Zerbisias' comment "was intended as sarcastic irony, stock in trade for this columnist and blogger."

== Electoral record ==
Farber was on leave from the CJC's successor, the Canadian Council for Israel and Jewish Advocacy during his candidacy as the Ontario Liberal Party's nominee in the 2011 Ontario election in the riding of Thornhill. Farber received 40% support but lost to Progressive Conservative Peter Shurman by 2,500 votes.

2011 Ontario general election: Thornhill
| Party | Candidate | Votes | ±% | |
|---|---|---|---|---|
| Progressive Conservative | Peter Shurman | 20,971 | 46.71 | +0.81 |
| Liberal | Bernie Farber | 18,373 | 40.92 | -1.38 |
| New Democratic | Cindy Hackelberg | 4,024 | 8.96 | +3.46 |
| Green | Steff Duncan | 756 | 1.68 | -3.54 |
| Libertarian | Gene Balfour | 623 | 1.39 | |
| Freedom | Erin Gorman | 149 | 0.33 | +0.03 |
| Total valid votes | | 44,896 | 100.00 | |
| Total rejected, unmarked and declined ballots | | 239 | 0.53 | |
| Turnout | | 45,135 | 45.35 | |
| Eligible voters | | 99,517 | | |
| Progressive Conservative hold | | Swing | | +1.10 |
Source: Elections Ontario

== Gemini Power Corporation ==
From 2012 to 2015, Farber was the Senior Vice President for Gemini Power Corporation, working in partnership with First Nations to help develop sustainable business economies.

== Awards ==
In 1992, Farber was awarded the 125th Anniversary of the Confederation of Canada Medal. The commemorative medal was awarded to 40,000 Canadians for their contributions to community and country., Mr Farber has also received the Special Commendation Award from the Venerable Order of St. Johns and is a recipient of Canada's Sovereign Medal https://podcastaddict.com/episode/73407213 Farber also received the Charles "Chuck" Zaionz Award for Jewish Communal Service in December 2012 as well as the Queens Diamond Jubilee Medal.
