= Camp Shomria =

Jewish summer camps in North America

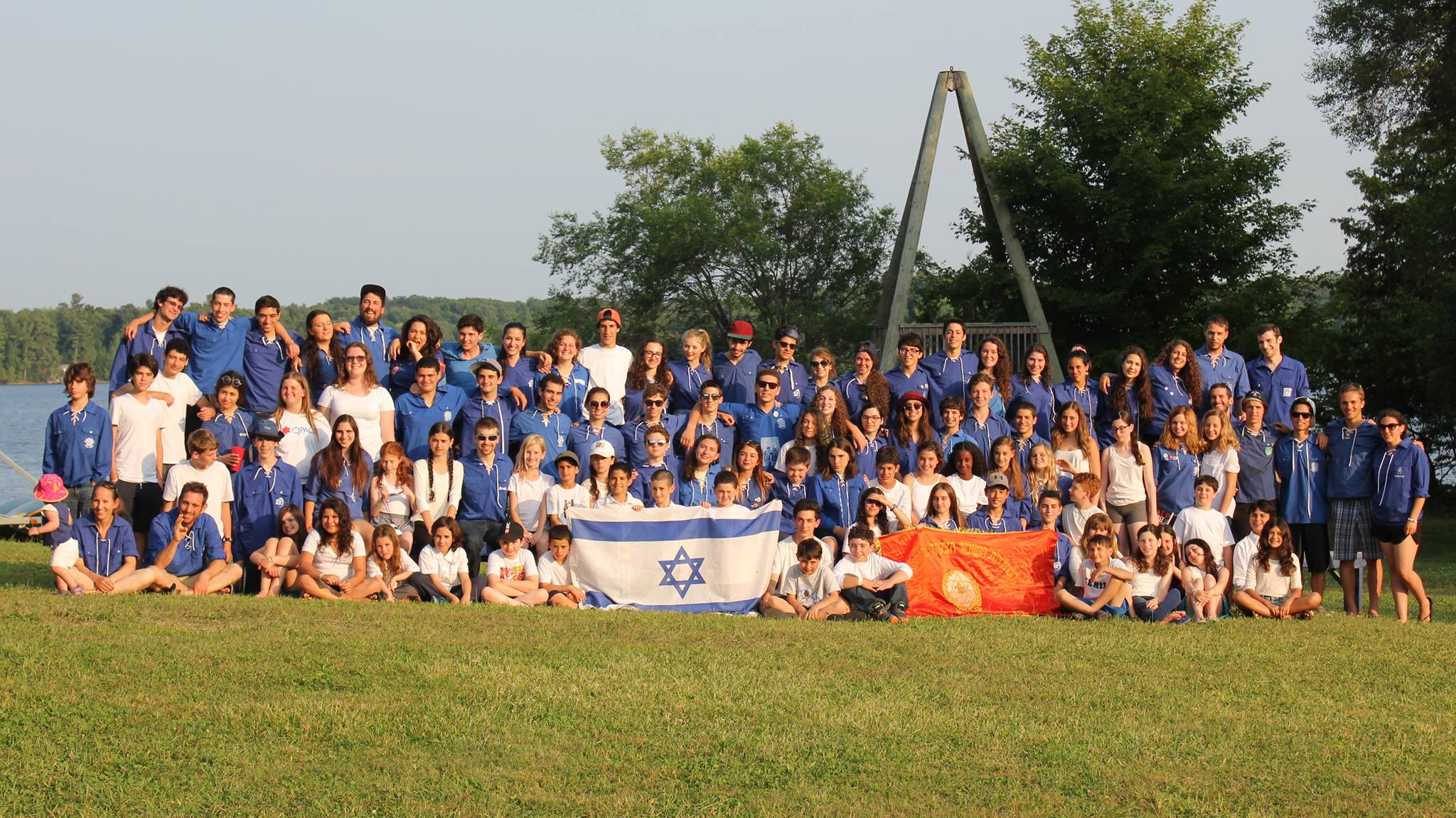
Camp Shomria Perth (2015)

Camp Shomria is the name used by several Jewish summer camps associated with the Hashomer Hatzair Progressive Zionist youth movement in North America. At present, Hashomer Hatzair North America operates two Camp Shomrias: one in Perth, Ontario, which has been operating since the late 1950s and takes campers from Canada and parts of the United States, and an older camp at Liberty, New York, in the Catskills, that was founded in the 1940s. Since 2003, Camp Shomria Liberty has included Israeli Arabs, Israeli Jews and Bedouins amongst its roster of campers in an attempt to break down barriers between Israeli Jews and Arabs. . Similarly, since 2011, Camp Shomria Perth has hosted the program Heart to Heart, which is made up of 20 Palestinian and Jewish Israeli youth and is aimed at equipping participants with the skills to work towards a shared society back in Israel. Heart to Heart is co-sponsored by Givat Haviva. Although founded in the 1940s, the actual site in Liberty was once a kibbutz training facility. Over the years, Hashomer Hatzair has operated other Camp Shomrias in California, Maryland, and in the Midwest.

== Groups (kvutzot) ==
The camp is divided into kvutzot, or groups. The names are taken from kibbutzim in Israel, such as Galon, Harel, Hazorea, Sasa, and Kfar Menachem. The campers are split into two age groups, with three years in each; Aleph, Bet, and Gimmel, which are arbitrary denominations corresponding to the beginning letters of the Hebrew alphabet. Campers older than twelve are in Tzofim, while younger children are in Chalutzim. Counselors-in-training are in a group of their own called Yedid in Perth and Kibbutzi in Liberty. Sixteen and older is Hadracha, or staff. During the second three-week period of their Yedid/Kibbutzi year, campers may (and most usually do) enter a program to go Israel, where they visit historical sites, gain exposure to Israeli culture, and spend time bonding with their kvutza. This program is also (and not coincidentally) called Yedid.
