= Laura Smith (Canadian politician) =

Canadian politician

Laura Smith MPP
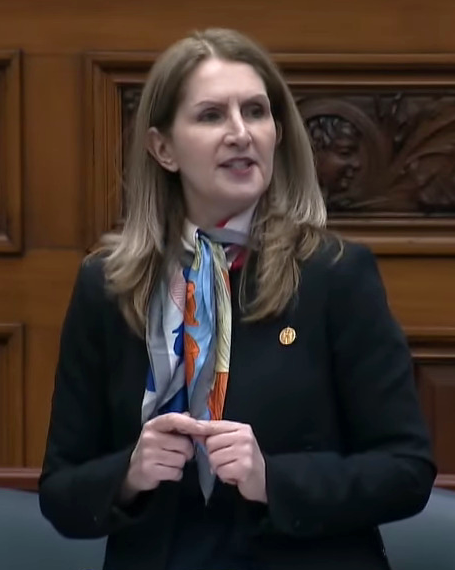
- Smith in 2023

Member of the Ontario Provincial Parliament for Thornhill
- Incumbent
- Assumed office June 2, 2022
- Preceded by: Gila Martow

Personal details
- Party: Progressive Conservative

Laura Smith MPP is a Canadian politician, who was elected to the Legislative Assembly of Ontario in the 2022 provincial election. She represents the riding of Thornhill as a member of the Progressive Conservative Party of Ontario. Smith previously managed a litigation company. She currently serves as the Parliamentary Assistant to the Minister of Municipal Affairs and Housing (Housing).

== Electoral history ==
2025 Ontario general election: Thornhill
Party	Candidate	Votes	%	±%
Progressive Conservative	Laura Smith	22,829	63.99	+10.70
Liberal	Ben Dooley	10,105	28.32	–1.36
New Democratic	Faiz Qureshi	1,282	3.59	–4.22
Green	Marcelo Levy	768	2.15	–1.19
New Blue	Luca Mele	523	1.47	–1.23
Moderate	Aleksei Polyakov	170	0.48	+0.17
Total valid votes		35,677	98.95	
Total rejected, unmarked and declined ballots		378	1.05	+0.19
Turnout		36,055	39.93	+0.05
Eligible voters		90,296		
Progressive Conservative hold		Swing		+6.03
Source: Elections Ontario

2022 Ontario general election: Thornhill
Party	Candidate	Votes	%	±%
Progressive Conservative	Laura Smith	18,395	53.28	–7.84
Liberal	Laura Mirabella	10,247	29.68	+14.90
New Democratic	Jasleen Kambo	2,698	7.82	–11.51
Green	Daniella Mikanovsky	1,155	3.35	+1.14
New Blue	Yakov Zarkhine	931	2.70	–
Ontario Party	Igor Tvorogov	351	1.02	–
Independent	Jacob Joel Ginsberg	261	0.76	–
No Affiliation	Hiten Patel	195	0.56	–
Moderate	Aleksei Polyakov	105	0.30	–0.07
Independent	Brandon Ying	100	0.29	–
Freedom of Choice	Roman Pesis	84	0.24	–
Total valid votes		34,522	99.14	
Total rejected, unmarked and declined ballots		298	0.86	–0.12
Turnout		34,820	39.88	–16.28
Eligible voters		87,313		
Progressive Conservative hold		Swing		–11.37
Source: Elections Ontario
