= Gila Martow =

Canadian politician

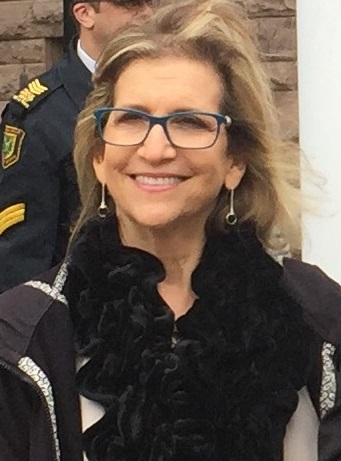

Vaughan City Councillor for Ward 5 Thornhill
- Incumbent
- Assumed office November 15, 2022
- Preceded by: Alan Shefman

Parliamentary Assistant to the Minister of Francophone Affairs
- In office November 29, 2018 – November 23, 2020
- Minister: Caroline Mulroney
- Preceded by: Amanda Simard
- Succeeded by: Natalia Kusendova

Member of the Ontario Provincial Parliament for Thornhill
- In office February 13, 2014 – June 2, 2022
- Preceded by: Peter Shurman
- Succeeded by: Laura Smith

Personal details
- Born: Gila Deborah Gladstone; June 5, 1961 (age 65) Montreal, Quebec, Canada
- Party: Independent (2022-)
- Other political affiliations: Progressive Conservative (2014-2022)
- Education: University of Waterloo School of Optometry and Vision Science
- Occupation: Optometrist

Gila Deborah Gladstone-Martow (née Gladstone; born June 5, 1961) is a politician in Ontario, Canada. She has represented Ward 5 on Vaughan City Council since 2022. She previously represented the electoral district of Thornhill in the Legislative Assembly of Ontario as a member of the Ontario Progressive Conservative Party from 2014 to 2022. Martow did not seek re-election in the 2022 Ontario general election after unsuccessfully seeking the federal Conservative nomination in 2021. Martow returned to municipal politics in her successful election bid in the 2022 Vaughan Municipal Election.

== Background ==
Originally from Chomedey, Quebec, Martow was an optometrist. She and her husband, an ophthalmologist, jointly ran an eye clinic at the Markham Stouffville Hospital.

Martow's maternal grandparents lived on a kibbutz organized by the Hashomer Hatzair Marxist-Zionist youth movement in the early 1930s in Mandatory Palestine (later to become Israel). Martow attended the Socialist Zionist Youth Organization, Camp Shomria, from 1973 to 1977. The camp's Mia Gladstone Art Program is named in memory of Martow's mother.

== Political activism ==
In 2007, she was a spokesperson for the Multi-Faith Coalition. During the provincial election that year, she supported Progressive Conservative leader John Tory's plan to create funding among Ontario’s private faith-based schools. She said, "By not funding non-Catholic faith-based schools, there is going to be social unrest. This is discrimination against non-Catholics."

In 2025, Katherine Grzejszczak; paramedic from York region was fired after criticizing Israel's bombing of Gaza. Martow posted on social media that she contacted Vaughan Mayor Steven Del Duca after seeing Grzejszczak's post:

“On Friday, June 20, I was made aware of a paramedic employed by York Region who had allegedly posted a hateful message on social media," Martow posted on Facebook on June 22.

== Ontario legislature ==
In early 2014, she ran in a by-election in the riding of Thornhill to replace the retiring Peter Shurman. She defeated Liberal candidate Sandra Yeung Racco on February 13, 2014. Four months later she ran again in the 2014 provincial election. She faced Racco again in a rematch. Initially, Racco was declared the winner but the decision was reversed the next day following the official Elections Ontario tally of the vote. Martow was declared the winner by 85 votes. A recount was done and Martow was declared the winner on June 23, 2014, by a margin of 106 votes.

On December 1, 2016, Martow presented a motion in the legislature rejecting the Boycott, Divestment and Sanctions campaign against Israel. It passed by a vote of 49–5 with the governing Liberals, and PCs supporting, and NDP opposing.

In the past, Martow has served as the PC Critic for Intergovernmental Affairs (2014) and as the Anti-Racism Secretariat (2016). She then served in the shadow cabinet as the critic for: Children, Youth, and Families; GTA Issues; and Francophone Affairs until 2018.

After the Progressive Conservatives formed government following the 2018 provincial election, Martow was appointed Parliamentary Assistant to Labour Minister Laurie Scott by Premier Doug Ford. On November 29, 2018, Premier Ford announced that Martow would become the Parliamentary Assistant to the Minister of Francophone Affairs, Caroline Mulroney and that Jane McKenna would take over her position as the Parliamentary Assistant to the Minister of Labour.

In January 2021, she attracted controversy after breaking a COVID-19 lockdown to visit her cottage over Christmas.

=== Failed federal nomination bid and departure ===
In early 2021, Martow ran unsuccessfully for the federal Conservative nomination in Thornhill, where she was defeated by Melissa Lantsman. As a result of announcing her candidacy for the federal nomination, she was required to relinquish her Parliamentary Assistant role in the provincial legislature and was not permitted to run in the 2022 Ontario general election as a Progressive Conservative candidate.

== Municipal politics ==
Martow announced her candidacy for Vaughan City Council in Ward 5 on May 4, 2022, for the 2022 municipal election. Martow previously ran for the same ward in the 2010 municipal election, losing to incumbent Alan Shefman. After Shefman defeated Gila Martow's supported candidates in 2014 (Josh Martow, her son) and 2018 (Allan Goldstein), Martow eventually defeated Shefman in a 2022 rematch. Martow was re-elected to council by acclamation in 2026.

== Election results ==
=== Municipal ===
2026 Vaughan election, Ward 5	Vote	%
Gila Martow (x)	Acclaimed	100%

2022 Vaughan election, Ward 5	Vote	%
Gila Martow	6601	54.56%
Alan Shefman (x)	5497	45.44%

2010 Vaughan election, Ward 5
Candidate	Votes
Alan Shefman (x)	5,561
Gila Martow	4,279
Bernie Green	2,898
Vernon Hendrickson	1,870
Yehuda Shahaf	694
Stellios Missirlis	231

=== Provincial ===
2018 Ontario general election: Thornhill
Party	Candidate	Votes	%	±%
Progressive Conservative	Gila Martow	28,889	61.13	+17.18
New Democratic	Ezra Tanen	9,134	19.33	+11.17
Liberal	Sabi Ahsan	6,985	14.78	-29.00
Green	Rachel Dokhoian	1,043	2.21	-0.27
Libertarian	Mike Holmes	621	1.31	+0.15
None of the Above	Above Znoneofthe	410	0.87	
Moderate	Aleksei Polyakov	177	0.37	
Total valid votes		47,261	100.0	
Progressive Conservative hold		Swing		+13.24
Source: Elections Ontario

2014 Ontario general election
Party	Candidate	Votes	%	±%
Progressive Conservative	Gila Martow	21,886	43.95	-3.94
Liberal	Sandra Yeung Racco	21,780	43.78	+2.18
New Democratic	Cindy Hackelberg	4,052	8.16	+1.37
Green	David Bergart	1,229	2.48	+1.04
Libertarian	Gene Balfour	571	1.16	+0.11
Freedom	Erin Goodwin	233	0.47	-0.08
Total valid votes		50,291	100.0	
Progressive Conservative hold		Swing		-3.06
Source: Elections Ontario

Ontario provincial by-election, February 13, 2014 Resignation of Peter Shurman
Party	Candidate	Votes	%	±%
Progressive Conservative	Gila Martow	13,438	47.67	+0.96
Liberal	Sandra Yeung Racco	11,677	41.43	+0.51
New Democratic	Cindy Hackelberg	1,905	6.75	-2.21
Green	Teresa Pun	404	1.43	-0.25
Libertarian	Gene Balfour	296	1.05	-0.34
Freedom	Erin Goodwin	153	0.54	+0.21
People's Political Party	Kevin Clarke	144	0.51	
Pauper Party of Ontario	John Turmel	47	0.17	
Total valid votes		28,184		
Turnout			27.4%	
Progressive Conservative hold		Swing	+0.34%	
