= Vaughan (provincial electoral district) =

Coordinates: 43.84°N 79.57°W

Ontario electoral district
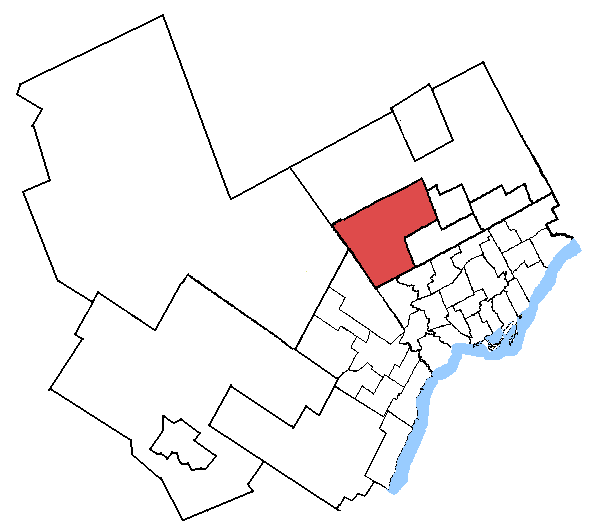
- Vaughan in relation to other Greater Toronto ridings

Defunct provincial electoral district
- Legislature: Legislative Assembly of Ontario
- District created: 2003
- District abolished: 2018
- First contested: 2007
- Last contested: 2014

Demographics
- Population (2006): 154,206
- Electors (2007): 100,066
- Area (km²): 230
- Census division(s): York
- Census subdivision(s): Vaughan

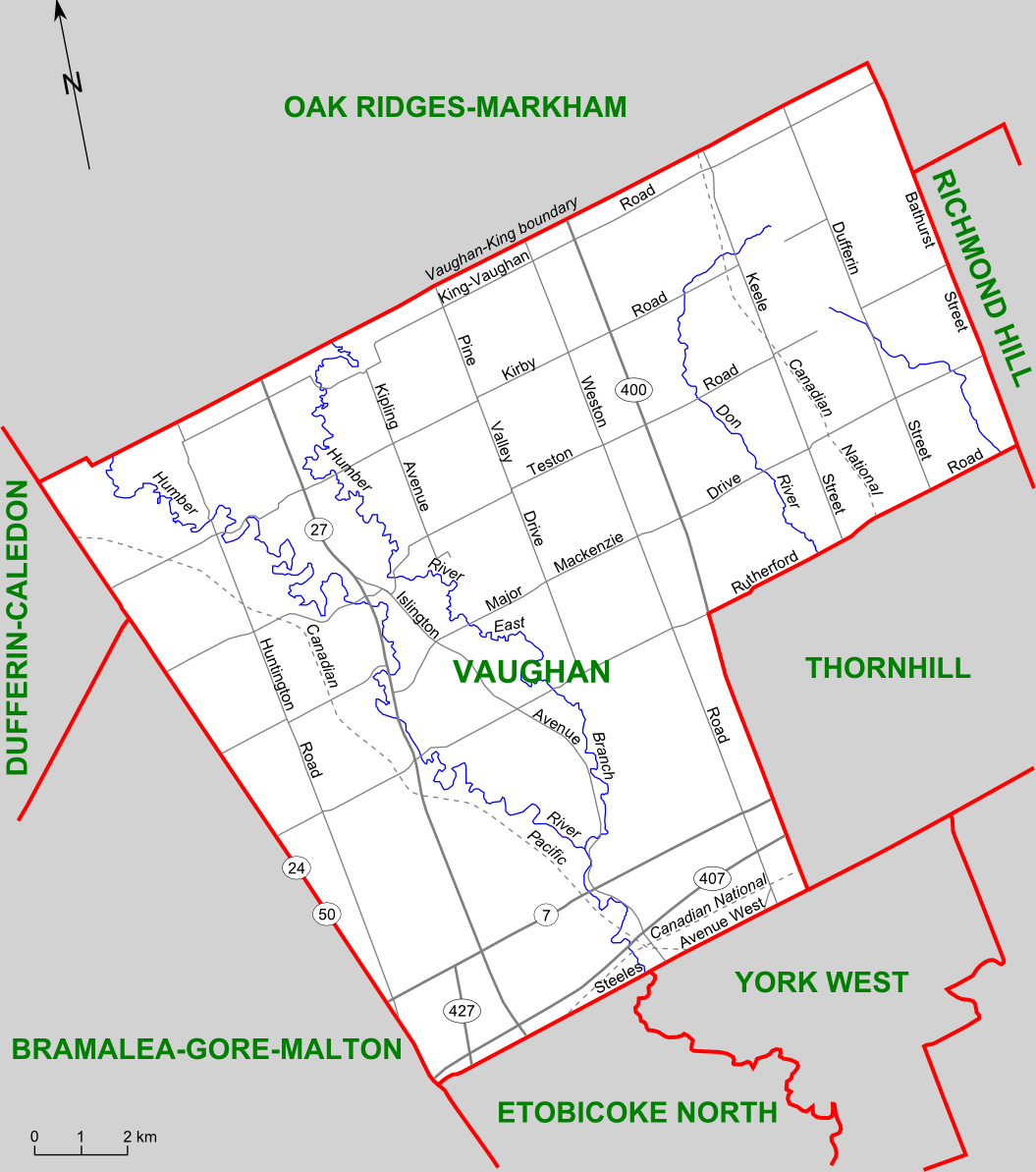
Map of Vaughan riding

Vaughan was a provincial riding in Ontario, Canada, that was represented in the Legislative Assembly of Ontario between 2007 and 2018.

The riding covered the fast-growing region of Vaughan north of Toronto, Ontario.

It consisted of the part of the City of Vaughan that lies west of Highway 400 and north of Rutherford Road.

In 2018, the district was dissolved into Dufferin—Caledon, King—Vaughan and Vaughan—Woodbridge.

== Demographics ==
According to the 2006 Canadian census

Racial groups: 74.3% White, 9.3% South Asian, 2.7% Latin American, 2.5% Black, 2.4% Southeast Asian, 2.4% Chinese, 1.7% West Asian, 1.7% Filipino, 1.0% Arab
Languages: 44.8% English, 0.5% French, 54.6% Other
Religions (2001): 77.0% Catholic, 7.3% Protestant, 2.7% Muslim, 2.6% Christian Orthodox, 2.1% Sikh, 1.6% Hindu, 1.3% Buddhist, 3.9% No religion
Average income: $34,485

== Members of Provincial Parliament ==
Vaughan
Assembly	Years	Member	Party
Riding created
39th	2007–2011	Greg Sorbara	Liberal
40th	2011–2012	Greg Sorbara	Liberal
40th	2012–2014	Steven Del Duca	Liberal
41st	2014–2018	Steven Del Duca	Liberal
Riding dissolved into Dufferin—Caledon, King—Vaughan and Vaughan—Woodbridge

== Election results ==
2014 Ontario general election
Party	Candidate	Votes	%	±%
Liberal	Steven Del Duca	33,545	55.99	+4.62
Progressive Conservative	Peter Meffe	16,654	27.80	-5.49
New Democratic	Marco Coletta	7,105	11.86	+0.48
Green	Matthew Pankhurst	1,336	2.23	+0.47
Libertarian	Paolo Fabrizio	1,277	2.13	+1.19
Total valid votes		59,917	100.0	
Liberal hold		Swing		+5.06
Source: Elections Ontario

Ontario provincial by-election, September 6, 2012 Resignation of Greg Sorbara
Party	Candidate	Votes	%	±%
Liberal	Steven Del Duca	16,469	51.37	-1.65
Progressive Conservative	Tony Genco	10,674	33.29	+2.05
New Democratic	Paul Donofrio	3,647	11.38	+0.05
Green	Paula Conning	564	1.76	+0.35
Libertarian	Paolo Fabrizio	300	0.94	-0.94
Family Coalition	Bart Wysokinski	144	0.45	
Independent	Stephen Tonner	118	0.37	
Freedom	Erin Goodwin	90	0.28	
People's Political Party	Phil Sarazen	54	0.17	
Total valid votes		32,060	100.00	
Total rejected, unmarked and declined ballots		301	0.93	
Turnout		32,361	25.62	
Eligible voters		126,323		
Liberal hold		Swing		-1.85
Source: Elections Ontario

2011 Ontario general election
Party	Candidate	Votes	%	±%
Liberal	Greg Sorbara	26,174	53.02	-8.88
Progressive Conservative	Tony Genco	15,420	31.24	+12.52
New Democratic	Paul Donofrio	5,594	11.33	-0.36
Libertarian	Paolo Fabrizio	929	1.88	
Green	Brendan Frye	694	1.41	-4.95
Reform	David Natale	218	0.44	
Confederation of Regions	Terry Marino	169	0.34	
Independent	Savino Quatela	169	0.34	-0.99
Total valid votes		49,367	100.00	
Total rejected, unmarked and declined ballots		406	0.82	
Turnout		49,773	41.08	-5.23
Eligible voters		121,154		
Liberal hold		Swing		-10.70
Source: Elections Ontario

2007 Ontario general election
Party	Candidate	Votes	%
Liberal	Greg Sorbara	28,964	61.90
Progressive Conservative	Gayani Weerasinghe	8,759	18.72
New Democratic	Rick Morelli	5,470	11.69
Green	Russell Korus	2,975	6.36
Independent	Savino Quatela	623	1.33
Total valid votes		46,791	100.0
Total rejected ballots		584	
Turnout		47,375	46.31
Eligible voters		102,293	–

== 2007 electoral reform referendum ==
2007 Ontario electoral reform referendum
Side	Votes	%
First Past the Post	27,507	61.9
Mixed member proportional	16,960	38.1
Total valid votes	44,467	100.0

== Sources ==
- Elections Ontario Past Election Results
