= Thornhill (provincial electoral district) =

Provincial electoral district in Ontario, Canada

Coordinates: 43.8112°N 79.4236°W

Ontario electoral district
- Thornhill in relation to the other Toronto ridings

Provincial electoral district
- Legislature: Legislative Assembly of Ontario
MPP
Laura Smith
Progressive Conservative
- District created: 1996
- First contested: 1999
- Last contested: 2025

Demographics
- Population (2021): 115,292
- Electors (2025): 90,343
- Area (km²): 63
- Pop. density (per km²): 1,830
- Census division: York
- Census subdivision(s): Markham, Vaughan

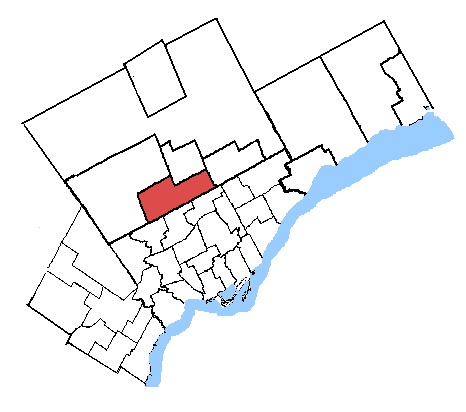
Thornhill 2003 to 2018

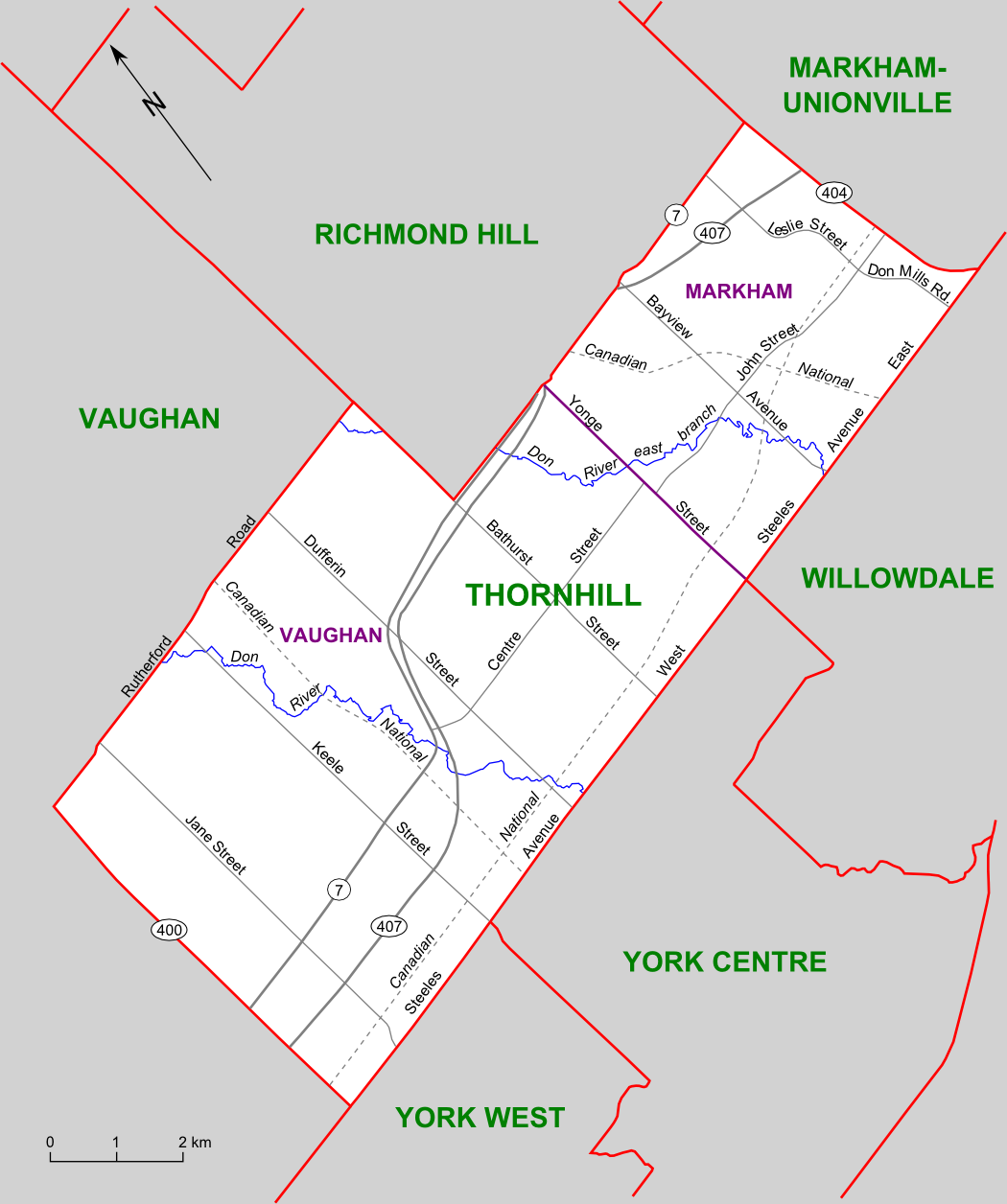
Map of Thornhill riding

Thornhill is a provincial electoral district in Ontario, Canada, that has been represented in the Legislative Assembly of Ontario since 1999. It covers the suburban community of Thornhill, which is made up of portions of the cities of Vaughan and Markham and was created in 1999 from parts of Markham and York Centre ridings.

The riding consists of the part of the city of Vaughan that is east of Highway 400 and south of Rutherford Road, and the part of the city of Markham west of Bayview Avenue.

It is the only riding in Ontario with a Jewish plurality. 32.8% of the population is Jewish, the highest in the province.

== Members of Provincial Parliament ==
Thornhill
Assembly	Years	Member	Party
Riding created from Markham and York Centre
37th	1999–2003	Tina Molinari	Progressive Conservative
38th	2003–2007	Mario Racco	Liberal
39th	2007–2011	Peter Shurman	Progressive Conservative
40th	2011–2013	Peter Shurman	Progressive Conservative
40th	2014–2014	Gila Martow	Progressive Conservative
41st	2014–2018	Gila Martow	Progressive Conservative
42nd	2018–2022	Gila Martow	Progressive Conservative
43rd	2022–2025	Laura Smith	Progressive Conservative
44th	2025–present	Laura Smith	Progressive Conservative

== Election results ==
2025 Ontario general election
Party	Candidate	Votes	%	±%
Progressive Conservative	Laura Smith	22,829	63.99	+10.70
Liberal	Ben Dooley	10,105	28.32	–1.36
New Democratic	Faiz Qureshi	1,282	3.59	–4.22
Green	Marcelo Levy	768	2.15	–1.19
New Blue	Luca Mele	523	1.47	–1.23
Moderate	Aleksei Polyakov	170	0.48	+0.17
Total valid votes		35,677	98.95	
Total rejected, unmarked and declined ballots		378	1.05	+0.19
Turnout		36,055	39.93	+0.05
Eligible voters		90,296		
Progressive Conservative hold		Swing		+6.03
Source: Elections Ontario

2022 Ontario general election
Party	Candidate	Votes	%	±%
Progressive Conservative	Laura Smith	18,395	53.28	–7.84
Liberal	Laura Mirabella	10,247	29.68	+14.90
New Democratic	Jasleen Kambo	2,698	7.82	–11.51
Green	Daniella Mikanovsky	1,155	3.35	+1.14
New Blue	Yakov Zarkhine	931	2.70	–
Ontario Party	Igor Tvorogov	351	1.02	–
Independent	Jacob Joel Ginsberg	261	0.76	–
No Affiliation	Hiten Patel	195	0.56	–
Moderate	Aleksei Polyakov	105	0.30	–0.07
Independent	Brandon Ying	100	0.29	–
Freedom of Choice	Roman Pesis	84	0.24	–
Total valid votes		34,522	99.14	
Total rejected, unmarked and declined ballots		298	0.86	–0.12
Turnout		34,820	39.88	–16.28
Eligible voters		87,313		
Progressive Conservative hold		Swing		–11.37
Source: Elections Ontario

2018 Ontario general election
Party	Candidate	Votes	%	±%
Progressive Conservative	Gila Martow	28,889	61.13	+16.45
New Democratic	Ezra Tanen	9,134	19.33	+11.32
Liberal	Sabi Ahsan	6,985	14.78	–28.50
Green	Rachel Dokhoian	1,043	2.21	–0.18
Libertarian	Mike Holmes	621	1.31	–
None of the Above	Above Znoneofthe	410	0.87	–
Moderate	Aleksei Polyakov	177	0.37	–
Total valid votes		47,259	99.03	
Total rejected, unmarked and declined ballots		465	0.97	
Turnout		47,724	56.16	
Eligible voters		84,979		
Progressive Conservative notional hold		Swing		+2.57
Source: Elections Ontario

2014 general election redistributed results
Party	Vote	%
Progressive Conservative	17,228	44.68
Liberal	16,688	43.28
New Democratic	3,089	8.01
Green	922	2.39
Others	631	1.64

2014 Ontario general election
Party	Candidate	Votes	%	±%
Progressive Conservative	Gila Martow	21,886	43.99	–3.90
Liberal	Sandra Yeung Racco	21,780	43.78	+2.18
New Democratic	Cindy Hackelberg	4,052	8.14	+1.36
Green	David Bergart	1,229	2.47	+1.03
Libertarian	Gene Balfour	571	1.15	+0.09
Freedom	Erin Goodwin	233	0.47	–0.08
Total valid votes		49,751	98.93	
Total rejected, unmarked and declined ballots		540	1.07	+0.63
Turnout		50,291	47.83	+20.48
Eligible voters		105,139		
Progressive Conservative hold		Swing		–3.04
Source: Elections Ontario

Ontario provincial by-election, February 13, 2014 Resignation of Peter Shurman
Party	Candidate	Votes	%	±%
Progressive Conservative	Gila Martow	13,438	47.89	+1.18
Liberal	Sandra Yeung Racco	11,671	41.60	+0.67
New Democratic	Cindy Hackelberg	1,905	6.79	–2.17
Green	Teresa Pun	404	1.44	–0.24
Libertarian	Gene Balfour	296	1.05	–0.33
Freedom	Erin Goodwin	153	0.55	+0.21
People's Political Party	Kevin Clarke	144	0.51	–
Pauper	John Turmel	47	0.17	–
Total valid votes		28,058	99.55	
Total rejected, unmarked and declined ballots		126	0.45	–0.08
Turnout		28,184	27.36	–18.00
Eligible voters		103,021		
Progressive Conservative hold		Swing		+0.26
Source: Elections Ontario

2011 Ontario general election
Party	Candidate	Votes	%	±%
Progressive Conservative	Peter Shurman	20,971	46.71	+0.79
Liberal	Bernie Farber	18,373	40.92	–1.44
New Democratic	Cindy Hackelberg	4,024	8.96	+3.48
Green	Stephanie Nicole Duncan	756	1.68	–3.49
Libertarian	Gene Balfour	623	1.39	–
Freedom	Erin Ashley Gorman	149	0.33	+0.04
Total valid votes		44,896	99.47	
Total rejected, unmarked and declined ballots		239	0.53	–0.18
Turnout		45,135	45.35	–6.82
Eligible voters		99,517		
Progressive Conservative hold		Swing		+1.11
Source: Elections Ontario

2007 Ontario general election
Party	Candidate	Votes	%	±%
Progressive Conservative	Peter Shurman	22,244	45.92	+0.76
Liberal	Mario Racco	20,519	42.36	–4.54
New Democratic	Sandra Parrott	2,657	5.49	–0.24
Green	Lloyd Helferty	2,507	5.18	+3.63
Family Coalition	Nathan Kidd	214	0.44	–
Independent	Malcolm Kojokaro	158	0.33	–
Freedom	Lindsay G. King	142	0.29	–0.37
Total valid votes		48,441	99.29	
Total rejected, unmarked and declined ballots		345	0.71	+0.07
Turnout		48,786	52.17	–5.61
Eligible voters		93,513		
Progressive Conservative gain from Liberal		Swing		+2.65
Source: Elections Ontario

2003 Ontario general election
Party	Candidate	Votes	%	±%
Liberal	Mario Racco	21,419	46.90	–0.46
Progressive Conservative	Tina Molinari	20,623	45.16	–3.05
New Democratic	Laurie Orrett	2,616	5.73	+2.19
Green	Bridget Haworth	705	1.54	+0.66
Freedom	Lindsay G. King	304	0.67	–
Total valid votes		45,667	99.37	
Total rejected, unmarked and declined ballots		291	0.63	–0.21
Turnout		45,958	57.78	–0.91
Eligible voters		79,546		
Liberal gain from Progressive Conservative		Swing		+1.29
Source: Elections Ontario

1999 Ontario general election
Party	Candidate	Votes	%
Progressive Conservative	Tina Molinari	19,580	48.21
Liberal	Dan Ronen	19,237	47.36
New Democratic	Nathan David Rotman	1,438	3.54
Green	Ruth von Bezold	360	0.89
Total valid votes		40,615	99.16
Total rejected, unmarked and declined ballots		344	0.84
Turnout		40,959	58.69
Eligible voters		69,789	
Progressive Conservative pickup new district.			
Source: Elections Ontario

== 2007 electoral reform referendum ==
2007 Ontario electoral reform referendum
Side	Votes	%
First Past the Post	29,007	62.2
Mixed member proportional	17,659	37.8
Total valid votes	46,666	100.0

== See also ==
- List of Ontario provincial electoral districts
- Canadian provincial electoral districts
