= Teresa Armstrong =

Canadian politician

Teresa Armstrong MPP
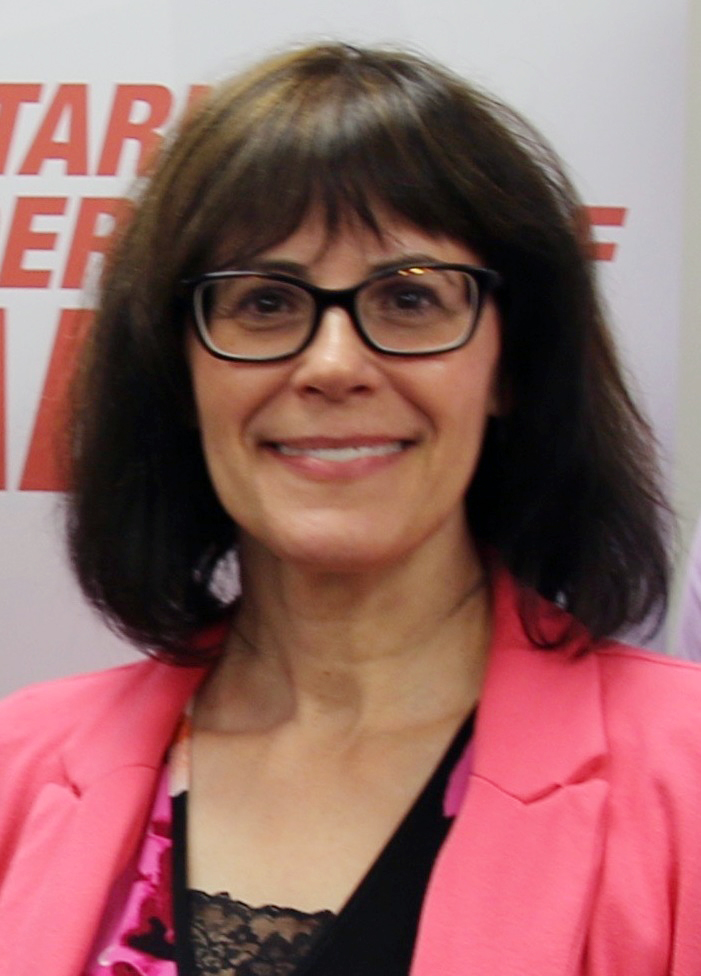
- Armstrong in 2018

Critic, Affordability and Pensions
- Incumbent
- Assumed office July 13, 2022
- Leader: Peter Tabuns (interim)

Critic, Home Care and Long Term Care
- In office August 23, 2018 – June 2, 2022
- Leader: Andrea Horwath

Critic, Citizenship, Immigration and International Trade; and Seniors Affairs
- In office June 25, 2014 – June 7, 2018
- Leader: Andrea Horwath

Member of the Ontario Provincial Parliament for London—Fanshawe
- Incumbent
- Assumed office October 6, 2011
- Preceded by: Khalil Ramal

Personal details
- Born: 1966 (age 59–60)
- Party: New Democratic
- Occupation: Insurance broker

Teresa Armstrong (born 1966) is a politician in Ontario, Canada. She is a New Democratic member of the Legislative Assembly of Ontario who was elected in the 2011 election. She represents the riding of London—Fanshawe.

== Background ==
Armstrong lives in London, Ontario with her husband Bill. Armstrong has two children and three grandchildren. Bill Armstrong was a former city councillor in London.

== Politics ==
In 2011, Armstrong ran as the NDP candidate in the riding of London—Fanshawe. She defeated Liberal incumbent Khalil Ramal by 4,275 votes. She was re-elected in the 2014 election defeating Progressive Conservative candidate Chris Robson by 9,707 votes.

Within the Ontario NDP caucus, Armstrong has championed senior's interests. She was the party's critic for Citizenship, Immigration and International Trade and for Senior's Issues between 2014 and 2018. After the 2018 Ontario general election her critic portfolio encompassed home care and long term care. After the 2022 election, interim leader Peter Tabuns named Armstrong the party's critic on affordability and pensions. As of August 11, 2024, she serves as the Official Opposition critic for Child Care and Pensions.

== Electoral record ==
2025 Ontario general election: London—Fanshawe
Party	Candidate	Votes	%	±%	Expenditures
New Democratic	Teresa Armstrong	18,749	47.59	+0.53	$36,830
Progressive Conservative	Pete Vanderley	13,480	34.21	+1.45	$52,737
Liberal	Kevin May	4,884	12.40	+2.03	$13,998
Green	William Osbourne-Sorrell	1,045	2.65	–0.85	$1,424
New Blue	Christopher West	654	1.66	–1.47	$0
Freedom	Dave Durnin	381	0.97	+0.24	$0
Independent	Alan John McDonald	205	0.52	–	$0
Total valid votes/expense limit		39,398	99.39	–	$154,647
Total rejected, unmarked and declined ballots		242	0.61	–0.05	
Turnout		39,640	41.27	+4.71	
Eligible voters		96,054			
New Democratic hold		Swing		+0.99	
Source: Elections Ontario

2022 Ontario general election: London—Fanshawe
Party	Candidate	Votes	%	±%	Expenditures
New Democratic	Teresa Armstrong	16,123	47.06	–8.62	$98,540
Progressive Conservative	Jane Kovarikova	11,224	32.76	+2.98	$94,579
Liberal	Zeba Hashmi	3,553	10.37	+2.01	$38,320
Green	Zack Ramsey	1,200	3.50	–1.01	$0
New Blue	Adriana A. Medina	1,072	3.13	–	$3,647
Ontario Party	Doug Macdonald	539	1.57	–	$780
Freedom	Dave Durnin	248	0.72	+0.23	$0
None of the Above	Stephen R. Campbell	201	0.59	–0.10	$0
Consensus Ontario	T. Paul Plumb	100	0.29	–	$0
Total valid votes/expense limit		34,260	99.34	–	$132,738
Total rejected, unmarked and declined ballots		228	0.66	–0.43	
Turnout		34,488	36.56	–13.10	
Eligible voters		94,342			
New Democratic hold		Swing		–5.80	
Source: Elections Ontario

2018 Ontario general election: London—Fanshawe
Party	Candidate	Votes	%	±%
New Democratic	Teresa Armstrong	25,272	55.68	+5.26
Progressive Conservative	Eric Weniger	13,519	29.78	+6.70
Liberal	Lawvin Hadisi	3,797	8.37	-11.53
Green	Lisa Carriere	2,050	4.52	+0.64
None of the Above	Stephen R. Campbell	312	0.69	
Freedom	Rob Small	223	0.49	-0.83
Libertarian	Henryk Szymczyszyn	218	0.48	-0.61
Total valid votes		45,391	98.90	+0.23
Total rejected, unmarked and declined ballots		503	1.10	-0.23
Turnout		45,894	49.65	+3.23
Eligible voters		92,428		
Source: Elections Ontario

2014 Ontario general election: London—Fanshawe
Party	Candidate	Votes	%	±%
New Democratic	Teresa Armstrong	17,903	50.42	+9.65
Progressive Conservative	Chris Robson	8,196	23.08	-3.44
Liberal	Marcel Marcellin	7,066	19.90	-8.38
Green	Wil Sorrell	1,378	3.88	+1.39
Freedom	Paul McKeever	467	1.32	+0.87
Libertarian	Tim Harnick	386	1.09	+0.16
Independent	Ali Aref Hamadi	112	0.32	-0.24
Total valid votes		35,508	98.67	-0.70
Total rejected, unmarked and declined ballots		478	1.33	+0.70
Turnout		35,986	46.42	-0.60
Eligible voters		77,524		
New Democratic hold		Swing		+6.54
Source: Elections Ontario

2011 Ontario general election: London—Fanshawe
Party	Candidate	Votes	%	±%
New Democratic	Teresa Armstrong	13,953	40.77	+14.53
Liberal	Khalil Ramal	9,678	28.28	-10.48
Progressive Conservative	Cheryl Miller	9,075	26.52	-0.95
Green	Bassam Lazar	852	2.49	-4.69
Libertarian	Tim Harnick	320	0.93	
Independent	Ali Hamadi	192	0.56	
Freedom	Dave Durnin	155	0.45	
Total valid votes		34,225	99.37	
Total rejected, unmarked and declined ballots		218	0.63	
Turnout		34,443	45.82	
Eligible voters		75,165		
New Democratic gain from Liberal		Swing		+12.51
Source: Elections Ontario
