= Peter Shurman =

Canadian politician

Member of the Ontario Provincial Parliament for Thornhill
- In office 10 October 2007 – 31 December 2013
- Preceded by: Mario Racco
- Succeeded by: Gila Martow

Personal details
- Born: Peter Emil Shurman; 18 November 1947 (age 79) Montreal, Quebec
- Party: Progressive Conservative
- Spouse: Carole Shurman (m. 1971-present)
- Children: 2
- Education: Sir George Williams University
- Occupation: Broadcaster, entrepreneur

Peter Emil Shurman (born 18 November 1947) is a former politician in Ontario, Canada. He was a Progressive Conservative member of the Legislative Assembly of Ontario from 2007 to 2013 who represented the riding of Thornhill. Prior to his time in the legislature, he was a radio talk show host on CFRB in Toronto.

== Broadcasting career ==
Peter Emil Shurman was born in Montreal, Quebec, and is Jewish. He attended Sir George Williams University, now Concordia University. He apprenticed in communications with Standard Broadcasting, holding various positions with the company's Montreal AM and FM stations, CJAD and CJFM, including general manager. Starting out in technical maintenance, progressing through a number of positions including program announcing, reporting, sales, and management. He moved to Toronto in 1983 and eventually rising through the ranks to become Standard Broadcasting's President of Radio at age 36.

Shurman left Standard Broadcasting in 1987. His activities immediately thereafter included buying 14 radio stations for a total of $22.5 million in less than one year for third parties; undertaking an assignment to grow a minor Toronto paging company, into one of the area's largest and most important operators in only eighteen months; applying for an FM radio licence in Toronto in 1990. When the licence was not granted, he purchased an ailing telephone answering service, The Receptionists Ltd., and renamed it Universal TeleResponse Corporation (UTR). UTR became a multimillion-dollar enterprise handling 7x24 communications for FP/Fortune 500 companies. After 22 years in the radio broadcasting business, Shurman became CEO and principal shareholder of Universal TeleResponse Corporation (UTR), a major call centre in North Toronto.

In 2003, Shurman sold UTR and remained for one year as part of the sale agreement before returning to broadcasting. He was a talk radio host for CFRB until announcing his intention to run in the 2007 Ontario provincial election.

== Politics ==
In 2007, Shurman ran for the Progressive Conservative nomination for the riding of Thornhill and was challenged by Norm Gardner. John Tory, the party leader at the time requested that Gardner step aside for Shurman. Shurman then successfully campaigned as a Progressive Conservative candidate in the 2007 Ontario general election becoming the MPP for the riding of Thornhill. His election provided focus for the issue surrounding public funding of private faith-based schools, a major issue in Thornhill which has a large Jewish (35%) population.

Towards the end of 2008, York University (a university that is close to Shurman's political riding) was effectively shut down due to a call for a strike by Canadian Union of Public Employees Local 3903. Shurman became involved with a student anti-strike group, York Not Hostage.

Shurman subsequently brought a resolution to the floor of the Ontario Legislative Assembly condemning Israeli Apartheid Week on Ontario campuses. The resolution, debated in late February 2010, passed unanimously. Shurman also co-sponsored two private member's bills with Liberal and NDP members. One proclaimed May as Jewish Heritage Month in Ontario and the other created Italian Heritage Month in the province every June. Both of these bills became law and the affected communities celebrate annually.

During his tenure he served as the Opposition Critic for Economic Development & Trade, Francophone Affairs and was Vice-Chair of the Legislature's Standing Committee on Public Accounts. He served as PC Caucus Finance Critic until 8 September 2013 when he was removed from the position after a "heated exchange" with party leader Tim Hudak in which Shurman refused to repay a housing allowance he had received for a Toronto apartment. It was later reported that Shurman had proposed to Hudak that he run in a Niagara area riding, in or near his new home, in the 2011 provincial election but Hudak insisted he run in Thornhill because he was concerned that the seat would otherwise be lost. In the October 2011 election, Shurman ran and held his Thornhill seat against a challenge by former Canadian Jewish Congress CEO Bernie Farber, running as the Ontario Liberal Party candidate.

In December 2013, leaks to media suggested an impending resignation would be tendered by Shurman. Shurman received a letter dated 3 December and delivered by hand to his office on 8 December by senior staff of Progressive Conservative leader, Tim Hudak. The letter admonished Shurman for claiming mileage from his Niagara-on-the-Lake home to Toronto as an expense. Shurman announced that he would resign his seat effective 31 December. In a letter to his constituents, he said, "The decision is entirely my own and results from lengthy reflection and discussion with family... I have concluded that continuing with my political career would be a mistake for me."

Peter Shurman continued to reside in Niagara-on-the-Lake until 2018 and now makes his home in midtown Toronto. He is engaged in business and political consulting activities and talk radio broadcasting. He appeared regularly on Global News Radio 640 Toronto as a fill-in host until October 2021.
