= 2020 Ontario Liberal Party leadership election =

Canadian provincial party leader election

- March 7, 2020
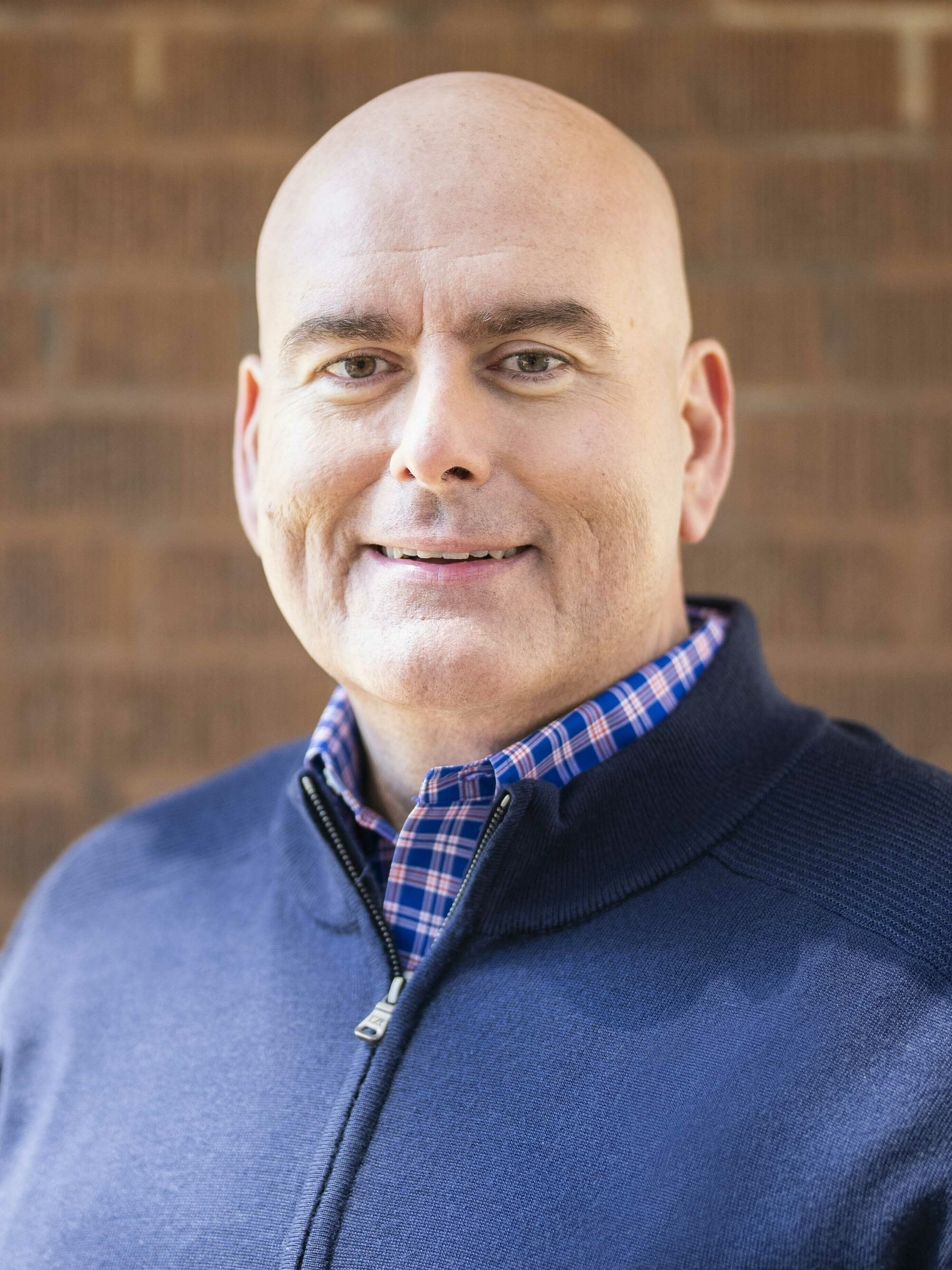

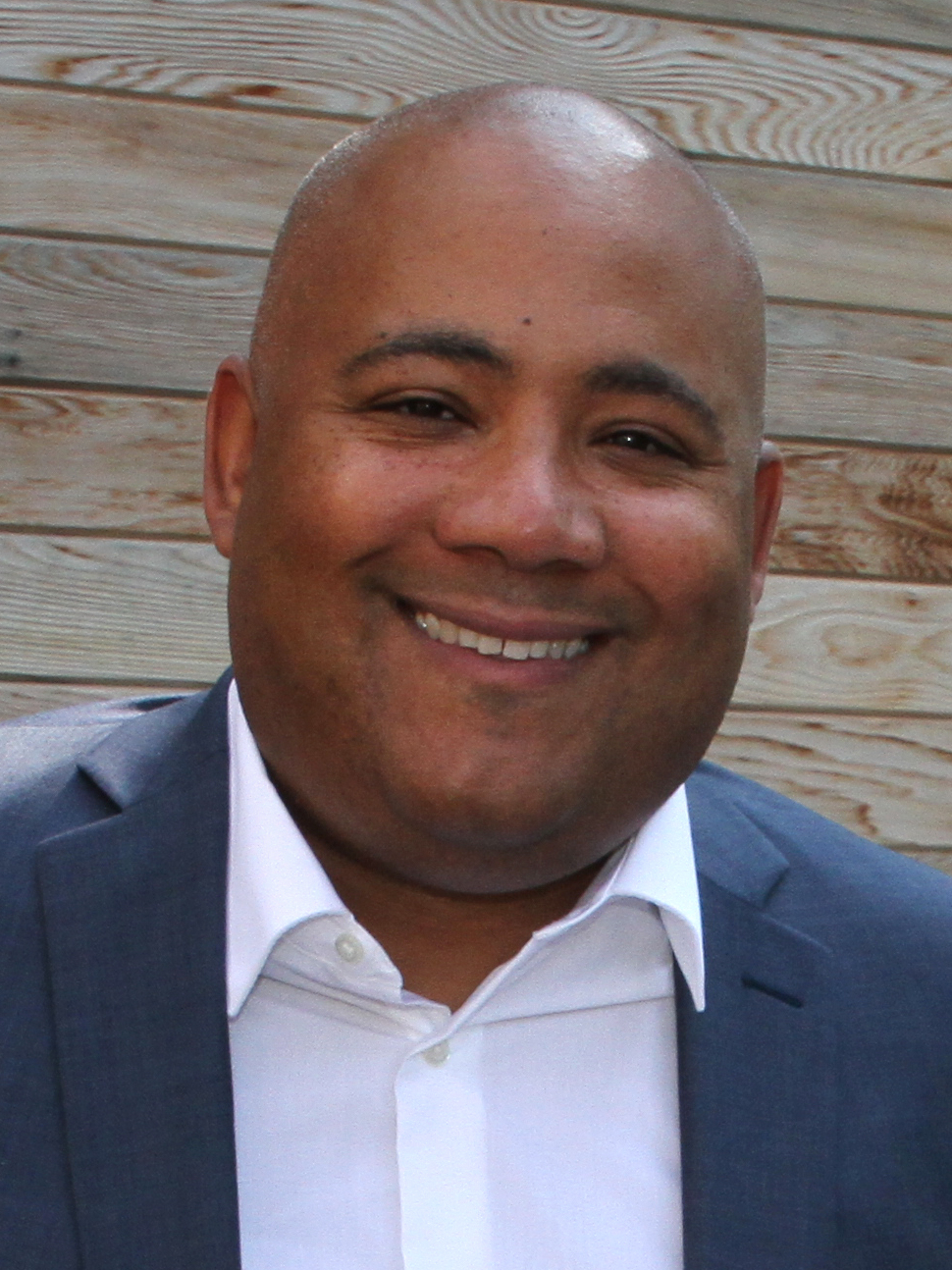

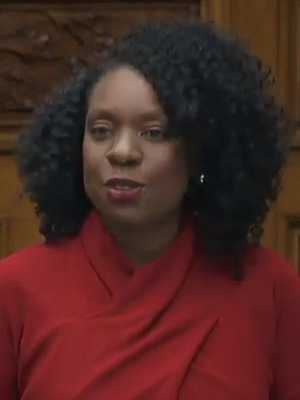
Candidate	Steven Del Duca	Michael Coteau
First ballot	1,258 (58.79%)	363 (16.96%)
Pledged delegates	1,172 (56.24%)	370 (17.75%)
	KG
Candidate	Kate Graham	Mitzie Hunter
First ballot	299 (13.97%)	122 (5.70%)
Pledged delegates	273 (13.10%)	130 (6.24%)
Leader before election
John Fraser (interim)
Elected Leader
Steven Del Duca

2020 Ontario Liberal Party leadership election
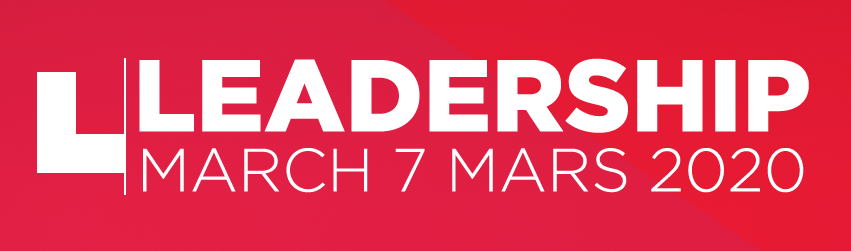
- Date: March 7, 2020
- Convention: International Centre, Mississauga, Ontario
- Resigning leader: Kathleen Wynne
- Won by: Steven Del Duca
- Ballots: 1
- Candidates: 6
- Entrance fee: $100,000 ($75,000 non-refundable)
- Spending limit: $900,000

The 2020 Ontario Liberal Party leadership election concluded on March 7, 2020, resulting in the election of Steven Del Duca, a former cabinet minister in the government of Kathleen Wynne, as Ontario Liberal Party’s 33rd leader.

The leadership election took place following the resignation of Kathleen Wynne after over five years at the helm of the party. Her resignation took place on the evening of June 7, 2018, after the majority government led by her was defeated in the 2018 election and the party lost official party status.

The leadership election featured six candidates: former cabinet ministers Del Duca, Michael Coteau, and Mitzie Hunter, former provincial election candidates Kate Graham and Alvin Tedjo, and political newcomer Brenda Hollingsworth. The election was concluded with a delegated convention that took place March 6–7, 2020 at the International Centre in Mississauga.

== Background ==
=== Lead up to the 2018 election ===
After securing an upset leadership victory in 2013, Kathleen Wynne won a fourth consecutive mandate for the Ontario Liberal Party in June 2014 by marketing herself as a fresh face for the Liberals who would distance the party from Dalton McGuinty. However, the Liberals' standing with voters was badly hurt when Wynne’s government partially privatized Hydro One in 2015, after campaigning against it in the 2014 election, as well as rising criticism over "ballooning provincial debt, high electricity prices and costly, politically expedient decisions". The party headed into the 2018 election campaign trailing far behind the Progressive Conservatives. In the two years leading up to the 2018 campaign, the Liberals trailed the Progressive Conservatives in all but three of the more than eighty opinion polls published.

With the party’s electoral fortune declining, there were public calls for Wynne’s resignation as early as spring 2017, most notably from former finance minister and campaign chair Greg Sorbara (under whom Wynne served as campaign vice-chair in 2011). Wynne consistently resisted the calls. Throughout the 2018 election campaign, the Liberals polled consistently in third place behind not only the Progressive Conservatives but also the New Democrats. CBC's poll tracker projected zero to two seats (out of 124) for the Liberals at multiple points of the election campaign.

At the conclusion of the campaign, the Liberals elected only seven MPPs, losing official party status in the Legislature. It was the worst electoral result in the party's 161-year history and the worst result for any incumbent governing party in Ontario. On the night of the election, Wynne announced her resignation as party leader, while continuing to sit in the legislature as MPP for Don Valley West.

=== Interim leader ===
Wynne announced on election night that she had asked the party president to begin the process of choosing an interim leader. According to the party's constitution, an interim leader is to be selected by a vote of the party caucus, the presidents of riding associations without an elected Liberal MPPs and party executive members. With four of the remaining seven caucus members actively contemplating leadership bids, one being in poor health, and one being the outgoing leader, the Liberal caucus quickly endorsed the seventh member, Ottawa South MPP John Fraser, to serve as interim leader on June 13, 2018. Fraser assumed the office of interim leader on June 14, following a ratification vote of party executives and presidents of riding associations for the remaining 117 ridings that do not have a Liberal MPP.

=== Rules and procedures ===
Under the procedure outlined by the party's constitution, all members of the Ontario Liberal Party are eligible to cast a two-part ballot at one of the "Leadership Election Meetings" held across the province. Members vote directly for their choice of leadership candidate (or for "independent") in the top part of the ballot, and for local delegates for the leadership convention in the bottom part of the ballot. Elected delegates were apportioned to leadership candidates based on their share of votes in the top part of the ballot, and are bounded to vote for their leadership candidates on the first ballot at the leadership convention. The small number of independent delegates elected can vote for whomever they chose at the convention.

The delegates of the leadership convention made up of approximately 2000 elected delegates (16 delegates elected by members from each of the 124 electoral districts, 8 delegates from each Ontario Young Liberals campus clubs, 1 delegate from each Ontario Women Liberals Commission clubs) and more than 500 ex-officio delegates (by virtue of party and elected offices they have held, such as sitting and former Liberal MPPs, recent provincial Liberal candidates, sitting federal Liberal MPs, and various party officials and representatives of party bodies). Balloting at convention continues until one candidate receives a majority of ballots cast.

At the party's Annual General Meeting held on June 8, 2019, an organized attempt was made to amend the party constitution to change the leadership election system to eliminate the delegated convention and adopted a weighted One Member One Vote point system similar to the ones used by the Progressive Conservatives and the federal Liberal Party. The amendment was supported by 57% of delegates, but failed to receive the two-thirds majority required for it to pass.

The 2020 leadership election marked the last time that this system was used, as a weighted one member one vote point system was adopted by the party in 2023.

== Leadership campaign ==
=== Early campaigning ===
Given the weak polling numbers during the final years of the Wynne government, there was frequent chatter about the leadership aspirations of various cabinet members and MPPs. The names most frequently discussed were of finance minister Charles Sousa, health minister Eric Hoskins (both 2013 leadership contenders), Attorney General Yasir Naqvi (party president at the time of the 2013 leadership election), transport minister Steven Del Duca (co-chair of the 2013 leadership convention), and backbench MPP Yvan Baker.

With Sousa, Del Duca, Naqvi and Baker all losing their seats and Hoskins leaving provincial politics, the likely slate of candidates became uncertain after the 2018 election. In the latter half of 2018, four former ministers who survived the election, Michael Coteau, Mitzie Hunter, Marie-France Lalonde, and Nathalie Des Rosiers, actively explored their candidacies, while the candidacies of Del Duca, Naqvi, and Baker continued to be frequently speculated. Baker and Lalonde later opted to seek federal seats (both successful). Des Rosiers left politics to become principal of Massey College, while Naqvi became CEO of Institute for Canadian Citizenship. Del Duca briefly sought the chair-ship of York Region until the election was cancelled by the Ford government. Adam Vaughan and Mark Holland, two relatively high-profile MPs, both publicly acknowledged that they contemplated and subsequently ruled out bids, opting to seek re-election federally.

=== Formal campaign ===
Like all leadership contests that end at a convention, this contest consisted of three distinct campaign phases:

1. Membership recruitment, the period up to membership cutoff ended on December 2, 2019
2. Persuasion and members voting, the public campaigning period prior to members voting on February 8-9, 2020
3. Convention, the final phase culminating to the convention on March 7, 2020

On April 3, 2019, Del Duca formally declared his candidacy, the first candidate to do so. This was prior to the party’s annual general meeting in June where amendment proposals to the leadership rules were being debated. Del Duca refrained from taking positions on any of the amendment proposals, citing perceived conflict of interests. Alvin Tedjo, a former political aide and provincial election candidate, declared his candidacy in late May. An organized “draft Chris Hadfield” movement was present at the party’s annual meeting, even though the former astronaut at no point expressed any inclination to enter politics.

Following the annual meeting, the party announced that it would formally “call” the leadership contest (a legal requirement imposed by the legislation) on July 18, 2019, that candidate registration deadline would be on November 25, 2019, and that the contest would conclude at a convention on March 7, 2020. It also announced an entrance fee of $100,000 (including $25,000 refundable deposit) and a spending limit of $900,000.

Coteau announced his candidacy soon after the party’s annual meeting in June, while Hunter formally joined the race in early August. Kate Graham, a university instructor and former provincial election candidate, joined the race in September. Kyle Peterson, outgoing MP for Newmarket-Aurora, and Arthur Potts, a former MPP, both commenced bids in the fall of 2019, but ended their bids prior to formally launching their campaigns. Ottawa lawyer Brenda Hollingsworth, a political newcomer, joined the race on the registration deadline, rounding out the field of six.

The party organized six debates among the candidates, held in Guelph (December 8), Windsor (December 12), Ottawa (January 20), Sudbury (January 30), Markham (February 1) and Toronto (February 24). All six debates were livestreamed on the party’s website. In addition, the Empire Club of Canada hosted a debate on January 15, and TVO hosted a televised debate on February 19.

The party imposed membership cut-off for voting eligibility for December 2, 2019. At the cut-off, Del Duca claimed to have recruited 14,173 members while Coteau, Hunter and Tedjo claimed 8500, 2000 and 1000 respectively. The party later disclosed that 37,831 members in total were eligible to vote.

Del Duca was seen as the frontrunner throughout the campaign. It was generally agreed that he had the most robust ground organization and most experienced campaign team. He also received by-far the largest share of endorsements from elected and party officials, with more public endorsements from former and current MPPs and MPs than the other five candidates combined. Coteau, with the longest tenure in the legislature and cabinet, pitched himself as the primary rival to Del Duca, and was generally viewed as seeking to reform the party. Graham, a political newcomer who campaigned to “change how we do politics”, also put forward a competitive campaign with the endorsements of former Deputy Premier Deb Matthews and a number other prominent figures seen as close to Wynne.

=== Local voting ===
All members of the Ontario Liberal Party as of December 2, 2019 were eligible to cast a two-part ballot at one of the "Leadership Election Meetings" held across the province over the weekend of February 8–9, 2020. Results were tallied at the local constituency association level. Del Duca’s frontrunner status was cemented at the end of the members voting weekend, having secured 56% of the elected delegates, won the most votes in 89 of 124 constituencies, and led delegate counts in all regions of the province. Coteau and Graham were in distant second and third places, earning 18% and 13% of the delegate respectively. With strong second place showing in Southwestern Ontario (which voted on Saturday of the weekend), Graham actually led Coteau on delegate count after the first day of voting. Coteau re-gained second place by the end of the weekend, with stronger showing in Toronto and Eastern Ontario (which voted on Sunday).

The meetings were held by 119 constituency associations (with five additional constituency associations in Northern Ontario with membership spread out in vast geography holding their balloting by mail/email/fax), twelve Ontario Young Liberal campus clubs and four Ontario Women's Liberal Clubs. Members vote directly for their choice of leadership candidate (or for "independent") in the top part of the ballot, and for local delegates in the bottom part of the ballot. Elected delegates were apportioned to leadership candidates based on their share of votes in the top part of the ballot, and are bounded to vote for their leadership candidates on the first ballot at the March 6 convention. The small number of independent delegates elected can vote for whomever they chose at the convention.

In total, there were a total of 2,084 delegates spots up for election from Ontario's 124 electoral districts (16 each for a total of 1,984), twelve campus clubs (8 each for a total of 96) and four women's clubs (1 each for a total of 4). Ballot counts were held locally immediately after close of voting in the evening.

On Saturday February 8, balloting were held for the associations located in regions west of Toronto from Peel Region to Windsor and for associations in northern Ontario with membership concentrated in urban centres. While Del Duca's generally presumed status as the frontrunner was confirmed by the end of that day, Saturday results nonetheless delivered some surprises. With overwhelming dominance in Peel Region (sweeping all 16 delegates in two constituencies, which required at least 96.9% of the votes cast in the constituency to achieve), and many decisive majority victories in Hamilton-Wentworth, Niagara, Waterloo and Windsor-Essex regions and the four larger cities in the North, Del Duca opened up an unexpectedly staggering lead on the first day, securing more than 60% of the approximately 900 delegate spots up for grab that day. While it was understood that Graham had home court advantage on the first day, her strong second place finish along with the anemic results posted by the two sitting Toronto MPPs, came as surprises to many. Graham resoundingly won all five electoral districts in and immediately surrounding her home base London, along with majority victories in Chatham-Kent and Burlington (fueled by endorsements from former local MPPs Pat Hoy and Eleanor McMahon respectively) and the rural Kitchener constituency. While Coteau was expected to perform stronger in regions voting on Sunday, his campaign underperformed even the low expectation. Despite being backed by six former MPPs from the voting regions (including former party leader Bob Nixon, former deputy prime minister Sheila Copps, and three other former ministers), Coteau posted no victories on the first day and allowed Graham to open up a 50 delegate leads on him.

On Sunday February 9, balloting were held in Toronto and regions to the east and north of the city. Del Duca continued to post wins in all regions, but not with the dominance seen on the day prior (he did post a third sweep, in his own Vaughan constituency), securing just shy of 50% of the approximately 1100 delegate spots being contested that day. He also secure zero delegates in three rural constituencies in Eastern Ontario, a fate his campaign avoided in all other constituencies (compared to Coteau in seventeen and Graham in 38 constituencies). Coteau regained his running-up status, posting convincing wins close to his home base in North York and Scarborough, all three Kingston constituencies, along with a handful of other constituencies. He was also competitive with Del Duca in a good number of constituencies in Toronto, Ottawa, Simcoe, and even a number of constituencies in Del Duca's home base of York Region. Graham was competitive in selected constituencies in downtown Toronto, central Ottawa, and a handful others. Hunter secured a convincing win in her own constituency, but did not win more than three delegates (approx 20% of the votes) in any other constituency. Hollingworth won the vote count in her home constituency of Ottawa West, tying Del Duca in delegate count there.

=== Convention ===
The delegated leadership convention was held on March 6 and 7, 2020 at the International Centre in Mississauga.

In addition to the elected pledged delegates, approximately 530 individuals were entitled to ex officio delegate status by virtue of party and elected offices they have held, such as sitting and former Liberal MPPs, recent provincial Liberal candidates, sitting federal Liberal MPs, and various party officials and representatives of party bodies. Accordingly, the convention could have a maximum of just over 2,600 voting delegates.

However, a significant portion of the ex officio delegates were not expected to exercise that right, and some attrition were always expected, especially among the delegates pledged to contestants with no viable path of victory. Therefore, having secured 1,172 elected delegates, Del Duca essentially have secured the leadership by the end of the members voting phase barring some major upset.

Despite the outcome of the leadership election being a virtual certainty leading up to the convention, about 3,000 people attended the two-day event, co-chaired by Deputy Prime Minister Chrystia Freeland and interim leader John Fraser. On March 7, 2020, Del Duca was formally elected leader on the first ballot, with 59% of the ballot cast.

== Registered candidates ==
=== Steven Del Duca ===
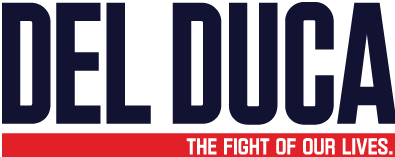
Steven Del Duca campaign logo

Steven Del Duca is the former MPP for Vaughan (2012–2018), former minister of Economic Development and Growth (2018) and minister of Transportation (2014–2018).

Date announced: April 3, 2019
Date registered with Elections Ontario: July 19, 2019
Campaign website: www.stevendelduca.ca
Members signed up: 14,173
Contributions received: $631,109.35
Campaign expenditures: $645,161.00
Endorsements: Del Duca was endorsed by Michael Gravelle, the most senior current member of caucus, and essentially the only caucus endorsement up for grab. He was also endorsed by most of the fellow former MPPs who served in the McGuinty-Wynne era (endorsed by 34 former MPPs in total, out of 53 who made public endorsements), and most of the sitting federal MPs from Ontario (endorsed by 22 incumbent Liberal MPs from Ontario, out of 30 who made public endorsements along with 11 former MPs). Among his endorsers was a future PC cabinet member, then Milton Town Councillor Zee Hamid.

=== Michael Coteau ===
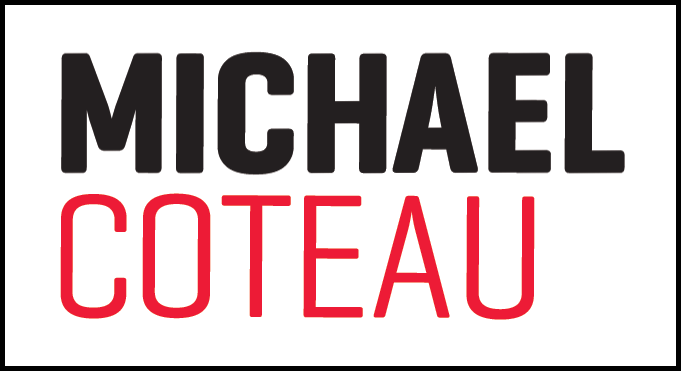
Michael Coteau campaign logo

Michael Coteau is the MPP for Don Valley East (since 2011) and Liberal critic for Economic Development, Labour, Energy, and Infrastructure; former minister of Community and Social Services (2018), minister of Children and Youth Services and minister responsible for anti-racism (2016–2018), minister of Tourism, Culture and Sport and minister responsible for the 2015 Pan American Games and Parapan Games (2014–2016), and minister of Citizenship and Immigration (2013–2014); former Toronto District School Board trustee for Ward 17 (2003–11); former small business owner and national nonprofit CEO.

Date announced: June 16, 2019
Date registered with Elections Ontario: July 24, 2019
Campaign website: www.michaelcoteau.com
Members signed up: 8,500
Contributions received: $318,367.00
Campaign expenditures: $334,200.00
Endorsements: Coteau claimed the second longest list of endorsements, with nine former MPPs (six of them having served under Peterson's leadership in the 1980s), six current MPs (including one Quebec MP) and six former MPs, and more than a dozen municipal elected officials, leveraging the network he built over a long period as a Liberal activist before holding public offices. Despite having served in caucus the longest among the contestants, only one former MPP who served in caucus with Coteau endorsed him.

=== Kate Graham ===
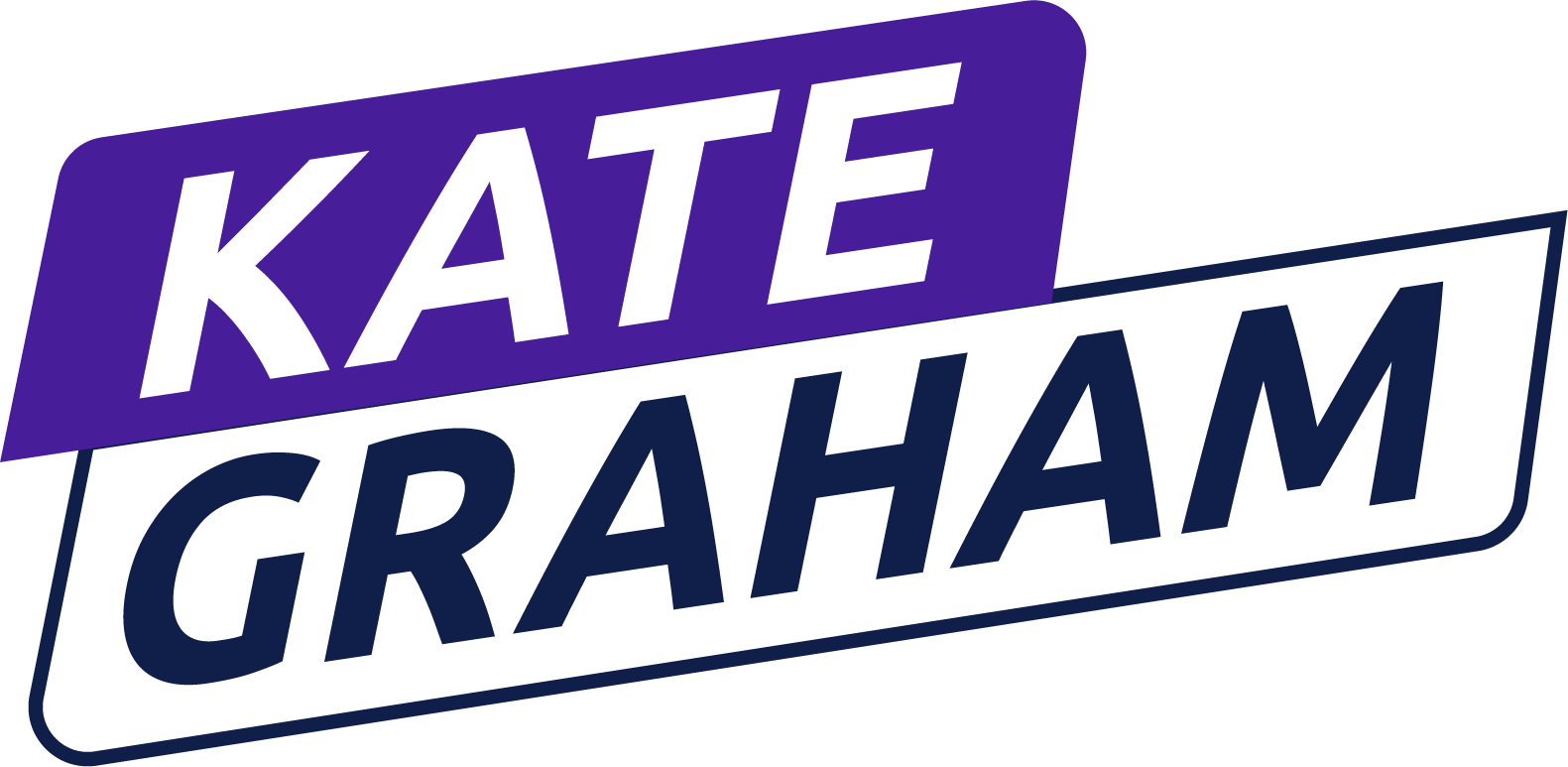
Kate Graham campaign logo

Kate Graham was the 2018 candidate in London North Centre, a former civil servant at City of London, and instructor at Western University.

Date announced: September 7, 2019
Date registered with Elections Ontario: August 23, 2019
Campaign website: kateforleader.ca
Members signed up: not disclosed
Contributions received: $217,057.33
Campaign expenditures: $246,836.85
Endorsements: Graham was backed by seven former MPPs, five of them former cabinet members. Her most prominent backers were her political mentor, former deputy premier Deb Matthews, and the former party leader Lyn MacLeod. She was also endorsed by Ted McMeekin, the leading left-winger in the McGuinty and Wynne ministries.

=== Brenda Hollingsworth ===
Brenda Hollingsworth is a Ottawa personal injury lawyer.

Date announced: November 25, 2019
Date registered with Elections Ontario:
Campaign website: brendahollingsworth.ca
Members signed up: 0
Contributions received: $15,355.00
Campaign expenditures: $36,061.10
Endorsements: Hollingsworth did not release any endorsements.

=== Mitzie Hunter ===
Mitzie Hunter campaign logo

Mitzie Hunter is the MPP for Scarborough—Guildwood (since 2013), former minister of Advanced Education and Skills Development (2018), minister of Education (2016–2018), and associate minister of Finance (2014–2016). If Hunter had been the victor she would have been the first black leader of a major political party in Canada both on a federal and provincial level.

Date announced: August 14, 2019
Date registered with Elections Ontario: August 20, 2019
Campaign website: www.mitziehunter.ca
Members signed up: 2,000
Contributions received: $306,907.00
Campaign expenditures: $355,507.00
Endorsements: Hunter was endorsed by John McKay, the MP who represented her constituency in Ottawa, two former MPPs, and a handful of municipal officials, including an eye-catching endorsement from then Timmins councillor and future mayor Michelle Boileau, who delivered eight delegates, the largest delegate haul for the Hunter campaign outside of her own Scarborough constituency.

=== Alvin Tedjo ===
Alvin Tedjo was the 2018 candidate in Oakville North—Burlington, former director of Government Relations for Sheridan College, and former political staff for multiple ministers of Training, Colleges and Universities.

Date announced: May 27, 2019
Date registered with Elections Ontario: August 23, 2019
Campaign website: www.alvintedjo.ca
Members signed up: 1,000
Contributions received: $115,878.00
Campaign expenditures: $169,309.00
Endorsements: Tedjo was endorsed by Walt Elliot, a Peterson era MPP who represented the constituency Tedjo contested in the 2018 election. He was also endorsed by Conservative senator Hugh Segal, who was not a member of the party and thus eligible to vote in the contest, but was highly regarded by many senior Liberals from his time as a senior aide to Progressive Conservative Premier Bill Davis.

== Declined ==
=== Declared intention to party officials, with representatives attended at least one campaign representatives meetings ===
- Kyle Peterson, former federal Liberal MP for Newmarket—Aurora (2015–2019)
- Arthur Potts, former MPP for Beaches—East York (2014–2018) and parliamentary assistant to the minister of Agriculture, Food and Rural Affairs.

=== Took exploratory steps ===
- Yvan Baker, current federal Liberal MP for Etobicoke Centre (2019-), former MPP for Etobicoke Centre (2014–2018), and former parliamentary assistant to the minister of Finance
- Bonnie Crombie, former federal MP for Mississauga—Streetsville (2008–2011), mayor of Mississauga (2014–2024)
- Nathalie Des Rosiers, former minister of Natural Resources and Forestry and MPP for Ottawa—Vanier 2016–2019, and previously general counsel for the Canadian Civil Liberties Association (2009–2013). Announced May 2019 that she was leaving politics to become principal of Massey College.
- Mark Holland, federal Liberal MP for Ajax since 2015, MP for Ajax—Pickering (2004–2011), parliamentary secretary to the minister of Public Safety and Emergency Preparedness
- Marie-France Lalonde, MPP for Orléans 2014–2019 and former minister of Community Safety and Correctional Services. Announced in May 2019 that she intended to run for the federal Liberal nomination in Orléans.
- Michael Lublin, entrepreneur, former Doug Ford supporter
- Yasir Naqvi, CEO of Institute for Canadian Citizenship and former attorney general of Ontario and MPP for Ottawa Centre (2007–2018)
- Adam Vaughan, federal Liberal MP for Spadina—Fort York since 2014, previously Toronto city councillor (2006–2014)

=== Speculated, but no reported exploratory effort ===
- Dwight Duncan, former minister of Finance and deputy premier under Dalton McGuinty, former MPP for successive Windsor, Ontario ridings (1995–2013), third place leadership candidate in 1996, currently senior strategic advisor at McMillan LLP
- Chris Hadfield, astronaut, musician and pilot in the Royal Canadian Air Force
- David Henderson, 2018 Liberal candidate in Leeds—Grenville—Thousand Islands and Rideau Lakes. After Wynne's admission that the Liberals would not win the provincial election, Henderson announced he would run for Liberal leader if he was elected. He was defeated on election day.
- Eric Hoskins, leadership candidate in 2013, former Ontario minister of Health and Long-Term Care and former MPP for St. Paul's (2009–2018)
- Jennifer Keesmaat, former chief city planner of Toronto and 2018 Toronto mayoral election candidate
- Jeff Lehman, mayor of Barrie, economist and development expert
- John Milloy, former minister of Government Services for Kathleen Wynne, former Government House leader, minister of Training, Colleges & Universities, minister of Community & Social Services, and minister of Research & Innovation for Dalton McGuinty, former MPP for Kitchener Centre (2003–2014), practitioner-in-residence at Wilfrid Laurier University
- Tim Murphy, former Liberal MPP (St. George—St. David, 1993–1995), former president of the Ontario Liberal Party, former Liberal provincial election campaign co-chair, former chief of staff to Prime Minister Paul Martin (2003–2006)
- Jane Philpott, former federal cabinet minister (2017–2019) and former MP for Markham—Stouffville (2015–2019). Resigned from federal Liberal cabinet to protest the SNC-Lavalin affair.
- Sandra Pupatello, leadership runner-up in 2013, former chair of Hydro One, former MPP for Windsor West (1995–2011) and former minister of Community and Social Services and Minister of Education under Dalton McGuinty. Announced that she will not be returning to provincial politics and will seek the federal Liberal nomination in Windsor West for the 2019 federal election.
- Charles Sousa, leadership candidate in 2013, former Ontario minister of Finance and former MPP for Mississauga South (2007–2018)
- Belinda Stronach, former federal MP for Newmarket—Aurora (2004–2008), former federal minister of Human Resources and Skills Development, president and chair of The Stronach Group
- John Tory, mayor of Toronto (2014–2023), leader of the Progressive Conservative Party of Ontario (2004–2009)
- John Wilkinson, minister of Research and Innovation, minister of Revenue, and minister of the Environment under Dalton McGuinty, former MPP for Perth—Middlesex (2003–2007) and Perth—Wellington (2007–2011)

== Endorsements ==
As typical in leadership contests of the two main political parties in Canada and other countries with government based on the Westminster model, the public support of incumbent caucus members were the endorsements most prized by the contestants and most often cited by journalists and pundits. The Ontario Liberal Party was decimated in the 2018 Ontario election, leaving only seven survivors in caucus. Among them, two were candidate themselves, two resigned by the fall of 2019 (their successors were not elected until a week prior to the convention), and both the outgoing leader Kathleen Wynne and interim leader John Fraser remained neutral throughout the contest. This left long time Thunder Bay MPP Michael Gravelle the only caucus endorsement up for grab in the traditional sense. The Del Duca campaign released Gravelle's endorsement a month prior to members voting.

The next most sought after groups were the former MPPs, especially those in office prior to the 2018 election, and the Liberals MPs representing Ontario electoral districts as they were the most likely figures to have on the ground political organization at their disposal. They also played an outsized role in the contest as party granted all former Ontario Liberal MPPs and all current Liberal MPs representing Ontario electoral districts status as voting delegate at the convention.

(Note: Endorsements from municipal elected officials and some other prominent individuals are listed below. They were not tallied as the diversity in types of offices and in sizes of electorate make a simple count of limited value.)	MPPs		MPs (Note: Former MPs unlike the other three categories were not automatic delegates, but as an easily distinguishable group was often cited by press.)	
(Note: Endorsements from municipal elected officials and some other prominent individuals are listed below. They were not tallied as the diversity in types of offices and in sizes of electorate make a simple count of limited value.)	Current	Former	Current	Former
Total available	7	~160	79	~270
Michael Coteau	1 (self)	9	5	5 (Note: Endorsement from an MP representing an electoral district in Quebec was not included in the tally.)
Steven Del Duca	1	34	22	11
Kate Graham		7	1	
Brenda Hollingsworth				
Mitzie Hunter	1 (self)	2	1	2
Alvin Tedjo		1		(Note: Endorsement from Conservative senator Hugh Segal was excluded.)

== Results ==
=== Summary of local voting results ===
	Voted Sat, Feb 8				Voted Sun, Feb 9				Mail	Delegates earned	
Candidate	North	SW	South Cen.	Cen. West	T.O.	Cen. North	Cen. East	East	North	Total	%
Coteau	18	20	33	22	130	50	29	66	2	370	17.75%
Del Duca	84	108	190	198	191	162	75	112	52	1,172	56.24%
Graham	8	84	43	14	43	25	24	30	2	273	13.10%
Hollingsworth	4	0	2	0	0	1	0	18	0	25	1.20%
Hunter	4	14	15	5	39	7	17	7	22	130	6.24%
Tedjo	2	5	15	7	16	4	13	8	2	72	3.45%
Independent	0	9	7	2	7	7	2	8	0	42	2.02%
Total	120	240	305	248	426	256	160	249	80	2084	100.00%

Ontario Liberal Party's organizational regions were as follows in 2020:

Voted on Saturday, February 8
- North (Nipissing and north of)
- Southwest
- South Central (Hamilton-Wentworth, Niagara, Waterloo-Wellington)
- Central West (Peel, Halton)
Voted on Sunday February 9
- Toronto (two organizational regions, both voted Feb 9)
- Central North (York, Simcoe, Parry Sound—Muskoka)
- Central East (Durham to Hastings)
- East (Frontenac and east of, inclusive of Renfrew)

Five constituency associations in the north with membership spread across large geographical areas voted by mail.

=== Result by electoral district/club ===
Tables show number of delegates won by the contestants.

Result by electoral districts/club

Toronto	Coteau	Del Duca	Graham	Hollingsworth	Hunter	Tedjo	Independent	Total
Total	127	172	40	0	38	16	7	400
Toronto & York
Beaches—East York	8	4	3	0	1	0	0	16
Davenport	4	5	5	0	1	1	0	16
Eglinton—Lawrence	3	5	4	0	2	1	1	16
Parkdale—High Park	5	4	4	0	2	1	0	16
Spadina—Fort York	4	6	2	0	1	2	1	16
Toronto Centre	7	5	3	0	1	0	0	16
Toronto—Danforth	6	7	2	0	0	1	0	16
Toronto—St. Paul's	7	4	2	0	2	1	0	16
University—Rosedale	6	4	3	0	1	1	1	16
North York
Don Valley East	11	4	1	0	0	0	0	16
Don Valley North	6	7	2	0	0	0	1	16
Don Valley West	5	8	2	0	0	1	0	16
Humber River—Black Creek	2	13	0	0	1	0	0	16
Willowdale	8	4	2	0	1	1	0	16
York Centre	2	11	1	0	1	1	0	16
York South—Weston	0	13	1	0	1	1	0	16
Scarborough
Scarborough—Agincourt	4	9	0	0	2	1	0	16
Scarborough Centre	9	7	0	0	0	0	0	16
Scarborough—Guildwood	3	1	0	0	12	0	0	16
Scarborough North	3	8	0	0	2	1	2	16
Scarborough—Rouge Park	8	5	1	0	2	0	0	16
Scarborough Southwest	8	7	0	0	1	0	0	16
Etobicoke
Etobicoke Centre	3	10	0	0	2	1	0	16
Etobicoke—Lakeshore	4	6	2	0	2	1	1	16
Etobicoke North	1	15	0	0	0	0	0	16

905	Coteau	Del Duca	Graham	Hollingsworth	Hunter	Tedjo	Independent	Total
Total	100	493	56	1	29	25	16	720
Peel
Brampton Centre	1	15	0	0	0	0	0	16
Brampton East	2	14	0	0	0	0	0	16
Brampton North	0	16	0	0	0	0	0	16
Brampton South	0	15	0	0	1	0	0	16
Brampton West	0	15	0	0	1	0	0	16
Mississauga Centre	1	15	0	0	0	0	0	16
Mississauga East—Cooksville	1	15	0	0	0	0	0	16
Mississauga—Erin Mills	1	14	1	0	0	0	0	16
Mississauga—Lakeshore	5	5	1	0	1	3	1	16
Mississauga—Malton	0	16	0	0	0	0	0	16
Mississauga—Streetsville	0	14	0	0	0	1	1	16
York
Aurora—Oak Ridges—Richmond Hill	2	11	2	0	1	0	0	16
King—Vaughan	1	15	0	0	0	0	0	16
Markham—Stouffville	2	12	1	0	1	0	0	16
Markham—Thornhill	1	14	0	0	1	0	0	16
Markham—Unionville	5	7	0	0	0	0	4	16
Newmarket—Aurora	2	12	1	0	1	0	0	16
Richmond Hill	5	11	0	0	0	0	0	16
Thornhill	4	9	0	0	2	1	0	16
Vaughan—Woodbridge	0	16	0	0	0	0	0	16
Durham
Ajax	4	10	0	0	2	0	0	16
Durham	0	11	1	0	3	1	0	16
Oshawa	3	5	5	0	0	3	0	16
Pickering—Uxbridge	3	11	1	0	1	0	0	16
Whitby	2	6	4	0	2	1	1	16
Halton
Burlington	1	5	9	0	0	1	0	16
Milton	1	14	0	0	1	0	0	16
Oakville	6	6	2	0	1	1	0	16
Oakville North—Burlington	3	11	1	0	0	1	0	16
Hamilton Niagara Brant
Brantford—Brant	1	13	1	0	0	0	1	16
Flamborough—Glanbrook	1	12	1	0	1	0	1	16
Haldimand—Norfolk	3	6	2	0	2	0	3	16
Hamilton Centre	1	10	4	0	0	1	0	16
Hamilton East—Stoney Creek	0	13	1	0	1	1	0	16
Hamilton Mountain	1	14	1	0	0	0	0	16
Hamilton West—Ancaster—Dundas	2	9	3	0	1	1	0	16
Niagara Centre	3	9	2	0	1	1	0	16
Niagara Falls	1	13	0	0	1	1	0	16
Niagara West	4	5	0	0	1	4	2	16
St. Catharines	3	10	1	0	1	1	0	16
Simcoe
Barrie—Innisfil	2	12	0	1	1	0	0	16
Barrie—Springwater—Oro-Medonte	3	11	1	0	0	1	0	16
Simcoe—Grey	4	6	3	0	0	1	2	16
Simcoe North	6	4	6	0	0	0	0	16
York—Simcoe	9	6	1	0	0	0	0	16

Southwestern Ontario	Coteau	Del Duca	Graham	Hollingsworth	Hunter	Tedjo	Independent	Total
Total	33	172	112	2	15	9	9	352
Kitchener-Waterloo
Cambridge	1	11	3	0	1	0	0	16
Guelph	1	12	3	0	0	0	0	16
Kitchener Centre	1	8	4	1	1	0	1	16
Kitchener—Conestoga	2	4	9	0	0	1	0	16
Kitchener South—Hespeler	4	9	2	0	0	1	0	16
Waterloo	1	7	6	0	0	1	1	16
Wellington—Halton Hills	5	6	2	1	1	0	1	16
London
Elgin—Middlesex—London	2	6	7	0	0	1	0	16
London—Fanshawe	0	6	9	0	1	0	0	16
London North Centre	1	2	13	0	0	0	0	16
London West	0	2	13	0	0	1	0	16
Windsor-Essex
Chatham-Kent—Leamington	1	6	8	0	0	0	1	16
Essex	0	14	1	0	0	1	0	16
Windsor—Tecumseh	1	14	1	0	0	0	0	16
Windsor West	1	13	2	0	0	0	0	16
Rural Southwest
Bruce—Grey—Owen Sound	3	7	4	0	1	1	0	16
Dufferin—Caledon	1	13	1	0	0	1	0	16
Huron—Bruce	3	6	7	0	0	0	0	16
Lambton—Kent—Middlesex	2	2	8	0	0	0	4	16
Oxford	1	7	4	0	3	1	0	16
Perth—Wellington	1	6	3	0	6	0	0	16
Sarnia—Lambton	1	11	2	0	1	0	1	16

Eastern Ontario	Coteau	Del Duca	Graham	Hollingsworth	Hunter	Tedjo	Independent	Total
Total	81	114	39	18	14	15	7	288
Ottawa
Carleton	8	4	1	1	0	2	0	16
Kanata—Carleton	4	11	0	1	0	0	0	16
Nepean	2	12	1	1	0	0	0	16
Orléans	2	11	1	1	1	0	0	16
Ottawa Centre	4	3	3	3	1	1	1	16
Ottawa South	2	9	3	1	0	0	1	16
Ottawa—Vanier	6	1	6	1	1	1	0	16
Ottawa West—Nepean	5	3	2	5	0	1	0	16
Eastern Ontario
Bay of Quinte	6	8	0	0	2	0	0	16
Glengarry—Prescott—Russell	2	11	1	1	0	1	0	16
Haliburton—Kawartha Lakes—Brock	4	0	5	0	3	4	0	16
Hastings—Lennox and Addington	3	9	1	0	2	1	0	16
Kingston and the Islands	12	4	0	0	0	0	0	16
Lanark—Frontenac—Kingston	8	0	2	3	1	1	1	16
Leeds—Grenville—Thousand Islands and Rideau Lakes	7	0	5	0	1	0	3	16
Northumberland—Peterborough South	3	10	1	0	1	1	0	16
Peterborough—Kawartha	1	5	6	0	1	2	1	16
Stormont—Dundas—South Glengarry	2	13	1	0	0	0	0	16

Northern Ontario	Coteau	Del Duca	Graham	Hollingsworth	Hunter	Tedjo	Independent	Total
Total	23	141	21	4	28	5	2	224
Northern Ontario
Algoma—Manitoulin	4	10	0	0	2	0	0	16
Kenora—Rainy River	0	6	2	0	6	2	0	16
Nickel Belt	4	12	0	0	0	0	0	16
Nipissing	2	12	0	2	0	0	0	16
Parry Sound—Muskoka	3	3	9	0	0	0	1	16
Renfrew—Nipissing—Pembroke	0	10	2	0	2	1	1	16
Sault Ste. Marie	1	12	1	0	2	0	0	16
Sudbury	1	11	2	1	0	1	0	16
Thunder Bay—Atikokan	5	7	4	0	0	0	0	16
Thunder Bay—Superior North	1	12	1	1	0	1	0	16
Timiskaming—Cochrane	2	14	0	0	0	0	0	16
Timmins	0	8	0	0	8	0	0	16
Kiiwetinoong	0	8	0	0	8	0	0	16
Mushkegowuk—James Bay	0	16	0	0	0	0	0	16

Student and Women Liberals	Coteau	Del Duca	Graham	Hollingsworth	Hunter	Tedjo	Independent	Total
Total	6	80	5	0	6	2	1	100
Young Liberal Clubs
Carleton University	1	6	1	0	0	0	0	8
Laurentian University	0	8	0	0	0	0	0	8
McMaster University	0	8	0	0	0	0	0	8
Queen's University	0	7	1	0	0	0	0	8
Ryerson University	2	6	0	0	0	0	0	8
University of Guelph	0	6	0	0	0	2	0	8
University of Ottawa	1	7	0	0	0	0	0	8
University of Toronto (St. George)	0	6	1	0	1	0	0	8
University of Toronto (Mississauga)	0	8	0	0	0	0	0	8
University of Toronto (Scarborough)	0	6	2	0	0	0	0	8
University of Waterloo	0	3	0	0	5	0	0	8
Wilfrid Laurier University	0	8	0	0	0	0	0	8
Women Liberal Clubs
Willowdale Women's Club	1	0	0	0	0	0	0	1
Kanata-Carleton Women's Club	0	0	0	0	0	0	1	1
Brantford-Brant Women's Club	1	0	0	0	0	0	0	1
Tuesday Luncheon Women's Club	0	1	0	0	0	0	0	1

=== Convention results ===
Candidate	Delegate Elected		First (final) ballot	
Steven Del Duca	1,172	56.2%	1,258	58.8%
Michael Coteau	370	17.8%	363	16.9%
Kate Graham	273	13.1%	299	13.9%
Mitzie Hunter	130	6.2%	122	5.7%
Alvin Tedjo	72	3.4%	74	3.5%
Brenda Hollingsworth	25	1.2%	24	1.1%
Independent	42	2.0%		
Total	2084		2140	

There was one spoiled ballot.
