= Arthur Potts (politician) =

Canadian politician

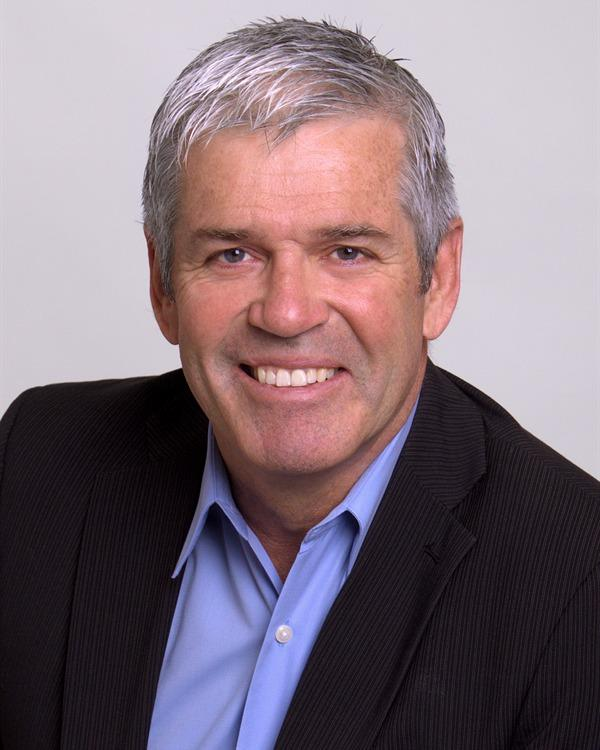

Ontario MPP
- In office 2014–2018
- Preceded by: Michael Prue
- Succeeded by: Rima Berns-McGown
- Constituency: Beaches—East York

Personal details
- Born: 1957 (age 68–69)
- Party: Liberal
- Spouse: Lisa Martin
- Children: 2
- Profession: Businessman

Arthur Howard Potts (born c. 1957) is a former politician in Ontario, Canada. He was a Liberal member of the Legislative Assembly of Ontario from 2014 to 2018 who represented the riding of Beaches—East York.

== Background ==
Potts attended the University of Toronto and graduated with a bachelor's degree in political philosophy. He then obtained a master's degree in industrial relations from Queen's University. He worked as a lobbyist in the city of Toronto and at the provincial level; and gained some notoriety by buying dinner with the mayor at an auction. Among his clients was the Open Shop Contractors Association of Ontario, an organization that sought to open up tendering to all qualified contractors, regardless of their union affiliation. Potts was a registered lobbyist for the Open Shop Contractors Association, following the merger of the Toronto Independent Contractors Association, which he founded, with OSCA. He also represented The Beer Store, assisting them in convincing the Ontario government to implement a deposit/return system on LCBO containers, as well as firms in the film, recycling and construction industries, During this time he also served as President of BioWaste Treatment Technologies, which owned the Ontario rights to an Israeli-based anaerobic digestion technology that can divert upwards of 75% of mixed municipal waste from landfill, while creating clean water, energy and compost. He also co-founded Woodwaste Solutions, a firm specializing in waste wood reuse and recycling. He lives in Toronto, Ontario with his partner Lisa Martin, who has three children, while he has two daughters of his own, Robin and Dara.

== Politics ==
In the 1994 municipal election he ran for councillor on Toronto City Council in Ward 8 (Riverdale) but lost to incumbent Peter Tabuns. In the 2014 Ontario election, he was elected in the riding of Beaches—East York in a tight race, beating incumbent New Democrat Michael Prue by 431 votes.

In July 2014, he was appointed as Parliamentary Assistant (PA) to the Minister of Agriculture, Food and Rural Affairs. Subsequently, he served as Parliamentary Assistant for the Minister of Environment and Climate Change.

In September 2016, Potts introduced a private member's bill called "Protecting Rewards Points Act" that would prevent loyalty points from expiring. Earlier in the year, Air Miles Canada announced that points collected but not used that were older than five years would expire. Potts introduced his bill to prevent this from happening. The bill was passed with unanimous approval in December 2016. Faced with the impending legislation, Air Miles announced that they would reverse their earlier decision. However the legislation still passed to prevent Air Miles and other loyalty point schemes from doing so in the future.

Potts was defeated in the 2018 Ontario general election. He later briefly ran in the 2020 Ontario Liberal Party leadership election.

Potts ran for the federal Liberal nomination for the 2026 Beaches—East York federal by-election, losing to Tanveer Shahnawaz in June.

== Election results ==
2018 Ontario general election
Party	Candidate	Votes	%	±%
New Democratic	Rima Berns-McGown	24,064	48.21	+9.24
Liberal	Arthur Potts	13,480	27.01	–13.08
Progressive Conservative	Sarah Mallo	9,202	18.44	+4.51
Green	Debra Scott	2,128	4.26	–1.16
Libertarian	Thomas Armstrong	458	0.92	–0.30
Independent	Andrew Balodis	161	0.32	
Special Needs	Regina Mundrugo	117	0.23	
None of the Above	Joe Ring	104	0.21	
Canadians' Choice	Bahman Yazdanfar	74	0.15	
Cultural Action	Eric Brazau	68	0.14	
The People	Tony Chipman	58	0.12	
Turnout		49,914	62.79	+6.69
Eligible voters		79,496		
New Democratic gain from Liberal		Swing		+11.16
Source: Elections Ontario

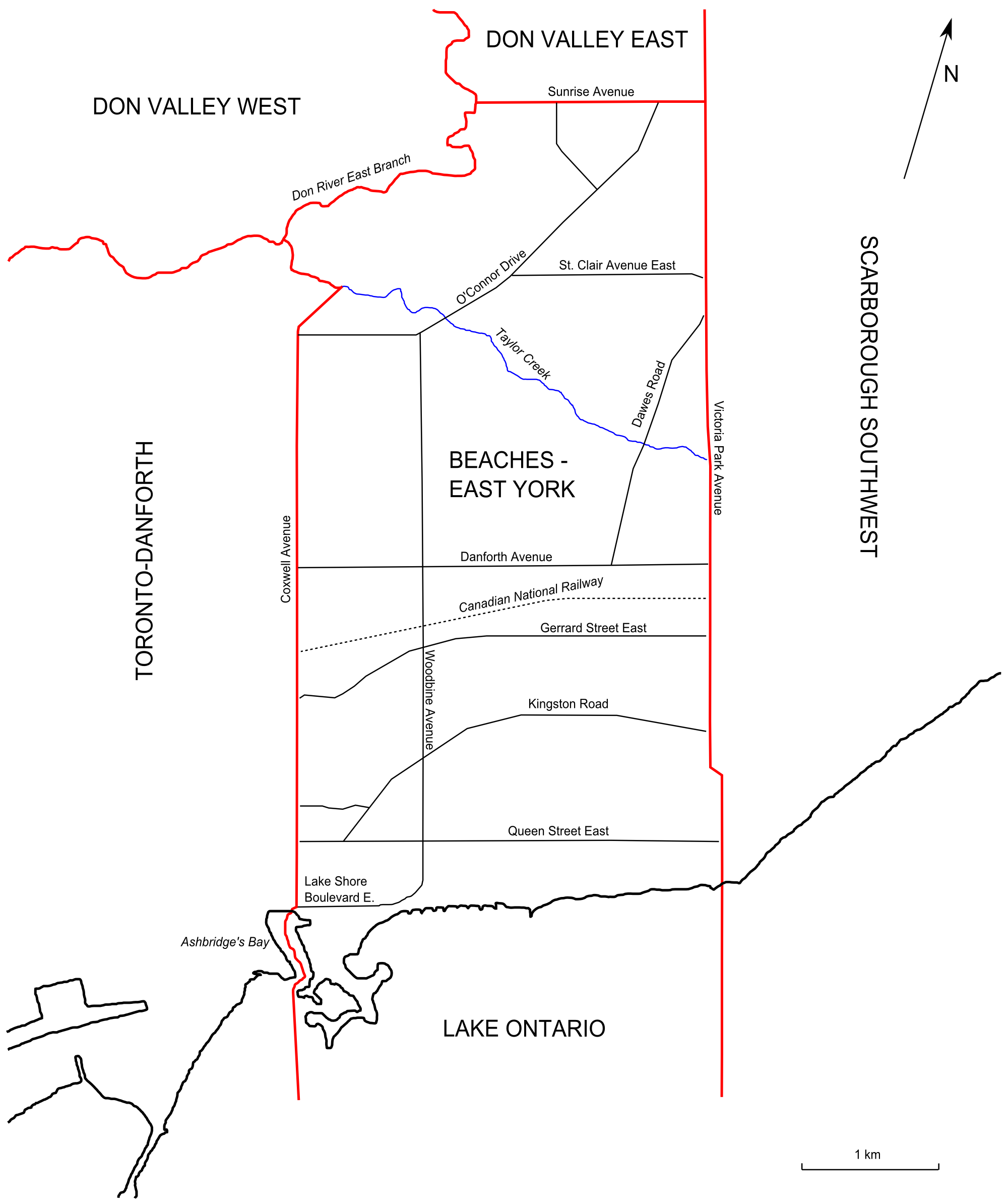
Map of Beaches-East York

2014 Ontario general election
Party	Candidate	Votes	%	±%
Liberal	Arthur Potts	17,218	40.09	+4.01
New Democratic	Michael Prue	16,737	38.97	-7.85
Progressive Conservative	Nicolas Johnson	5,982	13.93	±0
Green	Debra Scott	2,329	5.42	+2.74
Libertarian	Alex Lindsay	524	1.22	–
Freedom	Naomi Poley-Fisher	158	0.37	-0.01
Turnout		42,948	56.1	+4.46
Liberal gain from New Democratic		Swing		+5.93
Source: Elections Ontario

1994 Toronto election, Ward 8 (Riverdale)
Candidate	Votes	%
Peter Tabuns	6,134	46.61%
Arthur Potts	4,319	32.81%
Dan Salapoutis	1,991	15.12%
Michael Green	716	5.46%
Total	13,160	100%
