= Canadian House of Commons Standing Committee on Agriculture and Agri-Food =

Standing committee of the House of Commons of Canada

The House of Commons Standing Committee on Agriculture and Agri-Food (AGRI) is a standing committee of the House of Commons of Canada.

== Mandate ==
- Focus on bills, review of expenditures, policies, and programs of the Department of Agriculture and Agri-Food and its agencies:
  - The Canadian Food Inspection Agency
  - The Canadian Grain Commission
  - The Farm Products Council of Canada
  - The Canadian Dairy Commission
  - Farm Credit Canada
- Oversight of the Canadian Wheat Board and the Pest Management Regulatory Agency

== Membership ==
As of the 45th Canadian Parliament:

Party	Member	District
Liberal	Michael Coteau, chair	Scarborough—Woburn, ON
Conservative	John Barlow, vice chair	Foothills, AB
Bloc Québécois	Yves Perron, vice chair	Berthier—Maskinongé, QC
Conservative	Richard Bragdon	Tobique—Mactaquac, NB
Liberal	Sophie Chatel	Pontiac—Kitigan Zibi, QC
Liberal	Paul Connors	Avalon, NL
Liberal	Marianne Dandurand	Compton—Stanstead, QC
Conservative	Dave Epp	Chatham-Kent—Leamington, ON
Conservative	Jacques Gourde	Lévis—Lotbinière, QC
Liberal	Emma Harrison	Peterborough, ON

== Subcommittees ==
- Subcommittee on Agenda and Procedure (SAGR)
