= Rima Berns-McGown =

Canadian politician

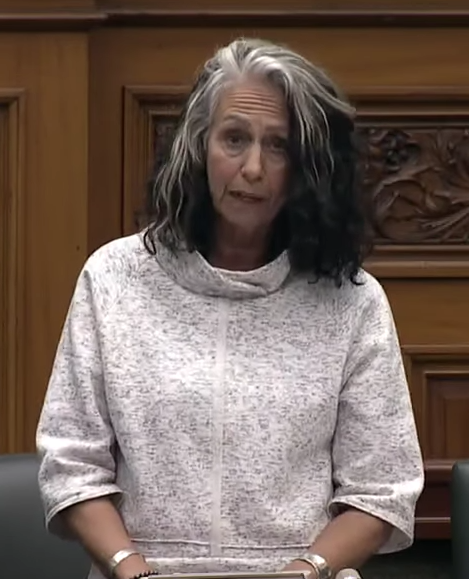

Critic, Poverty and Homelessness
- In office August 23, 2018 – May 3, 2022
- Leader: Andrea Horwath

Member of the Ontario Provincial Parliament for Beaches—East York
- In office June 7, 2018 – May 3, 2022
- Preceded by: Arthur Potts
- Succeeded by: Mary-Margaret McMahon

Personal details
- Born: South Africa
- Party: New Democratic
- Occupation: Author, researcher and professor

Rima Michelle Berns-McGown is a Canadian politician and author. A member of the Ontario New Democratic Party, Berns-McGown was elected to represent Beaches—East York in the Legislative Assembly of Ontario in the 2018 election. She declined to run for reelection in 2022, and was succeeded by Mary-Margaret McMahon of the Liberal Party.

== Early life and education ==
Berns-McGown was born in South Africa. Her paternal grandmother was of Cape Coloured and Afrikaner descent, while her other grandparents were Ashkenazi Jews. Her parents left South Africa in opposition to Apartheid. Berns-McGown moved to Canada when she was four years old and grew up in Montreal, Quebec.

== Political career ==
Berns-McGown was elected to the Ontario Provincial Parliament in the 2018 election, defeating Liberal incumbent Arthur Potts. Identifying as a person of mixed race ancestry in her piece Purity in Danger, Berns-McGown was part of Ontario's first ever Black Caucus, alongside NDP caucus colleagues Laura Mae Lindo, Faisal Hassan, Jill Andrew and Kevin Yarde.

She did not run for reelection in the 2022 provincial election, retiring after a single term in office. In a statement to the press, she noted: “Because I am a deeply introverted person, this job takes an enormous toll. For my well-being, I’ve decided not to run for re-election."

== Other activities ==
Prior to entering politics, Berns-McGown was an academic, teaching diaspora studies with the Centre for Diaspora and Transnational Studies at the University of Toronto, and was managing editor of International Journal, a Canadian academic quarterly on international politics.

She is the author of a book called Muslims in the Diaspora: The Somali Communities of London and Toronto (1999).

She now works as an "intuitive medium," assisting clients with connecting with their long-lost loved ones.

== Election results ==
2018 Ontario general election: Beaches—East York
Party	Candidate	Votes	%	±%
New Democratic	Rima Berns-McGown	24,064	48.21	+9.24
Liberal	Arthur Potts	13,480	27.01	–13.08
Progressive Conservative	Sarah Mallo	9,202	18.44	+4.51
Green	Debra Scott	2,128	4.26	–1.16
Libertarian	Thomas Armstrong	458	0.92	–0.30
Independent	Andrew Balodis	161	0.32	
Special Needs	Regina Mundrugo	117	0.23	
None of the Above	Joe Ring	104	0.21	
Canadians' Choice	Bahman Yazdanfar	74	0.15	
Cultural Action	Eric Brazau	68	0.14	
The People	Tony Chipman	58	0.12	
Turnout		49,914	62.79	+6.69
Eligible voters		79,496		
New Democratic gain from Liberal		Swing		+11.16
Source: Elections Ontario
