= Michael Prue =

Canadian politician

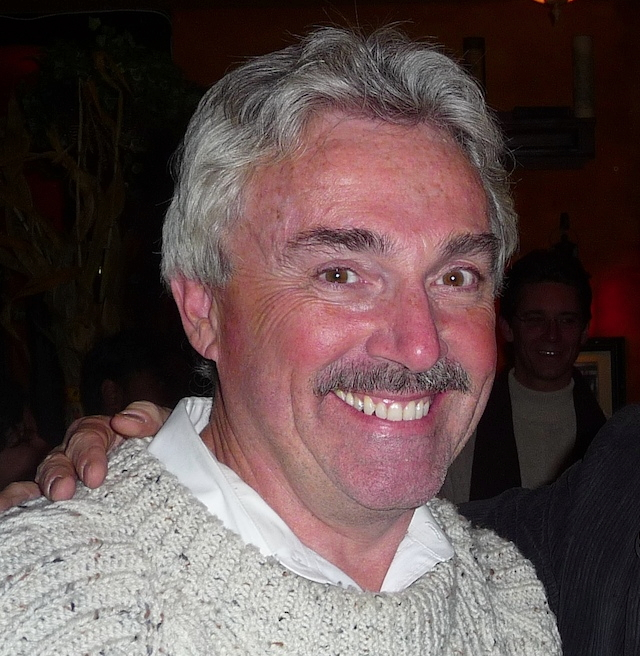
- Prue in October 2009

Mayor of Amherstburg
- In office 2022–2026
- Preceded by: Aldo DiCarlo
- Succeeded by: Chris Gibb (elect)

Ontario MPP
- In office 2001–2014
- Preceded by: Frances Lankin
- Succeeded by: Arthur Potts
- Constituency: Beaches—East York

Toronto City Councillor
- In office 1998–2001
- Preceded by: Ward created
- Succeeded by: Michael Tziretas
- Constituency: Ward 32, Beaches—East York

6th Mayor of East York
- In office 1993–1997
- Preceded by: David Johnson
- Succeeded by: Position abolished

Personal details
- Born: July 14, 1948 (age 78) Toronto, Ontario
- Party: New Democrat
- Spouse: Shirley Prue
- Occupation: Civil servant

Michael David Prue (born July 14, 1948) is a Canadian politician who was mayor of Amherstburg, Ontario from 2022 to 2026, mayor of East York, Ontario, from 1993 to 1997 and represented Beaches—East York in the Legislative Assembly of Ontario from 2001 to 2014 as a member of the Ontario New Democratic Party (NDP). He was a candidate in the 2009 Ontario New Democratic Party leadership election, finishing fourth. After moving to Amherstburg, he was elected to the town council in 2018, and became mayor in 2022. He was defeated in his bid for re-election in 2026 and subsequently announced his retirement from politics.

== Background ==
Prue grew up in Toronto's Regent Park neighbourhood. He has a Bachelor of Arts degree in political science and anthropology from the University of Toronto, and a Master of Arts degree in Canadian Studies from Carleton University. After graduation, he worked as counsel for the Minister of Employment and Immigration.

During his time as a federal government employee, Prue was an activist in the Canada Employment & Immigration Union, a component of the Public Service Alliance of Canada.

== Politics ==
=== Early political career ===
In the 1980 federal election, Prue ran as a federal NDP candidate in Scarborough Centre and received 9237 votes for a third-place finish. He ran in the same riding in the 1984 election, again placing third.

=== Municipal politics and mayoralty ===
Prue became a councillor in East York in 1988. In 1993 he was appointed mayor of the borough. The previous mayor David Johnson resigned when he won a provincial by-election. Rather than pay for the expense of a mayoral campaign, the East York council decided to choose a candidate from amongst themselves. Prue won the position after five ballots. (Note: Six of East York's nine councilors were nominated on the mayoral ballot: Prue, Case Ootes, George Vasilopoulos, Bob Dale, Lorna Krawchuk, and Jenner Jean Marie.) The next year, he was elected mayor in the 1994 municipal election and remained in the position until 1997, when East York and the other component municipalities of Metropolitan Toronto were merged into the single municipality of the city of Toronto. During his tenure as mayor, Prue brought in five consecutive budgets without a tax increase, while cutting East York's debt by $7.8 million. His mayoral tenure also saw the first major restructuring of East York's bureaucracy since 1959.

Before the 1998 municipal election, Prue successfully lobbied the provincial government to allot a third council seat for East York to improve its representation on Toronto City Council. Following amalgamation, Prue was elected to represent Ward 32 on Toronto City Council.

=== Provincial politics ===
On September 20, 2001, Prue won a by-election to replace retiring NDP MPP Frances Lankin in the Ontario legislature. There was some controversy during the by-election. Liberal candidate Bob Hunter accused the NDP of smearing his reputation. He accused Prue of calling him a pedophile based on a book he wrote in 1988. Pages of the book, which portrayed sexual encounters with young prostitutes, were faxed to journalists during the campaign. Hunter launched a libel lawsuit against Prue and NDP leader Howard Hampton but dropped the suit after the election. Prue won the by-election with 50% of the vote while Hunter received 36%.

He was re-elected in 2003, 2007, and 2011, with large pluralities.

In 2002 Prue undertook a week-long "welfare diet", trying to live on $12.05 for an entire week to draw attention to the condition of Ontario's poorest residents under the Mike Harris government. In 2004 during a debate over expenses charged by school trustees, Prue said that city councillors could do much of the work of trustees. He appeared to support combining the two roles. In 2007 he supported a push for more accountability for executive compensation packages. In May, 2007, he tabled a private member's bill called the Conrad Black Executive Compensation Abuse Act which sought to have pay packages put to binding shareholder votes.

He has also championed affordable housing in Toronto.

=== 2009 leadership convention ===
On July 18, 2008, Prue announced his intention to seek the leadership of the Ontario NDP at its 2009 leadership convention. At a press conference to announce his bid to replace Howard Hampton as leader of the Ontario NDP party, Prue made remarks on public funding for Catholic schools in Ontario. "The NDP policy is there, it says that we support the dual system," he said. "It is time though, I think, that we take a look at that, but we need to leave that to [the] convention. It cannot be my position or an individual's position... rather it must be a party position and we must have an open and frank debate to get to that point." He insisted he wasn't trying to reopen the debate about religion and schools.

Prue received 11.5% of the votes (weighted) on the first ballot, finishing in fourth place. According to the rules of the contest, as the last place finisher he was dropped off the next ballot. Prue gave his personal endorsement to Gilles Bisson who finished in third place on the first ballot with 23.7% of the weighted vote. After Bisson was eliminated on the next ballot, Prue endorsed Andrea Horwath, who won the leadership on the third ballot with 60.4% over rival Peter Tabuns.

Prue reported raising $79,411.74 for his leadership bid, the lowest of the four contestants. His expenses were the second highest at $222,320.94. His reported deficit was $142,909.20, the highest of the four contestants.

=== Subsequent career ===
Prue was narrowly defeated by Liberal candidate Arthur Potts in the 2014 provincial election. He lost by 431 votes.

== After Queen's Park ==
Following his defeat in 2014, Prue and his wife decided to sell their house in Toronto in order to fund their retirement in a smaller town, moving to Amherstburg, outside of Windsor, Ontario. After sitting on the town's committee of adjustment, Prue was elected to town council in 2018. He was elected as mayor of Amherstburg in the 2022 municipal election.

Prue sought a second term as mayor in the 2026 municipal election, held on October 26, 2026. He finished third with 1,704 votes, behind deputy mayor Chris Gibb, who won with 3,928 votes, and Bill Fryer, who received 3,284 votes.

Following his defeat, Prue said he was looking forward to retirement after 34 years in politics. He indicated that he had decided during the election campaign that it would be his last, citing the increasing physical demands of canvassing as he grew older. He also expressed his good wishes to the incoming council led by mayor-elect Chris Gibb.
