= Michael Coteau =

Canadian politician (born 1972)

The Honourable Michael Coteau ECO MP
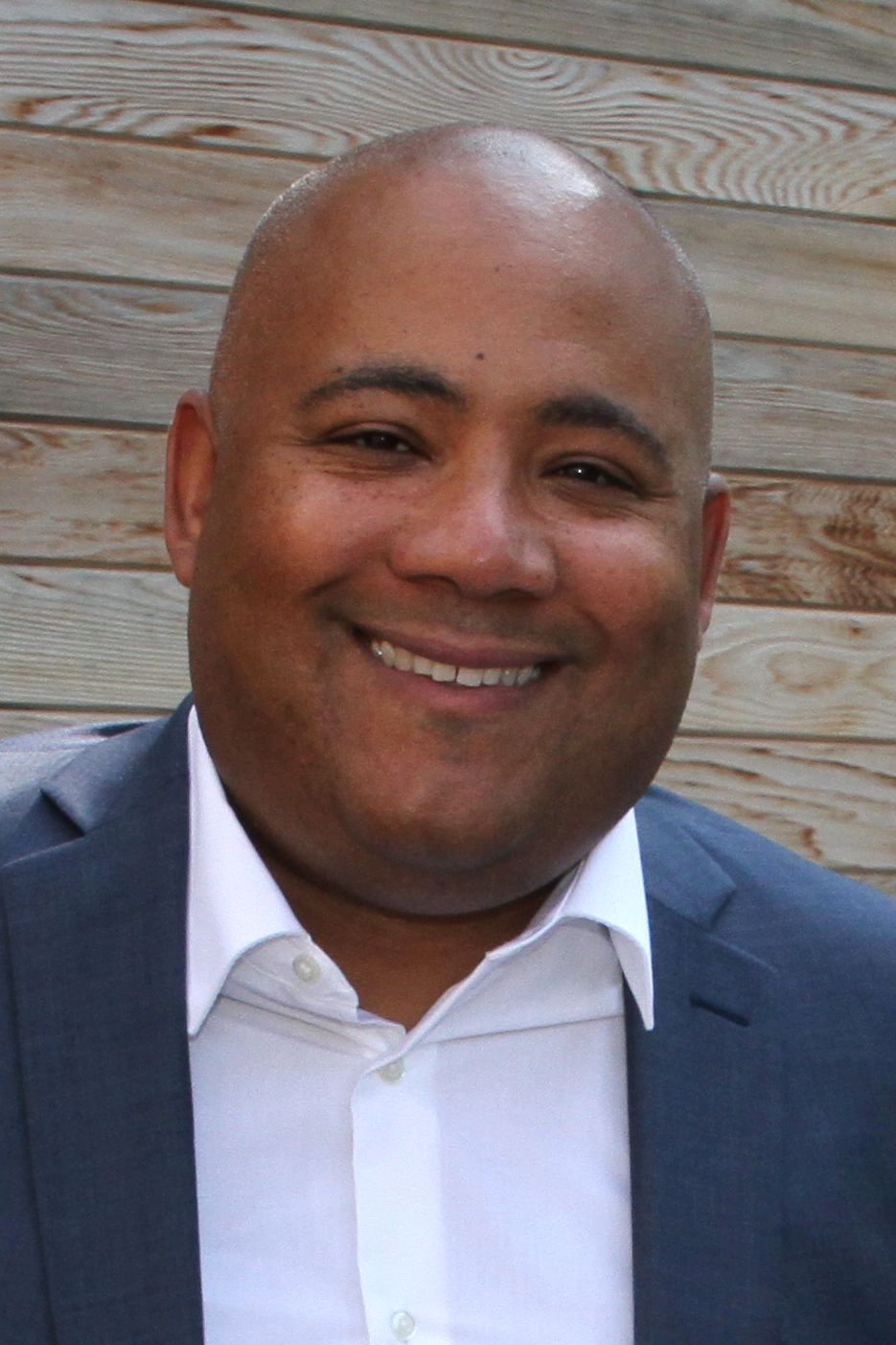
- Coteau in 2017

Member of Parliament for Scarborough—Woburn
- Incumbent
- Assumed office April 28, 2025
- Preceded by: Riding established

Member of Parliament for Don Valley East
- In office September 20, 2021 – April 28, 2025
- Preceded by: Yasmin Ratansi
- Succeeded by: Riding dissolved

Minister of Community and Social Services
- In office February 26, 2018 – June 29, 2018
- Premier: Kathleen Wynne
- Preceded by: Helena Jazeck
- Succeeded by: Lisa MacLeod

Minister of Children and Youth Services
- In office June 13, 2016 – June 29, 2018
- Premier: Kathleen Wynne
- Preceded by: Tracy MacCharles
- Succeeded by: Lisa MacLeod

Minister of Tourism, Culture and Sport
- In office June 24, 2014 – June 13, 2016
- Premier: Kathleen Wynne
- Preceded by: Michael Chan
- Succeeded by: Eleanor McMahon

Minister of Citizenship and Immigration
- In office February 11, 2013 – June 24, 2014
- Premier: Kathleen Wynne
- Preceded by: Michael Chan
- Succeeded by: Michael Chan

Member of the Ontario Provincial Parliament for Don Valley East
- In office October 6, 2011 – August 17, 2021
- Preceded by: David Caplan
- Succeeded by: Adil Shamji

Personal details
- Born: Michael Joseph Coteau; 1972 (age 53–54) Huddersfield, England
- Party: Liberal
- Spouse: Lori Coteau
- Children: 2
- Education: Carleton University (BA)
- Occupation: Educator, businessman

Michael Joseph Coteau is a Canadian politician who has served as the member of Parliament (MP) for Scarborough—Woburn in the House of Commons of Canada since 2025, having previously represented Don Valley East from 2021 to 2025.

From 2011 to 2021, Coteau represented Don Valley East in the Legislative Assembly of Ontario as a member of the Ontario Liberal Party. He held several cabinet positions under Premier Kathleen Wynne from 2013 to 2018, including Citizenship and Immigration, Tourism, Culture and Sport and Community and Social Services. Coteau was one of seven Liberals elected in the 2018 Ontario election and later ran in the 2020 Ontario Liberal Party leadership election, finishing second. He resigned his provincial seat in 2021 to enter federal politics.

== Background ==
Coteau was born in Huddersfield, England. His father is from Carriacou, Grenada and his mother, Sandra, was from Yorkshire, England. He moved to Canada with his parents in 1976 and grew up in social housing in Flemingdon Park in North York. Coteau's family was low-income and he had to borrow the money needed to cover his university application fee from a friend's father. After graduating from Leaside High School, he attended Carleton University and received a degree in history and political science.

After graduation, he taught English in South Korea.

At the time of the 2025 Canadian federal election, he lived in Scarborough, Ontario.

== Career ==
Coteau was a Toronto District School Board Trustee for Ward 17, winning elections in 2003, 2006, and 2010. As a trustee, he advocated for student nutrition, community use of space, and the use of educational technology. He initiated the 'Community Use of Schools' motion that cut user fees and made schools more accessible to groups that offer programs for children. He helped introduce nutritional changes in schools that supported healthy food programs and increased awareness of student hunger.

In addition to his work as a trustee, Coteau served as the executive director and chief executive officer of a national adult literacy firm, and worked as a community organizer in the Malvern area of Scarborough, Ontario with the United Way. He also owned and operated his own small business.

=== Provincial politics ===
In 2011, he ran provincial election in the riding of Don Valley East. He won the election, beating Progressive Conservative candidate Michael Lende by 7,645 votes. He was re-elected in 2014.

The Liberals won a minority government and Coteau was appointed as parliamentary assistant to the minister of tourism and culture. In 2013, after Kathleen Wynne replaced Dalton McGuinty as premier, Coteau was named Minister of Citizenship and Immigration. He was one of ten members of the Wynne's cabinet with no prior cabinet experience. In June 2014, Coteau was made Minister of Tourism, Culture and Sport by Premier Kathleen Wynne, as well as Minister Responsible for the 2015 Pan and Parapan American Games. He made headlines advocating for children to be able to play street hockey. On February 16, 2016, it was announced that Coteau would add responsibility for anti-racism, responsible for establishing various anti-racism programs. On June 13, 2016, he was appointed Minister of Children and Youth Services, and in particular worked collaboratively with parents to deliver a reformed Ontario Autism Program. He also was subsequently appointed Minister of Community and Social Services, holding down three separate portfolios for the government.

In 2018, Coteau defeated Progressive Conservative candidate Denzil Minnan Wong, Toronto's deputy mayor, to win his third election in the North Toronto constituency. He was one of just seven Liberals elected.

In June 2019, Coteau entered the race for leadership of the Ontario Liberal Party. Coteau said he had "a different vision" and would "restore decency to our politics". At the leadership convention on March 7, 2020, he received 16.9% of the vote, finishing second behind the winner, Steven Del Duca.

Coteau resigned from the Legislative Assembly of Ontario on August 17, 2021, to run for his constituency's federal seat, vacated by Yasmin Ratansi, in the 2021 federal election.

=== Federal politics ===
In August 2021, Coteau was nominated as the federal Liberal candidate in Don Valley East, ahead of the 2021 election. He was elected on September 20, 2021.

During the 2022 Canadian federal electoral redistribution, Don Valley East was merged with Scarborough Centre to create the new riding of Scarborough Centre—Don Valley East, setting up a potential face-off with fellow Liberal MP Salma Zahid for the party's nomination. After previously considering running in Toronto—St. Paul's in the 2024 by-election to replace Carolyn Bennett, Coteau ultimately won the Liberal nomination in Scarborough—Woburn following the retirement of John McKay. He was re-elected in the 2025 election. He was elected as the chair of the Canadian House of Commons Standing Committee on Agriculture and Agri-Food in the 45th Canadian Parliament.

=== Cabinet positions ===
Wynne ministry, Province of Ontario (2013–2018)
Cabinet posts (4)
Predecessor	Office	Successor
Helena Jaczek	Minister of Community and Social Services; February 26, 2018 — July 29, 2018	Lisa MacLeod (as Minister of Children, Community and Social Services)
Tracy MacCharles	Minister of Children and Youth Services; June 13, 2016 – June 29, 2018; Also responsible for Anti-Racism issues	Lisa MacLeod (as Minister of Children, Community and Social Services)
Michael Chan	Ministry of Tourism, Culture and Sport; June 24, 2014 – June 13, 2016; Also responsible for the 2015 Pan and Parapan American Games	Eleanor McMahon
Michael Chan	Minister of Citizenship and Immigration; February 11, 2013 – June 24, 2014	Michael Chan

=== Electoral record ===
2025 Canadian federal election: Scarborough—Woburn
Party	Candidate	Votes	%	±%	Expenditures
Liberal	Michael Coteau	25,281	60.38	–0.03	
Conservative	Reddy Muttukuru	14,291	34.13	+11.58	
New Democratic	George Wedge	1,466	3.50	–9.66	
Green	Gianne Broughton	499	1.19	N/A	
Independent	Amina Bhaiyat	181	0.43	N/A	
Centrist	Ayub Sipra	150	0.36	N/A	
Total valid votes/expense limit		41,868			
Total rejected ballots		386			
Turnout		42,254	59.37		
Eligible voters		71,167			
Liberal notional hold		Swing		–5.81	
Source: Elections Canada

2021 Canadian federal election: Don Valley East
Party	Candidate	Votes	%	±%	Expenditures
Liberal	Michael Coteau	22,356	59.90	+0.09	$90,078.21
Conservative	Penelope Williams	8,766	23.49	–0.43	$39,800.25
New Democratic	Simon Topp	4,618	12.37	+1.38	$10,191.25
People's	Peter De Marco	1,585	4.25	+2.92	none listed
Total valid votes/expense limit		37,325	100.00	–	$104,140.64
Total rejected ballots		470	1.24	+0.22	
Turnout		37,795	59.12	–5.11	
Eligible voters		63,934			
Liberal hold		Swing		+0.26	
Source: Elections Canada

2018 Ontario general election: Don Valley East
Party	Candidate	Votes	%	±%
Liberal	Michael Coteau	13,012	35.93	–22.80
Progressive Conservative	Denzil Minnan-Wong	11,984	33.09	+8.75
New Democratic	Khalid Ahmed	9,937	27.44	+15.48
Green	Mark Wong	917	2.53	–0.83
Libertarian	Justin Robinson	236	0.65	–
Freedom	Wayne Simmons	131	0.36	–0.47
Total valid votes		36,217	99.08	
Total rejected, unmarked and declined ballots		337	0.92	–0.27
Turnout		36,554	55.22	+7.38
Eligible voters		66,192		
Liberal hold		Swing		–15.78
Source: Elections Ontario

2014 Ontario general election
Party	Candidate	Votes	%	±%
Liberal	Michael Coteau	19,253	55.77	+4.69
Progressive Conservative	Angela Kennedy	9,227	26.73	-0.46
New Democratic	Akil Sadikali	4,492	13.01	-5.59
Green	Christopher McLeod	1,264	3.66	+1.47
Freedom	Wayne Simmons	287	0.83	+0.48
Total valid votes		34,523	100.0	
Liberal hold		Swing		+2.58
Source: Elections Ontario

2011 Ontario general election
Party	Candidate	Votes	%	±%
Liberal	Michael Coteau	16,342	51.08	-4.54
Progressive Conservative	Michael Lende	8,604	26.89	+1.86
New Democratic	Bob Hilliard	5,953	18.61	+7.95
Green	Aren Bedrosyan	742	2.32	-2.72
Family Coalition	Ryan Kidd	188	0.59	+0.03
Freedom	Wayne Simmons	164	0.51	+0.23
Total valid votes		31,993	100.00	
