= Stephanie Smyth =

Canadian politician (born 1964)

Stephanie Smyth MPP
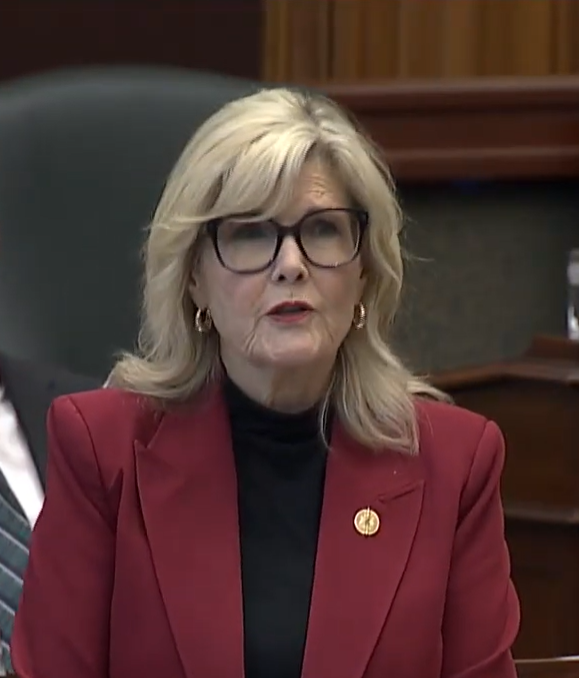
- Smyth in 2025

Member of the Ontario Provincial Parliament for Toronto—St. Paul's
- Incumbent
- Assumed office February 27, 2025
- Preceded by: Jill Andrew

Personal details
- Born: October 20, 1964 (age 61)
- Party: Ontario Liberal
- Spouse: Paul Cook (m. 2007)
- Occupation: Broadcast journalist; communications consultant

Stephanie Smyth MPP (born October 20, 1964) is a Canadian politician and retired broadcaster who has served as a Member of Provincial Parliament (MPP) for Toronto—St. Paul's since 2025. A member of the Ontario Liberal Party, she unseated two-term incumbent NDP member Jill Andrew.

== Broadcasting career ==
She was the news director and an on-air anchor at 680 News from 1993 to 2005, when she moved to Global Television Network as news director and then to 640 Toronto.

Subsequently, she was an anchor and managing editor at CP24 for nearly 15 years, from 2008 to 2022.

== Political career ==
After leaving CP24 in 2022, she volunteered on Brad Bradford's mayoral campaign in the 2023 Toronto mayoral by-election and then on Bonnie Crombie's successful 2023 Ontario Liberal Party leadership election campaign.

In the 2025 Ontario general election, she was elected to the Legislative Assembly of Ontario in Toronto—St. Paul's, defeating incumbent MPP Jill Andrew of the NDP in the process.

== Personal life ==
She has been married to Paul Cook, managing editor and morning anchor at 680 News, since 2007; each have two children from previous marriages.

== Electoral record ==
=== 2025 election ===
2025 Ontario general election
** Preliminary results — Not yet official **
Party	Candidate	Votes	%	±%
Liberal	Stephanie Smyth	17,421	40.88	+7.21
New Democratic	Jill Andrew	13,524	31.74	–4.52
Progressive Conservative	Riley Braunstein	10,799	25.34	+2.95
Green	Chloe Tangpongprush	871	2.04	–3.41
Total valid votes/expense limit		42,615		
Total rejected, unmarked, and declined ballots				
Turnout			46.98	–1.09
Eligible voters		90,708		
Liberal gain from New Democratic		Swing		+5.87
Source: Elections Ontario

== See also ==
- 44th Parliament of Ontario
