= Jill Andrew =

Canadian politician

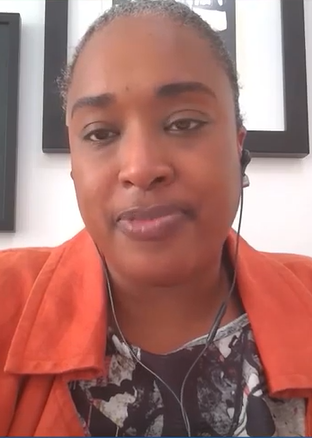

Member of the Ontario Provincial Parliament for Toronto—St. Paul's
- In office June 7, 2018 – January 28, 2025
- Preceded by: Eric Hoskins
- Succeeded by: Stephanie Smyth

Personal details
- Party: Ontario New Democratic
- Domestic partner: Aisha Fairclough
- Education: Humber College; York University; University of Toronto
- Occupation: Educator

Jill Andrew is a Canadian politician who served as the member of Provincial Parliament (MPP) for Toronto—St. Paul's from 2018 to 2025. A member of the Ontario New Democratic Party (NDP), Andrew was elected to the Legislative Assembly of Ontario in the 2018 provincial election. She was re-elected in 2022, but lost her seat in 2025.

== Education ==
Andrew attended Humber College, where she earned a child and youth worker diploma. She also holds a Bachelor of Education (BEd) from York University amongst her other undergraduate degrees, a master’s degree from the University of Toronto in women and gender studies, a PhD from the York University Faculty of Education.

== Political career ==
Andrew ran as the NDP candidate in Toronto—St. Paul's in the 2018 provincial election and was elected as a member of Provincial Parliament (MPP). She was the critic for culture and women's issues and was part of the Ontario NDP Black caucus, along with fellow MPPs Laura Mae Lindo, Faisal Hassan, Rima Berns-McGown and Kevin Yarde. She is the first Black and Queer person to be elected to the Ontario Legislature.

Andrew served as official opposition critic on a number of portfolios, including women's issues, culture and heritage. Andrew has passed several pieces of legislation, including Bill 61 which proclaims the week beginning February 1 in each year as Eating Disorders Awareness Week. Bill 61 received Royal Assent in December 2020.

As of August 11, 2024, Andrew served as the Official Opposition critic for Women's Social and Economic Opportunity as well as for Culture and Heritage. She was defeated in the 2025 Ontario general election by Liberal candidate Stephanie Smyth.

In 2026, Andrew endorsed Avi Lewis in that year's federal NDP leadership race.

== Personal life ==
Andrew identifies as queer. Andrew and her partner Aisha Fairclough, a television producer and diversity consultant, are members of the community consortium that own Glad Day Bookshop, an LGBT bookstore in Toronto's Church and Wellesley gay village. Andrew cofounded the group Body Confidence Canada.

== Electoral record ==
2025 Ontario general election: Toronto—St. Paul's
Party	Candidate	Votes	%	±%	Expenditures
Liberal	Stephanie Smyth	17,451	40.87	+7.20	$77,108
New Democratic	Jill Andrew	13,553	31.74	–4.52	$98,720
Progressive Conservative	Riley Braunstein	10,822	25.34	+2.95	$57,193
Green	Chloe Tangpongprush	873	2.04	–3.42	$11,655
Total valid votes/expense limit		42,699	99.34	+0.11	$147,539
Total rejected, unmarked, and declined ballots		284	0.66	–0.11	
Turnout		42,983	47.39	–0.68	
Eligible voters		90,708			
Liberal gain from New Democratic		Swing		+5.86	
Source: Elections Ontario

2022 Ontario general election: Toronto—St. Paul's
Party	Candidate	Votes	%	±%	Expenditures
New Democratic	Jill Andrew	15,292	36.26	+0.30	$121,230
Liberal	Nathan Stall	14,200	33.67	+0.27	$89,943
Progressive Conservative	Blake Libfeld	9,445	22.39	−3.90	$89,223
Green	Ian Lipton	2,302	5.46	+2.23	$11,507
New Blue	Yehuda Goldberg	473	1.12		$503
Ontario Party	Christian Ivanov Mihaylov	242	0.57		$0
Populist	Zoë Alexandra	138	0.33		$0
Moderate	Margarita Sharapova	87	0.21	−0.07	$1,543
Total valid votes/expense limit		42,179	100.0		$123,794
Total rejected, unmarked, and declined ballots		328			
Turnout		42,507	48.07		
Eligible voters		88,350			
New Democratic hold		Swing		+0.01	
Source(s): "Summary of Valid Votes Cast for Each Candidate" (PDF). Elections Ontario. 2022. Archived from the original on 2023-05-18.; "Statistical Summary by Electoral District" (PDF). Elections Ontario. 2022. Archived from the original on 2023-05-21.

2018 Ontario general election: Toronto—St. Paul's
Party	Candidate	Votes	%	±%
New Democratic	Jill Andrew	18,843	35.96	+25.75
Liberal	Jess Spindler	17,498	33.39	-26.26
Progressive Conservative	Andrew Kirsch	13,780	26.30	+2.41
Green	Teresa Pun	1,690	3.23	-1.85
Libertarian	Jekiah U. Dunavant	448	0.85	-0.03
Moderate	Marina Doshchitsina	143	0.27	+0.27
Total valid votes		52,402	98.97	
Total rejected, unmarked and declined ballots		547	1.03	
Turnout		52,949	63.63	
Eligible voters		83,206		
New Democratic gain from Liberal		Swing		+26.00
Source: Elections Ontario
