= Scarborough—Woburn =

Federal electoral district in Ontario, Canada

Ontario electoral district
- Interactive map of riding boundaries from the 2025 federal election

Federal electoral district
- Legislature: House of Commons
- District created: 2023
- First contested: 2025

Demographics
- Population (2021): 110,589
- Census division: Toronto
- Census subdivision: Toronto (part)

Scarborough—Woburn is a federal electoral district in Ontario, Canada. It came into effect upon the call of the 2025 Canadian federal election.

== Geography ==
Under the 2022 Canadian federal electoral redistribution the riding largely replaces Scarborough—Guildwood. The riding name refers to the neighbourhood of Woburn, Toronto.

- Gains the Eglinton East, Bendale South and Bendale-Glen Andrew neighbourhoods from Scarborough Centre
- Loses the neighbourhoods of Morningside, Guildwood and the remainder of West Hill to Scarborough—Guildwood—Rouge Park

== Demographics ==
According to the 2021 Canadian census

Languages: 50.6% English, 7.9% Tamil, 5.6% Gujarati, 5.1% Tagalog, 2.8% Bengali, 2.7% Urdu, 2.7% Cantonese, 2.5% Mandarin, 1.6% Hindi, 1.5% Farsi, 1.3% French, 1.2% Arabic, 1.1% Spanish, 1.0% Greek

Religions: 42.5% Christian (20.6% Catholic, 3.5% Christian Orthodox, 1.9% Anglican, 1.7% Pentecostal, 1.1% United Church, 13.7% Other), 19.5% Muslim, 19.4% Hindu, 15.8% No religion, 1.2% Buddhist

Median income: $32,800 (2020)

Average income: $40,240 (2020)

Panethnic groups in Scarborough—Woburn (2021)
Panethnic group	2021	
Panethnic group	Pop.	%
South Asian	42,610	37.96%
European (Note: Statistic includes all persons that did not make up part of a visible minority or an indigenous identity.)	21,410	19.53%
African	13,150	12%
Southeast Asian (Note: Statistic includes total responses of "Filipino" and "Southeast Asian" under visible minority section on census.)	12,290	11.21%
East Asian (Note: Statistic includes total responses of "Chinese", "Korean", and "Japanese" under visible minority section on census.)	8,205	7.49%
Middle Eastern (Note: Statistic includes total responses of "West Asian" and "Arab" under visible minority section on census.)	4,270	3.9%
Latin American	1,750	1.6%
Indigenous	720	0.66%
Other/multiracial (Note: Statistic includes total responses of "Visible minority, n.i.e." and "Multiple visible minorities" under visible minority section on census.)	5,250	4.79%
Total responses	109,615	98.93%
Total population	110,800	100%
Notes: Totals greater than 100% due to multiple origin responses. Demographics based on 2022 Canadian federal electoral redistribution riding boundaries.

== History ==
Parliament	Years	Member	Party
Scarborough—Woburn; Riding created from Scarborough Centre and Scarborough—Guildwood
45th	2025–present	Michael Coteau	Liberal

== Election results ==
2025 Canadian federal election
Party	Candidate	Votes	%	±%	Expenditures
Liberal	Michael Coteau	25,281	60.38	–0.03	
Conservative	Reddy Muttukuru	14,291	34.13	+11.58	
New Democratic	George Wedge	1,466	3.50	–9.66	
Green	Gianne Broughton	499	1.19	N/A	
Independent	Amina Bhaiyat	181	0.43	N/A	
Centrist	Ayub Sipra	150	0.36	N/A	
Total valid votes/expense limit		41,868			
Total rejected ballots		386			
Turnout		42,254	59.37		
Eligible voters		71,167			
Liberal notional hold		Swing		–5.81	
Source: Elections Canada

2021 federal election redistributed results
Party	Vote	%
Liberal	23,442	60.41
Conservative	8,750	22.55
New Democratic	5,106	13.16
People's	1,194	3.08
Others	314	0.81

== See also ==
- List of Canadian electoral districts
