= Beaches—East York (provincial electoral district) =

Provincial electoral district in Ontario, Canada

Coordinates: 43°41′04″N 79°19′06″W

Ontario electoral district
- Location in Toronto

Provincial electoral district
- Legislature: Legislative Assembly of Ontario
MPP
Mary-Margaret McMahon
Liberal
- District created: 1996
- First contested: 1999
- Last contested: 2025

Demographics
- Population (2016): 109,465
- Electors (2018): 82,386
- Area (km²): 19
- Pop. density (per km²): 5,761.3
- Census division: Toronto
- Census subdivision: Toronto

Beaches—East York is a provincial electoral district in Toronto, Ontario, Canada. It elects one member to the Legislative Assembly of Ontario. It was created in 1996 from parts of Beaches—Woodbine (95%), Don Mills (40%), and York East (20%).

When the riding was created, it included the former borough of East York east of Coxwell Avenue and that part of Old Toronto east of a line following Coxwell to Gerrard Street to Greenwood Avenue to Queen Street to Leslie Street. In 2007, the boundaries were altered so that everything west of Coxwell Avenue was transferred to Toronto—Danforth.

== Boundaries ==
In 1996, much of the province's old boundaries were redrawn due to the Fewer Politicians Act which reduced the number of seats in the legislature from 130 to 103 to match the number of federal seats.

The boundaries for the 1996 Beaches—East York electoral district began at the southwest corner and started where the southern extension of Leslie Street intersected with Lake Ontario, proceeded north along Leslie Street, then east along Queen Street East, north along Greenwood Avenue, east along Gerrard Street East, and north along Coxwell Avenue until it turned into Coxwell Boulevard at O'Connor Drive. It continued a short distance along this street where the boundary extended until it met Taylor-Massey Creek. It followed the creek west (downstream) until it met the Don River East Branch. The boundary followed the river northeast (upstream) until it met the point where a westerly extension of Sunrise Avenue intersects with the river course. The boundary continues east along Sunrise Avenue until it meets Victoria Park Avenue. The boundary turned south and followed the street south until it ended at Lake Ontario. The boundary followed the lake coast back west until it met the beginning point.

In 2003, the western boundary was altered so that the portion west of Coxwell Avenue was transferred to the neighbouring Toronto—Danforth electoral district.

== Members of Provincial Parliament ==
Beaches—East York
Assembly	Years	Member	Party
Riding created from Beaches—Woodbine, Don Mills and York East
37th	1999–2001	Frances Lankin	New Democratic
37th	2001–2003	Michael Prue	New Democratic
38th	2003–2007	Michael Prue	New Democratic
39th	2007–2011	Michael Prue	New Democratic
40th	2011–2014	Michael Prue	New Democratic
41st	2014–2018	Arthur Potts	Liberal
42nd	2018–2022	Rima Berns-McGown	New Democratic
43rd	2022–2025	Mary-Margaret McMahon	Liberal
44th	2025–present	Mary-Margaret McMahon	Liberal
Sourced from the Ontario Legislative Assembly

== Election results ==
Winning party in each polling division of Beaches—East York at the 2025 Ontario general election

2025 Ontario general election
Party	Candidate	Votes	%	±%	Expenditures
Liberal	Mary-Margaret McMahon	21,545	51.17	+15.75	$63,307
New Democratic	Kate Dupuis	9,660	22.94	–10.27	$115,614
Progressive Conservative	Anna Michaelidis	9,001	21.38	+2.84	$70,556
Green	Jack Pennings	1,298	3.08	–7.14	$4,350
New Blue	Thomas Gregory	246	0.58	–0.50	$0
Ontario Party	Paul Stark	125	0.30	–0.47	$0
Independent	Dragan Cimesa	122	0.29	–	$0
Canadians' Choice	Bahman Yazdanfar	107	0.25	+0.06	$0
Total valid votes/expense limit		42,104	99.58	–	$136,230
Total rejected, unmarked and declined ballots		178	0.42	+0.07	
Turnout		42,282	49.97	+0.39	
Eligible voters		84,615			
Liberal hold		Swing		+13.01	
Source: Elections Ontario

Winning party in each polling division of Beaches—East York at the 2022 Ontario general election

2022 Ontario general election
Party	Candidate	Votes	%	±%	Expenditures
Liberal	Mary-Margaret McMahon	14,398	35.42	+8.41	$91,050
New Democratic	Kate Dupuis	13,500	33.21	–15.00	$90,885
Progressive Conservative	Angela Kennedy	7,536	18.54	+0.10	$21,977
Green	Abhijeet Manay	4,154	10.22	+5.96	$43,979
New Blue	Stephen Roney	441	1.08	–	$0
Ontario Party	John Ferguson	310	0.76	–	$0
Communist	Drew Garvie	120	0.30	–	$0
None of the Above	Joe Ring	111	0.27	+0.06	$0
Canadians' Choice	Bahman Yazdanfar	78	0.19	+0.04	$0
Total valid votes/expense limit		40,648	99.65	–	$116,071
Total rejected, unmarked and declined ballots		143	0.35	–0.58	
Turnout		40,791	49.58	–11.58	
Eligible voters		82,279			
Liberal gain from New Democratic		Swing		+11.71	
Source: Elections Ontario

2018 Ontario general election
Party	Candidate	Votes	%	±%
New Democratic	Rima Berns-McGown	24,064	48.21	+9.24
Liberal	Arthur Potts	13,480	27.01	–13.08
Progressive Conservative	Sarah Mallo	9,202	18.44	+4.51
Green	Debra Scott	2,128	4.26	–1.16
Libertarian	Thomas Armstrong	458	0.92	–0.30
Independent	Andrew Balodis	161	0.32	–
Special Needs	Regina Mundrugo	117	0.23	–
None of the Above	Joe Ring	104	0.21	–
Canadians' Choice	Bahman Yazdanfar	74	0.15	–
Cultural Action	Eric Brazau	68	0.14	–
People's Political Party	Tony Chipman	58	0.12	–
Total valid votes		49,914	99.07	
Total rejected, unmarked and declined ballots		470	0.93	–0.20
Turnout		50,384	61.16	+5.02
Eligible voters		82,386		
New Democratic gain from Liberal		Swing		+11.16
Source: Elections Ontario

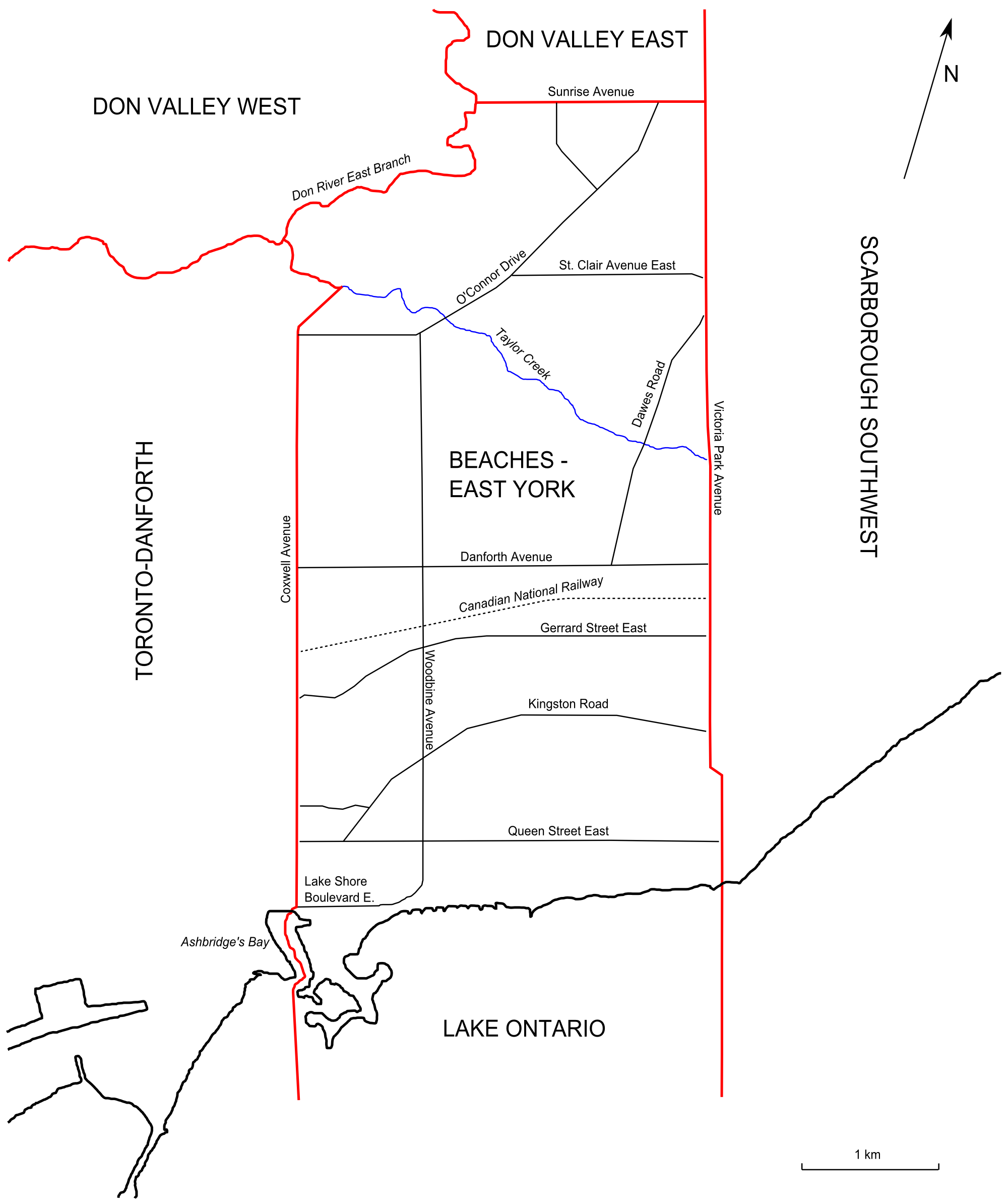
Map of Beaches-East York

2014 Ontario general election
Party	Candidate	Votes	%	±%
Liberal	Arthur Potts	17,218	40.09	+4.01
New Democratic	Michael Prue	16,737	38.97	–7.85
Progressive Conservative	Nicolas Johnson	5,982	13.93	–0.00
Green	Debra Scott	2,329	5.42	+2.75
Libertarian	Alex Lindsay	524	1.22	–
Freedom	Naomi Poley-Fisher	158	0.37	–0.01
Total valid votes		42,948	98.86	
Total rejected, unmarked and declined ballots		494	1.14	+0.72
Turnout		43,442	56.14	+4.50
Eligible voters		77,381		
Liberal gain from New Democratic		Swing		+5.93
Source: Elections Ontario

2011 Ontario general election
Party	Candidate	Votes	%	±%
New Democratic	Michael Prue	17,925	46.82	+2.50
Liberal	Helen Burstyn	13,813	36.08	+10.24
Progressive Conservative	Chris Menary	5,333	13.93	–1.66
Green	Shawn Ali	1,025	2.68	–9.42
Freedom	Naomi Poley-Fisher	144	0.38	+0.03
The Only Party	Joe Ross	45	0.12	–
Total valid votes		38,285	99.58	
Total rejected, unmarked and declined ballots		162	0.42	–0.48
Turnout		38,447	51.64	–2.73
Eligible voters		74,450		
New Democratic hold		Swing		–3.87
Source: Elections Ontario

2007 Ontario general election
Party	Candidate	Votes	%	±%
New Democratic	Michael Prue	17,522	44.32	–6.91
Liberal	Tom Teahen	10,215	25.84	+1.55
Progressive Conservative	Don Duvall	6,166	15.59	–4.08
Green	Caroline Law	4,785	12.10	+7.29
Libertarian	Doug Patfield	515	1.30	–
Family Coalition	Joel Kidd	201	0.51	–
Freedom	James Whitaker	135	0.34	–
Total valid votes		39,539	99.10	
Total rejected, unmarked and declined ballots		361	0.90	+0.26
Turnout		39,900	54.37	–1.26
Eligible voters		73,386		
New Democratic hold		Swing		–4.23
Source: Elections Ontario

2003 Ontario general election
Party	Candidate	Votes	%	±%
New Democratic	Michael Prue	21,239	51.23	+1.56
Liberal	Monica Purdy	10,070	24.29	–12.15
Progressive Conservative	Angela Kennedy	8,157	19.67	+9.68
Green	Tom Mason	1,995	4.81	+2.35
Total valid votes		41,461	99.36	
Total rejected, unmarked and declined ballots		267	0.64	+0.05
Turnout		41,728	55.63	+18.63
Eligible voters		75,006		
New Democratic hold		Swing		+6.86
Source: Elections Ontario

Ontario provincial by-election, September 20, 2001
Party	Candidate	Votes	%	±%
New Democratic	Michael Prue	14,024	49.66	+3.74
Liberal	Robert (Bob) Hunter	10,289	36.44	+14.68
Progressive Conservative	Mac Penney	2,821	9.99	–19.79
Green	Peter Elgie	694	2.46	+1.45
Family Coalition	Ray Scott	206	0.73	+0.11
Independent	Kevin Clarke	94	0.33	–
Independent	Vince Corriero	59	0.21	–
Independent	Dan King	51	0.18	–
Total valid votes		28,238	99.41	
Total rejected, unmarked and declined ballots		167	0.59	–0.19
Turnout		28,405	37.00	–16.64
Eligible voters		76,765		
New Democratic hold		Swing		–5.47
Source: Elections Ontario

1999 Ontario general election
Party	Candidate	Votes	%
New Democratic	Frances Lankin	19,703	45.93
Progressive Conservative	Judy Burns	12,776	29.78
Liberal	Bill Buckingham	9,332	21.75
Green	Michael Schulman	431	1.00
Family Coalition	Dan Largy	264	0.62
Natural Law	Donalda Fredeen	230	0.54
Independent	Steve Rutchinski	164	0.38
Total valid votes		42,900	99.23
Total rejected, unmarked and declined ballots		335	0.77
Turnout		43,235	53.64
Eligible voters		80,602	
New Democratic pickup new district.			
Source: Elections Ontario

== 2007 electoral reform referendum ==
2007 Ontario electoral reform referendum
Side	Votes	%
First Past the Post	19,100	49.9%
Mixed member proportional	19,180	50.1%
Total valid votes	38,280	100.0

- This riding was one of five ridings where a majority of voters supported MMP.

== See also ==
- List of Ontario provincial electoral districts
- Canadian provincial electoral districts
