= Toronto—St. Paul's (provincial electoral district) =

Provincial electoral district in Ontario, Canada

Coordinates: 43.6958°N 79.4075°W

Ontario electoral district
- Location in Toronto

Provincial electoral district
- Legislature: Legislative Assembly of Ontario
MPP
Stephanie Smyth
Liberal
- District created: 1996
- First contested: 1999
- Last contested: 2025

Demographics
- Population (2016): 107,900
- Electors (2018): 87,216
- Area (km²): 13
- Pop. density (per km²): 8,300
- Census division: Toronto
- Census subdivision: Toronto

Toronto—St. Paul's is a provincial electoral district in Ontario, Canada, that has been represented in the Legislative Assembly of Ontario since 1999. Before the 2018 election, it was known simply as St. Paul's.

The small but densely populated riding covers the area to the north of Downtown Toronto. The riding was represented by Liberal Eric Hoskins before his abrupt resignation on February 26, 2018.

The riding was created for the 1999 election, to match the borders of the federal riding of the same name. It was carved out of the former districts of St. Andrew—St. Patrick, Eglinton, Oakwood, Dovercourt, and St. George—St. David.

The riding consists of part of the Fairbank, Humewood-Cedarvale, Hillcrest-Bracondale, Wychwood Park, part of Davenport, Casa Loma, Forest Hill, Tarragon Village, Rathnelly, South Hill, Summerhill, Rosehill, Chaplin Estates, Deer Park and Davisville, and part of North Toronto neighbourhoods.

== Political geography ==
In the 2007 provincial election, the Liberals dominated most of the riding, performing the best in Fairbank in the northwest corner of the riding and in Davisville, in the east end of the riding. The Progressive Conservatives won most of their polls in the Forest Hill neighbourhood, and in Cedarvale. The NDP won a few polls, mostly in the south, where the riding borders the NDP riding of Trinity—Spadina.

== Members of Provincial Parliament ==
| Assembly | Years | Member | Party |
|---|---|---|---|
St. Paul's; Riding created from St. Andrew—St. Patrick, St. George—St. David, Eglinton, Oakwood and Dovercourt
| 37th | 1999–2003 | Michael Bryant | Liberal |
| 38th | 2003–2007 | Michael Bryant | Liberal |
| 39th | 2007–2009 | Michael Bryant | Liberal |
| 39th | 2009–2011 | Eric Hoskins | Liberal |
| 40th | 2011–2014 | Eric Hoskins | Liberal |
| 41st | 2014–2018 | Eric Hoskins | Liberal |
Toronto—St. Paul's
| 42nd | 2018–2022 | Jill Andrew | New Democratic |
| 43rd | 2022–2025 | Jill Andrew | New Democratic |
| 44th | 2025–present | Stephanie Smyth | Liberal |
Sourced from the Ontario Legislative Assembly

== Election results ==
=== 2025 election ===
Winning party in each polling division of Toronto—St. Paul's riding at the 2025 Ontario general election

2025 Ontario general election
| Party | Candidate | Votes | % | ±% | Expenditures |
|---|---|---|---|---|---|
| Liberal | Stephanie Smyth | 17,451 | 40.87 | +7.20 | $77,108 |
| New Democratic | Jill Andrew | 13,553 | 31.74 | –4.52 | $98,720 |
| Progressive Conservative | Riley Braunstein | 10,822 | 25.34 | +2.95 | $57,193 |
| Green | Chloe Tangpongprush | 873 | 2.04 | –3.42 | $11,655 |
| Total valid votes/expense limit | | 42,699 | 99.34 | +0.11 | $147,539 |
| Total rejected, unmarked, and declined ballots | | 284 | 0.66 | –0.11 | |
| Turnout | | 42,983 | 47.39 | –0.68 | |
| Eligible voters | | 90,708 | | | |
| Liberal gain from New Democratic | | Swing | | +5.86 | |
Source: Elections Ontario

=== 2022 election ===
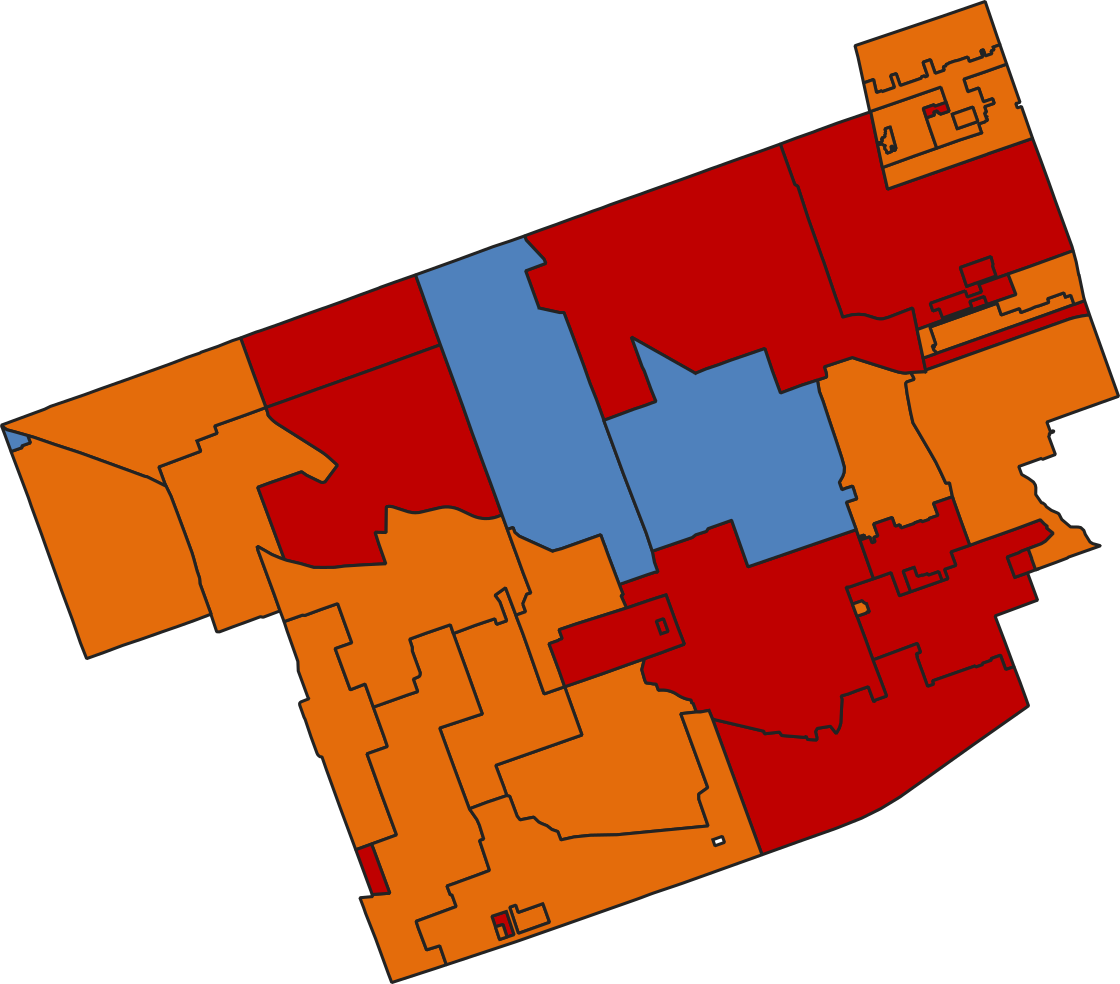
Winner in each polling division in Toronto—St. Paul's at the 2022 Ontario General Election

2022 Ontario general election
| Party | Candidate | Votes | % | ±% | Expenditures |
|---|---|---|---|---|---|
| New Democratic | Jill Andrew | 15,292 | 36.26 | +0.30 | $121,230 |
| Liberal | Nathan Stall | 14,200 | 33.67 | +0.27 | $89,943 |
| Progressive Conservative | Blake Libfeld | 9,445 | 22.39 | −3.90 | $89,223 |
| Green | Ian Lipton | 2,302 | 5.46 | +2.23 | $11,507 |
| New Blue | Yehuda Goldberg | 473 | 1.12 | | $503 |
| Ontario Party | Christian Ivanov Mihaylov | 242 | 0.57 | | $0 |
| Populist | Zoë Alexandra | 138 | 0.33 | | $0 |
| Moderate | Margarita Sharapova | 87 | 0.21 | −0.07 | $1,543 |
| Total valid votes/expense limit | | 42,179 | 100.0 | | $123,794 |
| Total rejected, unmarked, and declined ballots | | 328 | | | |
| Turnout | | 42,507 | 48.07 | | |
| Eligible voters | | 88,350 | | | |
| New Democratic hold | | Swing | | +0.01 | |
Source(s): "Summary of Valid Votes Cast for Each Candidate" (PDF). Elections Ontario. 2022. Archived from the original on May 18, 2023.; "Statistical Summary by Electoral District" (PDF). Elections Ontario. 2022. Archived from the original on May 21, 2023.

=== 2018 election ===
2018 Ontario general election
| Party | Candidate | Votes | % | ±% |
|---|---|---|---|---|
| New Democratic | Jill Andrew | 18,843 | 35.96 | +25.75 |
| Liberal | Jess Spindler | 17,498 | 33.39 | -26.26 |
| Progressive Conservative | Andrew Kirsch | 13,780 | 26.30 | +2.41 |
| Green | Teresa Pun | 1,690 | 3.23 | -1.85 |
| Libertarian | Jekiah U. Dunavant | 448 | 0.85 | -0.03 |
| Moderate | Marina Doshchitsina | 143 | 0.27 | +0.27 |
| Total valid votes | | 52,402 | 98.97 | |
| Total rejected, unmarked and declined ballots | | 547 | 1.03 | |
| Turnout | | 52,949 | 63.63 | |
| Eligible voters | | 83,206 | | |
| New Democratic notional gain from Liberal | | Swing | | +26.00 |
Source: Elections Ontario

2014 general election redistributed results
| Party | Vote | % |
|---|---|---|
| Liberal | 26,117 | 59.24 |
| Progressive Conservative | 10,571 | 23.98 |
| New Democratic | 4,608 | 10.45 |
| Green | 2,271 | 5.15 |
| Others | 521 | 1.18 |

2014 Ontario general election: St. Paul's
| Party | Candidate | Votes | % | ±% |
|---|---|---|---|---|
| Liberal | Eric Hoskins | 30,027 | 59.74 | +1.35 |
| Progressive Conservative | Justine Deluce | 12,037 | 23.95 | +3.03 |
| New Democratic | Luke Savage | 5,056 | 10.06 | –6.55 |
| Green | Josh Rachlis | 2,569 | 5.11 | +2.36 |
| Libertarian | John Kittredge | 407 | 0.81 | +0.03 |
| Freedom | Mike Rita | 165 | 0.33 | +0.13 |
| Total valid votes | | 50,261 | 98.99 | |
| Total rejected, unmarked and declined ballots | | 511 | 1.01 | +0.60 |
| Turnout | | 50,772 | 57.11 | +6.70 |
| Eligible voters | | 88,905 | | |
| Liberal hold | | Swing | | –0.84 |
Source: Elections Ontario

2011 Ontario general election: St. Paul's
| Party | Candidate | Votes | % | ±% |
|---|---|---|---|---|
| Liberal | Eric Hoskins | 25,048 | 58.39 | +10.83 |
| Progressive Conservative | Christine McGirr | 8,972 | 20.92 | –7.42 |
| New Democratic | David Hynes | 7,124 | 16.61 | –0.32 |
| Green | Judith Van Veldhuysen | 1,180 | 2.75 | –2.72 |
| Libertarian | John Kittredge | 335 | 0.78 | +0.20 |
| Freedom | Mike Rita | 86 | 0.20 | –0.02 |
| Socialist | Keith Pinto | 83 | 0.19 | – |
| Northern Ontario Heritage | David Vallance | 69 | 0.16 | – |
| Total valid votes | | 42,897 | 99.59 | |
| Total rejected, unmarked and declined ballots | | 177 | 0.41 | –0.02 |
| Turnout | | 43,074 | 50.41 | +16.95 |
| Eligible voters | | 85,451 | | |
| Liberal hold | | Swing | | +9.12 |
Source: Elections Ontario

Ontario provincial by-election, September 17, 2009: St. Paul's Resignation of Michael Bryant
| Party | Candidate | Votes | % | ±% |
|---|---|---|---|---|
| Liberal | Eric Hoskins | 13,181 | 47.57 | +0.14 |
| Progressive Conservative | Sue-Ann Levy | 7,851 | 28.33 | +1.79 |
| New Democratic | Julian Heller | 4,691 | 16.93 | +1.19 |
| Green | Chris Chopik | 1,516 | 5.47 | –2.87 |
| Libertarian | John Kittredge | 160 | 0.58 | +0.04 |
| Special Needs | Danish Ahmed | 96 | 0.35 | – |
| Independent | Marius Frederick | 84 | 0.30 | – |
| Freedom | Paul McKeever | 61 | 0.22 | –0.04 |
| Independent | John Turmel | 47 | 0.17 | – |
| Independent | Raj Rama | 24 | 0.09 | – |
| Total valid votes | | 27,711 | 99.57 | |
| Total rejected, unmarked and declined ballots | | 119 | 0.43 | –0.30 |
| Turnout | | 27,830 | 33.46 | –22.54 |
| Eligible voters | | 83,183 | | |
| Liberal hold | | Swing | | –0.82 |
Source: Elections Ontario

2007 Ontario general election: St. Paul's
| Party | Candidate | Votes | % | ±% |
|---|---|---|---|---|
| Liberal | Michael Bryant | 21,280 | 47.43 | –7.33 |
| Progressive Conservative | Lillyann Goldstein | 11,910 | 26.54 | +1.90 |
| New Democratic | Julian Heller | 7,061 | 15.74 | +0.91 |
| Green | Steven D'Sa | 3,744 | 8.34 | +3.36 |
| Independent | Charles De Kerckhove | 328 | 0.73 | – |
| Libertarian | John Kittredge | 240 | 0.53 | – |
| Family Coalition | Blaise Thompson | 190 | 0.42 | – |
| Freedom | Carol Leborg | 115 | 0.26 | –0.52 |
| Total valid votes | | 44,868 | 99.27 | |
| Total rejected, unmarked and declined ballots | | 329 | 0.73 | +0.05 |
| Turnout | | 45,197 | 55.99 | –2.04 |
| Eligible voters | | 80,718 | | |
| Liberal hold | | Swing | | –4.61 |
Source: Elections Ontario

2003 Ontario general election: St. Paul's
| Party | Candidate | Votes | % | ±% |
|---|---|---|---|---|
| Liberal | Michael Bryant | 24,887 | 54.76 | +4.18 |
| Progressive Conservative | Charis Kelso | 11,203 | 24.65 | –15.74 |
| New Democratic | Julian Heller | 6,740 | 14.83 | +7.70 |
| Green | Peter Elgie | 2,266 | 4.99 | +4.29 |
| Freedom | Carol Leborg | 354 | 0.78 | – |
| Total valid votes | | 45,450 | 99.32 | |
| Total rejected, unmarked and declined ballots | | 311 | 0.68 | –0.25 |
| Turnout | | 45,761 | 58.04 | –1.85 |
| Eligible voters | | 78,847 | | |
| Liberal hold | | Swing | | +9.96 |
Source: Elections Ontario

1999 Ontario general election: St. Paul's
| Party | Candidate | Votes | % |
|---|---|---|---|
| Liberal | Michael Bryant | 23,755 | 50.57 |
| Progressive Conservative | Isabel Bassett | 18,973 | 40.39 |
| New Democratic | Larry Solway | 3,350 | 7.13 |
| Green | Don Roebuck | 326 | 0.69 |
| Independent | Philip Fernandez | 194 | 0.41 |
| Natural Law | Linda Martin | 188 | 0.40 |
| Independent | Antonio Maristanes | 184 | 0.39 |
| Total valid votes | | 46,970 | 99.07 |
| Total rejected, unmarked and declined ballots | | 442 | 0.93 |
| Turnout | | 47,412 | 59.89 |
| Eligible voters | | 79,168 | |
| Liberal pickup new district. | | | |
Source: Elections Ontario

== 2007 electoral reform referendum ==
2007 Ontario electoral reform referendum
| Side | Votes | % |
|---|---|---|
| First Past the Post | 24,009 | 55.0 |
| Mixed member proportional | 19,630 | 45.0 |
| Total valid votes | 43,639 | 100.0 |

== See also ==
- List of Ontario provincial electoral districts
- Canadian provincial electoral districts
