= Canadians' Choice Party =

Provincial political party in Canada

- Active provincial party
- Abbreviation: CCP
- Leader: Bahman Yazdanfar
- President: Bahman Yazdanfar
- Founded: August 26, 2011
- Headquarters: 1-927 Danforth Ave, Toronto ON M4J 1L8
- Political position: Far-right
- Seats in Legislature: 0 / 107

Website
- canadianschoice.com

The Canadians′ Choice Party (CCP) is a minor far-right political party based in Ontario, Canada. The party is led by Bahman Yazdanfar.

== History ==
The Canadians' Choice Party was founded on August 26, 2011 by Bahman Yazdanfar of Toronto. Yazdanfar, who immigrated to Canada from Iran in 1986, ran a small consulting firm for businesses until 2008, when the global economic recession caused him to close. After the failure of his business, Yazdanfar began a talk show on YouTube which interviewed subjects ranging from mainstream local figures to political extremists.

In 2015, in response to public outcry over Your Ward News, a local newspaper delivered to households in The Beaches that was banned by Canada Post for carrying antisemitic and racist content, Yazdanfar supported the publication, buying advertising in it and decrying the Ontario government's laying of criminal charges against the publication's publisher and editor for hate speech.

The party failed to win any seats in the 2022 Ontario general election.

== Platform ==
The party bills itself as a "party of independents" and offers very few barriers for entry. To run as a candidate for the party, a candidate has to:

- Show responsibility first to the riding they represent when they become MPP.
- Show commitment to stay in the Canadians' Choice Party for the entire mandate once elected.
- Not cross the floor.

On its website, the party supports four priorities:

- Fiscal responsibility and respect for taxpayers,
- Individual freedom and the right to free speech,
- Sovereignty and protection of common-law rights,
- Transparency and accountability in government.

It also calls for the ability to recall elected officials and calls for more referendums.

== Controversy and associations with Neo-Nazism ==
The party's position on unfettered free speech has caused controversy in the 2018 provincial election when several of its candidates were found to be associated with the neo-Nazi movement in Canada. James Sears, who ran in the riding of Ottawa Centre, is the editor of the far-right newspaper, Your Ward News, and claims to be an adherent of Nazism.

Among the party's other notable candidates were Paul Fromm, a prominent Canadian white supremacist, who ran in Etobicoke Centre in 2018, and Leslie Bory, a Brantford-based Holocaust denier and conspiracy theorist convicted of spreading online hate, who ran in Brantford—Brant in both 2018 and 2022.

== Electoral results ==
Election results
Election year	Party Leader	No. of overall votes	% of overall total	No. of candidates run	No. of seats won	+/−	Government
2011	Bahman Yazdanfar	156	< .01%	3 / 107	0 / 107	New Party	Extra-parliamentary
2014	Bahman Yazdanfar	1,293	0.03%	4 / 107	0 / 107	▲0.03%	Extra-parliamentary
2018	Bahman Yazdanfar	1,239	0.02%	5 / 124	0 / 124	▼0.01%	Extra-parliamentary
2022	Bahman Yazdanfar	568	0.01%	2 / 124	0 / 124	▼0.01%	Extra-parliamentary
2025	Bahman Yazdanfar	582	0.01%	2 / 124	0 / 124	Steady	Extra-parliamentary

In the 2011 Ontario general election, the Canadians' Choice Party nominated three candidates for the Legislative Assembly of Ontario:

Riding	Candidate's Name	Notes	Votes	%	Rank
Toronto Centre	Bahman Yazdanfar	Party Leader	19	0.04%	10/10
St. Catharines	Jon Radick		62	0.14%	7/8
Toronto—Danforth	John Richardson		75	0.2%	9/9

In the 2014 election, Yazdanfar and Richardson ran again, this time joined by Dorian Baxter, perennial candidate for the Progressive Canadian Party.

Riding	Candidate's Name	Notes	Votes	%	Rank
Toronto Centre	Bahman Yazdanfar	Party Leader	78	0.15%	11/11
Scarborough—Guildwood	John Sawdon		120	0.34%	7/7
Newmarket—Aurora	Dorian Baxter		922	1.76%	5/7
Toronto—Danforth	John Richardson		167	0.4%	7/10

In the 2018 election, the party ran five candidates:

Riding	Candidate's Name	Notes	Votes	%	Rank
Beaches—East York	Bahman Yazdanfar	Party Leader	74	0.14%	9/11
Barrie—Innisfil	Jake Tucker		184	0.42%	6/8
Brantford—Brant	Leslie Bory		253	0.44%	8/9
Etobicoke Centre	Paul Fromm		631	1.10%	5/7
Ottawa Centre	James Sears		92	0.14%	8/8
